= I Constitutional Government of Timor-Leste =

East Timorese cabinet led by Mari Alkatiri

I Constitutional Government
- I Constitutional Government of East Timor

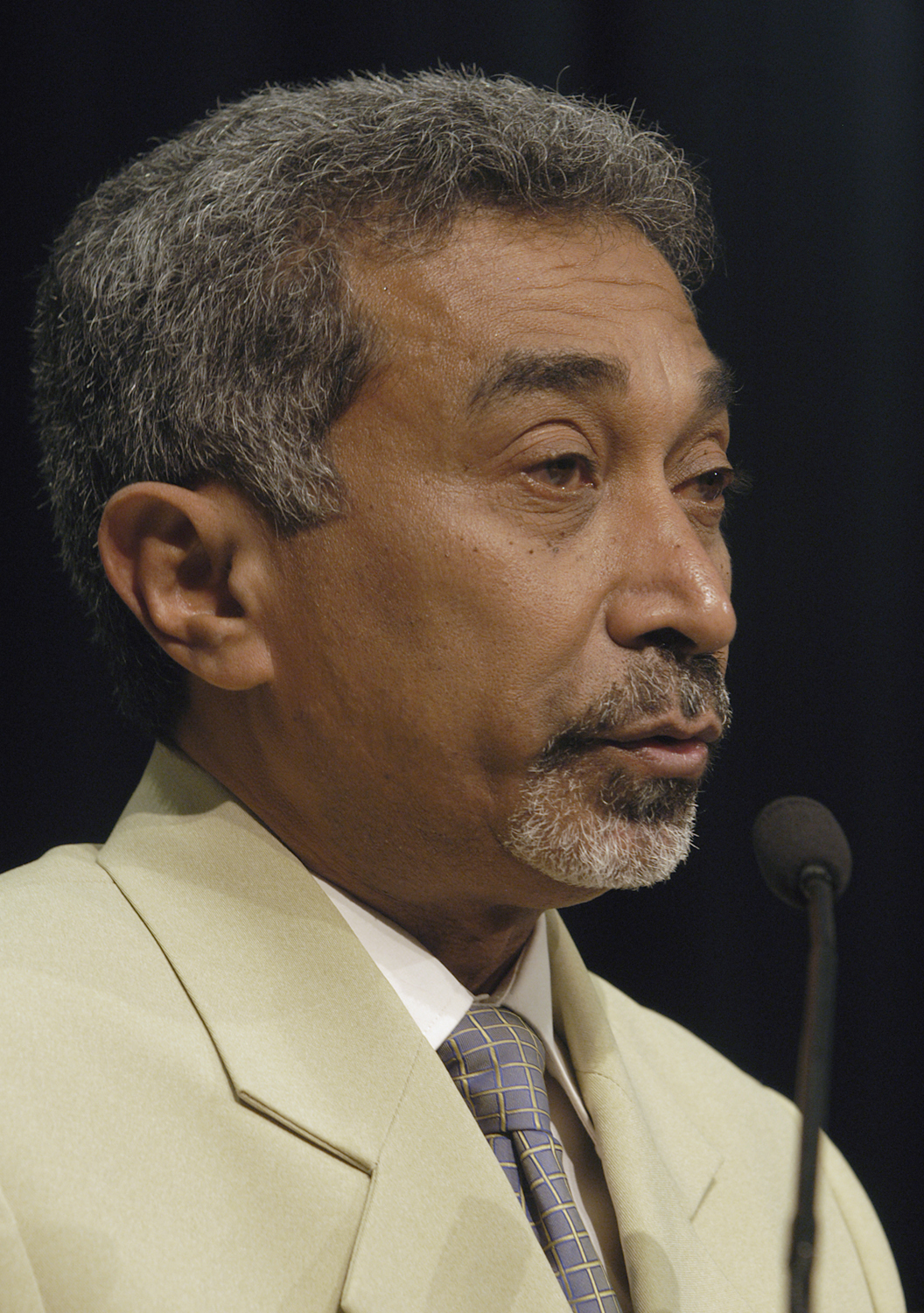
- Prime Minister Mari Alkatiri
- Date formed: 20 May 2002
- Date dissolved: 10 July 2006

People and organisations
- President: Xanana Gusmão
- Prime Minister: Mari Alkatiri
- No. of ministers: 1 Prime Minister; 8–9 other Ministers; 8–9 Vice Ministers; 8–9 Secretaries of State; (20 May 2003 – 26 July 2005); 1 Prime Minister; 14 other Ministers; 11 Vice Ministers; 9 Secretaries of State; (26 July 2005 – 10 July 2006)
- Member parties: Fretilin
- Status in legislature: Majority

History
- Election: 2001
- Predecessor: II UNTAET Transitional Government
- Successor: II Constitutional Government

The I Constitutional Government (Portuguese: I Governo Constitucional, Tetum: I Governu Konstitusionál) was the first Constitutional Government (administration or cabinet) under the Constitution of Timor-Leste (formerly known as East Timor). Formed on 20 May 2002, it was led by the country's second Prime Minister, Mari Alkatiri, and was replaced by the II Constitutional Government on 10 July 2006.

== Initial composition ==
From 20 May 2002 until it was restructured on 26 July 2005, the government was made up of Ministers, Vice Ministers and Secretaries of State, as follows:

=== Ministers ===
Party	Minister	Portrait	Portfolio
Fretilin	Mari Alkatiri		Prime Minister and Minister of Development and Environment
Independent	José Ramos-Horta		Minister of State and Minister of Foreign Affairs and Cooperation
Fretilin	Ana Maria Pessoa		Minister of Justice (20 May 2002 – 4 March 2003); Minister of State in the Presidency of the Council of Ministers (6 March 2003 – 26 July 2005)
Fretilin	Maria Madalena Brites Boavida		Minister of Planning and Finance
Fretilin	Ovídio Amaral		Minister of Transport, Communications and Public Works
Fretilin	Rogério Tiago Lobato		Minister of Internal Administration (20 May 2002 – 4 March 2003); Minister of Interior (6 March 2003 – 26 July 2005)
Fretilin	Estanislau Aleixo da Silva		Minister of Agriculture, Forestry and Fisheries
Independent	Armindo Maia		Minister of Education, Culture, Youth and Sports
Independent	Rui Araújo		Minister of Health
Fretilin	Domingos Sarmento		Minister of Justice (6 March 2003 – 26 July 2005)

=== Vice Ministers ===
Party	Vice Minister	Portrait	Portfolio
Fretilin	José Luís Guterres		Vice Minister of Foreign Affairs and Cooperation (20 May 2002 – c. May 2003)
Fretilin	Jorge Teme		Vice Minister of Foreign Affairs and Cooperation (20 May 2002 – March 2003)
Fretilin	César Vital Moreira		Vice Minister of Transport, Communications and Public Works
Independent	Manuel Abrantes		Vice Minister of Justice
Fretilin	Domingos Sarmento		Vice Minister of Justice (20 May 2002 – 4 March 2003)
Fretilin	Aicha Bassarewan		Vice Minister of Planning and Finance
Independent	Alcino Baris		Vice Minister of Internal Administration (20 May 2002 – 4 March 2003); Vice Minister of Interior (6 March 2003 – 26 July 2005)
Fretilin	Ilda Conceição		Vice Minister of International Administration (20 May 2002 – 4 March 2003); Minister of State Administration (6 March 2003 – 26 July 2005)
Fretilin	Luís Lobato		Vice Minister of Health
Fretilin	Abel Ximenes		Vice Minister of Development and Environment (6 March 2003 – 26 July 2005)
Fretilin	Olímpio Branco		Vice Minister of Foreign Affairs and Cooperation (c. May 2003 – 26 July 2005)

=== Secretaries of State ===
Party	Secretary of State	Portrait	Portfolio
Independent	Roque Félix Rodrigues		Secretary of State for Defence
Fretilin	Arsénio Bano		Secretary of State for Labour and Solidarity
Fretilin	Arlindo Rangel		Secretary of State for Trade and Industry
Fretilin	Gregório Sousa		Secretary of State for the Council of Ministers
Fretilin	Antoninho Bianco		Secretary of State for Parliamentary Issues for the PM
Fretilin	Egídio de Jesus		Secretary of State for Electricity and Water at the Ministry of Transport, Communications and Public Works
Fretilin	José Teixeira		Secretary of State for Tourism, Environment and Investment at the Ministry of Development and Environment
Independent	Virgílio Simith		Secretary of State for Education, Culture, Youth and Sports
Fretilin	João Baptista Alves		Secretary of State for Public Works (6 March 2003 – 26 July 2005)

== Restructured composition ==
Following the restructuring on 26 July 2005, the government was made up of Ministers, Vice Ministers and Secretaries of State, as follows:

=== Ministers ===
Party	Minister	Portrait	Portfolio
Fretilin	Mari Alkatiri		Prime Minister and Minister of Natural and Mineral Resources, and Energy Policy
Independent	José Ramos-Horta		Minister of State and Minister of Foreign Affairs and Cooperation
Fretilin	Maria Madalena Brites Boavida		Minister of Planning and Finance
Fretilin	Ana Maria Pessoa		Minister of State Administration
Fretilin	Ovídio Amaral		Minister of Transport and Communications
Fretilin	Rogério Tiago Lobato		Minister of Interior (26 July 2005 – 1 June 2006)
Independent	Roque Félix Rodrigues		Minister of Defence (26 July 2005 – 1 June 2006)
Fretilin	Antoninho Bianco		Minister in the Presidency of the Council of Ministers
Fretilin	Estanislau Aleixo da Silva		Minister of Agriculture, Forestry and Fisheries
Independent	Armindo Maia		Minister of Education and Culture
Independent	Rui Araújo		Minister of Health
Fretilin	Domingos Sarmento		Minister of Justice
Fretilin	Abel Ximenes		Minister of Development
Independent	Odete Vítor		Minister of Public Works
Fretilin	Arsénio Bano		Minister of Labour and Community Reinsertion

=== Vice Ministers ===
Party	Vice Minister	Portrait	Portfolio
Fretilin	Adaljíza Magno		Vice Minister of Foreign Affairs and Cooperation
Fretilin	Aicha Bassarewan		Vice Minister of Planning and Finance
Fretilin	Valentim Ximenes		Vice Minister of State Administration
Fretilin	José Teixeira		Vice Minister of Natural and Mineral Resources, and Energy Policy
Independent	Alcino Baris		Vice Minister of Interior
Fretilin	Francisco Sá Benevides		Vice Minister of Coffee and Forestry
Fretilin	Rosária Corte-Real		Vice Minister for Primary and Secondary Education
Fretilin	Luís Lobato		Vice Minister of Health
Independent	Manuel Abrantes		Vice Minister of Justice
Independent	Arcanjo da Silva		Vice Minister of Development
Fretilin	Raúl da Cunha Mousaco		Vice Minister of Public Works

=== Secretaries of State ===
Party	Secretary of State	Portrait	Portfolio
Fretilin	Gregório Sousa		Secretary of State for the Council of Ministers
Fretilin	José Manuel Fernandes		Secretary of State for Youth and Sports
Fretilin	João Alves		Secretary of State for Environmental Coordination, Territorial Ordering and Physical Development
Fretilin	José Maria dos Reis		Secretary of State for the Coordination of Region I (Lautem, Viqueque and Baucau)
Independent	Virgílio Simith		Secretary of State for the Coordination of Region II (Manatuto, Manufahi and Ainaro)
Fretilin	Egídio de Jesus		Secretary of State for the Coordination of Region III (Dili, Aileu and Ermera)
Independent	César da Cruz		Secretary of State for the Coordination of Region IV (Liquiça, Bobonaro and Cova-Lima)
Independent	Albano Salem		Secretary of State resident in Oecussi
Fretilin	David Ximenes		Secretary of State for Veterans and Former Combatants
