= Minister of Defense (Timor-Leste) =

East Timorese government minister

- Ministro da Defesa (Portuguese); Ministru Defeza (Tetum)
- Coat of Arms of Timor-Leste

- Flag of Timor-Leste

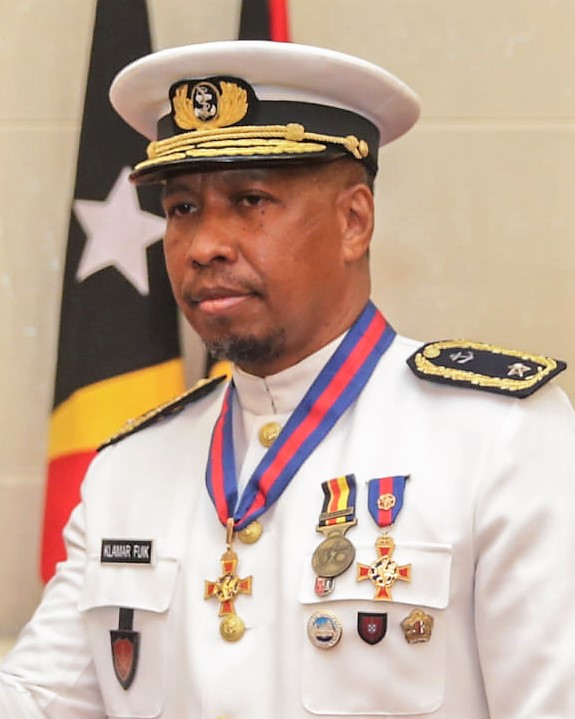
- Incumbent; Pedro Klamar Fuik since 1 July 2023
- Ministry of Defense
- Style: Minister; (informal); His Excellency; (formal, diplomatic)
- Member of: the government
- Reports to: Prime minister
- Appointer: President (following proposal by the Prime minister)
- Formation: 1975 / 2005
- First holder: Rogerio Lobato; (1975); Roque Félix Rodrigues; (2005)
- Website: Official website

The Minister of Defense (Portuguese: Ministro da Defesa, Tetum: Ministru Defeza) is a senior member of the Constitutional Government of Timor-Leste heading the Ministry of Defense.

== Functions ==
Under the Constitution of Timor-Leste, the Minister has the power and the duty:

1. to implement the policy defined for the Ministry of Defense;
2. to ensure relations between the Government and the other organs of the State in the area of responsibility of the Ministry.

Where the Minister is in charge of the subject matter of a government statute, the Minister is also required, together with the Prime Minister, to sign the statute.

== Incumbent ==
The incumbent Minister of Defense is Pedro Klamar Fuik.

== List of ministers ==
The following individuals have been appointed as the minister:

No.	Portrait	Name (born–died)	Term of office			Political party	Government (Prime minister(s))	Ref.
No.	Portrait	Name (born–died)	Took office	Left office	Time in office	Political party	Government (Prime minister(s))	Ref.
Minister of National Defence
1		Rogério Lobato (born 1949)	1 December 1975	17 December 1975	16 days	Fretilin	1975 CoM (Lobato)	
1975–1999: Indonesian occupation of East Timor
Minister of Defence
2		Roque Félix Rodrigues (born 1949)	26 July 2005	1 June 2006	310 days	Independent	I Constitutional (Alkatiri)	
–		José Ramos-Horta (born 1949)	1 June 2006	10 June 2006	9 days	Independent	I Constitutional (Alkatiri)	
3		José Ramos-Horta (born 1949)	10 July 2006	19 May 2007	313 days	Independent	II Constitutional (Ramos-Horta)	
4		Estanislau da Silva (born 1952)	19 May 2007	8 August 2007	81 days	Fretilin	III Constitutional (da Silva)	
5		Xanana Gusmão (born 1946)	8 August 2007	8 August 2012	5 years, 0 days	CNRT	IV Constitutional (Gusmão)	
Minister of Defence and Security
5		Xanana Gusmão (born 1946)	8 August 2012	16 February 2015	2 years, 192 days	CNRT	V Constitutional (Gusmão)	
Minister of Defence
6		Cirilo Cristóvão (1966–2019)	16 February 2015	3 October 2017	2 years, 229 days	CNRT	VI Constitutional (Araújo)	
Minister of Defence and Security
7		José Agostinho Sequeira (born 1959)	3 October 2017	22 June 2018	262 days	Fretilin	VII Constitutional (Alkatiri)	
Minister of Defence
8		Filomeno da Paixão de Jesus (born 1953)	22 June 2018	1 July 2023	5 years, 9 days	Independent	VIII Constitutional (Ruak)	
9		Pedro Klamar Fuik (born 1969)	1 July 2023	Incumbent	3 years, 68 days	Independent	IX Constitutional (Gusmão)	

== See also ==
- Timor Leste Defence Force
