= II UNTAET Transitional Government of East Timor =

UN / East Timorese cabinet led by Mari Alkatiri

II UNTAET Transitional Government
- II UNTAET Transitional Government of East Timor

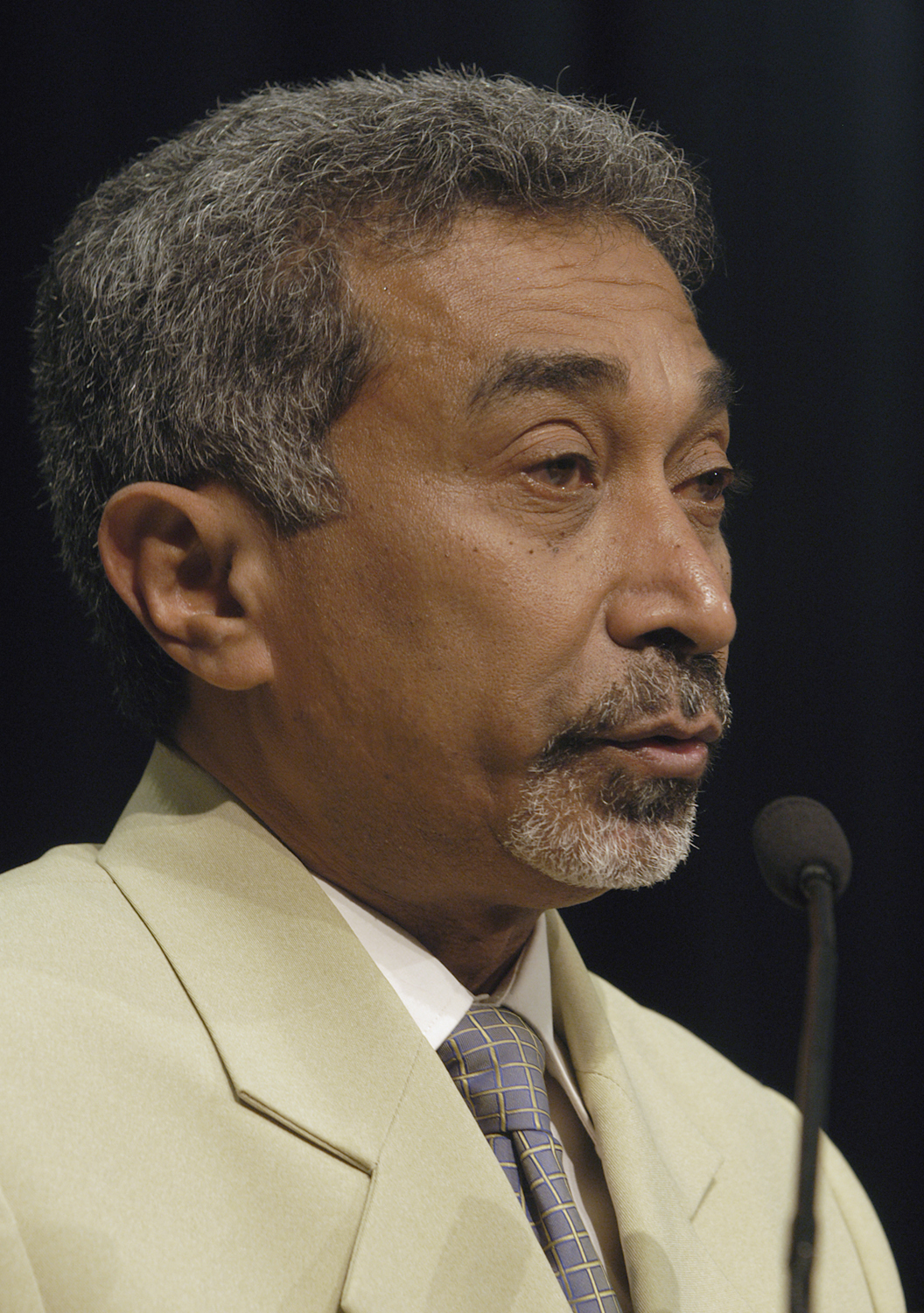
- Chief Minister Mari Alkatiri
- Date formed: 20 September 2001
- Date dissolved: 20 May 2002

People and organisations
- Transitional Administrator: Sérgio Vieira de Mello
- Chief Minister: Mari Alkatiri
- Member parties: Fretilin–PD
- Status in legislature: Majority 62 / 88 (70%)

History
- Predecessor: I UNTAET Transitional Government
- Successor: I Constitutional Government

The II UNTAET Transitional Government (Portuguese: II Governo Transitório UNTAET, Tetum: II Governu Tranzisaun UNTAET) was the second administration or cabinet of United Nations Administered East Timor, a United Nations protectorate that provided an interim civil administration and a peacekeeping mission in the territory of East Timor from 25 October 1999 until 20 May 2002.

On 19 September 2001, the UN Transitional Administrator, Sérgio Vieira de Mello, made a regulation on the establishment of the II UNTAET Transitional Government, which the regulation referred to officially as the "Council of Ministers".

The following day, 20 September 2001, the Transitional Administrator swore in the members of the II UNTAET Transitional Government, which was led by Chief Minister Mari Alkatiri, and was replaced on 20 May 2002 by the I Constitutional Government of the independent East Timor.

== Composition ==
The government was made up of the following Ministers, Vice Ministers and Secretaries of State, and others, as follows:

=== Ministers ===
Party	Minister	Portrait	Portfolio
Fretilin	Mari Alkatiri		Chief Minister and Minister of Economy and Development
Independent	José Ramos-Horta		Minister of Foreign Affairs and Cooperation
Fretilin	Ana Maria Pessoa		Minister of Justice
Independent	Fernanda Mesquita Borges		Minister of Finance (to 23 April 2002)
Fretilin	Antoninho Bianco		Minister of Internal Administration
Independent	Rui Maria de Araújo		Minister of Health
Fretilin	César Vital Moreira		Minister of Water and Public Works
Fretilin	Ovídio de Jesus Amaral		Minister of Transport and Communications
Independent	Armindo Maia		Minister of Education, Culture and Youth
Fretilin	Estanislau Aleixo da Silva		Minister of Agriculture and Fisheries
Fretilin	Maria Madalena Brites Boavida		Minister of Finance (from 30 April 2002)

=== Vice Ministers ===
Party	Vice Minister	Portrait	Portfolio
PD	Fernando de Araújo		Vice-Minister of Foreign Affairs and Cooperation
Fretilin	Jorge Teme		Vice-Minister of Foreign Affairs and Cooperation
Fretilin	Domingos Maria Sarmento		Vice-Minister of Justice
Fretilin	Arlindo Rangel da Cruz		Vice-Minister of Finance
Fretilin	Ilda Maria da Conceição		Vice-Minister of Internal Administration
PD	João Soares Martins		Vice-Minister of Health
Fretilin	Roque Félix Rodrigues		Vice-Minister of Education, Culture and Youth

=== Secretaries of State ===
Party	Secretary of State	Portrait	Portfolio
Fretilin	Arsenio Paixão Bano		Secretary of State for Labour and Solidarity
Fretilin	Gregório de Sousa		Secretary of State for the Council of Ministers
Fretilin	Egídio de Jesus		Secretary of State for Natural and Mineral Resources
Fretilin	Roque Félix Rodrigues		Secretary of State for Defence (from 30 April 2022)

=== Others ===
Party	Office holder	Portrait	Portfolio
Independent	Mariano José Lopes da Cruz		Inspector-General of the Transitional Government
Independent	Emília Pires		Secretary of the Commission on Planning of the Transitional Government
UDT	Isabel da Costa Ferreira		Advisor on Human Rights
Independent	Maria Domingas Fernandes Alves		Advisor on the Promotion of Equality
UDT	António da Conceição		Advisor on the Development of the Commission on Planning
