= Minister of Foreign Affairs and Cooperation (Timor-Leste) =

East Timorese government minister

- Ministro dos Negócios Estrangeiros e Cooperação (Portuguese); Ministru Negósius Estranjeirus no Kooperasaun (Tetun)
- Coat of Arms of Timor-Leste

- Flag of Timor-Leste

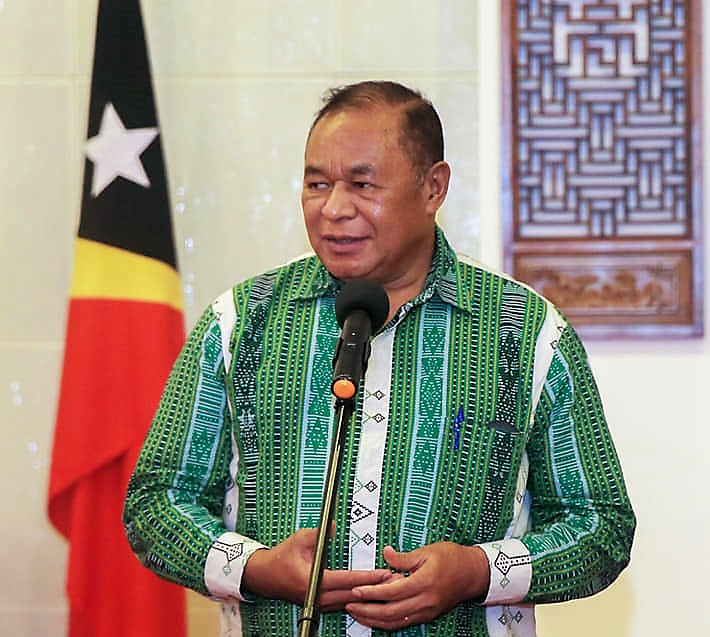
- Incumbent; Bendito Freitas since 1 July 2023
- Ministry of Foreign Affairs and Cooperation
- Style: Minister; (informal); His Excellency; (formal, diplomatic)
- Member of: Constitutional Government
- Reports to: Prime Minister
- Appointer: President of Timor-Leste; (following proposal by the Prime Minister of Timor-Leste)
- Inaugural holder: José Ramos-Horta
- Formation: 1975 / 2000

The Minister of Foreign Affairs and Cooperation (Portuguese: Ministro dos Negócios Estrangeiros e Cooperação, Tetun: Ministru Negósius Estranjeirus no Kooperasaun) is a senior member of the Constitutional Government of Timor-Leste heading the Ministry of Foreign Affairs and Cooperation.

== Functions ==
Under the Constitution of Timor-Leste, the Minister has the power and the duty:

1. to implement the policy defined for the Ministry of Foreign Affairs and Cooperation;
2. to ensure relations between the Government and the other organs of the State in the area of responsibility of the Ministry.

Where the Minister is in charge of the subject matter of a government statute, the Minister is also required, together with the Prime Minister, to sign the statute.

== History ==
In the 1975 Council of Ministers, and also in the I UNTAET Transitional Government (2000–2001), the title of the Minister was "Minister of Foreign Affairs". When the II UNTAET Transitional Government took office on 20 September 2001, the title was changed to Minister of Foreign Affairs and Cooperation.

== Incumbent ==
The incumbent minister is Bendito Freitas.

== List of ministers ==
The following individuals have been appointed as the minister:

No.	Party	Minister	Portrait	Government (Prime Minister)	Term start	Term end	Term in office
1	Fretilin	José Ramos-Horta		1975 CoM (Lobato)	1 December 1975	17 December 1975	16 days
(1)	Independent	José Ramos-Horta		I UNTAET (Vieira de Mello)	15 July 2000	31 March 2001	259 days
(1)	Independent	José Ramos-Horta		I UNTAET (Vieira de Mello)	15 July 2001	20 September 2001	4 years, 360 days
(1)	Independent	José Ramos-Horta		II UNTAET (Alkatiri)	20 September 2001	20 May 2002	4 years, 360 days
(1)	Independent	José Ramos-Horta		I Constitutional (Alkatiri)	20 May 2002	10 July 2006	4 years, 360 days
2	Fretilin	José Luís Guterres		II Constitutional (Ramos-Horta)	10 July 2006	19 May 2007	313 days
(acting)	Fretilin	Adaljíza Magno		III Constitutional (da Silva)	19 May 2007	8 August 2007	81 days
3	PSD	Zacarias da Costa		IV Constitutional (Gusmão)	8 August 2007	8 August 2012	5 years, 0 days
(2)	FM	José Luís Guterres		V Constitutional (Gusmão)	8 August 2012	16 February 2015	2 years, 192 days
4	Fretilin	Hernâni Coelho		VI Constitutional (Araújo)	16 February 2015	15 September 2017	2 years, 211 days
5	Fretilin	Aurélio Sérgio Cristóvão Guterres		VII Constitutional (Alkatiri)	15 September 2017	22 June 2018	280 days
6	CNRT	Dionísio da Costa Babo Soares		VIII Constitutional (Ruak)	22 June 2018	25 May 2020	1 year, 338 days
7	Fretilin	Adaljíza Albertina Xavier Reis Magno		VIII Constitutional (Ruak) (restructured)	24 June 2020	1 July 2023	3 years, 7 days
8	CNRT	Bendito Freitas		IX Constitutional (Gusmão)	1 July 2023	Incumbent	3 years, 107 days
