= Armindo Maia =

East Timorese politician and academic

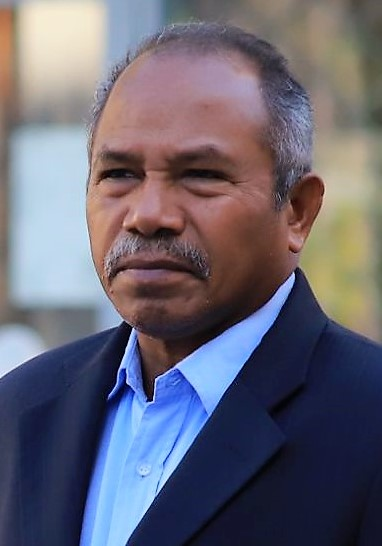
- Maia in 2020

Minister of Education, Youth and Sport
- In office 24 June 2020 – 1 July 2023
- Prime Minister: Taur Matan Ruak
- Preceded by: Dulce de Jesus Soares
- Succeeded by: Dulce de Jesus Soares

Minister of Education, Culture and Youth / Education, Culture, Youth and Sports / Education and Culture
- In office 30 September 2001 – 14 July 2006
- Prime Minister: Mari Alkatiri; (from 20 May 2002)
- Governor: Sérgio Vieira de Mello; (UN administrator)
- Preceded by: Dulce de Jesus Soares
- Succeeded by: Rosária Corte-Real

Personal details
- Party: Fretilin
- Education: Massey University; Australian National University

Armindo Maia is an East Timorese politician and academic, and a member of the Fretilin political party. From June 2020 to July 2023, he was the Minister of Education, Youth and Sport, serving in the VIII Constitutional Government of East Timor led by Prime Minister Taur Matan Ruak.

Previously, between 2001 and 2006, he held the equivalent position in governments led by UN administrator Sérgio Vieira de Mello and Prime Minister Mari Alkatiri, respectively.

== Early life and career ==
Maia has a master's degree in Philosophy from Massey University in Palmerston North, New Zealand. He was a pioneering staff member of the Universitas Timor Timur (UnTim), East Timor's first university, from when it was founded in 1986. By 1997, he was UnTim's Vice Rector for Academic Affairs.

During the Indonesian occupation of East Timor that lasted until 1999, Maia was involved in a number of academic and political activities internationally in support of East Timor's independence movement. On a visit to the US in the late-1990s, he interacted with prominent East Timorese from the diaspora, including José Ramos-Horta and João Carrascalão. Following his return, the Indonesian regime therefore imposed restrictions on his freedom.

However, in a 1997 contest for the vacant position of Rector of UnTim, against Natalino Monteiro, UnTim's then Vice Rector for Students Affairs, Maia, who had numerous supporters among the student body, emerged the victor, even though Monteiro was the pro-Indonesian candidate for the appointment, which required Indonesian military approval.

On the establishment in November 2000 of UnTim's successor, the National University of East Timor (UNTL), Maia took office as its first Rector.

== Political and further career ==
=== 2001–2006: Minister ===
On 30 September 2001, Maia, who was not then a member of a political party, was appointed as the Minister of Education, Culture and Youth in East Timor's II UNTAET Transitional Government established by Sérgio Vieira de Mello, the United Nations administrator for East Timor.

Maia retained that post, with added responsibility for Sports, in the I Constitutional Government of East Timor under Prime Minister Mari Alkatiri, which took office on 20 May 2002. When that government was restructured on 26 July 2005, Maia retained direct responsibility for education and culture, and José Manuel Fernandes was appointed as Secretary of State for Youth and Sports. On 14 July 2006, the I Constitutional Government was replaced by the II Constitutional Government, and Maia was succeeded as Minister by Rosária Corte-Real.

=== 2006–2020: Return to academia ===
Maia then returned to UNTL, as a Senior Lecturer. From July 2012, he was a PhD candidate at the State, Society and Governance in Melanesia Program in the ANU College of Asia and the Pacific in Canberra, Australia.

=== 2020–2023: Minister again ===
On 24 June 2020, following a change in the governing coalition, and the admission of Fretilin to the VIII Constitutional Government, Maia was sworn in for a further term as Minister of Education, Youth and Sport.

Since being reappointed as Minister, Maia has worked on improving East Timor's school education system. In August 2020, he announced that he had held discussions for the implementation of sports in schools, and said that a program would be included in the Ministry's proposal for the next State budget. In November 2020, he confirmed that throughout 2021, significant construction and rehabilitation would be carried out at 221 schools and to 1,500 classrooms. On International Literacy Day 2021, he called on parents to send their children to school: "Education, as well as learning, is ageless." The same day, he announced that he had requested that his Ministry's budget for the 2022 fiscal year be increased by US$13 million from its proposed US$80 million allocation, to ensure that the Ministry had sufficient funds to implement all of the programs that it had prepared.

In August 2022, Maia admitted publicly that only 28% of children had access to kindergarten in East Timor. He noted that this was due to an inadequate budget allocation of only 2% of the Ministry's funds. He urged the relevant government entities to cooperate with the Ministry in increasing the allocation. Later that month, a Ministry team led by Maia concluded regional and national consultations on 'Transforming Education' that had been aimed at formulating plans for making education in East Timor more equitable and improving its quality. The consultations were also intended to inform the creation of a National Statement of Commitment that would be presented to a United Nations summit in September 2022. According to Maia:

"Over the past 20 years, there have been many achievements for education in Timor-Leste, including increased net enrolment in primary schools. Yet, many challenges remain, with only 25 percent of children accessing preschool, high dropout rates, low achievement in literacy, low enrolment of children with disabilities, and growing inequality between wealth groups and regions.

We have to do better, to deliver the knowledge and skills that children, young people and adults, need to excel in today's world and contribute to a better Timor-Leste for everyone."

On International Literacy Day 2022, Maia confirmed that the government was committed to the combatting of illiteracy. In East Timor, the literacy rate had been increasing rapidly; Maia observed that the government was collaborating with UNESCO and had been cooperating with the government of Cuba in implementing programs for its further increase.

In November 2022, Maia stated that the Ministry would intensify cooperation with Portugal on two projects in the field of education and training, and in partnership with other Portuguese-speaking countries to support teacher training. In January 2023, Maia announced that the government would change the law to mandate the use of the Portuguese language during lessons in East Timorese schools. Commentators noted that the government and the Ministry believed that potential economic benefits from other Portuguese-speaking countries were an incentive for such a measure.

The protocol relating to one of the cooperation projects with Portugal was signed by Maia and his Portuguese counterpart in Dili in March 2023.

Meanwhile, in December 2022, Maia signed a tripartite Memorandum of Understanding (MoU) between the World Food Programme (WFP), the Ministry, and the Ministry of State Administration, for the continuation and expansion of East Timor's National School Feeding Programme, which had been managed by the Ministry since 2011 after being introduced to East Timor by the WFP in 2005.

The following month, on International Day of Education 2023, Maia emphasised the importance of education as a pillar of development in East Timor:

"If we invest in the future of children, we are investing in the future of Timor – Leste. If we do not invest in education, it is the same as having an abundance of natural resources but we continue to mark the pace."

He added that investment in education should be comprehensive, and include the improvement of infrastructure, training and curriculum, along with educational organizations and classroom management.

Maia's tenure as Minister ended when the IX Constitutional Government took office on 1 July 2023. He was succeeded by Dulce de Jesus Soares. He now heads the Human Rights Centre at the National University of Timor Lorosae.

== Honours ==
Ribbon	Award	Date awarded	Notes
	Insignia of the Order of Timor-Leste	20 May 2011	
