= MFAC =

MFAC may refer to:

- Matthew Flinders Anglican College
- Ministry of Foreign Affairs and Cooperation (Timor-Leste)
