= Jorge Teme =

East Timorese politician and diplomat

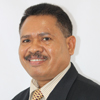

Member of the National Parliament
- In office 16 February 2015 – 22 July 2017

Minister of State Administration
- In office 8 August 2012 – 16 February 2015
- Prime Minister: Xanana Gusmão

Secretary of State for the Region of Oecusse
- In office 8 August 2007 – 8 August 2012
- Prime Minister: Xanana Gusmão

East Timorese Ambassador to Australia
- In office 29 May 2003 – August 2005

Vice-Minister of Foreign Affairs and Cooperation
- In office 20 September 2001 – March 2003
- Leader: Mari Alkatiri; (as Chief Minister to 20 May 2002); (as Prime Minister from 20 May 2002)

Personal details
- Born: 24 May 1964 (age 62) Naimeco, Portuguese Timor (now East Timor)
- Party: Fretilin (to 2011); Frenti-Mudança (since 2011)
- Education: Massey University

Jorge da Conceição Teme (born 24 May 1964) is an East Timorese politician and diplomat. Initially, he was a member of the Fretilin political party, but he left that party in 2011 to join the Frenti-Mudança party. He has been Vice Minister of Foreign Affairs and Cooperation, East Timorese Ambassador to Australia, Secretary of State for the Region of Oecusse and Minister of State Administration.

== Early life and education ==
Teme is from the East Timorese exclave of Oecusse, on the north coast of west Timor.

In 1998, Teme received a scholarship from the New Zealand Overseas Development Agency (now the New Zealand Agency for International Development) and relocated to Palmerston North, New Zealand, where he also worked with activists for the liberation of East Timor from Indonesian occupation. Additionally, he became the spokesman for the East Timor Students Association (ETSA) in New Zealand. He studied at Massey University, which awarded him a Master's degree in Policy and Politics of Development in 2002.

During the 1999 East Timorese crisis, Teme's family home was burned down, so that Teme and his wife and children were initially without their own accommodation when they returned to East Timor.

== Political career ==
In the Parliamentary election held on 30 August 2001, Teme was no. 12 on the Fretilin list, and was elected to the Constituent Assembly, from which the National Parliament later emerged. However, on 20 September 2001 he was appointed as Vice Minister for Foreign Affairs and Cooperation in the II UNTAET Transitional Government. Teme remained in that office after the transition of East Timor to independence on 20 May 2002, as part of the I Constitutional Government led by Prime Minister Mari Alkatiri.

From 29 May 2003 to August 2005, Teme was East Timor's first ambassador to Australia. He was also responsible for other countries, such as New Zealand and Samoa. Due to the unrest in East Timor in 2006, Prime Minister Alkatiri was forced to resign, and within Fretilin there was an attempt to remove him as its general secretary. Teme joined the Fretilin Mudança reform movement, and in the 2007 presidential election campaign he supported the new prime minister and independent candidate José Ramos-Horta against his party leader Francisco Guterres. Shortly before the first ballot in that election, Teme was accused of alleged sexual harassment of an embassy worker.

In August 2007, Teme became Secretary of State for the Region of Oecusse in the IV Constitutional Government under Prime Minister Xanana Gusmão, although his party, Fretilin, was in opposition to the ruling coalition. Subsequently, the Fretilin Mudança group split off from Fretilin as Frenti-Mudança (FM), and Teme became its Secretary General. In the parliamentary election of 2012, FM ran for the first time with its own list, and won two seats. On 8 August 2012, Teme was sworn in as Minister of State Administration in the V Constitutional Government, a coalition between the National Congress for Timorese Reconstruction (CNRT), the Democratic Party (PD) and FM; he therefore renounced his seat in the national parliament.

In February 2015, when Prime Minister Xanana Gusmão resigned and the new VI Constitutional Government of national unity was formed under Fretilin member Rui Maria de Araújo, Teme rejected an offer to be a Vice Minister in that government. Instead, he resumed his seat in Parliament and became deputy parliamentary leader of the two-member FM parliamentary delegation.

Teme is one of the founders of the Amigos de Taur Matan Ruak (A-TMR) movement, which supported the former president and his People's Liberation Party (PLP) in the campaign for the parliamentary election of 2017, regardless of party affiliation. As the FM failed to overcome the four percent threshold hurdle in the election, Teme lost his seat in the National Parliament.

== Publications ==
- The impact of foreign aid on recipient countries: a case study of foreign aid flow to East Timor in reconstructing and developing the country post-independence (Palmerston North: MPhil thesis, Massey University of New Zealand, 2001; OCLC 155419130)
- Baikenu Language Manual for the Oecussi-Ambeno Enclave (East Timor) (with Geoffrey Hull and Francisco do Amaral) (Winston Hills, NSW, Australia: Sebastião Aparício da Silva Project, 2001; ISBN 1864087064)
- Tetum, Language Manual for East Timor (5th ed.) (with Geoffrey Hull and Dionísio Babo Soares) (Winston Hills, NSW, Australia: Sebastião Aparício da Silva Project, 2005; ISBN 186341875X)
