= Escola Secundária Técnica-Vocacional Combatentes e Veteranos =

Location
- Rua Pouzada Postu Antigu; Same, Manufahi; Timor-Leste

Information
- Type: Private vocational secondary school
- Established: 29 November 2015; 10 years ago
- Teaching staff: 23 (2019)
- Grades: 10–12
- Enrollment: 205 (2019)
- Website: Official Facebook page

Escola Secundária Técnica-Vocacional Combatentes e Veteranos (ESTV–COVEM) is a private technical-vocational secondary school in Same, Manufahi Municipality, Timor-Leste. Established in 2015, the school is affiliated with a local veterans' association and has 205 students in grades 10–12 as of 2019. The school is located in a Portuguese-era school building and historic site where a massacre occurred in January 1976 when Fretilin killed around 30 political prisoners during the Indonesian invasion of East Timor.

== History ==
ESTV–COVEM's building dates to the Portuguese colonial period, when it functioned as Same's primary school. Following the Indonesian invasion of East Timor in December 1975, the nationalist party Fretilin used the school to hold political prisoners who were members of the pro-Indonesian Timorese Popular Democratic Association (Apodeti) and conservative Timorese Democratic Union (UDT) parties. As Fretilin forces retreated south from Maubisse to Same in late December 1975, they marched 300-400 detainees with them, who were divided into groups based on Fretilin's assessment of their threat level. The "most dangerous" prisoners were held in an underground cell at a local government building, while those considered less dangerous were held at the Same primary school.

By late January 1976, the Indonesian forces were closing in on Fretilin's position in Same from both the north and south. On 28 January 1976, 34 detainees were transferred from nearby Holarua to Same, where they joined 10 other prisoners in the primary school building. The next morning, 11 prisoners were taken from the school in a vehicle; suspecting they were about to be executed, they broke free of the rope binding them and jumped out. Nine of the detainees managed to escape, while two others were killed in the attempt. Angered by the escape, on 29 January 1976, Fretilin official César Maulaka stormed into the school with three men who began firing on the prisoners. After their ammunition ran out, three more men began firing on the crowd, and then another three. Before leaving, they threw a grenade into the room. Around 30 people were killed in the massacre, with only four survivors who managed to escape by jumping out of windows. In 2023, the school building was designated as a historical site by the Centro Nacional Chega!

ESTV–COVEM was established on 29 November 2015. On 2 June 2020, the school received its operational license from the Ministry of Education, Youth and Sport. In 2020, Nobel Peace Prize laureate and future President of Timor-Leste José Ramos-Horta visited the school.

== Campus ==
ESTV–COVEM is located in the town of Same in Rialau aldeia (sub-village), Letefoho suco, Same Administrative Post. In 2019, the school building was reported to be in poor condition, with collapsing ceilings, holes in the roof and walls, a lack of electricity and running water, and no books. Some of the classrooms on the campus have been unusable since the school's founding, with only six classrooms in usable condition. Due to the poor condition of the school's roof and ceilings, water often enters the classrooms during wet season.

== Governance ==
ESTV–COVEM is a private school run by a local veterans' association. It has an operational license from the Ministry of Education, Youth and Sport to provide technical-vocational secondary education. Though it is private, its campus is a state-owned property and the government has supported the school by providing tables and chairs.

== Academics ==
ESTV–COVEM is a technical-vocational school for students in grades 10, 11, and 12. It offers three course tracks: tourism and hospitality, civil construction, and information technology. In 2019, the tourism and hospitality program faced challenges, with students having to bring their own materials from home.

As of 2019, the school had 205 students and 23 teachers, all of whom held bachelor's degrees.

== See also ==
- List of secondary schools in Timor-Leste
