= Escola Secundária Geral Fitun Naroman Timor Lorosa'e =

Escola Secundária Geral FINANTIL
- Eskola Sekundária Jeral FINANTIL

Location
- Rua de Aimutin; Aimutin, Comoro, Dili; Timor-Leste

Information
- Type: Public secondary school
- Established: 5 June 2000; 26 years ago
- School number: 777
- Director: Aniceto Berlelo
- Teaching staff: 60 (2026)
- Grades: 10–12
- Enrollment: 1,324 (2025)
  - Grade 10: 350
  - Grade 11: 389
  - Grade 12: 585
- Campus type: Urban
- Website: Official Facebook page

Escola Secundária Geral Fitun Naroman Timor Lorosa'e (ESG FINANTIL; Tetun: Eskola Sekundária Jeral Fitun Naroman Timor Lorosa'e) is a public secondary school in Dili, Timor-Leste, located in the Aimutin, Comoro area. Established in 2000, it has 1,324 students in grades 10–12 as of 2025. Since its early years, the school has experienced longstanding issues related to limited resources, overcrowding, violence, and flooding. The government has announced plans to reconstruct the school in 2027.

== History ==
ESG FINANTIL was established on 5 June 2000. Located in the Aimutin area of Comoro, Dili, its campus was built on land offered by the local community. In the early 2000s, the school operated a short-lived university known as Universidade Jupiter (UNTER). The school has experienced longstanding issues related to limited resources, overcrowding, violence, and flooding.

On 1 March 2010, police detained six students after violence broke out in the street between groups of students from ESG FINANTIL and nearby ESG 10 de Dezembro. Violence once again occurred between FINANTIL and 10 de Dezembro students on 7 July 2011, when students began throwing stones during a school ceremony at ESG FINANTIL. Police arrested three students and detained them for 24 hours before releasing them without charge, in line with standard police practice at the time. School officials cited martial arts gangs, which many students are members of, as the root cause of the violence. In July 2024, the National Police of Timor-Leste led a violence prevention awareness activity at ESG FINANTIL. In July 2025, the police led violence prevention dialogue activities involving students and teachers from FINANTIL and 10 de Dezembro secondary schools, and pledged to guarantee security in the area around the two schools.

In recent years, ESG FINANTIL has drawn attention for overcrowding, inadequate facilities, and flooding. In May 2024, school administrators appealed to the Ministry of Education to supply the school with new desks and chairs, many of which were damaged in the April 2021 flooding caused by Cyclone Seroja and had not been replaced. This, combined with severe overcrowding, with class sizes numbering around 60 students, created conditions in which many students were left to stand during lessons. Due to space constraints, the school's 1,899 students then attended classes in two sessions, with year 10 and 12 students taking lessons in the morning and year 11 students in the afternoon. In October 2024, an inspection by the National Parliament's education committee raised concerns after observing more than 80 students in a single classroom at the school during that year's national examination. The school director rejected the committee's finding, stating that the school abided by a policy of 25 students per classroom, and criticized the government for not improving conditions at the school.

In 2024, the school was identified by Dili Municipality education inspectors as one of several schools in Dili that did not sufficiently care for its library or offer adequate library access to students. In October 2025, 17 ESG FINANTIL students were prevented from taking the national examination because their academic documents were incomplete. Meanwhile, 585 students from the school sat for the examination, 333 in the science and technology course and 252 in the social science and humanities track.

ESG FINANTIL has experienced teacher shortages on several occasions. In 2024, the school had a teaching staff of 61, but lacked teachers for Portuguese and multimedia subjects. In January 2026, the school lacked teachers for physical education, Portuguese, and Tetun. School director Aniceto Berlelo noted that the Ministry of Education had reassigned 18 of the school's 78 teachers to other schools, contributing to the shortage. In response, the Ministry of Education pledged to work with the municipality education authorities to assign new teachers to ESG FINANTIL to teach the subjects in question.

On 5 June 2025, ESG FINANTIL celebrated its 25th anniversary. In recent years, the government has begun developing plans to reconstruct the school to address longstanding issues with the existing campus, including frequent flooding, overcrowding, and the lack of a computer lab. In 2024, it was announced that the Ministry of Public Works would coordinate with the Ministry of Education to build a new facility for the school. In 2025, school administrators announced that the Ministry of Education had accepted the school's proposal to reconstruct the campus in 2026. In the wake of flooding in January 2026 that inundated the campus, the government announced that a new school building would be constructed in 2027.

== Campus ==
The school has seven buildings containing 16 classrooms along with a director's office, two teachers' offices, a library, and four bathrooms. The school has no science or computer laboratories. The school has longstanding flooding issues, with the campus typically flooding every year during wet season. The school's outdoor areas are most frequently affected, but when water levels rise high enough, five classrooms that sit at a lower elevation also flood.

== Governance ==
ESG FINANTIL is a public school governed by the Ministry of Education and the Dili Municipality education directorate. As of 2026, the school director is Aniceto Berlelo.

== Academics ==
In May 2024, the school had 1,899 students—373 in year 10, 661 in year 11, and 865 in year 12. In the 2025 academic year, the school had 1,324 students—350 in year 10, 389 in year 11, and 585 in year 12. Due to space constraints, the school operates with two daily sessions, with some students taking classes in the morning and others in the afternoon. As of January 2026, the school has 60 teaching staff. In addition to implementing the state curriculum, the school provides spiritual education each month with support from the nearby Paróquia São José Aimutin. The school offers two educational tracks, a science and technology course and a social science and humanities course.

== Notable alumni ==
- José Vieira de Araújo, secretary of state for livestock in the IX Constitutional Government

== See also ==
- List of secondary schools in Timor-Leste
