= Irena Cristalis =

Dutch journalist and photographer

Irene Cristalis
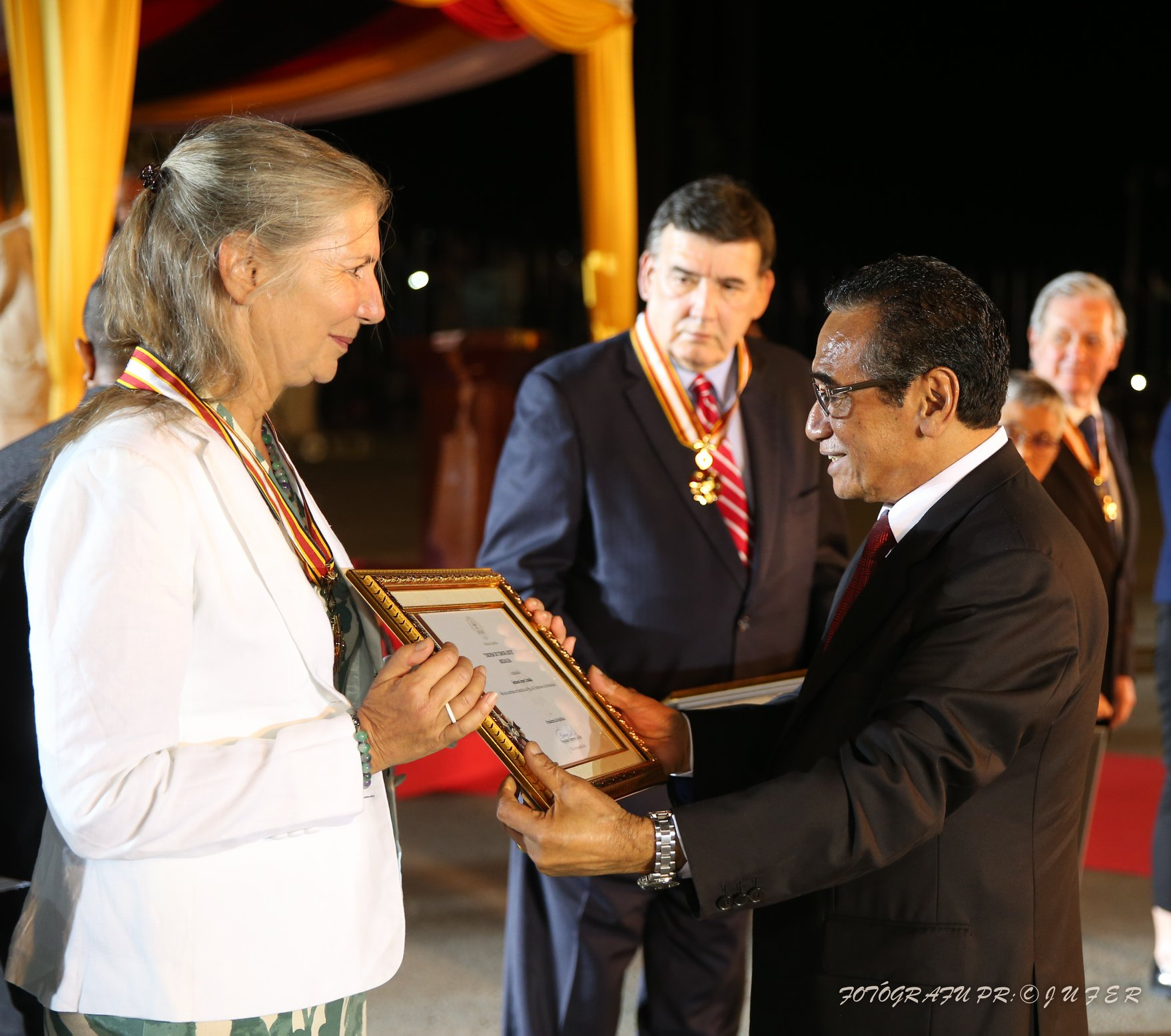
- Irena Cristalis receives the Order of Timor-Leste from Francisco Guterres at the celebrations marking the twentieth anniversary of the independence referendum.
- Born: 1959 (age 66–67)
- Occupations: Journalist photographer
- Years active: From 1980s

Irena Cristalis, born in 1959, is a Dutch investigative journalist, photographer and author who worked in Asia since the mid-1980s. From the 1990s, she reported for international media outlets such as the BBC, The Economist , and Radio Netherlands from East Timor.

She was awarded the medal of the Order of Timor-Leste on August 30, 2019 by Francisco Guterre, the then president of the now independent East Timor

== Publication ==
- Bitter dawn: East Timor, a people's story , 2002.
- Independent women: the story of women's activism in East Timor , 2005, co authored with Catherine Scott and Ximena Andrade.
- Perempuan merdeka: Kisah activisme hardly perempuan di Timor Leste , 2007.
- East Timor – A Nation's Bitter Dawn , 2009.
- Feast! : stories on food and love , 2019, co authored with Swee Fong Wong and others.
