= Adaljiza Magno =

East Timorese politician and diplomat (born 1975)

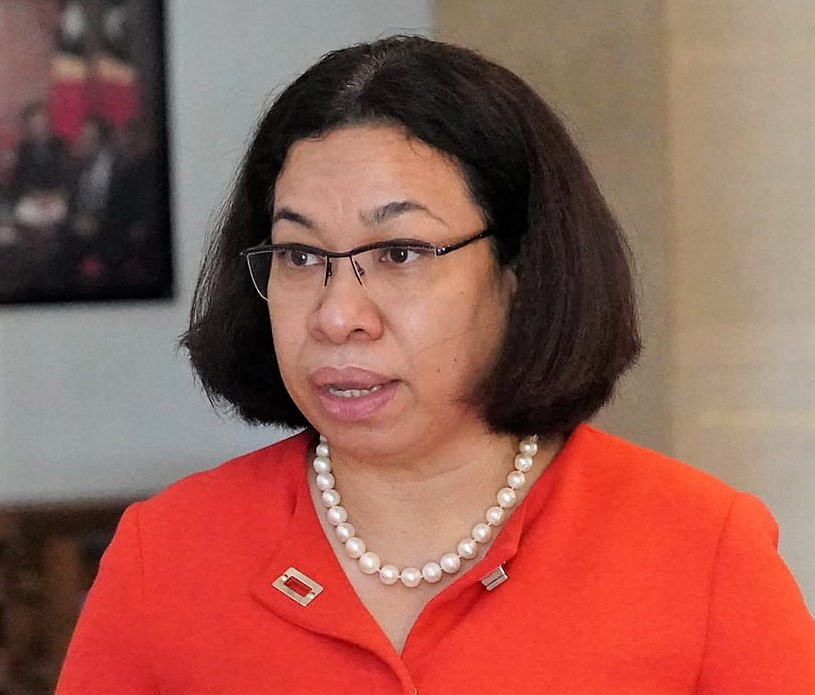
- Magno in 2022

Minister of Foreign Affairs and Cooperation
- In office 24 June 2020 – 1 July 2023
- Prime Minister: Taur Matan Ruak
- Preceded by: Dionísio Babo Soares
- Succeeded by: Bendito Freitas

Vice Minister of Foreign Affairs and Cooperation
- In office 17 October 2017 – 22 June 2018
- Prime Minister: Mari Alkatiri
- Preceded by: Roberto Soares
- Succeeded by: Julião da Silva
- In office 26 July 2005 – 8 August 2007
- Prime Minister: Mari Alkatiri; (to 10 July 2006); José Ramos-Horta; (10 July 2006 – 19 May 2007); Estanislau da Silva; (from 19 May 2007)

East Timorese Ambassador to Singapore
- In office 19 November 2015 – October 2017

Member of the Constituent Assembly / National Parliament
- In office 2001–2005

Personal details
- Born: 7 January 1975 (age 51): Baguia, Portuguese Timor; (now East Timor)
- Party: Fretilin
- Spouse: Rosantino Amado Hei dos Anjos
- Children: 2
- Education: Sebelas Maret University; Victoria University of Wellington

Adaljiza Albertina Xavier Reis Magno (born 7 January 1975) is an East Timorese politician and diplomat, and a member of the Fretilin political party.

From June 2020 to July 2023, she was the Minister of Foreign Affairs and Cooperation, serving in the VIII Constitutional Government of East Timor led by Prime Minister Taur Matan Ruak.

Previously, she served several terms as Vice Minister in that portfolio, and briefly, in 2007, as acting Minister. She has also been the East Timorese Ambassador to Singapore.

== Early life and career ==
Magno was born in Baguia, in the then Portuguese Timor, to Ana Xavier G. Magno and Alberto dos Reis Magno. Eleven months after her birth, Indonesia began its occupation of East Timor. Magno's family fled to Mount Matebian, a centre of the Fretilin resistance against the occupiers. The family lived on the run for four years before returning to Baguia in 1979. In 1980, the family surrendered to the Indonesian army because its members were in danger of starvation.

Magno attended primary school from 1982 to 1987, pre-secondary school from 1987 to 1990 and secondary school in Dili from 1990 to 1993. She graduated from the Sebelas Maret University (UNS) in Surakarta, Central Java, Indonesia, with a degree in economics.

Even before commencing her political career, Magno was a prominent activist in the women's movement. During her studies in Indonesia, she was active in the student movement that worked for East Timor’s independence. From 1993 to 1998, she was a member of the Union of Catholic University Students of the Republic of Indonesia (PMKRI) in Surakarta, and in 1998 she joined the SAHE Study Club based in Jakarta, Indonesia. At the same time, she was founder of the Communication Forum for Timor Lorosae's Women (FORELSAN) in Yogyakarta, Indonesia.

Magno returned to her homeland for the 1999 referendum on whether East Timor should be independent from Indonesia. After the announcement of the result, which was in favour of independence, there were massive attacks by pro-Indonesian militias on the population. Magno and her family, like many other residents, fled to Kupang on the western side of Timor island. When militias attacked the refugees there too, the family fled to Bali and did not return to East Timor until after the international intervention force INTERFET arrived in October 1999.

In 1999, Magno was a co-founder of the Sahe Institute for Liberation (SIL), a non-governmental organization that advocates education for the population. She worked for SIL until 2001. From November 1999 to June 2000, she also worked for the human rights organization HAK as its Popular Education Coordinator, and for the Communication Forum for East Timor Women (FOKUPERS). In 2000, she represented the East Timor Trade Union Confederation (TLTUC/KSTL) at the 88th Conference of the International Labour Organization (ILO) in Geneva. In the same year, she took part in an East Timor Action Network (ETAN) speaking tour, which took her to 22 states in the USA. She also taught human rights at the National University of East Timor (UNTL).

In 2001, Magno was appointed to the organizing committee for the establishment of the East Timor Women's Network. From June to August 2001, she was a consultant to the United Nations Population Fund (UNFPA) in relation to its report on domestic violence in East Timor.

== Political career ==
Also in 2001, Magno was elected as one of 55 Fretilin candidates to the Constituent Assembly of East Timor, from which the National Parliament emerged in 2002.

Upon the restructuring of the I Constitutional Government, led by Mari Alkatiri, in July 2005, Magno was appointed as Vice Minister of Foreign Affairs and Cooperation. At 30 years of age, she became the youngest member of that government. On 14 July 2006, the I Constitutional Government was replaced by the II Constitutional Government led by José Ramos-Horta, in which Magno continued to serve as Vice Minister of Foreign Affairs and Cooperation. She left that office on 8 August 2007, upon the formation of the IV Constitutional Government.

During the short period, between 19 May and 8 August 2007, when the transitional III Constitutional Government, led by Estanislau da Silva, was in power, Magno served not only as Vice Minister, but also as acting Minister, of Foreign Affairs and Cooperation. She was also the 60th candidate on the Fretilin list for the 2007 Parliamentary election, but was not elected, as Fretilin won only 21 seats in the election.

While serving in public offices between 2002 and 2007, Magno was also a board member of two civil society organisations, HAK and FOKUPERS. In 2007, she represented those organizations at the 3rd East Timor donors meeting in Canberra, Australia. Between 2011 and 2013, she completed a master's degree in Public Management at Victoria University of Wellington, New Zealand. In 2014 and 2015, she was a member of East Timor's delegation to the Preparatory Commission for the 10th Summit of Heads of State and Government of the Community of Portuguese Language Countries (CPLP), which was held in Dili in July 2014, and an Adviser (Conceptual) to the CPLP's Presidential Support Office.

On 19 November 2015, Magno was appointed as the East Timorese Ambassador to Singapore. On 2 October 2017, she was reappointed as Vice Minister for Foreign Affairs and Cooperation, in the VII Constitutional Government led by Mari Alkatiri. Her swearing-in did not take place the following day alongside that of most of the other members of the new government, because she was still in Singapore. On 17 October 2017, she was finally sworn in. Her renewed tenure as Vice Minister ended with the formation of the VIII Constitutional Government on 22 June 2018.

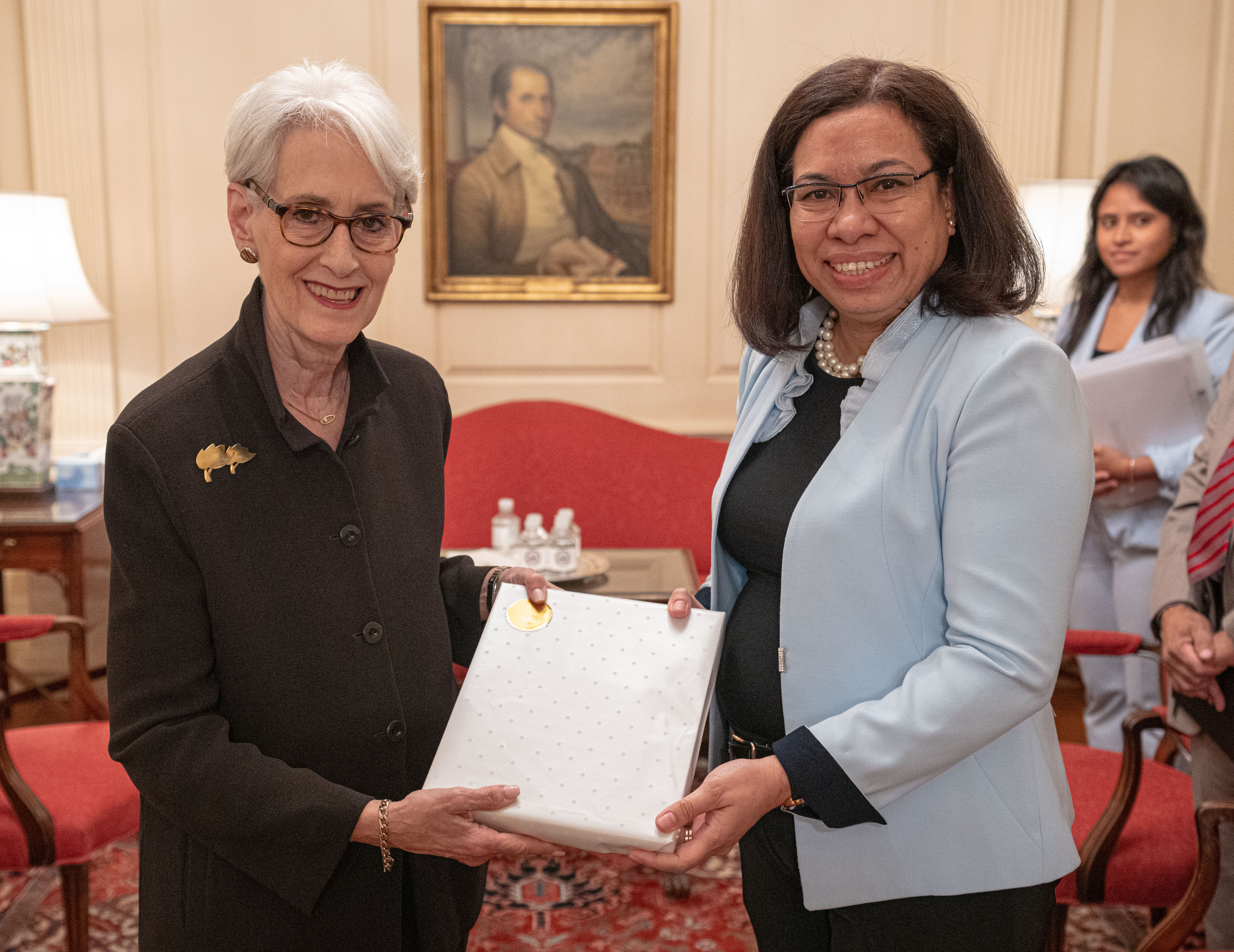
Magno with U.S. Deputy Secretary of State Wendy Sherman in 2022

Two years later, on 24 June 2020, following a change in the governing coalition, and the admission of Fretilin to the VIII Constitutional Government, Magno was sworn in as Minister of Foreign Affairs and Cooperation.

Magno's tenure as Minister ended when the IX Constitutional Government took office on 1 July 2023. She was succeeded by Bendito Freitas.

== Personal life ==
Magno is fluent in Tetum, Portuguese, Makasae (a Papuan language spoken in her native municipality of Baucau), Indonesian, and English.

In October 2003, she married Rosantino Amado Hei dos Anjos. The couple has a daughter and a son.
