= Dulce de Jesus Soares =

East Timorese politician

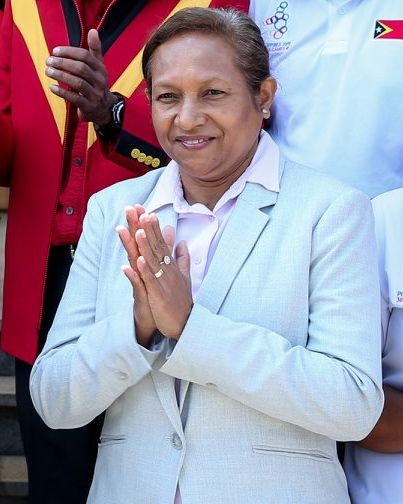
- Soares in 2019

Minister of Education
- Incumbent
- Assumed office 1 July 2023
- President: José Ramos-Horta
- Prime Minister: Xanana Gusmão
- Preceded by: Armindo Maia

Minister of Education, Youth and Sport
- In office 22 June 2018 – 25 May 2020
- President: Francisco Guterres
- Prime Minister: Taur Matan Ruak
- Preceded by: Fernando Hanjam
- Succeeded by: Armindo Maia

Deputy Minister of Education I
- In office 16 February 2015 – 15 September 2017
- President: Taur Matan Ruak
- Prime Minister: Rui Maria de Araújo
- Succeeded by: Lurdes Maria Bessa

Deputy Minister of Basic Education
- In office 8 August 2012 – 16 February 2015
- President: Taur Matan Ruak
- Prime Minister: Xanana Gusmão
- Preceded by: Paulo Assis Belo

Personal details
- Born: 20 October 1967 (age 58) Maliana, Portuguese Timor
- Party: National Congress for Timorese Reconstruction (CNRT)
- Education: Udayana University (BA); Victoria University (MA)

Dulce de Jesus Soares (born 20 October 1967) is an East Timorese politician who has served as Minister of Education in Timor-Leste's IX Constitutional Government since 2023. A member of the National Congress for Timorese Reconstruction (CNRT) party, she previously served as Minister of Education, Youth and Sport in the VIII Constitutional Government from 2018 to 2020. She served as a deputy minister of education in early governments from 2012 to 2015 and again from 2015 to 2017. (Note: The Constitution of East Timor provides, in sections 104 and 105, for the appointment of officials referred to in its English language version as "Deputy Ministers". In other English language publications, those officials are commonly referred to as "Vice Ministers", even though the word "Vice", in context, arguably has a different meaning in English from the word "Deputy". In this article, the constitutional expression "Deputy" is used.)

Born in Maliana, she completed her undergraduate education in Indonesia and later earned a master's degree in Australia. She began her career as an English teacher and then became a regional planning official in the Bobonaro Municipality government. Before entering government, she was a program officer with UNICEF working on developing Timor-Leste's laws and policies related to children's rights.

== Early life and education ==
Soares was born on 20 October 1967 in Maliana, Portuguese Timor, in what is now Bobonaro Municipality. She grew up in a remote area of Bobonaro, where her father was a teacher at a Catholic school. Because the school only enrolled boys, at age six she went to live with her grandparents so she could attend primary school. There, she completed grades one and two before her education was disrupted by the Indonesian invasion of East Timor in 1975. After the invasion, she moved to the town of Balibo to continue her primary education. She described her schooling in the early years of the Indonesian occupation of East Timor as difficult due to the abrupt shift to Indonesian as the medium of instruction.

After completing primary school, Soares moved to Dili, the provincial capital, to begin her secondary education as there was no secondary school in her area of Bobonaro at the time. Upon graduating high school, she was selected for an Indonesian government scholarship for students from East Timor to attend university in Indonesia. She studied at Udayana University in Bali, Indonesia between July 1986 and December 1991, graduating with a Bachelor of Arts in education. She later studied at Victoria University in Melbourne, Australia, from June 2005 to December 2007, earning a Master of Arts in international community development. On 16 September 2022, Victoria University honored Soares with an Honorary Doctorate.

== Career ==
Upon returning to East Timor from Bali, Soares was sent by the provincial governor to teach English at a Catholic school in Fuiloro, Lautém, run by the Salesian religious order. She later joined the Indonesian civil service as head of the social and cultural sector for Bobonaro's regional planning office, and at the same time coordinated a UNICEF program. After Timor-Leste's independence in 2002, UNICEF recruited Soares to rejoin the organization. She served as a national program officer, working with international partners to develop laws and policies related to children's rights, including the establishment of Timor-Leste's National Commission for Children's Rights.

A member of the National Congress for Timorese Reconstruction (CNRT) party, Soares served as Deputy Minister of Basic Education in Timor-Leste's V Constitutional Government, led by Prime Minister Xanana Gusmão from 8 August 2012 to 16 February 2015. In the cabinet reshuffle following Rui Maria de Araújo's appointment as prime minister, she was named Deputy Minister of Education I in the VI Constitutional Government, a position she held from 16 February 2015 to 15 September 2017. Following the unexpected death of education minister Fernando de Araújo on 2 June 2015, Soares served as interim minister until the new education minister, António da Conceição, was sworn in.

In these roles, Soares oversaw several significant educational reforms, including revisions to preschool and primary school curricula, advocating for mother-tongue education, and new policies related to educational access and inclusion. She also addressed serious deficiencies in school facilities, with many schools experiencing overcrowded classrooms and a lack of chairs and desks, forcing students to learn while sitting on the ground. During her tenure as deputy minister, the government distributed more than 100,000 chairs and tables to schools and initiated a community construction model that involved ordinary people in the building of classrooms for their local schools.

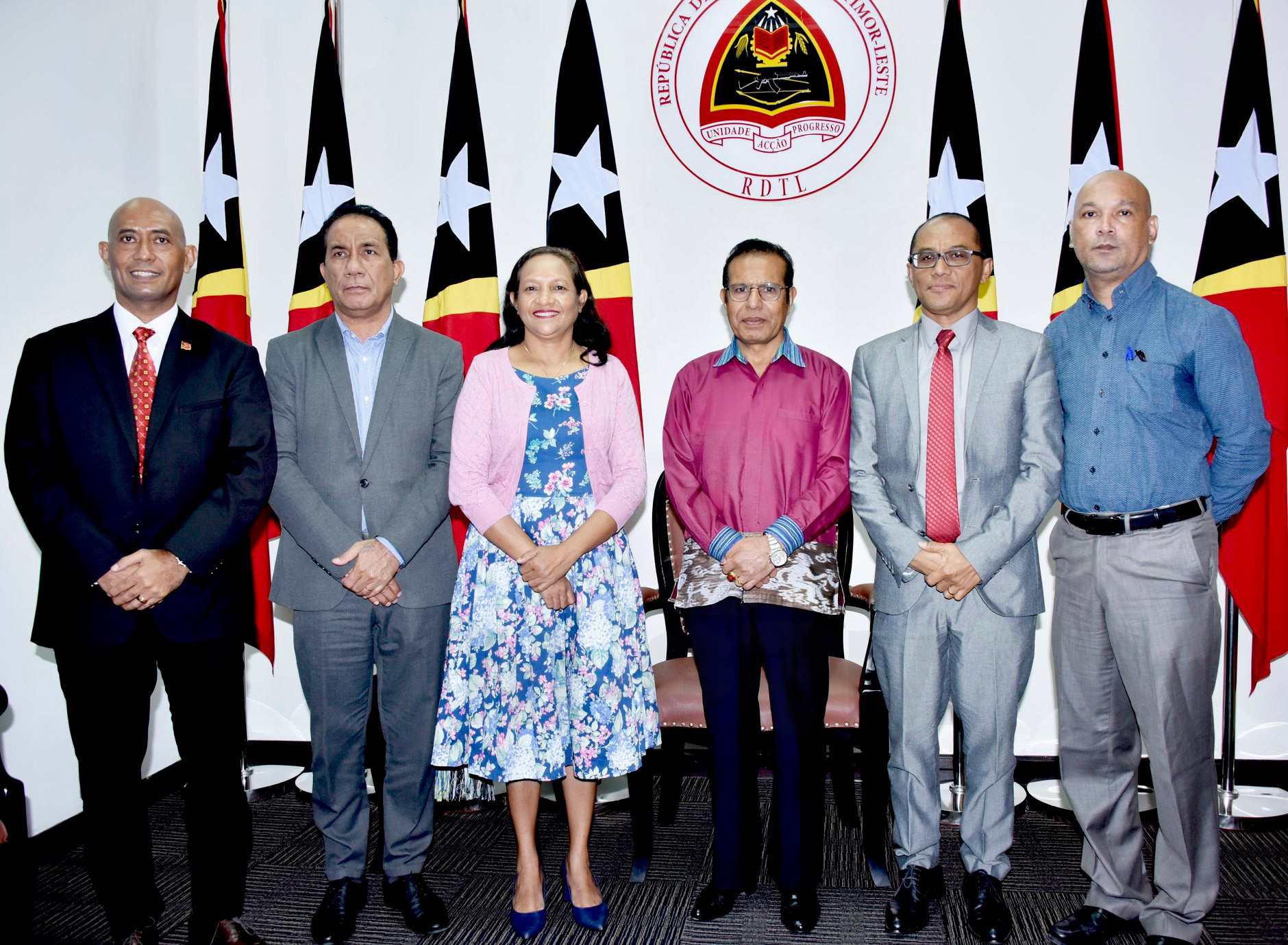
Soares with Prime Minister Taur Matan Ruak and other CNRT ministers on the day of their resignation from the VIII Constitutional Government, 25 May 2020.

On 22 June 2018, Soares was sworn in as Minister of Education, Youth and Sport in the VIII Constitutional Government under Prime Minister Taur Matan Ruak. Following the breakdown of the ruling coalition in the early months of 2020, the CNRT decided on 20 April 2020 that its members serving in the government would resign their positions. The CNRT informed the government of its decision on 8 May 2020, and Soares resigned on 25 May 2020 along with four other CNRT ministers.

Following her resignation from government, Soares worked coordinating donor aid projects related to COVID-19 pandemic relief from 2020 to 2021. Between April and May 2021, she worked as an education consultant for UNESCO's regional office in Bangkok, Thailand, her work focusing on education during the COVID-19 pandemic and disaster environments. From March to June 2022, she worked as an education consultant on child-friendly pedagogy for UNICEF in Angola.

In June 2022, Soares began serving as an education advisor to President of Timor-Leste José Ramos-Horta, with her role focusing on implementation of the government's literacy program. On 30 June 2023, Soares was appointed Minister of Education in the IX Constitutional Government led by Prime Minister Xanana Gusmão. She was sworn in along with the other newly-appointed members of government the following day in a ceremony held at Nicolau Lobato Presidential Palace in Dili.

== Personal life ==
Soares lives in the Palapaso neighborhood of Dili. She is Catholic. In addition to her mother tongue, Tetum, she speaks English, Indonesian, and Portuguese.
