= Ministry of Foreign Affairs and Cooperation =

Ministry of Foreign Affairs and Cooperation may refer to:

- Ministry of Foreign Affairs and International Cooperation (Morocco)
- Ministry of Foreign Affairs and Cooperation (Timor-Leste)
