= Filomeno Paixão =

East Timorese politician and former senior officer

Filomeno da Paixão de Jesus
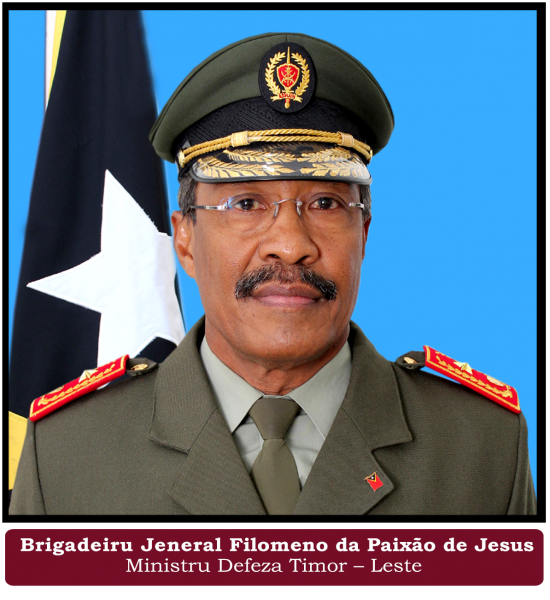
- Filomeno in 2019

Minister of Defense
- In office 9 July 2018 – 1 July 2023
- Prime Minister: Taur Matan Ruak
- Preceded by: Agostinho Sequeira Somotxo
- Succeeded by: Pedro Klamar Fuik

Personal details
- Born: 27 March 1953 (age 73): Bobonaro, Portuguese Timor; (now East Timor)
- Party: Independent
- Spouse: Maria José dos Mártires de Carvalho
- Children: 5
- Education: National University of East Timor

Brigadier General Filomeno da Paixão de Jesus (born 27 March 1953) is an East Timorese politician and former senior officer in the Timor Leste Defence Force (F-FDTL). From July 2018 to July 2023, he was Minister of Defense, serving in the VIII Constitutional Government of East Timor led by Prime Minister Taur Matan Ruak. Between October 2011 and July 2018, he was the Deputy Chief of the F-FDTL.

== Early life and career ==
Filomeno was born in Bobonaro, in the western part (which is known as Loro Munu) of the then Portuguese Timor. In 1973, he graduated from the Liceu Dr. Francisco Machado after completing seven years of secondary education.

From September 1971 to August 1975, Filomeno worked in the colonial financial administration of Portuguese Timor. In 1974, he was one of the founders of the Timorese Social Democratic Association (ASDT), which, in September 1975, renamed itself Fretilin. In November 1975, Fretilin unilaterally declared the independence of Portuguese Timor, and its Central Committee appointed Filomeno as Vice Secretary of Justice, assisting Justino Mota.

== Military career ==
Upon the Indonesian invasion of East Timor in 1975, Filomeno joined FALINTIL, which was then the military wing of Fretilin. From March to June 1976, he was a Platoon Commander, and from June to September 1976 he served as Commander of the then Liquiçá Subdistrict. Between September and November 1976, he was Secretary of the then Liquiçá District, and from January to October 1977, Political Assistant in the Northern Frontier Sector (Portuguese: Fronteira Norte).

In late 1977, Filomeno was appointed as 2nd Commander of the Northern Frontier Sector. Soon afterwards, he was promoted to Commander of that Sector. When the situation became too critical and there was a risk of death from disease and hunger, he contacted the Indonesian armed forces in Fatubessi, Ermera. On 7 February 1979, most of the East Timorese military and civilian leaders surrendered the Northern Frontier to the Indonesian Battalion 512.

In the aftermath of the visit of Pope John Paul II to East Timor in 1989, the Indonesian army subjected potential troublemakers to preventive detention to avert demonstrations in support of East Timorese independence. Among them was Filomeno, who was arrested in June 1990 and taken to the military base in Dili.

On 1 February 2001, according to a process that had begun in 1999, FALANTIL was transformed into the Defence Force of the soon-to-be independent Democratic Republic of East Timor, under the supervision of the United Nations. Simultaneously, Filomeno was promoted to lieutenant colonel, and appointed as chief of logistics. In February 2004, he became the Naval Commander, and in 2006 he was appointed Permanent Secretary of the Ministry of Defence. In September 2007, he was transferred to the post of Deputy Chief of the Defence Force, which he held until August 2008, when he was appointed as head of the Development Office of Planning for the "Force 2020" project.

Meanwhile, in early 2008, Filomeno served as first commander of Operation Halibur, a Joint Command of East Timor's Defence Force and several other agencies. The Joint Command was established to go after and capture Gastão Salsinha, the key living person suspected of committing the unsuccessful 11 February 2008 attacks on the President and Prime Minister of East Timor. On 25 April 2008, Salsinha agreed to surrender, and three days later the members of his group arrived in Dili and were arrested.

In January 2010, Filomeno was appointed as Chief of Staff, and in October 2011 he was promoted to Deputy Chief of the Defence Force.

On 9 February 2015, President Taur Matan Ruak announced that he would appoint Filomeno as the new Chief of the Defence Force to succeed Lere Anan Timur, and promote him from brigadier general to major general. However, such an appointment would have been at odds with the view of the Council of Ministers of the VI Constitutional Government, which had proposed on 12 October 2015 that Timur's mandate be renewed.

Following further discussions in April 2016, the President announced on 15 April 2016 that he had accepted one of two proposals presented by the Government on 13 April 2016. Under that proposal, which the President described as the "generational transition" proposal, he would appoint Captain of sea and war Donaciano Gomes, nom de guerre Pedro Klamar Fuik, as Chief of Defence Forces (CEMGFA), and Colonel Calisto dos Santos, nom de guerre Coliati, as his deputy. The President had previously rejected the other proposal, which had been that the mandates of Timur and Filomeno would be extended for two another years; both of them would now retire.

In the end, however, none of the proposed changes took place during the tenure of President Taur Matan Ruak. Eventually, on 5 October 2017, after the VII Constitutional Government had been formed, new President Francisco Guterres accepted a proposal by the new Government that Timur's and Filomeno's terms of office be extended for another year.

== Political career ==
In June 2018, Filomeno was nominated as Minister of Defense of the VIII Constitutional Government of East Timor that was being formed by Taur Matan Ruak, and resigned as Deputy Chief of the F-FDTL. However, he was absent from the Constitutional Government's swearing-in ceremony on 22 June 2018.

There were administrative problems. Filomeno's formal exoneration from his post as Deputy Chief of the F-FDTL had not yet been completed administratively. Such an exoneration can be pronounced by the President, but only on a proposal by the government, which had not yet been forthcoming.

On 5 July 2018, Filomeno was appointed as Minister by President Guterres; he was sworn in on 9 July 2018. He remained in that office notwithstanding the breakdown of the Alliance for Change and Progress (AMP) coalition during the first few months of 2020, and the consequent restructuring of the government in mid-2020.

Filomeno's tenure as Minister ended when the IX Constitutional Government took office on 1 July 2023. He was succeeded by Pedro Klamar Fuik.

== Personal life ==
Filomeno is the son of Miguel Faria de Jesus and Norberta Ximenes de Jesus. He is married to Maria José dos Mártires de Carvalho, and the couple has five children.

== Honours ==
Ribbon	Award	Date awarded	Notes
	Insignia of the Order of Timor-Leste	5 May 2017	
	Halibur Medal		
