= Medal of Merit (Timor-Leste) =

Medal of Merit Medalha de Mérito
- Ribbon bar of the medal
- Awarded for: Recognition of significant contributions to national peace and stability.
- Country: Timor-Leste
- Presented by: the President of Timor-Leste
- Eligibility: Civilians and military personnel including foreigners
- Established: 11 February 2009

Precedence
- Next (higher): Order of Timor-Leste
- Next (lower): Timor Leste Solidarity Medal

The Medal of Merit (Portuguese: Medalha de Mérito) is a state decoration of Timor-Leste. Established in 2009, it may be awarded to East Timorese and foreign civilian and military personnel.

== Criteria and award procedure ==
The Medal of Merit recognizes civilians and military personnel, both East Timorese and foreign citizens, who have made significant contributions to national peace and stability.

The process for awarding the medal begins with a nomination from civil and military forces, by the departments of the Public Administration, and by civil society in general, which are sent to the Office of the President of Timor-Leste. The President selects the recipients of the medal, as supported by the Medal of Merit Committee. The President may bestow, on an exceptional basis, this decoration without following the standard award procedures.

== Notable recipients ==
- Bambang Hendarso Danuri
- Francisco Guterres
- A.M. Hendropriyono
- Tito Karnavian
- Viktor Laiskodat
- Andika Perkasa
- Michael Slater
- Angus Campbell

== See also ==
- Orders, decorations, and medals of Timor-Leste
