= Rogério Lobato =

Timorese politician

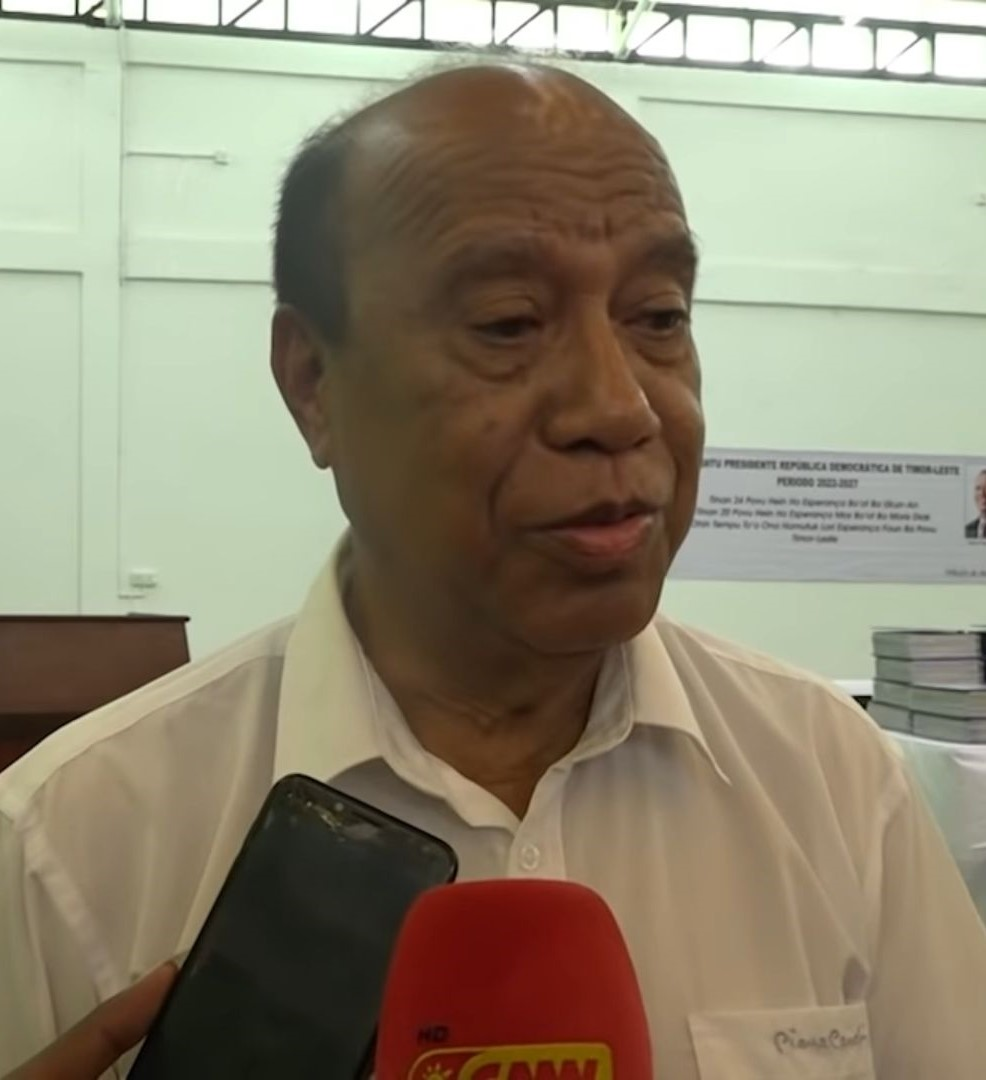
- Rogério Lobato in 2022

President of the Special Administrative Region of Oecusse-Ambeno
- Incumbent
- Assumed office 31 January 2024
- Preceded by: Arsénio Bano

Minister of the Interior
- In office 20 May 2002 – 1 June 2006
- President: Xanana Gusmão
- Prime Minister: Mari Alkatiri
- Preceded by: Antoninho Bianco
- Succeeded by: Alcino Baris

Minister of Defense
- In office 1 December 1975 – 17 December 1975
- Prime Minister: Nicolau Lobato
- Preceded by: Office established
- Succeeded by: Roque Rodrigues (2005)

Personal details
- Born: 25 July 1949 (age 77) Soibada, Portuguese Timor
- Spouse: Virginia De Araujo Soares
- Children: 5
- Parents: Narciso Lobato (father); Felismina Alves (mother)
- Relatives: Nicolau Lobato (brother)
- Occupation: Politician

Rogério Tiago de Fátima Lobato (born 25 July 1949) is a Timorese politician who was the former minister of defence and minister of interior belonging to Fretilin who is now the current president of the Special Administrative Region of Oecusse. He was a founding member of the first independent government of East Timor, in 1975, led by Fretilin. He is also the brother of the late Nicolau Lobato, the second president of the country who was killed in action by the Indonesian Army in late 1978.

In 2006 Lobato resigned as Minister over a dispute with the military over alleged discrimination. Lobato was jailed on five charges of arming civilians during the 2006 East Timorese crisis in March 2007 and sentenced seven and a half years in jail. The arming of civilians occurred after the country's police force had disintegrated, during a coup attempt.

In 2007, Rogério Lobato tried to leave the country to go to Malaysia for heart surgery resulting in a standoff at Dili Airport.

In 2008, President José Ramos-Horta reduced Lobato's jail sentence by half.

Lobato began his political career as part of Fretilin when it declared independence in November 1975. 3 December that year he departed East Timor with fellow Fretilin member Mari Alkatiri to promote the interests of the new country. Following the Indonesian invasion of East Timor on 7 December, Lobato and Alkatiri stayed in Africa to campaign for the rights of their home country.

On 31 January 2024, Rogério was sworn in as the new president of Special Administrative Region of Oecusse by President Ramos-Horta.
