= Escola Industrial e Comercial Prof. Silva Cunha =

The school's building in 2018, now part of the Universidade Nacional Timor Lorosa'e campus.

The Escola Industrial e Comercial Professor Silva Cunha, originally named the Escola Técnica Elementar Professor Silva Cunha, was a vocational school in Dili, Portuguese Timor (present-day Timor-Leste). Established by law on 4 September 1965, it was named for Joaquim da Silva Cunha, Portugal's minister of overseas territories. The school began operating in October 1966 in temporary accommodation before moving into a modern, purpose-built building in 1967. The campus was built in phases between 1966 and 1971, with the final building consisting of a two two-story blocks. Located on Rua Formosa, the school building faces the back of the Government Palace, now also home to the National Parliament of Timor-Leste.

The Escola Industrial e Comercial was the first technical school in Portuguese Timor and was among only a handful of secondary educational institutions in the colony, along with the Liceu Dr. Francisco Machado and the Escola Engenheiro Canto Resende. In 1969, the school had an enrollment of 333 pupils. Until the early 1970s, the majority of students were Portuguese, mestiço, Goan, or Chinese. The Escola Industrial e Comercial served both pre-secondary and secondary students, offering a two-year preparatory program followed by vocational courses. Vocational courses offered included general commerce, business administration, and civil engineering.

Student demonstrators in front of the school building during the 2025 Timor-Leste protests.

When the Universidade Nacional Timor Lorosa'e (UNTL) was formed in 2000, the Escola Industrial e Comercial building became part of the university campus, along with the Liceu Dr. Francisco Machado and other nearby educational buildings. Located across the street from Timor-Leste's National Parliament, the building has been the site of several student-led demonstrations, including in 2022 and in 2025.

== Notable people ==
=== Staff ===
- Sérgio Lobo (born 1958), worked as a pre-secondary teacher in 1975

=== Alumni ===
- Joel da Costa Alves (1950–1978), revolutionary, attended until 1969
- Lourdes Alves Araújo (1956–2021), revolutionary and politician, attended for four years
- Maria José Brites Boavida (1961–1978), women's rights and independence activist, attended until 1975
- Rosa "Muki" Bonaparte (1957–1975), women's rights and independence activist, attended 1969–1973
- Ilda Conceição (born 1957), revolutionary and politician, attended 1973–1975
- Virgílio Maria Dias Marçal (1954–2024), politician, attended from 1968
- Silvino Adolfo Morais (1956–2022), politician, attended 1969–1975
- Guilhermina Ribeiro (born 1959), independence activist and civil servant, attended from 1972
- Calisto dos Santos (born 1959), military officer, attended from 1971
- Domingas Álves da Silva (born 1964), revolutionary and politician
- Estanislau da Silva (born 1952), politician and prime minister of Timor-Leste in May–August 2007, attended 1966–1971
- Januário Soares, politician and civil servant, attended 1972–1974
- Sebastião Dias Ximenes (born 1958), lawyer and politician, attended 1971–1974

== See also ==
- List of secondary schools in Timor-Leste
