= Lee Chiong Giam =

Singaporean diplomat and civil servant (died 2021)

Lee Chiong Giam (1941/2 – 10 March 2021) was a Singaporean diplomat and civil servant. Lee was part of the country's first generation of diplomats following independence in 1965. He served as the High Commissioner to Papua New Guinea from 1982 to 1999, High Commissioner to Fiji from 1997 to 2005, High Commissioner to Pakistan from 2006 to 2014, and Ambassador to East Timor from 2005 to 2014. Domestically, Lee was the longest-serving executive director of the People's Association (PA) from 1982 until 1999.

Lee attended Victoria School. He received his bachelor's degree in pharmacy in 1965. He worked at the Ministry of Health beginning in 1967, before being transferred to the Ministry of Foreign Affairs in 1969. Lee was appointed charge d'affaires at the Singaporean embassy in Cambodia from 1970 to 1973 during the Cambodian Civil War. He suffered minor injuries when a bomb exploded near the embassy in Phnom Penh.

He was promoted as Director of the regional and economic offices at Ministry of Foreign Affairs from 1975 to 1982.

In 1990, Lee was part of the delegation sent to the People's Republic of China to establish official diplomatic relations with the PRC.

According to Singaporean diplomat Tommy Koh, Lee was a supporter of East Timor and its development during the years following independence in 2002. Koh told the Straits Times, "He [Lee] admired that they had fought for independence. He felt they were brave people who had been hard done by some acts of injustice - and that Singapore should help them, not impede their progress." Lee served as Singapore's Ambassador from 2005 to 2014. In 2012, East Timorese President Jose Ramos-Horta awarded Lee the Order of Timor-Leste, the country's highest honor.

In 1982, Prime Minister Lee Kuan Yew appointed Lee as executive director of the People's Association (PA), a position he held from 1982 until 1999. He was awarded the gold Pingat Pentadbiran Awam (Public Administration Medal) in 1999 when he stepped down from the position. Lee Chiong Giam also received the Bintang Bakti Masyarakat (Public Service Star) in 2012.

Lee stepped down as deputy secretary of the MFA in 2011 and retired from the Ministry of Foreign Affairs (MFA) in 2014, but remained active in civil and international affairs. He later served on the boards of directors for Creative Malay Arts and Culture and the Puan Noor Aishah Intercultural Institute.

== Personal life ==
Lee was married to Geok Lan and had three children.

In February 2021, Lee fell and hit his head at a gas station in Singapore. He spent two weeks in a coma, but died from complications of the fall on 10 March 2021, at the age of 79.
