= Timor-Leste Solidarity Medal =

Timor-Leste Solidarity Medal Medalha Solidariedade de Timor-Leste
- Ribbon bar of the medal
- Awarded for: Service in stability and peace operations in Timor-Leste from 11 June 1999
- Country: Timor-Leste
- Presented by: the President of Timor-Leste
- Eligibility: International security forces who served on a mandated mission to assist with Peace and Stability operations in Timor-Leste
- Campaigns: INTERFET; 2006 East Timorese crisis
- Established: 2 February 2009

Precedence
- Next (higher): Medal of Merit
- Next (lower): Halibur Medal

The Timor-Leste Solidarity Medal (Portuguese: Medalha Solidariedade de Timor-Leste) is a state decoration of Timor-Leste awarded to international security forces for their contribution to stability and peace operations in East Timor during the INTERFET operation, and following the 2006 East Timorese crisis.

== Criteria ==
Personnel may be awarded the medal if they meet personnel and time qualifications. Personnel eligible are military or police personnel who have served on a mandated mission assisting with peace and stability operations. Military or Police personnel may also be eligible if they were posted to a recognised bilateral support mission to Timor-Leste.

Personnel must have served a minimum of 30 days in Timor-Leste from 11 June 1999. The President of Timor-Leste in 2026 expanded the eligibility criteria from 2006 to 1999.

== Appearance ==
The medal is circular and silver in colour, 38 mm in diameter, with a raise rim. The obverse depict the map of the country in relief. It is inscribed TIMOR-LESTE above and SOLIDARIEDADE below. The reverse bears the Coat of Arms of Timor-Leste with the inscription of REPUBLICA DEMOCRATICA DE TIMOR-LESTE arching above and the letters RDTL below. The medal is suspended from a ribbon of black, white, yellow, and red. These colors are the same as the country's flag. The medal is manufactured by Cash's International of Melbourne, Australia.

== See also ==
- Orders, decorations, and medals of Timor-Leste
- New Zealand General Service Medal 2002 (Timor-Leste)
- United Nations Medal for the United Nations Integrated Mission in Timor-Leste (UNMIT)
- International Force East Timor Medal
