= List of secondary schools in Timor-Leste =

This is a list of secondary schools in Timor-Leste, sorted by municipality.

== Aileu ==
- Colégio São Pedro e São Paulo
- Escola CAFE de Aileu
- Escola Secundária Católica de São José Operário
- Escola Secundária Geral Católica Nossa Senhora do Carmo
- Escola Secundária Geral Dom Tomás
- Ensino Secundário Geral Privado Cristal Filial de Aileu
- Escola Secundária Geral Pública No. 1 Laulara
- Escola Secundária Técnica-Vocacional Aileu

== Ainaro ==
- Escola CAFE de Ainaro
- Escola Secundária Geral Católica Nain Feto Ramelau
- Escola Secundária Geral Católica Nossa Senhora de Lourdes
- Escola Secundária Geral Católica Santo Inácio de Loyola
- Escola Secundária Geral Fernando Lasama
- Escola Secundária Técnica-Vocacional Dare Boetua
- Escola Secundária Técnica-Vocacional Gil da Costa Monteiro "Oan Soru"
- Escola Secundária Técnica-Vocacional Hatu-Udo
- Escola Secundária Técnica-Vocacional Horaiquic
- Escola Secundária Técnica-Vocacional Maulau
- Escola Secundária Técnica-Vocacional Tas-Topa

== Atauro ==
- Escola Secundária Geral 99
- Escola Secundária Técnica-Vocacional de Pesca

== Baucau ==
- Colégio Sagrado Coração de Jesus
- Don Bosco Technical High School
- Escola CAFE de Baucau
- Escola Secundária Geral Baguia
- Escola Secundária Geral Católica Pe. João de Deus Pires, SDB
- Escola Secundária Geral Filial Daraloi
- Escola Secundária Geral Filial Dom Carlos Filipe Ximenes Belo
- Escola Secundária Geral Filial Laisorulai
- Escola Secundária Geral Filial Seiçal
- Escola Secundária Geral Filial Vemasse
- Escola Secundária Geral Filial Quelicai
- Escola Secundária Geral Filial Ualili
- Escola Secundária Geral Laga
- Escola Secundária Geral No. 1 Baucau
- Escola Secundária Geral No. 2 Baucau
- Escola Secundária Geral Paralelo Aubaca
- Escola Secundária Geral Taur Matan Ruak
- Escola Secundária Geral Venilale
- Escola Secundária Santo António
- Escola Secundária São João Bosco de Laga
- Escola Secundária Técnica-Vocacional Baucau
- Escola Secundária Técnica-Vocacional Mau-Buti
- Escola Técnica Informática de Baucau
- St. Maria Mazzarello Vocational School

== Bobonaro ==
- Colégio Infante de Sagres
- Colégio do Verbo Divino – Palaca
- Ensino Secundário Geral Privado Cristal
- Escola CAFE de Bobonaro
- Escola Secundária Geral Balibo
- Escola Secundária Geral Católica Santo Agostinho
- Escola Secundária Geral Católica São Miguel
- Escola Secundária Geral Dom Martinho da Costa Lopes
- Escola Secundária Técnica-Vocacional Agricultura Maliana
- Escola Secundária Técnica-Vocacional Atabae
- Escola Secundária Técnica-Vocacional Bobonaro
- Escola Secundária Técnica-Vocacional Cailaco
- Escola Secundária Técnica-Vocacional Cavalaria
- Escola Secundária Técnica-Vocacional Dom Bosco Maumali
- Escola Secundária Técnica-Vocacional Malibaca Yamato
- Escola Secundária Técnica-Vocacional No. 3 Bobonaro
- Escola Técnica Informática de Maliana
- St. Joseph Minor Seminary

== Cova Lima ==
- Escola CAFE de Cova Lima
- Escola Secundária Católica Ave Maria
- Escola Secundária Geral Pública de Suai
- Escola Secundária Técnica-Vocacional Akar-Laran
- Escola Secundária Técnica-Vocacional Claret
- Escola Secundária Técnica-Vocacional Cristal
- Escola Secundária Técnica-Vocacional Nutetu Fohorem
- Escola Secundária Técnica-Vocacional Zumalai

== Dili ==
- 28 de Novembro Secondary School
- Colégio Paulo VI
- Colégio de São Francisco Xavier
- Colégio de São José Operário
- Colégio São Miguel Arcanjo
- Dili International School
- Escola Amigos de Jesus
- Escola CAFE de Díli
- Escola Católica do Sagrado Coração de Jesus
- Escola Dominicana
- Escola Paroquial de São Pedro
- Escola Portuguesa de Díli
- Escola Secundária Geral 4 de Setembro UNAMET
- Escola Secundária Geral 5 de Maio
- Escola Secundária Geral 10 de Dezembro
- Escola Secundária Geral 12 de Novembro
- Escola Secundária Geral 20 de Setembro
- Escola Secundária Geral An-Nur
- Escola Secundária Geral Cristal
- Escola Secundária Geral Fitun Naroman Timor Lorosa'e
- Escola Secundária Geral Herois da Pátria
- Escola Secundária Geral Nicolau Lobato
- Escola Secundária Geral Nobel da Paz
- Escola Secundária Geral Rainha da Paz
- Escola Secundária Santa Madalena de Canossa
- Escola Secundária Técnica-Vocacional – Escola Economia e Comércio
- Escola Secundária Técnica-Vocacional – Grupo de Tecnologia e Indústria
- Escola Secundária Técnica-Vocacional Hera
- Escola Secundária Técnica-Vocacional de Hotelaria e Turismo Becora
- Escola Técnica Informática de Díli
- Externato de São José
- Heritage International School
- Our Lady of Fatima Minor Seminary
- QSI International School of Dili
- St. Anthony's International School
- St. Jude Thaddeus International School
- St. Mary's International School
- St Paul Methodist School
- Tais International School

Defunct

- Escola Industrial e Comercial Prof. Silva Cunha
- Liceu Dr. Francisco Machado

== Ermera ==
- Colegio Imaculada Conceição
- Colégio de São Francisco Xavier
- Escola CAFE de Ermera
- Escola Secundária Católica Nossa Senhora de Fátima
- Escola Secundária Católica Nossa Senhora do Carmo
- Escola Secundária Geral Hélio Sanches Pina Mau-Kruma
- Escola Secundária Geral Cesar Maulaca
- Escola Secundária Geral Nino Konis Santana
- Escola Secundária Técnica-Vocacional Cabo Martinho Guissarudo
- Escola Secundária Técnica-Vocacional Católica Mater Misericordiae
- Escola Secundária Técnica-Vocacional Colégio Apostolo Paulo Reman-Bote
- Escola Secundária Técnica-Vocacional Dr. José Ramos-Horta
- Escola Secundária Técnica-Vocacional Ernesto Fernandes "Dudu"
- Escola Secundária Técnica-Vocacional Kay Rala Xanana Gusmão
- Escola Secundária Técnica-Vocacional Raicala
- Escola Secundária Técnica-Vocacional Railaco

== Lautém ==
- Escola CAFE de Lautém
- Escola Secundária Geral Fernando Lasama
- Escola Secundária Geral Lere Anan Timur
- Escola Secundária Geral Nino Konis Santana
- Escola Secundária Geral No. 1 Lautem
- Escola Secundária Técnica-Vocacional Laico
- Escola Secundária Técnica-Vocacional No. 1 Lospalos
- Escola Secundária Técnica-Vocacional No. 2 Lospalos

== Liquiçá ==
- Colégio de Santo Inácio de Loiola
- Escola CAFE de Liquiçá
- Escola Secundária Católica São João de Brito
- Escola Secundária Geral Pública Hu Iso Lara Iso (also known as ESGP No. 1 Liquiçá)
- Escola Secundária Geral Pública Filial Maubara
- Escola Secundária Técnica-Vocacional Liquiçá
- Escola Secundária Técnica-Vocacional Nicolau dos Reis Lobato
- Immaculate Heart of Mary School

== Manatuto ==
- Escola CAFE de Manatuto
- Escola Católica Santo António de Manatuto
- Escola Secundária Católica Dom Basílio do Nascimento
- Escola Secundária Católica São Francisco de Assis
- Escola Secundária Geral Católica São João Paulo II
- Escola Secundária Geral Kay Rala
- Escola Secundária Geral Primeira Dama Kirsty Sword Gusmão
- Escola Secundária Técnica-Vocacional Mahunu Bukar
- Escola Secundária Técnica-Vocacional Natarbora
- Escola Secundária Técnica-Vocacional Presidente Nicolau Lobato

== Manufahi ==
- Colégio São Francisco de Assis
- Colégio São Miguel Arcanjo
- Ensino Secundário Católico Nossa Senhora de Fatima
- Escola CAFE de Manufahi
- Escola Secundária Católica Santo António de Lisboa
- Escola Secundária Geral 1912
- Escola Secundária Geral Cristal Dom Bosco Same
- Escola Secundária Técnica-Vocacional Acadiruhun
- Escola Secundária Técnica-Vocacional Combatentes e Veteranos
- Escola Secundária Técnica-Vocacional Agricultura Dotik
- Escola Secundária Técnica-Vocacional Francisco Borja da Costa
- Escola Secundária Técnica-Vocacional Halibur Betano

== Oecusse ==
- Colégio de Santo António
- Escola CAFE de Oecusse
- Escola Secundária Geral Baqui
- Escola Secundária Geral Pública Palaban
- Escola Secundária Técnica-Vocacional Palaban
- Escola Secundária Técnica-Vocacional – Tecnologia e Indústria Lifau

== Viqueque ==
- Colégio Santo António de Lacluta
- Ensino Secundário Geral Católico de Santo Estêvão
- Escola CAFE de Viqueque
- Escola Secundária Geral 4 de Setembro
- Escola Secundária Geral Caixa
- Escola Secundária Geral Olocassa
- Escola Secundária Geral Sabika Besi Kulit
- Escola Secundária Geral Uatucarbau
- Escola Secundária Santa Madalena de Canossa
- Escola Secundária Técnica-Vocacional Kalo-Heda
- Escola Secundária Técnica-Vocacional Ravina Lacluta

== See also ==
- Education in Timor-Leste
- Lists of schools
