= Cirilo Cristóvão =

East Timorese politician

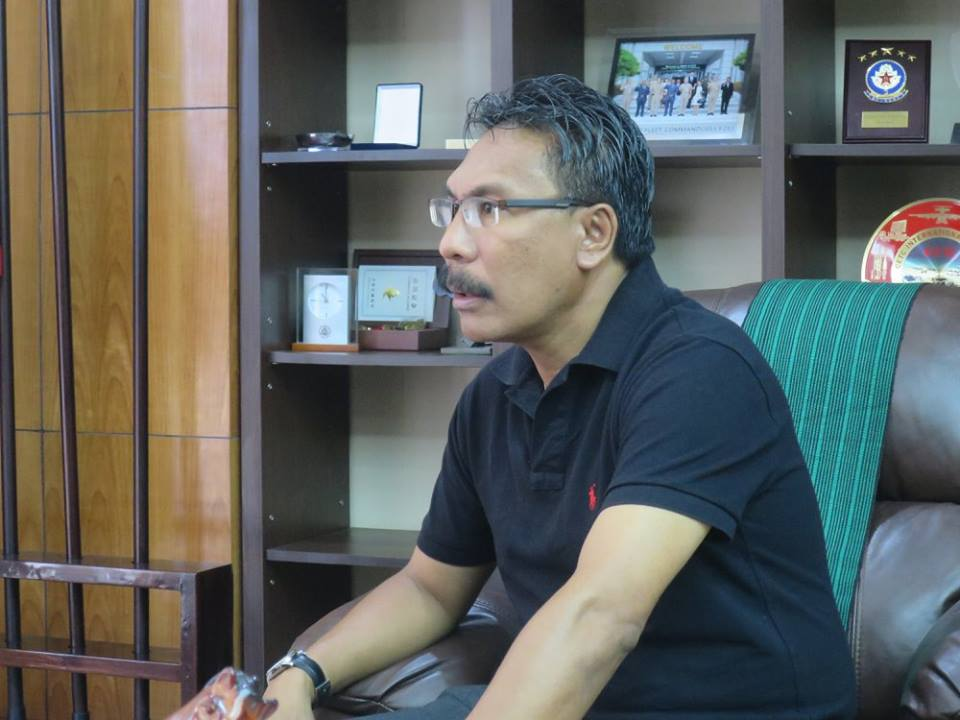
- Cirilo Cristóvão in 2017

6th Minister of Defense
- In office 16 February 2015 – 3 October 2017
- President: Taur Matan Ruak; Francisco Guterres
- Prime Minister: Rui Maria de Araújo
- Preceded by: Xanana Gusmão
- Succeeded by: José Agostinho Sequeira

Personal details
- Born: Cirilo José Jacob Valadares Cristóvão; 20 March 1966 Fuiloro, Portuguese Timor
- Died: 20 October 2019 (aged 53) Denpasar, Bali, Indonesia
- Party: National Congress for Timorese Reconstruction
- Occupation: Politician

Cirilo José Jacob Valadares Cristóvão (20 March 1966 – 20 October 2019) was a politician from East Timor who was formerly the Minister of Defense from 2015 to 2017.

== Biography ==
=== Education and early career ===
Cristóvo graduated with a bachelor's degree in civil law from Bali, Indonesia's Udayana University.

Cristóvo served as the head of the legal division of the district administration of his home town of Lautém from 1993 to 1994 while working in the Indonesian civil service. Later, he was in charge of the planning division. Later he served as a judge in the Dili District Court from 2000 until 2003. He took many courses concurrently on judicial training, international law, domestic violence law, and human rights. He served as a member of the Conselho Superior da Magistratura Judicial (CSMJ) from 2002 until his death in October 2019.

=== Political career ===
Cristóvo was on the boards of directors for Timor Aid and the Peace and Democracy Foundation from 2003 to 2004. He served as one of the co-chairs of the Indonesian-East Timorese Truth and Friendship Commission from 2005 to 2008, which had the responsibility of looking into the atrocities committed during the 1999 East Timorese crisis. The South African Truth and Reconciliation Commission served as a model. He served as a Council of State member from 27 August 2007 to 10 October 2012, after being chosen by the National Parliament. From 2008 to 2009, he was Chief Legal Adviser to Deputy Prime Minister José Luís Guterres before being appointed first Director General of the National Intelligence Service by Prime Minister Xanana Gusmão in October 2009. he held the office until 2015.

After Prime Minister Gusmao failed to win his first election, Maria Domingas Alves, from President Taur Matan Ruak, Cristóvo was to be appointed defense minister in 2012. Prime Minister Gusmao eventually assumed control of the Ministry of Defense personally after several months of uncertainty. He was officially sworn in as the Minister of Defense by Prime Minister Rui Maria de Araujo on 16 February 2015. He was the first person since 2006 to hold the position on his own. The ministry has always been under the control of the prime minister since the riots in East Timor in 2006.

=== Death ===
On 20 October 2019, Cristóvo died away in the Bali Royal Hospital (BROS) in Bali.

Political offices
Preceded by Xanana Gusmão	6th Minister of Defense; 16 February 2015 – 3 October 2017	Succeeded by José Agostinho Sequeira
