= José Agostinho Sequeira =

East Timorese politician and former guerilla

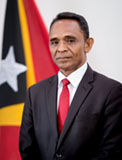

Member of the National Parliament
- Incumbent
- Assumed office 13 June 2018

Minister for Defence and Security
- In office 15 September 2017 – 22 June 2018
- Prime Minister: Mari Alkatiri
- Preceded by: Cirilo Cristóvão; (Minister of Defence); Longuinhos Monteiro; (Minister of the Interior)
- Succeeded by: Filomeno da Paixão de Jesus

Vice Minister for Interior
- In office 21 July 2006 – 8 August 2007
- Prime Minister: José Ramos-Horta; (to 19 May 2007); Estanislau da Silva; (from 19 May 2007)
- Preceded by: Alcino Baris
- Succeeded by: Office abolished

Personal details
- Born: 7 June 1959 (age 67) Lore I, Lautém; Portuguese Timor (now East Timor)
- Party: Fretilin

José Agostinho Sequeira (born 7 June 1959), also known by his nom de guerre Somotxo Matar Mimiraka, is an East Timorese politician and former guerilla, and a member of the Fretilin political party. In 2006–2007, he was Vice Minister of Interior, and in 2017–2018 he was Minister for Defence and Security. Since 2018, he has been a Member of the National Parliament.

== Early life and career ==
Sequeira was born in Lore I, in the then Lautém District of the then Portuguese Timor. He attended school for twelve years. During the liberation struggle against Indonesia, he was a collaborator of the chief of staff of Falintil and Secretary of Region IV.

After the resumption of Timorese independence in 2002, Sequeira was appointed as the first director of the Timorese Resistance Archive and Museum (Portuguese: Arquivo & Museu da Resistência Timorense, Tetum: Arkivu & Museu Rezisténsia Timorense (AMRT)). From August 2002, he worked in Lisbon with the then Mário Soares Foundation (Portuguese: Fundação Mário Soares (FMS)) to build the archive. Following his return to East Timor in May 2006, he continued to work at the AMRT until 21 July 2006, when he was sworn in as Vice Minister of Interior in the II Constitutional Government.

== Political career ==
Sequeira remained in office as Vice Minister, including in the III Constitutional Government, until 8 August 2007, when that government was replaced by the IV Constitutional Government. He later became president of the Falantil Veterans Foundation (Portuguese: Fundação dos Veteranos das Falintil (FVF)).

From 2012 to 2017, Sequeira was one of the five members of the Council of State elected by the Parliament.

In the East Timorese parliamentary election of 2017, Sequeira was elected to the National Parliament as a member of the Fretilin list. On 15 September 2017, he was sworn in as Minister of Defence and Security in the VII Constitutional Government, and therefore had to give up his parliamentary seat in accordance with the Constitution. As Defence Minister, Sequeira was also a member of the Superior Council for Defence and Security. When it became clear that the Fretilin / PD minority government could not prevail in Parliament, President Francisco Guterres dissolved the Parliament and called new elections.

In the ensuing election held on 12 May 2018, Sequeira was re-elected as number 20 on the Fretilin list, and Fretilin became the strongest opposition party. Sequeira's term as Minister ended when the VIII Constitutional Government took office on 22 June 2018. He is now a member of the Parliamentary Committee on Foreign Affairs, Defence and Security (Committee B).

== Honours ==
| Ribbon | Award | Date awarded | Notes |
|---|---|---|---|
| | Order of the Guerilla, Degree 1 | | |
| | Medal of the Order of Timor-Leste | 20 May 2019 | |
