= Ilda Conceição =

East Timorese politician (born 1957)

Ilda Maria da Conceição
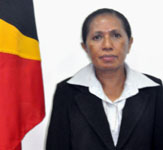

Member, Commission for Health, Education and Culture
- In office 30 July 2007 – 2018

Vice-Minister of Primary and Secondary Education
- In office 10 July 2006 – 8 August 2007

Vice-Minister of State Administration
- In office 6 March 2003 – July 2005

Vice-Minister of International Administration
- In office 20 May 2002 – 4 March 2003

Personal details
- Born: 23 November 1957 (age 68) Uatucarbau, Portuguese Timor
- Party: FRETILIN

Ilda Maria da Conceição (born 23 November 1957), whose resistance names were Lalo Imin (independence or death, never integration) and Wairaha Gae Imin (a big star that rises before the sun in the morning), is a politician from East Timor. She is a member of the FRETILIN party.

== Personal life ==
Conceição was born in Uatucarbau, Portuguese Timor, the daughter of Beatriz Araújo and Agustinho da Costa Pinto. She spent much of her childhood in Uatucarbau, Viqueque. As a daughter of a nobleman, she had access to a privileged education. From 1966 to 1971, she attended primary school at Oscar Ruas College in Ossu, and from 1971 to 1972 went to a pre-secondary school in Dili. Finally, from 1973 to 1975 she took a business administration course at the Escola Industrial e Comercial Prof. Silva Cunha in Dili. In 1977, she married Reinaldo Freitas Belo (Kilik Wae Ga'e). He died in 1984 under unspecified circumstances, after he had led an unsuccessful overthrow attempt against the FALINTIL commander Xanana Gusmão. It is uncertain whether he was killed by FALINTIL members or by Indonesian forces. The marriage produced a daughter and a son. In her second marriage to Manuel Leão Gaio (Gelson Black), she had another daughter and son. Conceição speaks the Portuguese, Tetum, Naueti and Makasae languages fluently.

== Career ==
In 1975, Conceição joined the newly established Organização Popular de Mulheres Timorense (Popular Organisation of East Timorese Women) (OPMT), the women's organization of FRETILIN. At the time of the Indonesian invasion of East Timor in December 1975, she fled to the mountains. Here Conceição began teaching women who did not have the opportunity to study. This included reading and writing as well as sewing and embroidery. Conceição became leader of OPMT in Suco Bahatata, a village in the Uatucarbau Subdistrict. From 1976 to 1986 Lalo Imin, as she was called at that time, took part in the guerrilla struggle against the occupiers. In 1976 she was appointed Assistant to Zone 1912 in Baguia, and from 1977 to 1978 she was a commissariat delegate for the Eastern sector. Her husband Kilik Wai Gae was at the time commander of the Second Sector. In 1978 Conceição, with Xanana Gusmão, was a member of the group that built the resistance network in Lospalos.

In 1981, Conceição was made a commando assistant. She changed her resistance name to Wairaha Gae Imin for safety reasons. In 1984, her husband was killed, and she herself was captured by the Indonesian army and taken to a town. Although under surveillance, she joined the inner-city resistance network, and was re-arrested in 1986 in Ossu. She was imprisoned in Baucau for two years. After her release, her freedom of movement was limited and she was suspected of being a member of the "movement of order disturbances" (GPK). In fact, Conceição remained active in the resistance and disguised this by volunteering for the church, as she delivered religious education in the Viqueque parish. Her family's experiences are well-known in East Timor, and her story featured in the film The Uprise of the mauberes (Tetum: Maubere oan sira hamrik ba; Portuguese: O levante dos mauberes).

Under the United Nations Transitional Administration in East Timor, Conceição was appointed deputy district administrator for Viqueque. She held the office from November 2000 to September 2001. From 2001 to 2006 she was elected representative for the Viqueque district in the Central Committee of FRETILIN.

In the first National Parliament of East Timor, sworn in on 20 May 2002, Conceição was Vice Minister of International Administration. Dismissed from that role on 4 March 2003, on 6 March 2003, she was sworn in as Vice-Minister of State Administration, and held that office until mid 2005. From 10 July 2006 to 8 August 2007, she was Vice Minister of Primary and Secondary Education. At the second National Congress of FRETILIN 2006, she was elected to the judicial commission of FRETILIN, to which she belonged until 2011, including a term as vice-president.

Conceição was elected to the National Parliament at the 2007 East Timorese parliamentary election, and took office on the 30 July 2007. She became a member of the Commission for Health, Education and Culture (Commission F), which was also responsible for veterans and gender equality from 2012. In the parliamentary elections in East Timor in 2017, Conceição ran for FRETILIN on position 5 of the ballot and again returned to the national parliament. She was again a member of the Commission for Health, Education, Culture, Veterans and Gender Equality (Commission F) and substitute delegate of the national group of the National Parliament at the Parliamentary Assembly of the Community of Portuguese Language Countries (CPLP).

In the parliamentary elections in 2018 Conceição was in position 35 on the ballot, and was unsuccessful at the election.

== Awards ==
On November 28, 2006, Conceição received from the government the Nicolau Lobato Order for her extraordinary participation and contribution to the liberation of East Timor.
