= Bendito Freitas =

East Timorese politician

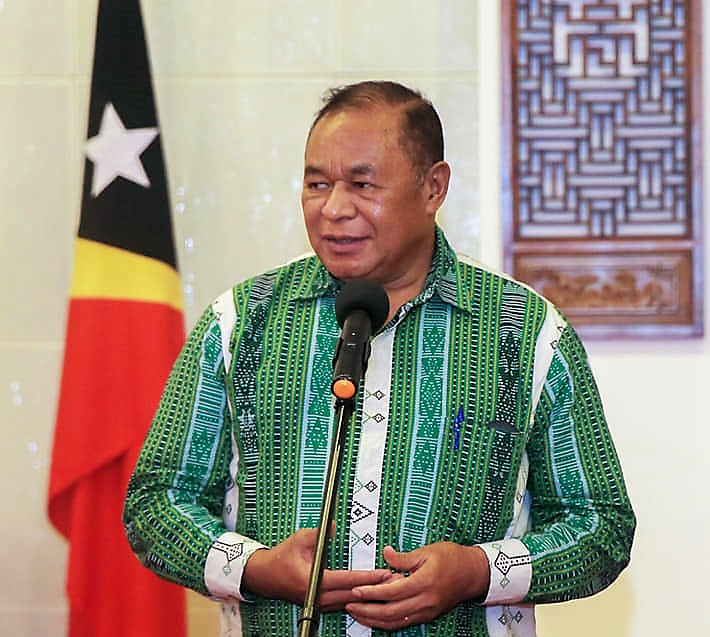
- Freitas in 2023

Minister of Foreign Affairs and Cooperation
- Incumbent
- Assumed office 1 July 2023
- Prime Minister: Xanana Gusmão
- Preceded by: Adaljíza Albertina Xavier Reis Magno

Minister of Education
- In office 8 August 2012 – 16 February 2015
- Prime Minister: Xanana Gusmão
- Preceded by: João Câncio Freitas
- Succeeded by: Fernando La Sama de Araújo

Secretary of State for Professional Training and Employment
- In office 8 August 2007 – 8 August 2012
- Prime Minister: Xanana Gusmão
- Preceded by: Office established
- Succeeded by: Ilídio Ximenes da Costa; (as Secretary of State for Professional Training and Employment Policy)

Personal details
- Born: Bendito Freitas
- Party: National Congress for Timorese Reconstruction (CNRT)

Bendito dos Santos Freitas is an East Timorese politician and a member of the National Congress for Timorese Reconstruction (Portuguese: Congresso Nacional de Reconstrução de Timor, CNRT).

He is the incumbent Minister of Foreign Affairs and Cooperation, serving since July 2023 in the IX Constitutional Government of Timor-Leste led by Prime Minister Xanana Gusmão.
