= Ministry of Defense (Timor-Leste) =

Ministry in the government of Timor-Leste

- Ministério da Defesa (Portuguese); Ministériu Defeza (Tetum)
- Coat of Arms of Timor-Leste

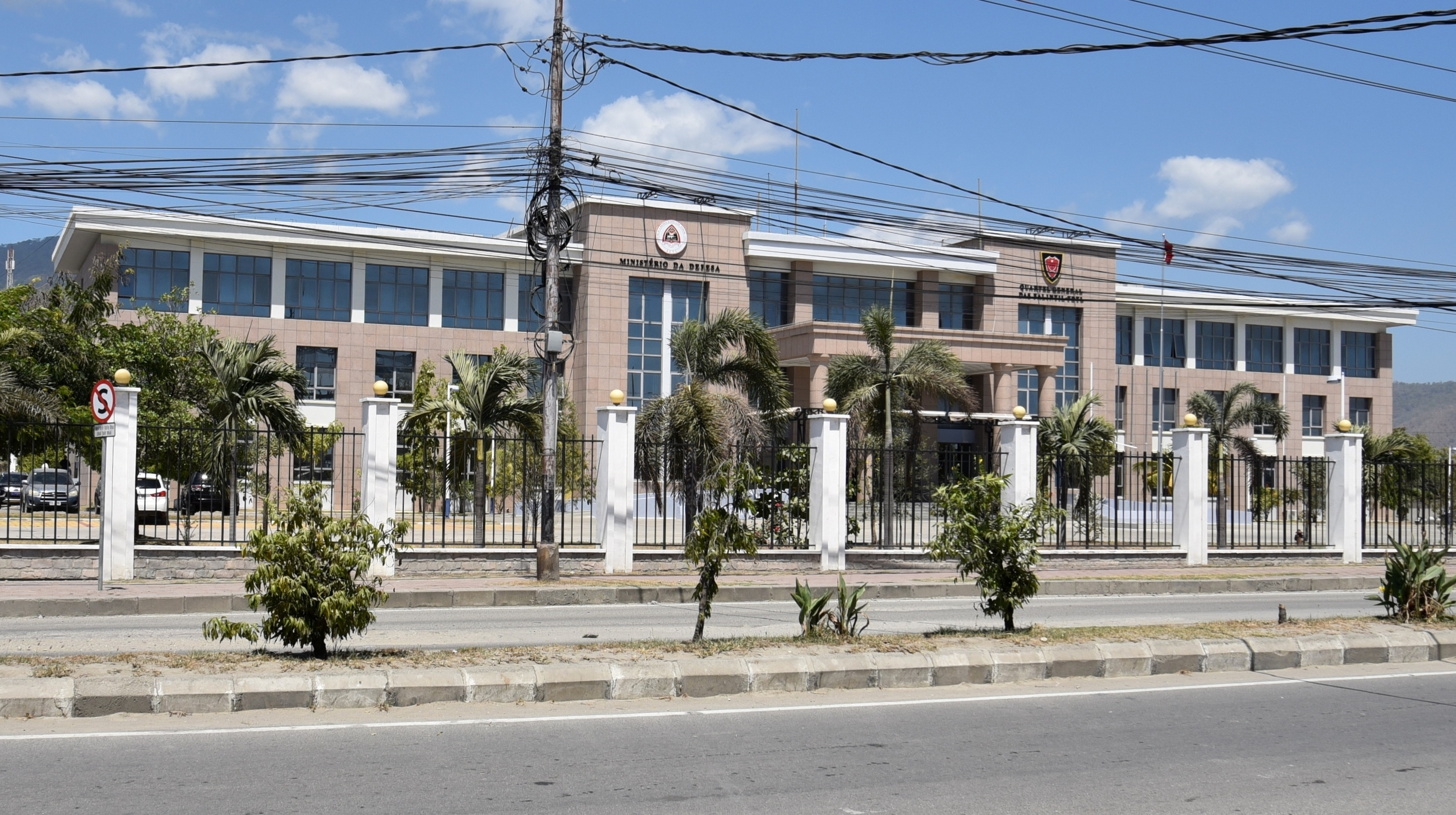
- Headquarters of the Ministry

Ministry overview
- Formed: 1975 / 2005
- Jurisdiction: Government of Timor-Leste
- Headquarters: Avenida Presidente Nicolau Lobato, Bairro Pite, Dili; 8°33′17″S 125°33′12″E
- Minister responsible: Pedro Klamar Fuik, Minister of Defense
- Website: Ministry of Defense
- Agency ID: MD

The Ministry of Defense (MD; Portuguese: Ministério da Defesa, Tetum: Ministériu Defeza) is the government department of Timor-Leste accountable for the defence of the country and related matters.

== Functions ==
The Ministry is responsible for the design, implementation, coordination and evaluation of policy for the areas of national defense and military cooperation.

== Minister ==
The incumbent Minister of Defense is Pedro Klamar Fuik.

== Headquarters ==
The Ministry's headquarters are on Avenida Presidente Nicolau Lobato, Bairro Pite, Dili. Designed, built and furnished by the government of China with almost no involvement by Timorese workers or suppliers, they were constructed between 2010 and 2012, at a cost of US$9 million.

== See also ==
- Politics of Timor-Leste
