= Orders, decorations, and medals of Timor-Leste =

The system of orders, decorations, and medals of Timor-Leste (formerly East Timor) was initially established with the passage of The Statute of the National Liberation Combatants in 2006. Under Article 26 of this statute was established a system to recognize the contributions of those who actively participated in the liberation of Timor-Leste. In March 2009, additional medals were established to honor those who, "have served the nation of East Timor by reinforcing the social order and whose actions have contributed significantly to national peace and stability." Finally, in May 2009, the Order of Timor-Leste was established as the highest currently awarded distinction of Timor-Leste.

In June 2011, a system of public safety medals was established for the National Police of Timor-Leste. In December 2015, an Order of Merit of Public Service was established with both individual and institutional categories.

== List ==
| Award | Ribbon | Description |
|---|---|---|
| Order of Timor-Leste; Ordem de Timor-Leste | | For significant contributions to Timor-Leste, the Timorese people, or mankind. |
| Medal of Merit; Medalha de Mérito | | For significant contributions to national peace and stability. |
| Timor-Leste Solidarity Medal; Medalha Solidariedade de Timor-Leste | | For foreign military and police personnel who served in the peacekeeping missions in East Timor during the INTERFET mission (20 September 1999 to 28 February 2000) and after 1 May 2006. |
| Halibur Medal; Medalha Halibur | | For significant contributions by F-FDTL and PNTL personnel during Operation Halibur. |
| Order of the Guerrilla; Ordem da Guerrilha | | Awarded to veterans of the national liberation struggle who served eight or more years in military roles, and to combatants who served less than eight years who "performed functions as military personnel of the support bases". |
| Order of Nicolau Lobato; Ordem Nicolau Lobato | | Awarded to veterans of the national liberation struggle who served eight or more years in civilian roles, and to combatants who served less than eight years who "performed functions as civilian personnel of the support bases". |
| Order of Dom Boaventura; Ordem de Dom Boaventura | | Awarded to "founder combatants" of the national liberation movement who "promoted, organized, and led the resistance" between 15 August 1975 and 31 May 1976. |
| Funu Nain Order; Ordem Funu Nain | | Awarded posthumously to "martyrs of national liberation." |
| Laran Luak Order; Ordem Laran Luak | | Awarded to foreigners recognized as national liberation fighters. |
| Order of Falintil; Ordem das Falintil | | Awarded posthumously to guerrillas who died after 1 January 1979. |
| Lorico Asuwain Order; Ordem Lorico Asuwain | | Awarded to the survivors, missing, and deceased of the 1991 Santa Cruz massacre. |
| Order of Dom Martinho Lopes; Ordem Dom Martinho Lopes | | For priests and religious sisters "who served the people and the Timorese cause between 1975 and 1999." |
| Distinguished Service Medal; Medalha de Serviços Distintos | | For "extraordinary individual or collective acts" by PNTL members demonstrating courage, spirit of sacrifice, and dedication to public security. |
| Public Security Medal of Merit; Medalha de Mérito de Segurança Pública | | For PNTL members who exhibit exceptional qualities of character, loyalty, selflessness, obedience, sense of duty, and competence. |
| Exemplary Conduct Medal; Medalha de Comportamento Exemplar | | For PNTL members who exhibit "exemplary moral conduct and discipline" throughout their careers. |

== See also ==
- Category:Orders, decorations, and medals related to service in Timor-Leste
