= Ministry of Education, Youth and Sport (Timor-Leste) =

Ministry in the government of Timor-Leste

- Ministério da Educação, Juventude e Desporto (Portuguese); Ministériu Edukasaun, Juventude no Desportu (Tetum)
- Coat of Arms of Timor-Leste

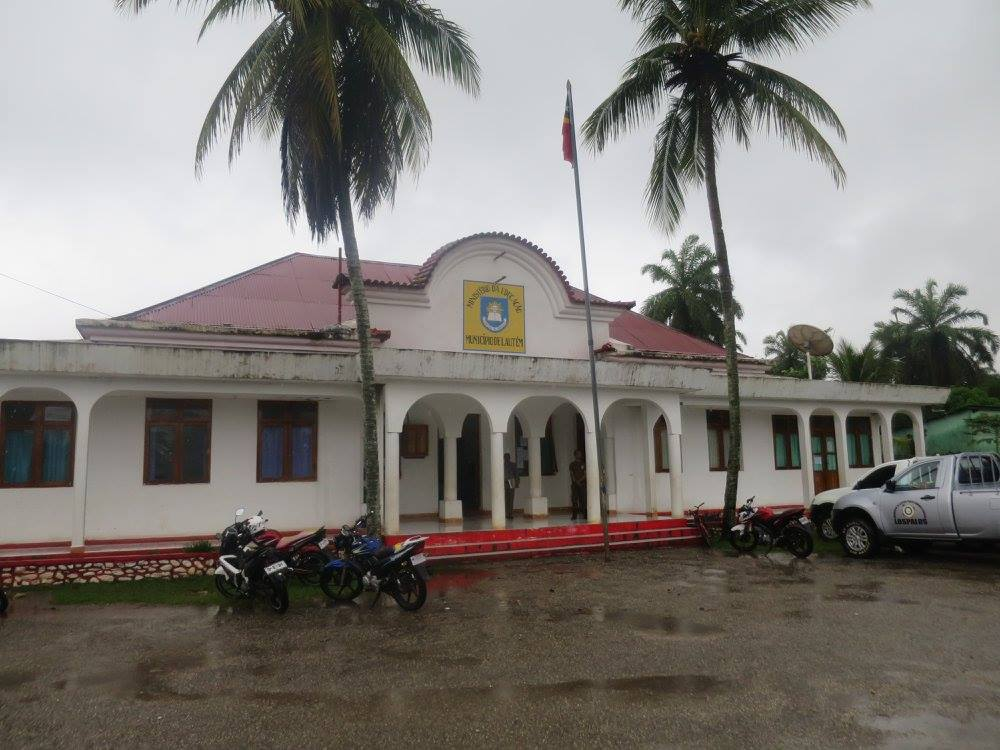
- Office of the Ministry, Lospalos

Ministry overview
- Formed: 2001
- Jurisdiction: Government of Timor-Leste
- Headquarters: Rua Tuana-Laran, Dili; 8°33′35″S 125°34′4″E
- Minister responsible: Armindo Maia, Minister of Education, Youth and Sport
- Deputy Ministers responsible: António Guterres, Deputy Minister of Education, Youth and Sport; Abrão Saldanha, Secretary of State for Youth and Sport
- Website: Ministry of Education, Youth and Sport
- Agency ID: MEJD
- Ministry logo

The Ministry of Education, Youth and Sport (MEJD; Portuguese: Ministério da Educação, Juventude e Desporto, Tetum: Ministériu Edukasaun, Juventude no Desportu) is the government department of Timor-Leste accountable for education (excluding higher education) and related matters.

== Functions ==
The Ministry is responsible for designing, implementation, coordination and evaluation of policy for the following areas:

- education and qualification of all levels of education (excluding higher education);
- consolidation and promotion of official languages;
- youth; and
- sport.

== Minister ==
The incumbent Minister of Education, Youth and Sport is Armindo Maia. He is assisted by António Guterres, Deputy Minister of Education, Youth and Sport, (Note: The Constitution of Timor-Leste provides, in sections 104 and 105, for the appointment of officials referred to in its English language version as "Deputy Ministers". In other English language publications, those officials are commonly referred to as "Vice Ministers", even though the word "Vice", in context, arguably has a different meaning in English from the word "Deputy". In this article, the constitutional expression "Deputy" is used.) and Abrão Saldanha, Secretary of State for Youth and Sport.

== See also ==
- List of education ministries
- List of sports ministries
- Politics of Timor-Leste
