= Rosária Corte-Real =

East Timorese politician

Rosária Maria Corte-Real (also Rosalia Maria Corte-Real) was the Minister of Education and Culture in East Timor from 2006 to 2007. She was also responsible for youth and sports. She is a member of FRETILIN.

== Education and career ==
Corte-Real grew up in Ainaro, where her father was chief of the village (Portuguese: Chefe de Suco) during the Portuguese Timor period. In 1965, Corte-Real completed primary school in Same (Manufahi). Between 1966 and 1970 she then attended secondary and technical training school the Escola de Professores do Posto Escolar (Post School Teachers' School) in Canto Rezende, Dili. Corte-Real was then principal of primary schools in Bobonaro (1970 to 1971), Bazartete (1971 to 1972), Hato-Udo (1973 to 1974), and Bidau, a suburb of Dili (1975), the year of the Indonesian invasion of East Timor.

From 1980 to 1981, Corte-Real participated in a teachers' training course in Dili, followed by further training to obtain a teaching license at the IKIP Sanata Dharma in Yogyakarta, Java from 1985 to 1989. In 1990, she became head of the Teachers' Section of the Department of Education and Culture, Dili. From 1997 to 1999, she earned a master's degree in public administration at Gajah Mada University in Yogyakarta.

Under the United Nations Transitional Administration in East Timor following the 1999 East Timorese independence referendum, Corte-Real was elected an MP for Ainaro District for the FRETILIN party in the transitional constituent assembly, on 30 August 2001. She was a member of the Thematic Committee I and the Systematisation and Harmonisation Committee, which contributed to the development of East Timor's Bill of Rights. When East Timor became independent in 2002, the assembly became the National Parliament of East Timor, and Corte-Real was elected secretary of the parliament.
In the government sworn in in July 2005, Corte-Real was appointed Vice Minister of Primary and Secondary Education, in order to provide support to the Minister of Education at a time of conflict between church and state. In the next government formed in 2006, Corte-Real became the Minister of Education and Culture, replacing Armindo Maia. She retained that office until the election in June 2007. Her successor as minister was João Câncio Freitas.
