= Ministry of Foreign Affairs and Cooperation (Timor-Leste) =

Ministry in the government of Timor-Leste

- Ministerio dos Negócios Estrangeiros e Cooperação (Portuguese); Ministeriu Negósius Estranjeirus no Kooperasaun (Tetum)
- Coat of Arms of Timor-Leste

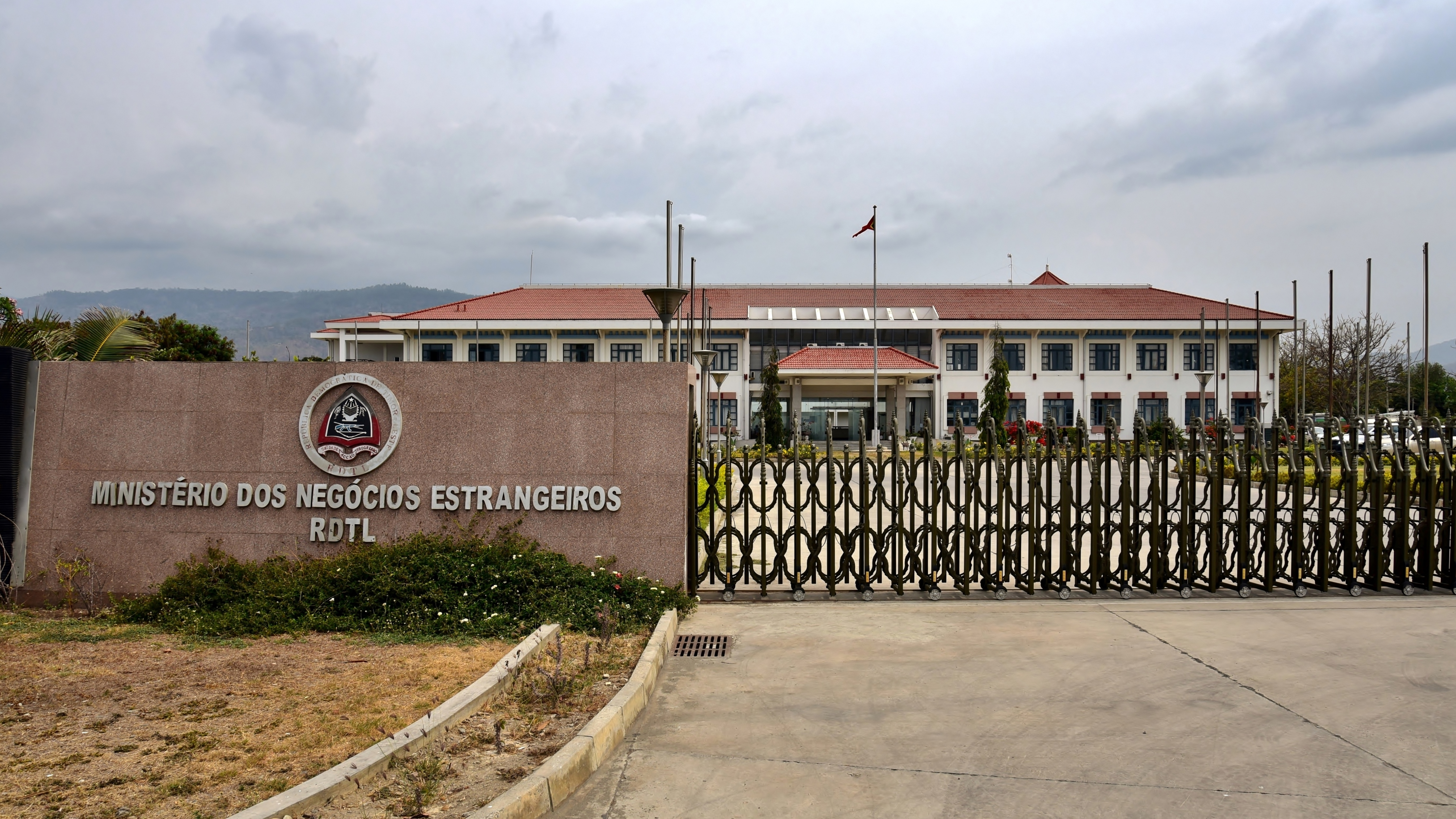
- Headquarters of the Ministry

Agency overview
- Formed: 1975 / 2002
- Jurisdiction: Government of Timor-Leste
- Headquarters: Avenida de Portugal, Dili; 8°32′53″S 125°33′22″E
- Minister responsible: Bendito Freitas, Minister of Foreign Affairs and Cooperation
- Website: Ministry of Foreign Affairs and Cooperation
- Agency ID: MFAC

The Ministry of Foreign Affairs and Cooperation (MFAC; Portuguese: Ministério dos Negócios Estrangeiros e Cooperação Timor-Leste, Tetum: Ministeriu Negosiu Estranjeiru no Kooperasaun) is the government department of Timor-Leste accountable for foreign affairs.

== Functions ==
The Ministry is responsible for the design, implementation, coordination and evaluation of policy for the following areas:

- foreign policy and international cooperation; and
- consular functions and the promotion and defense of the interests of Timorese citizens abroad.

== Minister ==
The incumbent Minister of Foreign Affairs and Cooperation is Bendito Freitas.

== Headquarters ==
The Ministry's headquarters, developed with the assistance of Chinese funding, are on Avenida de Portugal, Praia dos Coqueiros, Dili. Designed, built and furnished by the government of China with almost no involvement by Timorese workers or suppliers, they were constructed between 2009 and 2013, at a cost of US$12 million.

== History ==
The Ministry was created in 2002.

== See also ==
- List of ministries of foreign affairs
- Politics of Timor-Leste
