= Order of Timor-Leste =

Order of Timor-Leste Ordem de Timor-Leste
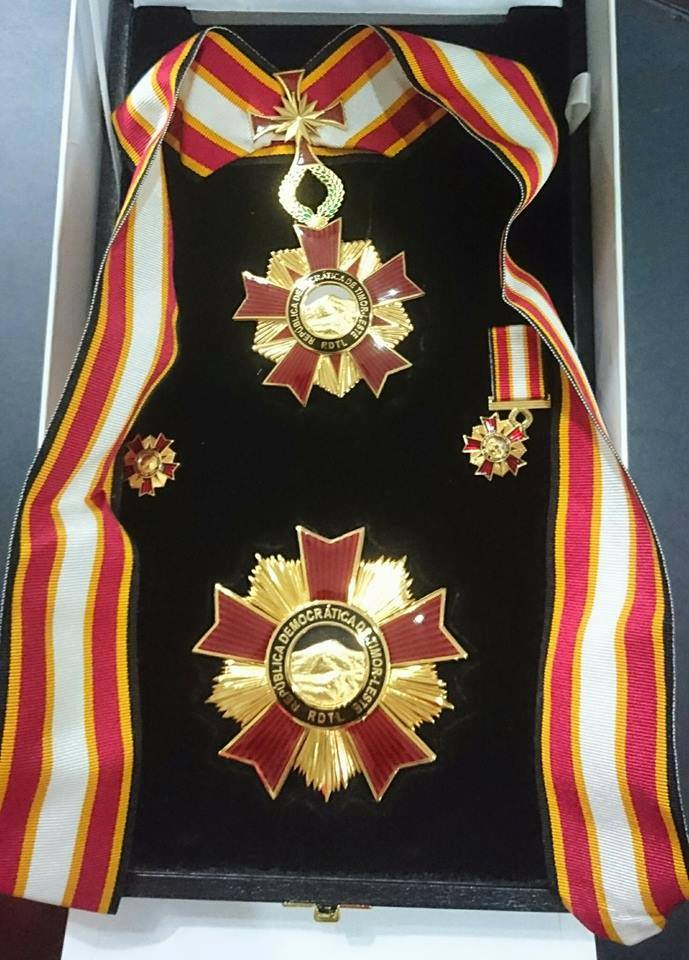
- Awarded for: Recognition of significant contributions to national peace and stability.
- Country: Timor-Leste
- Presented by: the President of Timor-Leste
- Eligibility: Civilians and military personnel including foreigners
- Established: 6 May 2009
- Ribbon bar of the order

Precedence
- Next (higher): Orders given to the Fighters and Martyrs for National Liberation
- Next (lower): Medal of Merit

The Order of Timor-Leste (Portuguese: Ordem de Timor-Leste) is the highest honour currently awarded by Timor-Leste. Established in 2009, the order was created after the original honours granted by Timor-Leste. It is of a more general and broader nature than the original orders related to Timor-Leste's independence. The order recognises the contributions of East Timorese and foreign nationals who have made a significant contribution to Timor-Leste, the Timorese or Mankind in general.

== Criteria and award procedure ==
The Order of Timor-Leste is awarded to recognise and thank those individuals who have made a significant contribution for the benefit of Timor-Leste, the Timorese, or Mankind. This general criteria recognises such acts as:

- Exceptional merit while in the performance of military duties or in the command of the armed forces while on campaign
- Acts of heroism, both military and civil
- Exceptional acts of sacrifice or self-denial for the benefit of the country or others
- Distinguished service in the performance of duties related to public administration, in the magistracy, or diplomacy
- Military service of an exceptional nature
- Cultural merit, particularly in the fields of literature, science, art, or education
- Relevant services provided to help the dignity of man or defence of the cause of freedom
- Any public or private works which demonstrate selflessness and self-denial for the benefit of the community
- Distinguished service in the field of sports

The President of Timor-Leste may present the Order of Timor-Leste on his own initiative, by the proposal of the National Parliament, or by a proposal of the Council of Ministers. The Minister of Defence and Security and the Chief of Staff of the Armed is consulted when the order is to be presented to East Timorese or foreign military personnel. The Minister of Defence and Security and the General Commander of Timor-Leste's National Police Force is consulted whenever the order is to be presented to East Timorese or foreign members of police forces. The Foreign Minister is consulted whenever the order is to be presented to a foreigner.

== Grades ==
The Order of Timor-Leste is presented in four grades:

- Grand Collar
- Collar
- Medal
- Insignia

Each grade may only be bestowed once upon the same person. The Grand Collar is bestowed exclusively on to Heads of sovereign States. Upon the completion of their term of office those persons who have served as the President of the Republic are entitled to be awarded the Grand Collar of the Order of Timor-Leste. The collar is granted on the day following the installation of the next President of the Republic.

The medal of the order may also be granted to communities, institutions, diplomats, police forces and units and military units. The medal is granted to entities deemed worthy of recognition by way of an official report of the Council of Ministers, which have existed for at least 15 years and are likely to exist on into the future. Military and police units are not held to this same standard.

== Notable recipients ==
Grand Collar of the Order

- Bill Clinton
- Pedro Pires
- Susilo Bambang Yudhoyono
- Joko Widodo
- Samora Machel
- David Hurley
- Marcelo Rebelo de Sousa
- Umaro Sissoco Embaló
- Hassanal Bolkiah
- Droupadi Murmu
- Anwar Ibrahim
- Anthony Albanese
- Lawrence Wong
- Megawati Soekarnoputri

Collar of the Order

- Mário Viegas Carrascalão (awarded 18 May 2017)
- Sir Peter Cosgrove
- Noam Chomsky
- Francisco Guterres
- Basílio do Nascimento

Medal of the Order

- Judith Fergin
- Sir Angus Houston
- Timor-Leste Defence Force
- National Republican Guard (Portugal)
- UN Police UNMIT
- Mohamed Salama Badi
- Max Stahl
- East Timor and Indonesia Action Network
- Mrs. Suzanne Wilson-Uilelea
- Listyo Sigit Prabowo
- Eddie de Pina

Insignia

- Duarte Pio, Duke of Braganza

Unknown Class

- Aníbal Cavaco Silva
- Fernando de Araújo
- António Ramalho Eanes
- Jaime Gama
- Lee Chiong Giam (2012)
- Vicente Guterres
- Filomeno da Paixão de Jesus
- Gordon McIntosh
- John Pilger
- José Ramos-Horta
- António Manuel Fernandes da Silva Ribeiro
- Taur Matan Ruak
- Seeds of Hope
- The people of Portugal
- The trade union movement of Australia
- Kofi Annan
- The people of Vanuatu

== See also ==
- Orders, decorations, and medals of Timor-Leste
