= Arsénio Bano =

East Timorese politician

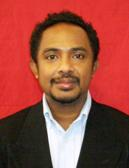
- Arsénio Bano in 2007

President of the SAR Oecusse-Ambeno

Personal details
- Born: March 23, 1974 (age 51) Oecusse-Ambeno, Portuguese Timor

Arsénio Paixão Bano (born 1974 in Oecussi-Ambeno) is an East Timorese politician and the vice-president of Fretilin, a post to which he was elected by the party's Central Committee in July 2007. He served in the government as Minister of Labor and Community Reinsertion until August 2007.

Bano is a member of Fretilin's Central Committee and its National Political Commission. He was elected to a seat in the National Parliament in the June 2007 parliamentary election as the third name on FRETILIN's candidate list.
