= Roque Rodrigues =

Timorese politician

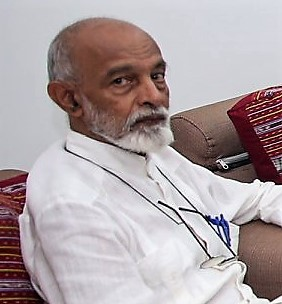
Roque Félix Rodrigues in 2020

Roque Félix Rodrigues (born 1949) is a former East Timorese defense-minister who had to resign due to the 2006 East Timorese crisis. On 2 October 2006, the United Nations Independent Special Commission of Inquiry found that he, along with Interior Minister Rogerio Lobato and Defence Force Chief Taur Matan Ruak, acted illegally in transferring weapons to civilians during the crisis. His later role as a security consultant for José Ramos-Horta caused controversy and ultimately his dismissal.

Rodrigues is a Mestico and is of Portuguese, Goan and East timorese descent.
