= Kaha =

Kaha may refer to:

== Places ==
- Kaha, Iran, a village in Hormozgan Province, Iran
- Kaha, Kalbajar, a village in the Kalbajar District, Azerbaijan
- Kaha, Lachin, a village in the Lachin District, Azerbaijan
- Kaha, Parang, a barangay in Parang, Sulu, Philippines
- Te Kaha, a town in New Zealand
- Kaha-ri, a district of Usi province, North Korea
- Qaha, a city in Egypt, often spelt Kaha

== Other ==
- Kaha (Māori), a Māori term roughly translating as strength
  - Kia kaha, a Māori term of affirmation or support
- Daniel Kaha (born 1989), Israeli footballer
- HMNZS Te Kaha (F77), a New Zealand naval frigate
- Ka-Ha, a type of Chinese armoured vehicle
- KAHA- a Hawaiian radio station now broadcasting as KPOI-FM
- Kaha is also a Sanskrit term meaning "to speak"
- Kaha Pte - Singapore wearable technology company
- Kaha, a genus of planthoppers from the family Derbidae from SE Asia.
