= Operation Astute =

Australian military operation

International Stabilization Force Operation Astute
- Part of 2006 East Timorese crisis
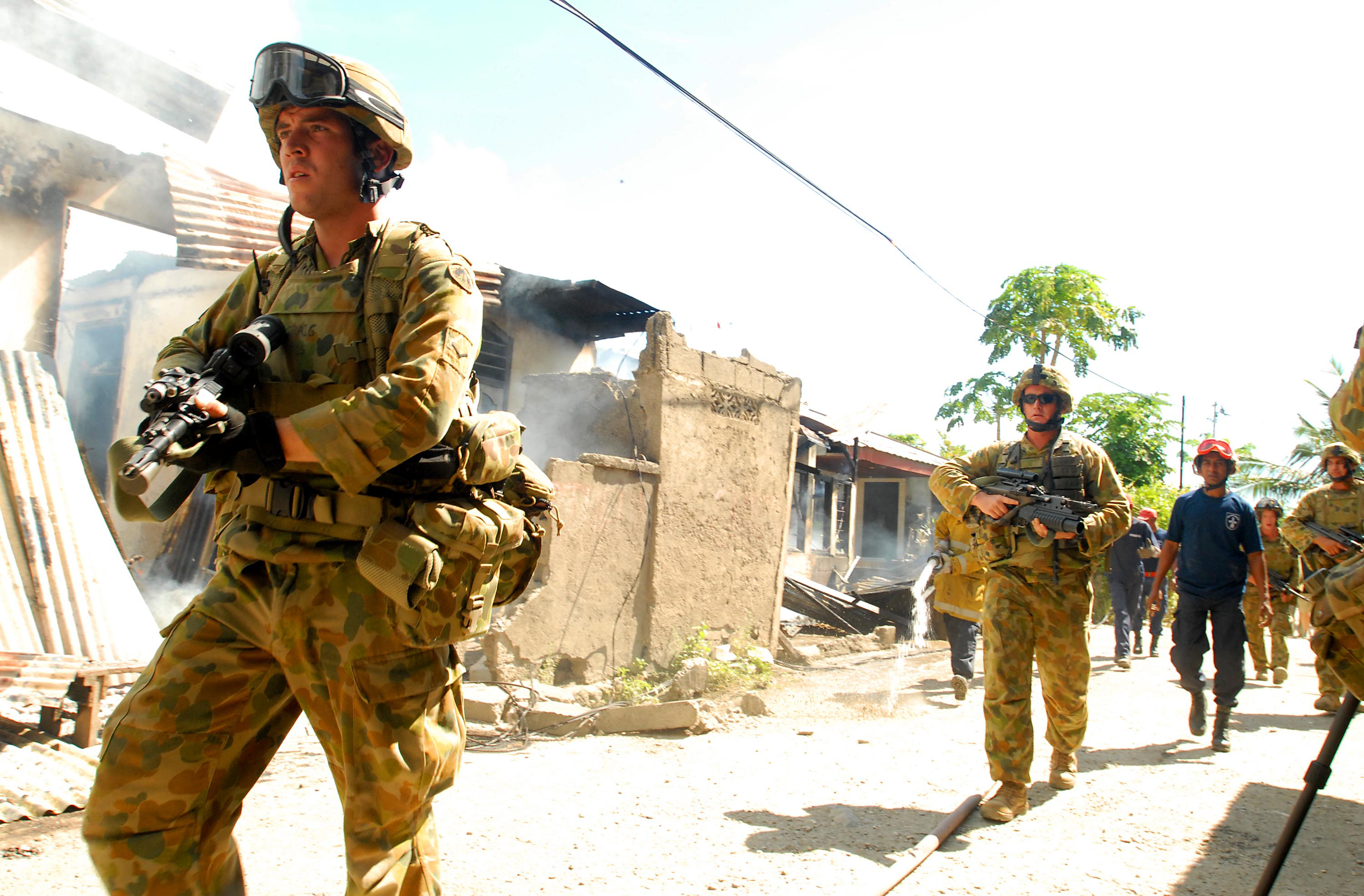
- Australian soldiers supporting the Dili Fire Service in June 2006
Date	25 May 2006 – 25 May 2013
Location	East Timor
Result	Stabilisation of East Timor

Belligerents
Australia; New Zealand; Malaysia; Portugal; East Timor (government troops); United Nations soldiers	Renegade elements of the FDTL

Commanders and leaders
Bill Sowry; Mick Mumford; Ismeth Nayan Ismail; Jorge Barradas; Taur Matan Ruak	Gastão Salsinha; Alfredo Reinado †

Strength
13,536 troops 372 police 9 ships	Unknown

Casualties and losses
2	Unknown

The International Stabilization Force or Operation Astute was an Australian-led military deployment to East Timor to quell unrest and return stability in the 2006 East Timor crisis. It was headed by Brigadier Bill Sowry, and commenced on 25 May 2006 under the command of Brigadier Michael Slater. The operation was established at the request of East Timor's government, and continued under an understanding reached between Australia, East Timor, and the United Nations, with the United Nations Integrated Mission in East Timor supporting and helping to develop East Timor's police force. Other countries deploying soldiers to East Timor include Malaysia, New Zealand and East Timor's former colonial power Portugal, operating under independent command.

== Initial tasks ==
The initial tasks of the operation were to:

- Allow for the evacuation of foreigners.
- Restore stability and confine conflict to secured areas.
- Assess and locate the weapons possessed by conflicting groups.
- Establish a safe environment for dialogue to resolve the crisis.

== Deployment ==
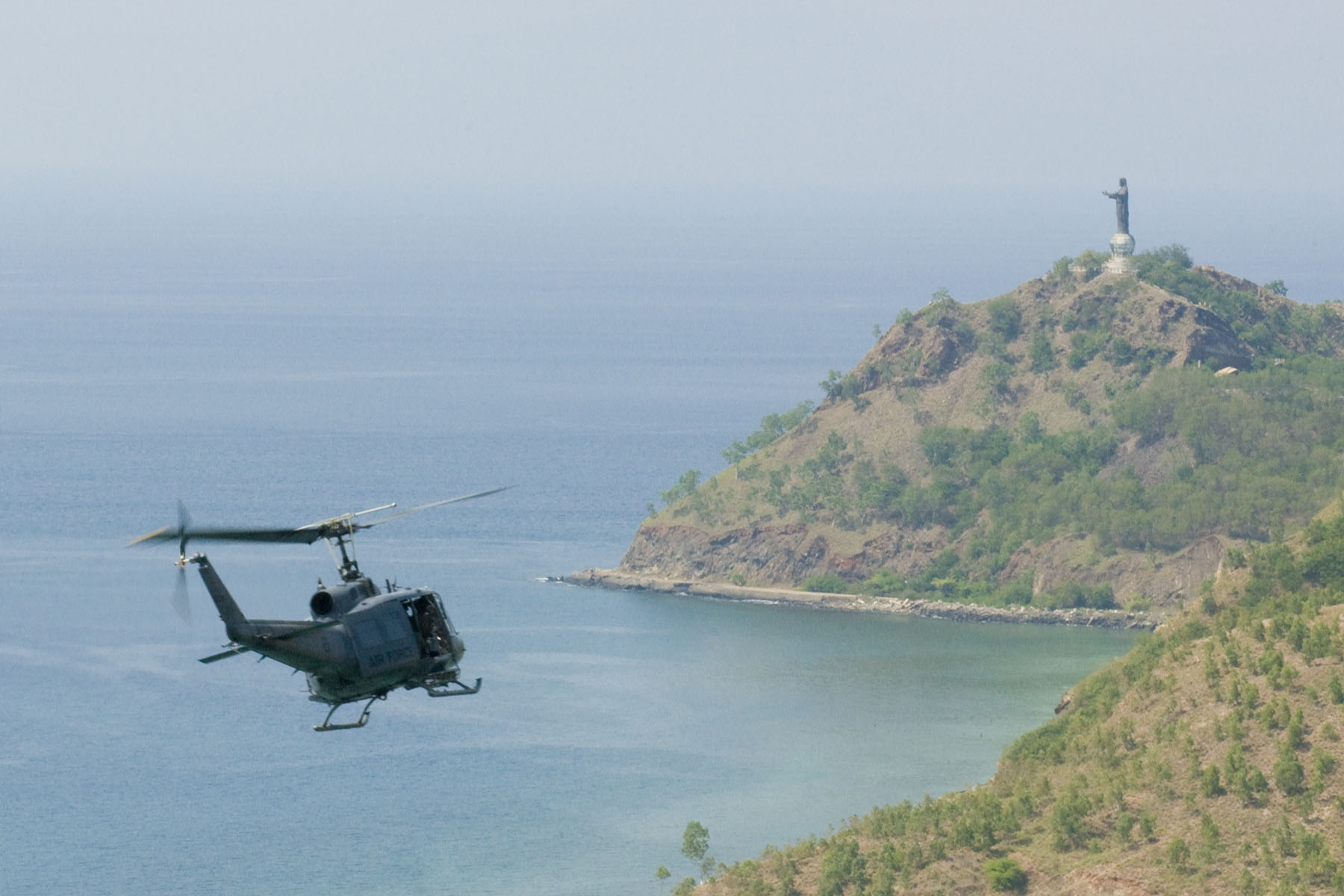
UH-1 Iroquois flying over Dili. The Cristo Rei of Dili can be seen in the background

A forward deployment of approximately 200, including a commando company from the 4th Battalion of the Royal Australian Regiment & C Coy, 2nd Battalion of the Royal Australian Regiment, secured an entry point for follow-on forces centred on Dili Airport. The full deployment consisted of a battalion group of about 1,800 personnel drawn from the 2nd Battalion of the Royal Australian Regiment & 3rd Battalion of the Royal Australian Regiment and other Australian and New Zealand Army units. Evacuations were carried out by C-130 Hercules aircraft from the Royal Australian Air Force, using RAAF Base Darwin as a Forward Operating Base.

Initial assets deployed included the guided-missile frigate HMAS Adelaide, the replenishment vessel HMAS Success and the amphibious landing/hospital ship HMAS Kanimbla. Landing ships HMAS Tobruk and HMAS Manoora were also sent to East Timor with follow-on forces.

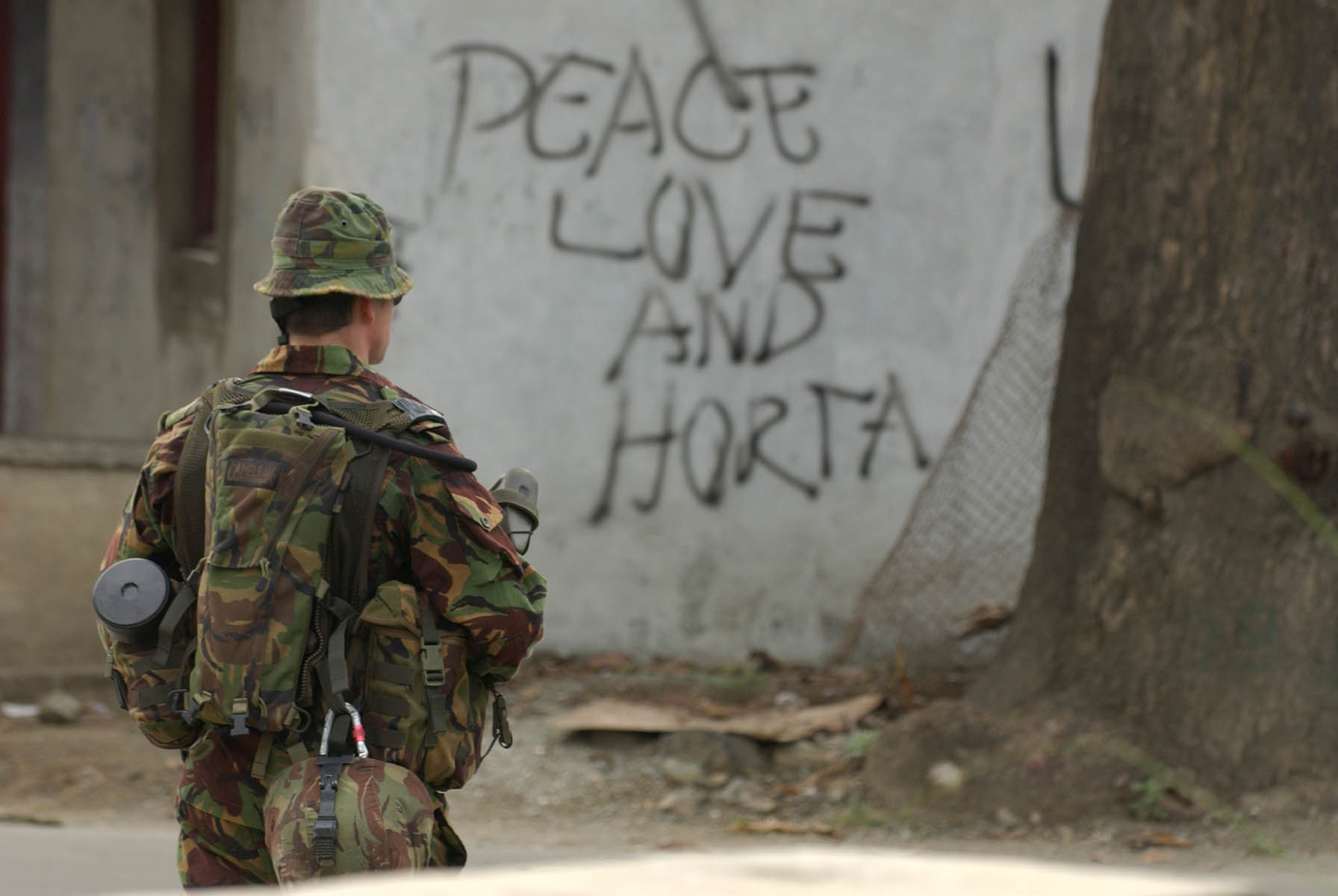
A New Zealand ISF soldier patrols Dili on polling day. Support for candidate Horta is displayed in background.

Operation Astute was established at the request of East Timor's government. Troops from former INTERFET nations including mostly from Malaysia, New Zealand and Portugal have augmented the Australian force. Prior to sending troops, each participating government negotiated a Status of Forces Agreement (SOFA) with the government of East Timor.

Besides Australia, New Zealand and, for a time, the Malaysian Army forces began arriving on 26 May by air and Portugal had also sent troops to East Timor. Initially, over 3,000 soldiers were deployed, but after the United Nations sent an international police mission (UNMIT) at the end of August 2006 and the situation calmed down, troop numbers were reduced. The ISF and UNMIT now jointly maintained law and order and helped rebuild the East Timorese security forces. An important task of both was also to ensure that the presidential and parliamentary elections in 2007 proceeded reasonably peacefully. Australia, however, insisted that the ISF remain under its leadership and not under UN leadership.

The ISF's attempt to capture the fugitive leader of the 2006 rebel soldiers, Alfredo Reinado, was unsuccessful. An attempted seizure in Same failed despite the deployment of an Australian special force and helicopters. Reinado was later killed in an assassination attempt on the East Timorese leadership on 11 February 2008.

In February 2008, following the attack, Australia initially increased its troops from 800 to 1000. By the end of October 2008, the ISF still consisted of a total of about 1000 men. Australia provided soldiers from the ANZAC Battle Group of the 1st Battalion of the Royal Australian Regiment from Townsville. In addition, there were units from the Army Aviation, Logistics, Military Police and Pioneers. In October 2009, the Australian contingent was down to 650 men. New Zealand still provided 155 soldiers in December 2009. These included an Infantry Rifle Company attached to the ANZAC Battle Group and two Iroquois helicopters with 32 members of No 3 Squadron of the Royal New Zealand Air Force.

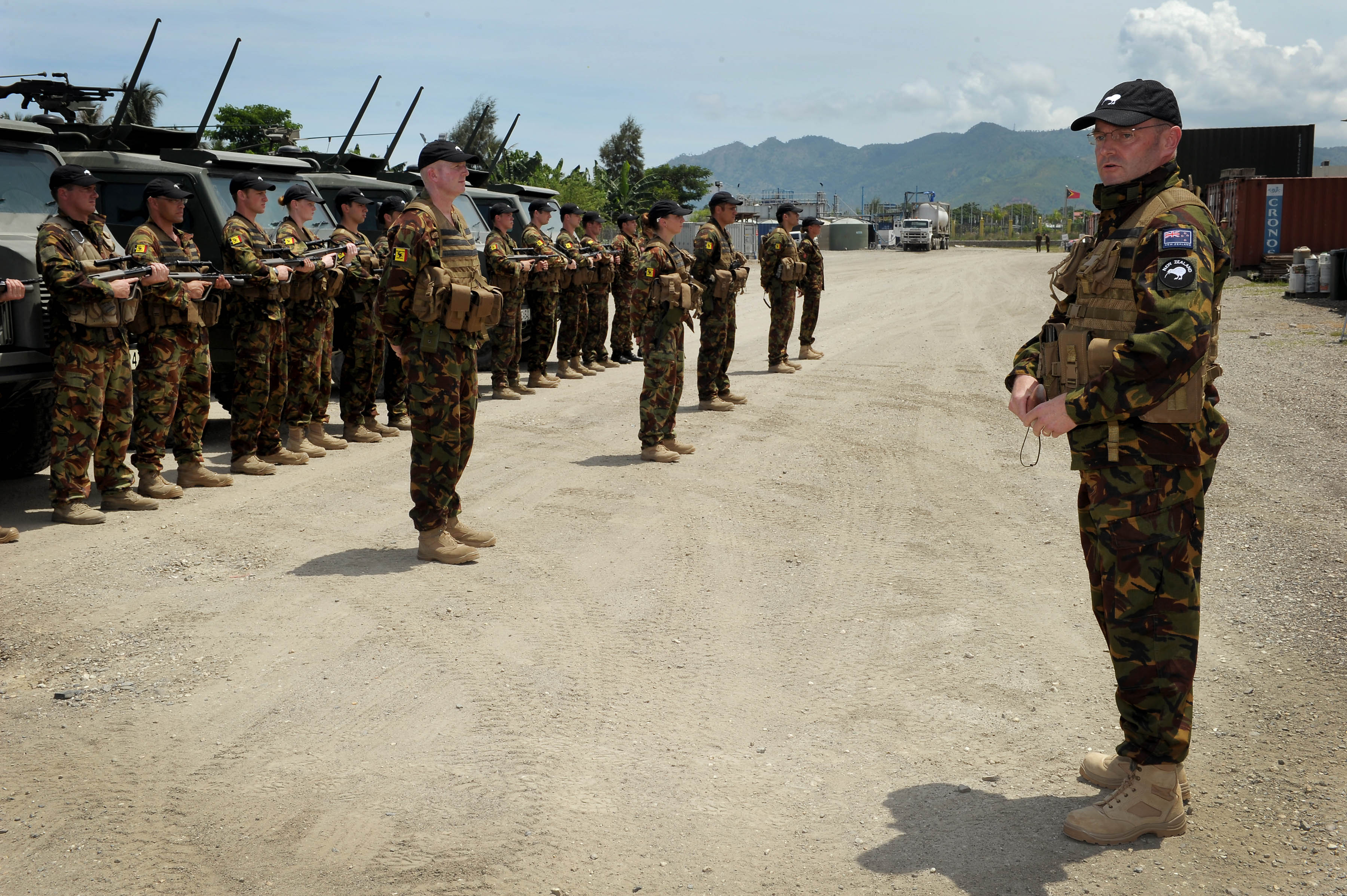
Handover ceremony to East Timor Authorities in 2012

In 2010, the force was reduced to 400 Australian and 75 New Zealand soldiers. The rebel movement subsequently collapsed in the following weeks. Troops were gradually reduced due to the progress made in stabilising the country, and it was decided to withdraw foreign security forces after the 2012 presidential and parliamentary elections.

== Timeline ==
=== May 2006 ===
24 May

- 21:59 (Canberra) Acting Prime Minister of Australia, Peter Costello, announced in a press conference that East Timor had requested Australia "send defence forces to East Timor to help in maintaining and re-establishing public order". Australia would send an advance party including the Vice Chief of Defence Force to negotiate conditions of the deployment the following morning.

25 May

- 07:00 (Canberra) Prime Minister of Australia John Howard arrives back in Canberra from Dublin early, though not officially because of the East Timor crisis.
- 12:30 (Darwin) A RAAF 34SQN Challenger 604 (VIP jet) was tasked to fly the Australian Vice Chief of Defence Force from Canberra to Dili via Darwin, to negotiate the rules of engagement of the Australian operation, and other conditions of deployment. However, on arrival in Darwin the Chief of the Defence Force ordered the aircraft to remain in Darwin, due to a dramatic increase in violence in Dili.
- (Dili) RAAF 37SQN C130J Hercules aircraft arrive at Dili from Darwin with 130 commandos on board, together with 4 Australian Army Black Hawk helicopters. The Vice Chief of Defence Force was also on board the C130, after being unable to fly to Dili on the RAAF VIP jet. Dili Airport is now under Australian military control. However the VCDF is unable to leave the airport due to security concerns.
- (Dili) HMAS Adelaide arrives in Dili Harbour.
- 18:43 (Canberra) Prime Minister John Howard announces in a press conference that the deployment will "go ahead without any conditionality" and that 1300 troops would be in place "in a very short order", despite a failure to negotiate conditions of the deployment with the East Timorese Government. He explains waiting for signatures could lead to significant further bloodshed and the East Timorese Government is desperate for Australian troops to arrive.
- (Darwin) The Royal Australian Air Force commence transporting troops to Dili. A 33SQN Boeing 707 ferries troops between Townsville and Darwin, whilst 36SQN C-130Hs and 37SQN C-130Js transport troops and supplies between Darwin and Dili. The flights also commence evacuations of civilians on the return legs. The flights continue throughout the night and the following day to form an air bridge between Darwin and Dili.

26 May

- (Dili) Malaysian Army soldiers begin arrive in Dili. RAAF aircraft continue to transport troops and equipment.
- United States Fleet Antiterrorism Security Team platoon arrives in Dili to protect the US Embassy.

27 May

- 13:30 (Darwin) A Royal New Zealand Air Force C-130H arrives in Darwin from Townsville, ready to deploy New Zealand soldiers to East Timor.

29 May

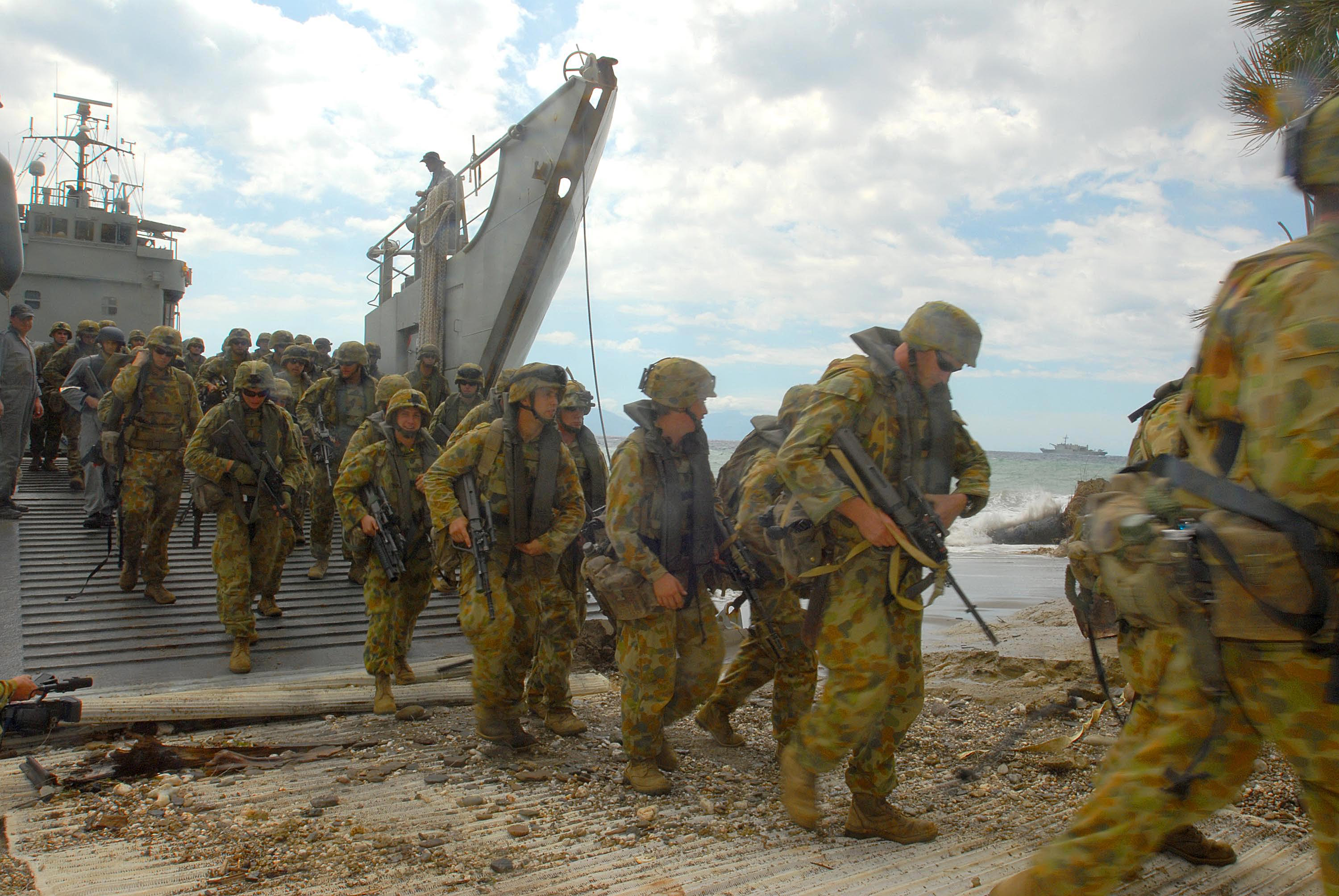
Australian ISF troops land in Comoro (2006)

- The initial deployment of Australian soldiers is completed.
- A platoon of 42 New Zealand soldiers arrives in Dili to secure the New Zealand embassy.

31 May

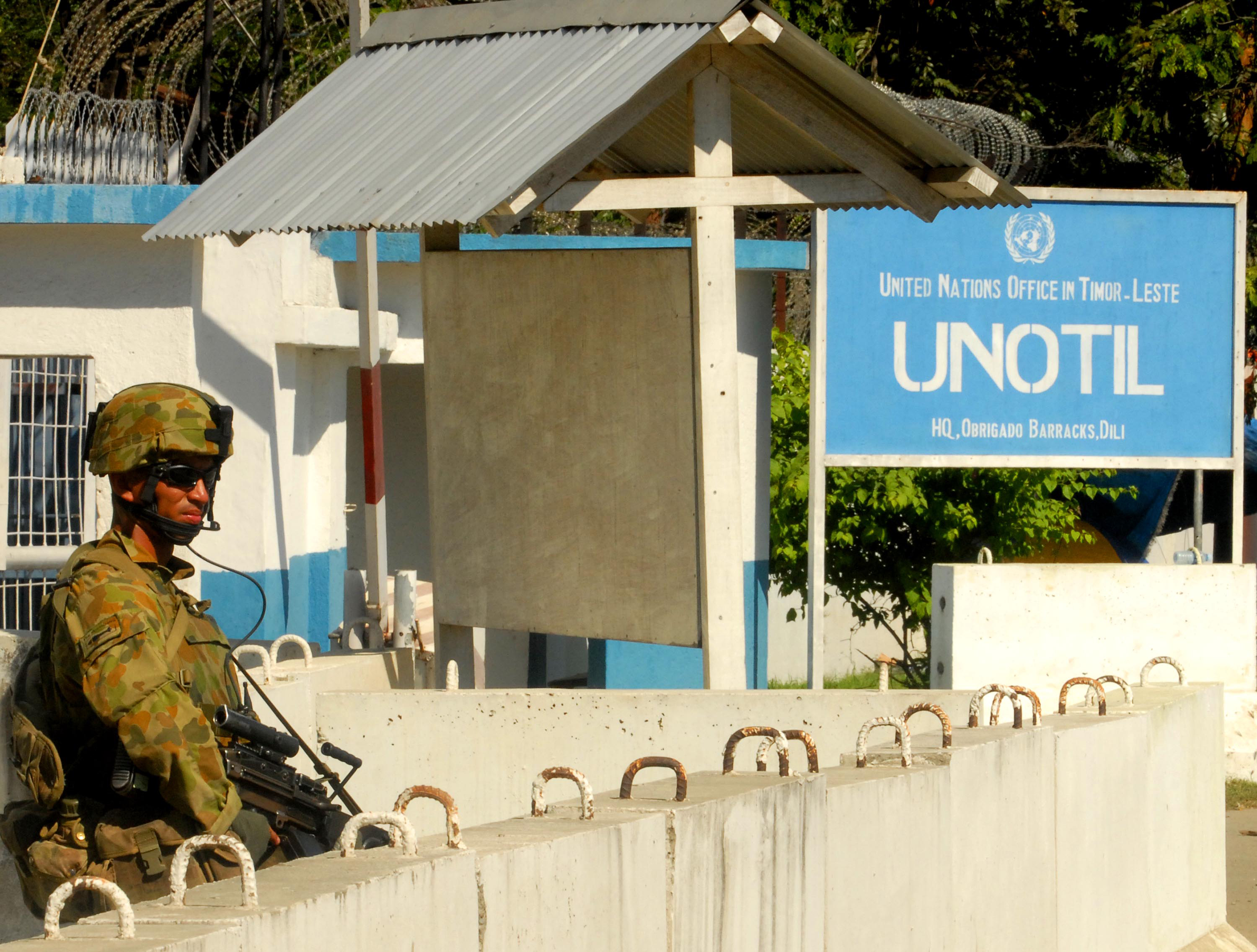
ISF soldier provides security to UNOTIL compound

- Delta Company, 2/1 Battalion, Royal New Zealand Infantry Regiment of 123 New Zealand soldiers arrives in Dili.

=== June 2006 ===
2 June

- 8 New Zealand military police arrive in Dili.

3 June

- USAF C-17 Globemaster III aircraft complete their task of ferrying Australian troops and equipment between Townsville and Darwin.

7 June

- Australian Defence Minister Brendan Nelson and New Zealand Defence Minister Phil Goff and Defence Secretary Graham Fortune visit Dili.

16 June

- Rebel Timorese soldiers begin handing their weapons over to Australian troops.

27 June

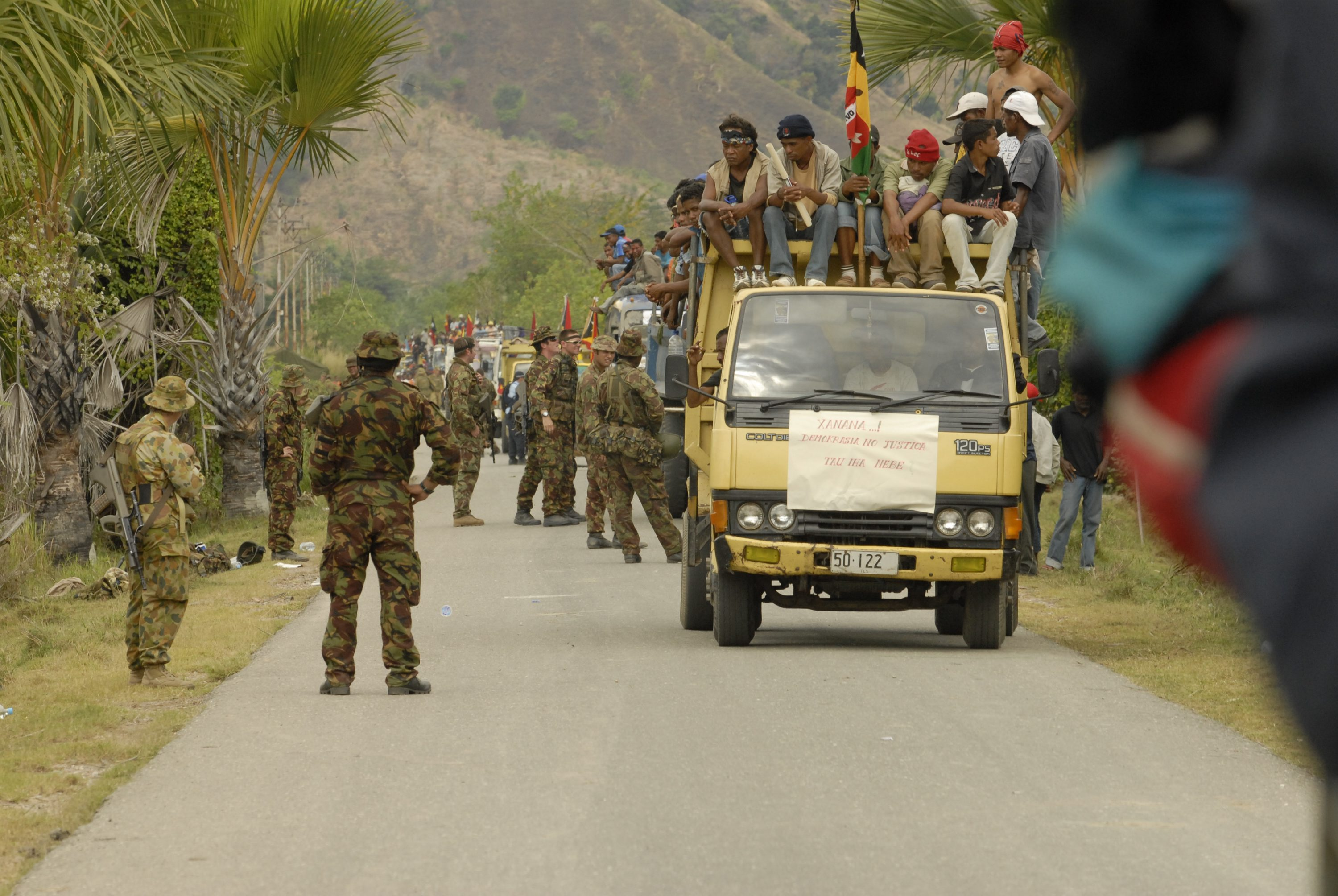
ANZAC Vehicle Check Point (VCP) near Hera, a few kilometres east of Dili.

- It is announced that a New Zealand soldier fired a warning shot during the week of 18–24 June. This is apparently the first shot fired during the intervention.

=== July 2006 ===
1 July

- 50 soldiers from 2/1 RNZIR and other units fly to Timor Leste to replace members of the initial New Zealand force.

18 July

- Australian Prime Minister John Howard visits Timor Leste. During his visit he announced that the Australian force in the country will be gradually reduced.

19 July

- HMAS Kanimbla departs Timor Leste for Australia carrying 250 soldiers and four S-70A Blackhawk helicopters.

=== August 2006 ===
3 August

- The Australian Government announces that the ADF has commenced a gradual drawdown of forces in Timor Leste due to the improving security situation. An infantry company, 23 armoured personnel carriers and support personnel are scheduled to depart Timor Leste over the next few weeks.

7 August

- A Company, 1st Battalion, Royal Australian Regiment returns to Townsville after 71 days in Timor Leste as part of Battle Group Faithful.

14 August

- G Company, 4th Field Regiment, Royal Australian Artillery returns to Townsville after being deployed since 26 May 2006.

27 August

- D Company, 2nd Battalion, Royal Australian Regiment returns to Townsville after being deployed to Timor Leste. Further soldiers from the 3rd Combat Signal Regiment are scheduled to return later in the week.

28 August

- It is announced that 44 New Zealand military personnel will return home from Timor Leste on 31 August.

=== September 2006 ===
7 September

- It is announced that a rifle company from 1 RAR will be deployed to Timor Leste by 9 September to reinforce the Australian-led force following Alfredo Reinado's escape from prison on 30 August.

19 September

- The final elements of the Australian Army Battle Group Faithful return to Australia having been replaced by the ANZAC Battle Group led by the 6th Battalion, Royal Australian Regiment.

=== October 2006 ===
26 October

- Brigadier Mal Rerden takes command of Joint Task Force 631, replacing Brigadier Mick Slater.

=== December 2006 ===
17 December

- Protests against UN troops intensify after they are accused of being responsible for the killing of a rebel gang member during factional clashes.

=== January 2007 ===
26 January

- Australia, East Timor, and the United Nations sign a memorandum of understanding under which Operation Astute continues and the United Nations Integrated Mission in East Timor supports and helps to develop East Timor's police force.

=== March 2007 ===
4 March

- After cornering Reinado at a compound in Same, Australian Special Forces enter the town and conduct an assault. Reinado evades capture but five of his men are killed in the Battle of Same. The Timor Leste government subsequently called off the manhunt, preferring to pursue a dialogue with the rebels instead.

=== May 2007 ===
9 May

- Australian forces successfully supervise round two elections, with no reports of violence.

10 May

- An unmanned Australian spy plane on operations over East Timor crashes into a house in the densely populated eastern suburb of Becora in Dili. Military helicopters were quickly sent to locate the wreckage, and an investigation was scheduled to begin the next day into whether the crash was due to technical failure or operator error.

=== August 2007 ===
2 August

- Brigadier John Hutcheson takes over command from Brigadier Mal Rerden.

=== January 2008 ===
31 January

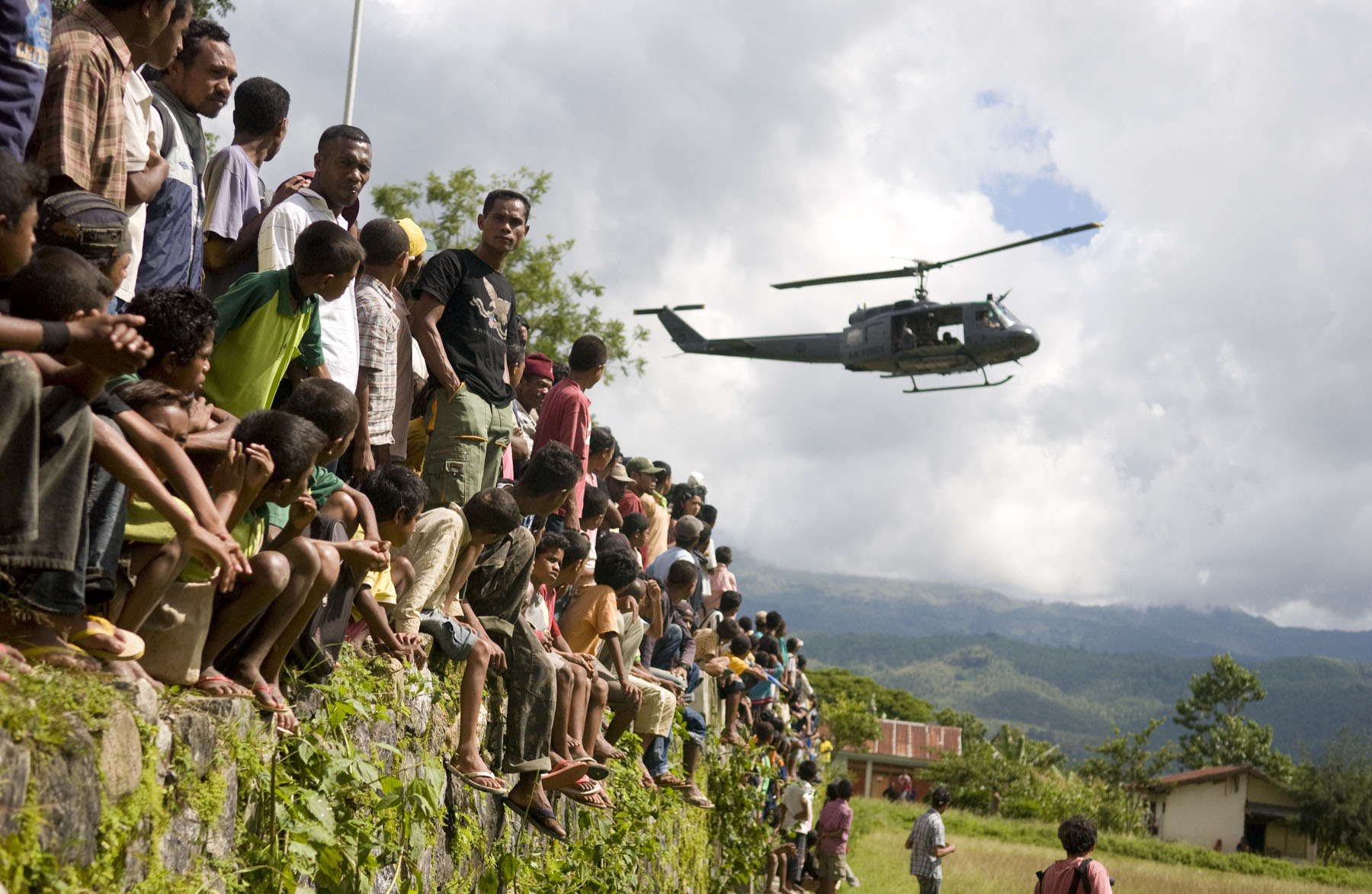
Joint New Zealand - Australian ISF projecting air power in the village of Aileu

- Brigadier James Baker takes over command from Brigadier John Hutcheson.

=== July 2008 ===
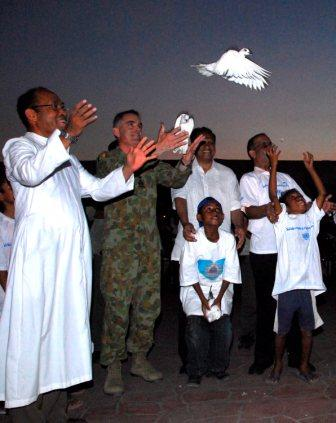
Brigadier Mark Holmes

31 July

- Brigadier Mark Holmes takes over command.

=== January 2009 ===
16 January

- Brigadier Bill Sowry takes over command from Brigadier Mark Holmes.

== Military units involved ==
Operation Astute is an Australian military operation. While the Malaysian and New Zealand contingents operate under overall Australian command, the Portuguese contingent operates under Portuguese national command. The initial Australian units deployed as part of the operation fell under the operational command of Brigadier Michael Slater, the commander of the Australian 3rd Brigade. The major unit involved in land operations was the 3rd Battalion under its commanding officer, Lieutenant Colonel Mick Mumford. This force was replaced in early September 2006 by a battalion group based around the 6th Battalion, Royal Australian Regiment designated the ANZAC Battle Group.

=== Australia ===
==== Australian Army ====
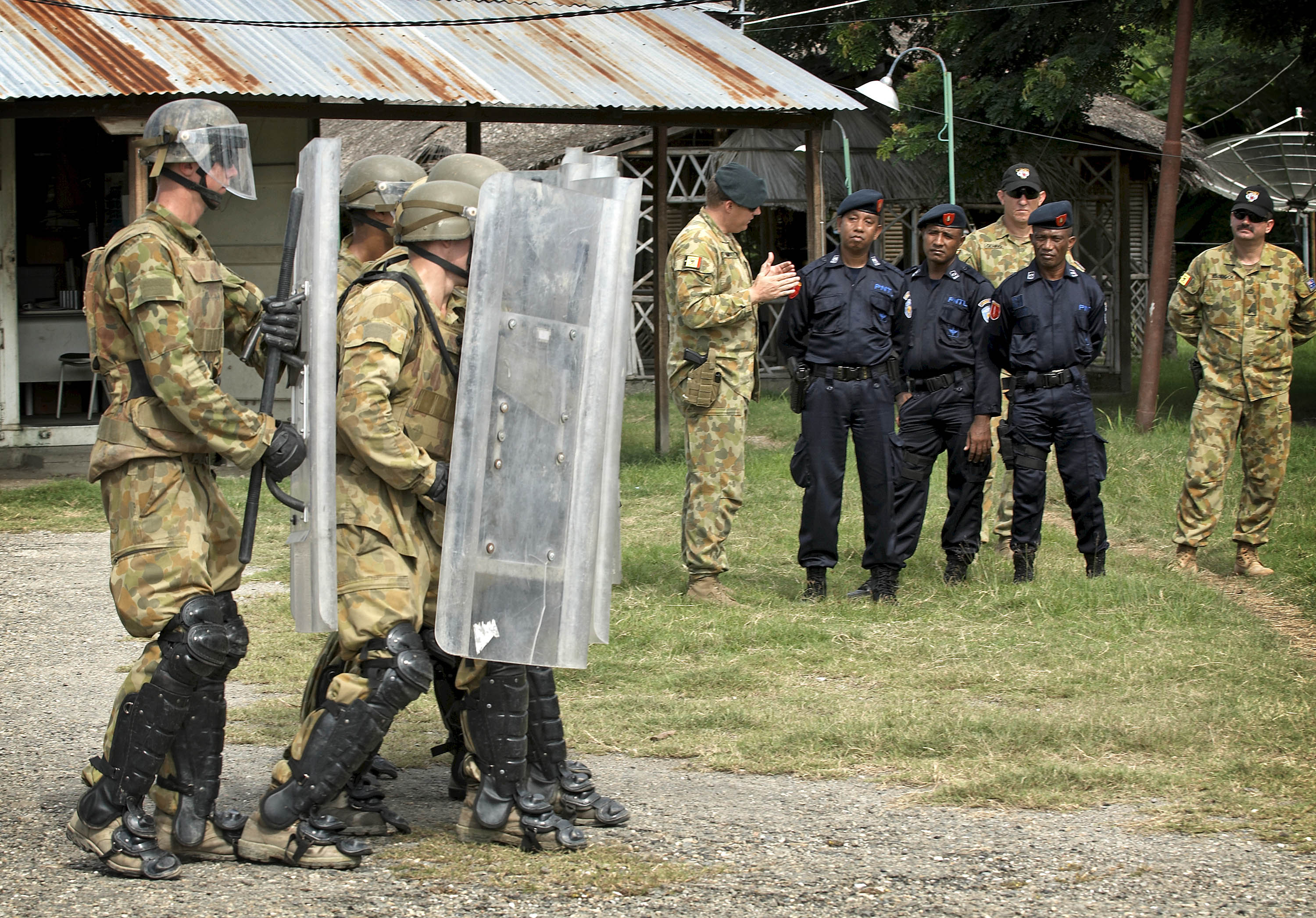
Australian ISF equipment and tactic demonstration to the PNTL

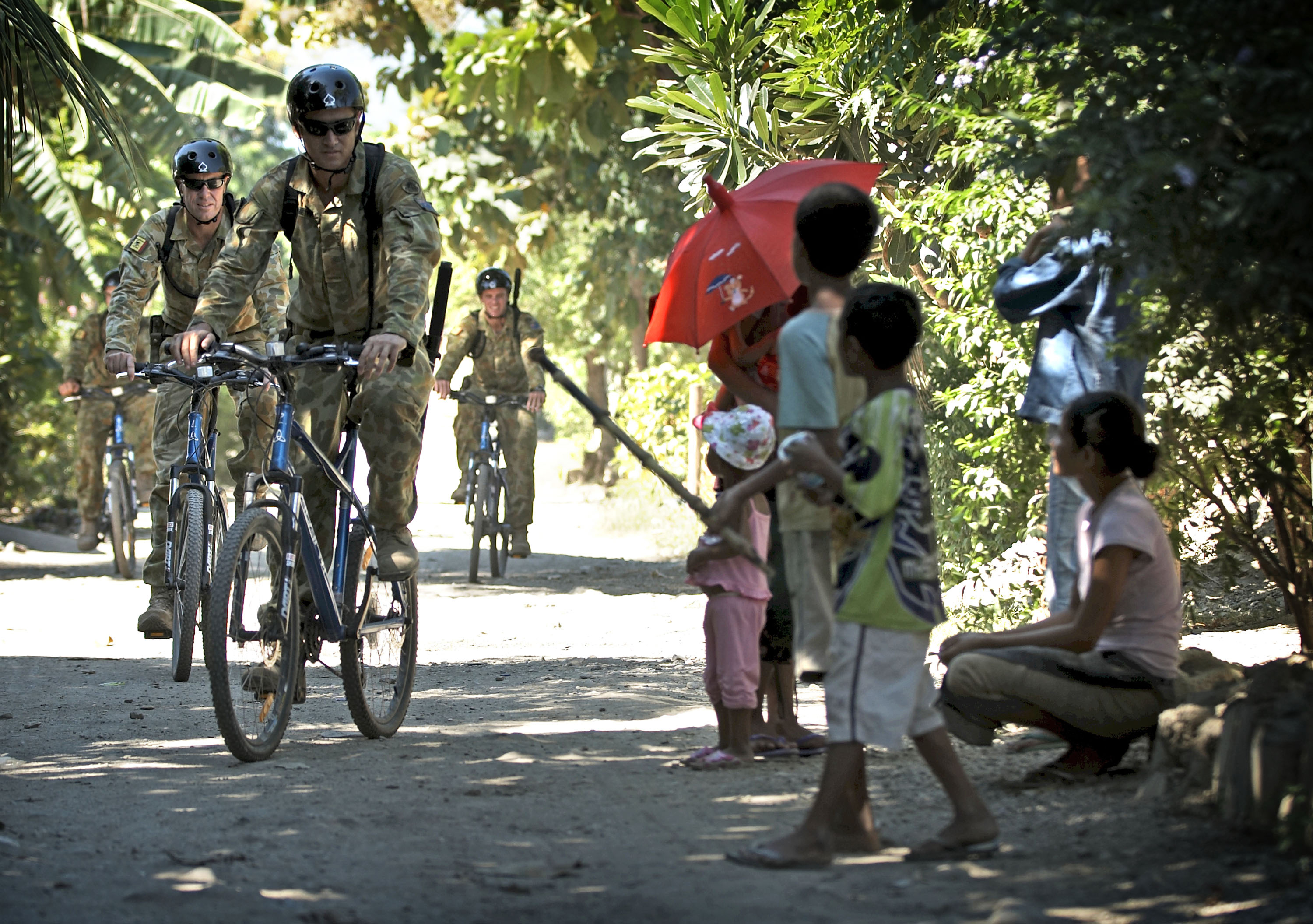
Australian ISF soldiers in Dili on bike patrol (2009)

Australia currently has approximately 404 personnel deployed to Timor-Leste, the majority of whom are formed into the ANZAC Battle Group, named due to the presence of a rifle company from the New Zealand Army integrated in its structure.

- Headquarters Joint Task Force 631
  - Elements, 1st Military Police Battalion
- ANZAC Battle Group: This battle group includes elements of other units:
- Headquarters, 1st Battalion, Royal Australian Regiment
  - B Company, 1st Battalion, Royal Australian Regiment
  - C Company, 1st Battalion, Royal Australian Regiment
  - Victor Company, 1st Battalion, Royal New Zealand Infantry Regiment
  - Battery, 16th Air Defence Regiment (operating as infantry)
  - Elements, 4th Field Regiment, Royal Australian Artillery
  - Elements, 17 Construction Squadron, Royal Australian Engineers
  - Elements, B Squadron, 3rd/4th Cavalry Regiment
  - Elements, B Squadron, 5th Aviation Regiment
  - Troop, 1st Aviation Regiment

The initial Australian Army force consisted of:

- Headquarters elements, 3rd Brigade
- 3rd Battalion, Royal Australian Regiment (3 RAR) battle group ('Battle Group Faithful'). This battle group included the following elements of other units:
  - Airborne Combat Team Bravo, 3 RAR
  - A Company, 1 RAR
  - C and D Companies, 2 RAR
  - G (108 Field Battery) Company, 4th Field Regiment, Royal Australian Artillery (operating as infantry)
  - B Squadron, 3rd/4th Cavalry Regiment (originally equipped with 33 x M113 armoured personnel carriers)
  - 16 Combat Engineer Squadron, 3rd Combat Engineer Regiment
- Commando Company Group, 4th Battalion (Commando), Royal Australian Regiment
- Troop, Australian Special Air Service Regiment
- 3rd Combat Service Support Group (based around the 3rd Combat Service Support Battalion)
- Aviation element ('Combat Team Vigilance')
  - Eight S-70A Blackhawk transport helicopters, drawn from B Squadron, 5th Aviation Regiment and the 171st Aviation Squadron (four helicopters since 19 July)
  - Four Kiowa light observation helicopters, 1st Aviation Regiment
  - Detachment, Emergency Response Squadron, Incident Response Regiment
  - Detachment, 9th Petroleum Platoon, [providing bulk fuel support to aircraft and land vehicles to ensure the mission was achieved.]

==== Royal Australian Navy ====
- HMAS Adelaide (until 28 May)
  - One S-70B-2 Seahawk helicopter, 816 Squadron RAN (until 28 May)
- HMAS Kanimbla
- HMAS Manoora
- HMAS Tobruk (until approximately 8 June)
- HMAS Balikpapan
- HMAS Tarakan
- HMAS Success (until 28 May)
- Two Sea King helicopters, 817 Squadron RAN

The Royal Australian Navy force committed to Operation Astute is apparently the largest amphibious task force in the Navy's history.

==== Royal Australian Air Force ====
- Elements, No. 33 Squadron RAAF (Boeing 707) – Domestic support only
- Elements, No. 36 Squadron RAAF (C-130H)
- Elements, No. 37 Squadron RAAF (C-130J)
- AP-3C Orion aircraft, No. 92 Wing RAAF
- Detachment, No. 2 Airfield Defence Squadron RAAF at Dili airport.
- No. 382 Expeditionary Combat Support Squadron
- RAAF Airload Team at Dili airport.

33SQN are assisting the operation by transporting troops from RAAF Base Townsville to RAAF Base Darwin, however only 36SQN and 37SQN have been flying from Darwin to Dili.

=== Malaysia ===
==== Malaysian Army ====
- 209 parachute soldiers from the 10th Paratrooper Brigade
- Transport aircraft
- Elements, 19th Battalion, Royal Malay Regt (Mechanised)
- Elements from Grup Gerak Khas (Army Special Forces)

==== Royal Malaysian Navy ====
- Elements from PASKAL (Naval Special Forces)
- Two warships; KD Mahawangsa and KD Indera Sakti

==== Royal Malaysia Police ====
The Malaysian Government currently anticipates replacing the Malaysian military force with Pasukan Gerakan Khas and General Operations Force operators of the Royal Malaysia Police at the end of July.

=== New Zealand ===
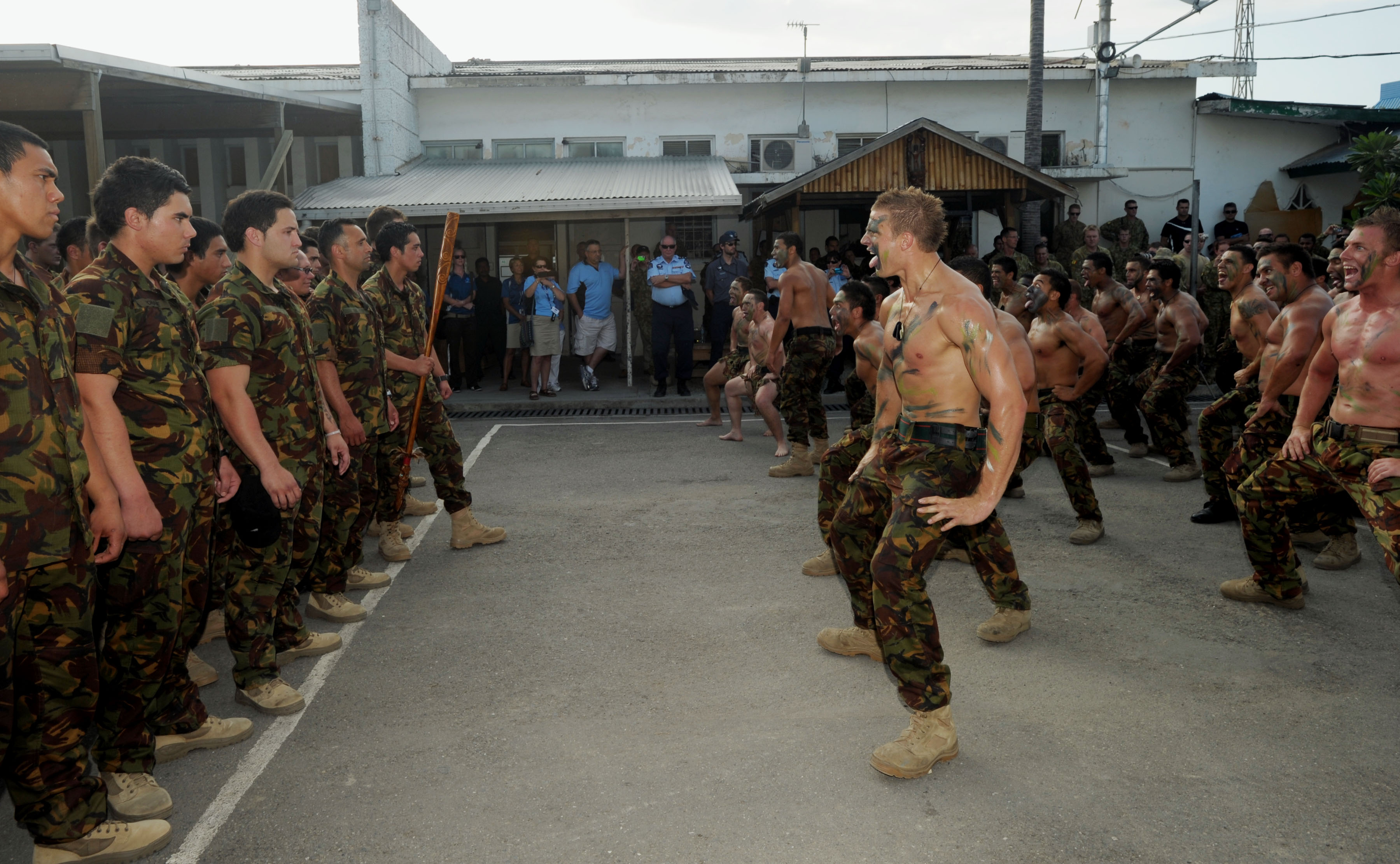
New Zealander ISF Soldiers welcoming the arriving personnel with a traditional Māori Powhiri (welcome ceremony) on Thursday, 03 November 2011.

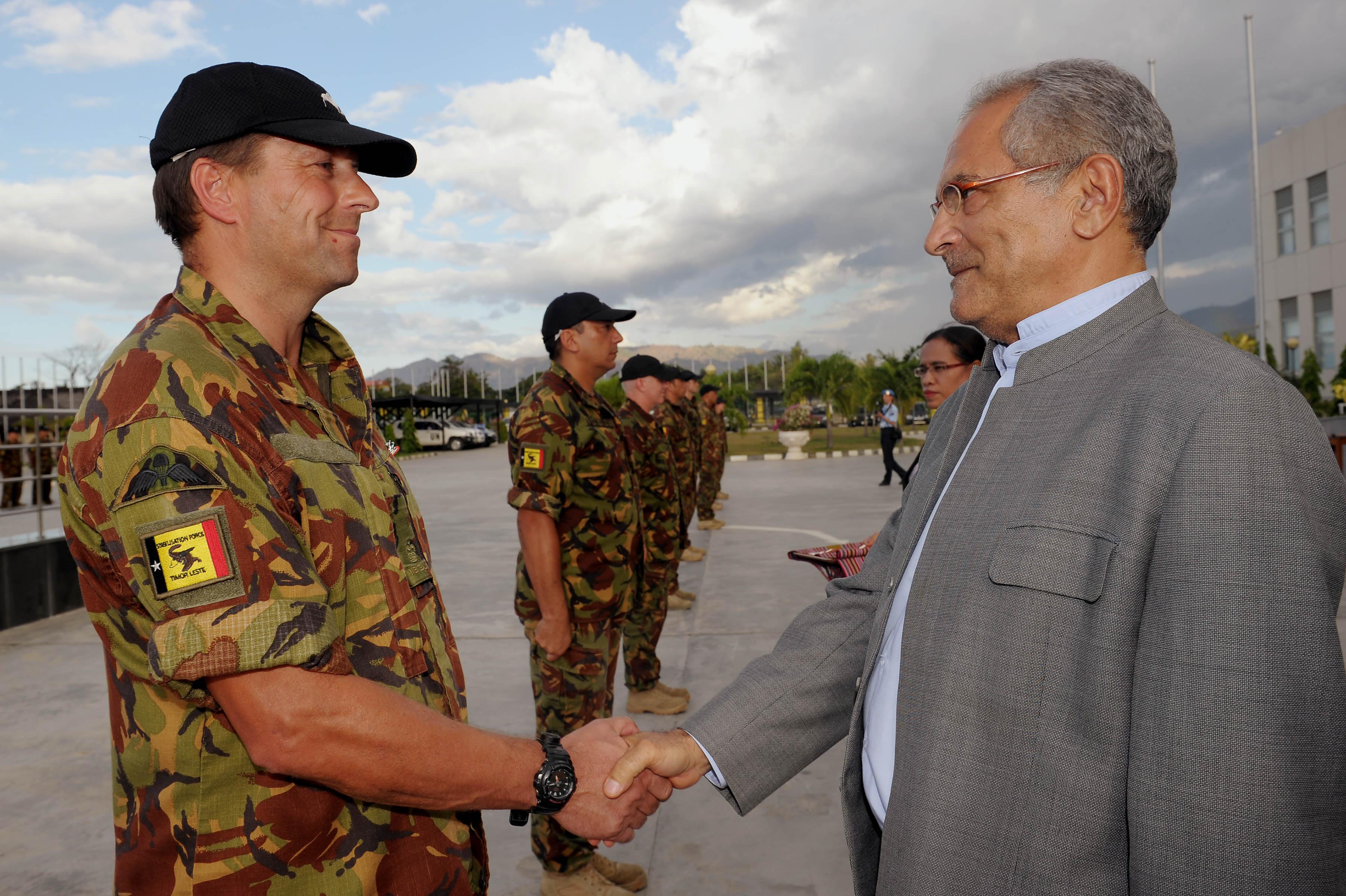
Honouring of New Zealand ISF soldiers by President Ramos-Horta (2011)

==== New Zealand Army ====
- Delta Company (reinforced), 2/1st Battalion, Royal New Zealand Infantry Regiment (Integrated into ANZAC Battle Group)
- Military police section, 2nd Military Police Platoon

==== Royal New Zealand Air Force ====
- One Boeing 757-200, No. 40 Squadron RNZAF
- One C-130H, No. 40 Squadron RNZAF

==== Royal New Zealand Navy ====
- HMNZS Endeavour
- HMNZS Canterbury
- HMNZS Te Kaha

=== Portugal ===
While the Portuguese forces deployed to East Timor are not operating under Australian command, they are acting in co-operation with the Australian, Malaysian and New Zealand forces which are under Australian command.

- Bravo Detachment of the Republican National Guard (GNR), initially with 120 soldiers and now with about 200
- 16 officers from the Special Operations Group (GOE) of the Public Security Police

=== United States ===
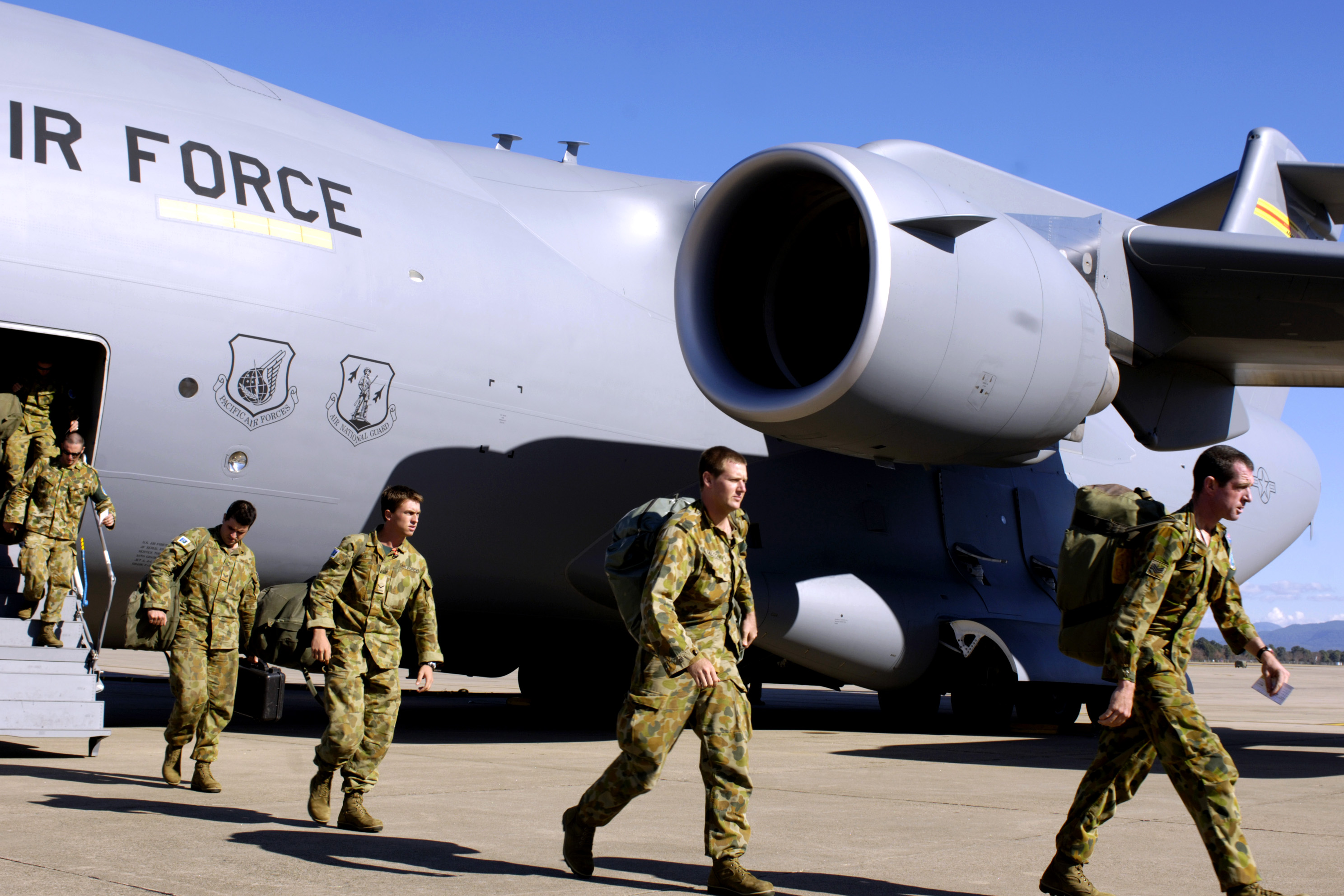
Australian soldiers disembark from a USAF C-17 at RAAF Base Richmond on 28 May 2006

- Two C-17 Globemaster III transport aircraft from the 15th Airlift Wing
- 6 person Combat Mobility Element from the 15th Logistics Readiness Squadron

The two United States aircraft flew transport flights between Australian air bases (mainly RAAF Base Townsville and RAAF Base Darwin) and were not deployed to East Timor. The aircraft did, however, visit the Solomon Islands in order pick up Australian equipment and personnel. The USAF force completed its mission on 3 June.

In addition, a platoon of the United States Marine Corps Fleet Antiterrorism Security Team was flown into Dili by a United States Navy C-40 Clipper on 26 May to secure the US embassy in Dili. This platoon does not appear to have fallen under Australian command as part of Operation Astute.

== Cost ==
The cost of Operation Astute has represented the third largest operation expenditure between 2006 and 2008, and the second largest from 2009. Below is the yearly expenditure on Operation Astute of the Australian Defence Force.

Year	2007	2008	2009	2010	2011	2012	2013
Cost (AUD$ million)	$107.7	$169.1	$213.8	$151.1	$170	$160.2	$89

== See also ==
- ANZAC Battle Group
- INTERFET
- Battle of Timor (1942–43)
