= Battle of Same =

2007 battle in Timor Leste

Coordinates: 9°00′S 125°39′E

- Part of the 2006 East Timorese Crisis
- Australian soldier from 6RAR at Same, 6 March 2007
| Date | 4 March 2007 |
| Location | Same, Timor Leste |
| Result | Inconclusive; Compound secured, rebels defeated; Escape of Alfredo Reinado |

Belligerents
| Australia | Petitioner rebels |

Commanders and leaders
| Mark Smethurst | Alfredo Reinado |

Strength
| 100 special forces, plus infantry and cavalry | 16 |

Casualties and losses
| None | 5 killed 1 wounded |

The Battle of Same (4 March 2007) was fought in the village of Same in Timor Leste, 50 kilometres (31 mi) south of the capital Dili, between Australian Special Forces and Petitioner rebels under the command of Alfredo Reinado. The operation occurred under the auspices of Operation Astute, being the deployment of Australian forces in the wake of 2006 East Timorese crisis, and resulted in the Australians successfully securing the target compound and defeating the small rebel force, before the assault was called off by the Timor Leste government. Reinado and nine other rebels subsequently evaded the Australian cordon, however, and made good their escape into the mountains.

== Prelude ==
Alfredo Reinado was a significant figure during the crisis, leading a mutiny in May 2006 during which nearly 600 soldiers deserted and triggered clashes between rival factions of the Timor Leste Defence Force (F-FDTL) and the National Police of East Timor (PNTL). He was subsequently detained on charges of murder and mutiny. However, he later escaped from Becora Prison in Dili along with 50 other prisoners on 30 August 2006 and had been on the run ever since, all the while attempting to negotiate a pardon. Following a large man-hunt he was finally tracked to a mountain compound in Same in late February 2007.

The situation became serious after Reinado's rebels raided a police station west of Maliana on 25 February and stole radios, automatic assault rifles, pistols and ammunition. In response Australian and New Zealand forces from the International Stabilisation Force (ISF), including infantry from 6th Battalion, Royal Australian Regiment and 1st Battalion, Royal New Zealand Infantry Regiment and armour from B Squadron, 3rd/4th Cavalry Regiment, were subsequently ordered to seal off Same. Following the failure of negotiations between the Timor Leste government and the rebels, the decision was made to detain Reinado by force, with President Xanana Gusmão ordering international security forces to arrest him.

== Battle ==
On 1 March Reinado was quoted on Al Jazeera as saying that "Australian special troops" were 800 metres (870 yd) away from his hideout and that he would "fight to the end", criticising the government and stating that "if any political leader wants to harm the stability of this nation, I have a right to stand up and defend the people." Brigadier Mal Rerden, Commander ISF, subsequently delivered an ultimatum, saying that "any operation to capture Reinado would involve appropriate use of force", urging him to surrender. "He has one option. He can help the people of Timor-Leste by surrendering himself and removing the threat of the weapons... If he cares about the people of Timor-Leste, if he cares about the people with him now, he would give up his weapons and surrender. Anything that happens from now on is his responsibility."

Reinado refused to surrender however, and following the written approval by the Timor Leste authorities for the conduct of offensive operations, four C-130 Hercules aircraft carrying a task force consisting of approximately 100 Australian special forces troops subsequently deployed to Dili on 2 March. Known as the Apprehension Task Group, it was believed to include a Commando Company from the 4th Battalion, Royal Australian Regiment as well as personnel from the Special Air Service Regiment. Under the overall command of Lieutenant Colonel Mark Smethurst, a Special Forces officer with extensive operational experience in Iraq and Afghanistan, the elite force was tasked with capturing Reinado and ending the stand-off.

Although many of the details of the operation remain classified, according to one report the Special Forces assault group moved in late on 3 March, while ISF conventional forces secured the approaches to the compound. An S-70A Blackhawk helicopter inserted one Special Forces team into the compound, while three M113 armored personnel carriers from 3/4CAV moved on the Petitioners, inserting another Special Forces team into blocking positions. At 01:45 on 4 March a second Blackhawk deployed another assault group into the corn garden close to the compound. It is believed that the rebels subsequently detected the Australian insertion and opened fire on the helicopter, with the Australians returning fire in response and killing two rebels before continuing with the assault. At least two more of Reinado's men were killed and another wounded during the subsequent fighting, which continued for a further 90 minutes.

However, for reasons that remain unclear Dili then ordered the Australian assault to cease, and the Special Forces teams were subsequently stood down. Reinado and nine other rebels—possibly including Gastao Salsinha according to one source—were believed to have evaded the Australian cordon amid the thick vegetation, and made good their escape into the mountains. The Australians subsequently occupied the compound.

== Aftermath ==
During the clearance of the compound five rebels were found dead and one wounded, while a number of others were also captured. There were no Australian casualties in the operation. Meanwhile, a major ISF cordon and sweep operation of the area failed to capture the survivors. Rerden was later quoted in the media as saying that the rebels were killed "because they were armed and posed an unpredictable threat." Further stating that "we don't have him," and we are "continuing the operation to capture him", denying that the operation had been botched although declining to give additional details. "Any operation is a series of phases... this operation is ongoing and it will succeed." He said his troops had cleared Reinado's base and captured some prisoners, but he declined to say how many.

Regardless, despite successfully securing the compound and defeating the small rebel force, the most immediate consequence of the mission was its failure to capture Reinado. Indeed, he remained on the run, leading to concerns about the potential for violence in the lead up to East Timor's presidential elections, set for 9 April. Equally there was significant criticism of the conduct of the operation in the press in Australia and from the public in Timor Leste, with large crowds rioting outside the Australian embassy in Dili and in the village of Gleno where Reinado grew up, trashing cars and two government buildings. Ultimately the elections passed peacefully however, and by mid-April 2007 the search for Reinado was called off by the Timor Leste government, ostensibly in order to facilitate dialogue.

In August 2007 Reinado subsequently met with José Ramos-Horta, who was by this time President, with the pair backing the initiation of a dialogue that would seek a peaceful resolution. However, on 11 February 2008 violence flared again, and Reinado was subsequently killed during a coordinated attempt to assassinate both Gusmão and Ramos-Horta.
