= Te Kaha (disambiguation) =

Te Kaha may refer to:

- Te Kaha – Town in Bay of Plenty, New Zealand
- Te Kaha (stadium) – Planned arena in Christchurch, New Zealand
- HMNZS Te Kaha – Anzac-class frigate of Royal New Zealand Navy
