= Vicente Guterres =

East Timorese politician

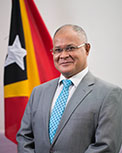
- Guterres in 2017

President of East Timor
- Acting
- In office 11 February 2008 – 13 February 2008
- Prime Minister: Xanana Gusmão
- Preceded by: José Ramos-Horta
- Succeeded by: Fernando de Araújo (Acting)

President of the National Parliament
- In office 30 July 2012 – 5 May 2016
- Preceded by: Fernando de Araújo
- Succeeded by: Adérito Hugo da Costa

Personal details
- Born: 22 January 1956 (age 70) Baguia, Portuguese Timor
- Party: CNRT
- Spouse: Maria Goretti Guterres Marques
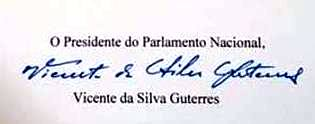
- Signature

Vicente da Silva Guterres (born 22 January 1956 in Baguia, Portuguese Timor) is a politician from East Timor, a member of the National Parliament of East Timor and its vice-president since 2007.

== Parliamentary role ==
In the June 2007 parliamentary election, Guterres was elected to the National Parliament as the second name on the candidate list of the National Congress for Timorese Reconstruction (CNRT), a party led by Xanana Gusmão.

He was elected president of the National Parliament without opposition in July 2012.

== Acting president of Timor-Leste ==
He became acting president of East Timor after President José Ramos-Horta was injured in an attack on his home on 11 February 2008. As acting president, he proclaimed a two-day state of emergency on 12 February. After his return from Portugal, the president of National Parliament, Fernando de Araújo, took over presidency on 13 February. During his time in office, he fought for greater efforts to combat poverty. According to OECD and WBG living standards in the country ranged from decent to below average.

== Honours ==
In 2017, he received the Order of Timor-Leste.

== See also ==
- Politics of East Timor

Political offices
Preceded by Fernando de Araújo	President of the National Parliament; 2012-2016	Succeeded by Adérito Hugo da Costa
Preceded by José Ramos-Horta	President of East Timor; Acting; 2008	Succeeded by Fernando de Araújo; Acting
