= Alfredo Reinado =

East Timorese military commander and rebel (1968–2008)

Major Alfredo Reinado
- Reinado in 2006
- Born: Alfredo Alves Reinado; 11 November 1968; Dili, Portuguese Timor
- Died: 11 February 2008 (aged 39); Dili, East Timor
- Military career
- Allegiance: East Timor
- Branch: Timor-Leste Army
- Service years: 1999–2006
- Rank: Major
- Known for: 2006 East Timorese crisis 2008 East Timorese assassination attempts

Alfredo Alves Reinado (11 November 1968 – 11 February 2008), sometimes spelled Reinhado, was a major in the military of Timor-Leste, the Timor Leste Defence Force (F-FDTL). He deserted on 4 May 2006 to join approximately 600 former soldiers who had been sacked in March 2006 after complaining of regional discrimination in promotions, sparking the 2006 East Timor crisis. Reinado was one of the leaders of the rebel soldiers, and the highest-ranking deserter.

== Military career ==
Reinado was captured by the Indonesian National Military (TNI) during their invasion of East Timor in 1975, and served as a porter for TNI in Sulawesi and Kalimantan.

He escaped to Australia in 1995 as one of 18 Timorese refugees who fled in a leaky boat and was detained at the Curtin Immigration Detention Centre in Derby, Western Australia. He later worked in the shipyards in Western Australia. After the referendum in which East Timor voted for independence, Reinado returned to the country to captain a tugboat owned by Rooney's Shipping. On the request of the Timorese government, Reinado entered the military of East Timor (Falintil-FDTL, or simply FDTL) and was appointed commander of the Naval Unit (which consists of two patrol vessels donated by the Portuguese Navy).

"In July 2004, Alfredo was removed as commander for getting into a fight with the police, and the following year was sent to a three-month naval training course at the Australian Command and Staff College. He reportedly became involved with a junior female Timorese soldier there and was disciplined on return by being removed from the navy and given command of the military police, a distinct downgrading." The already existing break between Alfredo and his commanding officers worsened, so that there may well have been personal factors that drove him to desert in early May 2006, in addition to outrage over F-FDTL actions.

However, due to his acerbic style, he was eventually transferred to the Army headquarters in the capital Dili by Brigadier-General Taur Matan Ruak, the commander of the FDTL.

Reinado's father and sister live in Australia. Over several years, Reinado travelled to Australia to receive military training from the Australian Defence Force, studying defence management in October 2003 and emergency management in August 2004. In 2005 he completed a three-month navy training module at the Australian Command and Staff College in Canberra. Reinado also received training from the Portuguese military and the Brazilian military. He was eventually assigned to the military police, where he was in charge of a platoon of 33 troops.

== Rebellion ==
On 4 May, Reinado and 20 members of his platoon, along with four riot police, deserted their barracks and joined the rebel soldiers in the hills, taking with them two trucks full of weapons and ammunition.

In an interview, Reinado said that he was motivated to leave his barracks and join the rebels following an incident on 28 April in which FDTL forces fired upon a crowd of rebel soldiers and unemployed youths demonstrating in the streets of Dili. He asserted that the Prime Minister Mari Alkatiri had given the order to fire into the crowd, because in his role as a military policeman he had escorted Colonel Lere Anan Timor, the chief of staff to FDTL commander Brigadier-General Ruak, to a meeting with Alkatiri, and had heard Lere say immediately after the meeting that "I already have orders to take action." Reinado also called for a full investigation into the events of 28 April, saying that Alkatiri's orders were "an unjustified act under the constitution".

It is alleged that on 23 May 2006, during negotiations with loyalists from 1st Battalion F-FDTL in the Fatuhai Pass east of Bekora, Reinado shot dead the lead loyalist scout as a patrol approached his position. The following day, Reinado and other Petitioner rebels from the Military Police platoon joined up with the Salsinha Petitioners and rebel Reserve Police, launching a major assault on Dili. Although these assaults were eventually halted by loyalist forces, they came close to cutting the town in half. Indeed, "at one stage the fighting closed the Dos Direitos Humanos Avenue... at Dili Helo Pad... and Petitioners seized the Telecom transmission tower near the then President Xanana Gusmão's house."

He was subsequently detained by Portuguese and Australian soldiers in Dili on 26 July on charges of illegally possessing weapons. Angered by his arrest he refused to sign court papers. He was later charged with murder.

== Escape from prison ==
On 30 August 2006, Reinado escaped from Dili's main jail with more than 50 other prisoners. Prison warden Carlos Sarmento said at least 57 inmates fled after breaking down several walls on the east wing. The break-out occurred within the New Zealand Defence Force area of operations and came just a week after the UN was given approval to replace the Australian-led mission responsible for keeping law and order.

The escape was by coincidence on the anniversary of the 1999 vote for independence from Indonesia in a referendum.

The escape created a new crisis for international security forces in East Timor, which were struggling to curb gang violence. Prime Minister José Ramos-Horta, said after visiting the jail two weeks earlier that security there should be improved.

Paulo Remedios, Major Reinado's lawyer, said that Major Reinado had been worried for some time about the lack of security at the jail.

"Threats have been made against Alfredo and he was taking them seriously," Mr Remedios said. "He told me of a plan to snatch him from the jail and to take him out of Dili on a boat – that was the rumour that my client heard."

A senior foreign security analyst based in East Timor said Major Reinado, former chief of the country's military police, "could easily disappear into the mountains" if not caught quickly. "And the problem is, there are still plenty of guns unaccounted for up in the mountains," he said.

Whilst on the run from authorities, Reinado made an appearance on Indonesia's Metro TV talk show Kick Andy. On the program, Reinado made open statements about his escape and his aims. Nobody but host Andy F. Noya and his crew knew the location of the interview.

== Manhunt ==
Following his escape, Reinado fled to his main support base in Maubisse, in the mountains. Australian soldiers from the SASR and 4 RAR were subsequently involved in an intensive search for the escapees. From his safe base, however, Reinado attempted to negotiate a pardon. As late as December 2006 he was being flown to negotiations by Australian helicopter. Ramos-Horta eventually lost his patience with Reinado's public demands and threats, and finally ordered ISF to cease negotiations in January 2007. Following a large man-hunt he was finally tracked to a mountain compound in Same in late February 2007.

The situation became serious after Reinado's rebels raided a police station west of Maliana on 25 February 2007 and stole radios, automatic assault rifles, pistols and ammunition. Australian and New Zealand forces from ISF, including infantry from 6RAR and 1RNZIR and armour from 3/4CAV, were ordered to seal off Same. Negotiations between the Timor Leste government and the rebels subsequently failed and the decision was made to detain Reinado by force.

After cornering Reinado in Same, Australian Special Forces entered the town and conducted an assault. Reinado evaded capture but five of his men were killed in the Battle of Same. In mid-April 2007, Prime Minister José Ramos-Horta said that the search for Reinado was being called off to facilitate dialogue. Reinado met with Ramos-Horta, who was by this time President, in August 2007, and they backed the initiation of a dialogue that would seek a peaceful resolution.

Xanana Gusmão opened talks with the Petitioners considered to be disaffected with Reinado and Salsinha's leadership, and a number were eventually convinced to enter cantonment in Dili under the leadership of Major Augusto Tara. In late 2007 Reinado was charged with eight counts of murder and numerous weapons offences relating to the violence in May 2006. Reinado failed to appear in court to face these charges on 24 January 2008. The Timor Leste government once again made plans to capture Reinado. According to one source: "with his support base fracturing, Reinado was increasingly isolated and [began] planning desperate action."

== Assassination ==
On 11 February 2008, East Timorese army spokesman Major Domingos da Câmara said that Reinado had been killed during coordinated attacks on Prime Minister Xanana Gusmão and President Ramos-Horta. Reinado's funeral, attended by hundreds of people, was held peacefully on 14 February in Dili. Alfredo Reinado's role as rebel leader was succeeded by Lieutenant Gastão Salsinha.

Some hold that Reinado had been shot at "very close range" in the back of the head, leading to speculation that he had been executed instead of shot in defence, despite the fact that the original autopsy report actually said "the manner of death specified is "Homicide" as a result of multiple gunshot wounds, including one inflicted from the front into the neck" and it is Leopoldino Mendonça Exposto, the other rebel who was killed along with Alfredo Reinado, that was shot in the back of the head.

== See also ==
- Operation Astute
