= Mick Mumford =

Colonel of The Australian Army

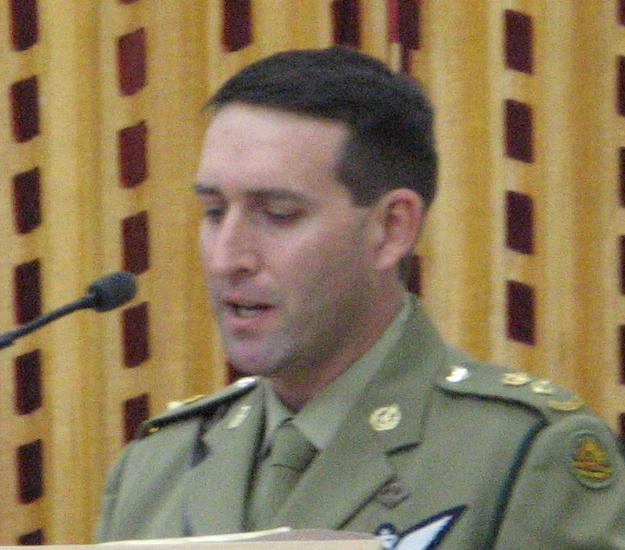
- Colonel Mick Mumford, June 2007
- Military career
- Allegiance: Australia
- Branch: Australian Army; Australian Army Reserve
- Service years: 1986–present
- Rank: Colonel
- Commands: 3rd Battalion, Royal Australian Regiment
- Conflicts: Iraq War; Operation Anode; Operation Astute
- Awards: Conspicuous Service Cross

Colonel Michael Anthony Mumford, CSC is a career officer in the Australian Army, now serving as a part of the Australian Army Reserve.

He came to prominence in 2006:

- Commanding officer, 3rd Battalion, Royal Australian Regiment, from early 2006, with the rank of lieutenant colonel;
- As CO of Private Jacob Kovco, the first Australian soldier to die during the Iraq campaign (April 2006);
- Commanding 3RAR during:
  - Operation Anode (Regional Assistance Mission to the Solomon Islands, specifically the Australian response to riots following 2006 general election, April 2006);
  - Operation Astute responding to riots in East Timor (May–June 2006);

He was promoted to the rank of colonel in late 2013.

== Other interests ==
Mumford is a former Chairman of the Military Christian Fellowship of Australia.

Mumford completed a Masters of Divinity at Malyon College, Brisbane in 2013.

== Honours and awards ==

Conspicuous Service Cross (CSC)	2007
Australian Active Service Medal	
Afghanistan Medal	
Australian Service Medal	
Defence Long Service Medal with 2 Rosette's	for 25–29 years of service
Australian Defence Medal	
United Nations Medal for UNTAET	(United Nations)
Timor Leste Solidarity Medal	(East Timor)
NATO Medal for ISAF (NATO)	
Infantry Combat Badge	
