= Daniel Kaha =

Israeli footballer

Daniel Kaha דניאל קהא
Personal information
- Full name: Daniel Kaha
- Date of birth: February 12, 1989 (age 37)
- Place of birth: Eilat, Israel
- Position: Attacking midfielder

Youth career
- Maccabi Netanya
- 2007–2008: Hapoel Be'er Sheva

Senior career*
Years	Team	Apps	(Gls)
2008–2009	Bnei Eilat	24	(9)
2009	Maccabi Be'er Sheva	2	(0)
2009–2016	Bnei Eilat	114	(20)
2016	F.C. Be'er Sheva	0	(0)
- * Club domestic league appearances and goals as of 1 January 2016

Daniel Kaha (Hebrew: דניאל קהא; born February 12, 1989) is an Israeli footballer currently playing for F.C. Be'er Sheva, an Israeli Football team.

== Honours ==
- Liga Bet South B (1):
  - 2009-10
