= HMNZS Te Kaha =

Anzac-class frigate of Royal New Zealand Navy

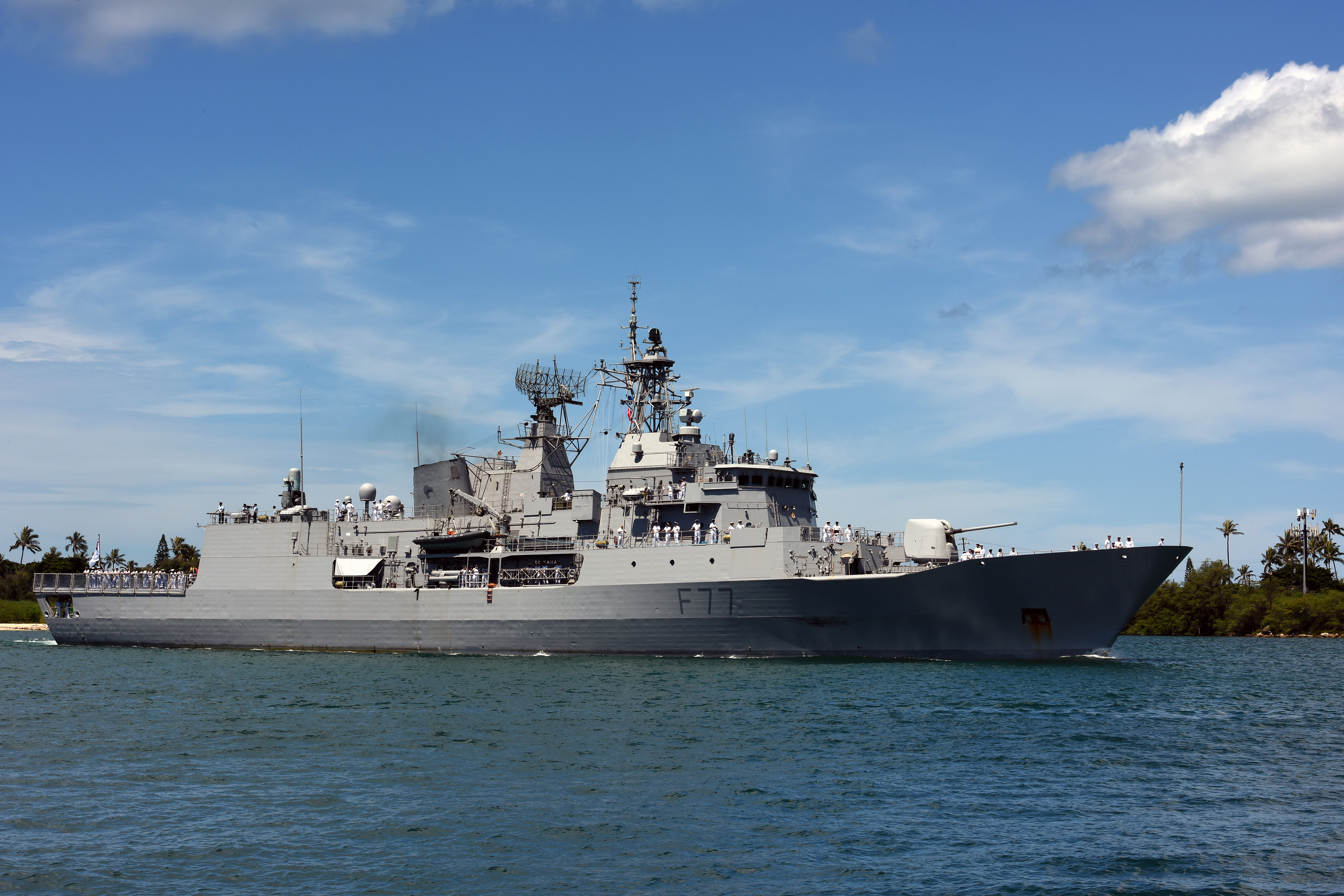
- HMNZS Te Kaha in 2016

History

New Zealand
- Name: HMNZS Te Kaha
- Namesake: Kaha
- Builder: Tenix Defence
- Laid down: 19 September 1994
- Launched: 22 July 1995
- Commissioned: 22 July 1997
- Identification: MMSI number: 512000600; Callsign: ZMBE
- Motto: He Ponanga Kaha (Māori: "Service with strength")
- Honours and awards: Meritorious Unit Commendation (United States)
- Status: Active as of 2026

General characteristics
- Class & type: Anzac-class frigate
- Displacement: 3,600 tonnes full load
- Length: 118 m (387 ft)
- Beam: 15 m (49 ft)
- Draught: 4 m (13 ft)
- Propulsion: 1 × General Electric LM2500+ gas turbine providing 30,000 hp (22,000 kW); 2 × MTU 12V1163 TB83 diesel engines providing 8,840 hp (6,590 kW); two shafts with controllable pitch propellers in CODOG configuration
- Speed: 27+ knots (50+ km/h; 31+ mph)
- Range: 6,000 nautical miles (11,000 km; 6,900 mi) at 18 knots (33 km/h; 21 mph)
- Complement: 178 Officers and ratings (25 Officers, 153 ratings)
- Sensors & processing systems: Sonars: Broadband Sonar Advanced Processing System (BSAPS) for the Spherion B hull-mounted sonar and the TUUM-6 multi-channel Digital Underwater Communication System (DUWCS). Provision for towed array; Air search radar: Thales Group Smart-S Mk2 3d multi-beam naval search radar.; Surface search radar: Thales Group Smart-S Mk2 3d multi-beam naval search radar. Sharpe Eye 2D.; Navigation: Two Furuno 3320 series X band radars.; Infred: Vampir IRST Infred.; Laser: Elbit Systems Laser Warning/Detection.
- Electronic warfare & decoys: ESM: Eibit/Elisra ESM.; Countermeasures: Decoys: G & D Aircraft SRBOC Mk 36 Mod 1 decoy launchers for SRBOC. Rheinmetall MASS. DLF Floating Decoys. Sea Sentor.
- Armament: Guns and missiles: 1 × 5 in/54 (127 mm) Mk 45 Mod 2 gun.; 1 × Phalanx CIWS; 8 × M2 .50 Cal Browning machine guns (2 are Mini Typhoon); 20 GWS.35 VLS cells for Sea Ceptor surface-to-air missiles; AGM-119 Mk 2 Mod 7 Penguin missile launched from SH-2G(I) Super Seasprite; Torpedoes: 2 × triple 324 mm Mk 32 Mod 5 tubes or launched from SH-2G(I) Super Seasprite; Mark 46 torpedo; Fire control: Navantia fire control; Combat data systems: CMS 330 Link 16; Weapons control: CMS 330 Navantia fire control; Fitted for but not with; Not armed with long range anti-ship missiles ie; Harpoon, NSM
- Aircraft carried: One Kaman SH-2G Super Seasprite helicopter

HMNZS Te Kaha (F77) is one of ten Anzac-class frigates, and one of two serving in the Royal New Zealand Navy (RNZN). The name Te Kaha is Māori, meaning 'fighting prowess' or 'strength' (for further information on this term, see Kaha).

== Design and construction ==
During the mid-1980s, the RNZN began considering the replacement of their four Leander-class frigates. Around the same time, a deterioration in New Zealand-United States relations forced the New Zealand government to improve ties with local nations. As the Royal Australian Navy was seeking to replace their River-class destroyer escorts with ships nearly identical to what the RNZN wanted, the two nations decided to collaborate on the acquisition in early 1987. Tenders had been requested in 1986, and 12 ship designs (including an airship) were submitted. By August 1987, these were narrowed down in October to Blohm + Voss's MEKO 200 design, the M class (later Karel Doorman class) offered by Royal Schelde, and a scaled-down Type 23 frigate proposed by Yarrow Shipbuilders. In 1989, the Australian government announced that Melbourne-based shipbuilder AMECON (which became Tenix Defence) would build the modified MEKO 200 design. However, the decision to buy the frigates had been highly controversial in New Zealand, primarily because of the cost of purchasing frigate-type ships, plus the idea that the high-capability warships would be too few and too overspecialised for the fisheries and economic exclusion zone (EEZ) patrols expected to be the RNZN's core operations. Despite ongoing debate, the New Zealand government agreed to purchase two frigates in addition to the RAN's eight, and had an option for two more. This option expired in 1997 without New Zealand exercising it; there were proposals to buy a new or second-hand Anzac outside the terms of the original contract, but a lack of political support stopped this developing, and the number built for the RNZN remained at two. The drop in capability and the issue of tying up the Anzacs on EEZ patrols when they could be deployed more suitably elsewhere were factors leading to the RNZN's Project Protector acquisition program.

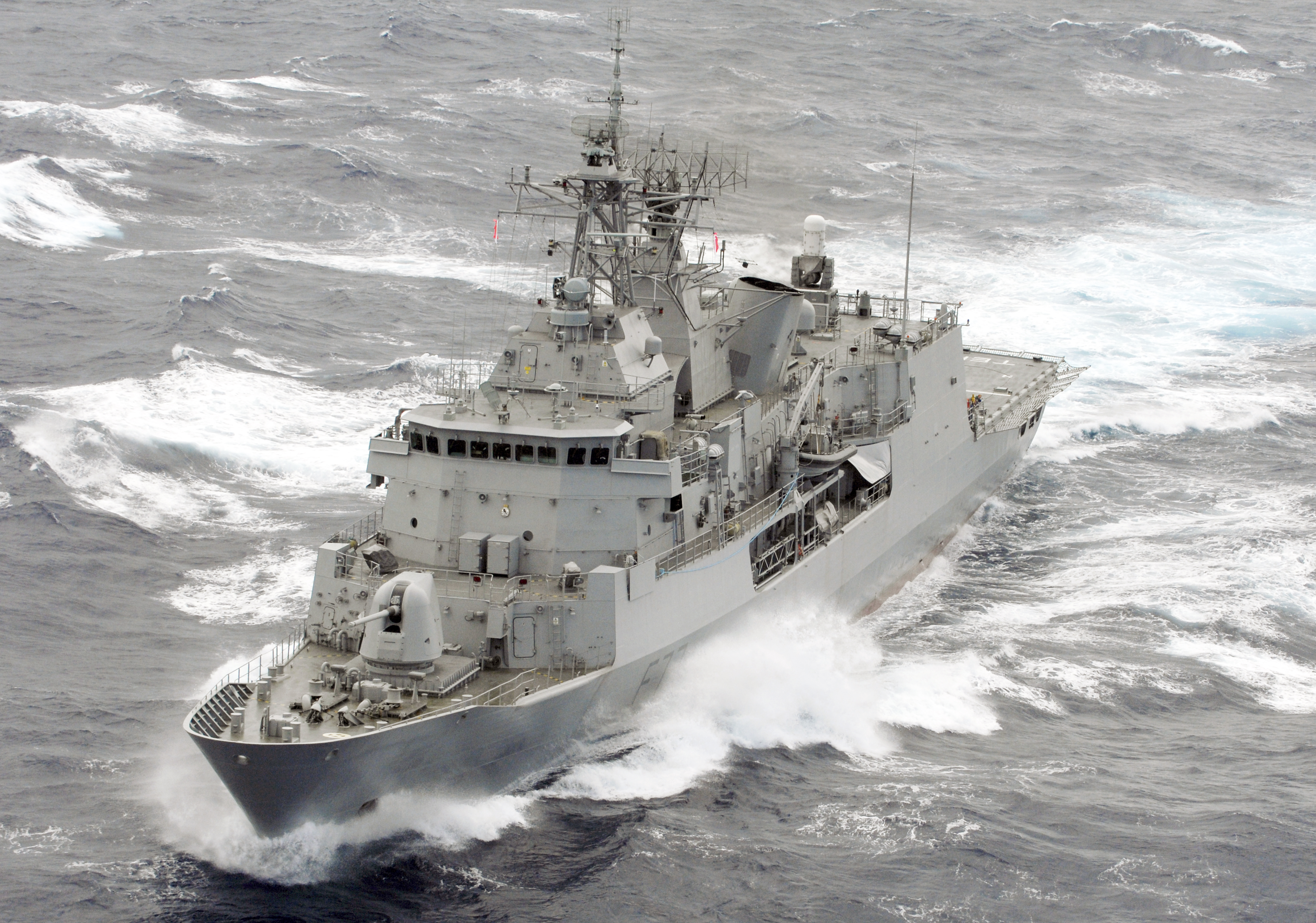
Te Kaha passing through the South China Sea in 2007

The Anzacs are based on Blohm + Voss' MEKO 200 PN (or Vasco da Gama-class) frigates, modified to meet Australian and New Zealand specifications and maximise the use of locally built equipment. Each frigate has a 3,600-tonne (3,500-long-ton; 4,000-short-ton) full load displacement. The ships are 109 metres (358 ft) long at the waterline, and 118 metres (387 ft) long overall, with a beam of 14.8 metres (49 ft), and a full load draught of 4.35 metres (14.3 ft). The ships are fitted with a Combined Diesel or Gas (CODOG) propulsion machinery layout, consisting of two controllable-pitch propellers driven by a single General Electric LM2500-30 gas turbine and two MTU diesel engines: initially the TB83 model, but these were replaced in 2009 with more powerful TB93s. Maximum speed is 27 knots (50 km/h; 31 mph), and maximum range is over 6,000 nautical miles (11,000 km; 6,900 mi) at 18 knots (33 km/h; 21 mph); about 50% greater than other MEKO 200 designs. The standard ship's company of an Anzac consists of 22 officers and 141 sailors.

As designed, the main armament for the frigate is a 5-inch 54 calibre Mark 45 gun, supplemented by an eight-cell Mark 41 vertical launch system for RIM-7 Sea Sparrow surface to air missiles, two 12.7-millimetre (0.50 in) machine guns, and two Mark 32 triple torpedo tube sets firing Mark 46 torpedoes. They were also designed for but not with a close-in weapons system (a Phalanx CIWS installed shortly after the frigate's completion, supplemented by two Mini Typhoons from 2006 onwards), two quad-canister Harpoon missile launchers, and a second Mark 41 launcher (neither of which have been added to the New Zealand ships). The New Zealand Anzacs initially operated with a Westland Wasp helicopter, which were later replaced by Kaman SH-2 Seasprites, then Kaman SH-2G Super Seasprite helicopters.

Te Kaha was laid down at Williamstown, Victoria on 19 September 1994. The ship was assembled from six hull modules and six superstructure modules; the superstructure modules were fabricated in Whangarei, New Zealand, and hull modules were built at both Williamstown and Newcastle, New South Wales, with final integration at Williamstown. She was launched on 22 July 1995, and commissioned into the RNZN on 22 July 1997. In early 2002, microscopic cracks in Te Kaha's bilge keel and hull plating were discovered. This problem, which was common to the first four ships of the Anzac class, was later rectified.

== Operational history ==
In 1999, Te Kaha pursued Patagonian toothfish poachers in the Ross Dependency, participated in the INTERFET multinational deployment to East Timor from 19 to 26 September, and operated as part of the Multinational Interception Force in the Persian Gulf. It was involved in the Solomon Islands conflict during 2000 and 2001, with several periods as guardship at the capital, Honiara.

In 2002, Te Kaha returned to the Persian Gulf, this time as part of Operation Enduring Freedom, after a four-month flag-showing deployment in Asian waters. The frigate was replaced in the Gulf by its sister ship HMNZS Te Mana in early 2003.

In 2010 Te Kaha and the fleet tanker HMNZS Endeavour became the first RNZN ships to visit the USA mainland since the dissolution of the ANZUS treaty. In 2012 Te Kaha attended RIMPAC.

On 16 February 2015, Te Kaha sailed from New Zealand to Gallipoli ahead of the centenary of the landings there during World War I. The frigate then sailed for the Gulf of Oman where she was assigned to anti-piracy patrols. She participated in Exercise Talisman Sabre 2015 in Australia along with the multi-role vessel HMNZS Canterbury and Endeavour, then returned to New Zealand on 2 August 2015.

In June 2017, the ship's deployment in the western Pacific was extended to provide support to the US 7th Fleet after USS Fitzgerald collided with the container ship ACX Crystal, killing seven sailors and causing extensive damage to the destroyer. The frigate directly contributed to the escort of USS Nimitz, an aircraft carrier replacing USS Carl Vinson in the region.

In September 2021 HMNZS Aotearoa and Te Kaha sailed for an international defence exercise in South East Asia and also interact with the United Kingdom’s Carrier Strike Group (CSG) as it conducts engagement activities in the Indo-Pacific region.

=== Refit ===
In March 2018, Te Kaha arrived in Victoria, British Columbia, to undergo a major upgrade of her combat management system to the Lockheed Martin CMS 330, as well as replacing the RIM-7 Sea Sparrow with the new Sea Ceptor surface-to-air missile. The upgrade was expected to cost NZ$639 million. In September 2020, the refit was reportedly complete and the ship began sea trials in preparation for return to active service. In December 2020 Te Kaha completed initial refit upgrades and sea trials and sailed back to Auckland, arriving at Devonport Naval Base on 20 December.

Te Kaha collided with the wharf at Kauri Point Armament Depot in May 2024, suffering minor damage to its bow, which cost $NZ220,000 to repair.

The frigate departed New Zealand on 12 February 2025 for a deployment to the Middle East. On 4 April 2025, Te Kaha conducted a PASSEX with INS Tarkash of the Indian Navy. The exercise concluded New Zealand led-CTF 150 Joint Focused Operation ANZAC Tiger and included cross-deck landings, boarding drills, and manoeuvres to enhance bilateral maritime interoperability and cooperation.

On 7 March 2026, Te Kaha accidentally leaked 200–300 litres (44–66 imp gal; 53–79 US gal) of oil into Akaroa Harbour due to a fault starboard oil cooler. Crew used absorbent pads to clean up surface oil and an inflatable dinghy to disperse the oil.

In March 2026, the ship participated in the Royal Australian Navy's Exercise Kakadu Fleet Review on Sydney Harbour.

=== Honours ===
In November 2018, the US Navy awarded Te Kaha the Meritorious Unit Commendation for supporting the 7th Fleet after the Fitzgerald collision.

== Gallery ==
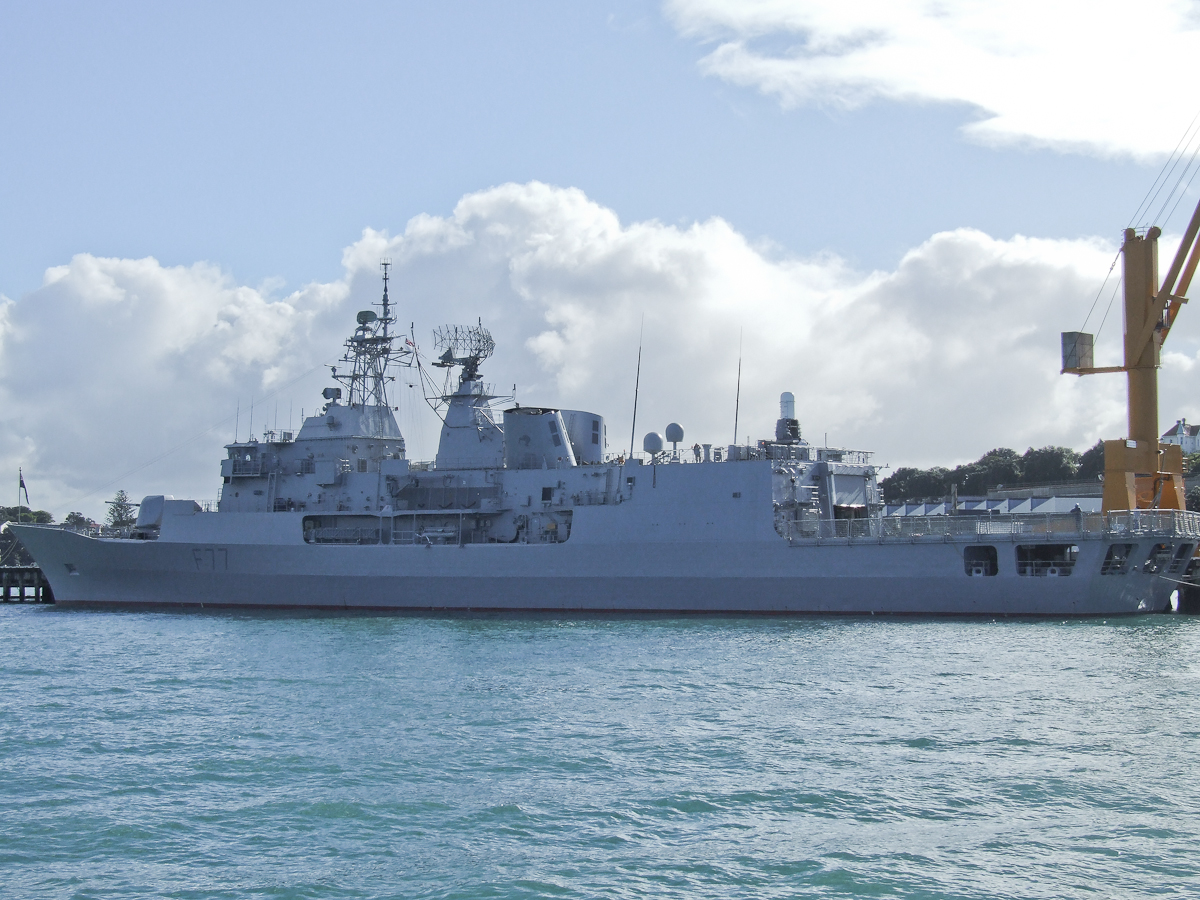
Moored at Devonport Naval Base

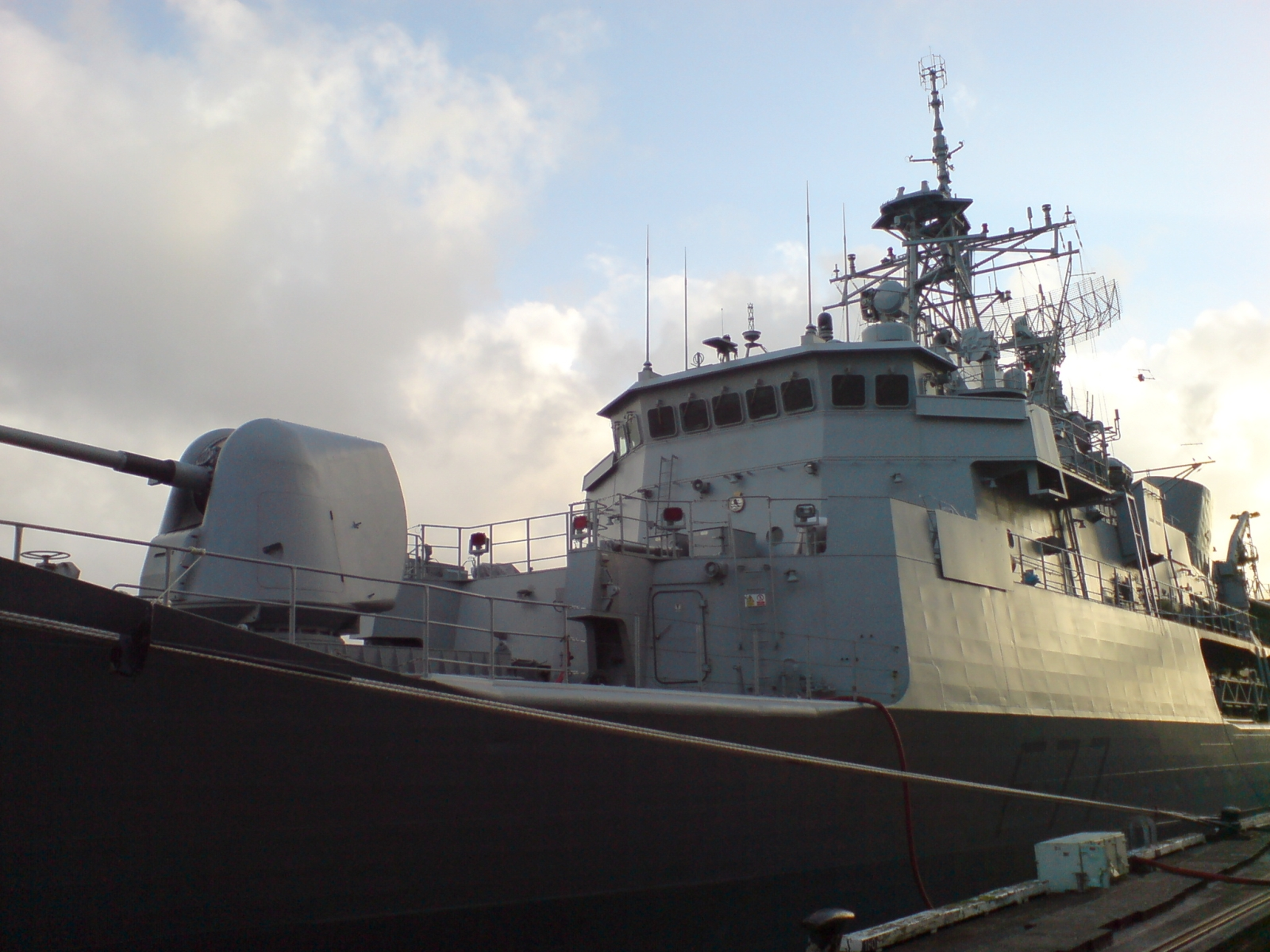
The 5-inch main gun and bridge of Te Kaha

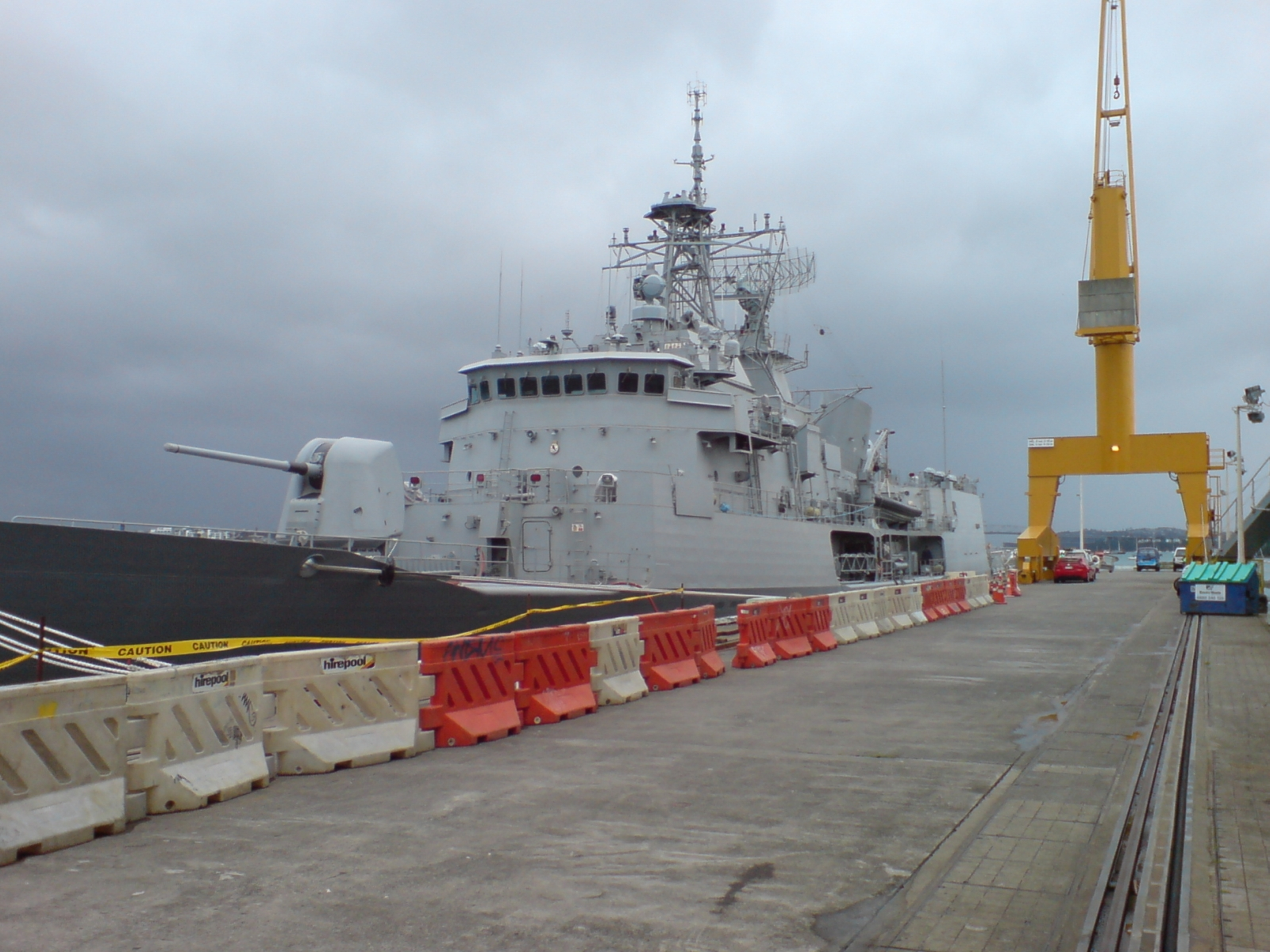
Te Kaha alongside at Devonport in 2008

== See also ==
- Frigates of the Royal New Zealand Navy
