= 2008 East Timorese assassination attempts =

Rebel shooting of the President and Prime Minister

Attempted assassination of José Ramos-Horta and Xanana Gusmão
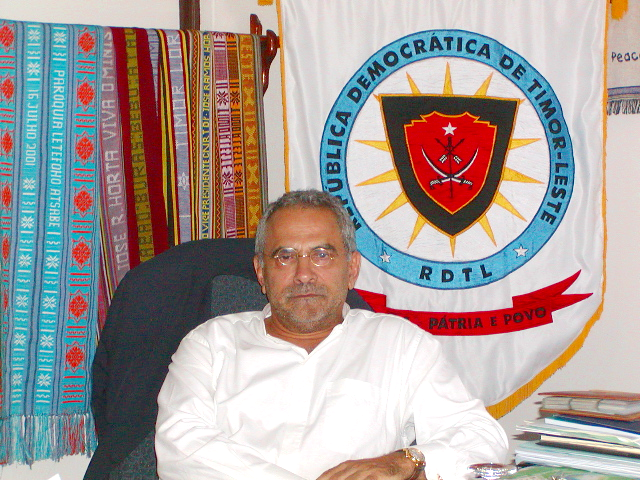
- José Ramos-Horta in 2006
- Location: Dili, East Timor
- Date: February 11, 2008; 18 years ago 6:30 a.m. (UTC +9)
- Target: José Ramos-Horta; Xanana Gusmão
- Attack type: Attempted assassination
- Weapon: Machine gun
- Deaths: 2 (incl. Alfredo Reinado)
- Injuries: Ramos-Horta
- Perpetrators: Alfredo Reinado; Gastão Salsinha
- Motive: Extension of 2006 crisis in Timor-Leste

Rebel soldiers of the Timor Leste Defence Force invaded the homes of the President and Prime Minister of East Timor on 11 February 2008, leading to the shooting and serious wounding of President José Ramos-Horta and the shooting up of the car of Prime Minister Xanana Gusmão. Two rebel soldiers, including leader Alfredo Reinado, were shot dead by presidential security forces. Reinado had deserted the military in 2006 along with 600 others after complaining of regional discrimination in promotions, sparking the 2006 East Timorese crisis. The attacks have been variously interpreted as attempted assassinations, attempted kidnappings and an attempted coup d'état. The rebels' intentions remain unknown.

After being hospitalised in Darwin, Northern Territory, Australia, for more than a month, Ramos-Horta was discharged from hospital on 19 March but remained in Darwin until April for continued treatment.

== Events ==
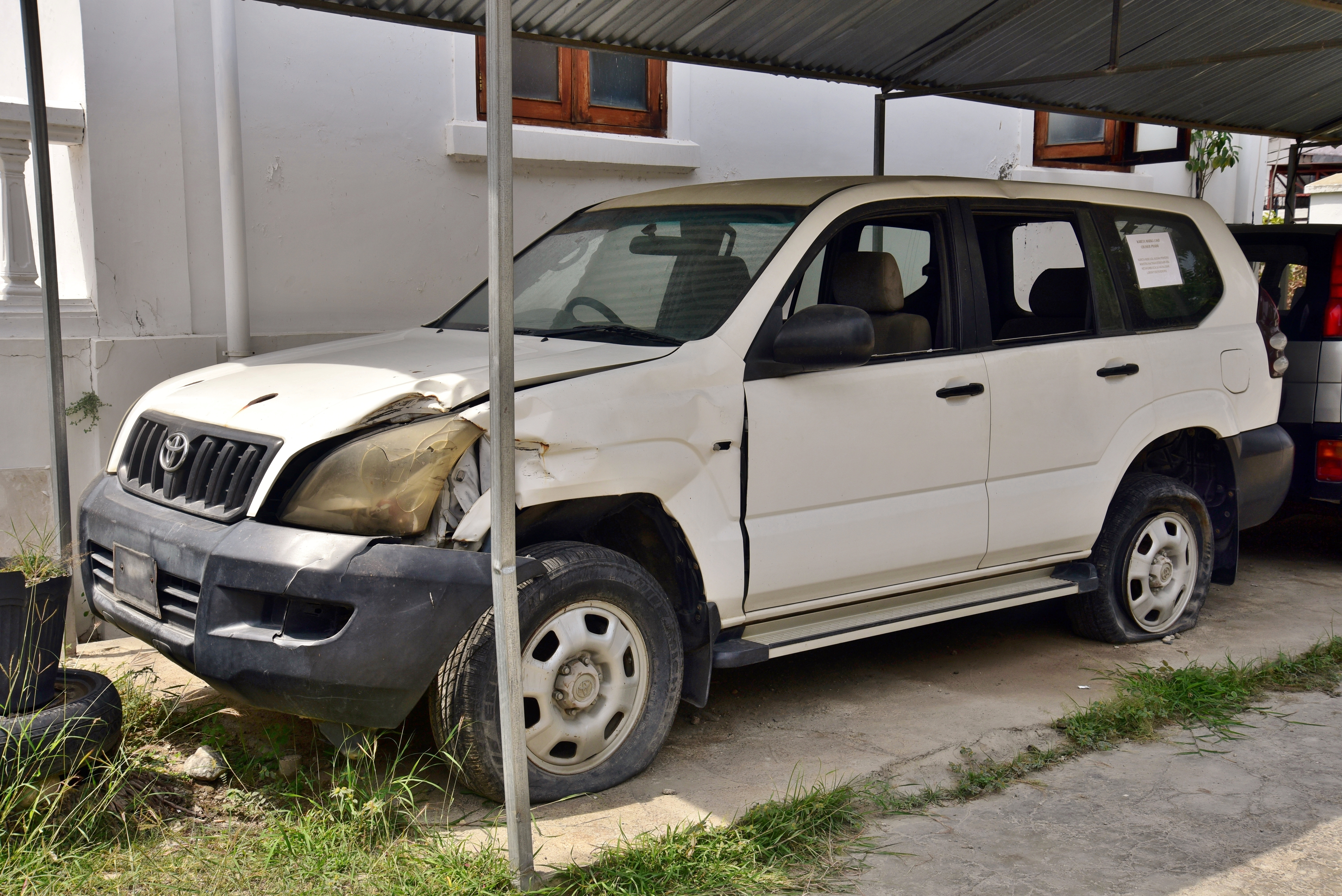
The Toyota Land Cruiser Prado in which Gusmão was riding when attacked, on display at the Xanana Gusmão Reading Room in 2018

Events began before dawn when rebel soldiers led by Alfredo Reinado entered the residential compound of President José Ramos-Horta in the capital Dili. They disarmed the security detail on duty and entered the compound. Ramos-Horta was not there, being out jogging on the beach. The second security team, arriving to relieve the night team, saw Renaido in the house and opened fire, killing him with a shot to the head. Another rebel, Leopoldino Mendonça Exposto, was also killed.

Ramos-Horta was alerted of the gunfight but walked back up the hill to his home. Reinado's men opened fire on him as he approached his home. One of Ramos-Horta's guards pushed in front of him as a human shield. The guard was shot and taken to a hospital in serious condition. The surviving rebels fled the scene.

Prime Minister Xanana Gusmão was alerted to the attack on the presidential home and left his home by car for Dili. A group of rebel soldiers under the command of Lieutenant Gastão Salsinha invaded Gusmão's home, finding Gusmão's wife Kirsty and children but not Gusmão. Another party of rebels shot out the tires of Gusmão's car on its way to Dili, but the car continued for some distance before Gusmão, unhurt, abandoned it and ran into the bush to call for help.

Gusmão declared a 48-hour state of emergency, including a curfew and a ban on conducting meetings or rallies, and described the events as an attempted coup. Ramos-Horta was evacuated to Darwin, Australia, for emergency surgery.

Ramos-Horta had met Reinado several times in the months before the attacks, trying to persuade him to surrender. Their most recent meeting, on the preceding Sunday, was reported to have ended acrimoniously.

== Timeline ==
11 February:

- 6h05 and after: A group of hooded, armed men in two cars with government license plates, led by Alfredo Reinado (the only one not hooded), proceeded to the Díli residence (in Metiaut) of President José Ramos-Horta. According to the UN preliminary investigation, the group consisted of 12 or 13 men in military uniform. About three of them stood at the entrance after having restrained the F-FDTL soldier that guarded the main entrance, and about seven, led by Reinado, went into the residence searching for Ramos-Horta. According to Associated Press, they "jumped from two cars, firing machine guns as they stormed the compound" shouting, "Traitor! Traitor!" They search the residence for Ramos-Horta who is not there.
- 6h30-6h40: A series of continuous gunfire is heard by a neighbour of the President's residence, Fernando Encarnação, according to statements he made to the Portuguese official news agency, LUSA.
- 6h40-6h45: Encarnação phones the UN security and tells them what he has heard. He is told the UN security forces already know of what is happening.
- 6h45-6h50: Encarnação hears a second series of continuous gunfire.
- 6h50-6h59:
  - Reinado is shot dead by the F-FDTL (Timor Leste Defence Force) inside the President's residence. One of his men, Leopoldino Mendonça Exposto, is also killed. According to the UN preliminary investigation, this happened after the F-DTL guard had been woken by a civilian employee warning him that there was a group of hooded men searching the residence for Ramos-Horta. According to Associated Press, the guard who killed Reinado stated: "I shouted Alfredo's name and then opened fire at his head with my machine gun because he was wearing a bulletproof vest," and "I fired many times, I don't know how many times".
  - A 17-year-old niece of Ramos-Horta calls him on his cell phone while he is jogging, warning him that his home was attacked by a group of men.
  - Chris Durman, then GM of ANZ Bank (and referred to elsewhere in other reports as "the diplomat") also warned Ramos-Horta. Durman was cycling in the area, and had attempted to ride towards Ramos-Horta's home. Durman was shot at a number of times, in the area near the "plinth", the concrete pillar at the base of the road to Ramos-Horta's home. Evading gunfire, Durman moved to where he saw Ramos-Horta and two body guards walking on the beach towards the turn off to the home, warning of the issues, and offering to collect his vehicle to take Ramos-Horta out of the area.
- 6h59 and after:
  - Ramos-Horta, "making his way inland", "refused a ride from a passing vehicle and walked up the public road to the house escorted by two bodyguards with pistols", according to Associated Press.
  - Returning to his home, at about 20 m from the main gate in Boulevard John Kennedy, Ramos-Horta is fired upon "by men laying in wait across from the main entrance to the residence". He receives two gunshot wounds in the chest and one in the stomach. According to Associated Press, "during the shooting, an East Timor soldier arrived by car and drove into the line of fire to protect Ramos-Horta, crashing into a signpost and a wooden fence before he too was critically injured". The attackers flee in a vehicle and Ramos-Horta staggers into his house. According to the UN preliminary findings, the fleeing attackers go into the mountains where they join the group that will attack Prime Minister Xanana Gusmão.
  - A phone call is made to the National Operations Center warning about the situation. Immediately two units, one of the East Timorese National Police and another from the UN policy contingent, are sent to the President's house from Becorá, in the outskirts of Díli.
- 7h00: Task-Group Bravo of the Portuguese National Republican Guard is called to the scene.
- 7h00-7h05: According to neighbour Fernando Encarnação, a car of the UN policy contingent arrives at the scene and blocks access to the President's residence. According to Ramos-Horta's brother, Arsénio Ramos-Horta, who was with him at the time, the UN police did not help his wounded brother and prevented access to the residence.
- 7h10: The first ambulance is called to the scene, according to the UN mission.
- 7h11: Task-Group Bravo leaves its barracks for the scene.
- 7h13: Ramos-Horta phones his chief of staff Natália Carrascalão and tells her that he is wounded.
- 7h15: Task-Group Bravo arrives at the residence.
- 7h23: Ramos-Horta is found by elements of Task-Group Bravo near a bamboo fence.
- 7h25: Ramos-Horta, after being assisted by paramedic Jorge Marques of the INEM (Portuguese Medical Emergency Services), is transported by ambulance to the Australian field hospital.
- 7h30 and after: Prime Minister Xanana Gusmão is told by one of his drivers of the attack on President Ramos-Horta. FRETILIN leader Francisco Guterres advises Gusmão to stay in his residence. Gusmão decides to go to Díli.
- 8h30 and after:
  - Gusmão's three car motorcade, having just left his second residence, is attacked by a group led by Gastão Salsinha. Under heavy fire, his security personnel are able to repulse the attackers. One of the motorcade vehicles reportedly left the road and rolled over.
  - Gusmão's residence in Balíbar (30 minutes drive from Díli) is surrounded by an armed group. Gusmão had just left, but his wife Kirsty Sword-Gusmão and their three sons were there. Kirsty Sword-Gusmão phones her husband and realises he is under attack. She told LUSA that the forces led by Gastão Salsinha, who had left the attack on the motorcade, tried to take the weapons from her three security officers.
- 9h15 and after:
  - Units of Task-Group Bravo of the Portuguese National Republican Guard arrive at Gusmão's residence.
  - Sword-Gusmão and her three sons, joined by Gusmão, are safely evacuated by units of the Portuguese National Republican Guard.
- Noon: Gusmão declares a state of emergency for 48 hours in a television broadcast.
- Night:
  - After being assisted in the Australian field hospital, Ramos-Horta is flown to Darwin, Australia, for further medical care.
  - Ramos-Horta arrives in Australia, accompanied by his sister Rosa Carrascalão, in a CareFlight aircraft and is driven under police escort to Royal Darwin Hospital.

== International reactions ==
=== International organisations ===
- United Nations - U.N. Secretary-General Ban Ki-moon condemned the attack on Ramos-Horta as "brutal and unspeakable". Mr. Ban "condemns in the strongest possible terms these unacceptable attacks on the legitimate institutions of the state and calls on the Timorese people to remain calm and refrain from all violent acts".
- European Union - President of the European Commission, José Manuel Durão Barroso, condemned in the strongest terms the attacks against Ramos Horta and Gusmão, stating that the EU "will continue to stand firmly with the democratic institutions and to face together the challenges ahead, helping the Timorese institutions to consolidate democracy and the rule of law and supporting economic and social development".

=== Countries ===
- Australia - Australian Prime Minister Kevin Rudd declared: "What we had apparently are coordinated attacks aimed at assassinating the democratically elected leadership of East Timor, a close friend and partner of Australia.". Australia would send more peacekeeping troops and police to East Timor.
- China - Chinese Foreign ministry spokesman Liu Jianchiao declared in a statement that "The Chinese Government is shocked by the attack on the president of East Timor, Jose Ramos Horta.". "We condemn the attack and hope he will recover as soon as possible. As a friendly neighbour of East Timor, China hopes to see stability in the country and that its people live in happiness." he added.
- New Zealand - Prime Minister of New Zealand Helen Clark expressed "shock" about the assassination attempts. "Jose Ramos-Horta is someone who has been known to me and others in New Zealand for many, many years." Ms. Clark said, adding that "We're deeply distressed at what has happened today. We're thankful he is alive.". New Zealand would send more peacekeeping troops and police to East Timor.
- Portugal - Portuguese Prime Minister José Sócrates manifested the "full solidarity of the Portuguese government with the democratic institutions of Timor-Leste". He stated that Portugal would send additional troops if the U.N. requests so.
- Russia - Russian Ministry of Foreign Affairs released a statement expressing concern over developments in East Timor and called for political stability.
- Sahrawi Arab Democratic Republic - President of the SADR Mohamed Abdelaziz "energetically" condemned "the coward assassination attempt" against Ramos Horta and Gusmão. "The Saharawi Republic, like all democratic nations in the world, remains supportive of the young Republic of Timor Leste, with its President and legitimate government, which is democratically elected by the heroic Timorese people", the message concluded.
- United States - US President George W. Bush condemned the assassination attempt, and added: "Those who are responsible must know that they cannot derail democracy in Timor Leste, and they will be held accountable for their actions.".

== Aftermath of the attacks ==
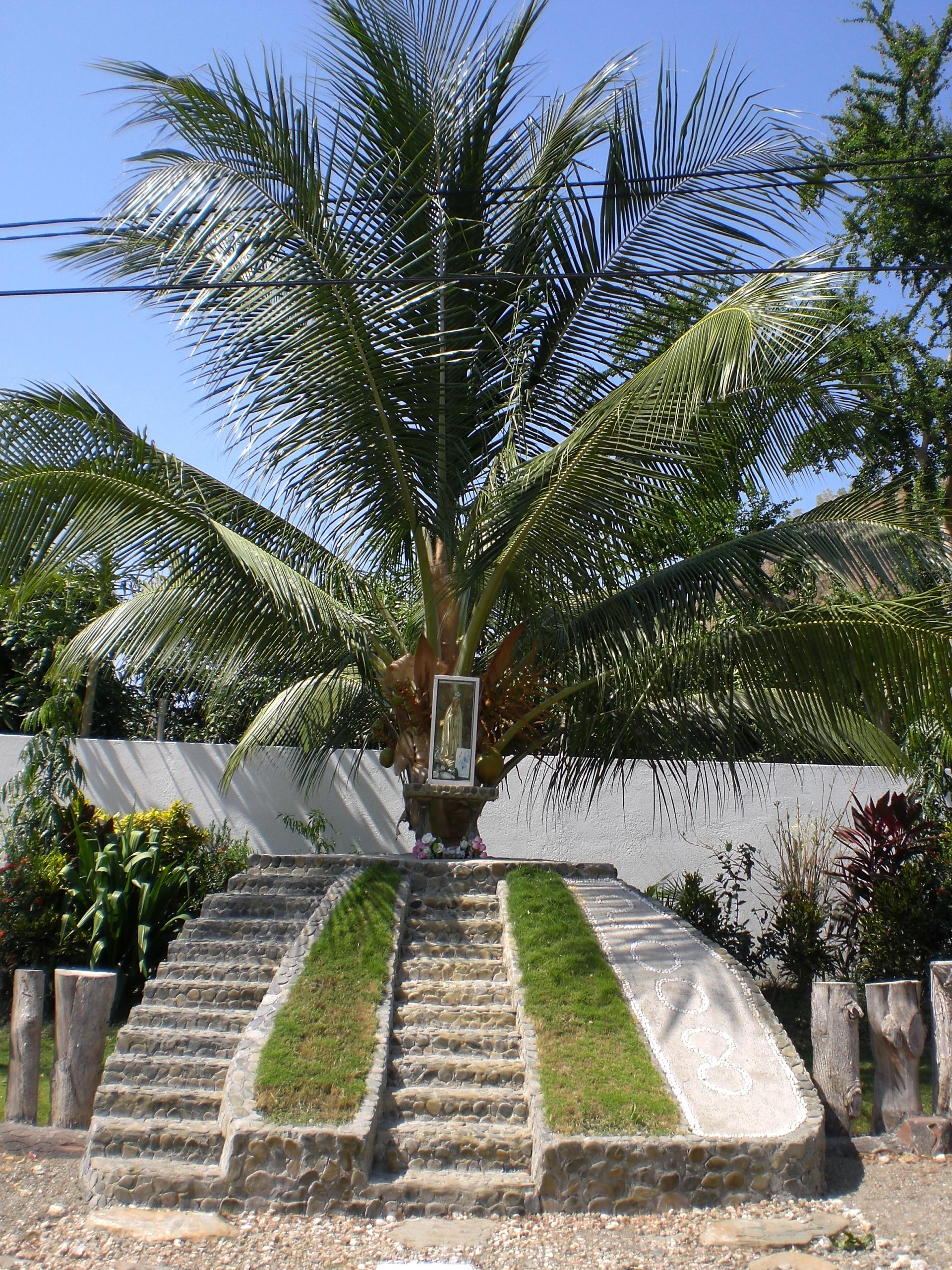
Memorial at the site of the attack on President Ramos-Horta, photographed in 2009

Vicente Guterres, the vice-president of parliament, became acting president following the attacks; he was soon replaced as acting president by Fernando de Araújo, the President of Parliament. Lieutenant Gastão Salsinha said that he had taken over as head of the rebels after Reinado's death and claimed that the attacks were not assassination attempts. According to Salsinha, presidential security started the fighting.

At Gusmão's request, Parliament extended the initial 48-hour state of emergency for ten days on 13 February, with 30 votes in favour and 14 abstaining. On the same day, Prosecutor-General Longinhos Monteiro said that he was about to issue warrants for the arrest of 18 individuals in connection with the attacks, whom he did not name.

Angelita Pires, said to have been Reinado's lawyer, was arrested in Dili on 17 February. Prosecutor-General Monteiro said that Pires was suspected of having information about the attacks because, according to Monteiro, she let Reinado (a wanted man) stay in her home on the night prior to the attacks without notifying the authorities. Three others were also thought to have been arrested in connection with the attacks by the time Pires was arrested, along with more than 200 arrested for violating the emergency laws put in place after the attacks.

Prosecutor-General Monteiro said that Reinado's group had initially intended to merely kidnap Ramos-Horta and Gusmão, but that this plan had failed and that they had therefore switched to their backup plan. Meanwhile, Araújo said that the government would engage in no further dialogue with the rebels and that there was an arrest warrant for Salsinha.

Strong disagreements regarding the events became increasingly visible in the East-Timorese political system: Mário Viegas Carrascalão (former Governor during the Indonesian rule and present President and Deputy of the Social Democratic Party), as well as Mari Alkatiri (former Prime-Minister and Secretary-General of the Revolutionary Front for an Independent East Timor - FRETILIN), have both voiced their doubts on the existence of an attack on Prime Minister Xanana Gusmão. Likewise, Reinado's adoptive father declared to LUSA and to Portuguese television that he had spoken with Salsinha, after the death of his son, and that Salsinha denied that there had been an attack on Gusmão.

On 22 February, Parliament voted to extend the state of emergency by 30 days.

Amaro da Silva Susar, who is said to have participated in the attack on Ramos-Horta, surrendered on 1 March at Turiscai without resistance, saying that he wanted "calm" to return to East Timor. According to da Silva, he participated in the attack but did not actually shoot Ramos-Horta.

In early March, Araujo visited Ramos-Horta in Darwin. He said that Ramos-Horta had forgiven Reinado for the attack and did not understand why Reinado had wanted to kill him. According to Araujo, Ramos-Horta, who had started walking again, was "very lucid, showing his concern for the country and the responsibility of the head of state"; he wanted the people to remain calm and wanted a full investigation to take place.

A message from Ramos-Horta, still recovering in Darwin Private Hospital, was broadcast on 12 March. In this message, he thanked his supporters and Australia and said that he had "been very well looked after". A spokesman said that his condition was improving and that he was taking short daily walks for exercise. Meanwhile, his brother Arsenio Ramos-Horta said that President Ramos-Horta had identified Marcelo Caetano as the man who had shot him. Arsenio said that Caetano had been shot in the 2006 violence and that Ramos-Horta had taken Caetano into his home at that time to help him recover. The President's office declined to confirm this identification due to the ongoing nature of the investigation.

Ramos-Horta was discharged from Royal Darwin Hospital on 19 March, although he said that he would stay in Australia for physical therapy for "a few more weeks". He also said on this occasion that he had remained conscious following the shooting and "remember[ed] every detail", describing how he was taken for treatment. Thanking the hospital staff, he gave them Timorese coffee. The hospital's general manager that he was "inspired" by Ramos-Horta's recovery from such serious injuries, although he said that Ramos-Horta would probably continue to suffer pain from the injuries for a long time.

On 23 March, Parliament extended the state of emergency for another month. On the same day, Ramos-Horta went out in public for the first time since the shooting, visiting St Mary's Catholic Cathedral in Darwin. Meanwhile, Salsinha was reported to be negotiating his surrender in Maubesi. The authorities have placed a priority on obtaining his peaceful surrender, concerned that if he is killed, what he knew about the attacks would be "bur[ied] with him". Four other rebels surrendered on 22 March.

Later in March, Ramos-Horta said in a television interview that it had taken a long time for an ambulance to arrive after he was shot. He also described how he had looked into his attacker's eyes and, seeing that the man was "determined to fire", he "turned and ran" immediately before being shot. According to Ramos-Horta, the UN wasted a critical opportunity to capture the rebels who participated in the attack by failing to surround Dili and close off the exits. Australian Defence Minister Joel Fitzgibbon said in response that Ramos-Horta was "in no position ... to properly judge the timing".

On 17 April, Ramos-Horta returned to Dili from Darwin; he was greeted at the airport by politicians and dignitaries, tens of thousands of citizens lined the road to the airport. He gave an emotional press conference at the airport in which he urged Salsinha and the remaining rebels to surrender; however, despite Salsinha's insistence on surrendering only to Ramos-Horta in person, Ramos-Horta said that he would not go to meet with him for this purpose. He also said at the press conference that Reinado had not had a prearranged meeting at his house on the day of the attack, describing this as a "lie". On his return, Ramos-Horta immediately resumed the Presidency from the acting president de Araújo.

== Reinado death controversy ==
Some months after the attack, questions arose about the government's version of the death of Alfredo Reinado. An autopsy report concluded that Reinado had been shot at "very close range" in the back of the head. It has been suggested that Reinado was executed rather than shot in defence.

== See also ==
- 2006 East Timorese crisis
