= Kia kaha =

Māori-language phrase

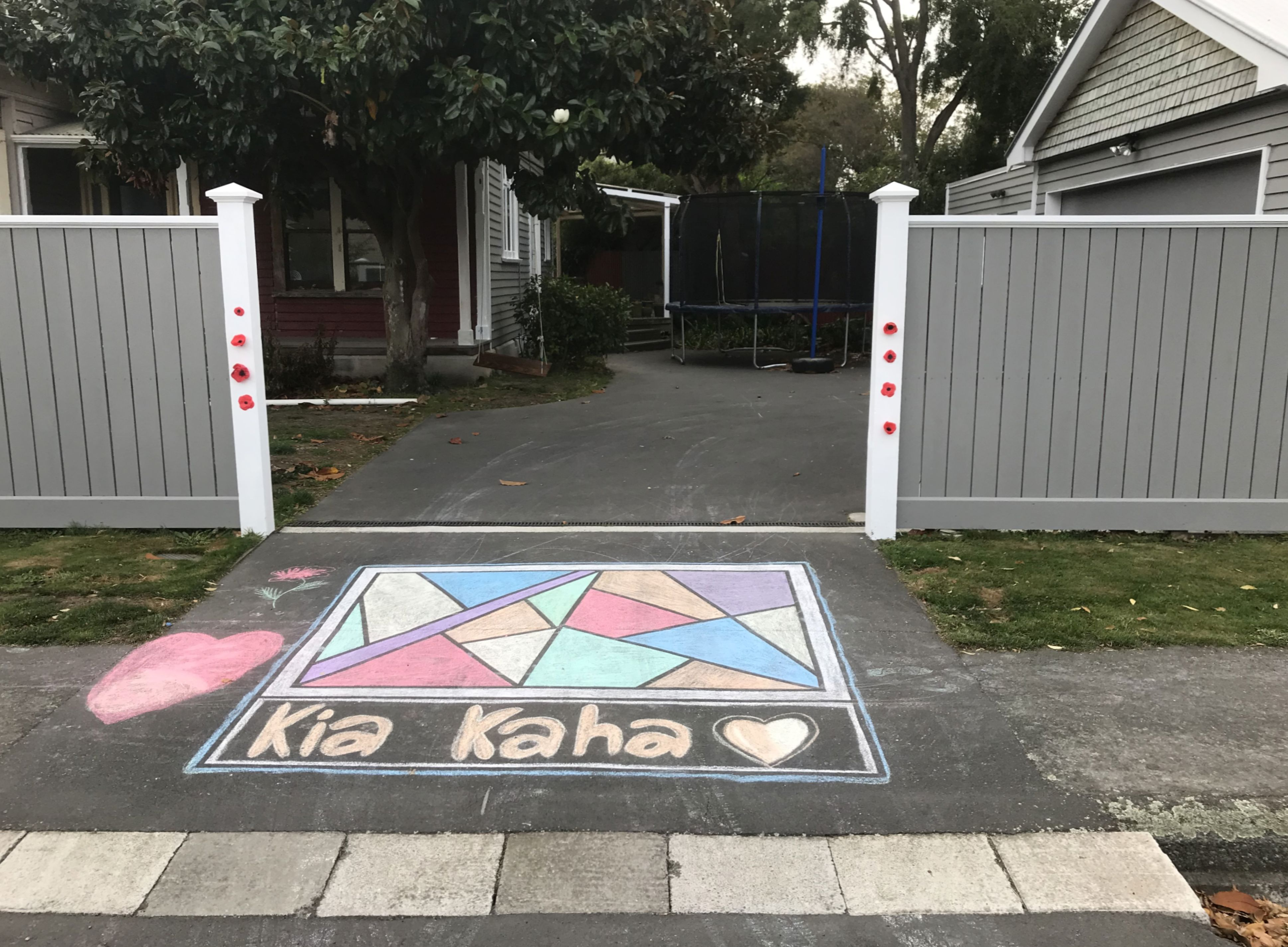
Street art from ANZAC Day 2020, which fell during the COVID-19 pandemic in New Zealand

Kia kaha is a Māori phrase used by the people of New Zealand as an affirmation, meaning stay strong. The phrase has significant meaning for Māori: popularised through its usage by the 28th Māori Battalion during World War II, it is found in titles of books and songs, as well as a motto.

Linguistically, "kia kaha" consists of the desiderative verbal particle kia, used here as 'an encouragement to achieve the state named', that is, to achieve kaha or strength. Kaha derives from Proto-Polynesian *kafa, meaning "strong" or "great"; *kafa is also the Proto-Polynesian term for sennit rope (e.g. Hawaiian: ʻaha), a strong rope made from coconut fibres and used for lashing canoes, weapons, and buildings together.

== Usage ==
The phrase is used in several different contexts. It is a term of comfort or solace (an equivalent of be strong – my thoughts are with you), or (less often) it can serve a similar function to 'kia ora' – an interjection during a speech to indicate support or approval (similar to hear! hear!). It is sometimes seen used as a valediction at the bottom of messages.

== In popular culture ==
=== In the media ===
The phrase "Kia kaha" is prominently used in New Zealand's most famous military song, the Marching Song of the 28th Māori Battalion. The phrase has been used for the title of a song by Split Enz and a book, Kia Kaha: New Zealand in the Second World War by historian John Crawford. Other songs to use Kia kaha as part of their titles include "Kia Kaha Nga Iwi" (Be strong, o tribes), by Ngoi Pewhairangi.

=== In rugby union ===
In 1884 the first New Zealand rugby union team to visit Sydney performed a war cry described by The New Zealand Herald as "the New Zealand football cry, 'Ake, ake, ake, ake, kia kaha' (for ever, for ever keep up your courage; go on with vigour.)"

=== In athletics ===
Steven Adams, starting centre for the Oklahoma City Thunder wore Kia Kaha on the back of his jersey, as a part of the 2019–2020 NBA season restart.

=== In product names and campaigns ===
Kia kaha has been used as the name of various products, most notably a clothing manufacturer. It is also the official name of the New Zealand Police's school anti-bullying campaign.

=== As a motto ===
It was adopted as a part of the motto by the Royal Air Force's No. 75 Squadron in World War II and was transferred to the newly formed No. 75 Squadron RNZAF just after the war ended. Ake ake kia kaha translates as 'ake ake' meaning '(for)ever and (for)ever' and 'kia kaha' meaning 'be strong'. Ake! Ake! Kia Kaha E! was the marching song of the New Zealand Army's 28th (Māori) Battalion.

Numerous schools use Kia kaha as, or as part of, their mottoes, including Te Aute College, Hawke's Bay (Whakatangata kia kaha); Tikipunga High School, Whangārei (Kia kaha, kia maia, kia manawanui); Golden Bay High School, Tākaka (Ake ake kia kaha); Rotorua Intermediate School, Rotorua (Kia kaha, kia maia); and Rosehill Intermediate School, Papakura (Whaia kia kaha) and Te Awamutu Te Awamutu College, Kingwood Park High school and Richmond Primary School (Kia Kaha).

Queen Alexandra's Mounted Rifles (QAMR), an armoured regiment based at Waiouru, also uses Ake Ake Kia Kaha as its motto.

Kia kaha is also used in the film Forever Strong, and is the motto of the Highland High School rugby team which features in the film.

=== Christchurch Earthquake ===
When the 6.3 magnitude earthquake hit the New Zealand city of Christchurch on 22 February 2011, following 4 September 2010 earthquake, Kia Kaha became the iconic phrase used by family and friends supporting the city in their time of need. The New Zealand Herald reported the use of the phrase by Prince William at a memorial service on 18 March 2011 "drew applause and tears from tens of thousands of mourners".

=== Christchurch mosque shootings ===
Kia Kaha was used by the Duke and Duchess of Cambridge and the Duke and Duchess of Sussex in their statements after the Christchurch mosque shootings.

Prince William used the term twice after the Christchurch tragedy.
