= Gastão Salsinha =

East Timorese soldier

Lieutenant Gastão Salsinha was the de facto leader of the East Timor rebel movement following the death of former leader Major Alfredo Reinado.

== Earlier background ==
Salsinha was a member of the East Timorese resistance force, FALINTIL, during the Indonesian occupation until 1999. Following the achievement of independence in 2002 he became a Lieutenant in the new Timor Leste Defence Force, the F-FDTL, and trained under the Australian Defence Force.

== Factional activities and support ==
On 4 May 2006, he deserted the F-FDTL with rebel leader Major Alfredo Reinado and others claiming political discrimination within the armed forces. He initially led the rebel movement but was later an active leader serving under Reinado to oppose the elected government claiming that it fell short of the ideals of the independence movement and that the struggle for "true independence" must continue.

Salsinha is a leading figure in Colimau 2000. Colimau 2000 is one of a number of quasi political or religious organisations, notably based around former FALINTIL veterans. These include the Sagrada Familia, the Popular Committee for Defence of the Democratic Republic of Timor-Leste (CPD-RDTL), Colimau 2000, and the Isolados (individuals). Colimau 2000, CPD-RDTL and Sagrada Familia are also linked to former 1999 militia members, while Colimau 2000 members were alleged to be involved in the violence and destruction in Dili in April 2006 and in an internecine attack on a rival youth group in the village of Estado near Ermera in November 2006.

There appears to be some popular support for Salsinha in certain western regions through Colimau 2000 but he has little influence elsewhere. Former parliamentarian Leandro Isa'ac, who spent months with the rebel soldiers in 2007, refers to Salsinha as a 'bishop' of the 'pagan church of Colimau 2000', which has followers among poor people throughout western regions.

== Events of 11 February 2008 and aftermath ==
Salsinha was involved in the failed 11 February 2008 coordinated assassination attempts on Prime Minister Xanana Gusmão and President José Ramos-Horta although he denied the intent to actually kill the President. Major Reinado led the attack on José Ramos-Horta and was killed by Ramos-Horta's personal security guards. Lt. Salsinha led the simultaneous attack on Xanana Gusmão but was able to escape to the Ermera region where he has support.

Following the attack Salsinha went into hiding to avoiding an arrest warrant for the attempted assassination of Xanana Gusmão and declared himself to be the new leader of the rebels. The western mountains of East Timor are extremely rugged and suffer from very poor transport and communications, making capture difficult despite the small area in which he could operate with local support. Following a lengthy period of difficult and delicate talks in Ermera between Salsinha and the Prosecutor-General, Longuinhos Monteiro, aimed at securing a peaceful and face saving surrender, Salsinha and eleven other rebels surrendered at the Prime Minister's Office, Palacio do Governo, Dili on Tuesday 29 April 2008, not "to the Government but to justice".

Following a seven-month trial in Dili presided over by a three judge panel Lt. Gastão Salsinha was found guilty of conspiracy and attempted murder over the assassinations attempts of the President and Prime Minister and was sentenced to ten years and eight months in prison. Twenty-four other rebels, mostly former soldiers and police who became rebels and fugitives after factional rivalries led to violence in 2006, received up to sixteen years in prison.

On 12 April 2010, President José Ramos Horta publicly announced that he intended to pardon Gastão Salsinha and his men during 2010, arguing that they were eligible to be pardoned as they were also victims of the 2006 military crisis.

== See also ==
- 2008 East Timorese assassination attempts
