= Military equipment of Timor-Leste =

The Timor-Leste Defence Force uses a range of equipment.

== Land Component ==
=== Weapons ===
Image	Model	Origin	Type	Caliber	Variant	Notes
Pistols
	M1911 pistol	United States	Semi-automatic pistol	.45 ACP	M1911A1	50 units were reported
	Glock 19	Austria	Semi-automatic pistol	9×19mm Parabellum	Glock 19	
	Glock 23	Austria	Semi-automatic pistol	9×19mm Parabellum	Glock 23	Delivered on 7 February 2025.
	Glock 19	Austria	Semi-automatic pistol	9×19mm Parabellum	Glock 45	
Submachine gun
	Pindad PM2	Indonesia	Submachine Gun	9x19mm NATO	PM2 V1	75 units Delivered on 2012, Utilized by the National Police of Timor-leste special forces
Assault rifles, Battle rifles
	M16 rifle	United States	Assault rifle	5.56×45mm NATO	M16A1 & M16A2	1,560 units
	M4 carbine	United States	Assault rifle, Carbine	5.56×45mm NATO	M4A1	Also utilized by the Timor Leste Marine Force units
	Heckler & Koch HK33	Germany	Assault rifle, Carbine	5.56×45mm NATO	HK33	Utilized by the Unidade Falintil special forces, some units potentially transferred from the National Police of Timor-Leste special forces
	Heckler & Koch G36	Germany	Assault rifle	5.56×45mm NATO	G36K	Utilized by the Unidade Falintil special forces, some units potentially transferred from the National Police of Timor-Leste special forces
	Steyr AUG	Austria	Assault rifle	5.56×45mm NATO	AUG A1	Utilized by the Unidade Falintil special forces, some units potentially transferred from the National Police of Timor-Leste special forces
	FN FNC	Belgium	Assault rifle	5.56×45mm NATO	Mk 2	Utilized by the Unidade Falintil special forces, some units potentially transferred from the National Police of Timor-Leste special forces
	FN F2000	Belgium	Assault rifle	5.56×45mm NATO	F2000 Tactical	Utilized by the Unidade Falintil special forces, some units potentially transferred from the National Police of Timor-Leste special forces
Designated marksman and sniper rifles
	M14 rifle	United States	Designated marksman rifle	7.62×51mm NATO	M14 DMR	8 units were reported
	SVD rifle	Soviet Union	Sniper Rifle	7.62x51mm NATO	SVD	6 units were reported
Machine guns
	FN Minimi	Belgium	Light machine gun	5.56×45mm NATO	Minimi	150 units acquired
	M249 Squad Automatic Weapon	United States	Light machine gun	5.56×45mm NATO	M249	Delivered on 7 February 2025.
	M60	United States	General-purpose machine gun	7.62×51mm NATO	M60E6	Delivered on 7 February 2025.
Grenade launchers
	M203 grenade launcher	United States	Grenade launcher	40 mm grenade	M203	

=== Utility vehicles ===
Image	Model	Origin	Type	Variant	In Service	Notes
	Toyota Land Cruiser (J70)	Japan	1-ton utility vehicle	Pickup	Unknown	
	Weststar GS Cargo Truck	Malaysia	1-ton utility vehicle	Pickup	10	Delivered on 10 June 2014.
	Isuzu F-Series	Japan	utility truck	Cargo truck	18	18 units delivered on 4 July 2024.
	DefTech Handalan Truck	Malaysia	utility truck	Handalan I	9	9 units were delivered on 17 February 2013.

== Naval Component ==
Current vessels	Origin	Class	Type	Notes
NRTL Jaco	China	Jaco	Patrol boat	Commissioned June 2010
NRTL Betano	China	Jaco	Patrol boat	Commissioned June 2010
NRTL Dili	South Korea	40-ton	Patrol boat	Commissioned 26 September 2011
NRTL Hera	South Korea	40-ton	Patrol boat	Commissioned 26 September 2011
Former vessels	Origin	Class	Type	Notes
NRTL Oecusse (P101)	Portugal	Albatroz	Patrol boat	ex NRP Albatroz (P 1012), transferred in 2002
NRTL Atauro (P102)	Portugal	Albatroz	Patrol boat	ex NRP Atauro (P 1163), transferred in 2002
NRTL Kamenassa (P217)	South Korea	Chamsuri	Patrol boat	Commissioned 26 September 2011; sunk as a dive wreck 15 July 2023

== Light Air Component ==
=== Aircraft ===
Image	Model	Origin	Type	Variant	In Service	Notes
Fixed-wing aircraft
	Cessna 172	United States	Utility aircraft	172P	1	4W-FAT
	Cessna 206	United States	Utility aircraft	Turbostationary 206H	1	4W-FAM
