= Military ranks of Timor-Leste =

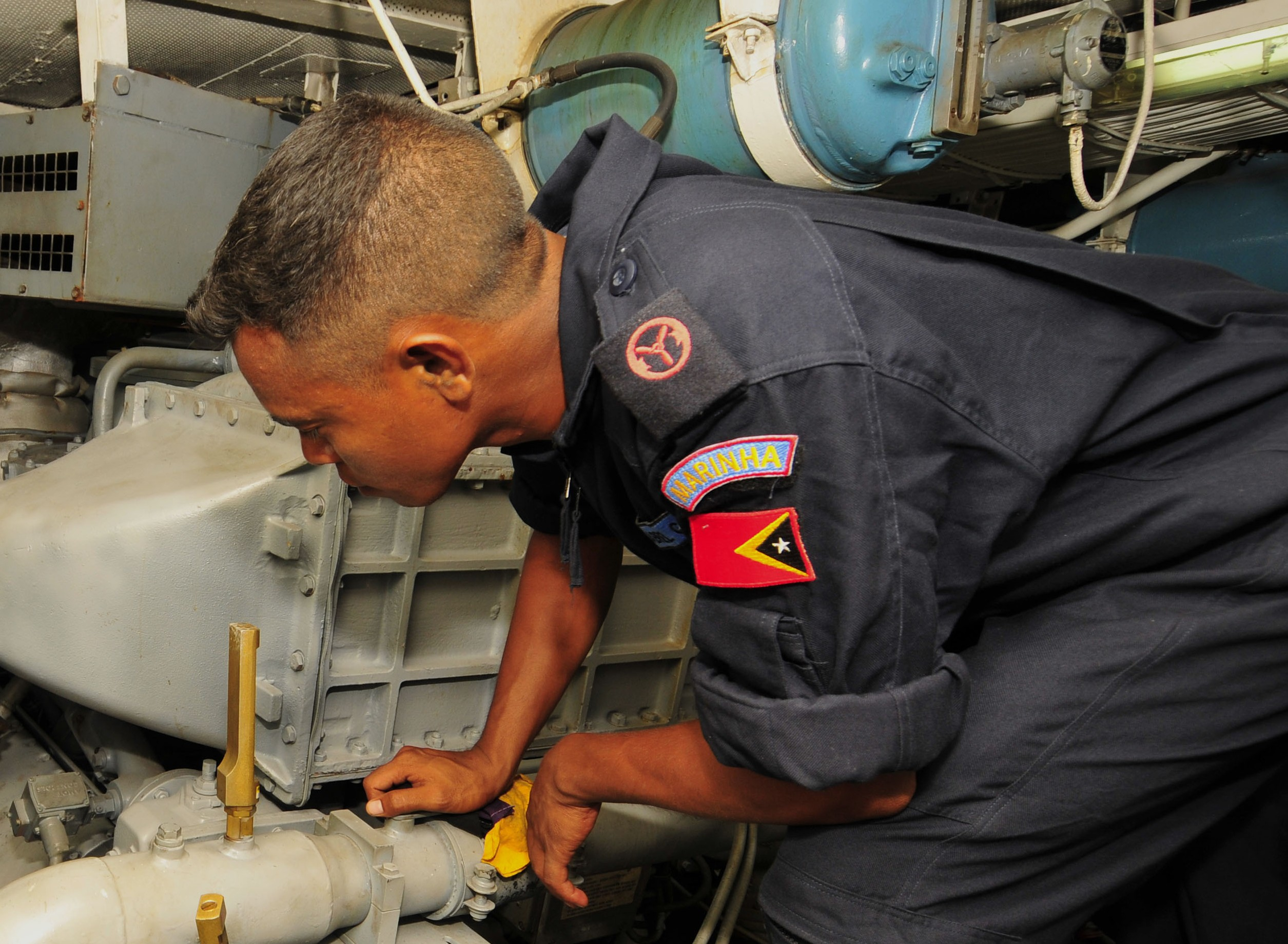
Grumete in the NRTL Kamenassa

The Military ranks of Timor-Leste are the military insignia used by the Timor-Leste Defence Force. Being a former colony of Portugal, Timor-Leste shares a rank structure similar to that of Portuguese Armed Forces.

== Commissioned officer ranks ==
The rank insignia of commissioned officers.

Rank group	General / flag officers			Senior officers			Junior officers
Timor-Leste Army
Timor-Leste Army	Tenente-general	Major-general	Brigadeiro-general	Coronel	Tenente-coronel	Major	Capitão	Tenente	Alferes
Tetun	Tenente Jenerál	Maijór Jenerál	Brigadeiru Jenerál	Koronel	Tenente Koronel	Maijór	-	Tenente	-
Timor-Leste Navy
Timor-Leste Navy			Comodoro	Capitão de Mar e Guerra	Capitão de Fragata	Capitão-tenente	Primeiro-tenente	Segundo-tenente	Guarda-marinha
Timor-Leste Air Component
Timor-Leste Air Component				Coronel	Tenente-coronel	Major	Capitão	Tenente	Alferes

=== Student officer ranks ===
Rank group	Student officer
Timor-Leste Navy
Timor-Leste Navy	Aspirante

== Other ranks ==
The rank insignia of non-commissioned officers and enlisted personnel.

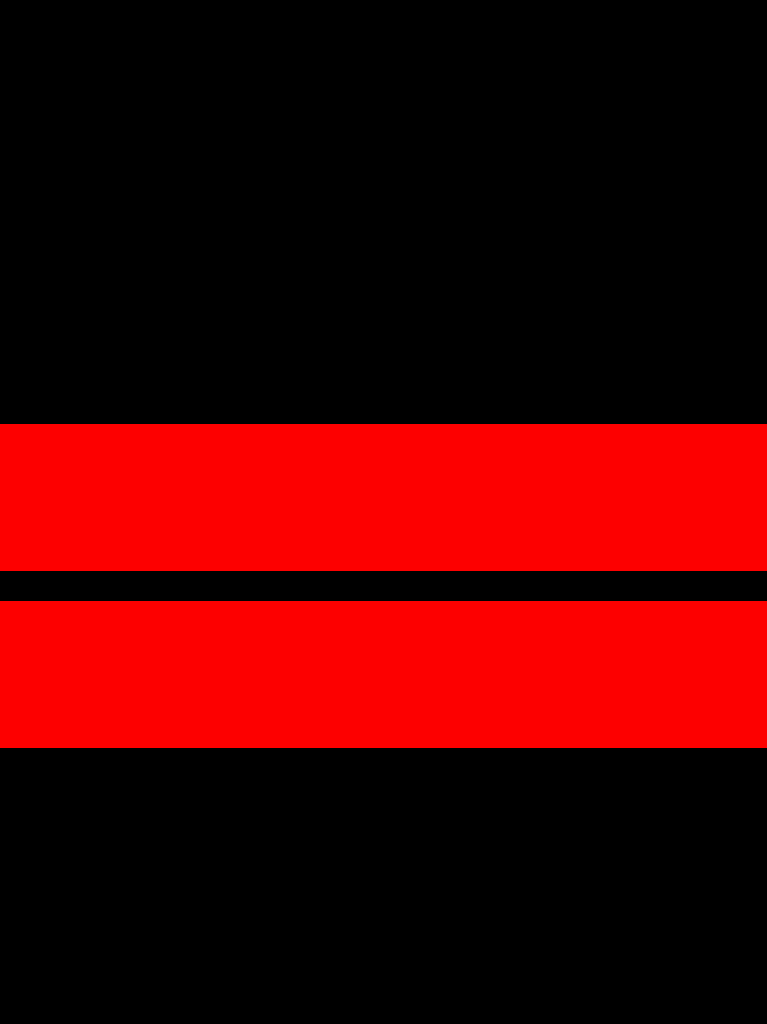
Rank group	Senior NCOs					Junior NCOs	Enlisted
Timor-Leste Army
Timor-Leste Army	Sargento-mor	Sargento-chefe	Sargento-ajudante	Primeiro-sargento	Segundo-sargento		Primeiro-cabo	Soldado
Tetun	Sarjentu-mor	Sarjentu-xefe	Sarjentu-adjuntu	Primeiru-sarjentu	Segundu-sarjentu		Primeiru-kabu	Soldadu
Timor-Leste Navy								Trade insignia in red on a black backing
Timor-Leste Navy	Sargento-mor	Sargento-chefe	Sargento-ajudante	Primeiro-sargento	Segundo-sargento		Primeiro-cabo	Grumete
Timor-Leste Air Component
Timor-Leste Air Component	Sargento-mor	Sargento-chefe	Sargento-ajudante	Primeiro-sargento	Segundo-sargento		Primeiro-cabo	Soldado

== Former ranks ==
Rank group	Senior NCOs							Junior NCOs		Enlisted
Timor-Leste Army
Timor-Leste Army	Sargento-mor	Sargento-chefe	Sargento-ajudante	Primeiro-sargento	Segundo-sargento	Furriel	Segundo-furriel		Cabo-adjunto	Primeiro-cabo	Segundo-cabo	Soldado
Timor-Leste Navy												Trade insignia in red on a black backing
Timor-Leste Navy	Sargento-mor	Sargento-chefe	Sargento-ajudante	Primeiro-sargento	Segundo-sargento	Primerio-subsargento	Segundo-subsargento	Cabo	Primeiro-marinheiro	Segundo-marinheiro		Grumete

== Gallery ==
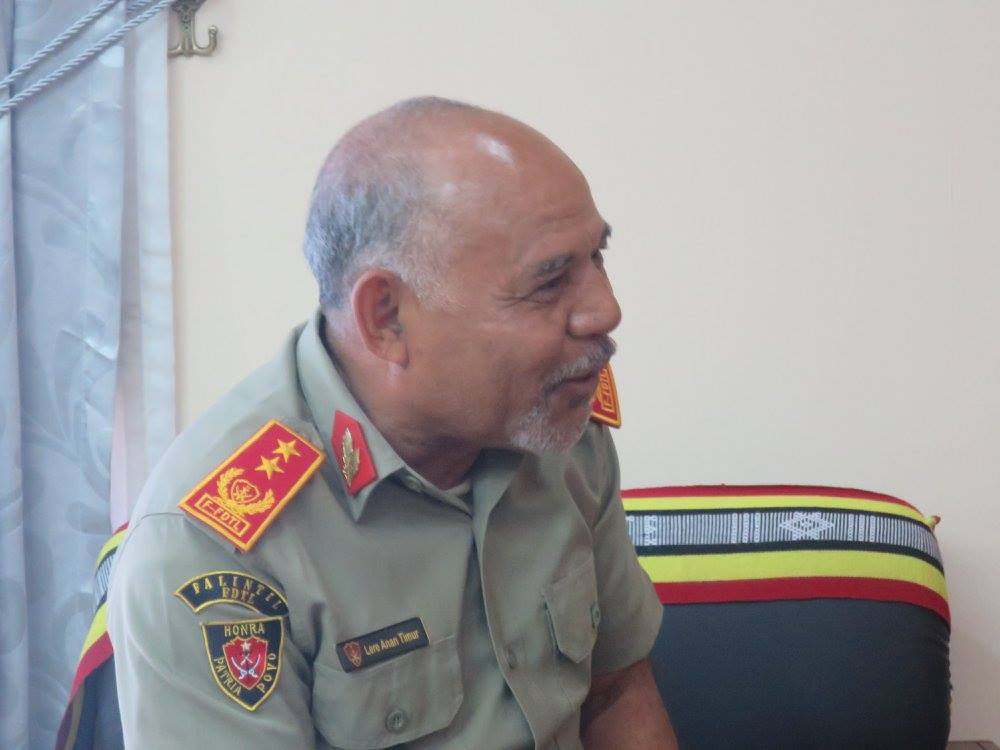
Major-general Lere Anan Timor (2017)

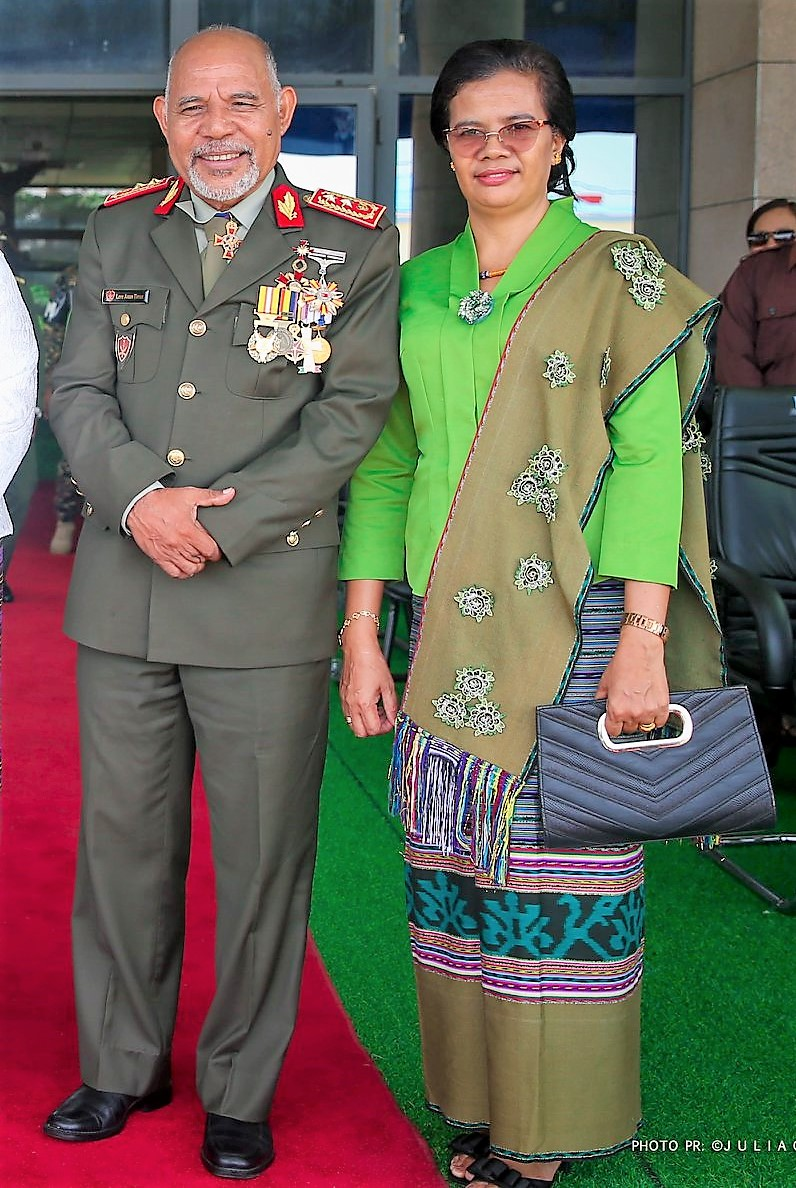
Major-general Lere Anan Timor (2020)

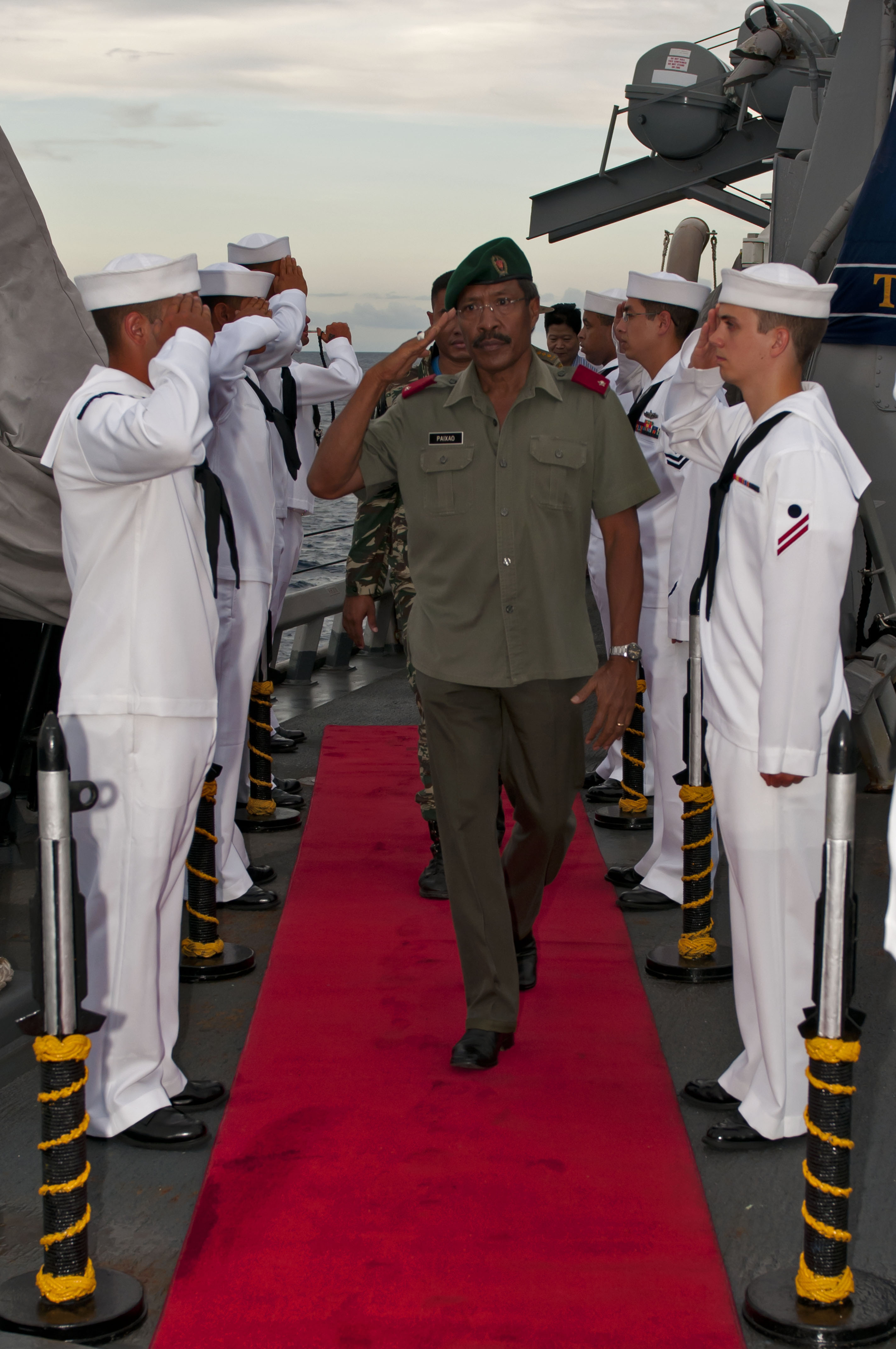
Brigadeiro-general Filomeno da Paixão, Vice Chief of Defence Force, aboard a visiting US warship (2011).

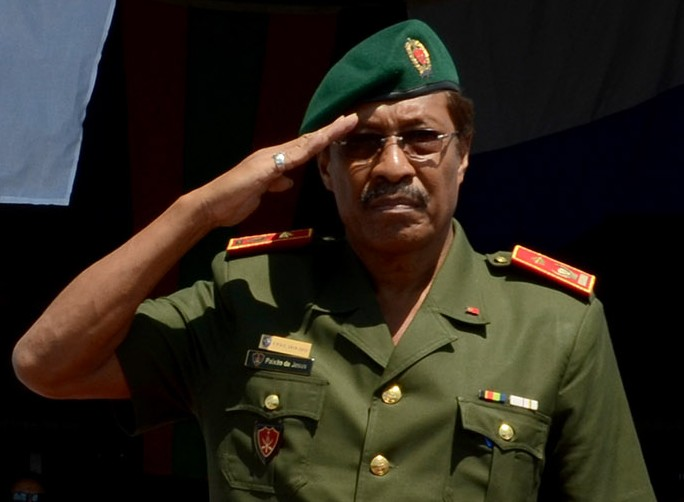
Brigadeiro-general Filomeno Paixão (2014)

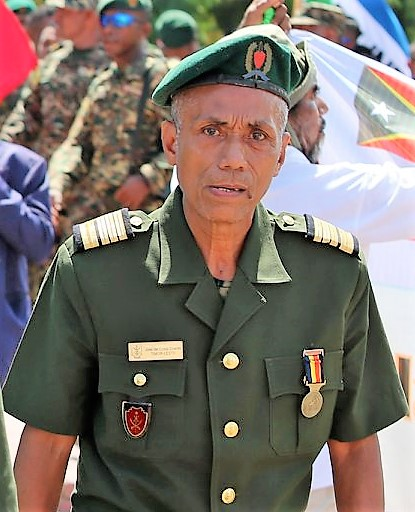
Coronel José da Costa Soares Trix (2017)

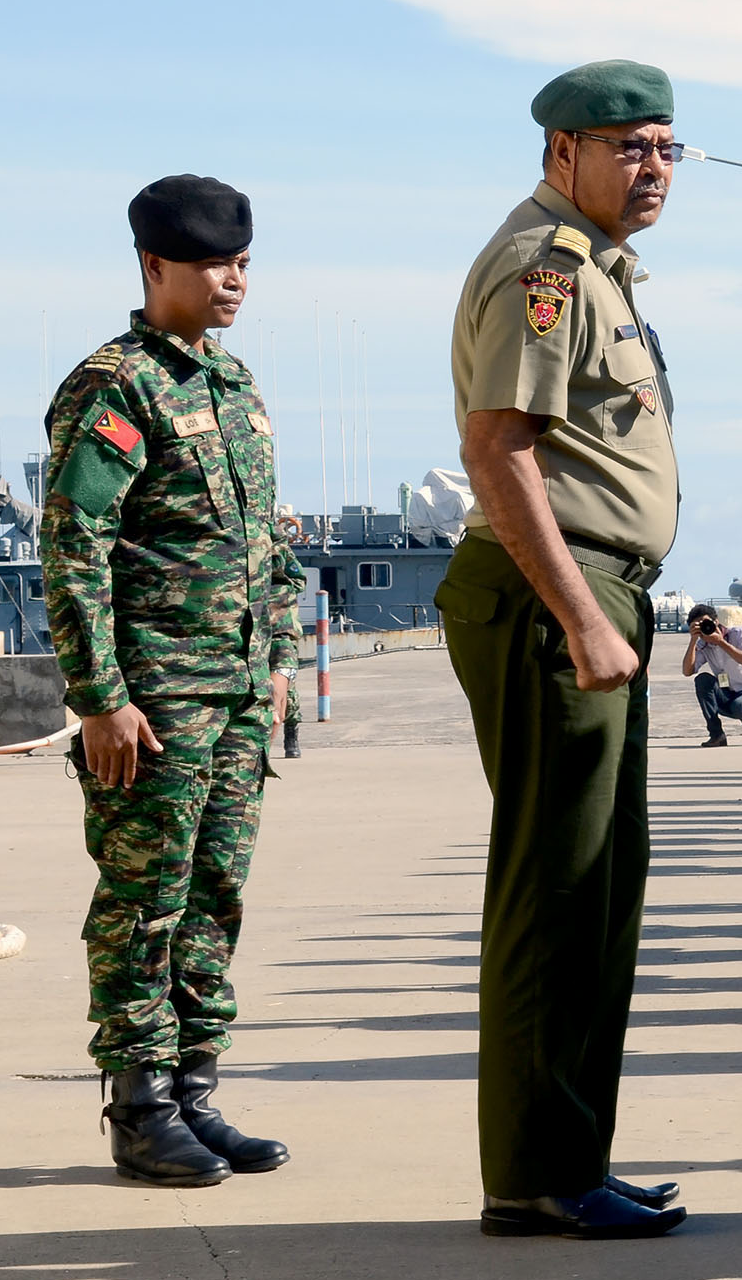
Coronel Falur Rate Laek and Primeiro-tenente of the Naval component (2014)

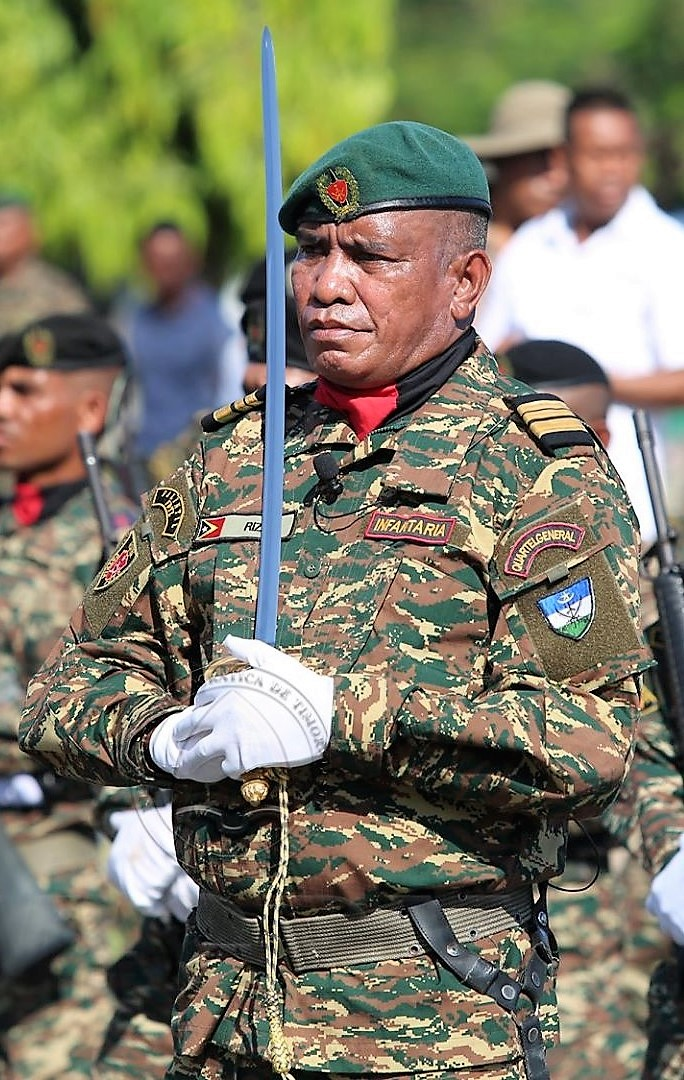
Tenente-Coronel Marcelino Ximenes Rizai (2019)

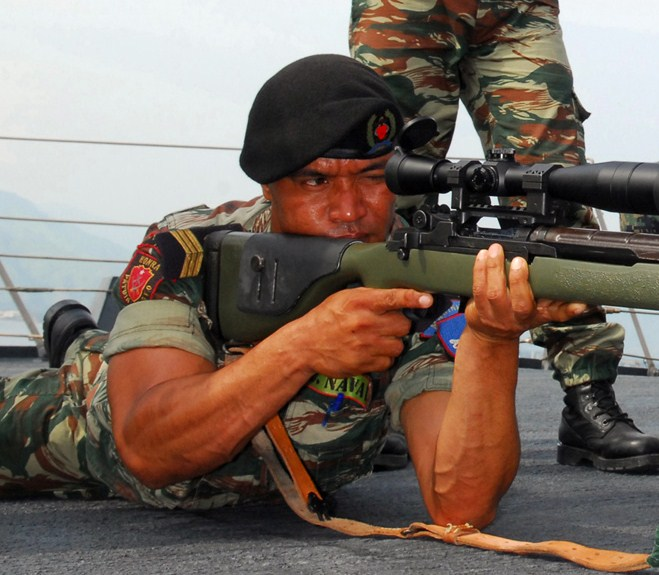
Segundo-sargento of the naval component (2009).

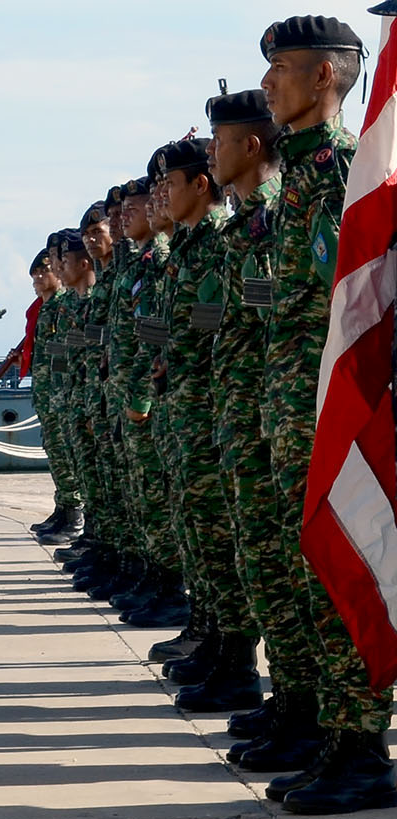
Personnel of the naval component (2014)

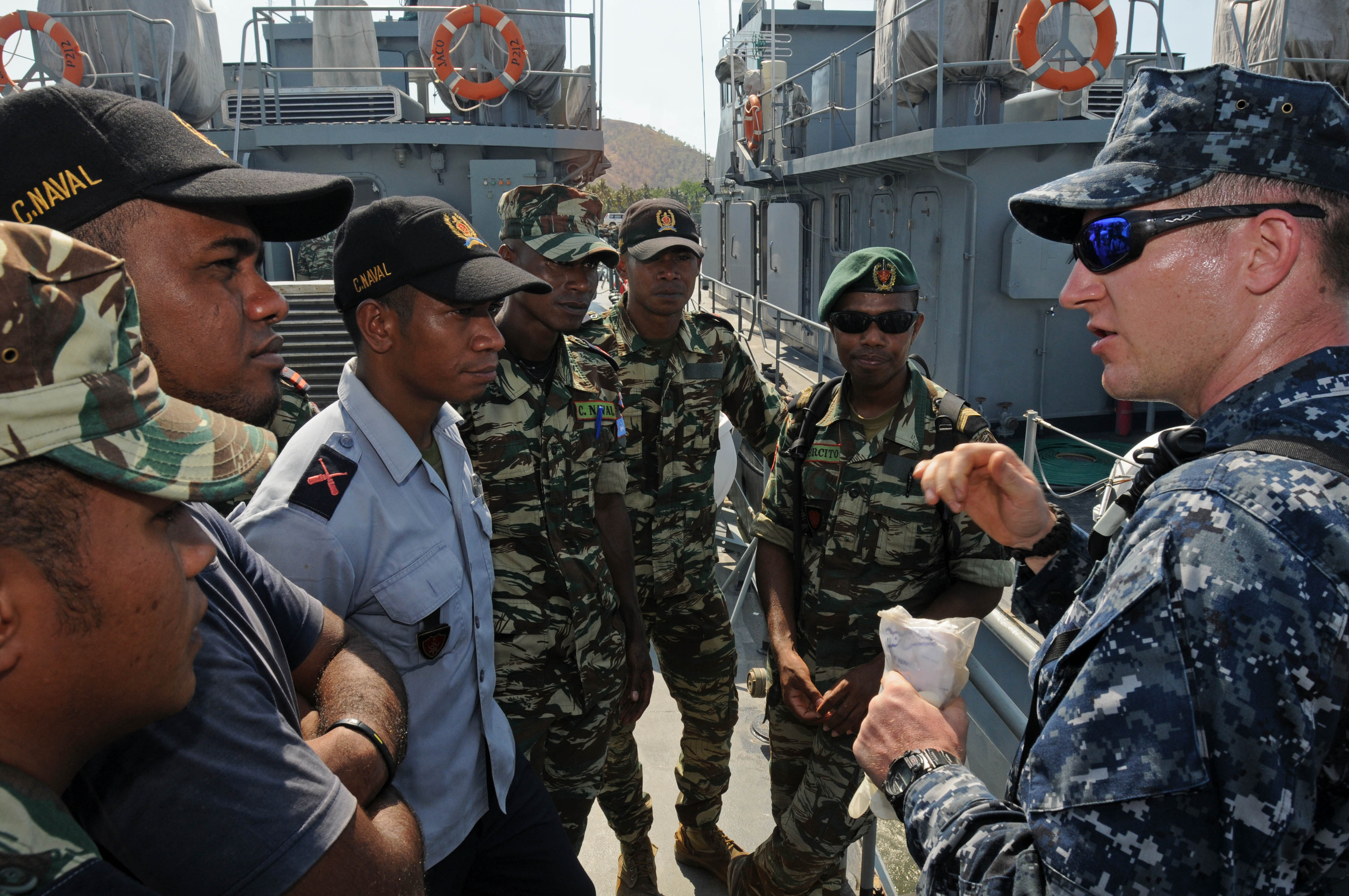
Personnel of the naval component (2012)

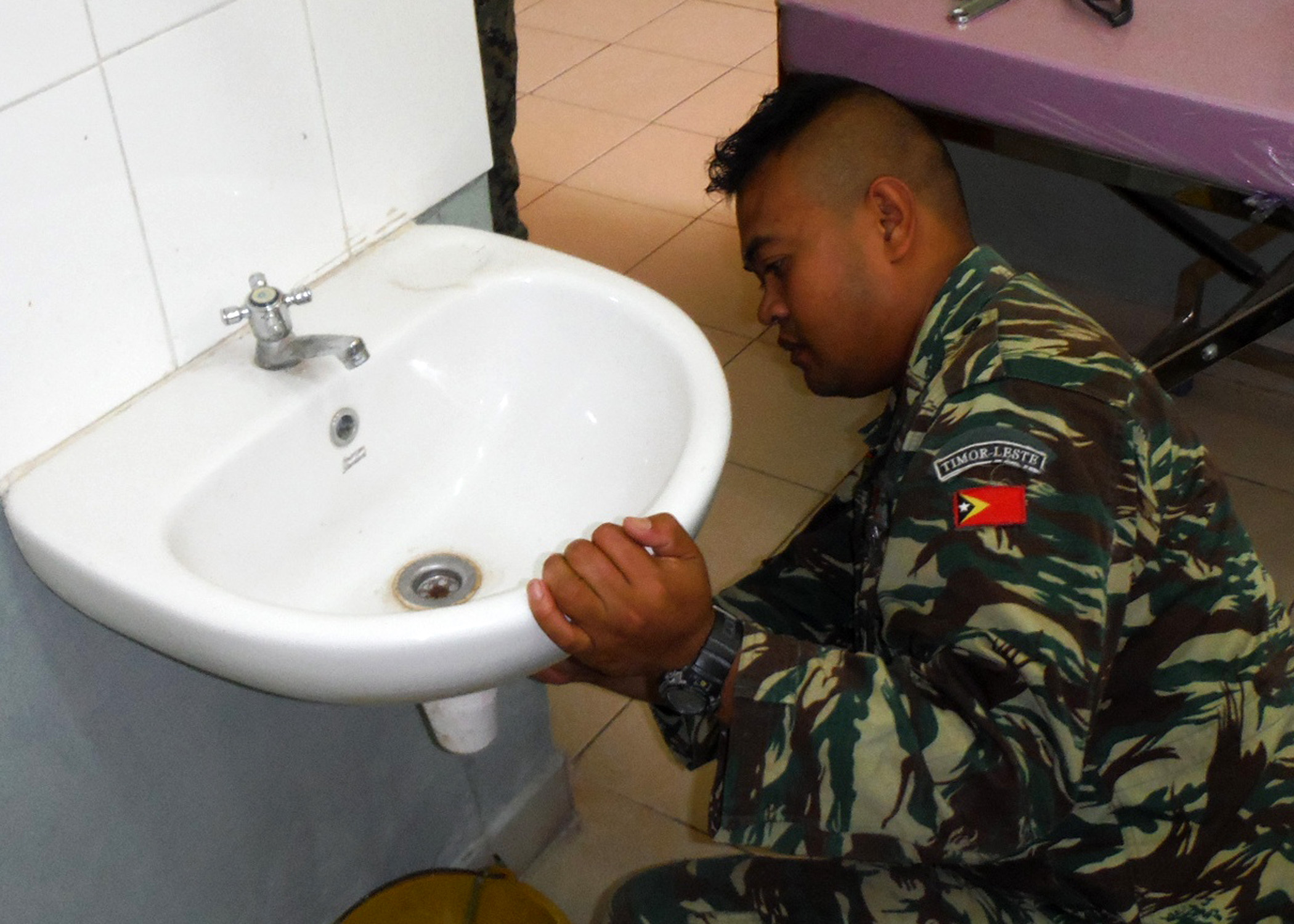
Soldier fixes a sink
