= Communist insurgency =

Communist insurgency is an umbrella term which may refer to one of several guerrilla conflicts involving communist parties, including:

- Communist insurgency in Bangladesh
  - 1972–1975 Bangladesh insurgency
  - Maoist insurgency in Bangladesh
- Communist insurgency in Bulgaria
- Communist insurgency in Chile
- Communism in Sumatra
- Communist insurgency in Malaysia (disambiguation)
  - Malayan Emergency
  - Communist insurgency in Sarawak
  - Communist insurgency in Malaysia (1968–1989)
- Communist insurgency in Myanmar
  - Myanmar civil war (2021–present)
- Insurgency in Paraguay
- Internal conflict in Peru
- Communist armed conflicts in the Philippines
  - Hukbalahap Rebellion (1942–1954)
  - New People's Army rebellion (1969–present)
- Communist insurgency in South Korea
- Communist insurgency in Thailand
- Colombian conflict (FARC, EPL and ELN insurgency)
- Maoist insurgency in Turkey
- Montoneros and People's Revolutionary Army insurgency in Argentina
- Naxalite–Maoist insurgency in India
- Nepalese Civil War
- JVP Insurrection (disambiguation) in Sri Lanka
  - 1971 JVP insurrection
  - 1987–1989 JVP insurrection
