= P102 =

P102 may refer to:

== Vessels ==
- ARM Juan de la Barrera (P102), a patrol boat of the Mexican Navy
- NNS Karaduwa (P102), a defense boat of the Nigerian Navy
- NRTL Atauro (P102), a patrol boat of the Timor Leste Defence Force

== Other uses ==
- Papyrus 102, a biblical manuscript
- P102, a a state regional road in Latvia
