= P101 =

P101 may refer to:

== Vessels ==
- ARM Leandro Valle (P101), a patrol boat of the Mexican Navy
- HMAS Bayonet (P 101), a patrol boat of the Royal Australian Navy
- NRTL Oecusse (P101), a patrol boat of the Timor Leste Defence Force
- VOEA Ngahau Koula (P101), a patrol boat of the Tongan Maritime Force

== Other uses ==
- Papyrus 101, a biblical manuscript
- PIK3R5, phosphoinositide 3-kinase regulatory subunit 5
- Programma 101, a desktop programmable calculator
- P101, a state regional road in Latvia
