= Chief of Defence Force (Timor-Leste) =

Head of the armed forces of Timor-Leste

Chief of the Defence Forces
- Chefe Estado Maior General Forças Armadas (Portuguese)
- Flag of the Timor-Leste Defence Force

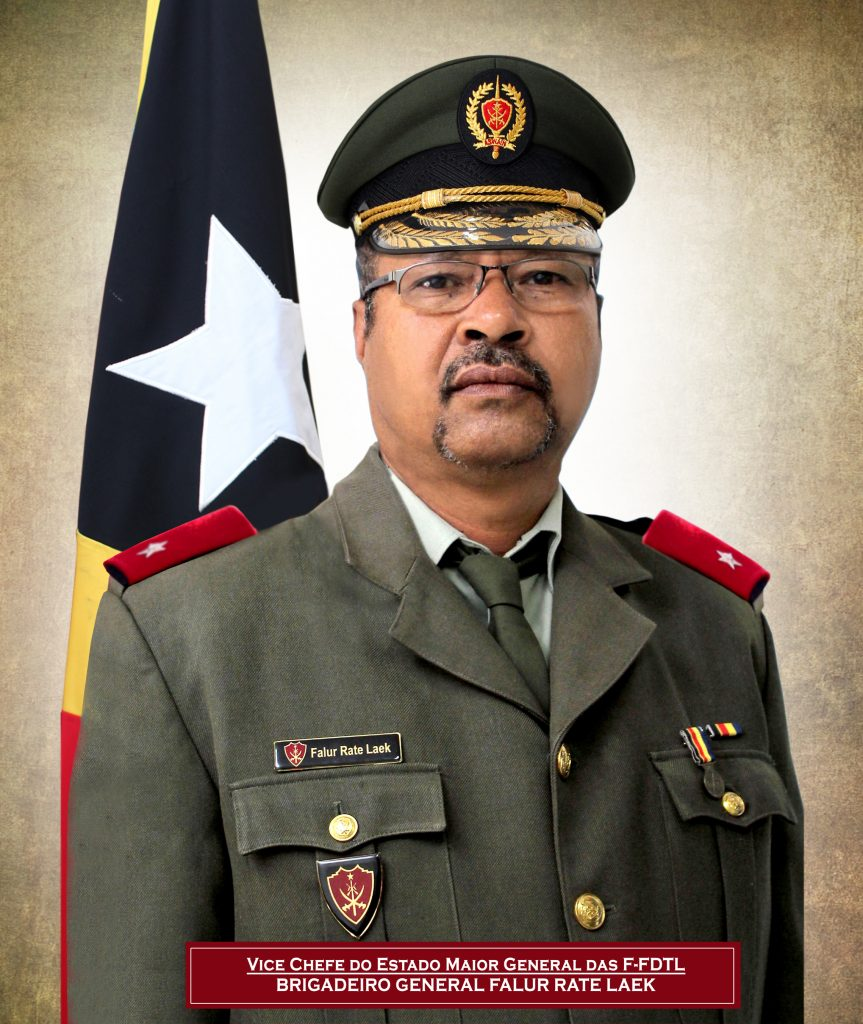
- Incumbent; Lieutenant General Falur Rate Laek since 28 January 2022
- Ministry for Defence
- Member of: Timor-Leste Defence Force
- Reports to: Minister for Defence
- Residence: Dili, Timor-Leste
- Formation: 20 May 2002
- First holder: Taur Matan Ruak
- Deputy: Deputy Chief of the Defence Force

The Chief of the Defence Forces (Portuguese: Chefe Estado Maior General Forças Armadas) is the head of the Timor-Leste Defence Force (F-FDTL). They are responsible for the administration and the operational control of the Timor-Leste military. The current chief is Falur Rate Laek, succeeding Lere Anan Timur.

== Commanders of the Falintil ==
No.	Portrait	Name (Birth–Death)	Term of office			Ref.
No.	Portrait	Name (Birth–Death)	Took office	Left office	Time in office	Ref.
1		Rogério Lobato (born 1949)	20 August 1975	1975	0 years	
2		Fernando do Carmo (?–1975)	1975	7 December 1975 †	0 years	
3		Nicolau dos Reis Lobato (1946–1978)	May 1976	31 December 1978	2 years, 7 months	
4		Xanana Gusmão (born 1946)	1981	20 November 1992	10–11 years	
5		Ma'huno Bulerek Karathayano (1949–2021)	1992	5 April 1993	0–1 years	
6		Nino Konis Santana (1957–1998)	April 1993	11 March 1998 #	4 years, 11 months	
7		Taur Matan Ruak (born 1956)	1998	1 February 2001	2–3 years	

== Chiefs of the Defence Forces ==
No.	Portrait	Name (Birth–Death)	Term of office			Ref.
No.	Portrait	Name (Birth–Death)	Took office	Left office	Time in office	Ref.
1		Major general Taur Matan Ruak (born 1956)	20 May 2002	1 September 2011	9 years, 104 days	
2		Lieutenant general Lere Anan Timur (born 1952)	6 October 2011	28 January 2022	10 years, 114 days	
3		Lieutenant general Falur Rate Laek (born 1955)	28 January 2022	Incumbent	4 years, 291 days	
