= Falur Rate Laek =

Timorese general (born 1955)

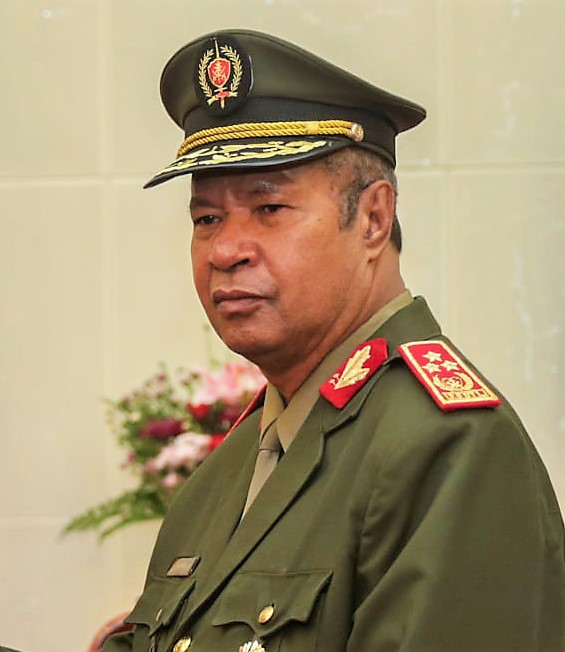
- Lieutenant General Falur Rate Laek

Personal details
- Born: Domingos Raúl; 9 July 1955 (age 71) Samaliu, Ossu Administrative Post, Viqueque Municipality, Portuguese Timor
- Party: Fretilin
- Awards: Grand Collar, Order of Timor-Leste; Medal of Merit; Halibur Medal

Military service
- Branch/service: Fretilin; Timor Leste Army
- Years of service: 1975 - Present
- Rank: Lieutenant General
- Unit: Chief of Defence Force; Deputy Commander of the Timor-Leste Defence Force; Chief of Staff, Timor Leste Defence Force; Nicolau Lobato Training Center; 1st Battalion, Timor Leste Army
- Battles/wars: Indonesian invasion of East Timor; Operation Halibur

Domingos Raúl, more commonly known as Falur Rate Laek, is an East Timorese general who serves as the incumbent Chief of Defence Force of the Timor-Leste Defence Force (F-FDTL). Before his assumption to the post, Falur Rate Laek formerly served as the Deputy Commander of the Timor-Leste Defence Force, Chief of Staff, Timor Leste Defence Force and as battalion commander of the 1st Battalion.

Born and raised from a family of farmers, Falur Rate Laek later became a member of the Fretilin during the Indonesian invasion of East Timor and later served under various positions within the Fretilin chain of command and was also involved during the 1999 East Timorese crisis, where the F-FDTL, backed by the International Force East Timor (INTERFRET) fought against Pro-Indonesia militias. Falur Rate Lek was later appointed by former President Francisco Guterres as the Chief of Defence Force on 28 January 2022 and was later promoted to the rank of lieutenant general.

== Early life and education ==
Falur Rate Laek was born on 9 July 1955 at Samaliu district, Ossu Administrative Post, which is located within the Viqueque Municipality and came from a simple family of farmers that owns a small farmland within the district. Falur Rate Laek is the fourth child among eleven siblings, and later entered the Loi-Huno Elementary School in 1964 and graduated in 1968. He later entered the intensive School Monitor course in 1973. Falur Rate Laek also completed various courses and programs such as the Operational Command and Forces Internship in Portugal, the Court Officer Course at the Nicolau Lobato Training Center (Centro de Instrução Comandante Nicolau Lobato), and the F-FDTL Officer and Sergeant Training Course in Aileu, Timor Leste.

== Military career ==
Falur Rate Laek entered the Falintil in 1975 and was later involved within the various operations within Timor Leste. During the Indonesian invasion of East Timor, Falur Rate Laek fought against Indonesian forces, and later became involved in logistics missions for the Falintil. Eventually, Falur Rate Laek later became a platoon commander and organized a localized resistance movement against the Indonesian Army in Ossu, which was under the Central-East sector of the Falintil. In January 1976 to September 1977, Falur Rate Laek served as a political assistant within the eastern coastal region, and was later transferred on the Central-Eastern Sector in September 1977 to 1978.

On 4 April 1979, due to the intensified operations launched by the Indonesian Armed Forces to counter resistance from the Falintil as part of their "encirclement and annihilation" campaign in 1977, Falur Rate Laek was captured and later surrendered to the Indonesian Armed Forces after the Indonesian Military launched attacks against the Falintil's support bases within the Central-Eastern Sector. Despite being under Indonesian captivity, Falur Rate Laek was later placed under the Lalu Rakyat Terlatih, an auxiliary unit of the Indonesian Armed Forces and still contributed to the resistance movement. He was also later named as the commander of the 2nd Company of the MIPLIN (People's Militia for National Liberation), and also conducted intelligence and logistical operations to the Falintil until he managed to escape in captivity in 1983 in the aftermath of the Kraras massacre. In 1984, he was later named as the 2nd Commander of the 3rd Company, and in 1985 he was later named as commander of the Company A Unit 4 of the Central-Eastern Sector. In 1985 to 1989, Falur Rate Laek later served as a political commissar of the Fretilin within the Viqueque Municipality and the Same Administrative Post. In 1997, Falur Rate Laek served as both commander and secretary of Region 3, covering the regions of Aileu Municipality, Manatuto Municipality, Viqueque Municipality and Same Administrative Post, and held this position until 1999.

Amidst the 1999 East Timorese crisis, which was followed by the 1999 East Timorese independence referendum and the deployment of the International Force East Timor (INTERFET) forces in Timor Leste, Falur Rate Laek served as a liaison officer under the Fretinil's Northern Region, and later led negotiations and reconciliation efforts against the Pro-Indonesia militias. On 1 February 2001, a year before Timor Leste's declaration of independence, Falur Rate Laek entered the F-FDTL Officer and Sergeant Training Course in Aileu, where he was promoted to the rank of lieutenant colonel and later took part of Operation Halibur during the 2006 Timor-Leste crisis, where he led joint offensive operations with the National Police of Timor-Leste against the rebel factions of the Timor-Leste Defence Force. Falur Rate Laek was later named as commander of the 1st Battalion from 2007 until 2008, and was later named as commander of the Nicolau Lobato Training Centre, and was later promoted to the rank of colonel on 14 January 2009.

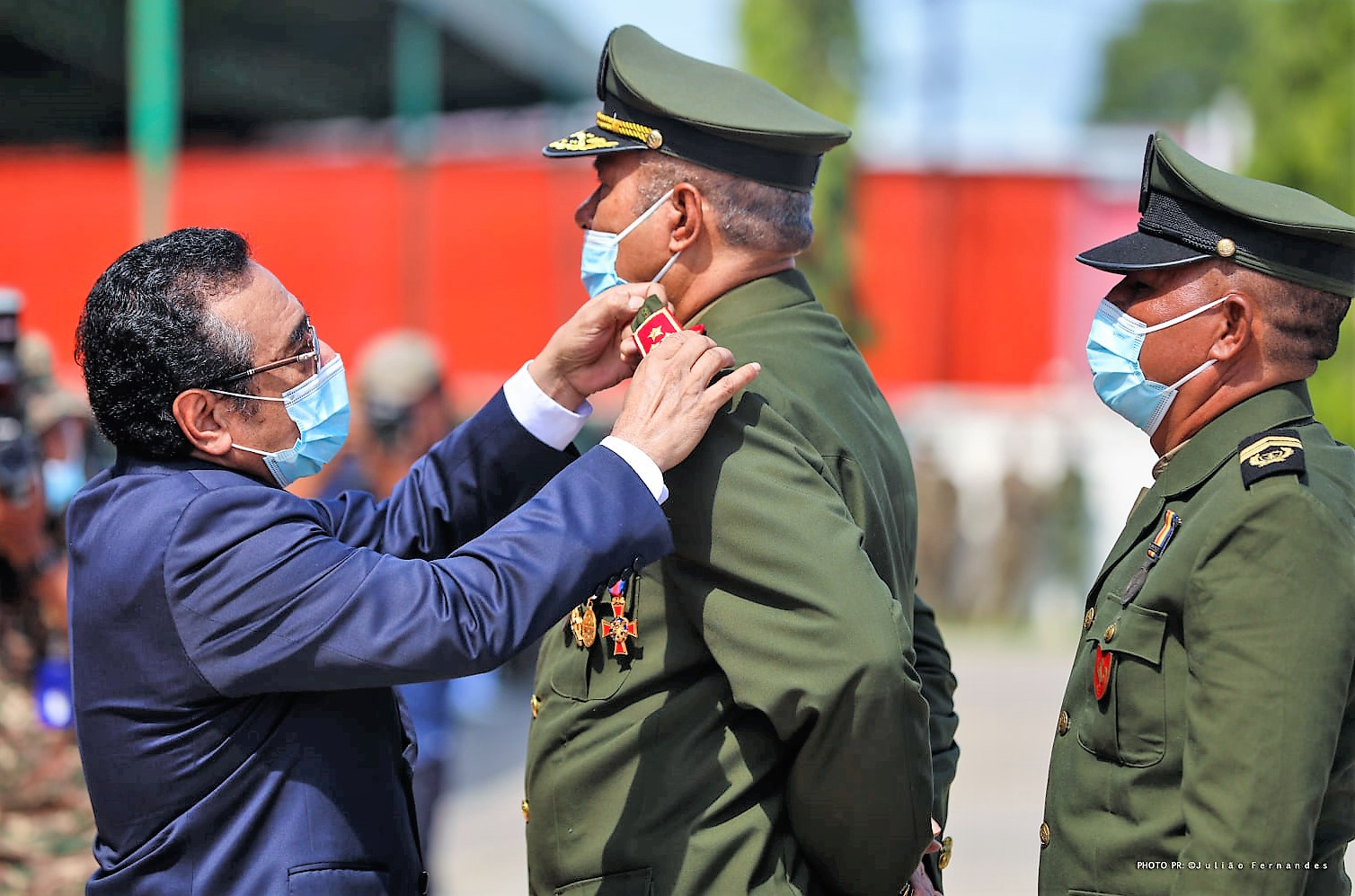
Then-Major General Falur Rate Laek being promoted to the rank of Lieutenant General during the change-of-command ceremony of the Chief of Defense Force (2022)

In August 2010, Falur Rate Laek was named as the Acting Chief of Staff of the Timor Leste Defence Force, and later assumed full command as Chief of Staff on 4 October 2011. In 2015, Falur also took part of joint military operations with the National Police Force against armed criminal groups. During his term as Chief of Staff, Falur's term was impacted due to the government's shuffling of ministers, which caused tensions between former President Taur Matan Ruak and the Defense Ministry, and led to the delay of his promotion to brigadier general, which is also a move that could temporarily place Falur in reserve. Despite the political uncertainty, Falur was later reelected as the Chief of Staff on 5 October 2017 and led to his renewed term which immediately began a day after his reappointment on 6 October 2015. His term also comes after his appointment by former President Francisco Guterres, and was later promoted to the rank of brigadier general on 7 June 2018. On 1 October 2018, Falur was named as the Deputy Commander of the Timor-Leste Defence Force. On 21 January 2022, Falur was later nominated by the Council of Ministers to become the Chief of Defence Force and later assumed his post on a week after on 28 January 2022, replacing Lieutenant General Lere Anan Timur.

== Dates of promotion ==
Lambang	Pangkat	Tanggal
	Lieutenant Colonel	1 February 2001
	Colonel	14 January 2010
	Brigadier General	7 June 2018
	Major General	26 February 2021
	Lieutenant General	28 January 2022

== Awards from military service ==
- Order of the Guerrilla (awarded on 7 December 2006)
- Halibur Medal (awarded in 2008)
- Medal of Merit
- Grand Collar, Order of Timor-Leste (awarded in May 2017)
- 1st Class, D. Afonso Henriques Medal (awarded by Portugal)

== Personal life ==
Falur Rate Laek is married to Rosa Maria Quintão and they have four children, consisting of three daughters and one son. His interests include defense, citizenship, and history, and is known to attend seminars related to these interests. Falur can speak four languages, namely Tetum, Makasae, Portuguese and Indonesian. Falur also wrote a personal memoir named O Vôo da Pomba and was published in 2018. He is also a known fan of football, and he is known as the football club president of the Clube Lica-Lica Lemorai and as the Vice President of the Football Federation of Timor-Leste.
