= NRTL Atauro =

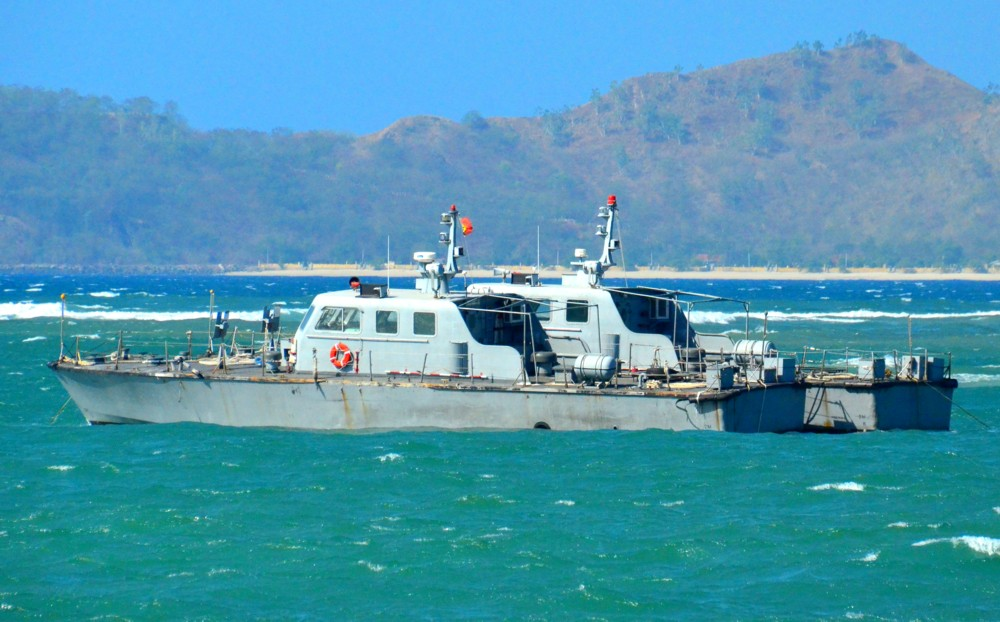
- East Timorese patrol boats P101 Oecusse & P102 Atauro on anchor in Port Hera off Dili

History

Portugal
- Name: Açor
- Namesake: Northern goshawk (açor in Portuguese)
- Owner: Portuguese State
- Operator: Portuguese Navy
- Builder: Arsenal do Alfeite
- Commissioned: 9 December 1974
- Home port: Lisbon Naval Base
- Fate: Transferred to East Timor

East Timor
- Name: Atauro
- Namesake: Atauro Island
- Operator: Timor Leste Defence Force
- Builder: Arsenal do Alfeite
- Commissioned: January 2002
- Renamed: January 2002 (from NRP Açor)
- Home port: Hera Naval Base
- Status: Active

General characteristics
- Class & type: Albatroz class patrol boat
- Displacement: 45 tons full load
- Length: 23.6 m (77 ft)
- Beam: 5.6 m (18 ft)
- Draught: 1.6 m (5 ft 3 in)
- Propulsion: 2 Cummins diesels, 1,100 hp, 2 shafts
- Speed: 20 knots (37 km/h; 23 mph)
- Range: 2,500 at 12 kts
- Complement: 1 officer, 7 enlisted
- Sensors & processing systems: Decca RM 316P radar
- Armament: 1 × Oerlikon 20 mm cannon, 2 × 12.7mm HMG

The East Timorese patrol boat Atauro (P 102) is one of the two Albatroz class patrol boats operated by the Timor Leste Defence Force. She was built in the mid-1970s for the Portuguese Navy and was commissioned on 9 December 1974 as NRP Açor (P 1163). She was donated to East Timor in January 2002 and was renamed. Atauro is based at Hera Naval Base.
