= Military build-up in Southeast Asia =

Military build-up in Southeast Asia has been a noticeable trend, as shown by force modernization, although there is not necessarily political will to improve military effectiveness. The phenomenon has been attributed to various factors, including protecting economic interest, self-reliance in the reduction of US commitment in the region, domestic and foreign tensions, and the need to replace colonial era material, but also some non-military related factors such as national prestige, political corruption, etc.

Almost all Southeast Asian nations modernized their militaries since 1975, the ending year of the Vietnam War, and continued since then, even though the process was slowed after the 1997 Asian financial crisis. During this period, military personnel, tanks, armored personnel carriers (APCs), medium-range howitzers, missile-armed naval vessels, combat helicopters and combat aircraft increased and modernized. However, experts pointed out that this still did not fit the definition of an arms race.

Southeast Asia had seen an increase in absolute defense spending, the biggest increase compared to other regions of the world, even though they are relatively unchanged in proportion to the country's GDP. The South China Sea dispute was cited by some analysts as the motive, but others pointed to steady military expenditure per capita and relatively small in change of military inventory compared to old equipment replaced.

== Statistics ==
Flag	Active military	Reserve military	Paramilitary	Total	Per 1,000 capita (total)	Per 1,000 capita (active)	
Brunei	7,200	700	500	8,400	18.6	16	
Cambodia	124,300	0	67,000	191,300	11.6	7.6	
Indonesia	405,000	400,000	280,000	1,085,000	3.8	1.4	
Laos	29,100	0	100,000	129,100	17.8	4	
Malaysia	113,000	51,600	267,200	431,800	13.6	3.6	(Note: The paramilitary forces of Malaysia includes 240,000 reservists from the People's Volunteer Corps.)
Myanmar	406,000	0	107,000	513,000	9.2	7.3	
Philippines	180,000	1,800,000	61,100	2,041,100	19.3	1.7	
Singapore	72,500	312,500	8,400	393,400	65.6	12.1	
Thailand	360,850	200,000	138,700	699,550	10.2	5.3	
Vietnam	600,000	5,000,000	250,000	5,850,000	60.3	6.2	

Countries (Note: All data apart from the number of nuclear weapons is taken from The Military Balance (2017 ).)	Military budget (US$ bn) (Note: Budget is annual)		Main battle tanks	Aircraft carriers	AWS	Cruisers	Destroyers	Frigates	Corvettes	Nuclear submarines	Non-nuclear Submarines	Military aircraft (Note: Fixed-wing aircraft with combat capability)	Attack helicopters (Note: Includes helicopters that have some attacking capabilities i.e. 'multi-role helicopters')	Nuclear weapons	Military satellites	Sources
Brunei	0	.573	0	0	0	0	0	0	4	0	0	0	0	0	0	
Cambodia	0	.446	200	0	0	0	0	0	0	0	0	5	14	0	0	
Indonesia	7	.09	378	0	5	0	0	11	18	0	5	97	45	0	0	
Laos	0	.024	25	0	0	0	0	0	0	0	0	0	12	0	0	
Malaysia	5	.03	48	0	0	0	0	2	4	0	2	67	32	0	0	
Myanmar	2	.43	185	0	0	0	0	4	2	0	2	155	27	TC	0	
Philippines	2	.09	0	0	2	0	0	4	1	0	0	22	27	0	0	
Singapore	10	.0	163	0	4	0	0	6	6	0	6	126	25	0	9	
Thailand	5	.69	288	1	5	0	0	10	7	0	0	143	47	0	0	
Timor-Leste	0	.072	0	0	0	0	0	0	0	0	0	0	0	0	0	
Vietnam	6	.2	1800	0	0	0	0	4	6	0	6	97	47	0	0	

== Regional overview ==
Noticeable modernization trends in Southeast Asia are acquiring of technological sophistication, such as guided munitions, and investment in command, control, communications and computer processing, as well as intelligence, surveillance, reconnaissance systems (C4ISR). Multi-role fighter aircraft, maritime reconnaissance aircraft, modern missiles (including anti-ship missiles, beyond visual range air-to-air missiles, air-to-ground missiles, tactical ground-to-ground missiles), modern artillery systems, submarines and warships equipped with the new electronics and anti-ship missiles, including Scud missiles, late-model MiG 29, F16, F18 and Su-27 jet fighters, MRLS systems, and modern frigates armed with Harpoon and Exocet missiles became more widespread. However, no regional nation seems able to adopt Revolution in military affairs (RMA) due to lack of military resource, technology and armed force specialists. Almost every military increased its conventional capabilities, while archipelago nations adopted rapid deployment. Navies tend to cover their lack of mine counter-measures, maritime surveillance, offshore patrol and anti-submarine capabilities. Another notable trend is the acquisition of advanced fighter aircraft, with Singapore being the first to introduce fourth-generation jet fighters.

Southeast Asia was the fastest-growing military spending region in the world between 2009 and 2018. Between 2009 and 2018, total regional spending was increased by 33 percent from $30.8 billion to $41.0 billion (constant 2017 US dollars). The region's share of global arms import increased from 5.8 percent in 1999–2007 to 8.1 percent in the period 1999–2018. China's rising to a regional military power and aggression in the South China Sea was cited as the motive for this period, and countries that are parties to the conflict saw the largest increase. Even though the proportion of military spending to each country's GDP remained constant and still did not fit the definition of arms race, the action-reaction pattern and low trust among the nations with lack of regional dispute resolution mechanisms meaning that there could be a risk of misunderstanding in the future.

In official defense policy documents often cited terrorist, armed rebels, pirates, smugglers and organized crime, including humanitarian assistance and disaster relief as the reasons of arms acquisition. However, the acquisition of tanker aircraft, combat aircraft, anti-submarine warfare aircraft, air-to-ground missiles, air defense systems, coastal defense systems, submarines, and surface combat ships, as well as amphibious assault landing ships, were the evidence that the nations perceived foreign threats. The equipment can engage with foreign threat far from home country, and could be seen by neighbors as "aggressive".

There is also a number of factors, even unreasonable, to arms acquisition, as in the countries with strong military influence in politics. Myanmar's military spending has been decreased after 2015 political reform, but the opposite is true for Thailand after the 2014 coup.

Military spending of Southeast Asian nations, 2009–18
Country	%Change	Numbers of years increased vs. decreased
SEA	33.1	▲7, ▼3
Brunei	-7.9	▲2, ▼8
Cambodia	190.6	▲10, ▼0
Indonesia	99.5	▲7, ▼3
Laos	N/A	▲4, ▼1 (incomplete data)
Malaysia	-18.5	▲4, ▼6
Myanmar	N/A	▲3, ▼3 (incomplete data)
Philippines	50.3	▲6, ▼4
Singapore	14.3	▲6, ▼4
Thailand	15.6	▲8, ▼2
Timor-Leste	-63.4	▲3, ▼7
Vietnam	75.5	▲8, ▼2

== By country ==
=== Brunei ===
The country has its share of military spending relative to its GDP higher than most SEA nations, but fluctuation of oil price means that it had to scale down its spending. Most of its imports were ships and naval weapons.

=== Cambodia ===
Between 2009 and 2018, Cambodia increased its military spending every year. Amount to $525.1 million in 2018, the spending accounted for an average of 2.1 percent in 2015–18. A border issue with Thailand in 2008 and 2011 is the motive. Moreover, increased political influence of the military since 2017 may likely also played a role. The country's military inventory did not change much during the period, only to replace decommissioned weapons. By 2018, the country had shifted more to land weapons, although it is subjected to change in the future.

=== Indonesia ===
Indonesia saw the necessity to modernize its armed forces from Communist takeover of Vietnam in 1975 and the poor performance in its invasion of East Timor in 1976. After the declaration of EEZ in the 1980s, the modernization process has concentrated on improving maritime security by developing its naval, air force, and rapid deployment capabilities, considering its geographical features as a large archipelago, sea lanes and waterways. Even though it would not to want to lag behind Singapore, but it appeared relaxed for its proportion of defense spending. The average annual spending in the 1990s was about 1.5% of its GDP, the lowest compared to its neighbors, showing its priority on economic development and declining status of the military in the post-Suharto era. The emphasis on modern modernization efforts was on its marine corps and navy, with construction of a major naval base in Teluk Rate.

The country increased its spending sharply in 2009–13, accounting to 109 percent increase. However, since then the share of military spending to the country's GDP was decreased in order to balance its budget. Its priority is to replace older systems, mostly acquiring new combat aircraft and warships, and one goal of its defense policy is to expand domestic arms production with deals include licensed production and some level of technological transfer. Its long-term plans include up to 230 new combat aircraft, several dozen frigates and up to 12 submarines by 2030, even though it seems not possible given the current spending rate.

In 2016, the country is the strongest military in SEA, its inventory include some of the most modern weapons from the West and Russia, including Russian Sukhoi-27/30 jets, American F-16s, German Type 209 submarines, Leopard II RI main battle tanks, and Ukrainian BTR-4M amphibious armored personnel carriers.

=== Laos ===
The military spending data of Laos was kept secret, but the amount is the second lowest in the region. The number is likely to increase when, threatened by Cambodia, it ordered new aircraft and tanks in 2017 and 2018.

=== Malaysia ===
The Malaysian Armed Force was experienced in counter-insurgency and jungle warfare from the multi-decade long communist insurgency. Recognizing its vulnerabilities from its long coastlines and offshore oil and gas fields as well as regional situations, the country began military build-up program PERISTA in 1979. Analysts commented on its will to catch up with its neighbor on conventional capabilities. Apart from being halted in 1997 economic crisis and its aftermath, the modernization was continuous and show determination of develop all-round capabilities and counter Singaporean build-up. The result would be an armed force with enhanced maritime security and power projection capabilities.

Malaysia allocated military budget according to its economy which fluctuated in the recent years. It remained focus on naval buildups, and it published a long-term plan for improving air force capabilities.

=== Myanmar ===
The military of Myanmar was neglected until 1988 coup. The military junta then underwent a modernization program aimed at covering its obsolete weapons and increase the manpower. However, the program had been a quantitative expansion. Even though it managed to subdue various ethnic insurgencies, its military is still considered weak compared to its neighbors. Its priority was given to buying of cheap weapon systems. But its investment on local arms industry resulted in ability to produce light weapons, light armored vehicles, land mines, mortars and ammunition. It increasingly focused outwardly to Thailand's growing military capabilities and China's influence over the country.

Myanmar's spending data was incomplete as the case of Laos'. Its spending is likely to have decreased after civilian government since 2015, and Western countries enforced arms embargo is gradually lifted in practice. Its main security problems are still ongoing internal conflict, but recent maritime conflict with Bangladesh drive naval spending. It also expressed interest in developing its own arms industry and technological transfer.

=== Philippines ===
The Philippines was preoccupied with internal insurgencies and factionalism, coupled with a military alliance with the US and continued presence of naval and air bases meant that there was no pressure of military modernization. After the decreased US aid and conflict in the Spratly Islands, Military Modernization Bill was signed into law in 1995, but the actual program was launched in 1999, partly due to the economic crisis.

Its military spending increased by 50.3 percent between 2009 and 2018 in real terms, however, its economic burden remained stable. The increase was in part due to higher salary of servicemen. The Armed Forces of the Philippines priority shifted to territorial defense. However, due to criticism of Duterte's policies, some Western countries refused to export weapons to the country. It then shifted attention to make deals with Russia, China and Israel. Its inventory is one of the most outdated in the region, and the Revised AFP Modernization Act of 2013 outlined its effort to modernize its armed force by 2027. Eighty-seven percent of arms imports were aircraft or ships.

=== Singapore ===
Singapore has developed its military continuously, not being halted by 1997 crisis. Its leadership considered the armed forces necessary to act as a deterrent, given the country's status as a city-state in a volatile region. It embraced the idea of RMA and enhanced its military technologies. Singapore was the most powerful military in Southeast Asia as of 2004, and there is a continuous political will and funds to do modernize its military. Apart from importing new vehicles into its army, navy and air force, its army also introduced locally built infantry fighting vehicles.

During the period of 2009 to 2018, the country allocated a percentage of its GDP to military spending unchanged. It had been the region's largest arms importer, and was ranked top four in Global Militarization Index by Bonn International Center for Conversion since 2007. The country has a well-developed arms industry with the ability to produce locally made armoured vehicles, artillery and ships, some of which also exported. Singaporean air force is the most capable of long distance action. Singapore has been a participant in the US F-35 programme since 2003.

=== Thailand ===
Thailand had received much military aid from the US in the Vietnam War era. The Communist victory in 1975 and subsequent US withdrawal from the country boosted its military modernization efforts. Domestic factors also played a role: it faced multi-decade long Communist insurgency and infighting in and among its uniformed units vying for more resources. Since the 1990s, the country focused on improving the navy to protect the interest in its Exclusive Economic Zone (EEZ). The purchase of an aircraft carrier Chakri Naruebet indicated its ambition of developing a blue-water capabilities, even though prestige was also a contributing factor. Reform efforts were underway, where all the services were downsized and better-trained. Purchase of artillery, IFVs, tanks, submarines, fighter aircraft and frigates seemed to be its priority. The country often opted for buying second-hand weapon systems or upgrading its existing equipment. The effort was in part due to its worry of losing pace to Malaysia.

Military corruption is well documented in Thailand. An average of 15–20% of commissions on arms sales was reported. Domestic political factors also played a role in the allocation of budget when the civilian government repay the navy who did not join the military junta of 1991. Defense ministers often cited lagging behind in number of submarines as the reason for it to have ones of its own.

Between 2009 and 2018, Thailand's military spending increased by 16 percent in real terms, but the share to its GDP was decreased. However, after the 2014 coup, military spending was increased at a greater pace, and is likely to continue by its 20-year national strategy roadmap. Western reluctance to export its arms to Thailand brought the country to accept deals from China, though there was no formal arms embargo. Its largest investment of major weapons since 2010 was the three planned S-26T submarines from China. The volume of its military inventory only marginally increase, as older weapons were decommissioned. Its modern equipment include F-16s and Saab JAS 39 Gripen multi-role aircraft, T-84 Oplot-M main battle tank, Knox-class and Type 025T and Type 053HT missile frigates.

=== Timor-Leste ===
Timor-Leste set its military budget to below 1 percent of GDP, and sharply fall in 2018. The only known major arms deliveries to the countries was patrol craft from China and South Korea in 2010–11.

=== Vietnam ===
In the aftermath of Vietnam War, Vietnam has increased military capabilities following of captured US materiel. However, when the Soviet Union who long supplied it with ammunition and equipment cut off its support, and the stalemate of Cambodian Civil War prompted its leadership to demobilize and shift away from forward deployment. In the 1990s, the country did not undergo same scale of modernization as Singapore, Malaysia, Thailand and Myanmar.

The figure of military spending was a state secret, but estimated to be increased steadily, amounting to 75 percent increase in real terms during 2009 and 2018. However, there were also reports of off-budget spending. Vietnam has military cooperation with India and bought many of its new weapons. Its personnel are being trained by Australia and Japan. The local arms industry received foreign support and currently is available to produce foreign design warships. The China threat remains the focus of the country's effort. It has modernized and expanded its navy, which effectively acquire a whole new navy. The new submarines and modern frigates gave the navy with blue-water capabilities.
