= Albatroz-class patrol boat =

Ship class of the Portuguese Navy

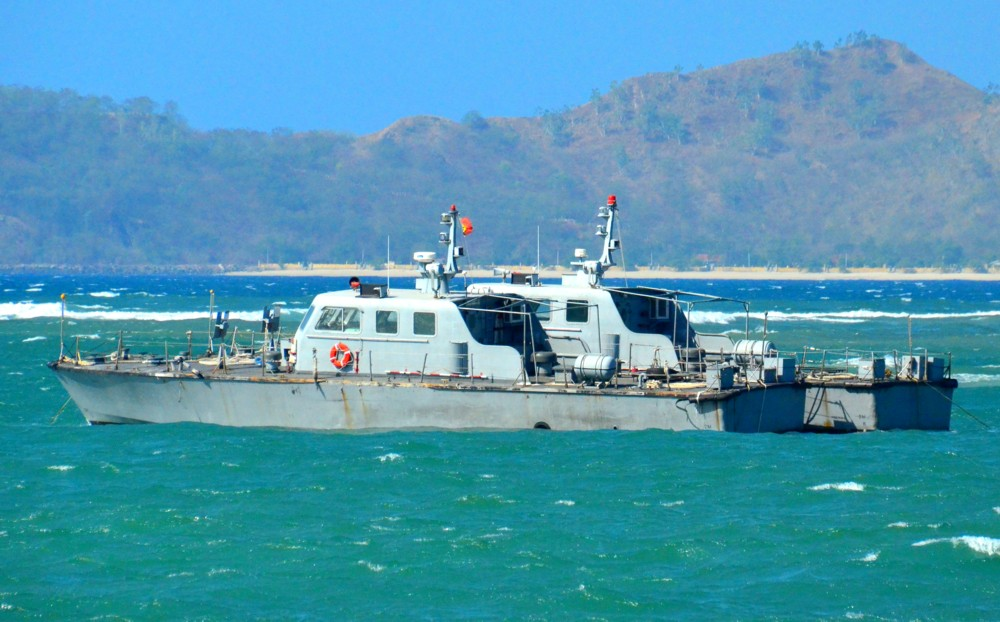
- East Timorese patrol boats Oecusse (P101) and Atauro (P102) on anchor in Port Hera off Dili

Class overview
- Name: Albatroz class patrol boat
- Builders: Arsenal do Alfeite
- Operators: Portuguese Navy; Timor-Leste Navy; Public Security Police Force
- Succeeded by: Argos and Centauro; *Jaco class patrol boat (East Timor service)
- Built: 1974-1975
- In commission: 1974–present
- Completed: 6
- Active: 4

General characteristics
- Displacement: 45 tons full load
- Length: 23.6m
- Beam: 5.6m
- Draft: 1.6m
- Propulsion: 2 Cummins diesels, 1,100 hp, 2 shafts
- Speed: 20kts
- Range: 2,500 at 12 kts
- Complement: 1 officer; 7 enlisted
- Sensors & processing systems: Decca RM 316P radar
- Armament: 1 × Oerlikon 20 mm cannon; 2 × 12.7mm HMG

The Albatross class is a class of patrol boats in the Portuguese Navy and in the Naval Component of the Timor Leste Defence Force (FDTL). These vessels were built in 1974 and 1975 at the Alfeite Arsenal, Lisbon.

In the Portuguese Navy, the Albatross-class boats are being replaced by Argos and Centauro classes. In 2002, the NRP Albatroz and NRP Açor were transferred to the FDTL, becoming the first craft in its Naval Component. In Timor Leste, they are referred as Oecusse class.

== Units ==
=== Portuguese Navy ===
Name & number	Commission	State
NRP Albatroz (P 1012)	1974 - 2002	Transferred to Timor Leste as the Oecusse in 2002.
NRP Açor (P 1163)	1974 - 2002	Transferred to Timor Leste as the Atauro in 2002.
NRP Andorinha (P 1164)	1975 - 1999	Decommissioned
NRP Águia (P 1165)	1975 - 2016	Decommissioned
NRP Condor (P 1166); UAM Condor (UAM 630) - since 1999	1974 - 2018	Decommissioned
NRP Cisne (P 1167)	1974 - 2018	Decommissioned

=== Macau Maritime and Fiscal Police ===
Name & number	Commission	State
Mondego (B-1)		Fate unknown.
Tejo (B-3)		Fate unknown.
Douro (B-4)		Fate unknown.

=== Naval Component of Timor Leste ===
Name & number	Commission	State
NRTL Oecusse (P 101)	1974 - 2002	In service. Former NRP Albatroz.
NRTL Atauro (P 102)	1974 - 2002	In service. Former NRP Açor.
