= JVP Insurrection =

- 1971 JVP insurrection, the first attempt by the Janatha Vimukthi Peramuna to overthrow the Sri Lankan government.
- 1987–1989 JVP insurrection, the second attempt, the insurgency lasted 3 years.
