= NRTL Oecusse =

Former East Timor ship

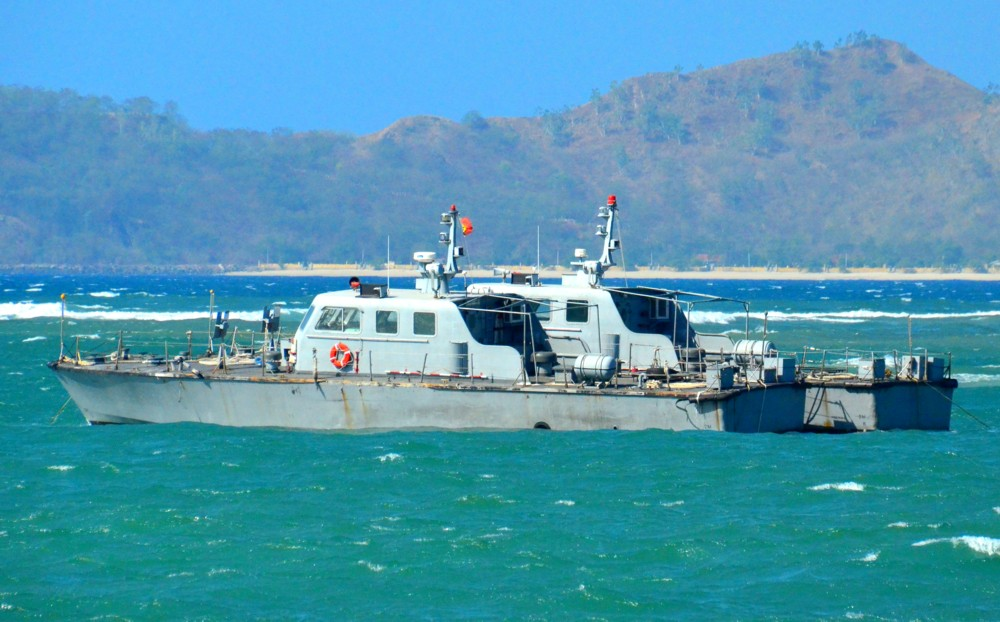
- East Timorese patrol boats P101 Oecusse & P102 Atauro on anchor in Port Hera off Dili

History

East TimorPortugal, East Timor
- Namesake: Oecusse District
- Builder: Arsenal do Alfeite
- Commissioned: 9 December 1974 (Portugal) January 2002 (East Timor)
- Renamed: January 2002 (from Albatroz)
- Home port: Hera Naval Base
- Status: Active

General characteristics
- Class & type: Albatroz class patrol boat
- Displacement: 45 tons full load
- Length: 23.6 m (77 ft)
- Beam: 5.6 m (18 ft)
- Draught: 1.6 m (5 ft 3 in)
- Propulsion: 2 Cummins diesels, 1,100 hp, 2 shafts
- Speed: 20 knots (37 km/h; 23 mph)
- Range: 2,500 at 12 kts
- Complement: 1 officer, 7 enlisted
- Sensors & processing systems: Decca RM 316P radar
- Armament: 1 × Oerlikon 20 mm cannon, 2 × 12.7mm HMG

The East Timorese patrol boat Oecusse (P 101) is one of the two Albatroz class patrol boats operated by the Timor Leste Defence Force. She was built in the mid-1970s for the Portuguese Navy and was commissioned on 9 December 1974 as NRP Albatroz (P 1162). She was donated to East Timor in January 2002 and was renamed. Oecusse is based at Hera Naval Base.
