= Timor-Leste Defence Force =

Combined military forces of Timor-Leste

- Falintil-Forças de Defesa de Timor Leste
- F-FDTL flag

- F-FDTL emblem
- Motto: Pátria povo (Fatherland and people)
- Founded: 20 August 1975; 51 years ago
- Current form: 1 February 2001; 25 years ago
- Service branches: Land Component; Naval Component; Light Air Component
- Headquarters: Dili
- Website: f-fdtl.mil.tl

Leadership
- President: Jose Ramos-Horta
- Minister for Defence: Filomeno da Paixão de Jesus
- Chief of Defence Force: Lieutenant general Falur Rate Laek

Personnel
- Military age: 18
- Conscription: Yes
- Active personnel: 2,300 (IISS, 2020)
- Reserve personnel: None

Expenditure
- Budget: $47.8 million USD (2025)
- Percent of GDP: 2.25%

Related articles
- Ranks: Military ranks of Timor-Leste

The Timor-Leste Defence Force (Tetum: Forcas Defesa Timor Lorosae, Portuguese: Forças de Defesa de Timor Leste or Falintil-FDTL, often F-FDTL) is the military of Timor-Leste. The F-FDTL was established in February 2001 and comprises two infantry battalions, small naval and air components and several supporting units.

The F-FDTL's primary role is to protect Timor-Leste from external threats. It also has an internal security role, which overlaps with that of the National Police of Timor-Leste (PNTL). This overlap has led to tensions between the services, which have been exacerbated by poor morale and lack of discipline within the F-FDTL.

The F-FDTL's problems came to a head in 2006 when almost half the force was dismissed following protests over discrimination and poor conditions. The dismissal contributed to a general collapse of both the F-FDTL and PNTL in May and forced the government to request foreign peacekeepers to restore security. The F-FDTL is currently being rebuilt with foreign assistance and has drawn up a long-term force development plan.

== Role ==
The constitution of Timor-Leste assigns the F-FDTL responsibility for protecting Timor-Leste against external attack. The constitution states that the F-FDTL "shall guarantee national independence, territorial integrity and the freedom and security of the populations against any aggression or external threat, in respect for the constitutional order." The constitution also states that the F-FDTL "shall be non-partisan and shall owe obedience to the competent organs of sovereignty in accordance with the Constitution and the laws, and shall not intervene in political matters." The National Police of Timor-Leste (or PNTL) and other civilian security forces are assigned responsibility for internal security. In practice, the responsibilities of the F-FDTL and the PNTL were not clearly defined, leading to conflict between the two organizations.

The East Timorese Government has broadened the F-FDTL's role over time. As what have been designated "new missions", the F-FDTL has been given responsibility for crisis management, supporting the suppression of civil disorder, responding to humanitarian crises and facilitating co-operation between different parts of the government.

== History ==
=== Pre-independence ===
The F-FDTL was formed from the national liberation movement guerrilla army known as FALINTIL (Portuguese acronym for Forças Armadas de Libertação de Timor-Leste or Armed Forces for the Liberation of Timor-Leste). During the period before 1999 some East Timorese leaders, including the current President José Ramos-Horta, proposed that a future East Timorese state would not have a military. The widespread violence and destruction that followed the independence referendum in 1999 and the need to provide employment to FALINTIL veterans led to a change in policy. The inadequate number of police officers who were deployed to East Timor as part of the United Nations-led peacekeeping force contributed to high rates of crime. The presence of 1,300 armed and increasingly dissatisfied FALINTIL personnel in cantonments during late 1999 and most of 2000 also posed a threat to security. Following the end of Indonesian rule, FALINTIL proposed the establishment of a large military of about 5,000 personnel.

In mid-2000 the United Nations Transitional Administration in East Timor (UNTAET) contracted a team from King's College London to conduct a study of East Timor's security force options and options to demobilise the former guerrilla forces. The team's report identified three options for an East Timorese military. Option 1 was based on FALINTIL's preference for a relatively large and heavily armed military of 3,000–5,000 personnel, option 2 was a force of 1,500 regulars and 1,500 conscripts and option 3 was for a force of 1,500 regulars and 1,500 volunteer reservists. The study team recommended option 3 as being best suited to East Timor's security needs and economic situation. This recommendation was accepted by UNTAET in September 2000 and formed the basis of East Timor's defence planning. (Note: The King's College report estimated that a military of 1,500 regulars and 1,500 reservists would cost approximately one per cent of East Timor's GDP and that this was the highest level of military expenditure the country could sustain.) The plan was also accepted by all the countries that had contributed peacekeeping forces to East Timor. The King's College report was criticised by Greg Sheridan, foreign editor of The Australian, on the grounds that it led East Timor to establish a large police force and a large Army when its security needs might have been better met by a single smaller paramilitary force.

While East Timor's decision to form a military has been criticised by some commentators, the East Timorese government has consistently believed that the force is necessary for political and security reasons. Critics of the F-FDTL's establishment argue that as East Timor does not face any external threats the government's limited resources would be better spent on strengthening the PNTL. While East Timor's political leadership recognised that the country does not currently face an external threat, they believed that it is necessary to maintain a military capacity to deter future aggression. The establishment of the F-FDTL was also seen as an effective means of integrating FALINTIL into an independent East Timor.

=== Formation of the F-FDTL ===
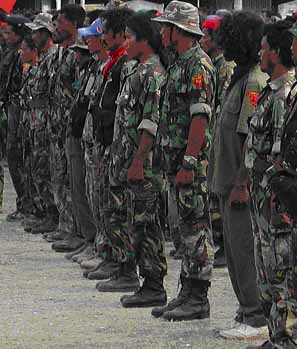
FALINTIL veterans

An Office for Defence Force Development staffed mainly by foreign military officers was established to oversee the process of forming Timor-Leste's armed forces and demobilising the former guerrillas. The Office delegated responsibility for recruiting personnel to FALINTIL's leaders.

FALINTIL officially became F-FDTL on 1 February 2001. The first 650 members of the F-FDTL were selected from 1,736 former FALINTIL applicants and began training on 29 March. The FDTL's 1st Battalion was established on 29 June 2001 and reached full strength on 1 December. Most members of the battalion were from Timor-Leste's eastern provinces. The 2nd Battalion was established in 2002 from a cadre of the 1st Battalion and was composed mainly of new personnel under the age of 21 who had not participated in the independence struggle. Due to the force's prestige and relatively high pay, there were 7,000 applications for the first 267 positions in the battalion. The F-FDTL's small naval component was established in December 2001. The Australian UNTAET contingent provided most of the F-FDTL's training, and the United States equipped the force.

Some of the problems that have affected the F-FDTL throughout its existence were caused by the process used to establish the force. A key flaw in this process was that FALINTIL's high command was allowed to select candidates for the military from members of FALINTIL without external oversight. As a result, the selection was conducted, to a large degree, on the basis of applicants' political allegiance. This led to many FALINTIL veterans feeling that they had been unfairly excluded from the military and reduced the force's public standing. The decision to recruit young people who had not served in FALINTIL in the subsequent rounds of recruitment led to further tensions within the F-FDTL due to the often large age gap between the veterans and the new recruits and the fact that while the senior officers tended to be from the east of the country most of the junior officers and infantry were from the west. Furthermore, UNTAET failed to establish adequate foundations for the East Timorese security sector by developing legislative and planning documents, administrative support arrangements and mechanisms for the democratic control of the military. These omissions remained uncorrected after Timor-Leste achieved independence on 20 May 2002.

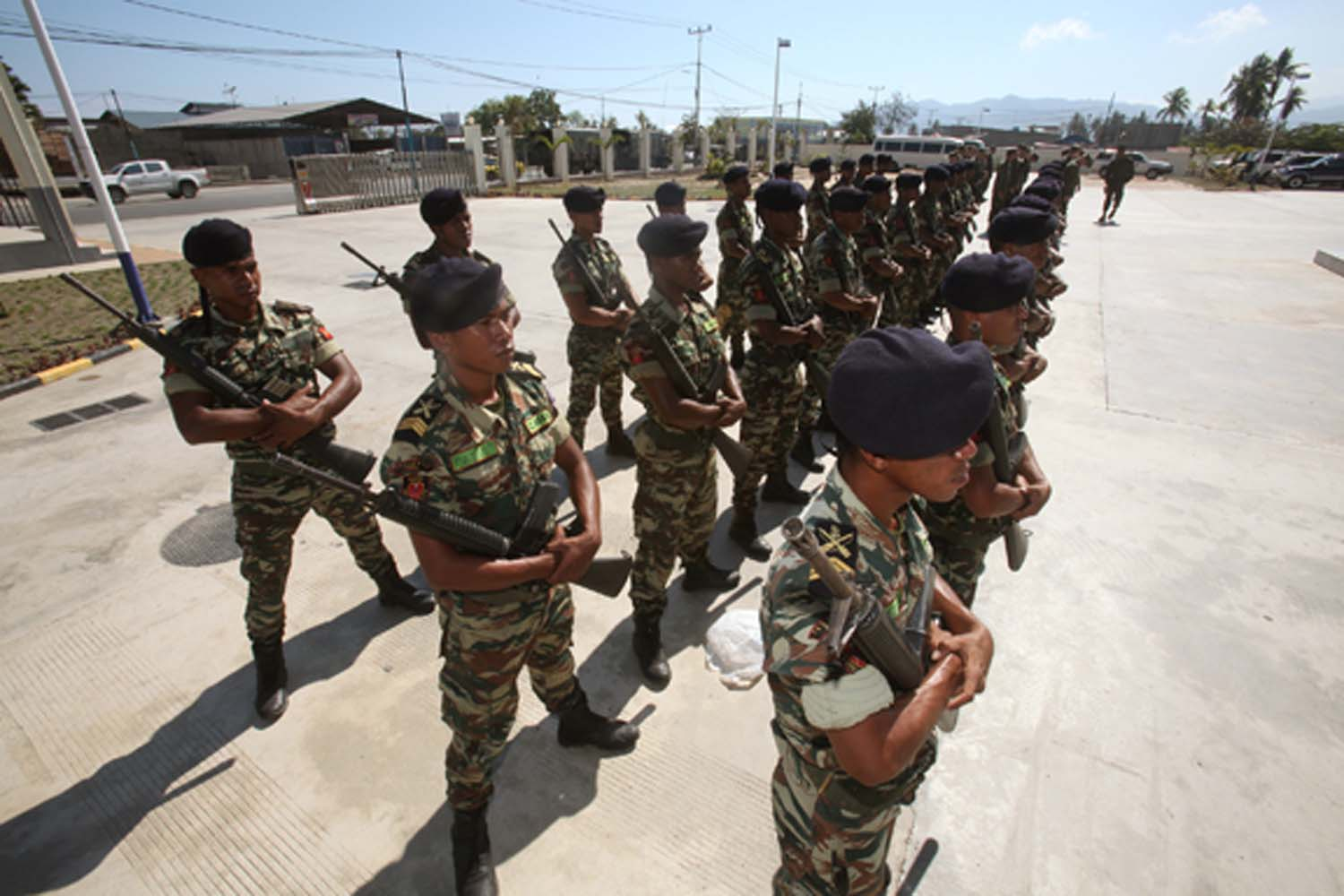
F-FDTL soldiers standing in formation

The F-FDTL gradually assumed responsibility for Timor-Leste's security from the UN peacekeeping force. The Lautém District was the first area to pass to the F-FDTL in July 2002. After further training the F-FDTL took over responsibility for the entire country's external security on 20 May 2004, although some foreign peacekeepers remained in Timor-Leste until mid-2005. The F-FDTL conducted its first operation in January 2003 when an army unit was called in to quell criminal activity caused by west Timorese militia gangs in the Ermera district. While the F-FDTL operated in a "relatively disciplined and orderly fashion" during this operation, it illegally arrested nearly 100 people who were released 10 days later without being charged.

The F-FDTL has suffered from serious morale and disciplinary problems since its establishment. These problems have been driven by uncertainty over the F-FDTL's role, poor conditions of service due to limited resources, tensions arising from FALINTIL's transition from a guerrilla organisation to a regular military and political and regional rivalries. The F-FDTL's morale and disciplinary problems have resulted in large numbers of soldiers being disciplined or dismissed. The East Timorese Government was aware of these problems before the 2006 crisis but did not rectify the factors that were contributing to low morale.

Tensions between the F-FDTL and PNTL have also reduced the effectiveness of Timor-Leste's security services. In 2003, the East Timorese Government established three new paramilitary police forces equipped with modern military-grade weapons. The formation of these units led to dissatisfaction with the Government among some members of the F-FDTL. During 2003 and 2004, members of the police and F-FDTL clashed on a number of occasions, and groups of soldiers attacked police stations in September 2003 and December 2004. These tensions were caused by the overlapping roles of the two security services, differences of opinion between members of Timor-Leste's leadership and the fact that many members of the PNTL had served with the Indonesian National Police prior to Timor-Leste's independence while the F-FDTL was based around FALINTIL.

=== 2006 crisis ===
External image
- An East Timorese soldier during fighting in May 2006

The tensions within the F-FDTL came to a head in 2006. In January, 159 soldiers from most units in the F-FDTL complained in a petition to then President Xanana Gusmão that soldiers from the east of the country received better treatment than westerners. The 'petitioners' received only a minimal response and left their barracks three weeks later, leaving their weapons behind. They were joined by hundreds of other soldiers and on 16 March the F-FDTL's commander, Brigadier General Taur Matan Ruak, dismissed 594 soldiers, which was nearly half of the force. The soldiers dismissed were not limited to the petitioners, and included about 200 officers and other ranks who had been chronically absent without leave in the months and years before March 2006.

The crisis escalated into violence in late April. On 24 April, the petitioners and some of their supporters held a four-day demonstration outside the Government Palace in Dili calling for the establishment of an independent commission to address their grievances. Violence broke out on 28 April when some of the petitioners and gangs of youths who had joined the protest attacked the Government Palace. The PNTL failed to contain the protest and the Palace was badly damaged. After violence spread to other areas of Dili, Prime Minister Mari Alkatiri requested that the F-FDTL help restore order. Troops with no experience in crowd control were deployed to Dili on 29 April and three deaths resulted. On 3 May Major Alfredo Reinado, the commander of the F-FDTL's military police unit, and most of his soldiers including Lt Gastão Salsinha abandoned their posts in protest at what they saw as the army's deliberate shooting of civilians.

Fighting broke out between the remnants of the East Timorese security forces and the rebels and gangs in late May. On 23 May Reinado's rebel group opened fire on F-FDTL and PNTL personnel in the Fatu Ahi area. On 24 May F-FDTL personnel near the Force's headquarters were attacked by a group of rebel police officers, petitioners and armed civilians. The attack was defeated when one of the F-FDTL naval component's patrol boats fired on the attackers. During the crisis the relationship between the F-FDTL and PNTL had deteriorated further, and on 25 May members of the F-FDTL attacked the PNTL's headquarters, killing nine unarmed police officers.

As a result of the escalating violence the government was forced to appeal for international peacekeepers on 25 May. Peacekeepers began to arrive in Dili the next day and eventually restored order. A total of 37 people were killed in the fighting in April and May and 155,000 fled their homes. A United Nations inquiry found that the interior and defence ministers and the commander of the F-FDTL had illegally transferred weapons to civilians during the crisis and recommended that they be prosecuted.

By September the F-FDTL had been much reduced, and comprised Headquarters (95 personnel), Force Communications Unit (21), Military Police Unit (18), First Battalion (317), Naval Component (83), Force Logistics Unit (63) and Nicolau Lobato Training Centre, Metinaro (118). In addition, 43 former Second Battalion members were on courses.

=== Force development plans ===
The 2006 crisis left the F-FDTL "in ruins". The F-FDTL's strength fell from 1,435 in January 2006 to 715 in September and the proportion of westerners in the military fell from 65 per cent to 28 per cent. The F-FDTL started a rebuilding process with support from several nations and the United Nations, but was still not ready to resume responsibility for Timor-Leste's external security two years after the crisis.

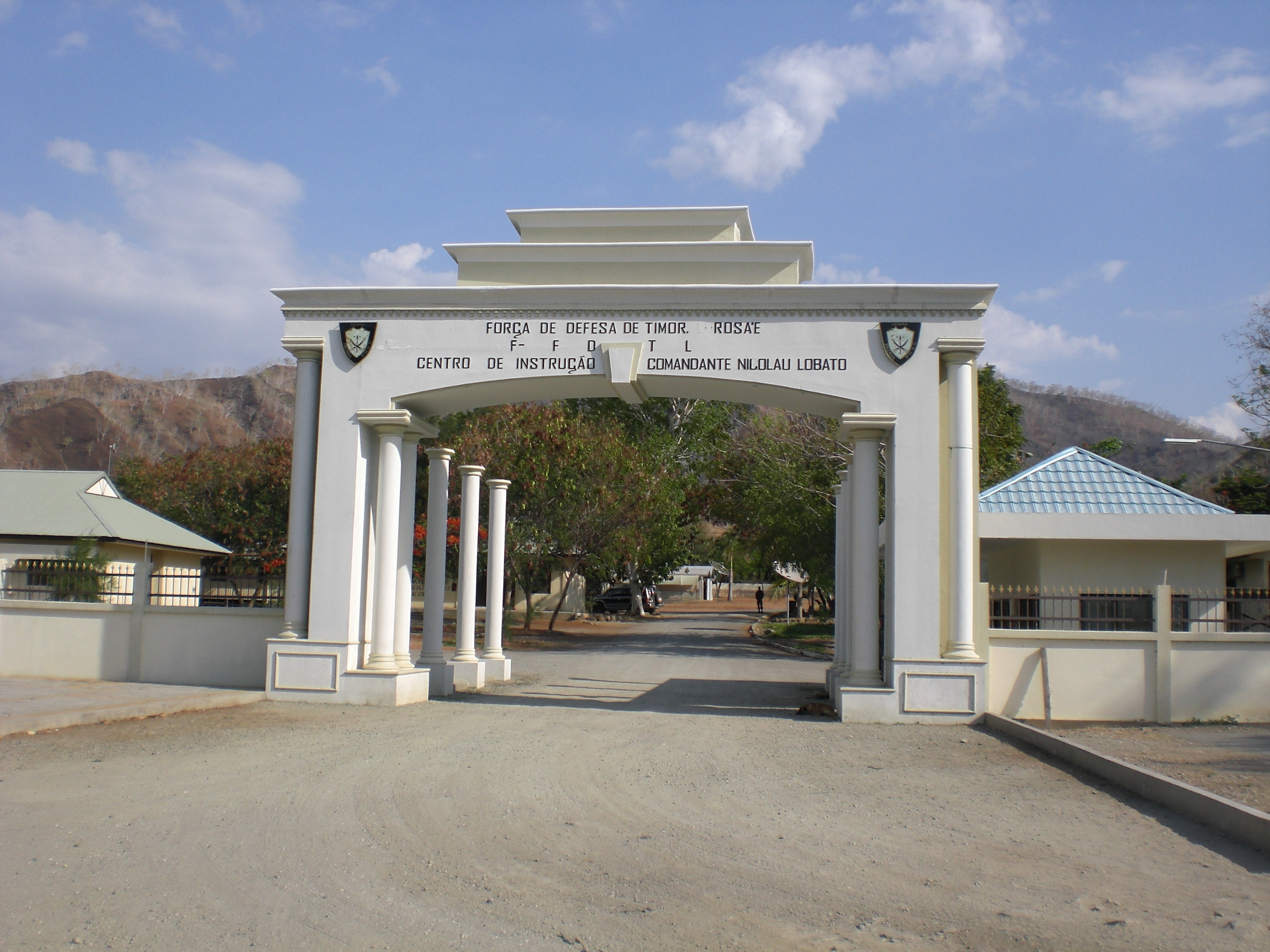
The gate to the F-FDTL Nicolau Lobato Training Centre near Metinaro

In 2004 the commander of the F-FDTL formed a team, which included international contractors, to develop a long-term strategic vision document for the military. This study was supported by the Australian Government. The resulting Force 2020 document was completed in 2006 and made public in 2007. The document sets out an 'aspirational' vision for the development of the F-FDTL to 2020 and beyond and is of equivalent status to a defence white paper. It proposes expanding the military to a strength of 3,000 regular personnel in the medium term through the introduction of conscription. It also sets longer-term goals such as establishing an air component and purchasing modern weapons, such as anti-armour weapons, armoured personnel carriers and missile boats, by 2020.

The Force 2020 plan is similar to option 1 in the King's College report. The King's College study team strongly recommended against such a force structure, labelling it "unaffordable" and raising concerns over the impact of conscription upon East Timorese society and military readiness. The team estimated that sustaining such a force structure would cost 2.6 to 3.3 per cent of Timor-Leste's annual gross domestic product and would "represent a heavy burden on the East Timor economy". Moreover, the Force 2020 plan may not be realistic or suitable as it appears to emphasise military expansion to counter external threats over spending on other government services and internal security and outlines ideas such as the long-term (~2075) development of space forces.<

While the Force 2020 plan has proven controversial, it appears to have been adopted by the East Timorese government. The plan was criticised by the United Nations and the governments of Australia and the United States as unaffordable and in excess of Timor-Leste's needs. East Timorese President José Ramos-Horta defended the plan, however, arguing that its adoption will transform the F-FDTL into a professional force capable of defending Timor-Leste's sovereignty and contributing to the nation's stability. East Timorese defence officials have also stressed that Force 2020 is a long-term plan and does not propose acquiring advanced weapons for some years.

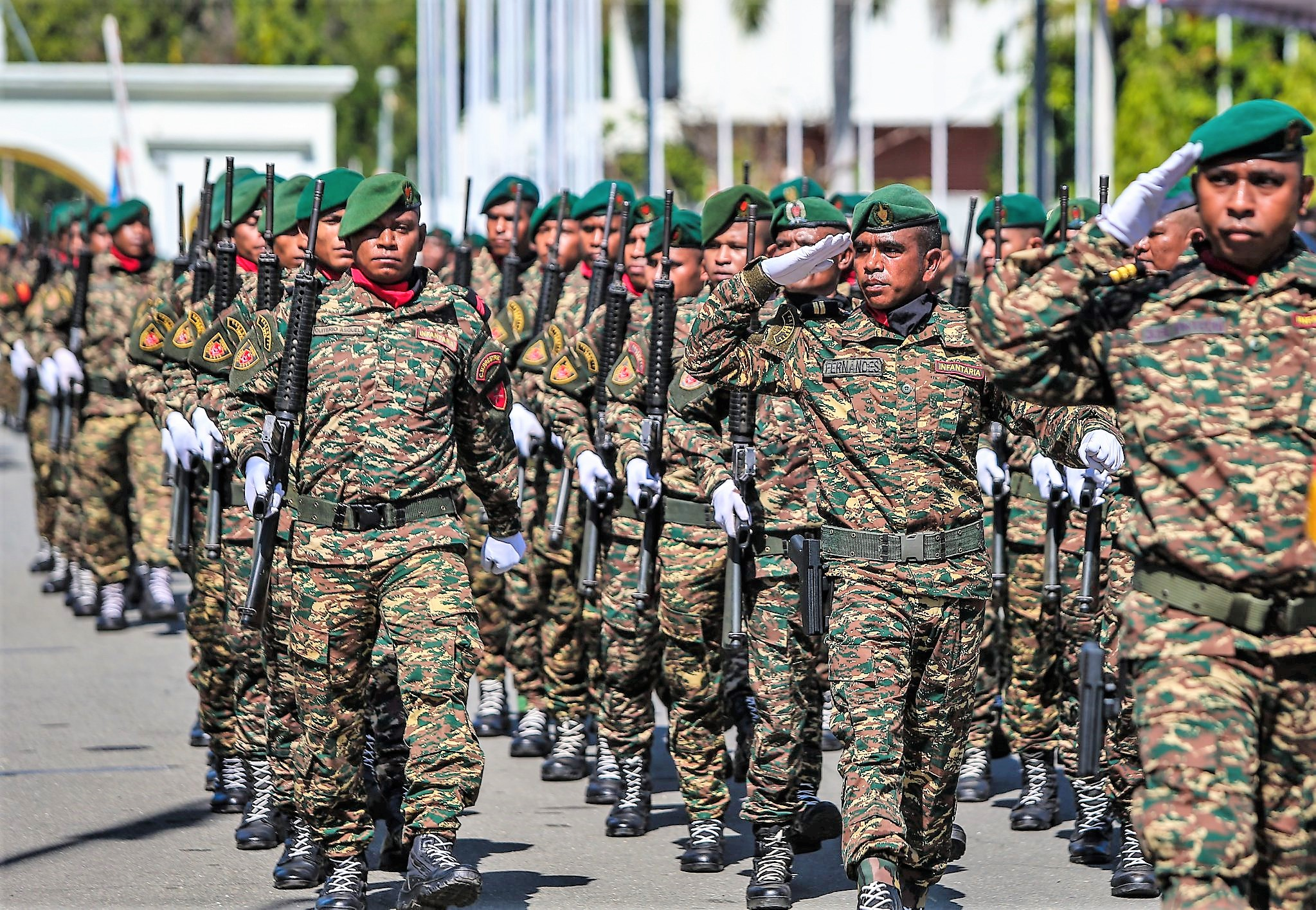
East Timorese soldiers during a parade in 2019

The repercussions of the 2006 crisis lasted for several years. On 11 February 2008, a group of rebels led by Alfredo Reinado attempted to kill or kidnap President Ramos-Horta and Prime Minister Gusmão. Although Ramos-Horta and one of his guards were badly wounded, these attacks were not successful and Reinado and another rebel were killed. A joint F-FDTL and PNTL command was established to pursue the surviving rebels and the military and police demonstrated a high degree of co-operation during this operation. The joint command was disbanded on 19 June 2008. While the joint command contributed to the surrender of many of Reinado's associates, it has been alleged that members of this unit committed human rights violations. More broadly, the shock caused by the attack on Ramos-Horta and Gusmão led to lasting improvements in cooperation between the F-FDTL and PNTL. In June 2008 the Government offered to provide financial compensation to the petitioners who wished to return to civilian life. This offer was accepted, and all the petitioners returned to their homes by August that year.

In May 2009, the F-FDTL accepted its first intake of recruits since the 2006 crisis. While the regional diversity of the 579 new recruits was generally much greater than that of the pre-crisis intakes, 60.3 per cent of officer candidates were from the country's eastern districts. From 2009 the F-FDTL established platoon-sized outposts to support the PNTL border police in the Bobonaro and Cova Lima border districts, and it has increasingly been deployed to undertake internal security tasks. From February to August 2010, 200 members of the F-FDTL were deployed to support PNTL operations against "Ninja" gangs. These troops undertook community engagement tasks, and were unarmed and not closely integrated with the PNTL efforts.

In 2011 the F-FDTL was still under-strength and yet to reform its training and discipline standards. Tensions within the F-FDTL also continued to threaten the stability of the force. However, the East Timorese government placed a high priority on re-establishing the F-FDTL and developing it into a force capable of defending the country. In 2012 the Government authorised an expansion of the F-FDTL to 3,600 personnel by 2020, of whom approximately one quarter will be members of the Naval Component. The 2016 edition of the International Institute for Strategic Studies' (IISS) publication The Military Balance stated that the F-FDTL was "only capable of internal and border-security roles".

The East Timorese Government published a new Strategic Defence and Security Concept during 2016. This document defined the role of the F-FDTL as defending the country against external threats and countering violent crime within Timor-Leste. The Strategic Defence and Security Concept also called for the F-FDTL's naval capabilities to be improved to adequately protect Timor-Leste's exclusive economic zone. In 2020 the IISS judged that the F-FDTL "has been reconstituted but is still a long way from meeting the ambitious force-structure goals set out in the Force 2020 plan". Similarly, a 2019 Stockholm International Peace Research Institute noted that there has been little progress in completing the acquisition program set out in the Force 2020 plan, likely due to a shortage of funds and "possibly also because there seems to be no rationale for acquiring some of the equipment".

On 29 October 2020, the Council of Ministers approved of a plan to start compulsory national service for Timorese citizens who are 18 years old and above.

In a 2023 journal article, the academic Deniz Kocak noted that the F-FDTL does not have a written doctrine, and the force's role was unclear. He observed that the F-FDTL continues to regard itself as the direct successor to FALINTIL and has a focus on guerrilla warfare.

== Command arrangements ==
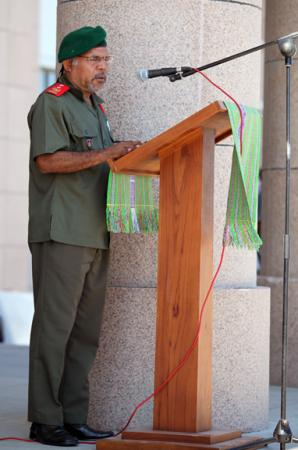
Major General Lere Anan Timor in 2012

The constitution of Timor-Leste states that the president is the supreme commander of the defence force and has the power to appoint the F-FDTL's commander and chief of staff. The Council of Ministers and National Parliament are responsible for funding the F-FDTL and setting policy relating to Timor-Leste's security. A Superior Council for Defence and Security was established in 2005 to advise the president on defence and security policy and legislation and the appointment and dismissal of senior military personnel. The council is chaired by the president and includes the prime minister, the defence, justice, interior and foreign affairs ministers, the heads of the F-FDTL and PNTL a national state security officer and three representatives from the national parliament. The council's role is not clear, however, and neither it nor the parliament served as a check against the decision to sack large numbers of F-FDTL personnel in 2006. A parliamentary committee also provides oversight of Timor-Leste's security sector. Major General Lere Anan Timor is the current commander of the F-FDTL, and was appointed to this position on 6 October 2011.

A small ministry of defence (which was renamed the Ministry of Defence and Security in 2007) was established in 2002 to provide civilian oversight of the F-FDTL. A lack of suitable staff for the ministry and the close political relationship between senior F-FDTL officers and government figures rendered this oversight largely ineffectual and retarded the development of Timor-Leste's defence policy up to at least 2004. The failure to institute effective civilian oversight of the F-FDTL also limited the extent to which foreign countries are willing to provide assistance to the F-FDTL and contributed to the 2006 crisis. As at early 2010 the Ministry of Defence and Security was organised into elements responsible for defence (including the F-FDTL) and security (including the PNTL), each headed by their own secretary of state. At this time the East Timorese Government was working to expand the ministry's capacity with assistance from UNMIT, but continuing shortages of qualified staff limited the extent to which the ministry could provide civilian oversight to the security sector. Moreover, elements of the F-FDTL were continuing to resist civilian control over the security forces at this time, and the force had not opened itself to international scrutiny.

== Organisation ==
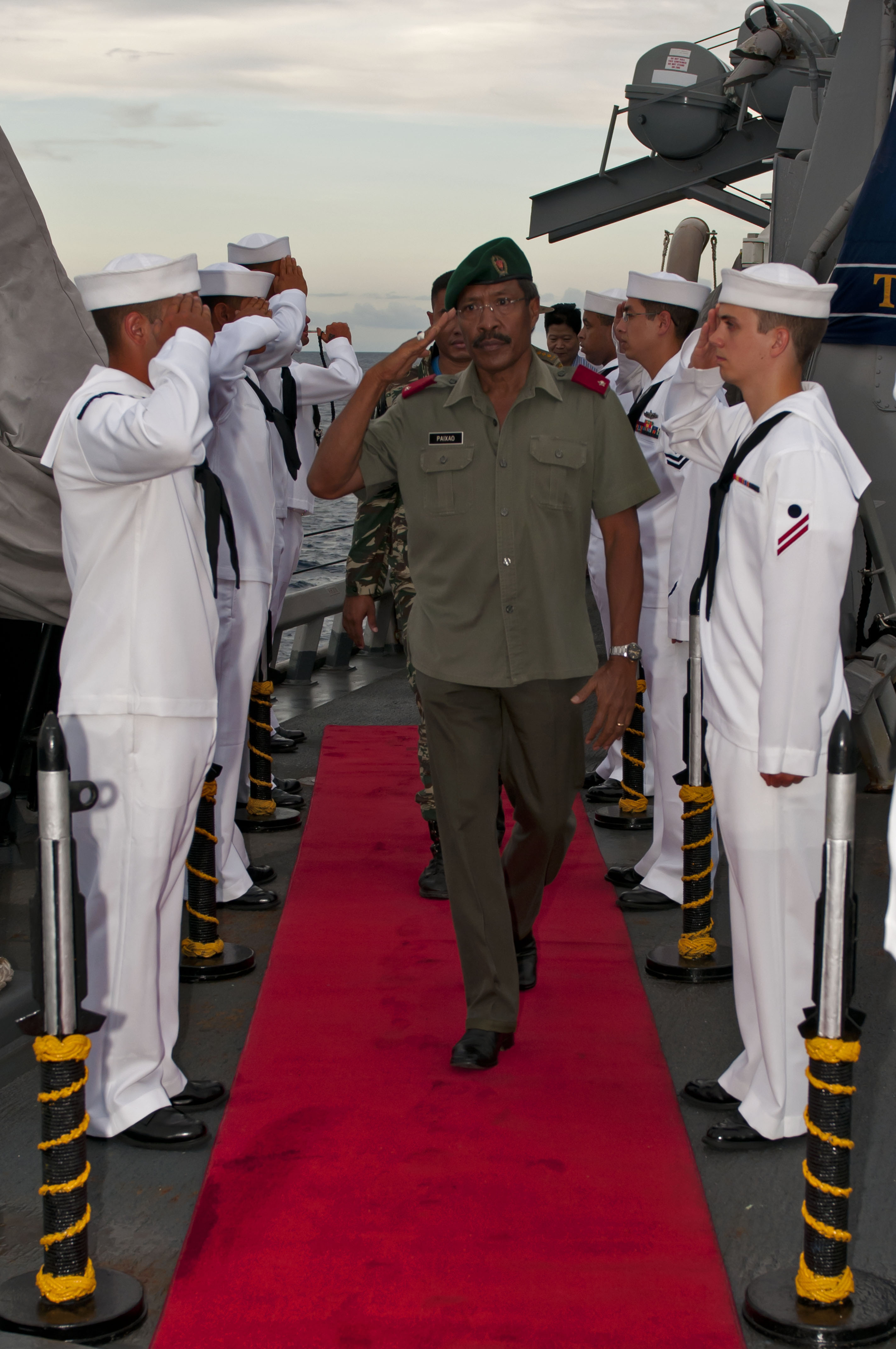
Brig. Gen Filomeno da Paixao, Vice Chief of Defence Force, aboard the USS Stethem.

The F-FDTL is organised into a headquarters, a land component, a naval component and an air component. The headquarters of the F-FDTL is the General Staff of the armed forces. A small number of F-FDTL units report directly to the Chief of the General Staff including the military police, special forces unit and the military hospital. Following its establishment the F-FDTL also had the "largest and most sophisticated" human intelligence network in Timor-Leste, which was based on the clandestine resistance reporting networks built up during the Indonesian occupation. However, in May 2008 the national parliament legislated to place the F-FDTL's intelligence branch under the authority of the head of the National Information Service.

In 2011 F-FDTL had an authorised strength of 1,500 regular personnel and 1,500 reservists. It had not reached these totals as funding shortfalls prevented the reserve component from being formed and the Army's two regular battalions were under-strength. While all the F-FDTL's personnel were initially FALINTIL veterans the force's composition has changed over time and few soldiers from the insurgency remained as of 2005 due to the force's narrow age requirement.

After the F-FDTL's 1st Battalion was established in 2001 recruitment was opened to all East Timorese above the age of 18, including women. Few women have joined the F-FDTL, however. As at February 2010, only seven per cent of new recruits were female. In 2020 women comprised 10.8 per cent of the F-DTL's personnel, with none holding a rank higher than captain.

=== Land Component ===
When initially established, the F-FDTL land force comprised two light infantry battalions, each with an authorised strength of 600 personnel. As of 2004 each battalion had three rifle companies, a support company and a headquarters company. Although the army is small, the guerrilla tactics employed by FALINTIL before the departure in 1999 of the Indonesian National Armed Forces were effective against overwhelming numbers and it has the potential to form a credible deterrent against invasion. The Army's current doctrine is focused on low-intensity infantry combat tactics as well as counter-insurgency tasks. Most of the force's training and operations are conducted at the section level, and company or battalion-sized exercises are rare.

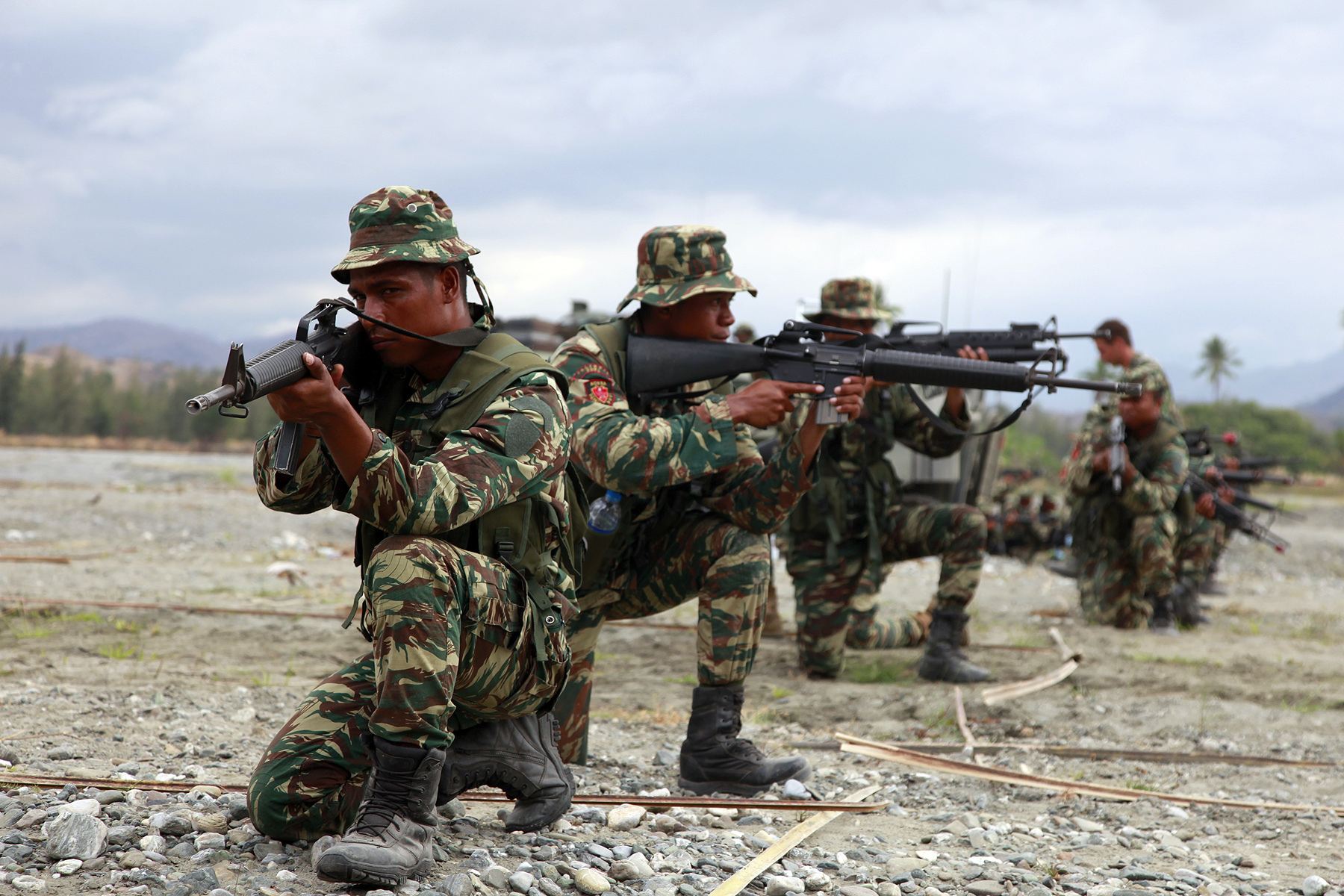
F-FDTL soldiers during a training exercise in 2012

Up until the 2006 crisis the land component's primary fighting units were two battalions, following the original idea of the Australian major-general whose suggestion it was. These units were located in separate bases. As of 2004 the 1st Battalion was based at Baucau, with a contingent in the seaside coastline village of Laga. In 2006 the 2nd Battalion was stationed at the Nicolau Lobato Training Centre near Metinaro. Almost all of the 2nd Battalion's soldiers were dismissed during the 2006 crisis. It should be clearly noted that the listing of personnel above after the 2006 crisis refers only to a "former" 2nd Battalion. The other major Army units are a military police platoon and a logistic support company. As of 2019, the F-FDTL was planning to raise a special forces company. The 2020 edition of The Military Balance stated that the Army had 2,200 personnel.

Logistics and service support is provided through Headquarters F-FDTL in Dili. The military police platoon polices the F-FDTL and performs traditional policing tasks, resulting in conflicting roles with the PNTL. The military police have also been responsible for presidential security since February 2007. In 2010 the United States Embassy in Dili reported that the F-FDTL also planned to raise two engineer squadrons during that year; these two units were to have a total strength of 125 personnel.

The F-FDTL is armed only with small arms and does not have any crew-served weapons. The 2007 edition of Jane's Sentinel stated that the F-FDTL had the following equipment in service: 1,560 M16 rifles and 75 M203 grenade launchers, 75 FN Minimi squad automatic weapons, 8 sniper rifles and 50 .45 M1911A1 pistols. A further 75 Minimis were to be ordered at that time. The majority of the F-FDTL's weapons were donated by other countries. An assessment of Timor-Leste's security forces published by the Centre for International Governance Innovation in 2010 stated that "F-FDTL weapons management and control systems, while superior to that of PNTL, are underdeveloped". The F-FDTL ordered eight lightly armed four wheel drive vehicles from China in 2007. Between 10 and 50 Malaysian Weststar GS trucks were delivered in 2014.

=== Naval Component ===
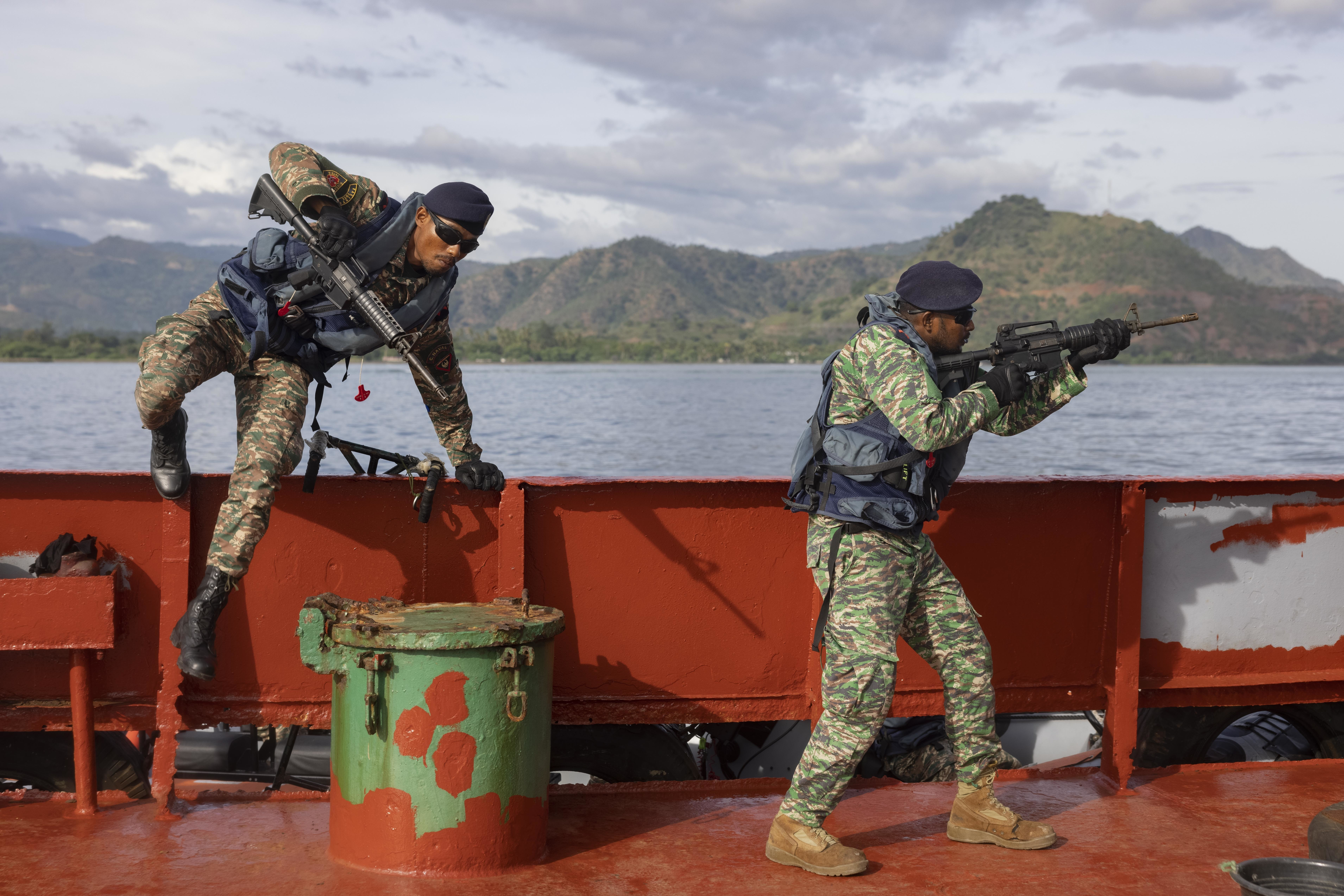
Two East Timorese marines practising boarding a ship in 2023

The Naval Component of the F-FDTL was established in December 2001 when Portugal transferred two small Albatroz-class patrol boats from the Portuguese Navy. Its establishment was not supported by the King's College study team, the UN, or Timor-Leste's other donor countries on the grounds that Timor-Leste could not afford to operate a naval force. The role of the naval component is to conduct fishery and border protection patrols and ensure that the maritime line of communication to the Oecussi enclave remains open. This is comparable to the role of the Portuguese Navy, which also undertakes military and coast guard functions. All of the force's warships are based at Hera Harbour, which is located a few kilometres east of Dili. A small base is located at Atabae near the Indonesian border. Under the Force 2020 plan the naval component may eventually be expanded to a light patrol force equipped with corvette-sized ships and landing craft.

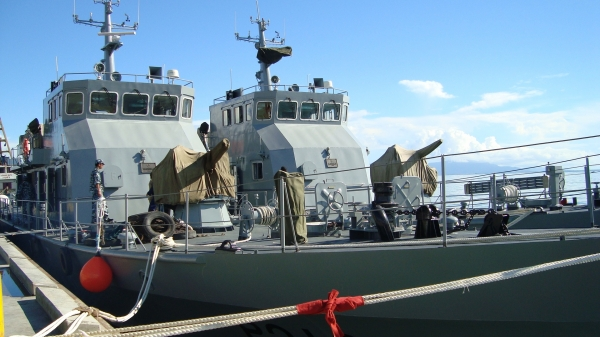
Both Jaco-class patrol boats in 2010

On 12 April 2008 Timor-Leste signed a contract for two new Chinese-built 43-metre Type 062 gunboats. These ships were to replace the Albatroz-class vessels and to be used to protect Timor-Leste's fisheries. The contract for the ships also involved 30 to 40 East Timorese personnel being trained in China. The two new patrol boats arrived from China in June 2010, and were commissioned as the Jaco class on the eleventh of the month. This acquisition was controversial in Timor-Leste due to a perceived lack of transparency regarding the purchase and concerns that the patrol boats were not suited to the rough sea conditions and tropical weather in which they would need to operate. The academic Ian Storey has written that "corruption may have played a part in the deal". The East Timorese government justified the purchase by arguing that the patrol boats were needed to safeguard the country's independence.

The South Korean Government donated one ex-Republic of Korea Navy Chamsuri-class patrol boat and two smaller patrol boats in 2011, and these entered service with the naval component on 26 September 2011. The East Timorese government also ordered two fast patrol boats from the Indonesian company PT Pal in March 2011 for the price of $US40 million.

The 2020 edition of the IISS Military Balance listed the naval component's size as 80 personnel. The 2011 edition of Jane's Sentinel put the strength of the naval component at 250; this source also stated that recruitment for an approximately 60-person strong Marine unit began in 2011 from existing naval component personnel, members of the Army and civilians. The Marines were to serve as a Special Operations force.

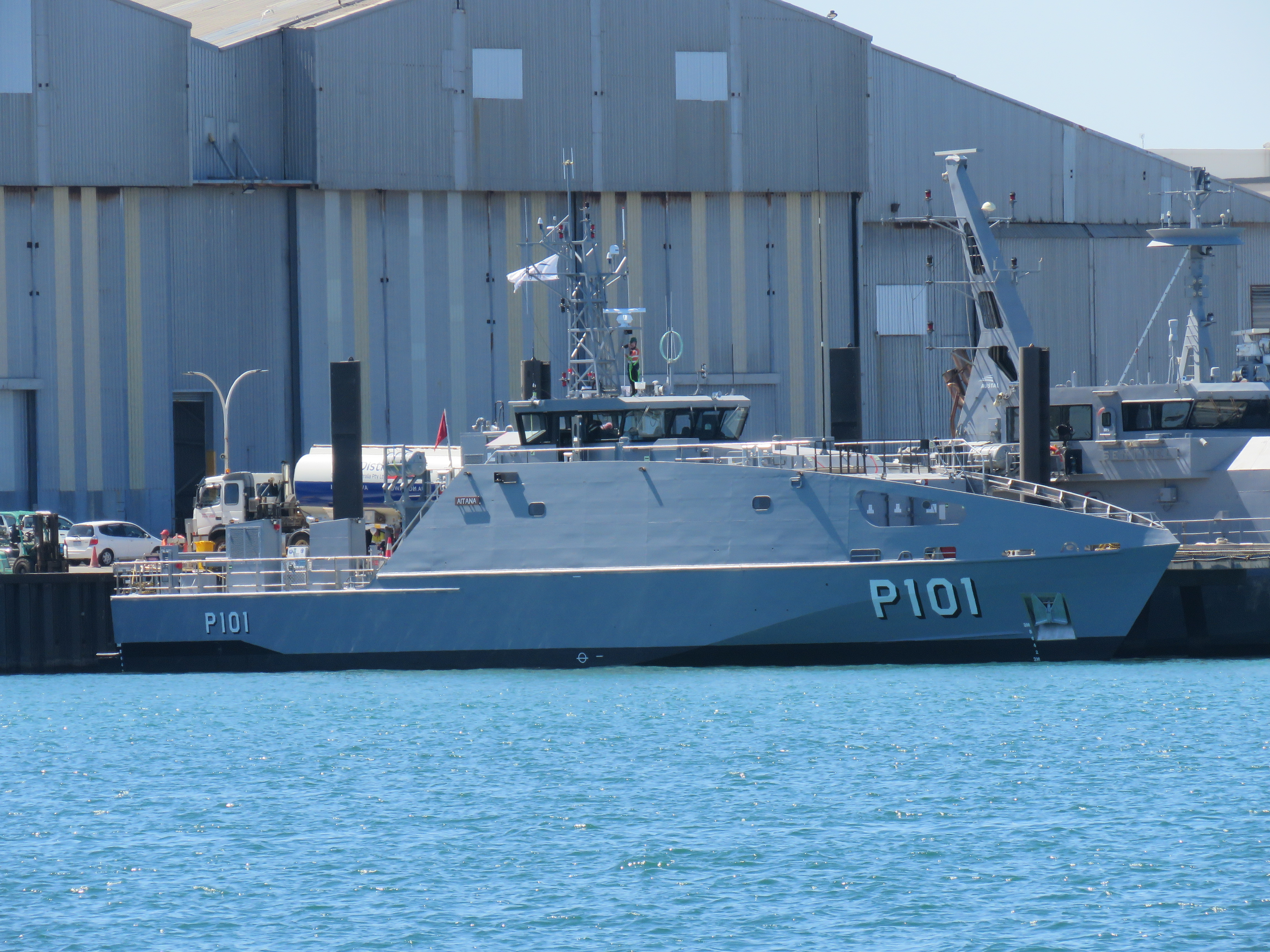
NRTL Aitana at Austal, Henderson, Western Australia, in December 2023

In 2017 Timor-Leste accepted an offer of two new Guardian-class patrol boats and associated training and logistics assistance from the Australian Government. The vessels are scheduled to be delivered in 2023, and will be named Aitana and Laline. Australia is also funding a new wharf at Hera Harbour that will enable operations of the two Guardian-class patrol boats.

=== Light Air Component ===
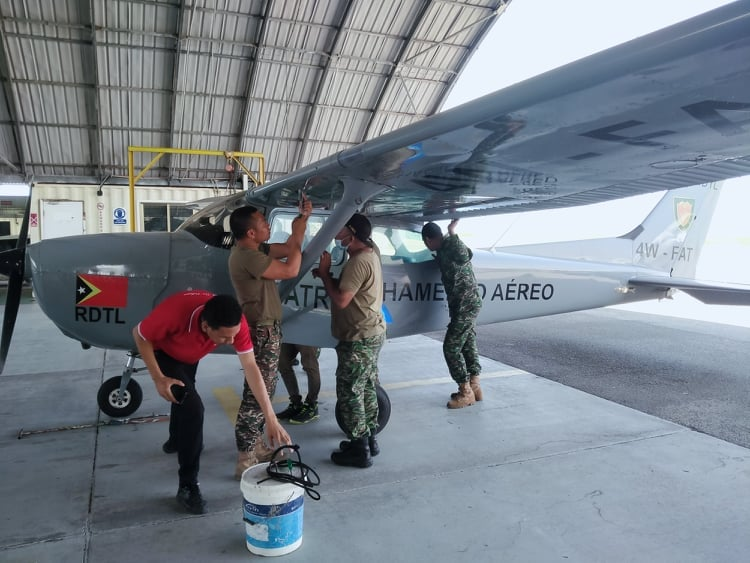
The F-FDTL Light Air Component's Cessna 172 in 2022

The Light Air Component of the F-FDTL was established in May 2018 when the Cessna 172P aircraft with registration number 4W-FAT was purchased from the United States by the Aero Dili for the F-FDTL. As of 2020, the F-FDTL's Light Air Component operated a single Cessna 172P aircraft.

In 2019, the East Timorese Government was considering purchasing three Chinese variants of the Mil Mi-17 helicopter. A small number of F-FDTL personnel were trained to operate the type in the Philippines.

The United States and East Timorese governments reached an agreement in June 2021, through which the United States will contribute funding to upgrade Baucau Airport to support F-FDTL and commercial operations and donate a Cessna 206 with registration number 4W-FAM to the F-FDTL. Rehabilitation work on the airport began in January 2022. The US military has stated that the purpose of this agreement is to support the creation of an Air Component to "help the Timorese government improve its maritime awareness, respond to natural disasters, and promote economic development". The Cessna 206 was handed over in June 2023.

=== Special forces ===
Since 2022, the F-FDTL special forces unit Unidade Falintil has reported directly to the Chief of the General Staff. The unit's size is equivalent to a company, with an authorised strength of 162 personnel who wear a green beret.

== Defence expenditure and procurement ==
Total defence expenditure for Timor-Leste in 2018 was $US29.1 million. This represented 2.7 per cent of gross domestic product (GDP). Timor-Leste is one of the few South East Asian countries to have not increased its defence spending between 2009 and 2018, with defence expenditure decreasing by 63.4 per cent in real terms over this period.

The modest size of the defence budget means that the East Timorese Government is only able to purchase small quantities of military equipment. Most of the F-FDTL's weapons and other equipment have been provided by foreign donors, and this is likely to remain the case in the future. No military production took place in Timor-Leste as of 2011. In 2020 the IISS noted that "maintenance capacity is unclear and the country has no traditional defence industry".

Funding shortfalls have constrained the development of the F-FDTL. The government has been forced to postpone plans to form an independent company stationed in the Oecussi enclave and two reserve infantry battalions. These units formed an important part of the King's College report's option 3 force structure and their absence may have impacted on Timor-Leste's defence policy. As of 2011 the government was yet to announce what, if any, reserve units would be formed, though provisions for such units had been included in legislation.

== Foreign defence relations ==
While the UN was reluctant to engage with the F-FDTL, several bilateral donors have assisted the force's development. Australia has provided extensive training and logistical support to the F-FDTL since it was established, and currently provides advisors who are posted to the F-FDTL and Ministry of Defence and Security. Portugal also provides advisors and trains two naval officers each year in Portugal. China provided US$1.8 million in aid to the F-FDTL between 2002 and 2008 and agreed to build a new US$7 million headquarters for the force in late 2007. Timor-Leste is one of Brazil's main destinations for aid and the Brazilian Army is responsible for training the F-FDTL's military police unit (Maubere Mission). The United States also provides a small amount of assistance to the F-FDTL through the State Department's International Military Education and Training Program. While Malaysia has provided training courses and financial and technical aid, this assistance was suspended after the 2006 crisis. As of 2010, Portugal provided the F-FDTL with basic and advanced training while Australia and other nations provided training in specialised skills. Timor-Leste and Portugal signed a defence cooperation treaty in 2017 which will remain in force until 2022. Australian and US support for the F-FDTL had been reduced to only occasional training by 2020.

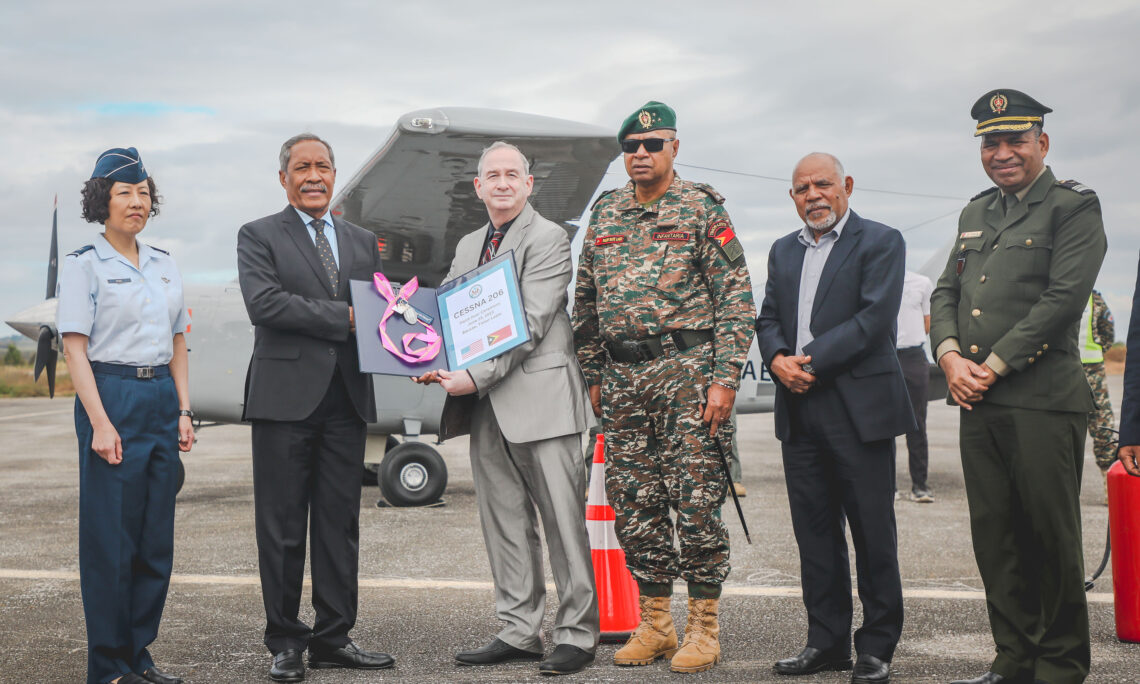
American and East Timorese military personnel and officials during a ceremony to hand over a Cessna aircraft to the F-FDTL Air Component in 2023

Timor-Leste and Indonesia have sought to build friendly relations since 2002. While movements of people and drug smuggling across their international border has caused tensions, both countries have worked with the UN to improve the security situation in the region. The East Timorese and Indonesian governments signed a defence agreement in August 2011 which aims to improve co-operation between their national militaries. The Timor-Leste–Indonesia Defense Joint Committee was also established at this time to monitor the agreement's implementation.. Additionally, in July of 2026 four cadets (taruna) from Timor-Leste completed their initial education and training program with the Indonesian National Armed Forces Akademi TNI, participating alongside 898 total Indonesian cadets in official graduation and closing ceremonies.

Timor-Leste ratified the Nuclear Non-Proliferation Treaty, Biological and Toxin Weapons Convention and Chemical Weapons Convention in 2003. The East Timorese Government has no plans to acquire nuclear, biological or chemical weapons. The country also became a party to the Ottawa Treaty, which bans anti-personnel mines, in 2003..

The East Timorese Government and F-FDTL are interested in deploying elements of the force on international peacekeeping missions. This is motivated by a desire to "give back to the international community". A platoon of 12 engineers was deployed to Lebanon between February and May 2012 as an element of a Portuguese unit which was serving with the United Nations Interim Force in Lebanon. Small numbers of F-FDTL specialists have been posted to the United Nations Mission in South Sudan (UNMISS) between 2011 and 2016 and since early 2020. For instance, three F-FDTL members served as observers with UNMISS in 2016. As of 2020, the F-FDTL was preparing plans to make larger peacekeeping deployments and Australia and Portugal were providing training for such missions.

== See also ==
- Military equipment of Timor-Leste
- Military ranks of Timor-Leste
