= Communist insurgency in Malaysia =

Communist insurgency in Malaysia may refer to:

- Malayan Emergency (1948–1960)
- Communist insurgency in Sarawak (1962–1990)
- Communist insurgency in Malaysia (1968–1989), also known as the Second Malayan Emergency
