= Jaco-class patrol boat =

Class of patrol boat

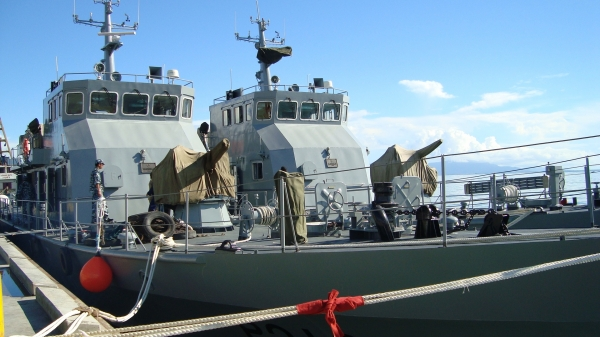
- Both Jaco-class patrol boats in 2010

Class overview
- Operators: Timor Leste Defence Force
- Succeeded by: Chamsuri class patrol boat Guardian class patrol boat
- In commission: June 2010 - present
- Completed: 2
- Active: 2

General characteristics
- Type: Patrol boat
- Displacement: 134 tons, full load
- Length: 127.3 ft (38.8 m)
- Beam: 17.7 ft (5.4 m)
- Draught: 5.6 ft (1.7 m)
- Propulsion: 2 x Type L12-180 diesels (forward), 2 x Type 12 D-6 diesels (aft), 4 shafts
- Speed: 30 knots (56 km/h; 35 mph)
- Range: 700 nautical miles (1,300 km; 810 mi) at 16.5 knots (30.6 km/h; 19.0 mph)
- Complement: 38
- Sensors & processing systems: Skin Head surface search radar
- Armament: 2 × 30 mm single mounts; 2 × 25mm/80 twin mounts
- Aviation facilities: None
- Notes: Data from

The Jaco class is a class of two patrol boats operated by the Timor Leste Defence Force's Naval Component. The boats were built in China to the Type 062 class gunboat (also known as the Shanghai II class) design. The two boats are named Jaco and Betano and were commissioned into East Timorese service in late June 2010.
