= Lere Anan Timur =

Timorese general (born 1952)

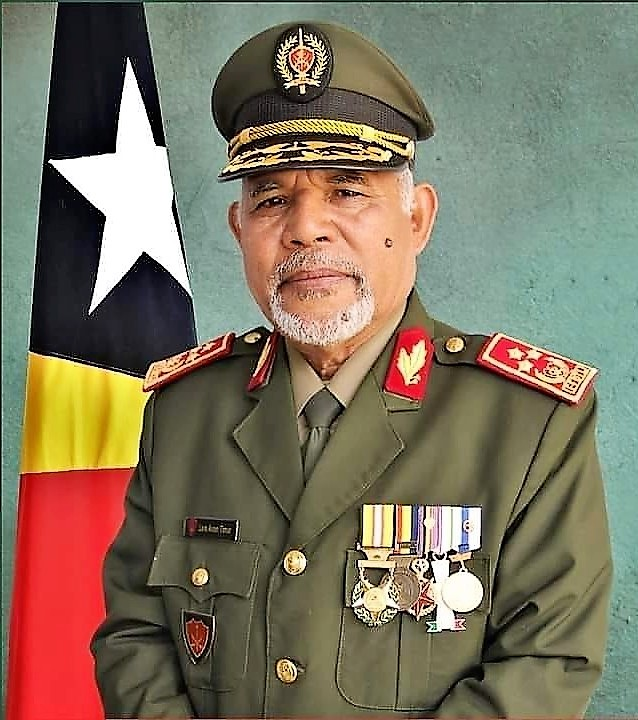
- Official portrait

Personal details
- Born: Tito da Costa Cristovão; 2 February 1952 (age 74) Iliomar II, Portuguese Timor
- Party: Fretilin
- Spouse(s): Elda Pinto (died 1981); Cidália Mesquita Ximenes
- Awards: Order of Timor-Leste; Medal of Merit; Halibur Medal

Military service
- Branch/service: Falintil / Timor-Leste Defence Force
- Years of service: 1975–2022
- Rank: Lieutenant General
- Unit: Commander, Timor-Leste Defence Force; Deputy Commander of the Timor-Leste Defence Force; Chief of Staff, Timor Leste Defence Force; Ponta Leste Sector; Centro Leste Sector
- Battles/wars: Indonesian invasion of East Timor; Operation Halibur

Tito da Costa Cristovão (born 2 February 1952), better known by his nom de guerre Lere Anan Timur, is an East Timorese general who has served as commander of the Timor-Leste Defence Force (F-FDTL) from 6 October 2011 to 28 January 2022. He is an independent candidate in the 2027 East Timorese presidential election.

== Background ==
He was born in an aristocratic family in Iliomar II at Lautem, and is the eldest of six siblings. He entered the military academy in 1965, and graduated in 1969. He also studied agriculture with the help of the Salesians of Don Bosco in 1969–1973, and served the Portuguese Army in 1974, before returning to East Timor in 1975.

He held various positions in the Falintil under the Fretilin, such as the political assistant for the Fretilin, and served during Indonesian invasion of East Timor. He served as commander of the Region 4 in 1984, became commander of the Centro Leste sector in 1987 and became commander of the Ponta Leste sector in 1993. He then serves as the Chief of Staff of the F-FDTL, and was promoted to Colonel by Taur Matan Ruak.

He became Deputy Commander of the Timor-Leste Defence Force in 2009, and was promoted to Brigadier General, until he was appointed as the Commander of the Timor-Leste Defence Force on 6 October 2011. His term was extended for three times since 2015.

== Awards and honors ==
- Order of Timor-Leste
- Medal of Merit
- Halibur Medal

== Personal life ==
He is married to Cidália Mesquita Ximenes, his second wife, whom he married after his first wife, Elsa Pinto, died from childbirth in 1981. They have 8 children, including 2 from his first wife.
