= Minister of State Administration (Timor-Leste) =

East Timorese government minister

- Ministro da Administração Estatal (Portuguese); Ministru Administrasaun Estatál (Tetum)
- Coat of Arms of Timor-Leste

- Flag of Timor-Leste

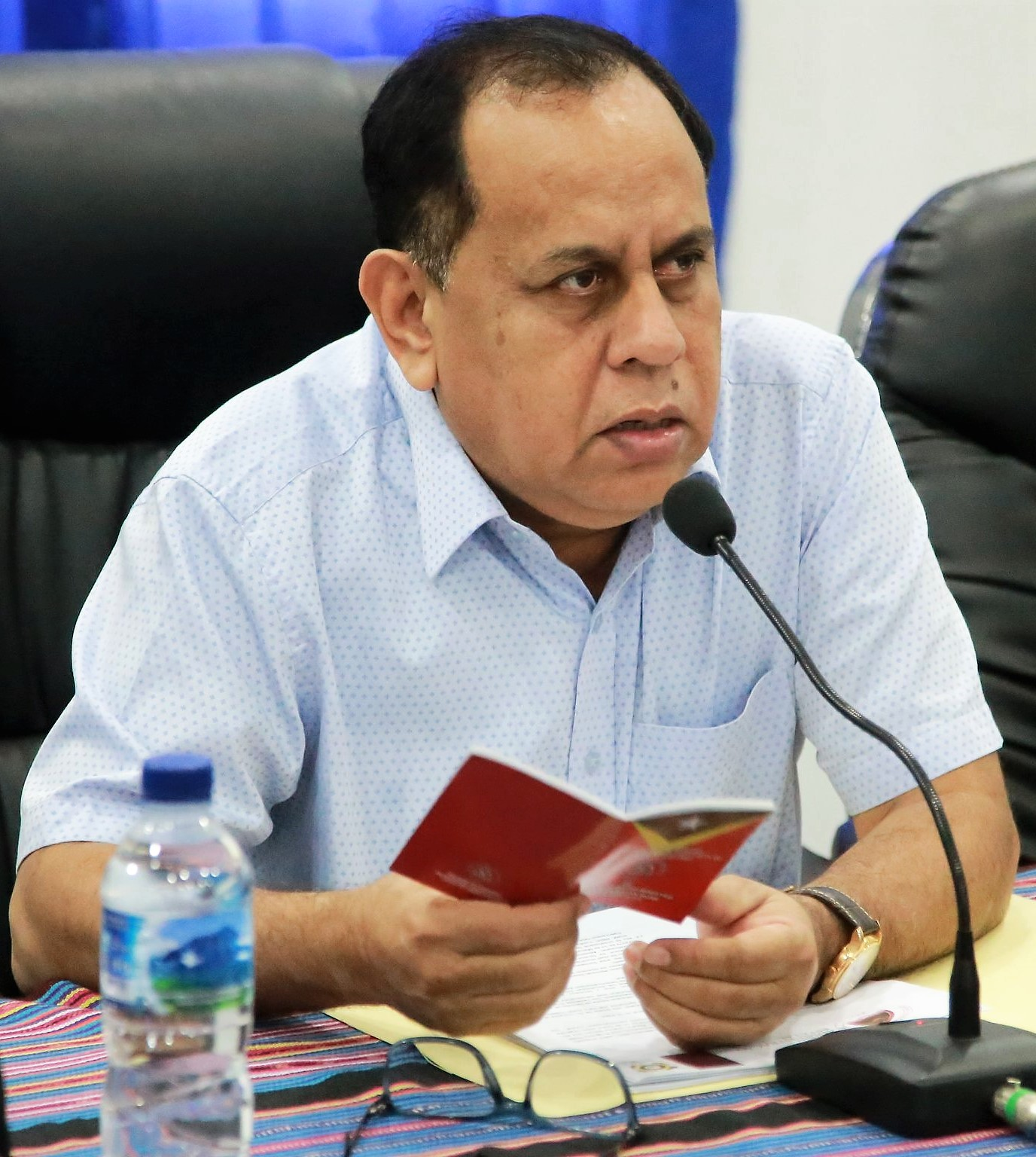
- Incumbent; Tomás do Rosário Cabral since 1 July 2023
- Ministry of State Administration
- Style: Minister; (informal); His Excellency; (formal, diplomatic)
- Member of: Constitutional Government
- Reports to: Prime Minister
- Appointer: President of Timor-Leste (following proposal by the Prime Minister of Timor-Leste)
- Inaugural holder: Ana Pessoa Pinto
- Formation: 2000
- Website: Ministry of State Administration

The Minister of State Administration (Portuguese: Ministro da Administração Estatal, Tetum: Ministru Administrasaun Estatál) is a senior member of the Constitutional Government of Timor-Leste heading the Ministry of State Administration.

== Functions ==
Under the Constitution of Timor-Leste, the Minister has the power and the duty:

1. to implement the policy defined for the Ministry of State Administration;
2. to ensure relations between the Government and the other organs of the State in the area of responsibility of the Ministry.

Where the Minister is in charge of the subject matter of a government statute, the Minister is also required, together with the Prime Minister, to sign the statute.

== Incumbent ==
The incumbent Minister of State Administration is Tomás do Rosário Cabral. He is assisted by Jacinto Rigoberto Gomes de Deus, Deputy Minister of State Administration. (Note: The Constitution of Timor-Leste provides, in sections 104 and 105, for the appointment of officials referred to in its English language version as "Deputy Ministers". In other English language publications, those officials are commonly referred to as "Vice Ministers", even though the word "Vice", in context, arguably has a different meaning in English from the word "Deputy". In this article, the constitutional expression "Deputy" is used.)

== List of ministers ==
The following individuals have been appointed as the minister:

| No. | Party | Minister | Portrait | Title | Government (Prime Minister) | Term start | Term end | Term in office |
|---|---|---|---|---|---|---|---|---|
| 1 | Fretilin | Ana Pessoa Pinto | | Minister for Internal Administration | I UNTAET (Vieira de Mello) | 15 July 2000 | 15 July 2001 | 1 year, 0 days |
| 2 | PD | Florindo Pereira | | Minister for Internal Administration | I UNTAET (Vieira de Mello) | 15 July 2001 | 20 September 2001 | 67 days |
| 3 | Fretilin | Antoninho Bianco | | Minister of Internal Administration | II UNTAET (Alkatiri) | 20 September 2001 | 20 May 2002 | 242 days |
| 4 | Fretilin | Rogério Tiago Lobato | | Minister of Internal Administration (to 4 Mar 2003); Minister of Interior (from 6 March 2003) | I Constitutional (Alkatiri) | 20 May 2002 | 26 July 2005 | 3 years, 67 days |
| (1) | Fretilin | Ana Pessoa Pinto | | Minister for State Administration | I Constitutional (Alkatiri) | 26 July 2005 | 10 July 2006 | 2 years, 13 days |
| (1) | Fretilin | Ana Pessoa Pinto | | Minister for State Administration | II Constitutional (Ramos-Horta) | 10 July 2006 | 19 May 2007 | 2 years, 13 days |
| (1) | Fretilin | Ana Pessoa Pinto | | Minister for State Administration | III Constitutional (da Silva) | 19 May 2007 | 8 August 2007 | 2 years, 13 days |
| 5 | PD | Arcângelo Leite | | Minister of State Administration and Territorial Planning | IV Constitutional (Gusmão) | 8 August 2007 | 8 August 2012 | 5 years, 0 days |
| 6 | FM | Jorge Teme | | Minister of State Administration | V Constitutional (Gusmão) | 8 August 2012 | 16 February 2015 | 2 years, 192 days |
| 7 | CNRT | Dionísio Babo Soares | | Minister of State Administration | VI Constitutional (Araújo) | 16 February 2015 | 15 September 2017 | 2 years, 211 days |
| 8 | Fretilin | Valentim Ximenes | | Minister of State Administration | VII Constitutional (Alkatiri) | 3 October 2017 | 22 June 2018 | 262 days |
| (acting) | CNRT | Abílio José Caetano | | Minister of State Administration | VIII Constitutional (Ruak) | 22 June 2018 | 29 May 2020 | 1 year, 342 days |
| 9 | Fretilin | Miguel Pereira de Carvalho | | Minister of State Administration | VIII Constitutional (Ruak) (restructured) | 29 May 2020 | 1 July 2023 | 3 years, 33 days |
| 10 | CNRT | Tomás do Rosário Cabral | | Minister of State Administration | IX Constitutional (Gusmão) | 1 July 2023 | Incumbent | 3 years, 69 days |
