= Minister of Petroleum and Minerals (Timor-Leste) =

East Timorese government minister

- Ministro do Petróleo e Minerais (Portuguese); Ministru Petróleu no Minerais (Tetum)
- Coat of Arms of Timor-Leste

- Flag of Timor-Leste
- Incumbent; Francisco da Costa Monteiro since 1 July 2023
- Ministry of Petroleum and Minerals
- Style: Minister; (informal); His Excellency; (formal, diplomatic)
- Member of: Constitutional Government
- Reports to: Prime Minister
- Appointer: President of Timor-Leste (following proposal by the Prime Minister of Timor-Leste)
- Inaugural holder: Mari Alkatiri
- Website: Ministry of Petroleum and Minerals

The Minister of Petroleum and Minerals (Portuguese: Ministro do Petróleo e Minerais, Tetum: Ministru Petróleu no Minerais) is a senior member of the Constitutional Government of Timor-Leste heading the Ministry of Petroleum and Minerals.

== Functions ==
Under the Constitution of Timor-Leste, the Minister has the power and the duty:

1. to implement the policy defined for the Ministry of Petroleum and Minerals;
2. to ensure relations between the Government and the other organs of the State in the area of responsibility of the Ministry.

Where the Minister is in charge of the subject matter of a government statute, the Minister is also required, together with the Prime Minister, to sign the statute.

== Incumbent ==
The incumbent Minister of Petroleum and Minerals is Francisco da Costa Monteiro.

== List of ministers ==
The following individuals have been appointed as the minister:

No.	Party	Minister	Portrait	Title	Government (Prime Minister)	Term start	Term end	Term in office
1	Fretilin	Mari Alkatiri		Minister of Natural and Mineral Resources, and Energy Policy	I Constitutional (Alkatiri)	26 July 2005	26 June 2006	335 days
2	Fretilin	José Teixeira		Minister of Natural and Mineral Resources, and Energy Policy	II Constitutional (Ramos-Horta)	10 July 2006	19 May 2007	1 year, 29 days
2	Fretilin	José Teixeira		Minister of Natural and Mineral Resources, and Energy Policy	III Constitutional (da Silva)	19 May 2007	8 August 2007	1 year, 29 days
3	CNRT	Xanana Gusmão		Prime Minister	IV Constitutional (Gusmão)	8 August 2007	8 August 2012	5 years, 0 days
4	CNRT	Alfredo Pires		Minister of Petroleum and Mineral Resources	V Constitutional (Gusmão)	8 August 2012	16 February 2015	5 years, 38 days
4	CNRT	Alfredo Pires		Minister of Petroleum and Mineral Resources	VI Constitutional (Araújo)	16 February 2015	15 September 2017	5 years, 38 days
5 (a)	PD	Mariano Assanami Sabino		Minister for Mineral Resources	VII Constitutional (Alkatiri)	15 September 2017	22 June 2018	280 days
5 (b)	Fretilin	Hernâni Filomena Coelho da Silva		Minister of Petroleum	VII Constitutional (Alkatiri)	15 September 2017	22 June 2018	280 days
(acting)	CNRT	Hermenegildo Ágio Pereira		Minister of Petroleum and Minerals	VIII Constitutional (Ruak)	22 June 2018	12 May 2020	1 year, 325 days
6	Fretilin	Víctor da Conceição Soares		Minister of Petroleum and Minerals	VIII Constitutional (Ruak) (restructured)	24 June 2020	1 July 2023	3 years, 7 days
7	CNRT	Francisco da Costa Monteiro		Minister of Petroleum and Minerals	IX Constitutional (Gusmão)	1 July 2023	Incumbent	3 years, 69 days
