= III Constitutional Government of Timor-Leste =

East Timorese cabinet led by Estanislau da Silva

III Constitutional Government
- III Constitutional Government of Timor-Leste

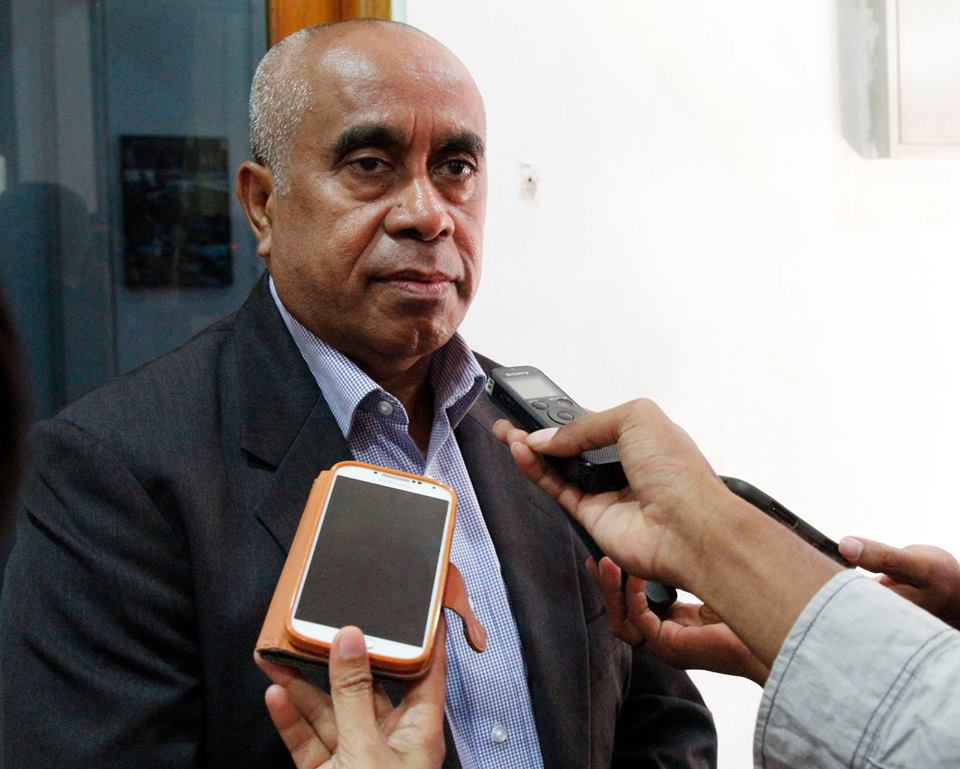
- Prime Minister Estanislau da Silva
- Date formed: 19 May 2007
- Date dissolved: 8 August 2007

People and organisations
- Presidents: Xanana Gusmão; (19 May 2007 – 20 May 2007); José Ramos-Horta; (20 May 2007 – 8 August 2007)
- Prime Minister: Estanislau da Silva
- No. of ministers: 1 Prime Minister; 13 other Ministers; 10 Vice Ministers; 8 Secretaries of State
- Member parties: Fretilin
- Status in legislature: Majority

History
- Election: 2001
- Predecessor: II Constitutional Government
- Successor: IV Constitutional Government

The III Constitutional Government (Portuguese: III Governo Constitucional, Tetum: III Governu Konstitusionál) was the third Constitutional Government (administration or cabinet) under the Constitution of Timor-Leste. Formed on 19 May 2007, it was led by the country's fourth Prime Minister, Estanislau da Silva, and was replaced by the IV Constitutional Government on 8 August 2007.

== Composition ==
The government was made up of Ministers, Vice Ministers and Secretaries of State, as follows:

=== Ministers ===
Party	Minister	Portrait	Portfolio
Fretilin	Estanislau da Silva		Prime Minister and Minister of Defence
Fretilin	Rui Maria de Araújo		Vice Prime Minister and Minister of Health
Fretilin	Ana Pessoa		Minister of State Administration
Fretilin	Maria Madalena Brites Boavida		Minister of Planning and Finance
Independent	Alcino Baris		Minister of Interior
Fretilin	Domingos Sarmento		Minister of Justice
Fretilin	Antoninho Bianco		Minister in the Presidency of the Council of Ministers
Fretilin	Rosária Corte-Real		Minister of Education and Culture
Fretilin	Arsénio Paixão Bano		Minister of Labour and Community Reinsertion
Fretilin	Francisco Benevides		Minister of Agriculture, Forestry and Fisheries
Independent	Arcanjo da Silva		Minister of Development
Independent	Odete Vítor		Minister of Public Works
Fretilin	Inácio Moreira		Minister of Transport and Communications
Fretilin	José Teixeira		Minister of Natural and Mineral Resources, and Energy Policy

=== Vice Ministers ===
Party	Vice Minister	Portrait	Portfolio
Fretilin	Valentim Ximenes		Vice Minister of State Administration
Fretilin	Filomeno Aleixo		Vice Minister of State Administration
Fretilin	Aicha Bassarewan		Vice Minister of Planning and Finance
Fretilin	Adalgiza Magno		Vice Minister of Foreign Affairs and Cooperation
Fretilin	José Agostinho Sequeira		Vice Minister of Interior
Fretilin	Víctor da Conceição Soares		Vice Minister for Technical and Higher Education
Fretilin	Ilda da Conceição		Vice Minister for Primary and Secondary Education
Fretilin	Luís Lobato		Vice Minister of Health
Fretilin	António Cepeda		Vice Minister of Development
Fretilin	Raúl Mousaco		Vice Minister of Public Works

=== Secretaries of State ===
Party	Secretary of State	Portrait	Portfolio
Fretilin	Gregório de Sousa		Secretary of State for the Council of Ministers
Fretilin	David Ximenes		Secretary of State for Veterans and Former Combatants
Fretilin	José Manuel Fernandes		Secretary of State for Youth and Sports
Independent	João Alves		Secretary of State for Environmental Coordination, Territorial Ordering and Physical Development
Fretilin	José Reis		Secretary of State for the Coordination of Region I (Lautem, Viqueque and Baucau)
Fretilin	Adriano Corte Real		Secretary of State for the Coordination of Region II (Manatuto, Manufahi and Ainaro)
Fretilin	Carlos da Conceição de Deus		Secretary of State for the Coordination of Region III (Dili, Aileu and Ermera)
Fretilin	Lino de Jesus Torrezão		Secretary of State for the Coordination of Region IV (Liquiça, Bobonaro and Cova-Lima)
