= II Constitutional Government of Timor-Leste =

East Timorese cabinet led by José Ramos-Horta

II Constitutional Government
- II Constitutional Government of Timor-Leste

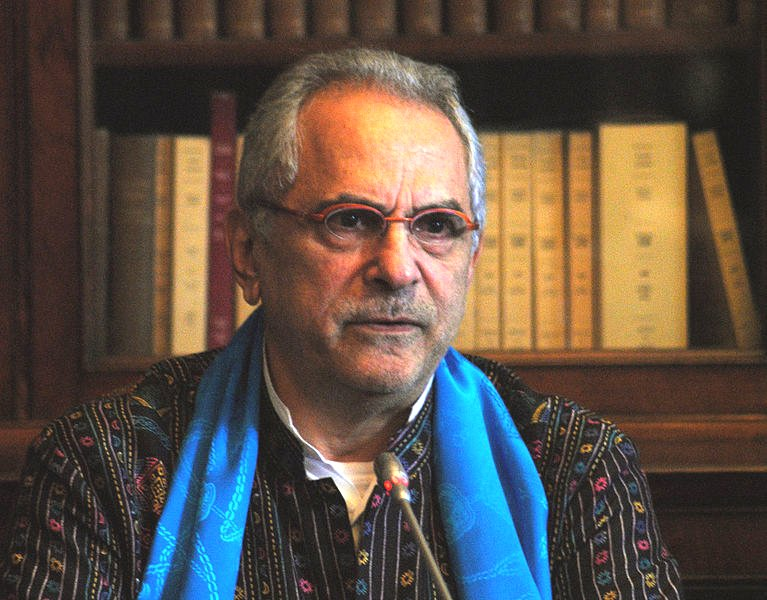
- Prime Minister José Ramos-Horta
- Date formed: 10 July 2006
- Date dissolved: 19 May 2007

People and organisations
- President: Xanana Gusmão
- Prime Minister: José Ramos-Horta
- No. of ministers: 1 Prime Minister; 14 other Ministers; 12 Vice Ministers; 9 Secretaries of State
- Member parties: Fretilin
- Status in legislature: Majority

History
- Election: 2001
- Predecessor: I Constitutional Government
- Successor: III Constitutional Government

The II Constitutional Government (Portuguese: II Governo Constitucional, Tetum: II Governu Konstitusionál) was the second Constitutional Government (administration or cabinet) under the Constitution of Timor-Leste. Formed on 10 July 2006, it was led by the country's third Prime Minister, José Ramos-Horta, and was replaced by the III Constitutional Government on 19 May 2007.

== Composition ==
The government was made up of Ministers, Vice Ministers and Secretaries of State, as follows:

=== Ministers ===
Party	Minister	Portrait	Portfolio
Independent	José Ramos-Horta		Prime Minister and Minister for Defence
Fretilin	Estanislau da Conceição Aleixo Maria da Silva		Vice Prime Minister and Minister of Agriculture, Forestry and Fisheries
Fretilin	Rui Maria de Araújo		Vice Prime Minister and Minister of Health
Fretilin	Ana Pessoa Pinto		Minister of State and Minister for Mineral Resources
Fretilin	Maria Madalena Brites Boavida		Minister of Planning and Finance
Fretilin	José Luís Guterres		Minister for Foreign Affairs and Cooperation
Independent	Alcino Baris		Minister of Interior
Fretilin	Antoninho Bianco		Minister in the Presidency of the Council of Ministers
Fretilin	Domingos Sarmento		Minister of Justice
Fretilin	Rosária Corte-Real		Minister of Education and Culture
Fretilin	Arsénio Paixão Bano		Minister of Labour and Community Reinsertion
Independent	Arcanjo da Silva		Minister of Development
Independent	Odete Vítor		Minister of Public Works
Fretilin	José Teixeira		Minister of Natural and Mineral Resources, and Energy Policy
Fretilin	Inácio Moreira		Minister of Transport and Communications

=== Vice Ministers ===
Party	Vice Minister	Portrait	Portfolio
Fretilin	Valentim Ximenes		Vice Minister of State Administration
Fretilin	Filomeno Aleixo		Vice Minister of State Administration
Fretilin	Adalgiza Magno		Vice Minister of Foreign Affairs and Cooperation
Fretilin	Aicha Bassarewan		Vice Minister of Planning and Finance
Fretilin	Francisco Tilman de Sá Benevides		Vice Minister of Agriculture, Forestry and Fisheries
Fretilin	Luís Lobato		Vice Minister of Health
Fretilin	José Agostinho Sequeira		Vice Minister of Interior
Fretilin	Víctor da Conceição Soares		Vice Minister for Technical and Higher Education
Fretilin	Ilda da Conceição		Vice Minister for Primary and Secondary Education
UDT	Isabel da Costa Ferreira		Vice Minister of Justice
Fretilin	António Cepeda		Vice Minister of Development
Fretilin	Raúl Mousaco		Vice Minister of Public Works

=== Secretaries of State ===
Party	Secretary of State	Portrait	Portfolio
Fretilin	Gregório de Sousa		Secretary of State for the Council of Ministers
Fretilin	José Manuel Fernandes		Secretary of State for Youth and Sports
Independent	João Batista Alves		Secretary of State for Environmental Coordination, Territorial Ordering and Physical Development
Fretilin	David Ximenes		Secretary of State for Veterans and Former Combatants
Fretilin	José Reis		Secretary of State for the Coordination of Region I
Fretilin	Adriano Corte Real		Secretary of State for the Coordination of Region II
Fretilin	Carlos da Conceição de Deus		Secretary of State for the Coordination of Region III
Fretilin	Lino de Jesus Torrezão		Secretary of State for the Coordination of Region IV
Independent	Albano Salem		Secretary of State resident in Oecussi
