= Hernâni Coelho =

East Timorese politician and diplomat

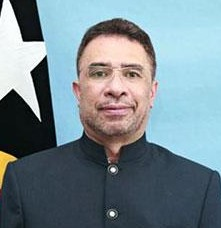

Minister of Petroleum
- In office October 2017 – 22 June 2018
- Prime Minister: Mari Alkatiri
- Preceded by: Alfredo Pires; (Petroleum and Mineral Resources)
- Succeeded by: Víctor da Conceição Soares; (Petroleum and Minerals)

Minister of Foreign Affairs and Cooperation
- In office 16 February 2015 – 15 September 2017
- Prime Minister: Rui Maria de Araújo
- Preceded by: José Luís Guterres
- Succeeded by: Aurélio Sérgio Cristóvão Guterres

East Timorese Ambassador to South Korea
- In office December 2013 – 12 February 2015

East Timorese Ambassador to Australia
- In office 29 March 2006 – November 2009

Personal details
- Born: 27 August 1964 (age 62) Uatucarbau, Portuguese Timor (now East Timor)
- Party: Fretilin
- Education: Jenderal Soedirman University (Unsoed); Islamic University of Malang (UNISMA)

Hernâni Filomena Maria Coelho da Silva (born 27 August 1964), also known by his nom de guerre Natan, is an East Timorese politician and diplomat, and a member of the Fretilin political party. He has been the East Timorese Ambassador to both Australia and South Korea. Between February 2015 and September 2017, he was Minister of Foreign Affairs and Cooperation, and from October 2017 to June 2018 he was Minister of Petroleum.

== Early life and education ==
Coelho was born in Uatucarbau, in the then Portuguese Timor, to Adelino da Silva from Ossu and Zulmira Celestina Faria Coelho. He has eight siblings, including the KHUNTO politician Lígia Filomena Coelho da Silva and the Socialist Party of Timor (PST) chairman Avelino Coelho da Silva.

From 1971 to 1975, Coelho attended elementary school and Catholic boarding school in Ainaro. In August 1975 he transferred to the Externato (day school) Bispo de Medeiros in the colonial capital, Dili. When the Indonesians conquered that city on 9 December of the same year, Coelho's family fled to Cabalaki, the mountain where the Fretilin base was located. Coelho's father was the party's regional secretary, and led the resistance against the Indonesians in Hato-Udo. When that area fell, the family returned to their homeland, Viqueque. There, Coelho's father ran a FALINTIL hospital and training centre for guerillas.

In October 1978, Coelho's entire family was captured by the Indonesians during the destruction of the FALINTIL resistance base at Matebian. After being captured, the family was first interned in Venilale, later removed to Ossu, and then finally taken to Dili. From 1980 to 1982, Coelho worked as a messenger for the East Timorese resistance, and in 1983, he joined the Catholic Youth Organisation of Timor-Leste (OJECTIL).

Also in 1983, Coelho left East Timor to study Agricultural Science, initially at the Agriculture Development College in Magelang, Central Java, Indonesia. Between 1986 and 1989, he continued his studies at the Faculty of Animal Husbandry (Fapet) of Jenderal Soedirman University in Purwokerto, Central Java, where he was also an assistant lecturer in 1988–1989. He then undertook further study in Animal Husbandry at the Islamic University in Malang, East Java, until 1992.

While studying in Java, Coelho was active in the Students' Front for the Liberation of Timor-Leste (FELETIL). In particular, he tried to bring East Timor's aspirations for independence closer to his Indonesian fellow students, and worked as a liaison between the resistance in East Timor (the Armed Front and the Clandestine Front) and the resistance cells abroad (the Diplomatic Front).

Following the Santa Cruz massacre in Dili in November 1991 and the collapse of most of the resistance movement in Indonesia and East Timor, Coelho became the Coordinator of the Special Bureau of the newly formed Timorese Socialist Association. The activities of the Association included mobilisation of support, operation of infiltration and propaganda and performance of rescue missions for East Timorese pro-independence activists and foreign supporters who were fleeing from the Indonesian military.

== Early career ==
After completing his doctorate, Coelho worked for Infovet Magazine in Jakarta from November 1992 to July 1993 as a journalist, sales manager and editorial assistant before he decided to return to Dili to work as a technical officer in the veterinary office. However, only two months later he was forced by the Indonesian military to leave East Timor, and went to Portugal. He then relocated to Macau, where he obtained his master's degree in Marketing and Strategic Management from the University of Macau (UM). In 1994, he was also elected regional secretary of Fretilin in Macau.

From November 1995 to July 1999, Coelho was employed by the Macau government as Senior Program Officer in the Department of Environmental and Public Sanitation. He then returned to Portugal, where from September 1999 to December 2002 he was Senior Research Officer at the Portuguese National Institute for Agricultural Research. In 2001, made a second homecoming to East Timor, this time at the request of the National Council of Maubere Resistance (CNRT) and worked for the CNRT as an advisor to the economic and infrastructure department until the CNRT was dissolved.

Coelho was then hired by the United Nations Transitional Administration in East Timor (UNTAET) and stayed there from May to November 2001. In December 2002, he took on the post of program officer of the United Nations Development Programme (UNDP) and in 2003 that of the head of the Department for Environment and Natural Resources, where he stayed until December 2005. He also taught agricultural science at the National University of East Timor (UNTL) from August 2001 to December 2005.

Meanwhile, in 2002, Coelho was elected President of the Association of UNDP / UNPOS / UNFPA Employees in East Timor, which was responsible for social affairs, training and representation of labour rights for East Timorese UN employees. In 2003, he was also appointed UNDP-Timor-Leste Learning Manager and was responsible for the training strategy of the East Timorese UN staff. In the same year, he joined the Fretilin technical cadre and supported the secretary of the Fretilin Central Committee in Dili. In 2005, he worked in Fretilin's information and mobilization department.

== Diplomatic and political career ==
In December 2005, Coelho was appointed as Acting Director for Bilateral Relations at the Ministry of Foreign Affairs and Cooperation. From 29 March 2006 to November 2009, he held the post of ambassador of East Timor in Australia. He was also accredited to other countries, such as New Zealand and Samoa. President José Ramos-Horta then appointed him as his Deputy Chief of Staff, in which position he remained until June 2012. In October 2013, he took up the post of ambassador of East Timor in South Korea.

On 16 February 2015, Coelho was sworn in as Minister of Foreign Affairs and Cooperation. Upon the formation of the VII Constitutional Government on 15 September 2017, he relinquished that office to Aurélio Sérgio Cristóvão Guterres, but on 3 October 2017, he was sworn in as the new Minister of Petroleum. His tenure as a Minister ended when the VIII Constitutional Government took office on 22 June 2018.

== Personal life ==
Coelho is married and has a daughter. He is fluent in Tetum, Portuguese, English and Bahasa Indonesia, and also speaks Cantonese, Javanese and Thai at a basic conversational level.

== Honours ==
Ribbon	Award	Date awarded	Notes
	Medal of the Order of Timor-Leste	18 May 2012	
