= Aurélio Sérgio Cristóvão Guterres =

East Timorese academic and politician

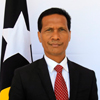

Minister for Foreign Affairs and Cooperation
- In office 15 September 2017 – 22 June 2018
- Prime Minister: Mari Alkatiri
- Preceded by: Hernâni Coelho
- Succeeded by: Dionísio Babo Soares

Member of the Council of State
- In office 2005 – 2007
- President: Xanana Gusmão

Personal details
- Born: 27 July 1966 (age 60) Venilale, Portuguese Timor (now East Timor)
- Party: Fretilin
- Spouse: Humbelina Sequeira De Carvalho Borromeu Duarte
- Children: Zelandini Borromeu Guterres, Alexandrino Rolandini Borromeu Guterres
- Education: Satya Wacana Christian University; Massey University

Aurélio Sérgio Cristóvão Guterres (born 27 July 1966) is an East Timorese academic and politician, and a member of the Fretilin political party. From September 2017 to June 2018, he was Minister for Foreign Affairs and Cooperation in the VII Constitutional Government of East Timor led by Mari Alkatiri.

== Early life and career ==
Guterres undertook the whole of his schooling at St Joseph's High School in Balide, Dili, from which he graduated in 1983. He then worked as a mathematics teacher at the school for two further years. In 1986, he left his teaching post to study law and development aid at the Satya Wacana Christian University (UKSW) in Salatiga, Central Java, Indonesia; he graduated with a bachelor's degree.

In 1991, Guterres returned to East Timor and became a teacher at the Universitas Timor Timur (UnTim) (now the National University of East Timor (UNTL)), in the Faculty of Social and Political Sciences (Fisipol). Between 1993 and 1995, he completed a further bachelor's degree at Massey University in Palmerston North, New Zealand. He also obtained a master's degree and a PhD in Development Studies, for which he studied from 2000 to 2003, also at Massey University.

By the end of 2010, when Guterres was appointed Rector of UNTL, he had been a university teacher for 18 years. He had also served as a consultant to several national and international organizations. Guterres had close contacts with Finland and was therefore an agent for Finnish development aid in East Timor. Additionally, he was an advisor to Bakornas, the National Council for Disaster Coordination, a member of the East Timorese Petroleum Organization, and from 2010 to 2014 a member of the Executive Council of the East Timorese Red Cross (CVTL). He served as Rector of the UNTL until 2016.

== Political career ==
From 2005 to 2007, Guterres was one of the five members of the Council of State elected by the National Parliament.

On 15 September 2017, Guterres was sworn in as Minister for Foreign Affairs and Cooperation in the VII Constitutional Government. As that Fretilin / PD minority administration could not prevail in the National Parliament, the President of East Timor dissolved the Parliament and called a fresh parliamentary election. Guterres's tenure as a Minister ended when the VIII Constitutional Government took office on 22 June 2018. He continues to teach at UNTL.

== Personal life ==
Guterres speaks Portuguese, English, Indonesian, and Tetum. He is married to Humbelina Sequeira De Carvalho Borromeu Duarte, and the couple has three children.

== Publications ==
- Internal migration and development in East Timor (Palmerston North: PhD thesis, Massey University, 2003)
