= Víctor da Conceição Soares =

East Timorese politician and academic

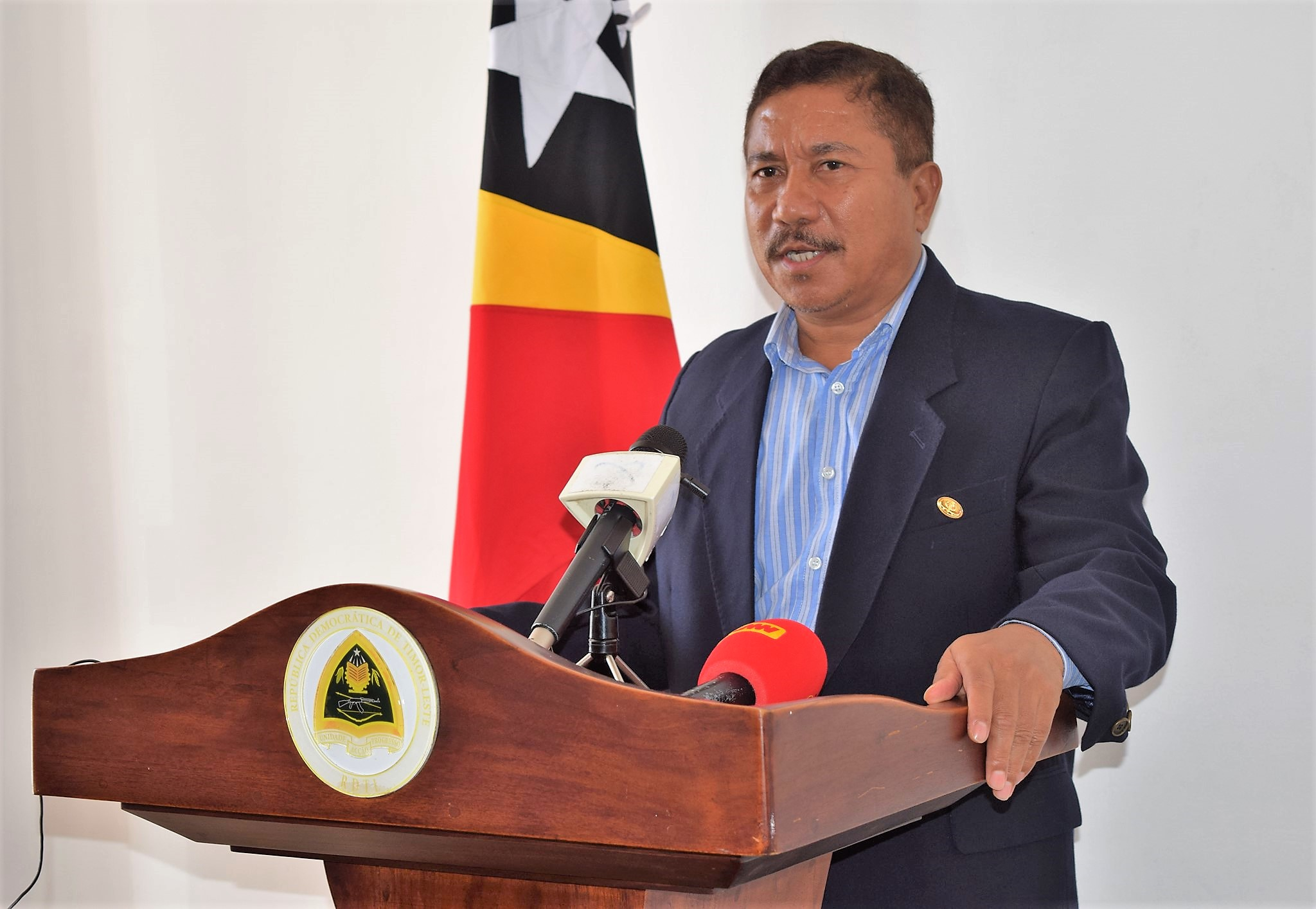
- Soares in 2020

Minister of Petroleum and Minerals
- In office 24 June 2020 – 1 July 2023
- Prime Minister: Taur Matan Ruak
- Preceded by: Hernâni Coelho; (Petroleum); Mariano Sabino Lopes; (Mineral Resources)
- Succeeded by: Francisco da Costa Monteiro

Deputy Minister for Technical and Higher Education
- In office 10 July 2006 – 8 August 2007
- Prime Minister: José Ramos-Horta; (to 19 May 2007); Estanislau da Silva; (from 19 May 2007)
- Preceded by: Office created
- Succeeded by: Office abolished

Personal details
- Born: Baucau, Portuguese Timor; (now East Timor)
- Party: Fretilin
- Education: Bandung Institute of Technology; Widya Karya Catholic University; Nagaoka University of Technology; University of Évora

Víctor da Conceição Soares is an East Timorese politician and academic, and a member of the Fretilin political party. From June 2020 to July 2023, he was Minister of Petroleum and Minerals, serving in the VIII Constitutional Government of East Timor led by Prime Minister Taur Matan Ruak.

== Early life and career ==
Soares is originally from Baucau, in eastern East Timor. In 1992, he obtained a bachelor's degree in mechanical production from Bandung Institute of Technology, Indonesia. In 1999, he was awarded an honours degree in mechanical engineering from Widya Karya Catholic University, Indonesia, and in 2004, he completed a master's degree in mechanical engineering from Nagaoka University of Technology, Japan. Since then, he has obtained a PhD in technical science of territorial planning and environment from the University of Évora, Portugal, majoring in biosystems engineering and renewable energy-wind power.

From 1999 to 2001, Soares served as a UN local staff member in East Timor, and was the Supervisor for UNAMET-UNTAET Security Services. Since 2000, he has been a lecturer in mechanical engineering at the National University of East Timor (UNTL), and has also been a researcher in mechanical engineering and renewable energy, including wind power. From 2007 until 2010, he was Dean of the Faculty of Technical Engineering at UNTL.

== Political career ==
From 10 July 2006 to 8 August 2007, Soares was also Deputy Minister for Technical and Higher Education (Note: The Constitution of East Timor provides, in sections 104 and 105, for the appointment of officials referred to in its English language version as "Deputy Ministers". In other English language publications, those officials are commonly referred to as "Vice Ministers", even though the word "Vice", in context, arguably has a different meaning in English from the word "Deputy". In this article, the constitutional expression "Deputy" is used.) in the II Constitutional Government under Prime Minister José Ramos-Horta, and the III Constitutional Government led by Prime Minister Estanislau da Silva, respectively.

Soares was later appointed as an advisor to the East Timor Coffee Academy (ETICA) (now the East Timor Coffee Institute). From 2017 to 2020, he was a Member of UNTL General Council, and a Member of the Scientific Council of the National Institute for Science and Technology (Portuguese: Instituto Nacional de Ciência e Tecnologia (INCT)).

On 24 June 2020, following a change in the governing coalition, and the admission of Fretilin to the VIII Constitutional Government, Soares was sworn in as Minister of Petroleum and Minerals.

Soares took that office intending to undertake a restructuring of East Timor's oil and gas sector, with the objective of improving the quality of the services provided in that sector. Soon afterwards, as part of a new policy of limiting the time that any person would hold a position in public administration, he controversially replaced two long serving executives, Francisco da Costa Monteiro as the chief executive of Timor Gap, E.P., and Gualdino da Silva as the President of National Petroleum & Minerals Authority. Additionally, the proposal for the Tasi Mane LNG project was sent to the national audit office for re-evaluation.

In an interview published at the end of August 2020, Soares said that oil and gas industry strategy had given priority to policy ahead of technical issues and economic viability, and that the strategy had to be reversed. He also claimed that the government had made a big mistake in investing in the Greater Sunrise consortium, and that the investment had been a purely political decision, not based on the technical analysis of the company or the technicians.

Soares' tenure as Minister ended when the IX Constitutional Government took office on 1 July 2023. He was succeeded by Francisco da Costa Monteiro.

== Honours ==
In 2000, Soares was awarded a UN Certificate as a UNAMET Staff Member, and in 2013 he was decorated by the government of East Timor as a Combatant of National Liberation.
