= Miguel Pereira de Carvalho =

East Timorese politician and public administrator

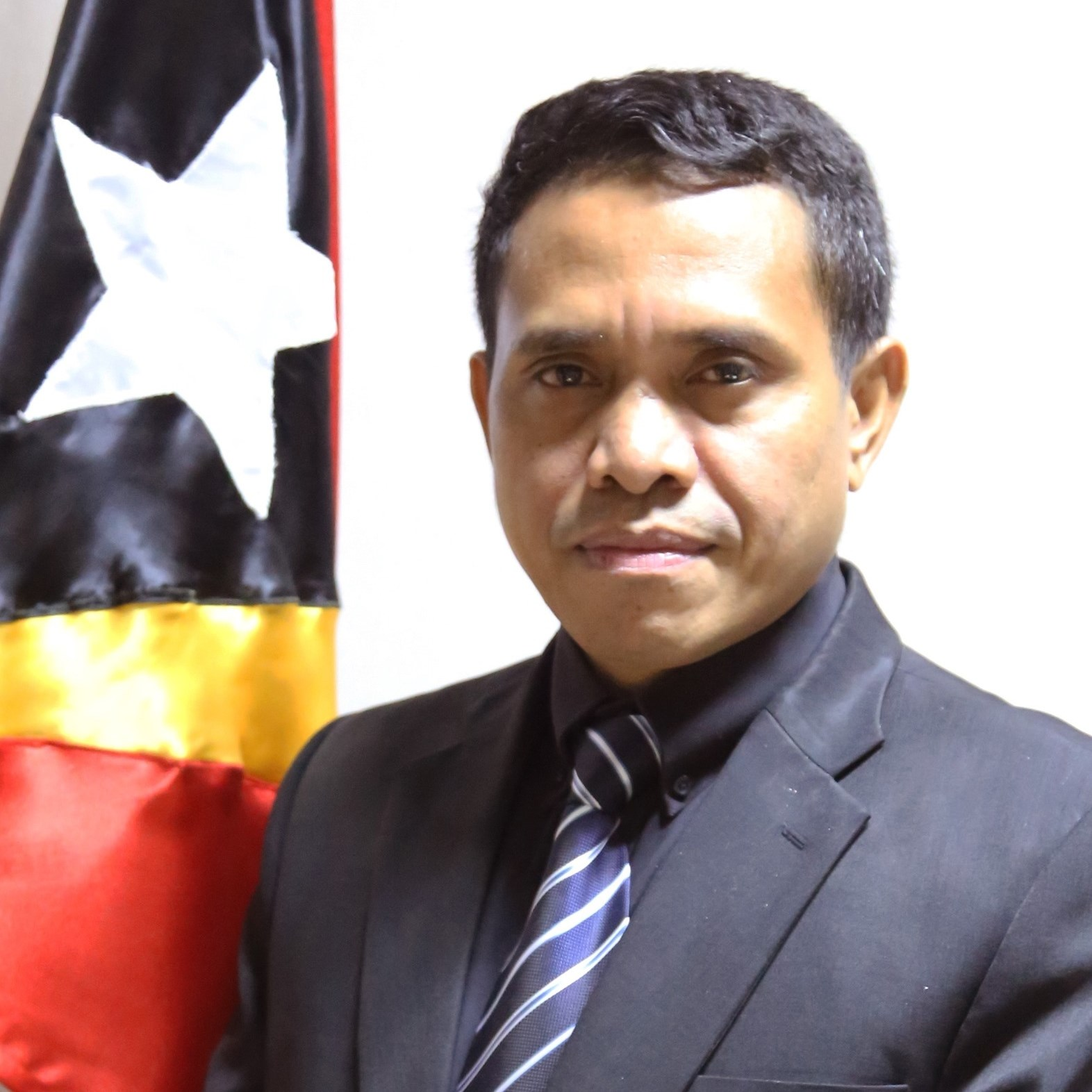
- Carvalho in 2020

Minister of State Administration
- In office 29 May 2020 – 1 July 2023
- Prime Minister: Taur Matan Ruak
- Preceded by: Office re-established
- Succeeded by: Tomás do Rosário Cabral

Personal details
- Born: 6 September 1976 (age 49) Dili, East Timor, Indonesia
- Party: Fretilin
- Education: Institute of Governance of Home Affairs; Macquarie University

Miguel Pereira de Carvalho (born 6 September 1976) is an East Timorese politician and public administrator, and a member of the Fretilin political party.

From May 2020 to July 2023, he was the Minister of State Administration, serving in the VIII Constitutional Government of East Timor led by Prime Minister Taur Matan Ruak.

== Early life and career ==
Carvalho was born in Dili, in the then Indonesian province of East Timor. He began his tertiary studies at Sekolah Tinggi Pemerintahan Dalam Negeri (STPDN) (now the Institut Pemerintahan Dalam Negeri (IPDN) (English: Institute of Governance of Home Affairs)), in West Java, Indonesia. In 2003, he completed a Masters of Politics and Public Policy degree at Macquarie University in Sydney, Australia.

During the Indonesian occupation of East Timor, Carvalho worked in the administration of the then Bobonaro district, beginning in July 1998 and ending in September 1999. Following the departure of the Indonesians in 1999, he worked at the United Nations Transitional Administration in East Timor (UNTAET) as Treasury Officer in the Ministry of Finance and for the UNTAET Health and Social Service Agency.

After East Timor became independent in 2002, Carvalho was National Human Resources Advisor at the Department of Justice from February to April 2003, and Consular Assistant at the Australian Embassy in East Timor from May to August 2003. He then served as Project Officer for the Training Development Coordination Unit in the Prime Minister's Office from September to November 2003.

In December 2003, Carvalho started working in the Ministry of State Administration. There, he served in the positions of National Director of Administration and Finance (December 2003 - March 2008), National Director of Local Development and Spatial Planning (April 2008 – March 2011), National Director of Planning, Evaluation and External Cooperation (April 2011 – April 2013), Director General for Local Development (April 2013 – July 2015) and Director General of Urban Management (July 2015 – February 2019).

On 28 February 2019, Carvalho was appointed Deputy Provedor of the Office of the Provedor for Human Rights and Justice (Portuguese: Provedoria dos Direitos Humanos e Justiça (PDHJ)), in the area of Good Governance. He succeeded Jesuina Maria Ferreira Gomes, who became the new ombudswoman of the PDHJ.

== Political career ==
On 29 May 2020, as part of the admission of Fretilin members to the VIII Constitutional Government, Carvalho was sworn in as Minister of State Administration. In that capacity, he was also responsible for the coordination functions of the Mission Unit for Civil Protection and Natural Disaster Management.

Carvalho's tenure as Minister ended when the IX Constitutional Government took office on 1 July 2023. He was succeeded by Tomás do Rosário Cabral.

== Honours ==
Award	Date awarded	Notes
Medal of the Order of Merit of Public Service	15 July 2017	
