= Ministry of State Administration (Timor-Leste) =

Ministry in the government of Timor-Leste

- Ministério da Administração Estatal (Portuguese); Ministériu Administrasaun Estatál (Tetum)
- Coat of Arms of Timor-Leste

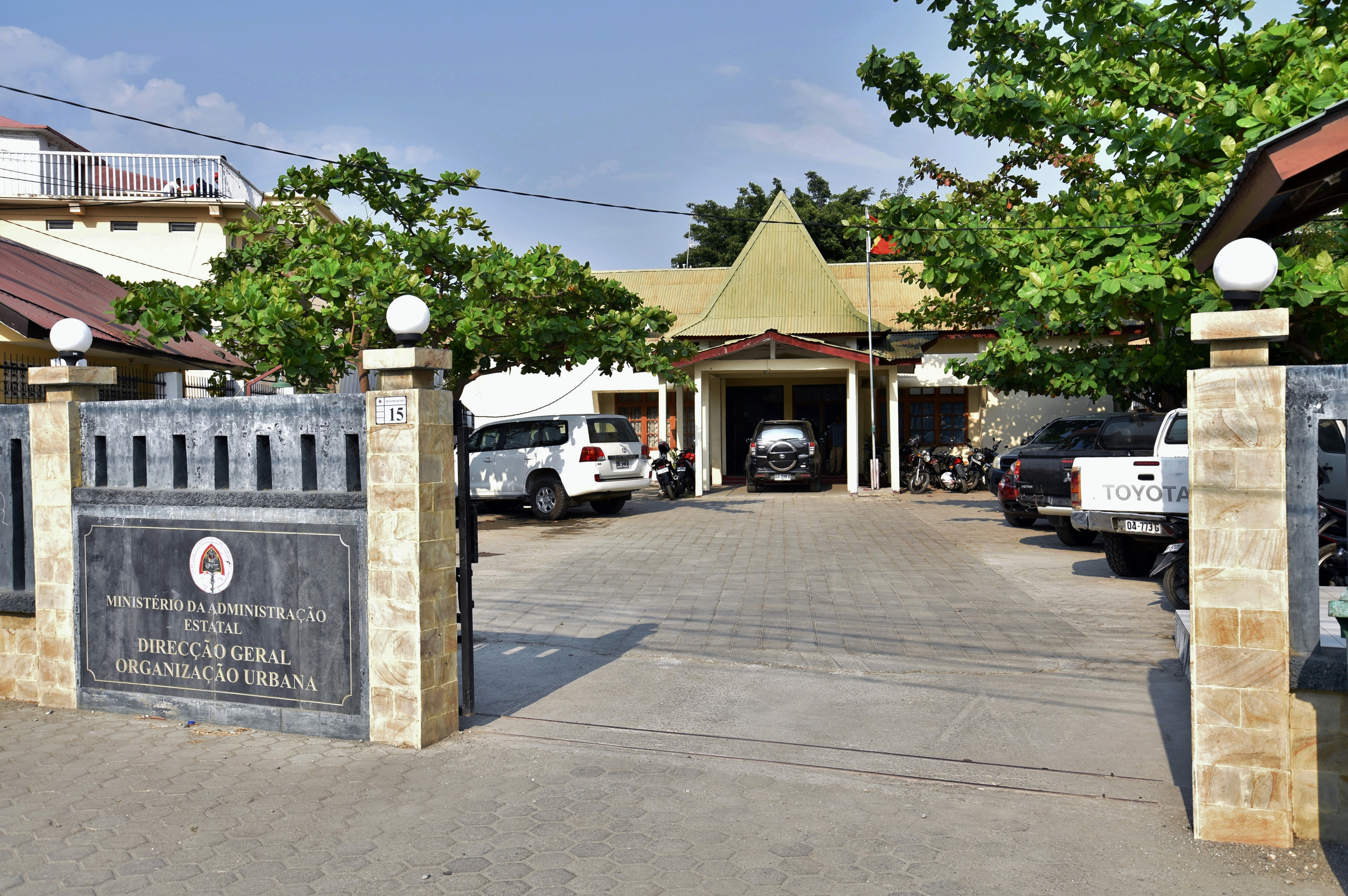
- General Directorate of Urban Organization, Dili

Ministry overview
- Formed: 2007
- Jurisdiction: Government of Timor-Leste
- Headquarters: Rua 20 de Maio, nº43, Dili; 8°33′25″S 125°34′26″E
- Minister responsible: Tomás do Rosário Cabral, Minister of State Administration
- Deputy Minister responsible: Jacinto Rigoberto Gomes de Deus, Deputy Minister of State Administration
- Website: Ministry of State Administration
- Agency ID: MAE
- Ministry logo
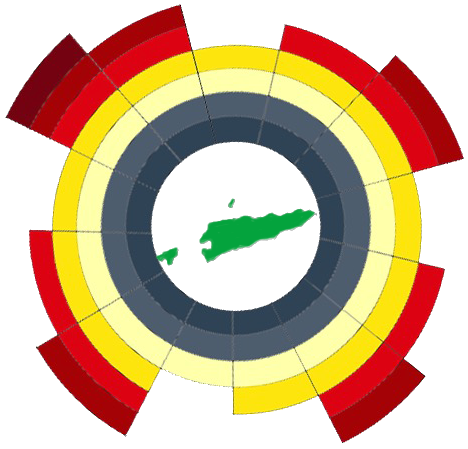

The Ministry of State Administration (MAE; Portuguese: Ministério da Administração Estatal, Tetum: Ministériu Administrasaun Estatál) is a government department of Timor-Leste with responsibility for local government and associated matters. It was formed in 2007.

== Functions ==
The Ministry is responsible for the design, implementation, coordination and evaluation of policy for the following areas:

- local government;
- administrative decentralization;
- support to community organizations;
- promotion of local development;
- organization and execution of electoral and referendum processes;
- promotion of hygiene and urban organization; and
- classification and conservation of official documents with historical value.

== Minister ==
The incumbent Minister of State Administration is Tomás do Rosário Cabral. He is assisted by Jacinto Rigoberto Gomes de Deus, Deputy Minister of State Administration. (Note: The Constitution of Timor-Leste provides, in sections 104 and 105, for the appointment of officials referred to in its English language version as "Deputy Ministers". In other English language publications, those officials are commonly referred to as "Vice Ministers", even though the word "Vice", in context, arguably has a different meaning in English from the word "Deputy". In this article, the constitutional expression "Deputy" is used.)

== See also ==
- Politics of Timor-Leste
