= Maria Gomes =

Maria Gomes can refer to:

- Maria Teresinha Gomes (1933–2007), Portuguese woman who nearly 20 years pretended to be a male army general
- Maria Carneiro Pereira Gomes, Brazilian First Lady
- Maria Eugénia Varela Gomes, campaigner against the authoritarian Estado Novo government in Portugal
- Ana Maria Gomes (born 1954), Portuguese politician, Member of the European Parliament since 2004
- Maria Amélia Gomes Barros da Lomba do Amaral, known as Amélia da Lomba (born 1961), Angolan writer and journalist
- Maria Carolina Gomes Santiago (born 1985), Brazilian Paralympic swimmer
- Rosa Maria Gomes de Lima (born 1964), Brazilian retired footballer
- Maria Gomes (badminton), 4-times champion in Portuguese National Badminton Championships 1990–93
- Jesuina Maria Ferreira Gomes (active since 1990s), Brazilian politician
- Abi-Maria Gomes, got 5th place in Survivor: Philippines in 2012
- Maria Gomes Da Silva, Angolan blind runner, see Angola at the 2012 Summer Paralympics

== See also ==
- Fernão Pires, Portuguese wine grape also known as Maria Gomes
