= Ministry of Petroleum and Minerals (Timor-Leste) =

Ministry in the government of Timor-Leste

- Ministério do Petróleo e Minerais (Portuguese); Ministériu Petróleu no Minerais (Tetum)
- Coat of Arms of Timor-Leste

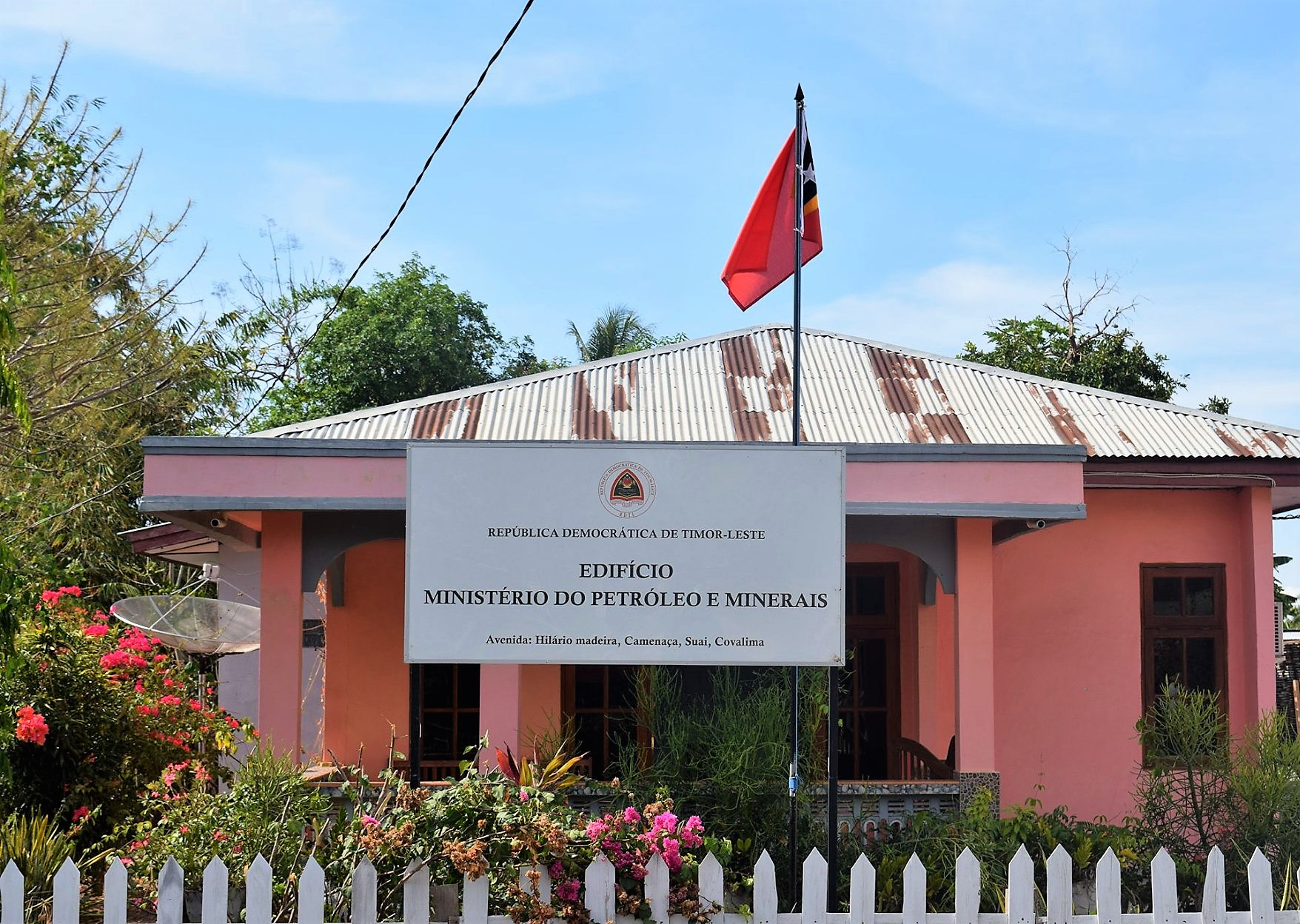
- Office of the Ministry, Suai

Ministry overview
- Formed: 2001
- Jurisdiction: Government of Timor-Leste
- Headquarters: Praça do Palácio do Gov., Comoro, Dili; 8°33′15″S 125°34′45″E
- Minister responsible: Francisco da Costa Monteiro, Minister of Petroleum and Minerals
- Website: Ministry of Petroleum and Minerals
- Agency ID: MPM
- Ministry logo
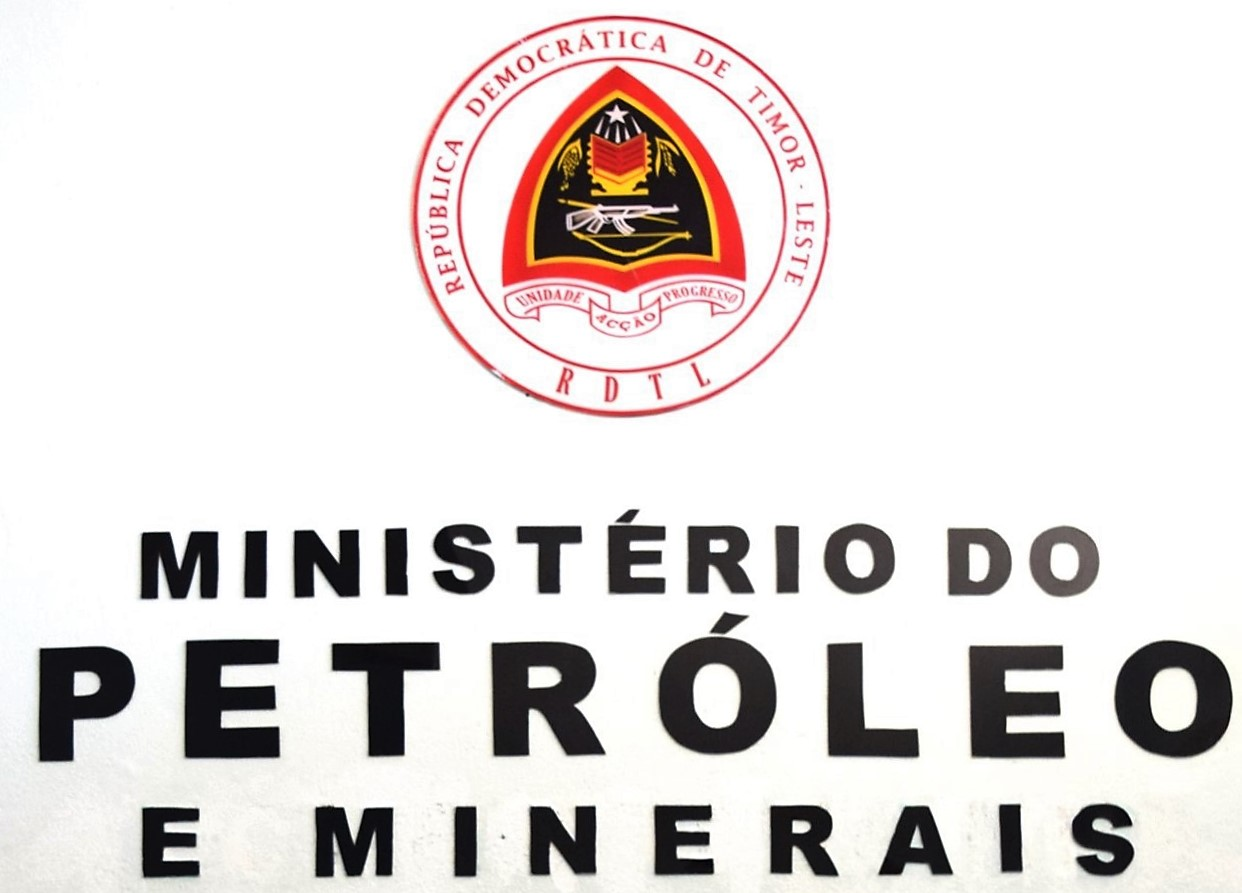

The Ministry of Petroleum and Minerals (MPM; Portuguese: Ministério do Petróleo e Minerais, Tetum: Ministériu Petróleu no Minerais) is the government department of Timor-Leste accountable for energy policy, management of mineral resources, and related matters.

== Functions ==
The Ministry is responsible for the design and implementation of policies for the following areas:

- energy;
- management of mineral resources, including oil and other strategic ores;

and for the licensing and regulation of extractive activity and industrial activity to benefit petroleum and minerals, including petrochemicals and refining.

== Minister ==
The incumbent Minister of Petroleum and Minerals is Francisco da Costa Monteiro.

== See also ==
- List of petroleum ministries
- Politics of Timor-Leste
