= Ministry of petroleum =

A ministry of petroleum or ministry of oil is a kind of government ministry often found in countries that are producers and exporters of petroleum.

Examples include:

- Ministry of Oil (Kuwait)
- Ministry of Oil (Iraq)
- Ministry of Oil Industry, Soviet Union
- Ministry of Oil and Gas (Kazakhstan)
- Ministry of Oil and Gas (Sudan)
- Ministry of Oil and Minerals (Yemen)
- Ministry of Oil and Mineral Resources (Syria)
- Ministry of Oil and Mineral Resources (Turkmenistan)
- Ministry of Petroleum and Mineral Resources (Egypt)
- Ministry of Petroleum (Iran)
- Ministry of Petroleum Resources Development, Sri Lanka
- Ministry of Petroleum and Energy, Norway
- Ministry of Petroleum and Mineral Resources, Saudi Arabia
- Ministry of Petroleum and Minerals, Timor-Leste
- Ministry of Petroleum and Mining, South Sudan
- Ministry of Petroleum and Natural Gas, India
- Federal Ministry of Petroleum Resources (Nigeria)

== See also ==
- Ministry of energy
