= Dionísio Babo Soares =

East Timorese politician

Dionísio da Costa Babo Soares
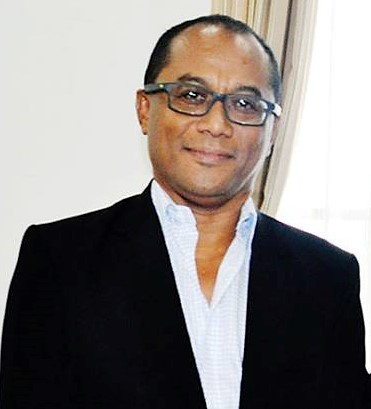
- Babo Soares in 2017

Minister for Foreign Affairs and Cooperation
- In office 22 June 2018 – 25 May 2020
- Prime Minister: Taur Matan Ruak
- Preceded by: Aurélio Sérgio Cristóvão Guterres
- Succeeded by: Adaljíza Magno

Member of the National Parliament
- In office 2017–2018

Minister of State, Coordinator of State Administration Affairs and Justice, and Minister of State Administration
- In office 16 February 2015 – 15 September 2017
- Prime Minister: Rui Maria de Araújo
- Preceded by: Jorge Teme
- Succeeded by: Valentim Ximenes

Minister of Justice
- In office 8 August 2012 – 16 February 2015
- Prime Minister: Xanana Gusmão
- Preceded by: Lúcia Lobato
- Succeeded by: Ivo Jorge Valente

Personal details
- Born: 16 August 1966 (age 60) Ermera, Portuguese Timor (now Timor-Leste)
- Party: National Congress for Timorese Reconstruction (CNRT)
- Education: Udayana University; Massey University; Australian National University

Dionísio da Costa Babo Soares (born 16 August 1966) is an East Timorese politician, and a member of the National Congress for Timorese Reconstruction (CNRT). From June 2018 to May 2020, he was the Minister for Foreign Affairs and Cooperation, under the VIII Constitutional Government of Timor-Leste; he had earlier served as Minister of State, Coordinator of State Administration Affairs and Justice, Minister of State Administration, and Minister of Justice.

== Early life and career ==
Babo Soares was born in Ermera in the northwest of East Timor (then a Portuguese colony) on 16 August 1966. He graduated in constitutional law from Udayana University in Denpasar, Bali, Indonesia, in 1990. As a student, he actively participated in the resistance movement against the occupation of his home country and was a member of various groups, such as the Liga dos Estudantes Patriotas (LEP). In 1989, he was involved in a petition to make the United Nations aware of the fate of East Timor. He also took part in demonstrations at the Indonesian embassy in Wellington, New Zealand.

In 1995, Babo Soares completed a master's degree in philosophy with a focus on development studies at Massey University in Palmerston North, New Zealand. Between 1995 and 1999, he was a member of the academic staff of the then Universitas Timor Timur (UNTIM), now succeeded by the National University of Timor-Leste. From 1998, he was a doctoral student in anthropology at the Research School of Pacific and Asian Studies of the Australian National University in Canberra. His research focused on political and social developments in Timor-Leste during its preparation for independence between 1999 and 2002.

In 2003, Babo Soares worked at the Asia Foundation in Timor-Leste. The same year, he was a co-founder of the East Timor Coffee Institute. In addition, he taught from 2003 to 2012 at the Universidade da Paz, and in 2003 and 2004 at the Universidade Dili (UNDIL).

== Political career ==
From 2005 to 2008, Babo Soares, together with Benjamin Mangkoedilaga of Indonesia, co-chaired the Indonesia–Timor Leste Commission of Truth and Friendship (CTF), which was tasked with working on behalf of the Presidents of both countries in dealing with human rights violations during the 1999 East Timorese crisis. Pro-Indonesia militia and Indonesian security personnel had inflicted a wave of violence upon the occupied East Timor after the population had voted for independence in a referendum. Around 250,000 East Timorese had fled or been deported to West Timor, and around 2,000 to 3,000 people had died. The CTF's final report found that Indonesia's government, military and police were “to blame for the serious violations of human rights” in the 1999 crisis. Indonesia's President Susilo Bambang Yudhoyono then expressed his "very deep remorse at what happened in the past".

On 12 May 2005, Babo Soares was sworn in as a member of the Superior Council for Defence and Security of Timor-Leste. In April 2006, he was appointed as a member of the Board of Directors of Timor-Leste's Public Broadcasting Service.

In 2007, Babo Soares became Secretary-General of the CNRT, which was then in the process of being founded by Xanana Gusmão. From the parliamentary elections of 2007 until 2017, the CNRT was part of the government, initially with Gusmão as Prime Minister, and from 2015 under Rui Maria de Araújo of Fretilin.

Between 2007 and 2012, Babo Soares worked as a consultant to the Deputy Prime Minister for Social Affairs, José Luís Guterres. In the parliamentary elections of 2012, in which the CNRT achieved the highest number of votes, Babo Soares was elected to the National Parliament as the #2 candidate on the CNRT list. However, on 8 August 2012 he was sworn in as the new Justice Minister of Timor-Leste, and therefore did not take up his parliamentary seat. During the government reshuffle in February 2015, Babo Soares became Minister of State, Coordinator of State Administration Affairs and Justice, and Minister of State Administration.

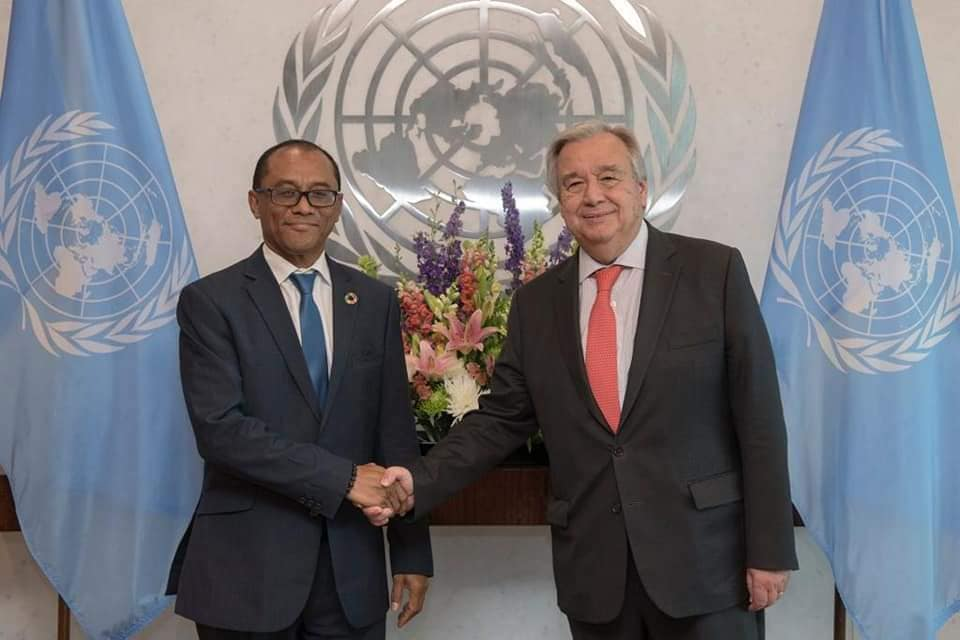
Babo Soares and UN Secretary-General António Guterres in 2019

In 2017, Babo Soares lost his post as Secretary General of the CNRT to Francisco Kalbuadi Lay at the party congress. He became president of the party's national executive council. In the parliamentary elections of 2017, Soares was again elected to the National Parliament as the CNRT's #2 list candidate. However, as the CNRT went into opposition after that election, Babo Soares lost his executive office in the government.

In September 2017, Babo Soares was appointed as a delegate to the National Parliamentary Group at the Parliamentary Assembly of the Community of Portuguese Language Countries (CPLP) In that month, he also became a member of the Parliamentary Committee for Constitutional Affairs, Justice, Public Administration, Local Jurisprudence and Anti-Corruption (Committee-A).

In 2018, the National Parliament of Timor-Leste was dissolved early. In the elections that followed the dissolution, Babo Soares was again elected to the National Parliament, this time in 10th place on the list of the Alliance for Change and Progress (AMP), of which the CNRT was part. On 22 June 2018, Babo Soares was sworn in as Minister for Foreign Affairs and Cooperation, and therefore again automatically relinquished his parliamentary seat.

At the annual meeting of the United Nations General Assembly in 2018, Babo Soares was scheduled to give a speech, but fell ill. He was replaced at short notice by Timor-Leste's Permanent Representative at the United Nations in New York, Milena Pires. Soon afterwards, Babo Soares underwent heart surgery in New York.

Following the breakdown of the AMP coalition in the first few months of 2020, the CNRT decided on 30 April 2020 that its members serving in the VIII Constitutional Government would resign their positions. The CNRT informed the government of its decision on 8 May 2020, and Babo Soares resigned as Minister for Foreign Affairs and Cooperation on 25 May 2020. After CNRT returned to office in 2023, he became Permanent Representative of Timor-Leste to the United Nations and was elected in 2025 as one of the vice-presidents of the General Assembly.

== Publications ==
- Branching from the Trunk: East Timorese Perceptions of Nationalism in Transition (Canberra: PhD thesis, Australian National University, 2003; OCLC 793206496)
- Elections and Constitution Making in East Timor (Canberra: State, Society and Governance in Melanesia Project, Australian National University, 2003; ISBN 0731533496)
- Out of the Ashes: Destruction and Reconstruction of East Timor (PDF). (ed) (with James J. Fox (ed)) (Canberra: ANU Press, 2003; ISBN 9780975122914)
- Tetum, Language Manual for East Timor (5th ed.) (with Geoffrey Hull and Jorge da Conceição Teme) (Winston Hills, NSW, Australia: Sebastião Aparício da Silva Project, 2005; ISBN 186341875X)
