= Alfredo Pires =

East Timorese politician

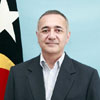

Minister of State of Natural Resources
- In office 7 April 2007 – 20 May 2012
- President: Jose Ramos Horta
- Preceded by: Unknown
- Succeeded by: TBD Next Election

Personal details
- Born: 1964 (age 61–62) Portuguese Timor
- Party: CNRT
- Education: Ballarat University; Macau University
- Profession: Community organiser Environmentalism

Alfredo Pires (born 1964 in Lolotoe) is an East Timorese politician. In 2002, Alfredo Pires was chosen by the Prime Minister of East Timor, Xanana Gusmão to serve as the Secretary of State for Natural Resources in Timor-Leste and is responsible for petroleum and mineral resources. Minister for Natural Resources was Gusmão, too. 2012 Pires took the minister rang over.

As Secretary of State, Mr. Pires’ priority is to develop Timorese human resources and engage the Timorese people in the petroleum industry. With a team of young Timorese geologists and engineers, he is spearheading the petroleum sector reform with the creation of the National Petroleum Authority (NPA), the National Oil Company and an Institute of Petroleum and Geology.

In terms of good governance Mr. Pires is augmenting previous efforts by introducing the Timor-Leste Transparency Model (TLTM) to ensure that the people of East Timor are well informed about the petroleum sector.

Mr. Pires supports an “After Oil” policy, encouraging his government and the public to see oil as only an engine of growth for the economic development, the nation not to depend on oil, and the government to invest in the non-oil sector.
