= Tomás Cabral =

East Timorese politician

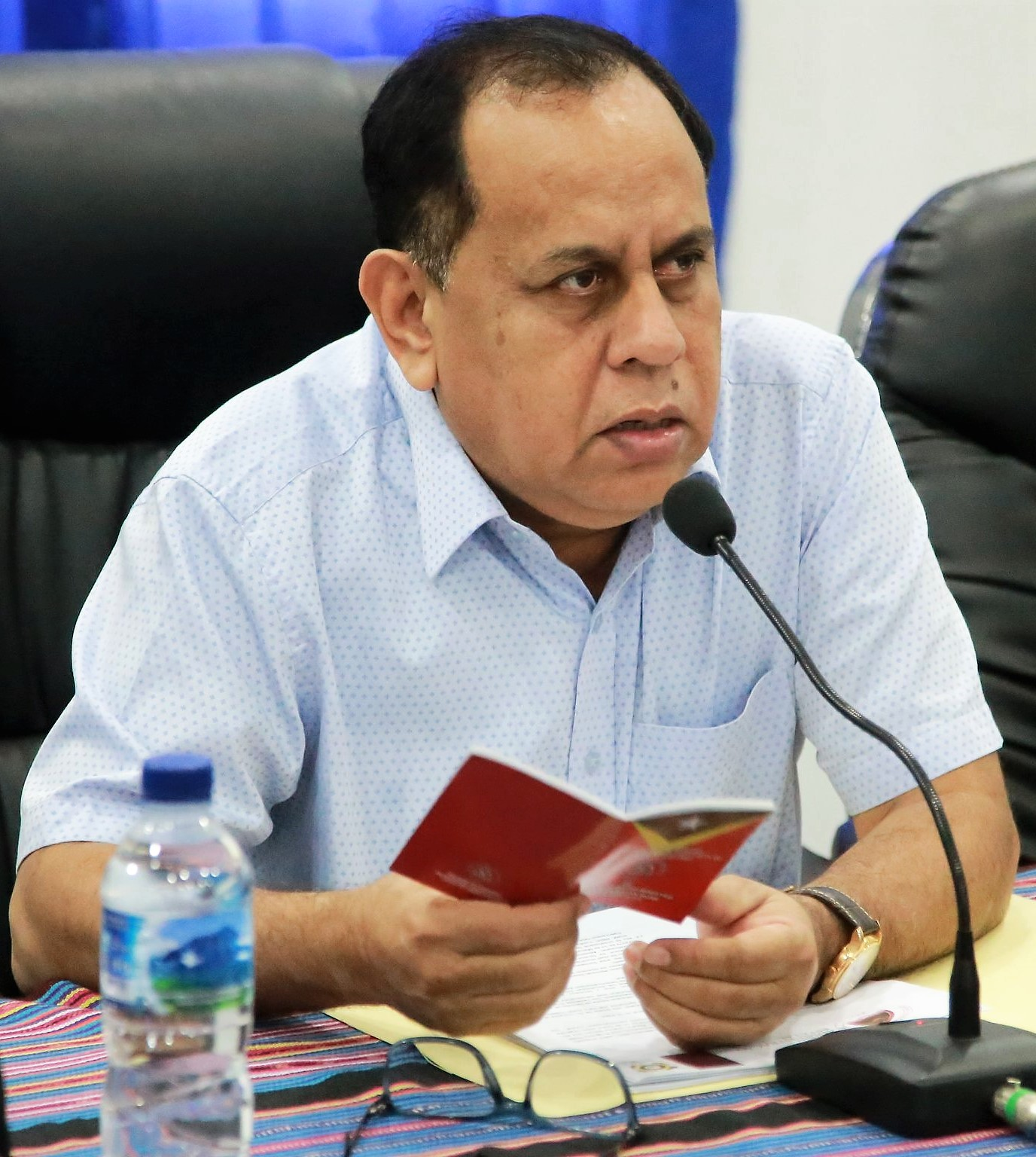
- Cabral in 2019

Minister of State Administration
- Incumbent
- Assumed office 1 July 2023
- Prime Minister: Xanana Gusmão
- Preceded by: Miguel Pereira de Carvalho

Vice Minister of State Administration
- In office 16 February 2015 – 5 September 2017
- Prime Minister: Rui Maria de Araújo
- Preceded by: Office established
- Succeeded by: José Anuno

Personal details
- Born: Tomás do Rosário Cabral
- Party: National Congress for Timorese Reconstruction (CNRT)

Tomás do Rosário Cabral is an East Timorese politician, and a member of the National Congress for Timorese Reconstruction (Portuguese: Congresso Nacional de Reconstrução de Timor, CNRT).

He is the incumbent Minister of State Administration, serving since July 2023 in the IX Constitutional Government of East Timor led by Prime Minister Xanana Gusmão.
