= Francisco da Costa Monteiro =

East Timorese politician

Minister of Petroleum and Minerals
- Incumbent
- Assumed office 1 July 2023
- Prime Minister: Xanana Gusmão
- Preceded by: Víctor da Conceição Soares

Personal details
- Party: National Congress for Timorese Reconstruction (CNRT)

Francisco da Costa Monteiro, is an East Timorese oil expert and politician, and a member of the National Congress for Timorese Reconstruction (Portuguese: Congresso Nacional de Reconstrução de Timor, CNRT).

He is the incumbent Minister of Petroleum and Minerals, serving since July 2023 in the IX Constitutional Government of Timor-Leste led by Prime Minister Xanana Gusmão.

== Works ==
- Monteiro, Francisco da Costa; Pinto, Vicenti da Costa (17–18 November 2003). Exploring Timor-Leste: - Minerals Potential. Pacific Economic Cooperation Council-PECC Minerals Network. Brisbane, Queensland.
- "Opinion articles by Francisco da Costa Monteiro". La'o Hamutuk: Timor-Leste Institute for Development Monitoring and Analysis.
