= Aicha Bassarewan =

East Timorese politician

Aicha Binte Umar Bassarewan (Arabic: عائشة بنت عمر باشروان) is an East Timorese politician who was Vice-Minister of Planning and Finance in the National Parliament of East Timor from 2002 to 2007. She is a member of the FRETILIN party.

== Career ==
Bassareawan attended Liceu Dr. Francisco Machado, and completed a master's degree at the National University of East Timor (UNTL). During the Indonesian occupation, she was a founding member of the Popular Organisation of East Timorese Women (OPMT), and one of the volunteer teachers who taught literacy to adults and children, as well as revolutionary ideas.

From 20 May 2002 to 8 August 2007, Bassarewan was Vice Minister of Planning and Finance. From 2009 to 2012, she was a deputy for Ana Pessoa Pinto MP, and a member of Standing Committee C, the Commission for Economic Affairs, Finance and Anti-Corruption.

As of 2019, Bassarewan is non-executive member of the Board of Governors of the Central Bank of East Timor.

== Publications ==
- 2010 'The teaching and the learning of reading in the first years of schooling in East Timor', co-author Simone Michelle Silvestre. In Educação e Pesquisa, Vol. 36 No. 2. doi:10.1590/S1517-97022010000200005
