= Office of the Provedor for Human Rights and Justice =

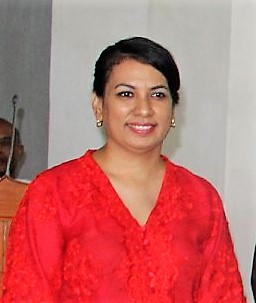
Benicia Eriana Ximenes dos Reis Magno, Vice Ombudsman for Human Rights and Justice, in 2019

The Office of the Provedor for Human Rights and Justice, or Provedoria dos Direitos Humanos e Justiça (PDHJ), is the National Human Rights Institution of the Democratic Republic of Timor-Leste. It was established under Section 27 of the Constitution of Timor-Leste in May 2002 and first opened its doors in 2006. The PDHJ has a dual mandate covering human rights and good governance.

The main activities of the PDHJ include cooperation with national and international entities for the advancement of a human rights framework in Timor-Leste, good governance and human rights monitoring, activities for the promotion of human rights and good governance principles, reporting to the United Nations treaty bodies and the Human Rights Council, activities for human rights education as well as conducting investigations in relation to human rights issues or abuses. The current Provedor (Ombudsman) is Jesuina Maria Ferreira Gomes.

== Location ==
The main office of the PDHJ is located in Timor-Leste's capital Dili. There are 4 regional offices: in Baucau, Oecusse, Same and Maliana.

== Mission and vision ==
The PDHJ's vision is to protect human rights, strengthen integrity and promote good governance in Timor-Leste.

The PDHJ's mission is:

- To create a public conscience through the promotion of a culture that respects the principles of human rights, rule of law and good governance.
- To provide motivation and assistance to entities and public agencies to develop policies, procedures, internal training and complaint mechanisms that promote human rights and good governance.
- To effectively address the issue of human right violations and mal-administration using mechanisms which deal with complaints effectively and through a process that promotes mediation and conciliation.
- To provide recommendations on the means and ways to protect human rights and good governance, based on the results of investigation, inquiry and monitoring (directly or in partnership with its partners in civil society) that will guarantee the constitutionality of legislative decisions, the protection of human rights, the strengthening of integrity and the promotion of good governance in Timor-Leste.

== Accreditation ==
The PDHJ was first accredited as an A-status National Human Rights Institution by the International Coordinating Committee of National Human Rights Institutions in 2008. The PDHJ retained its status through a re-accreditation process in 2013. As such, the PDHJ complies with the 1993 Paris Principles and therefore has access to the UN Human Rights Council and other UN bodies.

In that competency, the PDHJ has reported to the UN treaty bodies, for example to the UN Committee on the Rights of the Child and to the UN CEDAW Committee.

== Legal basis ==
The 2002 Constitution of Timor-Leste established the Provedor for Human Rights and Justice as an independent organ. The Statutes of the PDHJ were approved through Law 7/2004, amended by Law 8/2009 and the Organic Structure of the PDHJ was approved through Decree Law 25/2011.

== Structure ==
The Office of the Provedor for Human Rights and Justice is headed by the Provedor, currently Jesuina Maria Ferreira Gomes, and two deputy Provedors, currently Benícia Eriana Magno and José Cristovão Telo. General guidance on all services pertaining to the Secretary for Human Rights and Justice is provided by the Director General, currently Ambrosio Graciano Soares.

The PDHJ has a number of directorates, including a directorate of Human Rights and a Directorate of Good Governance.

== Main competencies ==
The PDHJ has a number of competencies. Among others, the PDHJ has the authority to:

Receive complaints

All legal and natural persons can lodge a complaint with the Office of the Ombudsman for Human Rights and Justice. Complaints can be made individually or collectively, including through class actions.

Carry out investigations into possible violations of human rights and good governance

The Ombudsman for Human Rights and Justice is empowered to investigate violations of fundamental human rights, freedoms and guarantees, abuse of power, maladministration, illegality, manifest injustice and lack of due process, as well as instances of nepotism, collusion, influence peddling and corruption.

Monitor and advice public authorities

The Ombudsman for Human Rights and Justice is empowered to:

- Oversee the functioning of public authorities, notably the Government, its agencies and private entities fulfilling public functions and services and can conduct inquiries into systematic or widespread violations of human rights, maladministration or corruption;
- Submit to the Government, the National Parliament or any other competent body, on an advisory basis, opinions, recommendations, proposals and reports on any matter concerning the promotion and protection of human rights and good governance;
- Request the Supreme Court to declare the unconstitutionality of legislative measures, including unconstitutionality through omission in accordance with Sections 150 and 151 of the Constitution of Timor-Leste;
- Monitor and review regulations, administrative instructions, policies and practices in force or any draft legislation for consistency with customary international law and ratified human rights treaties;
- Recommend the adoption of new legislation, and propose the amendment of legislation in force and the adoption or amendment of administrative measures.

Promote Human Rights and Good Governance

The Ombudsman for Human Rights and Justice is, within the scope of his or her action to promote human rights and good governance, empowered to:

- Promote a culture of respect for human rights, good governance and fight against corruption, notably by making public statements, conducting information campaigns or by other appropriate means to inform the general public and public administration, and disseminate information regarding human rights, good governance and fight against corruption;
- Make recommendations on the ratification of, or accession to, international human rights instruments, monitor the implementation of those instruments, and recommend that reservations to those instruments be either withdrawn or raised.

Fight against corruption

The Ombudsman for Human Rights and Justice was empowered to investigate instances of corruption, however it lost this responsibility as a consequence of Law 8/2009, which amended the statutes (Law 7/2004) of the Ombudsman´s office and established the Timor-Leste Anti-Corruption Commission.
