= Valentim Ximenes =

East Timorese politician and academic

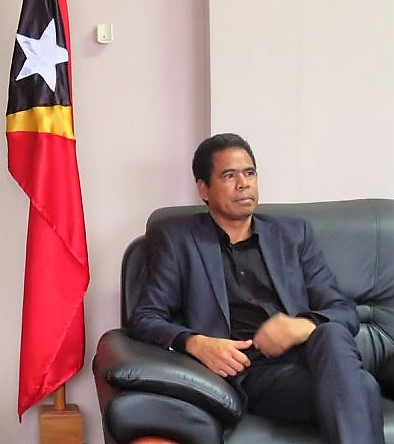

Minister of State Administration
- In office 15 September 2017 – 22 June 2018
- Prime Minister: Mari Alkatiri
- Preceded by: Dionísio Babo Soares
- Succeeded by: Miguel Pereira de Carvalho; (from 29 May 2020)

Vice Minister of State Administration
- In office 26 July 2005 – 8 August 2007
- Prime Minister: Mari Alkatiri
- Preceded by: Alcino Araújo Baris
- Succeeded by: Filomeno Aleixo

Personal details
- Born: 30 September 1966 (age 59) Venilale, Portuguese Timor (now East Timor)

Valentim Ximenes (born 30 September 1966) is an East Timorese politician and academic. He is a member of the Fretilin political party. Between 2017 and 2018, he was the Minister for State Administration under the VII Constitutional Government of East Timor led by Mari Alkatiri. Previously, between 2005 and 2007, he was the Vice Minister for State Administration under the V Constitutional Government also led by Mari Alkatiri.

== Early life and career ==
Ximenes graduated in 1994 from the National University of East Timor (UNTL, then the Universitas Timor Timur UNTIM), with a degree in governmental sciences. In 2000, he obtained a master's in political science from the graduate school of art and sciences, Ateneo de Manila University, Philippines.

In May 2002, he succeeded Vicente Soares Faria as dean of the faculty of social sciences and politics at the UNTL.

== Political career ==
From 26 July 2005 to 8 August 2007, Ximenes was Vice Minister for State Administration under the V Constitutional Government.

Subsequently, he resumed his academic career as a lecturer at the Faculty of Social Sciences and Politics at the UNTL, and also entered a PhD program at the University of Coimbra. His research focused on governance and public administration.

On 15 September 2017, Ximenes was sworn in as Minister of State Administration in the VII Constitutional Government. He left that office on 22 June 2018, upon the formation of the VIII Constitutional Government.

== Publications ==
- "Policy Formulation on Local Government Reform in Timor-Leste", in: Steven Farram (ed.) Locating Democracy. Representation, Elections and Governance in Timor-Leste (Darwin: Charles Darwin University Press, 2010; ISBN 9780980665093), 9–19.
