= Council of State (Timor-Leste) =

- Conselho de Estado
- Coat of arms of Timor-Leste

Council overview
- Formed: 20 May 2002
- Jurisdiction: Timor-Leste
- Headquarters: Dili
- Council executive: President of the Republic
- Key document: Constitution of Timor-Leste
- Website: Text of the Constitution

The Council of State (Portuguese: Conselho de Estado, Tetum: Conselho de Estado) is a body established by the East Timorese Constitution to advise the President of the Republic in the exercise of many of his or her discretionary powers.

== History ==
The East Timorese Council of State is modelled on its Portuguese counterpart, which traces its history back to 1385. Portugal was the European colonizing power in East Timor between 1702 and 1975.

The then Portuguese Council of State was declared extinct in October 1910 when the Portuguese monarchy was overthrown. In 1931, however, during the Ditadura Nacional (National Dictatorship), a National Political Council was created. Two years later, upon the adoption of Portugal's Constitution of 1933 creating the Estado Novo (New State), the National Political Council became the Council of State. The Constitution of 1933 remained in force until 1976.

The present Portuguese Council of State is a product of the 1982 review of Portugal's Constitution of 1976. The East Timorese Constitution providing for a similar East Timorese body came into force in 2002.

== Composition ==
According to section 90 of the Constitution, the Council of State is headed by the President of the Republic and comprises the following members:

1. Former Presidents of the Republic who were not removed from office;
2. The Speaker of the National Parliament;
3. The Prime Minister;
4. Five citizens elected by the National Parliament in accordance with the principle of proportional representation and for the period corresponding to the legislative term, provided that they are not members of the organs of sovereignty.
5. Five citizens designated by the President of the Republic for the period corresponding to the term of office of the President, provided that they are not members of the organs of sovereignty.

== Role ==
Section 91 of the Constitution states that the function of the Council of State is to:

1. Express its opinion on the dissolution of the National Parliament;
2. Express its opinion on the dismissal of the Government;
3. Express its opinion on the declaration of war and the making of peace;
4. Express its opinion on any other cases set out in the Constitution and advise the President of the Republic in the exercise of his or her functions, as requested by the President;
5. To draft its Rules of Procedures.

== See also ==
- Constitutional Government of Timor-Leste
