= Jesuina Maria Ferreira Gomes =

Jesuina Maria Ferreira Gomes is Provedor for Human Rights and Justice in the Office of the Provedor for Human Rights and Justice, or Provedoria dos Direitos Humanos e Justiça (PDHJ), in Timor-Leste. She has held this position since October 2018. Prior to that, she served one term as Deputy Provedor.

== Education ==
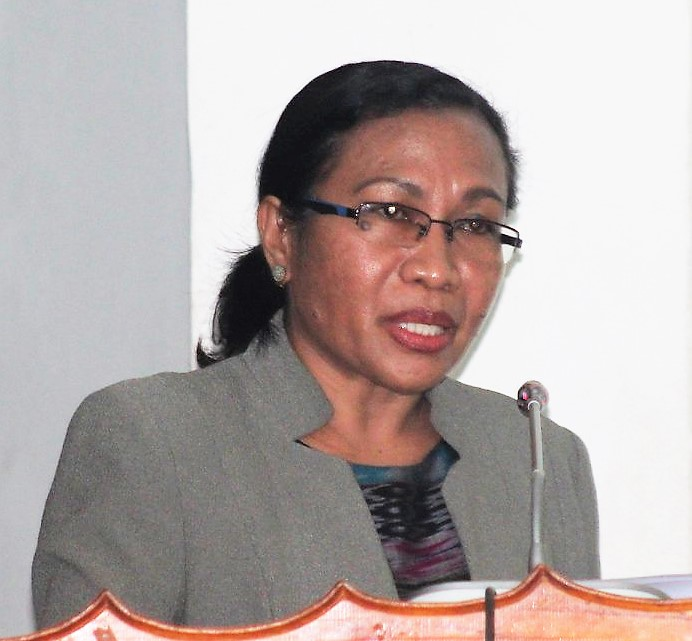
Jesuína Maria Ferreira Gomes 2019-02-28

Jesuina Maria Ferreira Gomes holds a master's degree in Public Administration from the University of Hawaiʻi (USA).

== Professional life ==
Jesuina Maria Ferreira Gomes has worked as an administrative assistant at provincial level in the 1990s and has also taught public management at the National University of Timor-Leste. In 2009 she was appointed as the Inspector-General to the Ministry of State Administration and Territorial Planning. In the same year, the National Parliament appointed her as the Commissioner of the Civil Service Commission. In 2012, while still Commissioner she also assumed responsibility for training and development in the National Institute for Public Administration.
