= Venilale =

Town in Baucau, East Timor

Coordinates: 8°35′S 126°22′E

Venilale (formerly Vila Viçosa) is a town located about 30 km south of Baucau in Timor-Leste. It is the capital of the Venilale Administrative Post.

The name Venilale comes from the Kairui-Midiki brini lale 'cold inside'. During the colonial period, Portuguese would escape the heat of Baucau by going up to the mountains of Venilale. This is reflected in the town's examples of colonial architecture

== Tourism ==
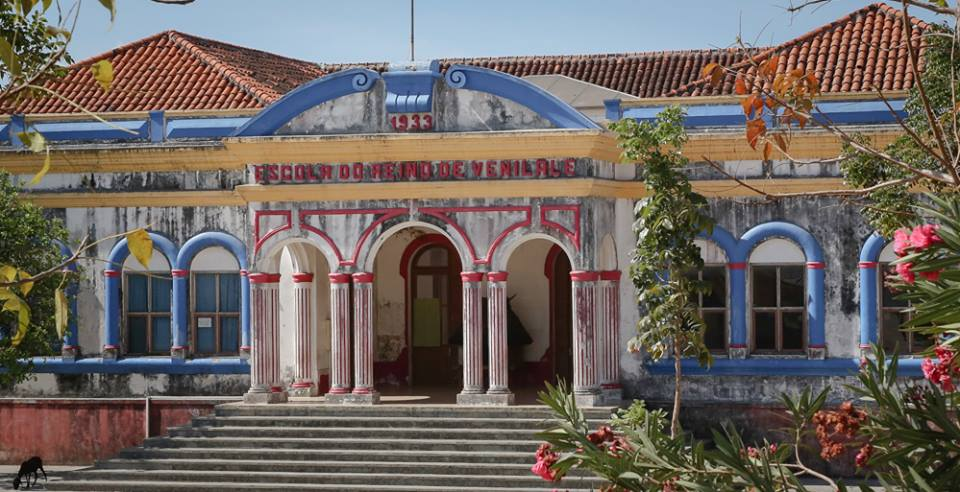
Escola do Reino de Venilale (2015)

Venilale has been a popular destination, even in the Portuguese colonial era, known for its cooler temperatures, natural attractions such as hot springs and a natural bridge and the striking Escola do Reino de Venilale. More recently it has become famous for its caves, built by the Japanese during World War Two and for being used as a hiding place for FRETLIN freedom fighters during the Indonesian occupation.

A tourism information centre has been set up in the old police station which is a striking raised structure in the centre of town.

== Economy ==
The economy of the area is mostly rural, based on rice grown in terraced fields worked by water buffalo, or in some cases by rotary hoes or tractors. Other crops are bananas, peanuts, coffee, copra, corn and vegetables, and there are pigs, goats, chickens and a few cows and horses. Most people are subsistence farmers and they face many obstacles: low crop yields, lack of access to clean water, poor infrastructure and inadequate market access as well as low literacy and education levels.

A market is held in Venilale twice a week (Wednesday and Saturday), and there is also a Friday market in the Bercoli village. These markets form a focus for the economic and social life of the administrative post and many people walk for hours to bring their produce for sale. Apart from these markets there are a few family owned kiosks stocking a variety of goods.

== Local East Timor Government ==
Venilale Administrative Post is within the Baucau Municipality. The Venilale administrative post comprises eight sucos, or groups of villages. Each suco is headed by a xefe (pronounced CHEFF-ee), which became an elected position for the first time in mid-2009.

== Health ==
The administrative post has five public health clinics, staffed by nurses, which provide immunisation, family planning, pre- and post-natal care and minor surgery. A Catholic orphanage in Venilale includes a new maternal health clinic, in addition to a public maternity ward at the clinic. An ambulance is stationed at Venilale; the closest major hospital is in Baucau.

== School and Church ==
Schools in Timor-Leste are operated by the government and the Catholic Church. Venilale administrative post has fourteen primary schools (four public and ten Catholic). Secondary education in Timor-Leste is divided into junior high schools (classes 1–3, equivalent to Years 7–9) and senior high schools (classes 1–3, equivalent to Years 10–12). Venilale has four junior high schools (three public, one Catholic), as well as one public senior high school and a Catholic senior technical school. Tertiary courses are available in Baucau and there is a university in Dili.
