= Ana Pessoa Pinto =

East Timorese politician

The Honorable Ana Pessoa Pinto
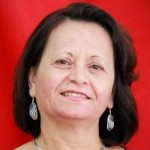

3rd Minister of Justice
- In office 20 September 2001 – 19 March 2003
- Preceded by: Gita Honwana-Welch
- Succeeded by: Domingos Maria Sarmento

Personal details
- Born: Ana Maria Pessoa Pereira da Silva Pinto; 5 January 1956 (age 70) Bobonaro, Portuguese Timor
- Party: Fretilin
- Spouse: José Ramos-Horta (divorced)
- Children: Loro Horta
- Occupation: Politician of East Timor

Ana Maria Pessoa Pereira da Silva Pinto (born January 5, 1956) is an East Timorese politician who served in several roles, including as the country's prosecutor general. She is a member of FRETILIN.

== Career ==
Ana Pessoa was active in the Timor-Leste independence campaign while studying law at Eduardo Mondlane University in Mozambique in the 1980s. She went on to work as Director of National Investigations and Legislation of Mozambique from 1990 to 2000.

During the United Nations Transitional Administration in East Timor (UNTAET) from 1999 to 2002, Pessoa was the Cabinet Member for the Interior). She joined the Second Transitional Government as Minister of Justice until 2003, then served as minister of state administration until 2007. Following the parliamentary elections on 30 June 2007, she returned to the National Parliament as a Fretilin deputy.

On 27 March 2009, Pessoa became the new attorney general, replacing Longuinhos Monteiro. She subsequently retired from politics and lives in Dili.

== Personal life ==
More commonly known as Ana Pessoa, she was elected to the National Parliament in the 2007 legislative elections.

Her family originates from the western town of Maliana.

She is the former wife of José Ramos-Horta, the current president. They have a son, Loro Horta, born in 1977, who is a Timor-Leste diplomat. She has three other children from a second marriage.

On 19 May 2012, Pessoa was awarded the Collar of the Order of Timor-Leste.
