= Estanislau da Silva =

4th Prime Minister of East Timor

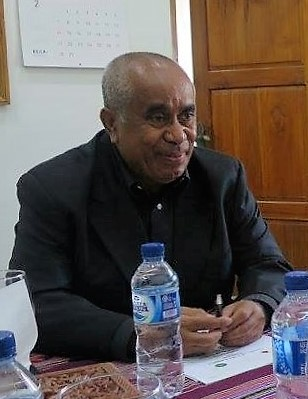

5th Prime Minister of East Timor
- In office 19 May 2007 – 8 August 2007
- President: José Ramos-Horta
- Preceded by: José Ramos-Horta
- Succeeded by: Xanana Gusmão

Personal details
- Born: 4 August 1952 (age 74) Dili, Portuguese Timor (now East Timor)
- Party: Fretilin

Estanislau da Conceição Aleixo Maria da Silva (born 4 August 1952) is an East Timorese politician and a key member of Fretilin. He was acting Prime Minister from May 2007 to August 2007.

A member of Fretilin since 1974, Da Silva served on the diplomatic front for the East Timorese resistance during the years of the Indonesian occupation of Timor-Leste (1975 to 1999). During the occupation, Da Silva resided in Mozambique (1976 to 1984), Portugal (1975 to 1976 and 1984 to 1985) and Australia (1985 to 1999), before returning to Timor-Leste in 1999.

After Timor-Leste achieved independence in 2002, Da Silva was appointed as the country's first Minister for Agriculture, Forestry and Fisheries. On 10 July 2006, he was sworn in as the First Deputy Prime Minister of Timor-Leste. He was sworn in as the acting Prime Minister on 19 May 2007 to replace José Ramos-Horta who had been elected President of the young nation. He left office when Xanana Gusmão was sworn in as Prime Minister on 8 August 2007, following the June 2007 parliamentary election.

== Early life ==
Da Silva was born in Dili in 1952 to Luis da Silva and Genoveva Aleixo. He attended primary school from 1961–1962 to 1964–1965 in Fuiloro – Lautém district, and Escola Industrial e Comercial Prof. Silva Cunha from 1965–1966 to 1970–1971. Upon graduation, Da Silva went to Lisbon to pursue further training in electrical and mechanical engineering.

== Political activities ==
Da Silva joined Fretilin in 1974 and was a founding member of the Fretilin External Branch in Lisbon.

In 1976, Da Silva interrupted his studies in Lisbon and was sent to Australia by the Fretilin leadership to lobby support for Timor-Leste's independence struggle. During that time, Australian supporters of Timor-Leste's independence struggle (Campaign for Independence of East Timor – CIET) requested that Da Silva assist Neville Cunningham and António Belo to operate and maintain a radio connection to the Fretilin leadership based in Timor-Leste. As Da Silva was not an Australian resident, he had to operate the radio secretly and spent six months in bush of Australia's Northern Territory.

In September 1976, Da Silva and Cunningham were tracked down and arrested by the Northern Territory Police Force and the radio link severed. Da Silva was released after a one-day trial and left Australia for Mozambique. The radio link was later re-established by Fretilin members and Australian supporters of Timor-Leste's struggle for independence.

Upon his return to Australia in 1985, Da Silva campaigned tirelessly for Timor-Leste's independence. This included speaking at public forums, organising demonstrations against the illegal Indonesian occupation, organising fundraising activities and lobbying MPs. Da Silva also maintained regular contact with the clandestine movement and the Fretilin leadership in Timor-Leste and assisted in helping people at risk of persecution escape Timor-Leste and settle in Australia. In 1994 he became the Fretilin representative in Australia.

Da Silva was voted into the Fretilin Central Committee in 1998 at the Fretilin National Conference held in Sydney, Australia. His mandate was renewed at the First National Congress in 2001 as well as the Second National Congress which was held in May 2006. He was elected chairperson in both events. He is also one of the 15 members of the National Political Commission of Fretilin which leads the work of the party between the Fretilin Central Committee meetings.

He was re-elected to a seat in parliament in the June 2007 parliamentary election as the ninth name on Fretilin's candidate list.

== Education and professional career ==
Da Silva studied agronomy at Eduardo Mondlane University, and worked at Marracuene state enterprise as the Chief Agronomist for the Mozambican government. He also attended the International Crops Research Institute for the Semi-Arid Tropics in India for short training courses in agriculture systems for arid and semi arid regions.

Whilst in Australia, Da Silva continued his studies in agronomy at the University of Sydney, where he completed a post-graduate diploma in Agronomy in 1987. In 1988 Da Silva was employed by the New South Wales Agricultural Department at the Trangie Research Agricultural Centre and from 1994 to 1997 worked at the Australian Cotton Research Institute in Narrabri.

In 1999, Da Silva returned to Timor-Leste. He worked as a World Bank consultant for agriculture and later as Asian Development Bank project manager for infrastructure before becoming Minister for Agriculture during the second United Nations transitional government. In May 2002, upon the restoration of independence of Timor Leste, Da Silva became the Minister for Agriculture, Forestry and Fisheries.

In 2002, Da Silva completed a two-year post-graduate training course in management and leadership provided by the Asian Development Bank Institute in Tokyo, Japan.

Da Silva is fluent in English, Portuguese and Tetum.

Political offices
| Preceded by José Ramos-Horta | Prime Minister of East Timor; 2007 | Succeeded by Xanana Gusmão |
