= José Ramos-Horta =

President of East Timor (2007–2012; since 2022)

His Excellency José Ramos-Horta
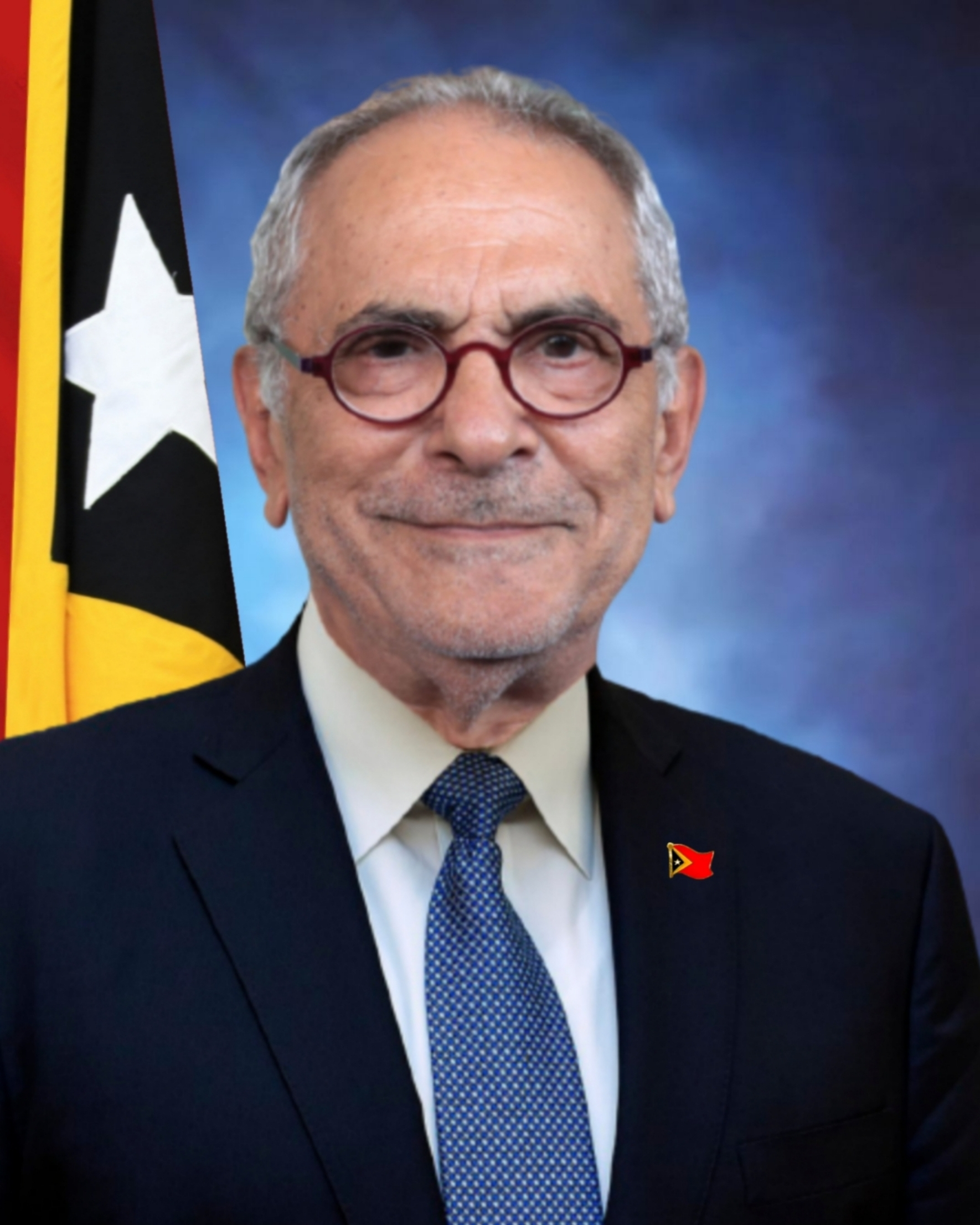
- Official portrait, 2023

4th & 7th President of Timor-Leste
- Incumbent
- Assumed office 20 May 2022
- Prime Minister: Taur Matan Ruak; Xanana Gusmão
- Preceded by: Francisco Guterres
- In office 20 May 2007 – 20 May 2012 (Note: Vicente Guterres and Fernando de Araújo served as acting presidents from 11 February to 17 April 2008 while Ramos-Horta was incapacitated following an assassination attempt.)
- Prime Minister: Estanislau da Silva; Xanana Gusmão
- Preceded by: Xanana Gusmão
- Succeeded by: Taur Matan Ruak

3rd Prime Minister of Timor-Leste
- In office 26 June 2006 – 19 May 2007 (Note: Acting until 8 July 2006)
- President: Xanana Gusmão
- Preceded by: Mari Alkatiri
- Succeeded by: Estanislau da Silva

Minister of Foreign Affairs
- In office 27 September 2002 – 25 June 2006
- Prime Minister: Mari Alkatiri
- Succeeded by: José Luís Guterres

Personal details
- Born: José Manuel Ramos-Horta; 26 December 1949 (age 76) Dili, Portuguese Timor (now Timor-Leste)
- Party: CNRT (2022–present)
- Other political affiliations: Fretilin (until 1988); Independent (1988–2022)
- Spouse: Ana Pessoa (divorced)
- Children: 1
- Education: Antioch University (MA); Columbia University

José Manuel Ramos-Horta (Portuguese pronunciation: [ʒuˈzɛ mɐˈnwɛl ˈʁɐ̃muz ˈɔɾtɐ]; born 26 December 1949) is an East Timorese politician who has been the seventh president of Timor-Leste since 2022, having previously been the fourth president from 2007 to 2012. He was a co-recipient of the 1996 Nobel Peace Prize, along with Carlos Filipe Ximenes Belo, for working "towards a just and peaceful solution to the conflict in East Timor".

As a founder and former member of Fretilin, Ramos-Horta served as the exiled spokesman for the East Timorese resistance during the Indonesian occupation of East Timor (1975–1999). While he continued to work with Fretilin, he resigned from the party in 1988, becoming an independent politician.

After Timor-Leste (East Timor) achieved independence in 2002, Ramos-Horta was appointed as the country's first foreign minister. He served in this position until his resignation on 25 June 2006, amidst political turmoil. On 26 June 2006, following the resignation of Prime Minister Mari Alkatiri, Ramos-Horta was appointed as acting prime minister by President Xanana Gusmão. Two weeks later, on 10 July 2006, he was sworn in as the second prime minister of Timor-Leste. He was elected as President in 2007. On 11 February 2008, he was shot during an assassination attempt.

After leaving office as president in 2012, Ramos-Horta was appointed as the United Nations' Special Representative and Head of the United Nations Integrated Peacebuilding Office in Guinea-Bissau (UNIOGBIS) on 2 January 2013. He was re-elected to the presidency in 2022.

== Early life ==
Ramos-Horta was born in 1949 in Dili, the capital of East Timor. He is of Mestiço ethnicity, born to a Portuguese father and Portuguese-Timorese mother. Both his father (Francisco Horta) and maternal grandfather (Arsénio José Filipe) were deported to Timor by Portuguese authorities. He was educated in a Catholic mission in the small village of Soibada, later chosen by Fretilin as its headquarters after the Indonesian invasion. Of his eleven brothers and sisters, four were killed by the Indonesian military.

Ramos-Horta studied public international law at The Hague Academy of International Law in 1983 and at Antioch University in Yellow Springs, Ohio, where he completed an Individualized Master of Arts degree in peace studies with the major area of study being Public International Law and International Relations, awarded in December 1984. He was trained in human rights law at the International Institute of Human Rights in Strasbourg in 1983. He completed post-graduate courses in American foreign policy at Columbia University in 1983.

== Personal life ==
He has been a Senior Associate Member of the University of Oxford's St Antony's College since 1987 and speaks five languages fluently: Portuguese, English, French, Spanish, and the most commonly spoken East Timorese language, Tetum.

Ramos-Horta is divorced from Ana Pessoa Pinto, East Timor's Minister for State and Internal Administration, with whom he has a son, Loro Horta, who was born in exile in Mozambique.

== Political career ==
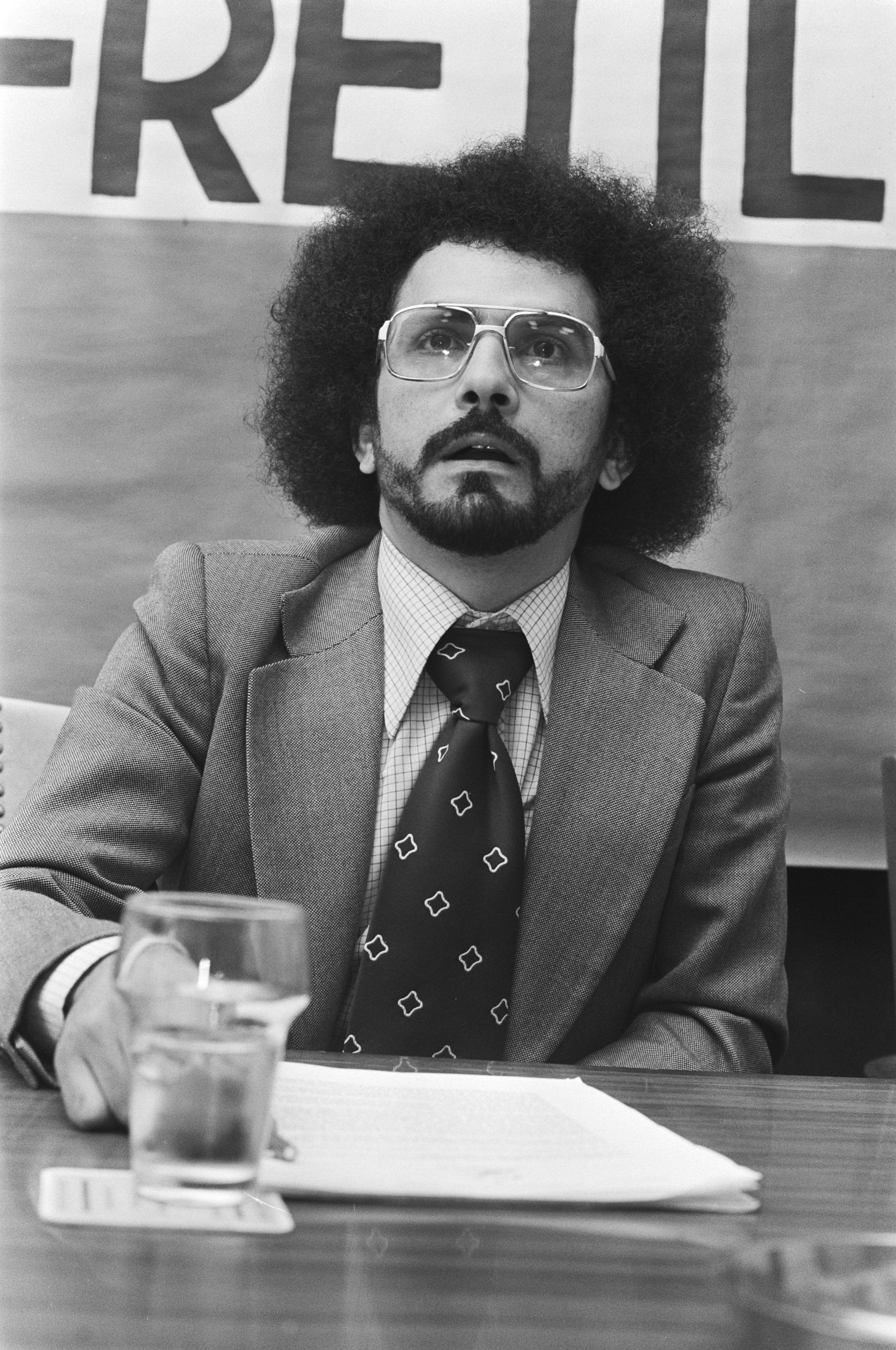
Ramos-Horta in 1976

Ramos-Horta was actively involved in the development of political awareness in Portuguese Timor, which caused him to be exiled for two years in 1970–1971 to Portuguese East Africa. His grandfather, before him, had also been exiled, from Portugal to the Azores Islands, then Cape Verde, Portuguese Guinea and finally to Portuguese Timor.

A moderate in the emerging Timorese nationalist leadership, Ramos-Horta was appointed Foreign Minister in the "Democratic Republic of East Timor" government proclaimed by the pro-independence parties in November 1975. When appointed minister, Ramos-Horta was only 25 years old. Three days before the Indonesian troops invaded, Ramos-Horta left East Timor to plead the Timorese case before the UN.

Ramos-Horta arrived in New York to address the UN Security Council and urge them to take action in the face of the Indonesian occupation during which an estimated 102,000 East Timorese would die. Ramos-Horta was the Permanent Representative of Fretilin to the UN for the next ten years. His friends at that time mentioned that he arrived in the United States with a total of $25 in his pocket. His financial situation was often precarious during that period. He survived partly by the grace of Americans who admired his politics and his determination. Furthermore, he was obliged to travel worldwide to explain his party's position.

In 1993, the Rafto Prize was awarded to the people of East Timor. Foreign-minister-in-exile Ramos-Horta represented his nation at the prize ceremony. In May 1994, Philippine President Fidel Ramos (no relation), bowing to pressure from Jakarta, tried to ban an international conference on East Timor in Manila and blacklisted Ramos-Horta, with the Thai government following suit later that year by declaring him persona non grata.

In December 1996, Ramos-Horta shared the Nobel Peace Prize with fellow Timorese Bishop Ximenes Belo. The Nobel Committee chose to honour the two laureates for their "sustained efforts to hinder the oppression of a small people", hoping that "this award will spur efforts to find a diplomatic solution to the conflict of East Timor based on the people's right to self-determination". On The InnerView, Ramos-Horta said that he utilises the Nobel Peace Prize as a vehicle to advocate on behalf of his country, as well as for the Palestinians and the people of Myanmar.

The Committee considered Ramos-Horta "the leading international spokesman for East Timor's cause since 1975".

Ramos-Horta played a leading role in negotiating the institutional foundations for independence. He led the Timorese delegation at an important joint workshop with UNTAET on 1 March 2000 to tease out a new strategy, and identify institutional needs. The outcome was an agreed blueprint for a joint administration with executive powers, including leaders of the National Congress for Timorese Reconstruction (CNRT). Further details were worked out in a conference in May 2000. The Special Representative of the UN Secretary-General in East Timor, Sérgio Vieira de Mello, presented the new blueprint to a donor conference in Lisbon, on 22 June 2000, and to the UN Security Council on 27 June 2000. On 12 July 2000, the NCC adopted a regulation establishing a Transitional Cabinet composed of four East Timorese and four UNTAET representatives. A further conference on the building of a new nation state was held in April 2001, organised by the International Institute of Asian Studies in Leiden and the Platform for Asian Studies in Amsterdam, in The Hague in the Netherlands. He attended with diplomat Pascoela Barreto. The revamped joint administration successfully laid the institutional foundations for independence, and on 27 September 2002, Timor-Leste joined the United Nations. Ramos-Horta was its first Foreign Minister.

=== Premiership (2006–2007) ===
On 3 June 2006, Ramos-Horta added the post of interim minister of defense to his portfolio as foreign minister, in the wake of the resignations of the previous minister. He resigned as both Foreign and Defence Minister on 25 June 2006, announcing, "I do not wish to be associated with the present government or with any government involving Alkatiri." Prime Minister Alkatiri had been under pressure to resign his position in place of President Xanana Gusmão, but in a 25 June meeting, leaders of the Fretilin party agreed to keep Alkatiri as prime minister; Ramos-Horta resigned immediately following this decision. Foreign Minister of Australia Alexander Downer expressed his personal disappointment at Ramos-Horta's resignation. Following Alkatiri's resignation on 26 June, Ramos-Horta withdrew his resignation to contest the prime ministership and served in the position on a temporary basis until a successor to Alkatiri was named. On 8 July 2006, Ramos-Horta himself was appointed prime minister by President Gusmão. He was sworn in on 10 July.

Before his appointment as prime minister, Ramos-Horta was considered a possible candidate to succeed Kofi Annan as United Nations Secretary-General. He dropped out of the race in order to serve as Timor-Leste's prime minister, but he has indicated that he might run for the UN position at some time in the future: "I can wait five years if I am really interested in the job in 2012. I would be interested in that."

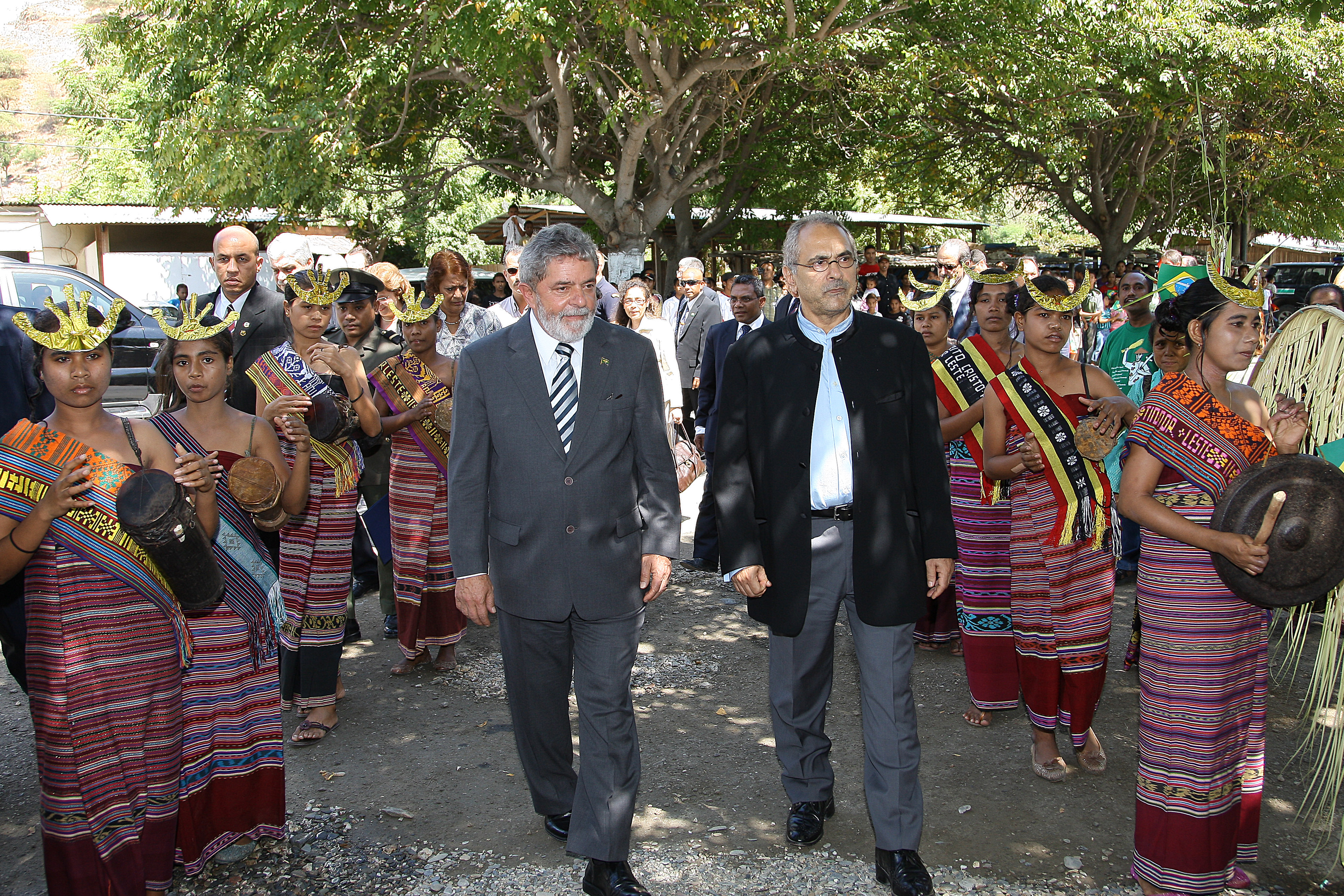
Ramos-Horta with Brazilian President Luiz Inácio Lula da Silva, 2008

=== First election to presidency (2007) ===
In an interview with Al Jazeera broadcast on 22 February 2007, Ramos-Horta said that he would run for president in the April 2007 election. On 25 February 2007, Ramos-Horta formally announced his candidacy. He received the support of Gusmão, who was not running for re-election. In an interview with Global South Development Magazine, Ramos-Horta said that Mahatma Gandhi was his greatest hero.

In the first round of the election, held on 9 April, Ramos-Horta took second place with 21.81% of the vote; he and Fretilin candidate Francisco Guterres, who took first place, then participated in the second round of the election in May. The full results of the runoff elections were made public by Timor-Leste's National Electoral Committee spokeswoman, Maria Angelina Sarmento, on 11 May, and Ramos-Horta won with 69.18% of the vote.

He was inaugurated as President of Timor-Leste in a ceremony at the parliament house in Dili on 20 May 2007. He had resigned as Prime Minister the day before and was succeeded by Estanislau da Silva.

=== Assassination attempt ===
On 11 February 2008, Ramos-Horta was shot in an assassination attempt. In the gun skirmish, one of his guards was wounded, and two rebel soldiers, including rebel leader Alfredo Reinado, were killed. Ramos-Horta was treated at an Australian Defence Force hospital in Dili operated by Aspen Medical, before being transferred to the Royal Darwin Hospital in Australia on board an Aspen Medical air ambulance for further treatment. Doctors thought that he had been shot two or three times with the most serious injury being to his right lung. His condition was listed as critical but stable. He was placed in an induced coma on full life support, and regained consciousness on 21 February. A message from Ramos-Horta, still recovering in Darwin, was broadcast on 12 March. In this message, he thanked his supporters and Australia and said that he had "been very well looked after". A spokesman said that his condition was improving and that he had started taking short daily walks for exercise.

Ramos-Horta was released from the Royal Darwin Hospital on 19 March, although he said that he would stay in Australia for physical therapy for "a few more weeks". He also said on this occasion that he had remained conscious following the shooting and "remember[ed] every detail", describing how he was taken for treatment. On 17 April, he returned to Dili from Darwin. He gave a press conference at the airport in which he urged the remaining rebels in the mountains to surrender.

=== 2012 bid for presidency ===
During the first round of the presidential elections of 2012, held on 17 March, Ramos-Horta, who was eligible for a second and final term as president, took third place with 19.43% of the vote behind the presidential candidates Francisco Guterres with 27.28% and Taur Matan Ruak 24.17% of the vote. He admitted defeat, and his term as president ended on 19 May, with the inauguration of Taur Matan Ruak as his successor.

=== Second election to presidency (2022) ===
Ramos-Horta came out of retirement as he stated that incumbent president Francisco “Lu-Olo” Guterres had violated the constitution. He stated that if he won the presidential election, he would dissolve parliament and call for new elections. His campaign was supported by Xanana Gusmão, who was dubbed the "Kingmaker of Timor-Leste". Ramos-Horta ran on a platform of poverty reduction, increasing healthcare services for mothers and children, as well as increasing job creation. He also stated that he wanted to try and improve communication across the governing political parties for the purposes of increasing stability. In addition, he stated his intention on working with the government to address supply chain issues from the ongoing COVID-19 pandemic and Russian invasion of Ukraine. The runoff was between Ramos-Horta, and the incumbent Francisco Guterres. In the runoff Ramos-Horta received 62.10% of the vote and defeated Guterres in a landslide, who received 37.90% percent of the vote. Speaking to supporters in a rally, Ramos-Horta proclaimed: "I have received this mandate from our people, from the nation in an overwhelming demonstration of our people's commitment to democracy." He added he had not spoken to Guterres personally after the win but had received an invitation from Guterres' office to discuss a handover of power following the election.

The United States Department of State congratulated Ramos-Horta on his election as Timor-Leste's next president and looked forward to strengthen the partnership between the United States and Timor-Leste. In a statement, they praised the election, stating; "We commend Timorese authorities, including the Technical Secretariat for Electoral Administration and the National Elections Commission, for administering a free, fair, and transparent election and the hundreds of thousands of Timorese voters who cast their ballots peacefully. Timor-Leste’s election serves as an inspiration for democracy in Southeast Asia, the Indo-Pacific region, and the world. This achievement represents another milestone in Timor-Leste’s tremendous work to build and strengthen its robust, vibrant democracy over its nearly 20-year history as an independent nation." His victory was also congratulated by the President of Portugal Marcelo Rebelo de Sousa giving "the warmest congratulations on the election as president of the Republic of Timor-Leste".

Ramos-Horta was sworn in as president of Timor-Leste in a peaceful transfer of power on 20 May 2022; the 20th independence anniversary of Timor-Leste.

== Other activities ==
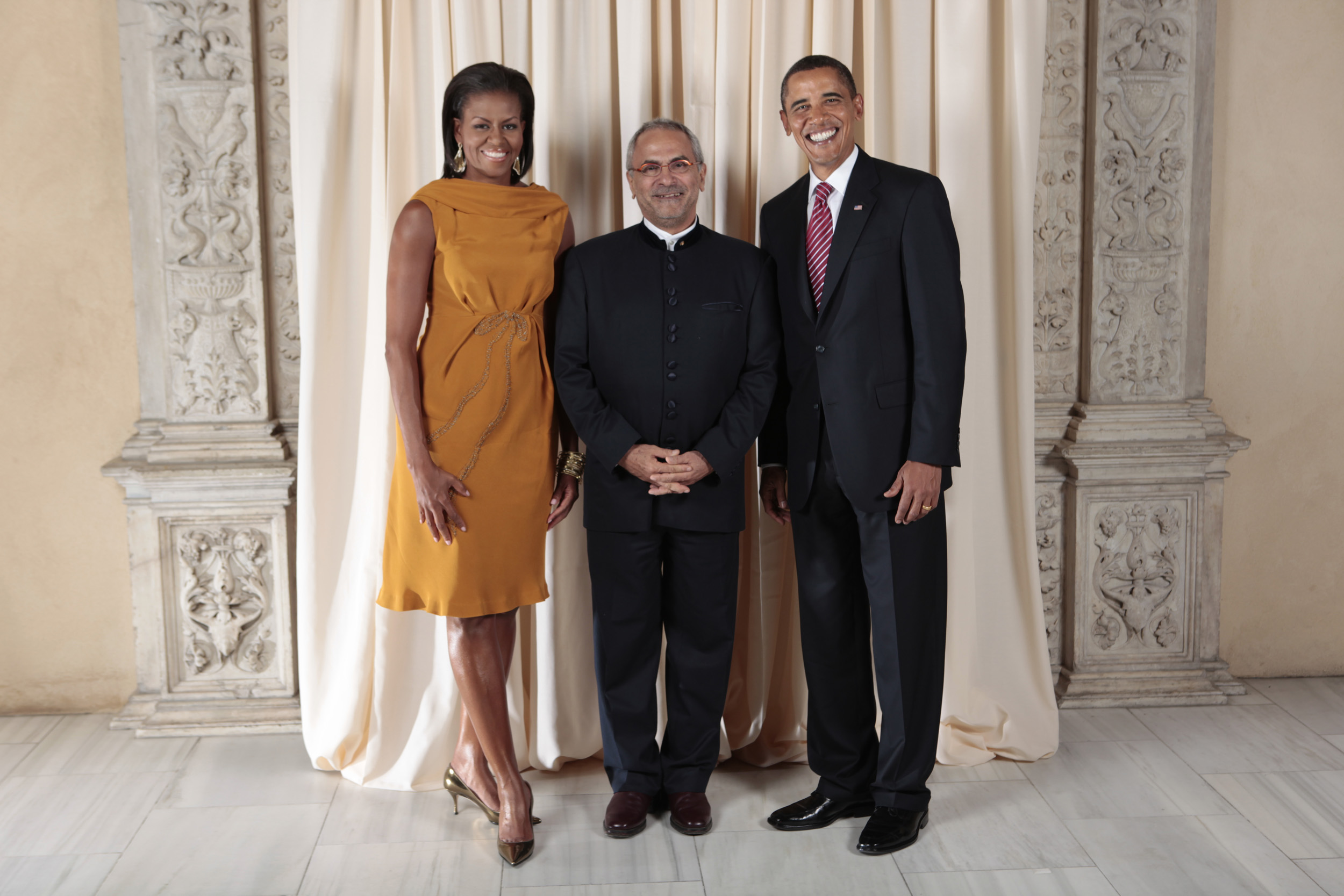
Ramos-Horta with United States President Barack Obama and First Lady Michelle Obama

Following the 2012 Guinea-Bissau coup d'état, he offered to mediate the conflict. He also served as the UN special envoy to the country.

He is the author of the book Words of Hope in Troubled Times.

Ramos-Horta has served as chairman of the advisory board for TheCommunity.com, a web site for peace and human rights, since 2000. In 2001 he gathered the post-9/11 statements of 28 Nobel Peace Prize Laureates on the web site, and has spearheaded other peace initiatives with his fellow Nobel Laureates.

Ramos-Horta supported the U.S. invasion and occupation of Iraq and condemned the anti-American tone of its detractors as "hypocritical". In the 1990s he had supported the cause of Kurdish people in Iraq.

In May 2009 Ramos-Horta stated that he would ask the International Criminal Court to investigate the ruling junta of Myanmar if they continue to detain fellow Nobel Laureate Aung San Suu Kyi. Ramos-Horta suggested that Suu Kyi's inability to express her frustration with the treatment of Rohingya Muslims was due to the fact that she lacked the political power to effect change.

However, by August 2010, he had softened his views on Myanmar, warmly receiving the Myanmar Foreign Minister Nyan Win, and said that he wanted to improve relations and seek strong commercial ties with Myanmar.

In 2006, Ramos-Horta pledged his support for the International Simultaneous Policy (SIMPOL) which seeks to end the usual deadlock in tackling global issues.

On 5 August 2009, he attended the funeral of the former president of the Philippines Corazon Aquino. He was the only foreign head of state to attend. On 30 June 2010, he attended the inauguration of Benigno S. Aquino III, the 15th President of the Philippines. He was, again, the only head of state who attended the inauguration and the first dignitary to arrive in the Philippines for the inauguration.

Ramos-Horta is a Member of the Global Leadership Foundation, an organization which works to support democratic leadership, prevent and resolve conflict through mediation and promote good governance in the form of democratic institutions, open markets, human rights and the rule of law. It does so by making available, discreetly and in confidence, the experience of former leaders to today's national leaders. It is a not-for-profit organization composed of former heads of government, senior governmental and international organization officials who work closely with Heads of Government on governance-related issues of concern to them.

In August 2017, ten Nobel Peace Prize laureates, including Ramos-Horta, urged Saudi Arabia to stop the executions of 14 young people for participating in the 2011–12 Saudi Arabian protests.

He is also a television presenter of Horta Show in Radio-Televisão Timor Leste.

In 2021 Ramos-Horta joined the judging committee for the Zayed Award for Human Fraternity, an annual award instituted "to promote human fraternity values around the world and to fulfill the aspirations of the Document on Human Fraternity, co-signed by His Holiness Pope Francis and His Eminence the Grand Imam of Al-Azhar Professor Ahmed Al-Tayeb in 2019". The first meeting of the committee was held in the Vatican with Pope Francis on 6 October 2021.

== Awards ==
=== Nobel Prize ===
The Roman Catholic bishop Ximenes Belo of East Timor and Ramos-Horta were jointly awarded the 1996 Nobel Peace Prize for their efforts.

==== Other awards ====
- Golden Plate Award of the American Academy of Achievement (2002)

=== Honours ===
- Australia
  - Honorary Companion of the Order of Australia (25 November 2013)
- Cape Verde
  - 1st Class of the Amílcar Cabral Order (6 July 2011)
- Cuba
  - Order of José Martí (6 December 2010)
- Guinea Bissau
  - Recipient of the Medal of Amílcar Cabral (17 July 2025)
- Portugal
  - Grand Collar of the Order of Camões (31 October 2022)
  - Grand Collar of the Order of Prince Henry (13 November 2007)
  - Grand-Cross of the Order of Liberty, Portugal (9 June 1998)

- Conferred an Honorary Doctorate in Political Science by the University of Cambodia (2010)

== Film depictions ==
The 2000 documentary The Diplomat, directed by Tom Zubrycki, follows Ramos-Horta in the period from 1998 to his return to East Timor in 2000. Ramos-Horta is played by Oscar Isaac in the 2009 film Balibo. The film tells the story of the Balibo Five and the events preceding the Indonesian occupation of East Timor.

== See also ==
- 2007 East Timorese presidential election
- 2012 East Timorese presidential election
- List of peace activists

== Notes ==
Political offices
Preceded by Mari Alkatiri	Prime Minister of East Timor; 2006–2007	Succeeded by Estanislau da Silva
Preceded by Xanana Gusmão	President of East Timor; 2007–2012	Succeeded by Taur Matan Ruak
Preceded by Francisco Guterres	President of East Timor; 2022–present	Incumbent
Party political offices
First	CNRT nominee for President of East Timor; 2022	Most recent
