= Minister of Finance (Timor-Leste) =

East Timorese government minister

- Ministra das Finanças (Portuguese); Ministra Finansas (Tetum)
- Coat of Arms of Timor-Leste

- Flag of Timor-Leste

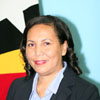
- Incumbent; Santina Viegas Cardoso since 1 July 2023
- Ministry of Finance
- Style: Minister (informal); Her Excellency (formal, diplomatic)
- Member of: Constitutional Government
- Reports to: Prime Minister
- Appointer: President of Timor-Leste (following proposal by the Prime Minister of Timor-Leste)
- Inaugural holder: Juvenal Maria de Fátima Inácio Sera Key; (1975); Michael Francino; (2000)
- Formation: 1975 / 2000
- Website: Ministry of Finance

The Minister of Finance (Portuguese: Ministra das Finanças, Tetum: Ministra Finansas) is a senior member of the Constitutional Government of Timor-Leste heading the Ministry of Finance.

== Functions ==
Under the Constitution of Timor-Leste, the Minister has the power and the duty:

1. to implement the policy defined for the Ministry of Finance;
2. to ensure relations between the Government and the other organs of the State in the area of responsibility of the Ministry.

Where the Minister is in charge of the subject matter of a government statute, the Minister is also required, together with the Prime Minister, to sign the statute.

== Incumbent ==
The incumbent minister is Santina Viegas Cardoso.

== List of ministers ==
The following individuals have been appointed as the minister:

No.	Party	Minister	Portrait	Government (Prime Minister)	Term start	Term end	Term in office
1	Fretilin	Juvenal Maria de Fátima Inácio Sera Key		1975 CoM (Lobato)	1 December 1975	17 December 1975	16 days
2	United Nations	Michael Francino		I UNTAET (Vieira de Mello)	15 July 2000	20 September 2001	1 year, 67 days
3	Independent	Fernanda Mesquita Borges		II UNTAET (Alkatiri)	20 September 2001	23 April 2002	215 days
4	Fretilin	Maria Madalena Brites Boavida		II UNTAET (Alkatiri)	30 April 2002	20 May 2002	5 years, 100 days
4	Fretilin	Maria Madalena Brites Boavida		I Constitutional (Alkatiri)	20 May 2002	10 July 2006	5 years, 100 days
4	Fretilin	Maria Madalena Brites Boavida		II Constitutional (Ramos-Horta)	10 July 2006	19 May 2007	5 years, 100 days
4	Fretilin	Maria Madalena Brites Boavida		III Constitutional (da Silva)	19 May 2007	8 August 2007	5 years, 100 days
5	Independent	Emília Pires		IV Constitutional (Gusmão)	8 August 2007	8 August 2012	7 years, 192 days
5	Independent	Emília Pires		V Constitutional (Gusmão)	8 August 2012	16 February 2015	7 years, 192 days
6		Santina Cardoso		VI Constitutional (Araújo)	16 February 2015	15 September 2017	2 years, 211 days
7	Independent	Rui Augusto Gomes		VII Constitutional (Alkatiri)	15 September 2017	22 June 2018	280 days
(acting)	CNRT	Sara Lobo Brites		VIII Constitutional (Ruak)	22 June 2018	29 May 2020	1 year, 342 days
8	Fretilin	Fernando Hanjam		VIII Constitutional (Ruak) (restructured)	29 May 2020	5 November 2020	134 days
(acting)	Independent	Sara Lobo Brites		VIII Constitutional (Ruak) (restructured)	5 November 2020	23 November 2020	18 days
(7)	Independent	Rui Augusto Gomes		VIII Constitutional (Ruak) (restructured)	23 November 2020	1 July 2023	2 years, 220 days
(6)	CNRT	Santina Viegas Cardoso		IX Constitutional (Gusmão)	1 July 2023	Incumbent	3 years, 68 days
