= Politics of Timor-Leste =

The political system in Timor-Leste is a unitary semi-presidential representative democratic republic, whereby the prime minister of Timor-Leste is the head of government and the president of Timor-Leste functions as head of state. Timor-Leste has a multi-party system. Executive power is exercised by the president and the government. Legislative power is vested in both the government and the National Parliament. The judiciary is independent of the executive and the legislature. The East Timorese constitution was modelled on that of Portugal, with lesser power given to the president. The country is still in the process of building its administration and governmental institutions. The Economist Intelligence Unit rated Timor-Leste a "flawed democracy" in 2024. The country also had the highest electoral and liberal democracy scores in Southeast Asia in 2026, according to the V-Dem Democracy Indices.

== Executive branch ==
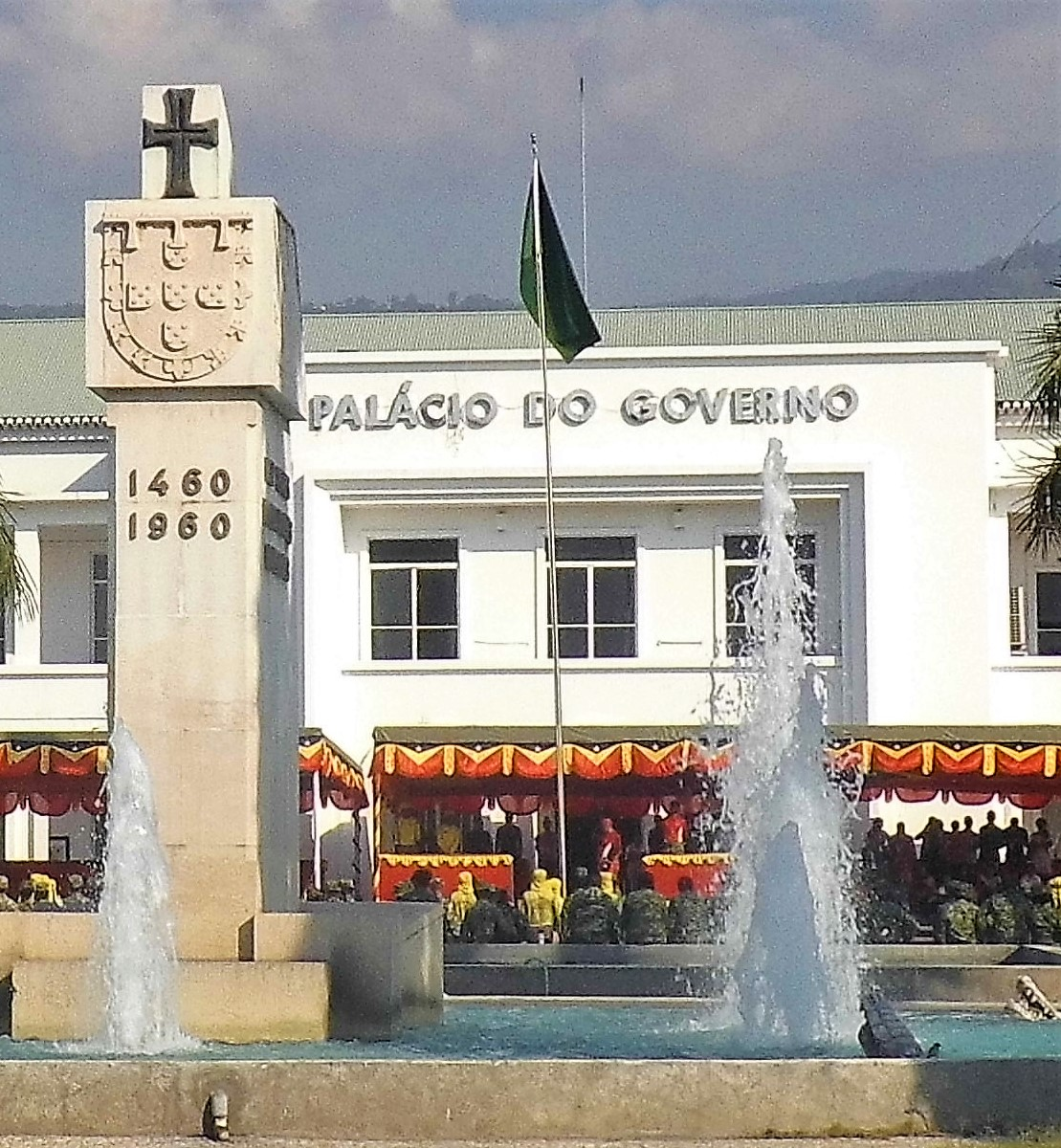
Government Palace in Dili

The head of state of the East Timorese republic is the president, who is directly elected by popular vote for a five-year term, and whose executive powers are somewhat limited by the constitution, the president is able to veto legislation, however this action can be overridden by the parliament. Following elections, the president usually appoints the leader of the majority party or majority coalition as the prime minister,. As head of government the prime minister presides over the cabinet.

Main office-holders
| Office | Name | Party | Since |
|---|---|---|---|
| President | José Ramos-Horta | CNRT | 20 May 2022 |
| Prime Minister | Xanana Gusmão | CNRT | 1 July 2023 |

== Legislative branch ==
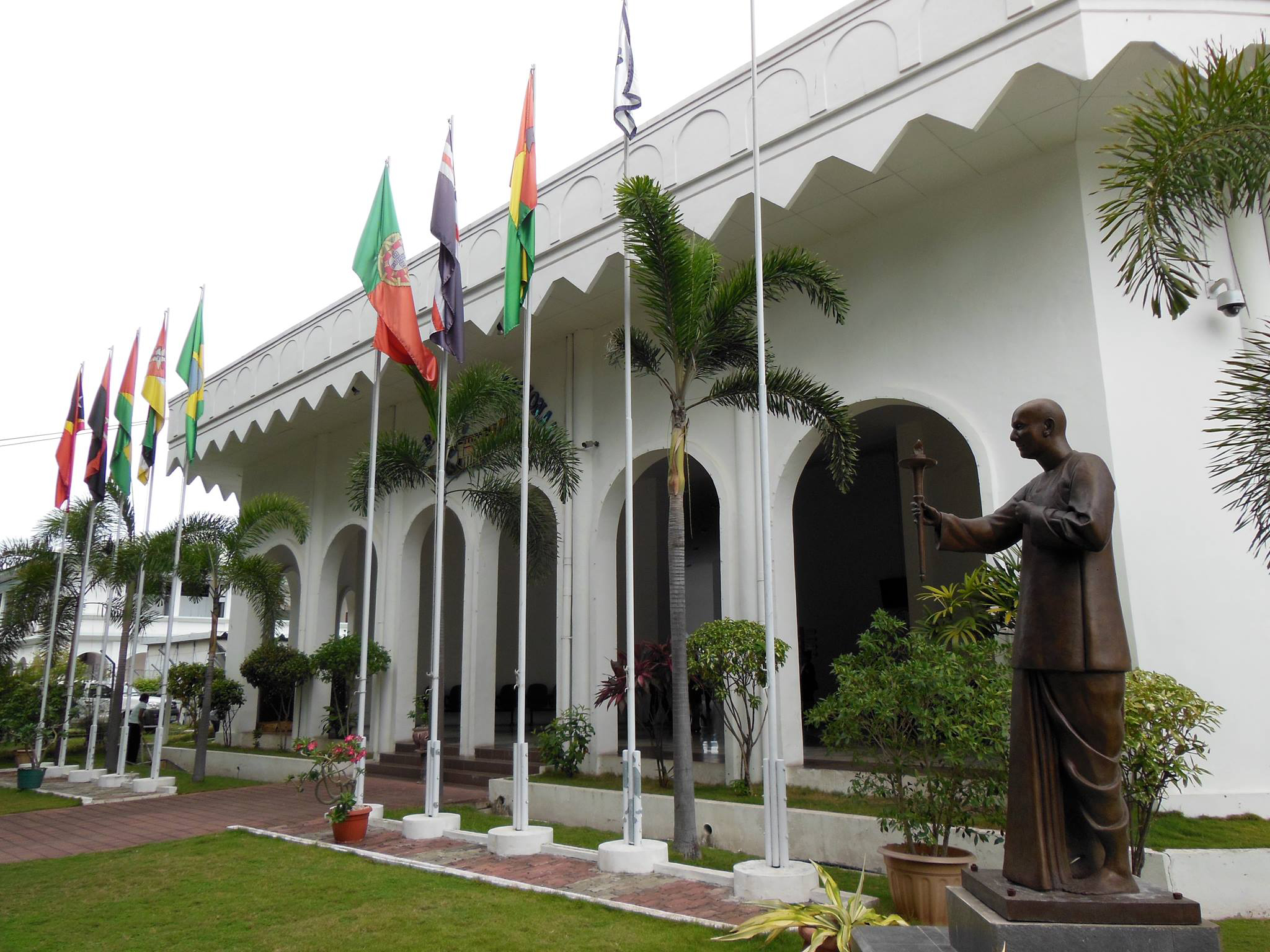
Parliament of Timor-Leste

The unicameral Timorese National Parliament (Parlamento Nacional) has 65 members elected by proportional representation (d'Hondt method) for a five-year term. The number of seats can vary from a minimum of 52 to a maximum of 65, with the exception of the first parliament, which included 88 members who previously served as the Constitutional Assembly six years rather than five (2001-2007). The longer term was in part due to the constitustion being put in place in 2002.

The East Timorese constitution was modelled after that of Portugal. The country is still in the process of building its administration and governmental institutions.

== Political parties and elections ==
=== Presidential elections ===
| Candidate | Party | First round | | Second round | |
| Candidate | Party | Votes | % | Votes | % |
|---|---|---|---|---|---|
| José Ramos-Horta | National Congress for Timorese Reconstruction | 303,477 | 46.56 | 398,028 | 62.10 |
| Francisco Guterres | Fretilin | 144,282 | 22.13 | 242,939 | 37.90 |
| Armanda Berta dos Santos | Kmanek Haburas Unidade Nasional Timor Oan | 56,690 | 8.70 | | |
| Lere Anan Timur | Independent | 49,314 | 7.57 | | |
| Mariano Sabino Lopes | Democratic Party | 47,334 | 7.26 | | |
| Anacleto Bento Ferreira | Democratic Republic of Timor-Leste Party | 13,205 | 2.03 | | |
| Martinho Germano da Silva Gusmão | United Party for Development and Democracy | 8,598 | 1.32 | | |
| Hermes da Rosa Correia Barros | Independent | 8,030 | 1.23 | | |
| Milena Pires | Independent | 5,430 | 0.83 | | |
| Isabel da Costa Ferreira | Independent | 4,219 | 0.65 | | |
| Felizberto Araújo Duarte | Independent | 2,709 | 0.42 | | |
| Constâncio da Conceção Pinto | Independent | 2,520 | 0.39 | | |
| Rogerio Lobato | Independent | 2,058 | 0.32 | | |
| Virgílio da Silva Guterres | Independent | 1,720 | 0.26 | | |
| Antero Benedito Silva | Independent | 1,562 | 0.24 | | |
| Ángela Freitas | Independent | 711 | 0.11 | | |
| Total | | 651,859 | 100.00 | 640,967 | 100.00 |
| Valid votes | | 651,859 | 98.16 | 640,967 | 99.16 |
| Invalid/blank votes | | 12,247 | 1.84 | 5,422 | 0.84 |
| Total votes | | 664,106 | 100.00 | 646,389 | 100.00 |
| Registered voters/turnout | | 859,613 | 77.26 | 859,925 | 75.17 |
Source: National Election Commission

=== Parliamentary elections ===
| Party | Votes | % | Seats | +/– |
|---|---|---|---|---|
| National Congress for Timorese Reconstruction | 288,289 | 41.63 | 31 | +10 |
| Fretilin | 178,338 | 25.75 | 19 | –4 |
| Democratic Party | 64,517 | 9.32 | 6 | +1 |
| Kmanek Haburas Unidade Nasional Timor Oan | 52,031 | 7.51 | 5 | 0 |
| People's Liberation Party | 40,720 | 5.88 | 4 | –4 |
| Green Party of Timor | 25,106 | 3.63 | 0 | New |
| United Party for Development and Democracy | 21,647 | 3.13 | 0 | –1 |
| Timorese Monarchist People's Association | 6,678 | 0.96 | 0 | 0 |
| People's Freedom Party of Aileba | 3,272 | 0.47 | 0 | 0 |
| Timorese Social Democratic Action Center | 3,170 | 0.46 | 0 | 0 |
| Socialist Party of Timor | 2,415 | 0.35 | 0 | 0 |
| Republican Party | 1,558 | 0.22 | 0 | 0 |
| Christian Democratic Party | 1,262 | 0.18 | 0 | 0 |
| Timorese Democratic Union | 1,256 | 0.18 | 0 | –1 |
| National Unity of Timorese Resistance | 1,023 | 0.15 | 0 | 0 |
| Freedom Movement for the Maubere People | 642 | 0.09 | 0 | 0 |
| National Development Party | 597 | 0.09 | 0 | 0 |
| Total | 692,521 | 100.00 | 65 | 0 |
| Valid votes | 692,521 | 98.13 | | |
| Invalid votes | 10,473 | 1.48 | | |
| Blank votes | 2,698 | 0.38 | | |
| Total votes | 705,692 | 100.00 | | |
| Registered voters/turnout | 890,145 | 79.28 | | |
Source: CNE, Tatoli

== Recent developments ==
Francisco Guterres, known as Lú-Olo, of the Revolutionary Front for an Independent East Timor (Fretilin) was elected president in 2017 and held the position until May 2022. The Alliance for Change and Progress (AMP), a three-party alliance, attempted to form a coalition with National Congress for Timorese Reconstruction, led by former president Xanana Gusmao, but the talks failed and Fretilin formed a minority government with the Timorese Democratic Party (DP) in September 2017. In October that year, the three opposition parties formed an alliance called Parliamentary Majority Oppositional Alliance (AOMP), and following pressures from this opposition alliance, president Guterres decided to dissolve the parliament in January 2018. This led to the second general election in May 2018. In June 2018, former president Jose Maria de Vasconcelos known as Taur Matan Ruak of the Alliance of Change for Progress (AMP), became the new prime minister. José Ramos-Horta of the centre-left CNRT has served as the president of Timor-Leste since 20 May 2022 after winning the April 2022 presidential election runoff.

In parliamentary elections held on Sunday, May 21, 2023, the opposition party led by Xanana Gusmao won 41% of the vote, making him likely to return as prime minister of the country in a coalition with at least one other party.

The country acceded to the Association of Southeast Asian Nations (ASEAN) as a full member on October 26, 2025, during its 47th summit in Kuala Lumpur, Malaysia. The Accession of Timor-Leste to ASEAN began with the country's independence from Indonesia in 2002.

== Judicial branch ==
The Supreme Court of Justice has one judge appointed by the National Parliament and the rest appointed by the Superior Council for the Judiciary. As mentioned in a 2010 source, the country was in the process of developing a legal system that includes private practice attorneys.

== Administrative divisions ==
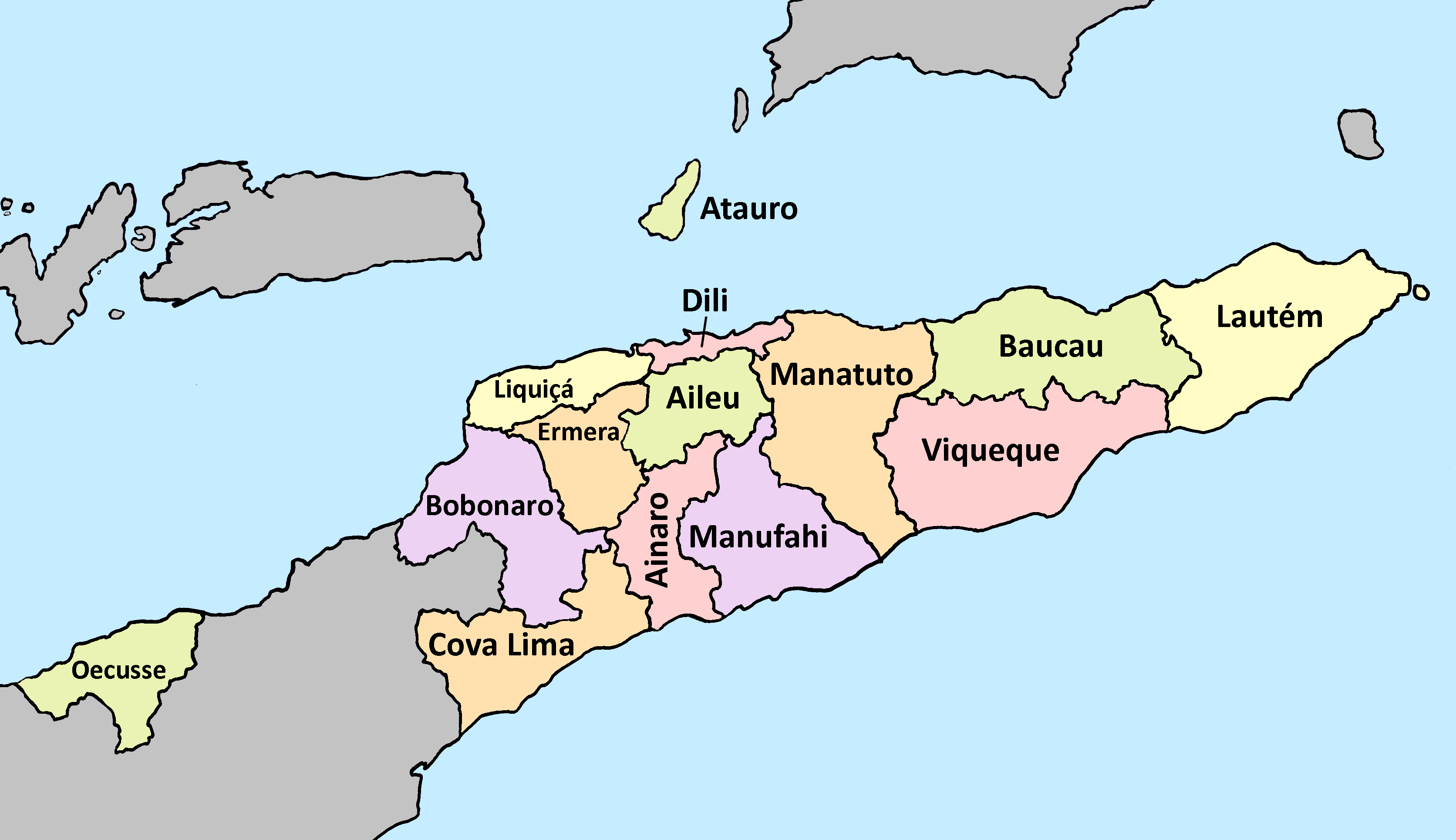
Map of the districts of Timor-Leste.

Timor-Leste is divided into fourteen municipalities:

1. Lautém
2. Baucau
3. Viqueque
4. Manatuto
5. Dili
6. Aileu
7. Manufahi
8. Liquiçá
9. Ermera
10. Ainaro
11. Bobonaro
12. Cova Lima
13. Oecusse
14. Atauro

The districts are subdivided into 65 subdistricts, 443 sucos and 2,336 towns, villages and hamlets. "Ministerial Order" (PDF). Archived from the original on 10 January 2005. (213 KiB)

== Cabinet ==
Gusmão III (2023–present)

Official Gazette of Announced Council of Ministers

Matan Ruak (2018–2023)

| Minister | Name |
|---|---|
| Prime Minister; Minister of the Interior | Taur Matan Ruak |
| Deputy Prime Minister; Minister of Social Solidarity and Inclusion | Armanda Berta dos Santos |
| Deputy Prime Minister; Minister of Planning and Territory | Jose Reis |
| Minister of the Presidency of the Council of Ministers | Fidelis Leite Magalhães |
| Coordinating Minister of Economic Affairs | Joaquim Amaral |
| Minister for Legislative Reform and Parliamentary Affairs | Francisco Martins da Costa Pereira Jerónimo |
| Minister of Finance | Fernando Hanjam |
| Minister for Foreign Affairs and Cooperation | Adaljiza Magno |
| Minister of Justice | Manuel Cárceres da Costa |
| Minister of State Administration | Miguel Pereira de Carvalho |
| Minister of Health | Odete Maria Belo |
| Minister of Education, Youth and Sports | Armindo Maia |
| Minister of Higher Education, Science and Culture | Longuinhos dos Santos |
| Minister for the Affairs of National Liberation Combatants | Júlio Sarmento da Costa "Meta Mali" |
| Minister of Public Works | Salvador Soares dos Reis Pires |
| Minister of Transport and Communications | José Agustinho da Silva |
| Minister of Tourism, Trade and Industry | José Lucas do Carmo da Silva |
| Minister of Agriculture and Fisheries | Pedro dos Reis |
| Minister of Defense | Filomeno da Paixão de Jesus |
| Minister of Petroleum and Mineral | Víctor da Conceição Soares |

Alkatiri II (2017–2018)

| Minister | Name |
|---|---|
| Prime Minister | Mari Alkatiri |
| Minister of Development and Institutional Reform | Mari Alkatiri |
| Minister of State | José Ramos-Horta |
| Minister of State | Rui Maria de Araújo |
| Minister of State | Estanislau da Silva |
| Minister of State | Mariano Assanami Sabino |
| Deputy Minister of the Prime Minister | Hermenegildo Augusto Cabral Pereira |
| Deputy Minister of the Prime Minister | José Maria dos Reis |
| Counselor for National Security | José Ramos-Horta |
| Presidency of the Council of Ministers | Adriano do Nascimento |
| Minister of Foreign Affairs and Cooperation | Aurélio Guterres |
| Minister of Defence and Security | José Agostinho Sequeira ("Somotxo") |
| Minister of Interior | |
| Minister of Planning and Finance | Rui Gomes |
| Deputy Minister of Housing, Planning and Environment | Abrão Gabriel Santos Oliveira |
| Minister of Justice | |
| Deputy Minister of Justice | Sebastião Dias Ximenes |
| Minister of Health | Rui Maria de Araújo |
| Deputy Minister of Health | Luís Maria Ribeiro Freitas Lobato |
| Minister of Education and Culture | Fernando Hanjam |
| Vice Minister of Education and Culture | Lurdes Bessa |
| Deputy Minister of Education and Culture | José António de Jesus das Neves |
| Minister of State Administration | Valentim Ximenes |
| Deputy Minister of State Administration | José Anuno |
| Minister of Commerce, Industry and Environment | António Conceição |
| Deputy Minister of Commerce and Industry | Jacinto Gusmão |
| Minister of Social Solidarity | Florentina da Conceição Pereira Martins Smith |
| Minister of Public Works, Transport and Communications | |
| Deputy Minister of Public Works | Mariano Renato Monteiro da Cruz |
| Deputy Minister of Transport and Communications | Inácio Freitas Moreira |
| Minister of Agriculture and Fisheries | Estanislau da Silva |
| Deputy Minister of Agriculture and Fisheries | Cipriano Esteves Doutel Ferreira |
| Minister of Tourism and Art | |
| Minister of Petroleum | Hernani Filomena Coelho da Silva |
| Minister of Mineral Resources | Mariano Assanami Sabino |

Araújo (2015–2017)

| Minister | Name |
|---|---|
| Prime Minister | Rui Maria de Araújo |
| Minister of State | Hermenegildo Ágio Pereira |
| Minister of State | Fernando La Sama de Araújo (Coordinating Minister of Social) |
| Minister of State | Estanislau da Conceição Aleixo Maria da Silva (Coordinating Minister of Economy) |
| Minister of State | Dionísio da Costa Babo Soares (Coordinating Minister of State Administration Affairs and Justice) |
| Presidency of the Council of Ministers | Hermenegildo Ágio Pereira |
| Minister of Foreign Affairs and Cooperation | Hernâni Coelho |
| Vice-Minister of Foreign Affairs and Cooperation | Roberto Sarmento de Oliveira Soares |
| Minister of Defence | Cirilio José Cristóvão |
| Vice-Minister of Defence | N/A |
| Minister of Interior | Longuinhos Monteiro |
| Vice-Minister of Interior | N/A |
| Minister of Finance | Santina Cardoso |
| Vice-Minister of Finance | Hélder Lopes |
| Minister of Justice | Ivo Jorge Valente |
| Vice-Minister of Justice | N/A |
| Minister of Health | Maria do Céu Sarmento |
| Vice-Minister for Health | Ana Isabel Soares |
| Minister of Education | Fernando La Sama de Araújo |
| Vice-Minister of Education I | Dulce Soares |
| Vice-Minister of Education II | Abel da Costa Freitas Ximenes |
| Minister of State Administration | Dionísio da Costa Babo Soares |
| Vice-Minister of State Administration | Tomás do Rosário Cabral |
| Minister of Commerce, Industry and Environment | António da Conceição |
| Vice-Minister of Commerce, Industry and Environment | Constâncio da Conceição Pinto |
| Minister of Social Solidarity | Isabel Amaral Guterres |
| Vice-Minister of Social Solidarity | Miguel Marques Gonçalves Manetelu |
| Minister of Public Works, Transport and Communications | Gastão Francisco de Sousa |
| Vice-Minister of Public Works, Transport and Communications I | Januário da Costa Pereira |
| Vice-Minister of Public Works, Transport and Communications II | Inácio Moreira |
| Minister of Agriculture and Fisheries | Estanislau da Conceição Aleixo Maria da Silva |
| Vice-Minister of Agriculture and Fisheries | Marcos da Cruz |
| Minister of Tourism, Art and Culture | Francisco Kalbuadi Lay |
| Vice-Minister of Tourism, Art and Culture | N/A |
| Minister of Petroleum and Mineral Resources | Alfredo Pires |
| Vice-Minister of Petroleum and Mineral Resources | N/A |
| Minister of Planning and Strategic Investment | Xanana Gusmão |
| Vice-Minister of Planning and Strategic Investment | N/A |

Gusmão II (2012-2015)

| Minister | Name |
|---|---|
| Prime Minister | Kay Rala Xanana Gusmão |
| Vice Prime Minister | Fernando La Sama de Araújo |
| Minister of State | Agio Pereira |
| Minister of State | José Luís Guterres |
| Presidency of the Council of Ministers | Agio Pereira |
| Minister of Coordinator of Social Affairs | Fernando La Sama de Araújo |
| Minister of Foreign Affairs and Cooperation | José Luís Guterres |
| Vice-Minister of Foreign Affairs and Cooperation | Constâncio da Conceição Pinto |
| Minister of Defence and Security | Xanana Gusmão |
| Vice-Minister of Defence and Security | N/A |
| Minister of Finance | Emília Pires |
| Vice-Minister of Finance | Santina Cardoso |
| Minister of Justice | Dionísio Babo Soares |
| Vice-Minister of Justice | Ivo Jorge Valente |
| Minister of Health | Sérgio Lobo |
| Vice-Minister for Ethnics and Service Delivery | Natália de Araújo |
| Vice-Minister for Management, Support and Resources | Maria do Céu Sarmento |
| Minister of Education | Bendito Freitas |
| Vice-Minister of Basic/Primary Education | Dulce Soares |
| Vice-Minister of Secondary Education | Virgílio Simith |
| Vice-Minister of Higher Education | Marçal Avelino Ximenes |
| Minister of State Administration | Jorge Teme |
| Vice-Minister of State Administration | N/A |
| Minister of Commerce, Industry and Environment | António da Conceição |
| Vice-Minister of Commerce, Industry and Environment | Abel da Costa Ximenes |
| Minister of Social Solidarity | Isabel Amaral Guterres |
| Vice-Minister of Social Solidarity | Jacinto Rigoberto de Deus |
| Minister of Public Works | Gastão Francisco de Sousa |
| Vice-Minister of Public Works | N/A |
| Minister of Transport and Communications | Pedro Lay |
| Vice-Minister of Transport and Communications | Flávio Cardoso Neves |
| Minister of Agriculture and Fisheries | Mariano Assanami Sabino |
| Vice-Minister of Agriculture and Fisheries | Marcos da Cruz |
| Minister of Tourism | Francisco Kalbuadi Lay |
| Vice-Minister of Tourism | N/A |
| Minister of Petroleum and Mineral Resources | Alfredo Pires |
| Vice-Minister of Petroleum and Mineral Resources | N/A |

Gusmão I (2007-2012)

| Minister | Name |
|---|---|
| Prime Minister | Kay Rala Xanana Gusmão |
| Vice Prime Minister | José Luís Guterres (Social Affairs) |
| Vice Prime Minister | ? (Management and State Administration) |
| Minister of Defence and Security | Xanana Gusmão |
| Vice-Minister of Defence and Security | N/A |
| Minister of Foreign Affairs and Cooperation | Zacarias da Costa |
| Vice-Minister of Foreign Affairs and Cooperation | N/A |
| Minister of Finance | Emília Pires |
| Vice-Minister of Finance | Rui Manuel Hajam |
| Minister of Justice | Lúcia Lobato |
| Vice-Minister of Justice | N/A |
| Minister of Health | Nelson Martins |
| Vice-Minister of Health | Madalena Hanjam |
| Minister of Education | João Câncio Freitas |
| Vice-Minister of Education | Paulo Assis Belo |
| Minister of Internal Administration | Arcângelo Leite |
| Vice-Minister of Internal Administration | N/A |
| Minister of Economy and Development | João Gonçalves |
| Vice-Minister of Economy and Development | Cristiano da Costa |
| Minister of Social Solidarity | Maria Domingas Alves |
| Vice-Minister of Social Solidarity | N/A |
| Minister of Public Works | Gastão Francisco de Sousa |
| Vice-Minister of Public Works | N/A |
| Minister of Infrastructure | Pedro Lay |
| Vice-Minister of Infrastructure | José Manuel Carrascalão |
| Minister of Transport, Communications and Public Works | Ovidio D. J. Amaral |
| Vice-Minister of Transport, Communications and Public Works | N/A |
| Minister of Agriculture and Fisheries | Mariano Assanami Sabino |
| Vice-Minister of Agriculture and Fisheries | N/A |
| Minister of Tourism, Commerce and Industry | Gil Alves |
| Vice-Minister of Tourism, Commerce and Industry | N/A |

Alkatiri I (2002-2007)

| Minister | Name |
|---|---|
| Prime Minister | Marí Bim Amude Alkatiri |
| Vice Prime Minister | N/A |
| Minister of State | Anna Pessoa Pinto |
| Minister of State | Jose Ramos Horta |
| Vice-Minister of State | Olimpio Branco |
| Presidency of the Council of Ministers | Anna Pessoa Pinto |
| Minister of Foreign Affairs and Cooperation | Jose Ramos Horta |
| Vice-Minister of Foreign Affairs and Cooperation | Olimpio Branco |
| Minister of Internal Affairs | Rogerio Tiago Lobato |
| Vice-Minister of Internal Affairs | Alcino Baris |
| Minister of Planning and Finance | Maria M. B. Boavida |
| Vice-Minister of Planning and Finance | Aicha Bassarewan |
| Minister of Justice | Domingos Maria Sarmento |
| Vice-Minister of Justice | Manuel Abrantes |
| Minister of Health | Rui Maria de Araujo |
| Vice-Minister of Health | Luis Maria Lobato |
| Minister of Education, Culture, Youth and Sports | Armindo Maia |
| Vice-Minister of Education, Culture, Youth and Sports | Rosaria Corte-Real |
| Minister of Internal Administration | Anna Pessoa Pinto |
| Vice-Minister of Internal Administration | Ilda M. da Conceicao |
| Minister of Development and Environment | ? |
| Vice-Minister of Development and Environment | Abel Da C. F. Ximenes |
| Minister of Transport, Communications and Public Works | Ovidio D. J. Amaral |
| Vice-Minister of Transport, Communications and Public Works | Arq Cesar V. Moreira |
| Minister of Agriculture, Forestry and Fisheries | Estanislau A. da Silva |
| Vice-Minister of Agriculture, Forestry and Fisheries | F. De Sa Benevides |
