= Fernando Hanjam =

East Timorese politician and academic

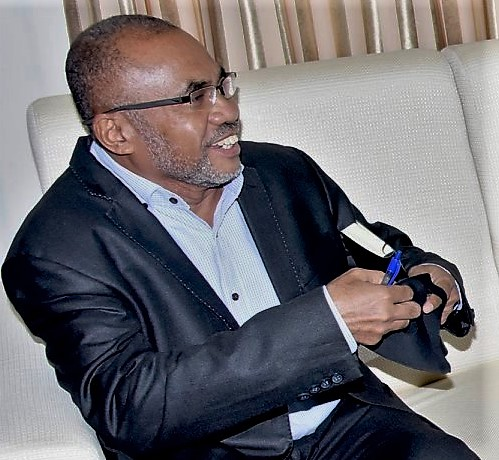
- Hanjam in 2020

Minister of Finance
- In office 29 May 2020 – 5 November 2020
- Prime Minister: Taur Matan Ruak
- Preceded by: Rui Gomes
- Succeeded by: Rui Gomes

Minister of Education and Culture
- In office 3 October 2017 – 22 June 2018
- Prime Minister: Mari Alkatiri
- Preceded by: Antonio da Conceição
- Succeeded by: Dulce de Jesus Soares

Personal details
- Education: Sanata Dharma University; Satya Wacana Christian University; University of Aveiro

Fernando Hanjam is an East Timorese politician and academic. In 2020, he served briefly as the Minister of Finance under the VIII Constitutional Government of East Timor led by Prime Minister Taur Matan Ruak. Previously, in 2017–18, he was Minister of Education and Culture in the earlier VII Constitutional Government, led by Mari Alkatiri.

== Early life and career ==
Hanjam hails from the Oecusse-Ambeno exclave in the west of East Timor. He attended SMA Seminari Lalian Atambua, in Belu Regency, East Nusa Tenggara, Indonesia. He then studied management at Sanata Dharma University, Yogyakarta, Indonesia, and at Satya Wacana Christian University, Salatiga, Central Java, Indonesia, and also obtained a PhD in Accounting and Finance at the University of Aveiro, Portugal. All of these studies were supported by the Society of Jesus, to which Hanjam has publicly expressed gratitude.

From 2000, Hanjam was a Professor, and later Vice Rector, at the National University of East Timor (Universidade Nasionál Timór Lorosa'e (UNTL)).

== Political career ==
In 2012, Hanjam was under discussion for possible appointment as Secretary of State for Oecusse-Ambeno in the V Constitutional Government under Xanana Gusmão. However, no such appointment was made.

On 3 October 2017, Hanjam was sworn in as Minister of Education and Culture in the VII Constitutional Government. At that time, he was a member of the People's Liberation Party (Tetun: Partidu Libertasaun Popular (PLP)), which was not officially involved in that government; he later switched to Fretilin. His term of office in that Ministry ended on 22 June 2018, when the VIII Constitutional Government was formed.

On 29 May 2020, following a change in the governing coalition, and the admission of Fretilin to the VIII Constitutional Government, Hanjam was sworn in as Minister of Finance. In early October 2020, however, he had to take leave, and on 5 November 2020 he was forced to resign, due to ill health. On 23 November 2020, his immediate predecessor, Rui Gomes, was re-appointed to succeed him.
