= Rui Gomes (politician) =

East Timorese politician

Rui Augusto Gomes
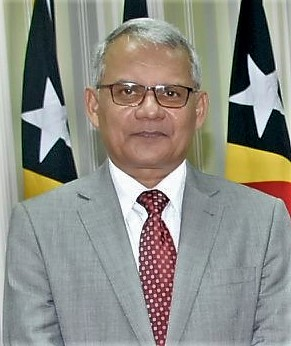
- Gomes in 2020

Minister of Finance
- In office 23 November 2020 – 1 July 2023
- Prime Minister: Taur Matan Ruak
- Preceded by: Fernando Hanjam
- Succeeded by: Santina Viegas Cardoso

Minister for Planning and Finance
- In office 3 October 2017 – 22 June 2018
- Prime Minister: Mari Alkatiri
- Preceded by: Santina Cardoso
- Succeeded by: Fernando Hanjam

Chief of Staff to the President
- In office 11 August 2015 – 20 May 2017
- President: Taur Matan Ruak
- Preceded by: Fidelis Leite Magalhães

Personal details
- Born: 21 September 1958 (age 68): Dili, Portuguese Timor; (now East Timor)
- Party: Independent
- Education: London South Bank University

Rui Augusto Gomes (born 21 September 1958) is an East Timorese politician, administrator and academic. From November 2020 to July 2023, he was the Minister of Finance, serving in the VIII Constitutional Government of East Timor led by Prime Minister Taur Matan Ruak.

Previously, he was Minister for Planning and Finance in the earlier VII Constitutional Government.

He has also worked as an economic adviser and Chief of Staff to the President of East Timor, in various capacities for the United Nations Development Programme (UNDP) and as a university lecturer.

== Early life and career ==
Gomes was born in Dili, Portuguese Timor (now East Timor). He holds a PhD in Development Economics from London South Bank University in the United Kingdom, and has worked and researched for many years in the areas of economic development, poverty reduction and human development.

As of 1998, he was a lecturer at the University of Porto. He has also been the Economic Specialist at the UNDP Resource Center based in Bangkok, and Assistant Country Director of UNDP Timor-Leste.

== Political career ==
On 5 August 2015, Taur Matan Ruak, who was then the President of East Timor, appointed Gomes as his Chief of Staff, replacing Fidelis Leite Magalhães. Previously, Gomes had been a personal advisor to the President on economic issues.

On 15 September 2017, Gomes was sworn in as Minister for Planning and Finance in the VII Constitutional Government led by Mari Alkatiri. His term of office ended on 22 June 2018 when the VIII Constitutional Government took over; he then reverted being an economic adviser, this time to President Francisco Guterres "Lu-Olo", who had taken up that office in 2017.

On 18 June 2020, Gomes was entrusted with the role of President of the Commission for the Preparation of the Economic Recovery Plan for East Timor following the COVID-19 pandemic.

The commission's responsibility was to recommend to the VIII Constitutional Government the measures to be adopted and the actions to be taken for the recovery of East Timor's national economy. Under Gomes's leadership, the commission developed a plan focusing on the promotion of human capital, agriculture, tourism, housing, education, health and social protection.

On 23 November 2020, Gomes was re-appointed Minister of Finance to succeed his own successor Fernando Hanjam, who had had to resign due to ill health.

Gomes' tenure as Minister ended when the IX Constitutional Government took office on 1 July 2023. He was succeeded by Santina Viegas Cardoso.

== Publications ==
- Pembangunan or kolonialisme?: Administering development in East Timor, (Perth: MA dissertation, Murdoch University, 1997)
- Some thoughts for alternative development assistance to East Timor, (Lisbon: Paper for the Eighth Christian Consultation on East Timor, 13–14 September 1997)
