= Santina Cardoso =

East Timorese politician (born 1975)

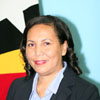

Minister of Finance
- Incumbent
- Assumed office 1 July 2023
- Prime Minister: Xanana Gusmão
- Preceded by: Rui Gomes
- In office 16 February 2015 – 15 September 2017
- Prime Minister: Rui Maria de Araújo
- Preceded by: Emília Pires
- Succeeded by: Rui Augusto Gomes

Vice Minister of Finance
- In office 8 August 2012 – 16 February 2015
- Prime Minister: Xanana Gusmão
- Preceded by: Rui Manuel Hajam
- Succeeded by: Hélder Lopes

Personal details
- Born: 24 November 1975 (age 50)

Santina José Rodrigues Ferreira Viegas Cardoso (born 24 November 1975) is an East Timorese politician and public administrator. She has served as the Minister for Finance since 2023 under Prime Minister Xanana Gusmão and previously served in the position from 2015 and 2017 under the VI Constitutional Government of East Timor led by Rui Maria de Araújo. Previously, between 2012 and 2015, she was the Vice Minister for Finance under the V Constitutional Government led by Xanana Gusmão.

== Early life and career ==
Cardoso graduated in October 2000 from the Widya Mandira Catholic University in Kupang, Indonesia, with a degree in Economics specialising in Economic Sciences and Development Study. Immediately afterwards, she joined the Children Recovery and Resilience Program, a non-government organization for Timorese children.

In 2001, Cardoso started working at the Constituent Assembly of East Timor in its Working Secretariat. At the end of that year, she entered the East Timor Public Administration (ETPA). When the I Constitutional Government of East Timor took office in 2002, Cardoso moved to the National Directorate for Planning and External Assistance Coordination (NDPEAC) of then Ministry of Planning and Finance (MPF), as Programme Officer in the Planning & Monitoring Division. Upon the formation of the IV Constitutional Government in 2007, she was appointed Program Implementation Officer (PIO) of the Planning and Financial Management Capacity Building Project (PFMCBP).

The PFMCBP was a 5-year multi-donor funded PFM project implemented by the Ministry of Finance and supervised by the World Bank. As PIO, Cardoso oversaw the implementation of the project. Subsequently, she was appointed Director-General for Corporate Services in the Ministry of Finance.

== Political career ==
On 8 August 2012, Cardoso was sworn in as Vice Minister of Finance in the V Constitutional Government. When that Constitutional Government was replaced by the VI Constitutional Government on 16 February 2015, she was promoted to the role of Minister of Finance. She vacated her Ministerial position on 15 September 2017, when the VII Constitutional Government took office. In June 2023, she was again appointed minister of finance under Prime Minister Xanana Gusmão.
