= VII Constitutional Government of Timor-Leste =

East Timorese cabinet led by Mari Alkatiri

VII Constitutional Government
- VII Constitutional Government of Timor-Leste

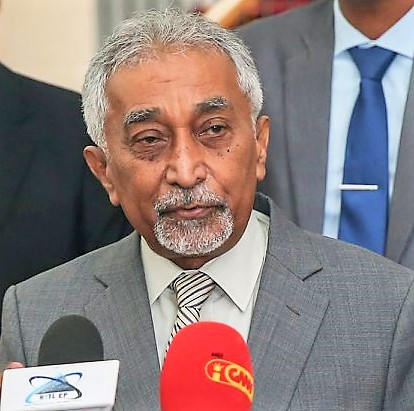
- Prime Minister Mari Alkatiri
- Date formed: 15 September 2017
- Date dissolved: 22 June 2018

People and organisations
- President: Francisco Guterres
- Prime Minister: Mari Alkatiri
- No. of ministers: 1 Prime Minister; 15 other Ministers; 2 Deputy Ministers of the Prime Minister; 13 Vice Ministers; 6 Secretaries of State
- Member parties: Fretilin–PD
- Status in legislature: Minority

History
- Election: 2017
- Predecessor: VI Constitutional Government
- Successor: VIII Constitutional Government

The VII Constitutional Government (Portuguese: VII Governo Constitucional, Tetum: VII Governu Konstitusionál) was the seventh Constitutional Government (administration or cabinet) under the Constitution of Timor-Leste. Formed on 15 September 2017, it was led by the country's second Prime Minister, Mari Alkatiri, and was replaced by the VIII Constitutional Government on 22 June 2018.

== Composition ==
The government was made up of Ministers, Deputy Ministers of the Prime Minister, Vice Ministers and Secretaries of State, as follows:

=== Ministers ===
Party	Minister	Portrait	Portfolio
Fretilin	Mari Alkatiri		Prime Minister; Minister for Development and Institutional Reform
Independent	José Ramos-Horta		Minister of State and Counselor for National Security
Fretilin	Rui Maria de Araújo		Minister of State and Minister of Health
Fretilin	Estanislau da Conceição Aleixo Maria da Silva		Minister of State and Minister for Agriculture and Fisheries
PD	Mariano Assanami Sabino		Minister of State and Minister for Mineral Resources
PD	Adriano do Nascimento		Minister in the Presidency of the Council of Ministers
CNRT	Hermenegildo Ágio Pereira		Deputy Minister of the Prime Minister for the Delimitation of Borders
Fretilin	José Reis		Deputy Minister of the Prime Minister for Governance Affairs
Fretilin	Aurélio Sérgio Cristóvão Guterres		Minister for Foreign Affairs and Cooperation
Fretilin	Valentim Ximenes		Minister of State Administration
Independent	Rui Augusto Gomes		Minister for Planning and Finance
PLP	Fernando Hanjam		Minister of Education and Culture
Fretilin	Hernâni Filomena Coelho da Silva		Minister of Petroleum
UDT	Maria Ângela Guterres Viegas Carrascalão		Minister of Justice
PD	António da Conceição		Minister for Commerce and Industry
Fretilin	Agostinho Sequeira Somotxo		Minister for Defence and Security
Fretilin	Florentina da Conceição Pereira Martins Smith		Minister of Social Solidarity
Independent	Manuel Florêncio da Canossa Vong		Minister for Tourism

=== Vice Ministers ===
Party	Vice Minister	Portrait	Portfolio
Fretilin	Luís Maria Ribeiro Freitas Lobato		Vice Minister of Health
Fretilin	Deolindo da Silva		Vice Minister of Agriculture and Fisheries
Independent	Mariano Renato Monteiro da Cruz		Vice Minister for Development of Public Works
Fretilin	Abrão Gabriel Santos Oliveira		Vice Minister for Development of Housing, Planning and Environment
Fretilin	Inácio Freitas Moreira		Vice Minister for Development of Transport and Communications
Fretilin	Adaljiza Albertina Xavier Reis Magno		Vice Minister of Foreign Affairs and Cooperation
PD	José Anuno		Vice Minister of State Administration
CNRT	Sara Lobo Brites		Vice Minister of Planning and Finance
PLP	José António de Jesus das Neves		Vice Minister of Education and Culture
PD	Lurdes Maria Bessa		Vice Minister for Education and Culture
CNRT	Sebastião Dias Ximenes		Vice Minister of Justice
CNRT	Jacinto Gusmão		Vice Minister of Commerce and Industry
PD	Rui Menezes da Costa		Vice Minister of Tourism

=== Secretaries of State ===
Party	Secretary of State	Portrait	Portfolio
Fretilin	Matias Freitas Boavida		Secretary of State of the Council of Ministers and of Social Communication
Fretilin	Osório Florindo da Conceição Costa		Secretary of State for Sport and Promotion of Top-Level Sport
PD	Nívio Leite Magalhães		Secretary of State for Youth and Labour
Independent	Laura Menezes Lopes		Secretary of State for Gender Equality and Social Inclusion
PLP	André da Costa Belo		Secretary of State for Veterans
PLP	Cipriano Esteves Doutel Ferreira		Secretary of State of Agriculture and Fisheries
