= VI Constitutional Government of Timor-Leste =

East Timorese cabinet led by Rui Maria de Araújo

VI Constitutional Government
- VI Constitutional Government of Timor-Leste

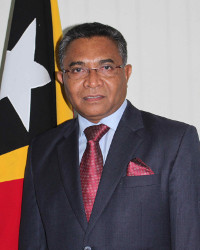
- Prime Minister Rui Maria de Araújo
- Date formed: 16 February 2015
- Date dissolved: 15 September 2017

People and organisations
- Presidents: Taur Matan Ruak; (16 February 2015 – 20 May 2017); Francisco Guterres; (20 May 2017 – 15 September 2017)
- Prime Minister: Rui Maria de Araújo
- No. of ministers: 1 Prime Minister; 16 other Ministers; 11 Vice Ministers; 9 Secretaries of State
- Member parties: National unity government
- Status in legislature: National unity

History
- Election: 2012
- Predecessor: V Constitutional Government
- Successor: VII Constitutional Government

The VI Constitutional Government (Portuguese: VI Governo Constitucional, Tetum: VI Governu Konstitusionál) was the sixth Constitutional Government (administration or cabinet) under the Constitution of Timor-Leste. Formed on 16 February 2015, it was led by the country's sixth Prime Minister, Rui Maria de Araújo, and was replaced by the VII Constitutional Government on 15 September 2017.

== Composition ==
The government was made up of Ministers, Vice Ministers and Secretaries of State, as follows:

=== Ministers ===
Party	Minister	Portrait	Portfolio
Fretilin	Rui Maria de Araújo		Prime Minister
CNRT	Ágio Pereira		Minister of State and of the Presidency of the Council of Ministers
PD	Fernando La Sama de Araújo		Minister of State, Coordinator of Social Affairs and Minister of Education (16 February 2015 – 2 June 2015)
Fretilin	Estanislau da Silva		Minister of State, Coordinator of Economic Affairs and Minister of Agriculture and Fisheries
CNRT	Dionísio Babo Soares		Minister of State, Coordinator of State Administration Affairs and Justice and Minister of State Administration
Fretilin	Hernâni Coelho		Minister of Foreign Affairs and Cooperation
	Santina Cardoso		Minister of Finance
CNRT	Ivo Valente		Minister of Justice
CNRT	Maria do Céu Sarmento Pina da Costa		Minister of Health
	Isabel Amaral Guterres		Minister of Social Solidarity
PD (to 2016)	António da Conceição		Minister of Commerce, Industry and Environment (16 February 2015 – 10 August 2015); Minister of State, Coordinator of Social Affairs and Minister of Education (10 August 2015 – 15 September 2017)
PD (to 2016)	Constâncio da Conceição Pinto		Minister of Commerce, Industry and Environment (10 August 2015 – 15 September 2017)
CNRT	Francisco Kalbuadi Lay		Minister of Tourism, Arts and Culture
PD (to 2016)	Gastão Francisco de Sousa		Minister of Public Works, Transport and Communications
CNRT	Alfredo Pires		Minister of Petroleum and Mineral Resources
CNRT	Cirilo Cristóvão		Minister of Defence
Independent	Longuinhos Monteiro		Minister of the Interior
CNRT	Xanana Gusmão		Minister of Planning and Strategic Investment

=== Vice Ministers ===
Party	Vice Minister	Portrait	Portfolio
CNRT	Dulce de Jesus Soares		Vice Minister of Education I
FM	Abel da Costa Ximenes		Vice Minister of Education II
PD (to 2016)	Marcos da Cruz		Vice Minister of Agriculture and Fisheries
CNRT	Tomás do Rosário Cabral		Vice Minister of State Administration
Independent	Roberto Sarmento de Oliveira Soares		Vice Minister of Foreign Affairs and Cooperation
Independent	Hélder Lopes		Vice Minister of Finance
Independent	Ana Isabel Soares		Vice Minister of Health
CNRT	Miguel Marques Manetelu		Vice Minister of Social Solidarity
PD (to 2016)	Constâncio da Conceição Pinto		Vice Minister of Commerce, Industry and Environment (16 February 2015 – 10 August 2015)
PD (to 2016)	Filipus Nino Pereira		Vice Minister of Commerce, Industry and Environment (10 August 2015 – 15 September 2017)
CNRT	Januário da Costa Pereira		Vice Minister of Public Works, Transport and Communications I
Fretilin	Inácio Moreira		Vice Minister of Public Works, Transport and Communications II

=== Secretaries of State ===
Party	Secretary of State	Portrait	Portfolio
PST	Avelino Maria Coelho da Silva		Secretary of State of the Council of Ministers
CNRT	Maria Terezinha Viegas		Secretary of State for Parliamentary Affairs
CNRT	Nélio Isaac Sarmento		Secretary of State for Social Communication
CNRT	Veneranda Lemos Martins		Secretary of State for the Support and Socio-Economical Promotion of Women
Independent	Leovigildo Hornay		Secretary of State of Youth and Sports
CNRT	Ilídio Ximenes da Costa		Secretary of State for Employment Policy and Vocational Training
PD (to 2016)	Samuel Mendonça		Secretary of State for State Administration
CNRT	Jaime Xavier Lopes		Secretary of State for Land and Property
CNRT	Maria Isabel Ximenes		Secretary of State for Arts and Culture
