= V Constitutional Government of Timor-Leste =

East Timorese cabinet led by Xanana Gusmão

V Constitutional Government
- V Constitutional Government of Timor-Leste

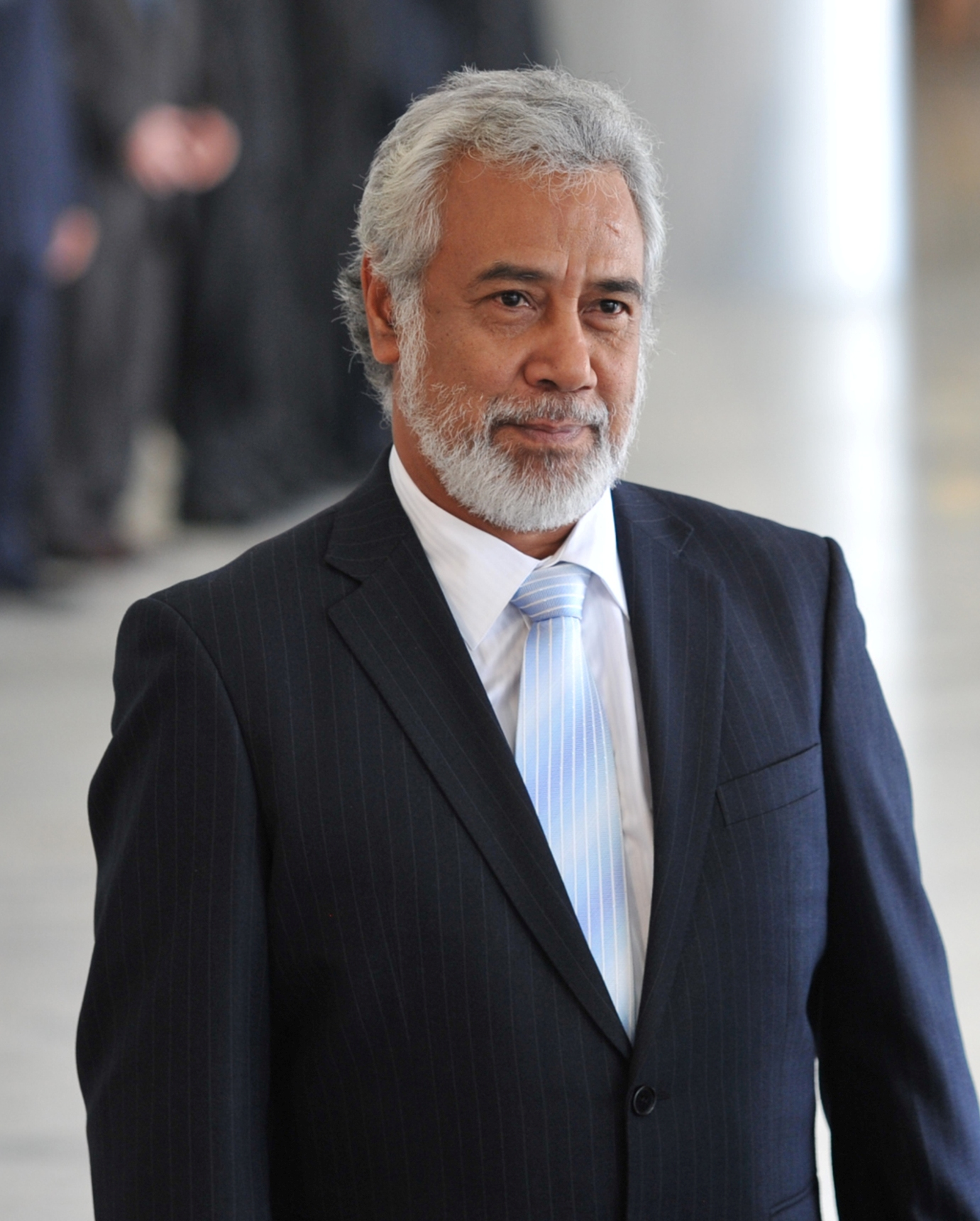
- Prime Minister Xanana Gusmão
- Date formed: 8 August 2012
- Date dissolved: 16 February 2015

People and organisations
- President: Taur Matan Ruak
- Prime Minister: Xanana Gusmão
- No. of ministers: 1 Prime Minister; 15 other Ministers; 12 Vice Ministers; 26 Secretaries of State
- Member parties: CNRT–PD–FM
- Status in legislature: Majority

History
- Election: 2012
- Predecessor: IV Constitutional Government
- Successor: VI Constitutional Government

The V Constitutional Government (Portuguese: V Governo Constitucional, Tetun: V Governu Konstitusionál) was the fifth Constitutional Government (administration or cabinet) under the Constitution of Timor-Leste. Formed on 8 August 2012, it was led by the country's fifth Prime Minister, Xanana Gusmão, and was replaced by the VI Constitutional Government on 16 February 2015.

== Composition ==
The government was made up of Ministers, Vice Ministers and Secretaries of State, as follows:

=== Ministers ===
Party	Minister	Portrait	Portfolio
CNRT	Xanana Gusmão		Prime Minister; Minister for Defence and Security
PD	Fernando La Sama de Araújo		Vice Prime Minister and Coordinator of Social Affairs
CNRT	Ágio Pereira		Minister of State and of the Presidency of the Council of Ministers
FM	José Luís Guterres		Minister of State and of Foreign Affairs and Cooperation
Independent	Emília Pires		Minister of Finance
CNRT	Dionísio Babo Soares		Minister of Justice
CNRT	Sérgio Lobo		Minister of Health
CNRT	Bendito Freitas		Minister of Education
FM	Jorge Teme		Minister of State Administration
PD	António da Conceição		Minister of Commerce, Industry and Environment
Independent	Isabel Guterres		Minister of Social Solidarity
PD	Gastão Francisco de Sousa		Minister of Public Works
Independent	Pedro Lay		Minister of Transport and Communications
PD	Mariano Assanami Sabino		Minister of Agriculture and Fisheries
CNRT	Francisco Kalbuadi Lay		Minister of Tourism
CNRT	Alfredo Pires		Minister of Petroleum and Mineral Resources

=== Vice Ministers ===
Party	Vice Minister	Portrait	Portfolio
PD	Constâncio da Conceição Pinto		Vice Minister of Foreign Affairs and Cooperation
	Santina Cardoso		Vice Minister of Finance
CNRT	Ivo Jorge Valente		Vice Minister of Justice
CNRT	Natália de Araújo		Vice Minister for Ethics and Service Delivery
CNRT	Maria do Céu Sarmento		Vice Minister for Management, Support and Resources
CNRT	Dulce de Jesus Soares		Vice Minister of Basic/Primary Education
CNRT	Virgílio Simith		Vice Minister of Secondary Education
CNRT	Marçal Avelino Ximenes		Vice Minister of Higher Education
FM	Abel da Costa Ximenes		Vice Minister of Commerce, Industry and Environment
CNRT	Jacinto Rigoberto de Deus		Vice Minister of Social Solidarity
CNRT	Flávio Cardoso Neves		Vice Minister for Transport and Communications
PD	Marcos da Cruz		Vice Minister of Agriculture and Fisheries

=== Secretaries of State ===
Party	Secretary of State	Portrait	Portfolio
PST	Avelino Coelho		Secretary of State of the Council of Ministers
CNRT	Maria Terezinha Viegas		Secretary of State for Parliamentary Affairs
CNRT	Nélio Isaac Sarmento		Secretary of State for Media
PD	Francisco Soares		Secretary of State for Institutional Strengthening
CNRT	Veneranda Lemos Martins		Secretary of State for Support and Promotion of the Private Sector
CNRT	Idelta Maria Rodrigues		Secretary of State for the Promotion of Equality
CNRT	Miguel Manetelo		Secretary of State of Youth and Sports
CNRT	Ilídio Ximenes da Costa		Secretary of State for Professional Training and Employment Policy
Independent	Roberto Soares		Secretary of State for ASEAN Affairs
CNRT	Júlio Tomás Pinto		Secretary of State for Defence
CNRT	Francisco Guterres		Secretary of State for Security
CNRT	Jaime Xavier Lopes		Secretary of State for Land and Property
PD	Samuel Mendonça		Secretary of State for Local Development
CNRT	Tomás Cabral		Secretary of State for Administrative Decentralization
FM	Ricardo Cardoso Nheu		Secretary of State of Commerce
PD	Filipus ‘Nino’ Pereira		Secretary of State of Industry and Cooperatives
PD	Nominando Soares Martins ‘Buras’		Secretary of State of Environment
FM	Vítor da Costa		Secretary of State for Social Security
PD	Júlio Sarmento da Costa		Secretary of State for the Combatants for National Liberation Affairs
CNRT	Luís Vaz Rodrigues		Secretary of State for Public Works
CNRT	Januário Pereira		Secretary of State for Electricity
PD	Elias Pereira Moniz		Secretary of State for Water, Sanitation and Urban Development
PD	João Fernandes		Secretary of State for Forestry and Nature Conservation
CNRT	Rafael Pereira Gonçalves		Secretary of State for Fisheries
CNRT	Valentino Varela		Secretary of State for Livestock
CNRT	Maria Isabel de Jesus Ximenes		Secretary of State for Art and Culture
