= IV Constitutional Government of Timor-Leste =

East Timorese cabinet led by Xanana Gusmão

IV Constitutional Government
- IV Constitutional Government of Timor-Leste

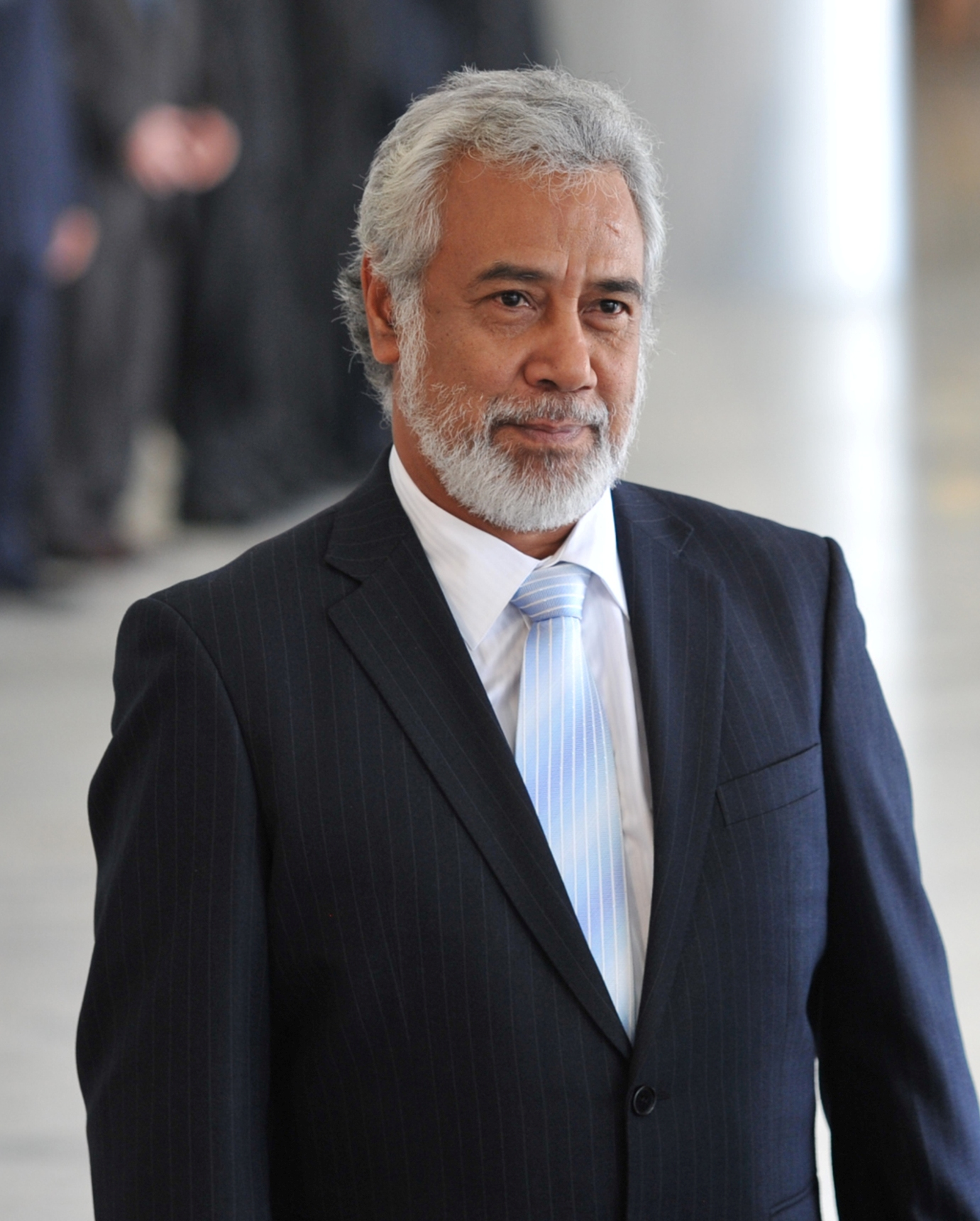
- Prime Minister Xanana Gusmão
- Date formed: 8 August 2007
- Date dissolved: 8 August 2012

People and organisations
- President: José Ramos-Horta; (8 August 2007 – 20 May 2012); Taur Matan Ruak; (20 May 2012 – 8 August 2012)
- Prime Minister: Xanana Gusmão
- No. of ministers: 1 Prime Minister; 12–13 other Ministers; 5 Vice Ministers; 20 Secretaries of State
- Member parties: Parliamentary Majority Alliance (AMP)
- Status in legislature: Majority

History
- Election: 2007
- Predecessor: III Constitutional Government
- Successor: V Constitutional Government

The IV Constitutional Government (Portuguese: IV Governo Constitucional, Tetum: IV Governu Konstitusionál) was the fourth Constitutional Government (administration or cabinet) under the Constitution of Timor-Leste. Formed on 8 August 2007, it was led by the country's fifth Prime Minister, Xanana Gusmão, and was replaced by the V Constitutional Government on 8 August 2012.

== Composition ==
The government was made up of Ministers, Vice Ministers and Secretaries of State, as follows:

=== Ministers ===
Party	Minister	Portrait	Portfolio
CNRT	Xanana Gusmão		Prime Minister; Minister of Defence
FM	José Luís Guterres		Vice Prime Minister for Social Affairs
PSD	Mário Viegas Carrascalão		Vice Prime Minister for Management and State Administration (5 March 2009 – 8 September 2010)
PSD	Zacarias da Costa		Minister of Foreign Affairs and Cooperation
Independent	Emília Pires		Minister of Finance
PSD	Lúcia Lobato		Minister of Justice (suspended March 2012)
Independent	Nélson Martins		Minister of Health
Independent	João Câncio Freitas		Minister of Education
PD	Arcângelo Leite		Minister of State Administration and Territorial Planning
PSD	João Gonçalves		Minister of Economy and Development
Independent	Maria Domingas Alves		Minister of Social Solidarity
Independent	Pedro Lay		Minister of Infrastructure
ASDT	Gil Alves		Minister of Tourism, Commerce and Industry
PD	Mariano Assanami Sabino		Minister of Agriculture and Fisheries

=== Vice Ministers ===
Party	Vice Minister	Portrait	Portfolio
PD	Rui Manuel Hanjam		Vice Minister of Finance
	Madalena Hanjam		Vice Minister of Health
PD	Paulo Assis Belo		Vice Minister of Education
UNDERTIM	Cristiano da Costa		Vice Minister of Economy and Development
ASDT	José Manuel Carrascalão		Vice Minister of Infrastructure

=== Secretaries of State ===
Party	Secretary of State	Portrait	Portfolio
CNRT	Ágio Pereira		Secretary of State of the Council of Ministers
CNRT	Júlio Tomás Pinto		Secretary of State of Defence
Independent	Francisco Guterres		Secretary of State for Security
CNRT	Miguel Manetelo		Secretary of State for Youth and Sports
CNRT	Alfredo Pires		Secretary of State for Natural Resources
PST	Avelino Coelho		Secretary of State for Energy Policy
CNRT	Bendito Freitas		Secretary of State for Professional Training and Employment
CNRT	Idelta Maria Rodrigues		Secretary of State for the Promotion of Equality
CNRT	Virgílio Simith		Secretary of State for Culture
FM	Jorge Teme		Secretary of State for the Region of Oecusse
PD	Florindo Pereira		Secretary of State for Administrative Reform
ASDT	Abílio de Jesus Lima		Secretary of State for Environment
PD	Mário Nicolau dos Reis		Secretary of State for Former National Liberation Combatants Affairs
CNRT	Jacinto Gomes de Deus		Secretary of State for Social Assistance and Natural Disasters
CNRT	Vitor da Costa		Secretary of State for Social Security
PD	Domingos Caeiro		Secretary of State for Public Works
CNRT	Januário Pereira		Secretary of State for Electricity, Water and Urbanization
PD	Marcos da Cruz		Secretary of State for Agriculture and Arboriculture
PD	Eduardo de Carvalho		Secretary of State for Fisheries (died 8 February 2010)
CNRT	Valentino Varela		Secretary of State for Livestock
