= Madalena Boavida =

East Timorese politician

Maria Madalena Brites Boavida is an East Timorese politician, a member of FRETILIN, and a former Minister of Planning and Finance in the National Parliament of East Timor.

== Biography ==
Boavida comes from the present municipality of Ermera. Thanks to a scholarship in 1974, she was given the opportunity to study in Portugal. There she came into contact with students from the African colonies of Portugal and the local independence movements, after which she also supported the independence of Portuguese Timor. However, FRETILIN's unilateral declaration of independence from Portugal in November 1975 was rapidly followed by the Indonesian invasion of East Timor. Boavida belonged to the so-called Maputo group of FRETILIN members, including Marí Alkatiri (later prime minister), which spent much of the occupation (1975-1999) in Mozambique.

Boavida was the finance director of the Timor Gap Authority, which administered the Timor Gap Treaty, under which Indonesia and Australia jointly exploited the oil and gas fields in the disputed maritime area known as the Timor Gap.

Following the resignation of Fernanda Borges, Boavida became the Timor-Leste Minister of Finance on 30 April 2002, while the country was still under the administration of the United Nations. From 20 May 2002, when Timor-Leste became independent, she became Minister of Planning and Finance, and held that office until 8 August 2007, when FRETILIN had to relinquish government after losing its absolute majority in the 2007 parliamentary elections. The next Minister of Finance was Emília Pires.

In 2013, Boavida was appointed a non-executive member of the Council of the Central Bank of East Timor. She was re-appointed in 2016.
