= Florentina Martins Smith =

East Timorese politician

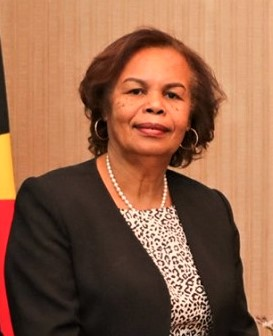
- Martins Smith in 2019

Minister of Social Solidarity
- In office 15 September 2017 – 22 June 2018
- Prime Minister: Mari Alkatiri
- Preceded by: Isabel Amaral Guterres
- Succeeded by: Armanda Berta dos Santos

Member of the National Parliament
- In office 2012–2017

Personal details
- Born: 9 September 1958 (age 67) Dili, Portuguese Timor (now East Timor)

Florentina da Conceição Pereira Martins Smith (born 9 September 1958) is an East Timorese politician, and a member of the Fretilin political party. Between September 2017 and June 2018, she was the Minister for Social Solidarity under the VII Constitutional Government of East Timor led by Mari Alkatiri. Previously, between 2012 and 2017, she was a member of the National Parliament of East Timor.

== Early life and career ==
Martins Smith has a degree in Economics and Management. Prior to commencing her political career, she was the Inspector General of the Ministry of Tourism, Trade and Industry. She was also General Secretary of the Organização Popular de Mulheres Timorense OPMT, the women's division of Fretilin.

== Political career ==
In the 2012 East Timorese parliamentary election, Martins Smith was elected to the National Parliament from 12th place on the Fretilin list. In the National Parliament, she was a member of the Public Finance Committee (Committee C).

In 2017, Martins Smith was re-elected to the National Parliament, once again from 12th place on the Fretilin list. However, on 15 September 2017 she was sworn in as Minister of Social Solidarity in the VII Constitutional Government, and therefore had to give up her seat in accordance with the Constitution. She left that office on 22 June 2018, upon the formation of the VIII Constitutional Government.
