= António Duarte Carvarino =

East Timorese politician

António Duarte Carvarino (died February 1979) was an East Timorese politician. He was a member of the a Fretilin independence movement.

== Life and work ==
Carvarino was of mixed Timor-African descent. He was the second Prime Minister of Timor Leste, holding the position from 1977 to 1979. He was arrested and killed by Indonesians in Manatuto.
