= Maria Terezinha Viegas =

East Timorese worker in agriculture and politician

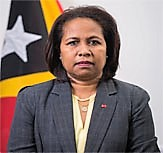
- Born: October 3, 1964 (age 61); Laclubar
- Occupation: Politician
- Known for: Secretary of State for Parliamentary Affairs
- Political party: National Congress for Timorese Reconstruction
- Spouse: Antonio Joao Gomes da Costa
- Children: 3

Maria Terezinha Viegas (born October 3, 1964) was an East Timorese worker in agriculture who became a politician in the National Congress for Timorese Reconstruction party. From 2012 to 2017 she was Secretary of State for Parliamentary Affairs and she was re-elected in 2018.

== Life ==
Viegas was born in Laclubar on 3 October 1964. She gained a degree in Agronomy.

In the 1990s she was working in Dili and in her spare time secretly supporting the revolutionaries of East Timor. She was one of the supporters sending letters and supplies. She met Antonio Joao Gomes da Costa who was a rebel leader who went by the nom de guerre of Mahuno but there relationship was soon interrupted by his arrest in April 1993. He was still in custody three years later when they married in Dare.

She worked for the revolution but in 1999 her husband had a stroke and she had to spend time assisting his recovery. In 2001 she was one of thirteen women chosen to serve on the National Council of the East Timor Transitional Administration (ETTA).

From 2012 to 2017 Viegas was Secretary of State for Parliamentary Affairs. In 2017, Viegas was a delegate to the national group of the national parliament at the parliamentary assembly of the Community of Portuguese Language Countries (CPLP).

In the 2018 East Timorese parliamentary election she was elected again and then made Secretary of the Presidium of the Parliament.

In 2018 Viegas was elected to the Executive Committee of the East Timor Football Federation.

== Private life ==
She married Antonio Joao Gomes da Costa and they had three children.
