= Sara Lobo Brites =

East Timorese politician

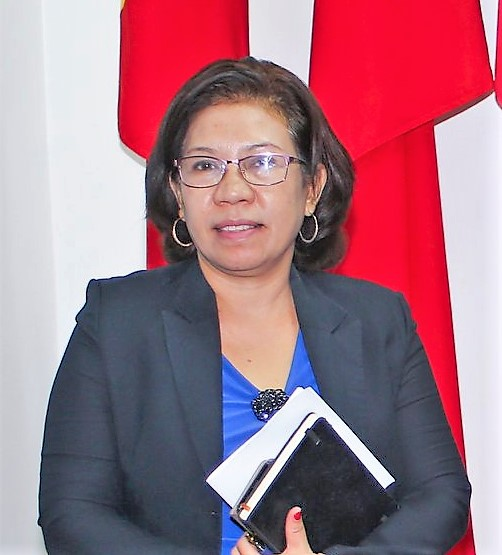
Lobo Brites in 2019

Sara Lobo Brites is an East Timorese politician. She was Deputy Minister of Finance in the VIII Constitutional Government of East Timor. She had earlier been a vice-governor of the Central Bank of Timor Leste for five years.
