= Emília Pires =

East Timorese politician

Emilia Pires
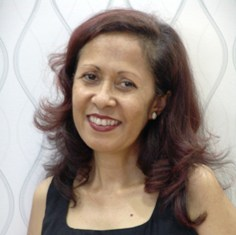
- Pires in 2010

East Timor Minister of Finance
- In office 7 April 2007 – 16 February 2015
- President: Taur Matan Ruak
- Prime Minister: Xanana Gusmão
- Preceded by: Madalena Boavida
- Succeeded by: Santina Cardoso

Personal details
- Born: Rairobo, East Timor
- Education: La Trobe University; University of Melbourne; London School of Economics

Emília Pires was East Timor's Minister of Finance from April 2007 until 16 February 2015. Ms. Pires was sworn in as the Minister of Finance of the V Constitutional Government of East Timor on August 8, 2012 under the leadership of Prime Minister Xanana Gusmão.

In July 2012, Pires was appointed by the Secretary-General of United Nations, Ban Ki-moon, to the 26-member High-level Panel of Eminent Persons advising the United Nations on the post 2015 global development agenda.

== Early life ==
In 1975, as a teenager, Emilia Pires left East Timor (then Portuguese Timor) for Australia as a refugee, with her parents, brothers and sisters. At the time, she and her family believed they would be able to return after only a few days. However, exile lasted for 24 years before Pires was able to return to East Timor.

Pires began her professional career as a junior public servant in the Victorian Government in her early 20s. She then rose to senior management level.

Before becoming Minister of Finance, Ms. Pires held senior positions with:

- World Bank, Senior Aid Management Specialist in West Bank and Gaza, where she advised both the Ministries of Finance and Planning of the Palestinian Authority and donors on aid coordination to the economic sector
- United Nations, UNMISET’s Senior Advisor to the East Timor Ministry of Planning and Finance
- UNTAET’s Head of the Planning Commission Secretariat as well as the Chief of the National Development and Planning Agency (NPDA), and
- Chief of the National Development and Planning Agency (NPDA).

== Minister of Finance ==
Some of Pires' main achievements are:

- Timor-Leste Transparency Portal was launched in early 2011, enabling the public to search, evaluate and analyse State expenditures in real time. The reforms helped lead to the reduction by 19 countries of the Transparency International’s Corruption Perception Index
- Emilia Pires was selected to be the first Chair of the g7+, the first forum of its kind giving fragile and conflict-affected countries a voice and place to share issues and ideas. Pires held the role until May 2014, when Minister Kaifala Marah of Sierra Leone took over.
- Until June 2014, Pires co-chaired the International Dialogue of Peacebuilding and Statebuilding with Denmark and later with Finland, and

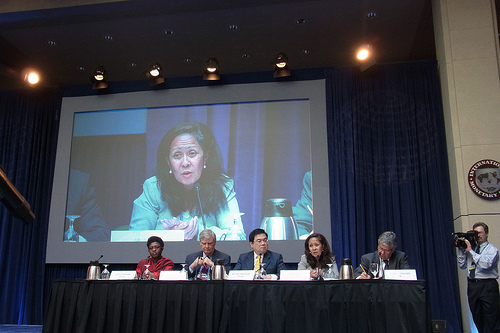
Emilia Pires addresses an audience at the Statebuilding, Equity and the Political Economy of Tax Reform panel discussion, 2011 World Bank-IMF Spring Meetings

- To improve service delivery, Pires corporatised the Ministry of Finance increasing decentralisation of some functions to line Ministries, like parts of the procurement process.

Emilia Pires led the planning process for the first Timorese National Development Plan and East Timor’s Vision 2020, as well as chairing the UNDP Working Group to produce the first East Timor National Human Development Report.

== Appointment to United Nations High-level Panel of Eminent Persons ==
In July 2012, Pires was appointed by the Secretary-General of United Nations, Ban Ki-moon, to the 26-member High-level Panel of Eminent Persons advising the United Nations on the Post-2015 Development Agenda.

The co-chairs of the Panel are the President of the Republic of Indonesia, Susilo Bambang Yudhoyono, the President of the Republic of Liberia, Ellen Johnson-Sirleaf and the Prime Minister of the United Kingdom, David Cameron.

== Publications ==
- Co-authored "How will the Macroeconomy be Managed in an Independent East Timor? An East Timorese view" with East Timor President of the Republic, H.E. Jose Ramos-Horta in 2001, published in the IMF’s Finance and Development Magazine.
- Co-authored "National Ownership and International Trusteeship: the Case of Timor-Leste", with Mr. Michael Francino in 2007, published in Boyce James K. and Madalene O’Donnell (eds) in the Peace and the Public Purse: Economic Policies for Postwar Statebuilding.

== Education ==
Her educational qualifications include

- a bachelor's degree majoring in Mathematics (Statistics) from La Trobe University
- post graduate studies in Government Law from the University of Melbourne, and
- a Masters of Science in Development Management from the London School of Economics and Political Science in the UK.

== Keynotes ==
Pires has also been invited to act as Keynote Speaker at various high-level forums:

- the Senior Level Forum on Development Effectiveness in Fragile States in London organized by DFID, OECD, World Bank, UNDP and European Union
- the "Deepening Voice and Accountability to fight poverty" Dialogue sponsored by the Communication Implementers in Paris
- the 3rd High-Level Forum on Aid Effectiveness held in Accra, Ghana where she co-chaired the session on "New Development Challenges and New Development Partnerships: the Relevance and Urgency of Aid Reform"
