= Prime Minister of Timor-Leste =

Head of government

Prime Minister of the Democratic Republic of Timor-Leste
- Primeiro-Ministro (Portuguese); Primeiru-Ministru (Tetun)
- Coat of arms of Timor-Leste

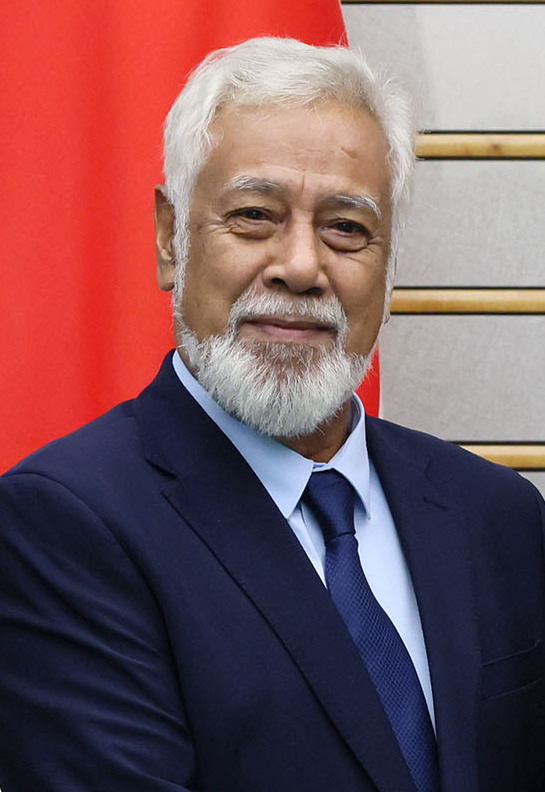
- Incumbent; Xanana Gusmão since 1 July 2023
- Style: His Excellency
- Status: Head of Government
- Residence: Government Palace
- Seat: Dili
- Appointer: President of Timor-Leste
- Term length: Five years
- Constituting instrument: Constitution of Timor-Leste
- Formation: 28 November 1975; 20 May 2002
- First holder: Nicolau dos Reis Lobato; Mari Alkatiri
- Deputy: Deputy Prime Minister
- Salary: US$27,000 annually

The prime minister of Timor-Leste, officially the Prime Minister of the Democratic Republic of Timor Leste (Portuguese: Primeiro-Ministro da República Democrática de Timor-Leste; Tetun: Primeiru-Ministru Republika Demokratika Timor-Leste) is the head of government of the Democratic Republic of Timor-Leste.

The president of Timor-Leste is the head of state. The president appoints the prime minister, after parliamentary elections and have listened to all parties represented in the National Parliament, who is usually the leader of the majority party or majority coalition. The prime minister is ex officio a member of the Council of State, chairs the cabinet and oversees the activities of the government.

The current prime minister is Xanana Gusmão, who was sworn in on 1 July 2023; he also served as the 6th prime minister from 2007 to 2015.

== List of prime ministers of Timor-Leste ==
Political parties

Fretilin
National Congress for Timorese Reconstruction (CNRT)
People's Liberation Party (PLP)

Other factions

Independent

=== Prime ministers of East Timor during the War for Independence ===
No.	Portrait	Name (Birth–Death)	Term of office			Political party	Government	Ref.
No.	Portrait	Name (Birth–Death)	Took office	Left office	Time in office	Political party	Government	Ref.
1		Nicolau dos Reis Lobato (1946–1978)	28 November 1975	7 December 1975	9 days	Fretilin	Council of Ministers	
2		António Duarte Carvarino (?–1979)	October 1977	February 1979	1 year, 4 months	Fretilin		

=== Chief ministers during United Nations administration ===
No.	Portrait	Name (Birth–Death)	Term of office			Political party	Elected	Government	Ref.
No.	Portrait	Name (Birth–Death)	Took office	Left office	Time in office	Political party	Elected	Government	Ref.
–		Mari Alkatiri (born 1949)	20 September 2001	20 May 2002	212 days	Fretilin	2001	Transitional Government	

=== Prime ministers of the Democratic Republic of Timor-Leste ===
No.	Portrait	Name (Birth–Death)	Term of office			Political party	Elected	Government	Ref.
No.	Portrait	Name (Birth–Death)	Took office	Left office	Time in office	Political party	Elected	Government	Ref.
3		Mari Alkatiri (born 1949)	20 May 2002	26 June 2006 (Note: Resigned during the 2006 crisis.)	4 years, 37 days	Fretilin	—	I Government	
–		José Ramos-Horta (born 1949)	26 June 2006	10 July 2006	14 days	Independent	—	I Government	
4		José Ramos-Horta (born 1949)	10 July 2006	19 May 2007	313 days	Independent	—	II Government	
5		Estanislau da Silva (born 1952)	19 May 2007	8 August 2007	81 days	Fretilin	—	III Government	
6		Xanana Gusmão (born 1946)	8 August 2007	16 February 2015	7 years, 192 days	CNRT	2007	IV Government	
6		Xanana Gusmão (born 1946)	8 August 2007	16 February 2015	7 years, 192 days	CNRT	2012	V Government	
7		Rui Maria de Araújo (born 1964)	16 February 2015	15 September 2017	2 years, 211 days	Fretilin	—	VI Government	
8		Mari Alkatiri (born 1949)	15 September 2017	22 June 2018	280 days	Fretilin	2017	VII Government	
9		Taur Matan Ruak (born 1956)	22 June 2018	1 July 2023	5 years, 9 days	PLP	2018	VIII Government	
10		Xanana Gusmão (born 1946)	1 July 2023	Incumbent	3 years, 140 days	CNRT	2023	IX Government	

== List of deputy prime ministers of Timor-Leste ==
The Constitution of Timor-Leste provides, in sections 104 and 105, for the appointment of officials referred to in its English language version as "Deputy Ministers". In other English language publications, those officials are commonly referred to as "Vice Ministers", even though the word "Vice", in context, arguably has a different meaning in English from the word "Deputy". In this article, the constitutional expression "Deputy" is used.

No.	Portrait	Name (Birth–Death)	Term of office			Political party	Elected	Government	Ref.
No.	Portrait	Name (Birth–Death)	Took office	Left office	Time in office	Political party	Elected	Government	Ref.
1		Armanda Berta dos Santos (born 1974)	29 May 2020	1 July 2023	3 years, 33 days	KHUNTO	—	VIII Government	
2		José Maria dos Reis (born 1956)	24 June 2020	1 July 2023	3 years, 7 days	Fretilin	—	VIII Government	
3		Francisco Kalbuadi Lay (born 1954)	1 July 2023	Incumbent	3 years, 140 days	CNRT	2023	IX Government	
4		Mariano Assanami Lopes (born 1975)	1 July 2023	Incumbent	3 years, 140 days	PD	2023	IX Government	

== See also ==
- Politics of Timor-Leste
- History of Timor-Leste
- List of colonial governors of Portuguese Timor
- President of Timor-Leste
- First Lady of Timor-Leste
