= Ministry of Finance (Timor-Leste) =

Ministry in the government of East Timor

- Ministério das Finanças (Portuguese); Ministeriu Finansas (Tetun)
- Coat of Arms of East Timor

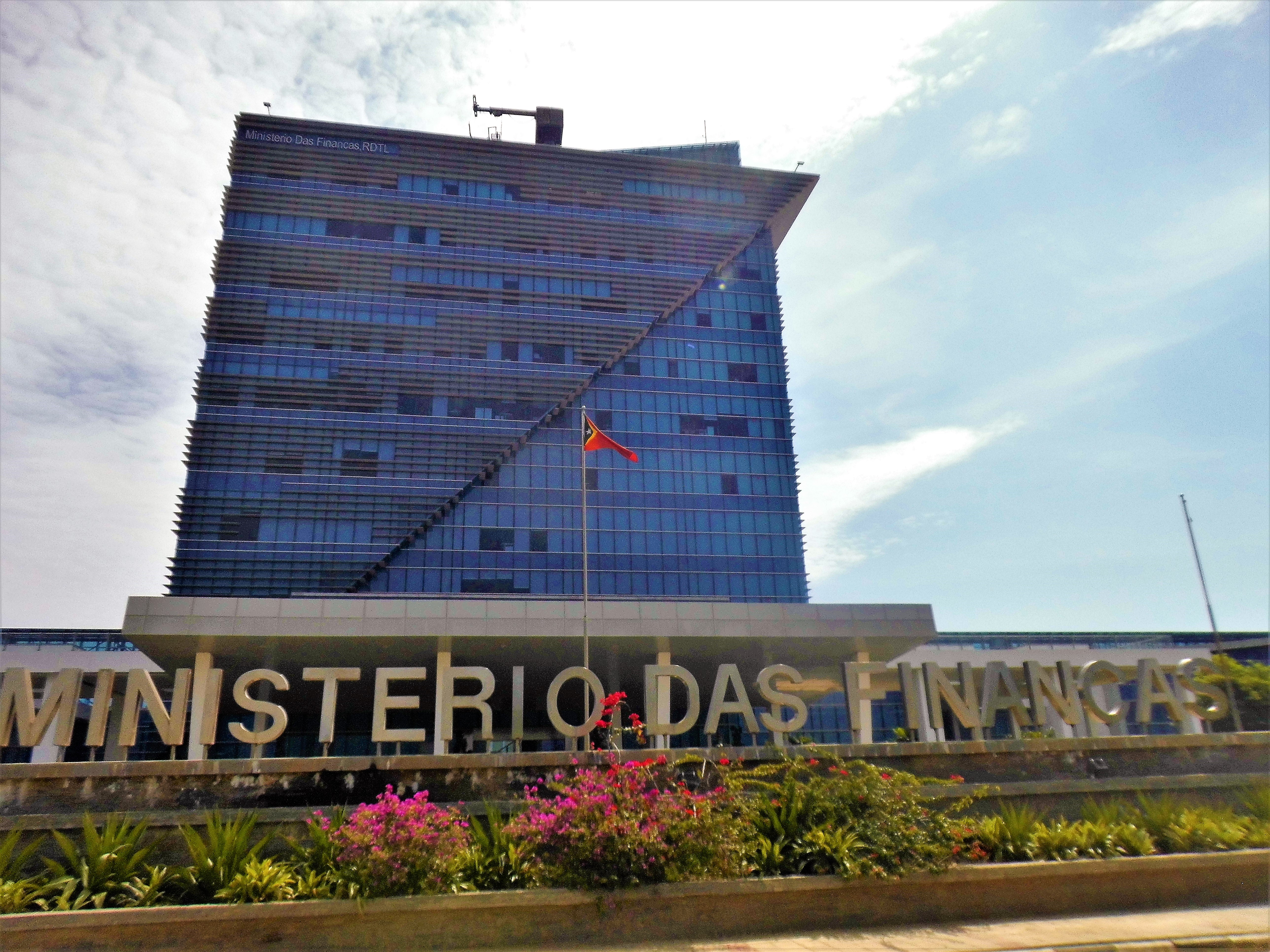
- Headquarters of the Ministry

Ministry overview
- Formed: 1975 / 2002
- Jurisdiction: Government of East Timor
- Headquarters: Aitarak Laran, Dili; 8°33′5″S 125°33′47″E
- Minister responsible: Santina Viegas Cardoso, Minister of Finance
- Website: Ministry of Finance
- Agency ID: MOF
- Ministry logo
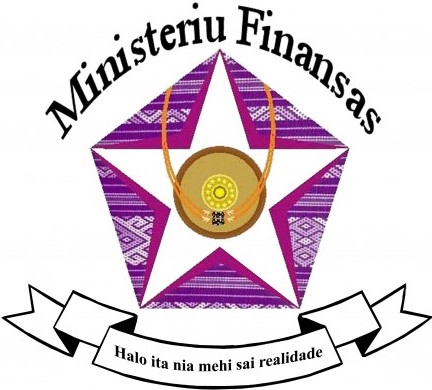

The Timor-Leste Ministry of Finance (MOF; Portuguese: Ministério das Finanças, Tetun: Ministeriu Finansas) is the government department of East Timor accountable for the government budget and public finances.

== Functions ==
The Ministry is responsible for the design, implementation, coordination and evaluation of policy for:

- annual planning; and
- monitoring

of the government budget and public finances.

== Minister ==
The incumbent Minister of Finance is Santina Viegas Cardoso.

== See also ==
- List of finance ministries
- Politics of East Timor
