= Rui Maria de Araújo =

Prime minister of East Timor

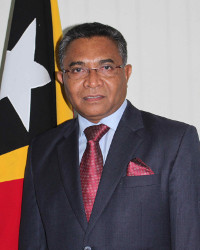
- Araújo in 2015

7th Prime Minister of East Timor
- In office 16 February 2015 – 15 September 2017
- President: Taur Matan Ruak; Francisco Guterres
- Preceded by: Xanana Gusmão
- Succeeded by: Mari Alkatiri

Minister of Health
- In office 15 September 2017 – 22 June 2018
- Prime Minister: Mari Alkatiri
- In office 20 September 2001 – 8 August 2007

Personal details
- Born: 21 May 1964 (age 62) Zumalai, Cova Lima Municipality, Portuguese Timor
- Party: Fretilin
- Spouse: Teresa António Madeira Soares
- Children: 2
- Education: Udayana University; University of Otago; Satya Wacana Christian University; Sultan Agung Islamic University

Rui Maria de Araújo (born 21 May 1964) is an East Timorese politician who served as prime minister from 2015 to 2017. He was Minister of Health from 2001 to 2006 and Deputy Prime Minister from 2006 to 2007.

== Early life ==
Rui Maria de Araújo was born in Zumalai, Cova Lima Municipality, on 21 May 1964. His education was interrupted by the Indonesian invasion of East Timor in 1975. His familytook refugee in Suai, Bobonaro, and Ainaro, which were controlled by Fretilin. They surrendered to Indonesian soldiers in 1978.

Araújo completed his secondary education in Dili. The school he attended in Dili was the only one in occupied-East Timor that taught in Portuguese. He was given a scholarship to study English literature at Satya Wacana Christian University in 1985, but chose to study medicine instead. He enrolled at the Medical School of Sultan Agung University in 1986. He did training in otolaryngology (ear nose throat speciality and head and neck surgery) at the Medical Faculty of Udayana University in Bali, Indonesia. He has a Masters in Public Health from his studies at Otago University in New Zealand. He had also studied English literature at Satya Wacana Christian University in Salatiga, Indonesia for one year before shifting to medicine.

== Career ==
From 1990 to 1992, Araújo was a special liaison in Bali for Falintil. He helped a team from Yorkshire Television film the documentary In Cold Blood: The Massacre of East Timor in 1991. Araújo joined Fretilin in 2010, and became a member of its central committee in 2011.

Araújo served as Minister of Health in the government of Prime Minister Mari Alkatiri.

Prime Minister Xanana Gusmão resigned on 6 February 2015, and appointed Araújo to succeed him. Araújo formed a national unity government on 16 February 2015. Araújo said that he was prime minister as an individual and not as a member of Fretilin.

== Personal life ==
Araújo is married to Teresa António Madeira Soares and is the father of two children.

== Works cited ==
=== Journals ===
- Nygaard-Christensen, Maj (2016). "Timor-Leste In 2015: Petro-Politics or Sustainable Growth?". Southeast Asian Affairs. ISEAS – Yusof Ishak Institute: 347–360. doi:10.2307/26466935. JSTOR 26466935.
- Shoesmith, Dennis (2017). "Timor-Leste In 2016: Redefining Democracy". Southeast Asian Affairs. ISEAS – Yusof Ishak Institute: 387–404. doi:10.2307/26492620. JSTOR 26492620.

=== Web ===
- "H.E. Dr. Rui Maria de Araújo". Government of Timor-Leste. Archived from the original on 20 November 2026.

Political offices
Preceded by Xanana Gusmão	Prime Minister of East Timor; 2015–2017	Succeeded by Mari Alkatiri
