= Mari Alkatiri =

Prime Minister of Timor-Leste (2002–2006; 2017–2018)

Mari Bin Amude Alkatiri
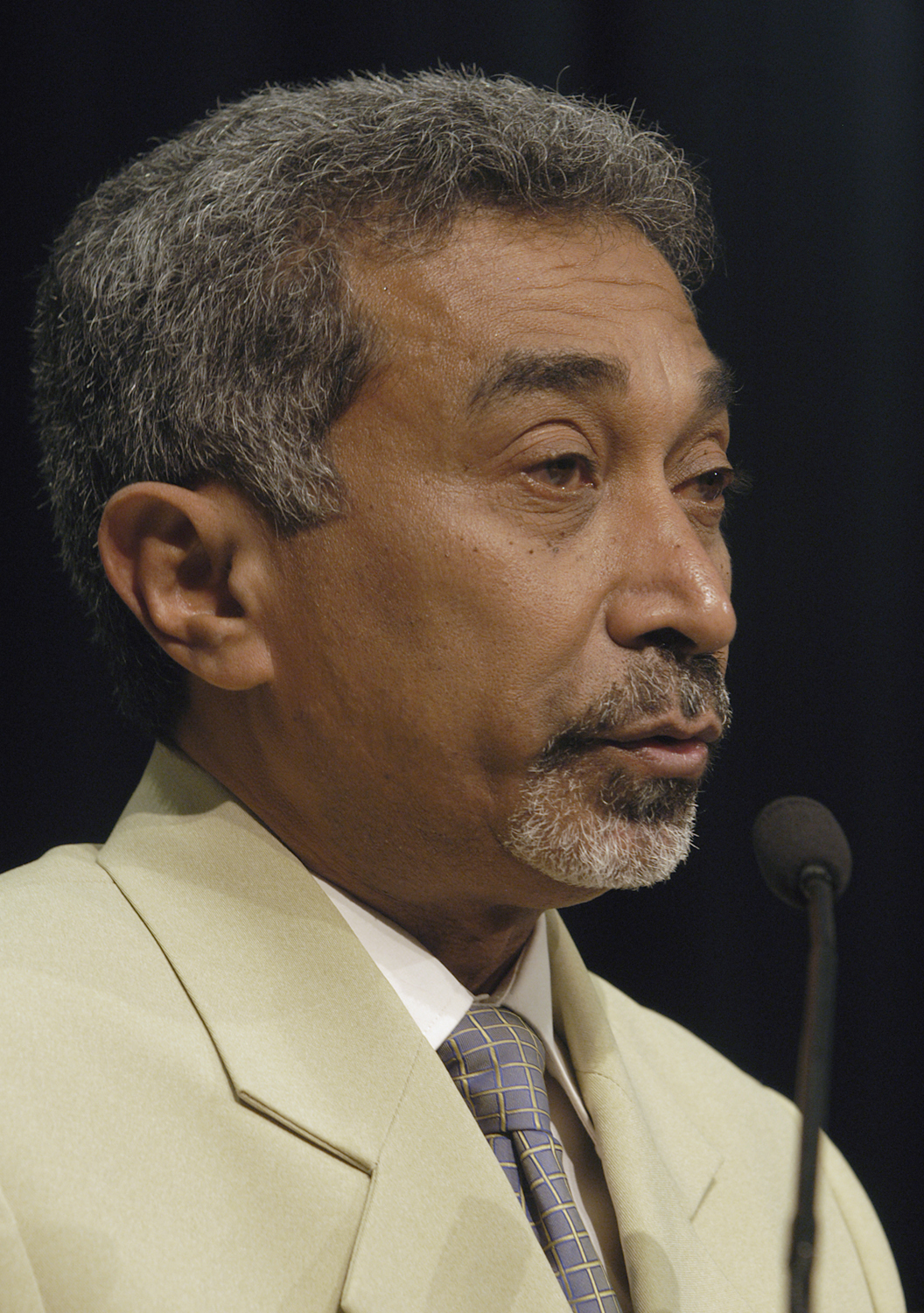
- Alkatiri in 2002

3rd and 8th Prime Minister of East Timor
- In office 15 September 2017 – 22 June 2018
- President: Francisco Guterres
- Preceded by: Rui Maria de Araújo
- Succeeded by: Taur Matan Ruak
- In office 20 May 2002 – 26 June 2006
- President: Xanana Gusmão
- Preceded by: António Duarte Carvarino (1979)
- Succeeded by: José Ramos-Horta

Personal details
- Born: 26 November 1949 (age 76) Dili, Portuguese Timor (now Timor-Leste)
- Party: Fretilin
- Education: Eduardo Mondlane University

Mari bin Amude Alkatiri GCIH (Arabic: مرعي بن عمودة الكثيري, romanised: Marʿī bin ʿAmūdah al-Kathīrī; born 26 November 1949) is a East Timorese politician. He was Prime Minister of Timor-Leste from May 2002 until his resignation on 26 June 2006 following weeks of political unrest in the country, and again from September 2017 until May 2018. He is the Secretary-General of the Fretilin party and was the former President of the Special Administrative Region of Oecusse.

Alkatiri is an Hadhrami Arab by ethnicity and comes from the Al-Kathiri tribe, a branch of which ruled the sultanate of Kathiri in the Hadhramaut, which is now part of Yemen. He is one of very few Muslim politicians in a country that is largely Christian. The main issues facing his second term as prime minister were environmental conservation, cultural conservation, accession of East Timor to the Association of Southeast Asian Nations, free public education and public health services, and building the country's economy, notably the lagging services and manufacturing sectors.

== Biography ==
Alkatiri's ancestors were Hadhrami merchants from the tribe of Al Kathiri who lived in Portuguese Timor; he was born in Dili, and had 10 other siblings. He left East Timor in 1970 for post-secondary studies in Portuguese Angola, returning to East Timor as one of the founders of Fretilin, becoming its Minister for Political Affairs. Following Fretilin's declaration of independence for the Democratic Republic of Timor-Leste on 28 November 1975, Alkatiri was sent overseas as part of a high-level diplomatic mission. After Indonesia invaded the nascent nation on 7 December 1975, Alkatiri and his colleagues were unable to return, and he established the headquarters of the Fretilin External Delegation in Maputo, Mozambique.

During the 24-year Indonesian occupation of East Timor, Alkatiri was a chartered surveyor (Angolan School of Geography), and lived in exile in Angola and Mozambique. He also studied law at Eduardo Mondlane University, in Maputo, Mozambique. Alkatiri was senior Legal consultant in a private law office in Maputo from 1992 to 1998, and a consultant on public international law and constitutional law to the Assembly of the Republic of Mozambique from 1995 to 1998.

On 20 May 2002, the United Nations Transitional Administration transferred sovereignty to the first elected Parliament and Government of East Timor. As Secretary-General of the Fretilin Party, which had received a large majority of the vote in Parliamentary elections the previous August, Alkatiri was chosen as the first Prime Minister of the newly independent nation.

In May 2006, his government faced near-civil war conditions when approximately half of the country's security forces rebelled amidst scenes of rioting and looting in the country's capital, Dili. On 21 June 2006, President Xanana Gusmão called for Alkatiri to resign or else he would, as allegations that Alkatiri had ordered a hit squad to threaten and kill his political opponents led to public backlash. Senior members of the Fretilin party met on 25 June to discuss Alkatiri's future as the prime minister, amidst a protest involving thousands of people calling for Alkatiri to resign instead of Gusmão. The party agreed to keep Alkatiri as prime minister; Foreign and Interim Defence Minister José Ramos-Horta resigned immediately following this decision. On the same day, East Timor's chief of police Paulo Martins called for Alkatiri to be arrested for conspiracy to murder his political opponents.

Despite this vote of confidence, Alkatiri resigned on 26 June 2006, to end the uncertainty. In announcing this he said, "I declare I am ready to resign my position as prime minister of the government… so as to avoid the resignation of His Excellency the President of the Republic Xanana Gusmão."

The 'hit squad' accusations against Alkatiri were subsequently rejected by a UN Commission, which criticised Gusmão for making inflammatory statements during the crisis, and called Police Chief Paulo Martins's abandonment of his post a 'serious dereliction of duty'.

In the June 2007 parliamentary election, Alkatiri was re-elected to a seat in parliament; he was the second name on Fretilin's candidate list, after party president Francisco "Lu Olo" Guterres.

Alkatiri said on 1 August 2007 that he would be Fretilin's candidate for prime minister, while criticising the record of his rival for the position, Gusmão, who had left the presidency and was elected to parliament at the head of a new party, the National Congress for Timorese Reconstruction (CNRT). Fretilin won more seats than any other party in parliament, including the CNRT, but a post-electoral coalition led by Gusmão holds a majority of seats. In a statement, Alkatiri called for a national unity government comprising all parties elected to parliament, saying that this would bring stability. With the parties unable to reach an agreement to form a government together, President José Ramos-Horta announced on 6 August that he had decided that the CNRT-led coalition would form the government, with Gusmão at its head. Alkatiri denounced Ramos-Horta's decision as unconstitutional, and angry Fretilin supporters reacted to Ramos-Horta's announcement with violent protests, although Alkatiri said that the party would fight the decision through legal means and would encourage people to protest and practice civil disobedience. The party subsequently backed away from its threat of legal action.

Later in August, after Australian soldiers took Fretilin flags during protests and allegedly desecrated them, Alkatiri accused the Australians of working against Fretilin and intimidating it, and said that "it would be better for Australian troops to just return home if they cannot be neutral".

In September 2017, Alkatiri was voted again as Timor Leste's prime minister. In the 2018 parliamentary elections, Alkatiri gave up his parliamentary seat and was replaced by Noémia Sequeira.

== Assessment ==
Alkatiri has been described as a skillful negotiator and an economic nationalist who secured as larger portion of East Timor's share of the Timor Sea oil resources against Australia. He was backed by Portugal but opposed by the Australian government of John Howard.

Alkatiri is an Honorary Member of the International Raoul Wallenberg Foundation's Roncalli Committee.

== Honours ==
- Grand-Cross of the Order of Prince Henry, Portugal (February 14, 2016)

Political offices
Vacant Title last held by António Duarte Carvarino	Prime Minister of East Timor; 2002–2006	Succeeded by José Ramos-Horta
Preceded by Rui Maria de Araújo	Prime Minister of East Timor; 2017–2018	Succeeded by Taur Matan Ruak
