= Xanana Gusmão =

Prime Minister of Timor-Leste (2007–2015; since 2023)

His Excellency Xanana Gusmão
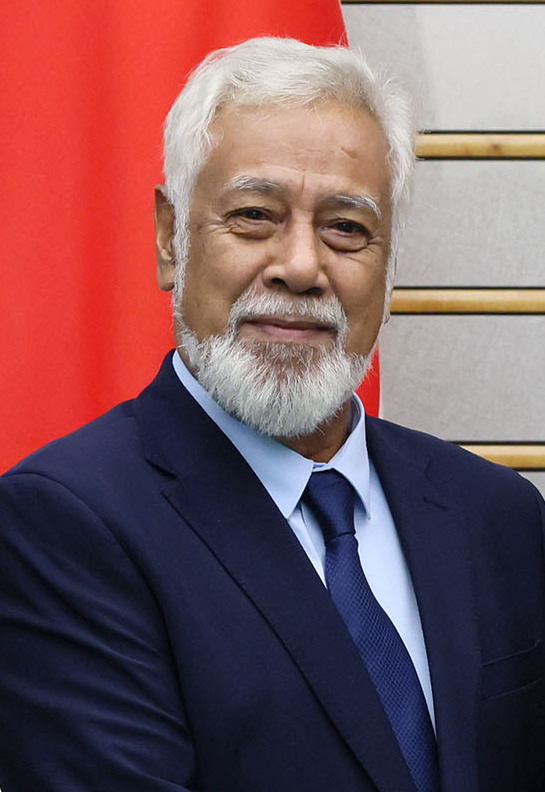
- Gusmão in 2023

11th Prime Minister of Timor-Leste
- Incumbent
- Assumed office 1 July 2023
- President: José Ramos-Horta
- Deputy: Francisco Kalbuadi Lay; Mariano Sabino Lopes
- Preceded by: Taur Matan Ruak
- In office 8 August 2007 – 16 February 2015
- President: José Ramos-Horta; Taur Matan Ruak
- Preceded by: Estanislau da Silva
- Succeeded by: Rui Maria de Araújo

3rd President of Timor-Leste
- In office 20 May 2002 – 20 May 2007
- Prime Minister: Mari Alkatiri; José Ramos-Horta; Estanislau da Silva
- Preceded by: Sérgio Vieira de Mello as UN Administrator (1999–2002); Nicolau dos Reis Lobato as acting president (1975–1978)
- Succeeded by: José Ramos-Horta

Personal details
- Born: José Alexandre Gusmão; 20 June 1946 (age 80) Manatuto, Portuguese Timor
- Party: National Congress for Timorese Reconstruction
- Spouses: Maria Emília Baptista (m. 1965; div. 1999) Kirsty Sword (m. 2000; sep. 2015)
- Children: 5

José Alexandre "Xanana" Gusmão (Portuguese pronunciation: [ʒuˈzɛ ɐlɨˈʃɐ̃dɾɨ ʃɐˈnanɐ ɣuʒˈmɐ̃w]; born 20 June 1946) is an East Timorese politician. He has served as the tenth prime minister of Timor-Leste since 2023, previously serving as the sixth prime minister from 2007 to 2015. A former rebel, he also served as Timor-Leste's first president since its re-establishment of independence from 2002 to 2007.

== Early life and career ==
Gusmão was born in Laleia, Manatuto, in what was then Portuguese Timor, as the second son in a large family. His parents, both of whom were school teachers, were of mixed Portuguese-Timorese ancestry, and his family were assimilados. He attended a Jesuit school in Dare, just outside Dili, and Dili High School. After leaving high-school for financial reasons at the age of 15 in 1961, he held a variety of unskilled jobs, while continuing his education at night school.

In 1965, aged 19, Gusmão met Emilia Batista, who was later to become his wife. His nickname, "Xanana", was taken from the name of the American rock and roll band Sha Na Na (pronounced the same as "Xanana", which is spelled according to Portuguese and Tetum orthography), who in turn were named after a lyric from the doo-wop song "Get a Job" written and recorded in 1957 by the Silhouettes.

In 1966, Gusmão obtained a position with the public service, which allowed him to continue his education. This was interrupted in 1968 when Gusmão was recruited by the Portuguese Army for national service. He served for three years, rising to the rank of corporal. During this time, he married Emilia Batista, with whom he had a son Eugenio, and a daughter Zenilda. He later divorced Emilia, and in 2000, he married Australian Kirsty Sword, with whom he had three sons: Alexandre, Kay Olok and Daniel. In 1971, Gusmão completed his national service, his son was born, and he became involved with a nationalist organisation headed by José Ramos-Horta. For the next three years, he was actively involved in peaceful protests directed at the colonial system.

The 1974 Carnation Revolution in Portugal resulted in the beginning of decolonisation for Portuguese Timor, and shortly afterwards the Governor Mário Lemos Pires announced plans to grant the colony independence. Plans were drawn up to hold general elections with a view to independence in 1978. During most of 1975 a bitter internal struggle occurred between two rival factions in Portuguese Timor. Gusmão became deeply involved with the Fretilin faction, and as a result he was arrested and imprisoned by the rival faction the Timorese Democratic Union (UDT) in mid-1975. Taking advantage of the internal disorder, and with an eye to absorbing the colony, Indonesia immediately began a campaign of destabilisation, and frequent raids into Portuguese Timor were staged from Indonesian West Timor. By late 1975 the Fretilin faction had gained control of Portuguese Timor and Gusmão was released from prison. He was given the position of Press Secretary within the Fretilin organisation. On 28 November 1975, Fretilin declared the independence of Portuguese Timor as "The Democratic Republic of East Timor", and Gusmão was responsible for filming the ceremony. Nine days later, Indonesia invaded East Timor. At the time Gusmão was visiting friends outside of Dili and he witnessed the invasion from the hills. For the next few days he searched for his family.

== Indonesian occupation ==
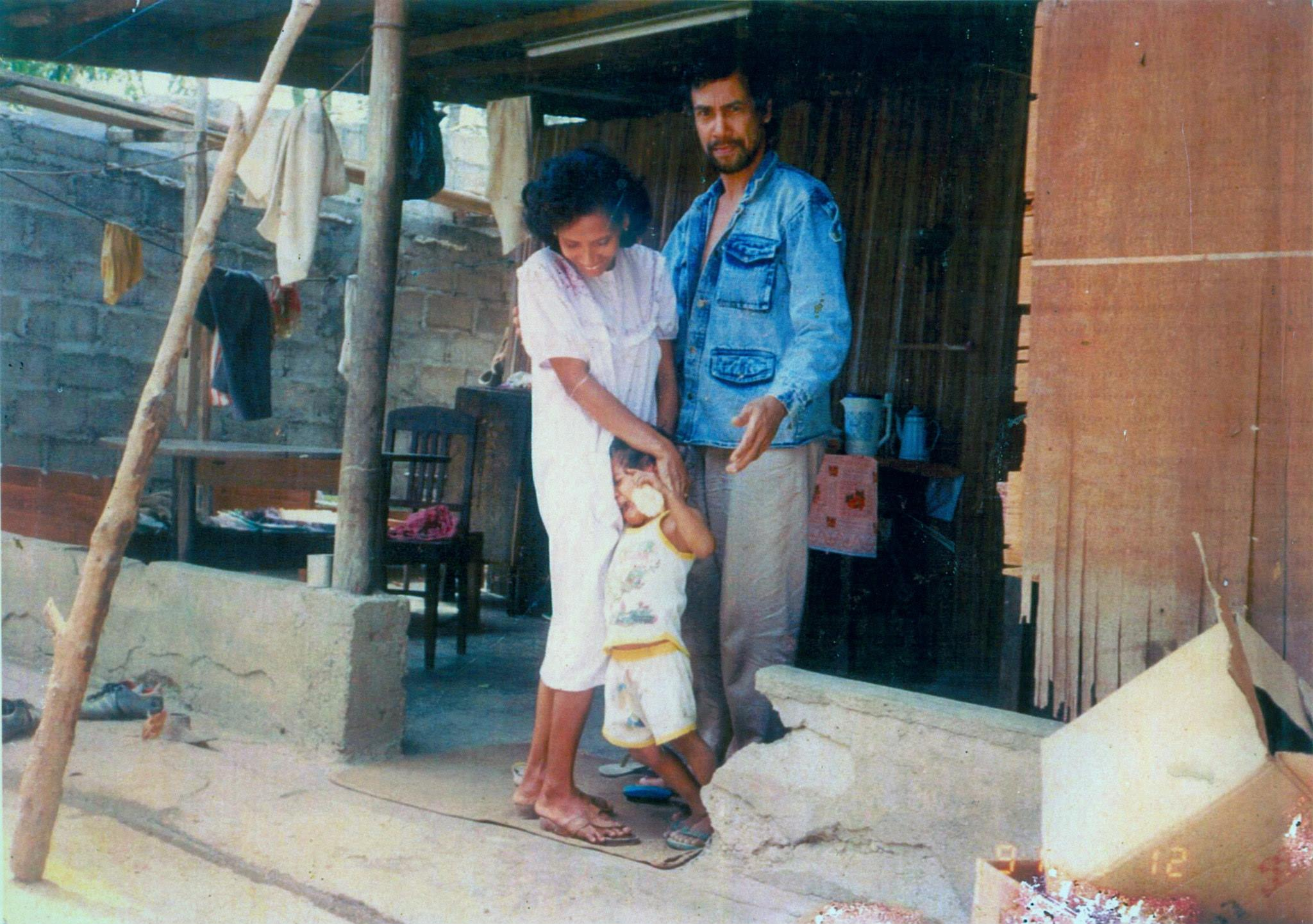
Xanana Gusmão in a safe house in Dili during the occupation

After the appointment of the Provisional Government of East Timor by Indonesia, Gusmão became heavily involved in resistance activities. Gusmão was largely responsible for the level of organisation that evolved in the resistance, which ultimately led to its success. The early days featured Gusmão walking from village to village to obtain support and recruits. In 1977, Gusmão was the aide-de-camp to Fretilin political commissar Abel Larisina and organised supplies for civilians at the resistance base at Matebian. In November 1978, the base was destroyed by the Indonesians. But after Fretilin suffered some major setbacks in the early 1980s, including a failed 1984 coup attempt against Gusmão led by four senior Falintil officers, including Mauk Moruk, Gusmão left Fretilin and supported various centrist coalitions, eventually becoming a leading opponent of Fretilin. In March 1981, a secret national conference in Lacluta elected him head of Falintil, succeeding the slain Nicolau dos Reis Lobatos.

In 1988, Gusmão became leader of the newly formed National Council of Resistance (CNRT). To avoid being seen as partisan, Gusmão left Fretilin for this. Under his leadership, FALINTIL relied more on clandestine underground networks and used small groups to attack Indonesian targets. By the mid-1980s, he was a major leader. During the early 1990s, Gusmão became deeply involved in diplomacy and media management, and was instrumental in alerting the world to the massacre in Dili that occurred in Santa Cruz on 12 November 1991. Gusmão was interviewed by many major media channels and obtained worldwide attention.

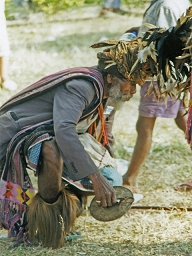
Gusmão's visit to Same (2000)

As a result of his high profile, Gusmão became a prime target of the Indonesian government. Indonesian troops (TNI) attempted to capture Gusmão in the Same and Ainaro area on 14 November 1990 with Operasi Senyum ("Operation Smile"). Four days earlier, a woman had been captured who testified during interrogation that the rebel leader was staying at a nearby mountain. Xanana Gusmão, however, probably escaped one night before the attack. After the attack, in which twelve battalions and four helicopters were deployed, the military claimed to have found about 100 fighters. Also found was a container with Gusmão's documents, a video camera and his typewriter. Among the documents were letters from the Pope and Bishop Carlos Belo. According to a traditional Timorese legend, some warriors were able to transform themselves into dogs to escape their captors. Picking up on this myth, the legend spread that Gusmão could also turn into a white dog and thus run around the village unnoticed while the Indonesian soldiers were looking for him.

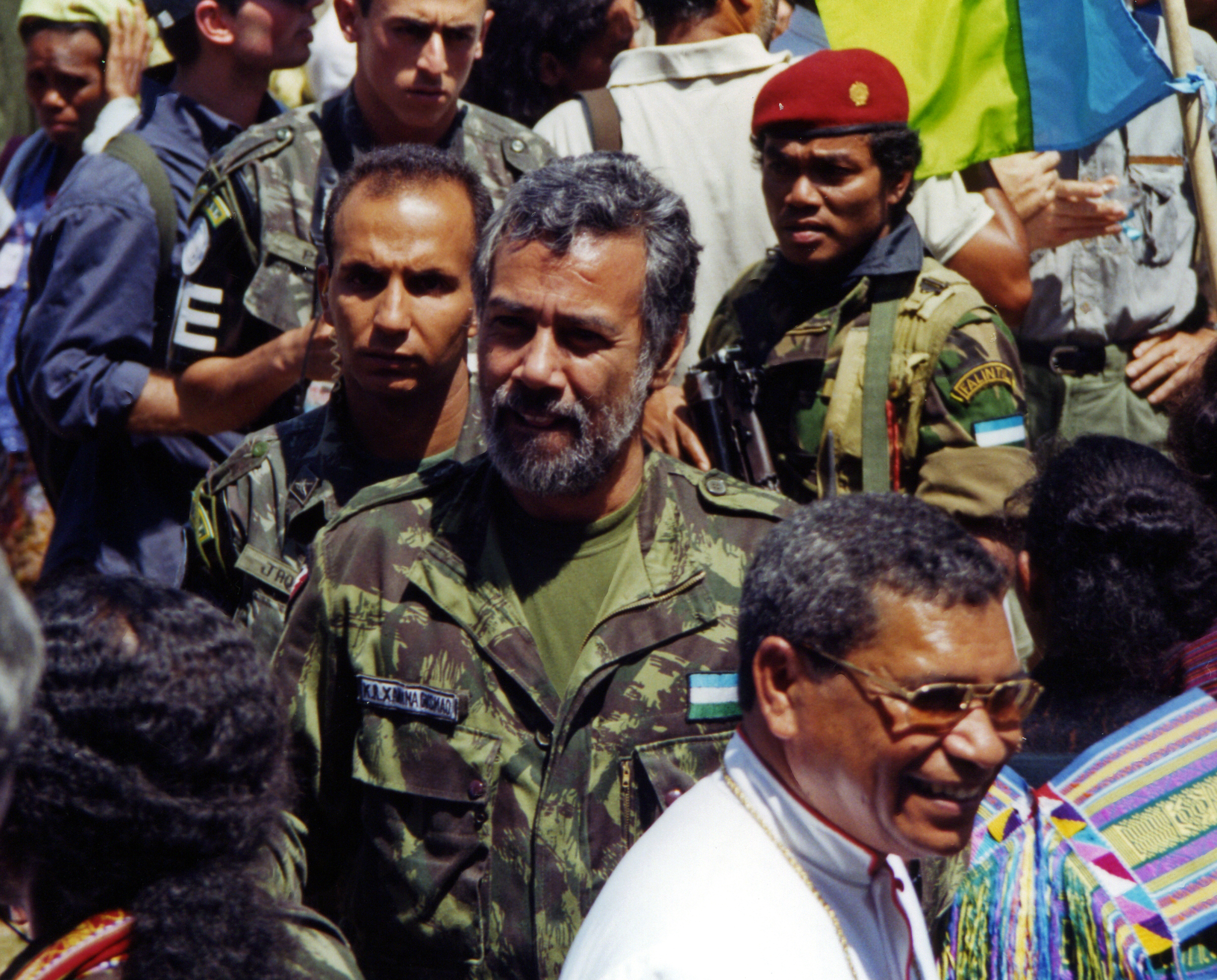
Return of Gusmão to Aileu after Indonesian arrest

In November 1992, a campaign for his capture was finally successful in a large-scale operation by the Indonesian military with Gusmão apprehended in a tunnel under the family home of Aliança Araújo in Lahane near Dili and taken to Bali. In May 1993, Gusmão was tried, convicted and sentenced to life imprisonment by the Indonesian government. He was found guilty under Article 108 of the Indonesian Penal Code (rebellion), Law no. 12 of 1951 (illegal possession of firearms) and Article 106 (attempting to separate part of the territory of Indonesia). He spoke in his own defence and he was appointed with defence lawyers before the commencement of his trial. The sentence was commuted to 20 years by the Indonesian President Suharto in August 1993. He was taken to Jakarta's maximum security prison, Cipinang. Although not released until late 1999, Gusmão successfully led the resistance from within prison with the help of Kirsty Sword. Prior to his release, the United Kingdom offered Gusmão political asylum to ensure his safety. The Xanana Room at the British Embassy in Jakarta commemorates this today. By the time of his release, he was regularly visited by United Nations representatives, and dignitaries such as Nelson Mandela.

== Transition to independence ==
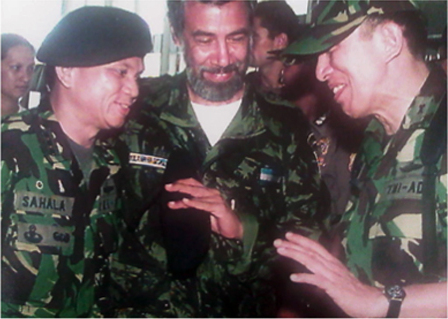
Last meeting on 30 October 1999 between Colonel Czi J. Suryo Prabowo, Xanana, and Col Inf Sahala Silalahi. The next day the TNI's rule in East Timor ended.

On 30 August 1999, a referendum was held in East Timor and an overwhelming majority voted for independence. The Indonesian military commenced a campaign of terror as a result, with terrible consequences. Although the Indonesian government denied ordering this offensive, they were widely condemned for failing to prevent it. As a result of overwhelming diplomatic pressure from the United Nations, promoted by Portugal since the late 1970s and also by the United States and Australia in the 1990s, a UN-sanctioned, Australian-led international peace-keeping force (INTERFET) entered East Timor.

Gusmão was secretly flown into East Timor by INTERFET on Thursday, 21 October 1999, flying from Darwin, Australia, to Baucau, before moving onwards to Dili. His presence in Dili was revealed by loudspeaker trucks announcing he would make a speech. This 25-minute speech urged reconciliation and rebuilding. At this time, Gusmão was 53, and was already expected to become the first President, despite some criticism over his lack of action against the post-referendum terror campaign.

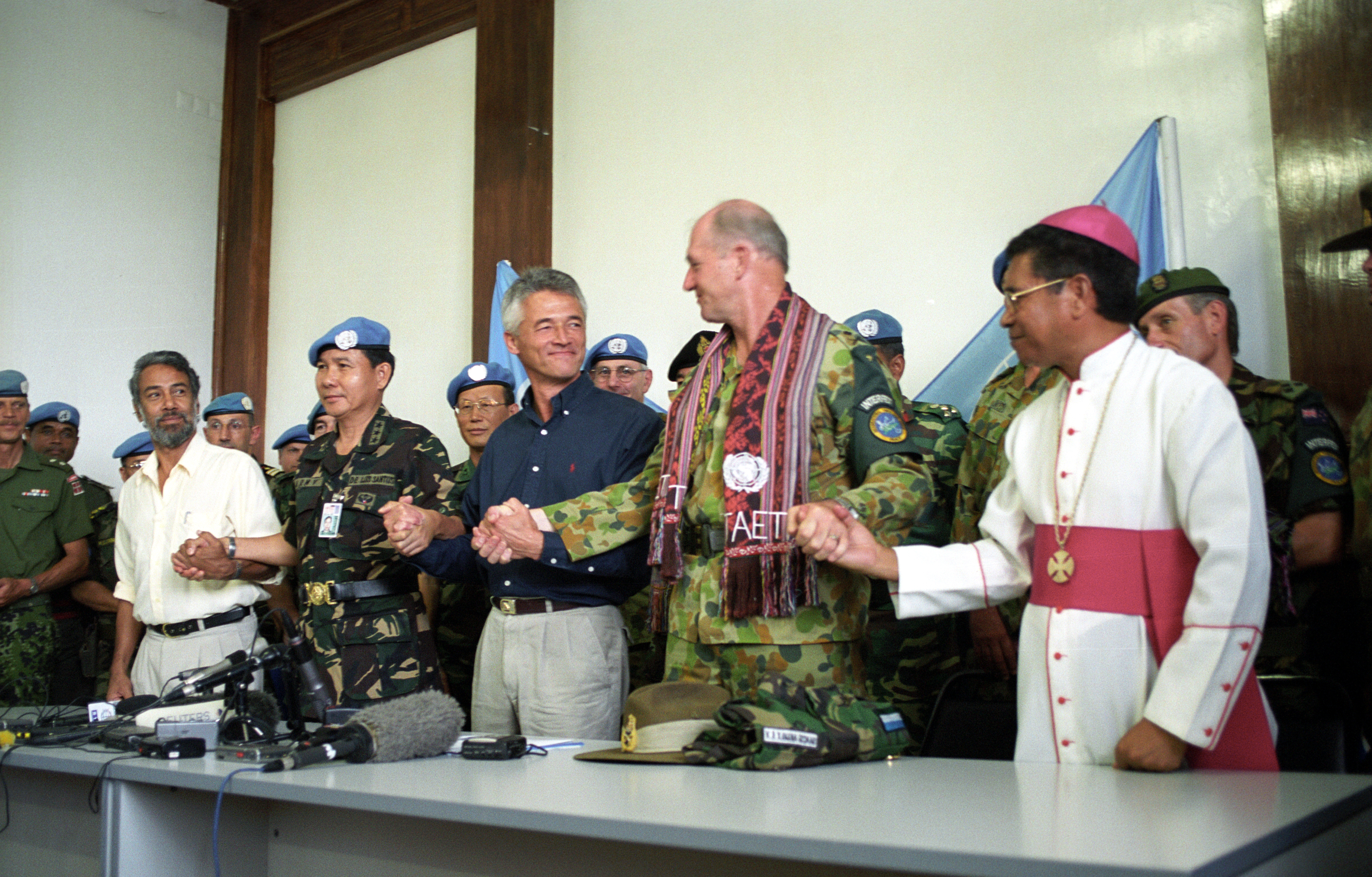
Gusmão handing over control from INTERFET to UNTAET

In 1999, Xanana Gusmão was elected speaker of the National Consultative Council (NCC), a kind of transitional parliament during the UN administration of East Timor. On 23 October 2000, Gusmão also became spokesman for the subsequent National Council (NC). Gusmão was appointed to a senior role in the UN administration that governed East Timor until 20 May 2002. During this time he continually campaigned for unity and peace within East Timor, and was generally regarded as the de facto leader of the emerging nation. Elections were held in late 2001 and Gusmão, endorsed by nine parties but not by Fretilin, ran as an independent and was comfortably elected leader.

Gusmão eventually won the presidential election on 14 April 2002 with 82.7% against his opponent Francisco Xavier do Amaral and the first president of Timor-Leste when it became formally independent on 20 May 2002. Gusmão has published an autobiography with selected writings entitled To Resist Is to Win. He is the main narrator of the film A Hero's Journey/Where the Sun Rises, a 2006 documentary about him and Timor-Leste. According to director Grace Phan, it's an "intimate insight into the personal transformation" of the man who helped shape and liberate Timor-Leste.

== Independent Timor-Leste ==
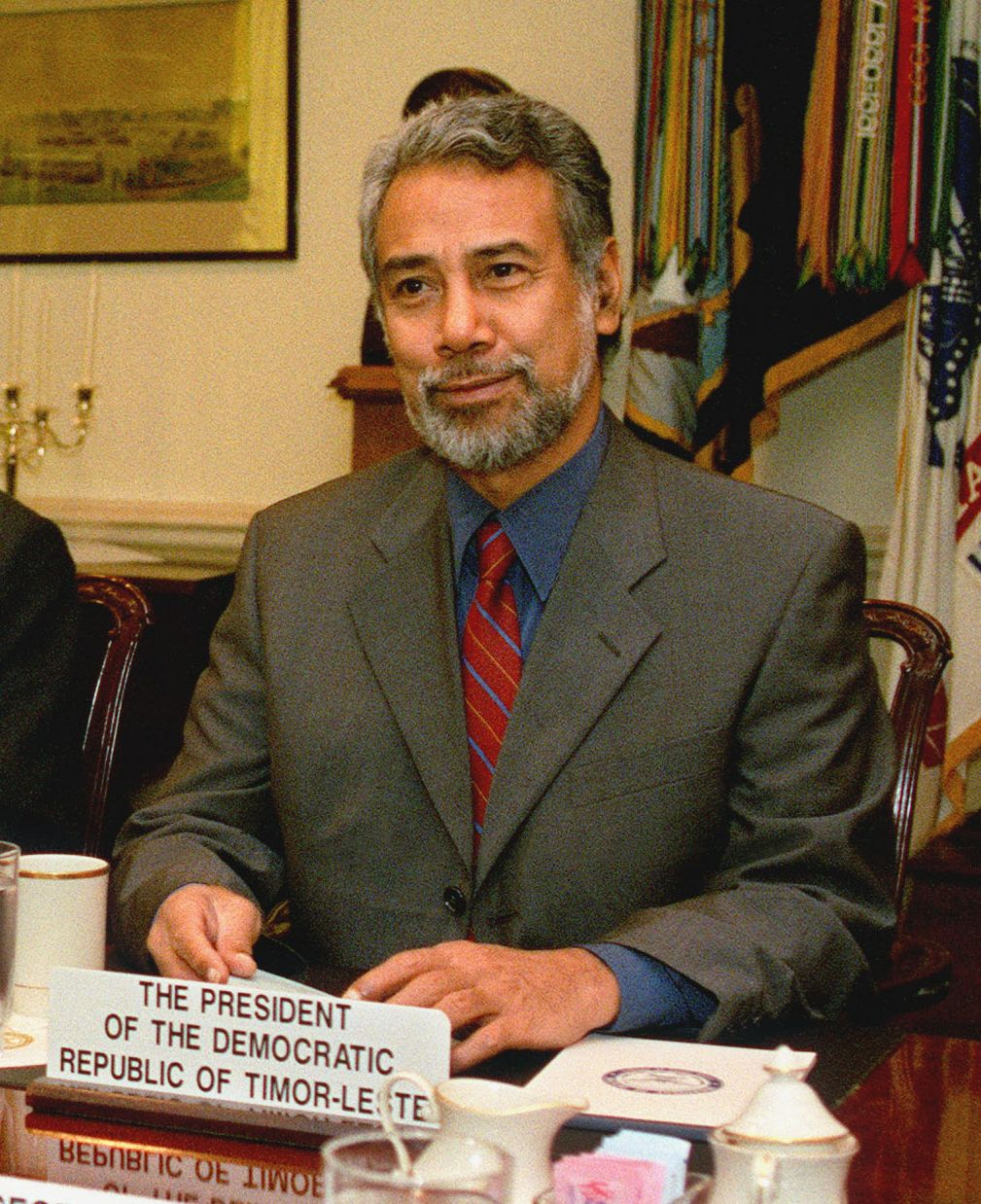
Xanana Gusmão as the president of Timor-Leste

On 21 June 2006, Gusmão called for Prime Minister Mari Alkatiri to resign or else he would, as allegations that Alkatiri had ordered a hit squad to threaten and kill his political opponents led to a large backlash. Senior members of the Fretilin party met on 25 June to discuss Alkatiri's future as the prime minister, amidst a protest involving thousands of people calling for Alkatiri to resign instead of Gusmão. Despite receiving a vote of confidence from his party, Alkatiri resigned on 26 June 2006 to end the uncertainty. In announcing this he said, "I declare I am ready to resign my position as prime minister of the government...so as to avoid the resignation of His Excellency the President of the Republic [Xanana Gusmão]." The 'hit squad' accusations against Alkatiri were subsequently rejected by a UN Commission, which also criticised Gusmão for making inflammatory statements during the crisis.

Gusmão declined to run for another term in the April 2007 presidential election. In March 2007 he said that he would lead the new National Congress for Timorese Reconstruction (CNRT) into the parliamentary election planned to be held later in the year, and said that he would be willing to become prime minister if his party won the election. He was succeeded as president by José Ramos-Horta on 20 May 2007. The CNRT placed second in the June 2007 parliamentary election, behind Fretilin, taking 24.10% of the vote and 18 seats. He won a seat in parliament as the first name on the CNRT's candidate list. The CNRT allied with other parties to form a coalition that would hold a majority of seats in parliament. After weeks of dispute between this coalition and Fretilin over who should form the government, Ramos-Horta announced on 6 August that the CNRT-led coalition would form the government and that Gusmão would become prime minister on 8 August. Gusmão was sworn in at the presidential palace in Dili on 8 August.

On 11 February 2008, a motorcade containing Gusmão came under gunfire one hour after President José Ramos-Horta was shot in the stomach. Gusmão's residence was also occupied by rebels. According to the Associated Press, the incidents raised the possibility of a coup attempt; they have also described as possible assassination attempts and kidnap attempts.

In the 2012 parliamentary elections in Timor-Timor, Gusmão succeeded in re-entering parliament. With the CNRT as the strongest party, he also leads the new government as Prime Minister and Minister of Defence. Alfredo Pires took over as Minister of Petroleum and Natural Resources. Again, Gusmão renounced his seat in parliament.

At the beginning of 2015, Gusmão announced his intention to reshuffle the government and also to resign early himself. On 5 February, he informed his coalition partners that he intended to propose former Health Minister Rui Araújo as his successor and resigned by writing to President Taur Matan Ruak. The President accepted his resignation and appointed Araújo to form a new government. The handover of office took place on 16 February. In the new government, Gusmão is "Consultative Minister" and Minister of Planning and Strategic Investment.

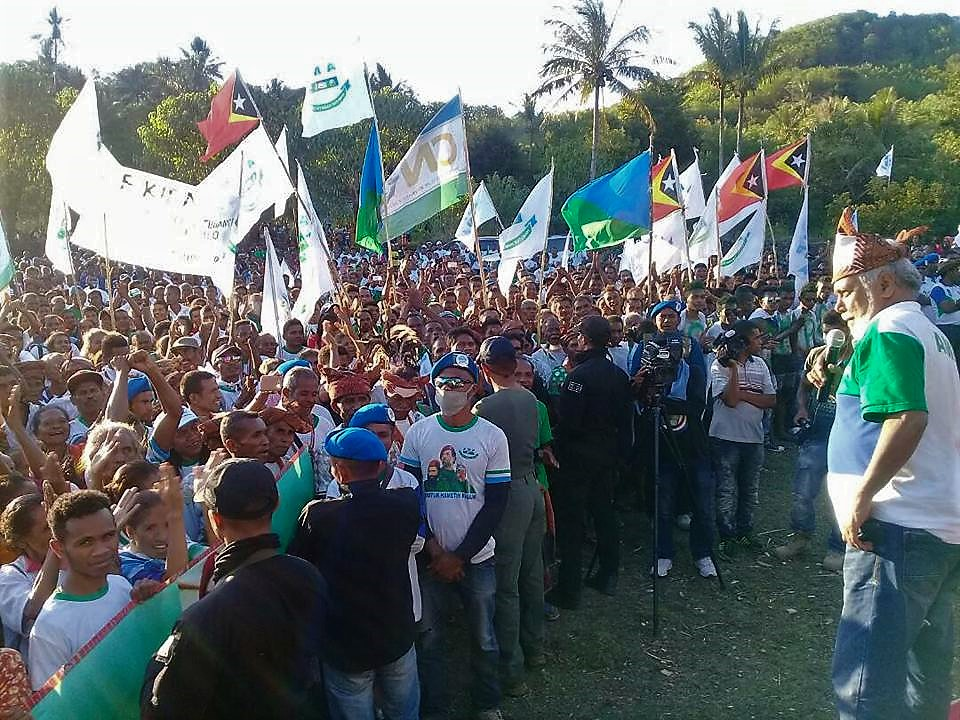
Gusmão at a AMP campaign event in 2018 in Oesilo

In the 2017 parliamentary elections in Timor-Leste, Gusmão succeeded in entering parliament as the CNRT's list leader. However, the CNRT suffered heavy losses and came a close second behind Fretilin. On 4 August 2017, Gusmão announced his resignation as CNRT party leader. However, this resignation was not accepted at the extraordinary party congress and was later simply ignored. The CNRT went into opposition, which is why Gusmão lost his ministerial post. He also renounced his seat in parliament after the first day of the session.

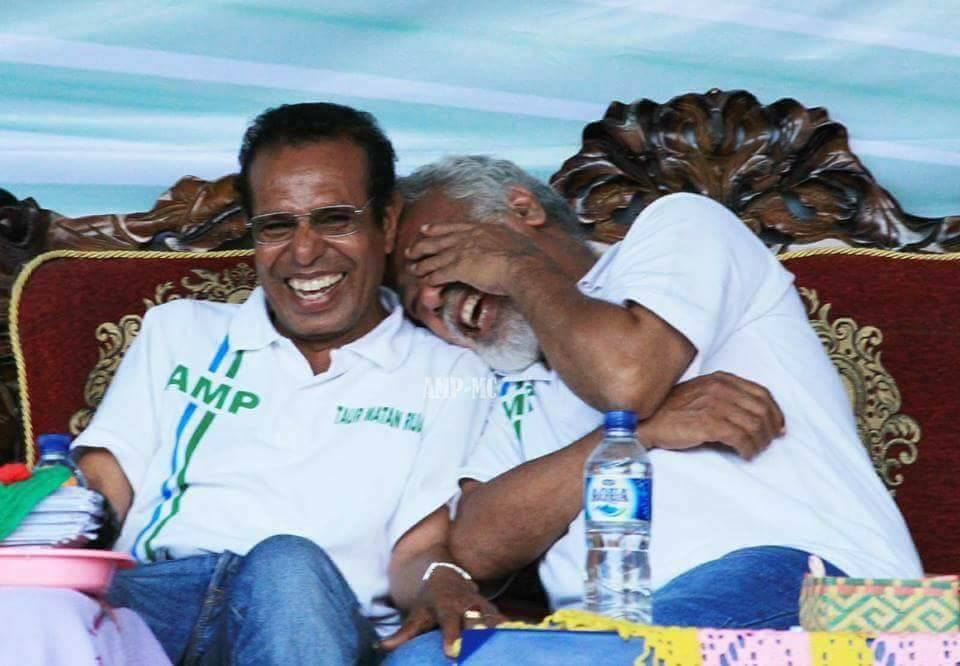
The 2018 election winners: Taur Matan Ruak and Xanana Gusmão

In the border disputes between Australia and Timor-Leste, Gusmão worked as Timor-Leste's chief negotiator. After the successful conclusion of the new Timor Sea border treaty on 6 March 2018, he received a triumphant reception and a hero's welcome from thousands of East Timorese on his return to Dili. In the 2018 general elections, Gusmão represented the CNRT in the Alliance for Change and Progress (AMP) trio and entered parliament at number one on the list. However, he renounced his mandate already for the first session on 13 June. On 5 July, Gusmão was appointed Minister of State of the Council of the Prime Minister and Minister of Planning and Strategic Investment by President Francisco Guterres. Due to the conflict with the President of the Republic over the appointment of CNRT ministers, Gusmão stayed away from the scheduled dates of his swearing-in ceremony and eventually renounced his position in the VIII Government. However, he continued to have responsibility for the Maritime Boundaries Office and continued negotiations with Australia until 2022. On 18 December 2019, Gusmão was also appointed by Cabinet as the Blue Economy Representative.

In the 2022 Timor-Leste presidential elections, Gusmão ran Ramos-Horta as the CNRT candidate. Gusmão played a central role in the election campaign, pushing Ramos-Horta into the background. In the event of an election, Gusmão announced that Ramos-Horta would dissolve parliament and call early elections. Ramos-Horta was more cautious about the matter and instead announced that he wanted to hold talks with all parties. On 20 May 2022, Ramos-Horta took up his second term as president.

In October 2022, several families in Dili's Aimeti Laran and Becusi Craic neighbourhoods were to be evicted from their homes. The landowner had enforced this in court, while the families justified their right to live there by saying they had been living there for decades. A team from the District Court and the National Police had already removed the belongings of seven families in Becusi Craic when Xanana Gusmão intervened with media attention. He ordered the police officers to carry the families' belongings back into the houses and waited until they had finished the job. As a result, Judge Zulmira Auxiliadora Barros da Silva, who had ordered the evictions, was publicly defamed. The events became known as the "Aimeti Laran case" and the "Becussi Craic". In April 2023, the Conselho Superior da Magistratura Judicial (CSMJ) issued a press release expressing regret for the judge's "campaign of professional disparagement" and criticising the "total obstruction" of the execution of the sentence with the media present. The CSMJ concluded that the judge had acted correctly, declared its solidarity with the judicial officials involved and insisted on the sovereignty of the judiciary.

In the 2023 East Timorese parliamentary election, the CNRT won 41% of the votes and gained 31 seats out of 65 in the National Parliament. On 1 July 2023, Gusmão was sworn in as prime minister after his party's victory in the parliamentary election.

== Awards and honours ==
=== Awards ===
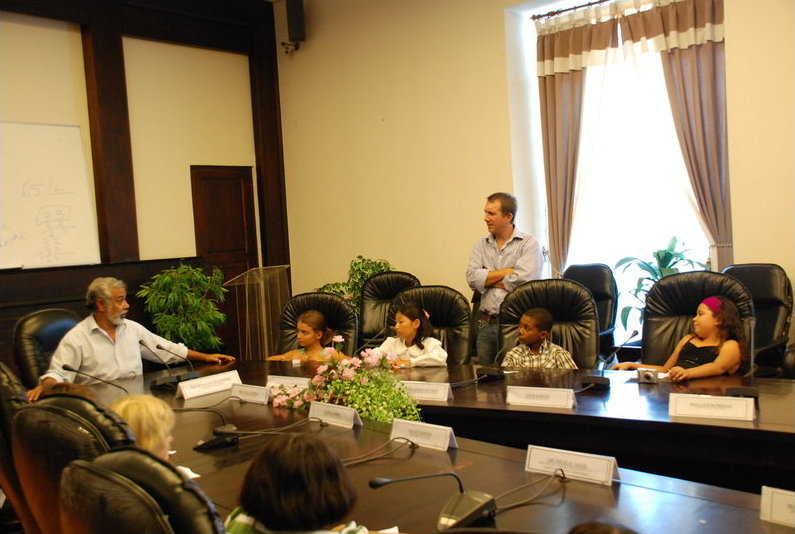
Meeting Students of DIS – Dili International School, 22 October 2009

In 1999, Gusmão was awarded the Sakharov Prize for Freedom of Thought.

In 2000, he was awarded the Sydney Peace Prize for being a "courageous and principled leader for the independence of the East Timorese people".

Also in 2000, he won the first Gwangju Prize for Human Rights, created to honour "individuals, groups or institutions in Korea and abroad that have contributed in promoting and advancing human rights, democracy and peace through their work."

In 2002, he was awarded the North–South Prize by the Council of Europe.

Gusmão is an Eminent Member of the Sérgio Vieira de Mello Foundation.

=== Honours ===
- Brazil:
  - Collar of the Order of the Southern Cross (2012)
    - São Paulo:
      - Grand Cross of the Order of Ipiranga (3 March 2011)
- Indonesia:
  - First Class Adipurna of the Star of the Republic of Indonesia (10 October 2014)
- New Zealand:
  - Honorary Companion of the New Zealand Order of Merit (6 July 2000)
- Portugal:
  - Grand Collar of the Order of Prince Henry (14 February 2006)
  - Grand Cross of the Order of Liberty (9 June 1993)
- United Kingdom:
  - Honorary Knight Grand Cross of the Most Distinguished Order of Saint Michael and Saint George (2003)

== Works ==
(This list includes only works published in English.)

- A Travesty of Justice: Xanana's Defence. Fairfield, NSW, Australia: East Timor Relief Association. 1996. ISBN 0646282034.
- Gusmão, Xanana; Couto, Mia (1998). Mar Meu: Poemas e Pinturas / My Sea of Timor: Poems and Paintings (in Portuguese and English). Porto: Granito Editores e Livreiros. ISBN 9729753040.
- Bird, Ross (photographs); Gusmão, Xanana (text) (1999). Inside Out East Timor. East Melbourne, Vic, Australia: Herman Press. ISBN 0957718098.
- To Resist is to Win!: The Autobiography of Xanana Gusmão with Selected Letters & Speeches. Richmond, Vic, Australia: Aurora Books with David Lovell Publishing. 2000. ISBN 1863550712.
- Peace-Building: The Challenge for East Timor (PDF). 2000 Sydney Peace Prize Lecture / CPACS Occasional Paper No. 00/4. Sydney: Centre for Peace and Conflict Studies, University of Sydney. 2000. ISBN 1864874376.
- Timor Lives! speeches of freedom and independence. Alexandria, NSW, Australia: Longueville Media. 2005. ISBN 1921004169.
- Strategies for the Future: Speeches 2007-2011. Haberfield, NSW: Longueville Books. 2012. ISBN 9781920681784.
- Raising a Nation: The Speeches of Xanana Gusmao 2011-2014. Haberfield, NSW, Australia: Longueville Media. 2015. ISBN 9781920681999.
- The Sky is Ours: Speeches on Unity, Prosperity, and Development in a New Timor-Leste 2017-2024. Haberfield, NSW, Australia: Longueville Media. 2024. ISBN 9781763536166.

Party political offices
New political party	Leader of the National Congress for Timorese Reconstruction; 2007–present	Incumbent
Political offices
New office	President of East Timor; 2002–2007	Succeeded by José Ramos-Horta
Preceded by Estanislau da Silva	Prime Minister of East Timor; 2007–2015	Succeeded by Rui Maria de Araújo
Preceded by Taur Matan Ruak	Prime Minister of East Timor; 2023–present	Incumbent
