= National Congress for Timorese Reconstruction =

East Timorese political party founded in 2007

National Congress for Timorese Reconstruction Congresso Nacional de Reconstrução de Timor
- Leader: Xanana Gusmão
- Founded: March 2007
- Headquarters: Bairo Gurilhus, Dili
- Youth wing: Youth Party Organisation
- Women's wing: Women's Party Organisation
- Ideology: Social democracy
- Political position: Centre-left
- Colours: Blue, White, Green, Gold, Brown
- National Parliament: 31 / 65 (48%)

Party flag

Website
- partidocnrt.com

The National Congress for Timorese Reconstruction (Portuguese: Congresso Nacional de Reconstrução de Timor, CNRT) is a political party in East Timor founded by former President Xanana Gusmão in March 2007 in preparation for the 2007 parliamentary election.

According to provisional results, the party won 24.10% of the vote in the 2007 election, placing second behind FRETILIN, which won 29%. Based on the results, the CNRT would have 18 seats in parliament. In early July, the CNRT agreed to form a coalition with the Timorese Social Democratic Association–Social Democratic Party alliance and the Democratic Party to gain a parliamentary majority. The party, with its coalition partners, participated in talks with FRETILIN later in the month, with President José Ramos-Horta calling for the formation of a national unity government, but these talks were not successful. After weeks of dispute between the CNRT-led coalition and FRETILIN over who should form the government, Ramos-Horta announced on 6 August that the coalition would form the government and that Gusmão would become prime minister.

The main party of three-party coalition, Alliance of Change for Progress (AMP), National Congress for Timorese Reconstruction, led by independence hero Xanana Gusmao, was in power from 2007–17, but leader of Fretilin Mari Alkatiri formed a coalition government after July 2017 parliamentary election. However, the new minority government soon fell, meaning second general election in May 2018. In June 2018, former president and independence fighter Jose Maria de Vasconcelos known as Taur Matan Ruak of three-party coalition, Alliance of Change for Progress (AMP), became the new prime minister.

== Election results ==
=== Presidential elections ===
Election	Candidate	1st round (Total votes)	Share of votes	Result	2nd round (Total votes)	Share of votes	Result
2022	José Ramos-Horta	303,477	46.56%	Runoff	398,028	62.10%	Elected

=== Legislative elections ===
Election	Leader	Votes		Seats		Position	Status
Election	Leader	Total	%	No.	±	Position	Status
2007	Xanana Gusmão	100,175	24.10%	18 / 65		▲2nd	Governing coalition (CNRT-PSD-ASDT-PD)
2012	Xanana Gusmão	172,831	36.66%	30 / 65	▲12	▲1st	Governing coalition (CNRT-PD)
2017	Xanana Gusmão	167,330	29.46%	22 / 65	▼8	▼2nd	Opposition
2018 (Note: Run as part of the Alliance for Change and Progress.)	Xanana Gusmão	309,663	49.58%	21 / 65	▼1	▲1st	Governing coalition (until 2020) (CNRT-PLP-KHUNTO)
2018	Xanana Gusmão	309,663	49.58%	21 / 65	▼1	▲1st	Opposition (from 2020)
2023	Xanana Gusmão	288,289	41.63%	31 / 65	▲10	1st	Governing coalition (CNRT-PD)
