= Irene Gonzaga Sarmento =

East Timorese politician (born 1986)

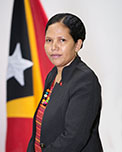

Member of the National Parliament of Timor-Leste
- Incumbent
- Assumed office 2018

Personal details
- Born: 2 April 1986 (age 40) Manatuto, East Timor
- Party: KHUNTO

Irene Gonzaga Sarmento (born 2 April 1986) is an East Timorese politician. A member of the Kmanek Haburas Unidade Nasional Timor Oan (KHUNTO) political party, she has served in the National Parliament since 2018.

== Early life and education ==
Irene Gonzaga Sarmento was born in Manatuto, East Timor on 2 April 1986. She had completed secondary school.

== Political career ==
Sarmento ran in the 2012 parliamentary election, finishing in 12th place on the KHUNTO list and 6th on the same list in the 2017 parliamentary elections, thus failing to win a seat in both elections. The following year, in the snap parliamentary elections held on 12 May, she also narrowly missed entering parliament, in which she finished in 36th place on the list of Alliance for Change and Progress (AMP), the joint list of the National Congress for Timorese Reconstruction, People's Liberation Party and KHUNTO. At the end of the June, however, Sarmento took the seat of MPs who resigned in order to take up a government post. She was named to the parliamentary committee on infrastructure (Committee E).

In the 2023 parliamentary election, Sarmento was re-elected to parliament, although not on the KHUNTO party list, in which the party won five seats. She then became secretary of the parliamentary committee on infrastructure affairs (Committee E).
