= 2027 East Timorese presidential election =

- March 2027
President before election
José Ramos-Horta
CNRT
Elected President
TBD

Presidential elections are scheduled to be held in Timor-Leste in March 2027 to elect the president for a term of five years. In the 2022 election, José Ramos-Horta won a non-consecutive second term, having previously served as president from 2007 to 2012. Ramos-Horta has stated that he is considering running for re-election in 2027 for a third term, raising questions about term limits, as Timor-Leste's constitution states that a president may "renew" his term only once. As of 14 November 2026, six candidates, Armanda Berta dos Santos of KHUNTO and independents Francisco Dionisio Fernandes "Mau-Kura", Joaquim da Fonseca, Lere Anan Timur, Milena Pires, and Rui Maria de Araújo, have announced their intentions to stand in the election.

== Background ==
In the 2022 presidential election, former President José Ramos-Horta of the National Congress for Timorese Reconstruction (CNRT) defeated incumbent President Francisco "Lú-Olo" Guterres of Fretilin. In what was described as a landslide victory, Ramos-Horta won 62 percent of votes against Guterres' 38 percent in the second round of voting. The election marked the first time a president was re-elected to a second term (albeit non-consecutively), as well as the second time that an incumbent president lost re-election—after the 2012 election, was Ramos-Horta was eliminated in the first round of voting. In the 2023 parliamentary election the following year, the CNRT won a plurality of seats and formed a coalition government with the Democratic Party, with Xanana Gusmão serving as prime minister.

In March 2026, Ramos-Horta announced that he was considering running for re-election and stated that any candidate running in 2027 must be "loyal" to Prime Minister Xanana Gusmão. His statement generated public discussion around the legality of a third presidential run by Ramos-Horta, as Timor-Leste's constitution states that a president may "renew" his term only once. His remarks demanding candidates' loyalty to the prime minister also drew criticism from civil society groups. The executive director of FONGTIL, the national network of local non-governmental organizations, urged the president to retire and allow a new generation of leaders to step forward.

In April 2026, the Council of Ministers approved a resolution to maintain the country's current administrative divisions to avoid disrupting preparations for the 2027 presidential election. Under the resolution, proposed to the council by Minister of State Administration Tomás Cabral, no new administrative posts or sucos (villages) will be created until after the election. In May 2026, the National Elections Commission (CNE) and Technical Secretariat for Electoral Administration (STAE) began coordinating with Timor-Leste's registered political parties to prepare for the 2027 election. In June 2026, the STAE began the process of identifying polling stations, registering new voters, and establishing a biometric voter database system.

On 6 November 2026, during a National Women's Day celebration, Prime Minister Gusmão announced that he would support a female candidate for president in 2027.

== Electoral system ==
The president is elected to a five-year term by popular vote in a two-round system in which a candidate needs an absolute majority (50 percent + 1) to win. If no candidate receives an absolute majority, a second round of voting between the two candidates with the highest number of votes will be held 30 days after the first round. All East Timorese citizens over age 17 are eligible to vote, except individuals whose voting rights have been removed by a court decision and those who are "clearly and publicly known as mentally ill". The number and location of polling centers are to be announced by the Technical Secretariat for Electoral Administration (STAE) no later than 30 days before election day. By law, polling centers open to voters at 7 a.m. on election day and close at 3 p.m.; the voting process ends when all voters already in the queue at 3 p.m. have voted.

Timor-Leste's two election management bodies are the National Elections Commission and the Technical Secretariat for Electoral Administration. The CNE is an independent body whose main role is to oversee STAE's activities and ensure that constitutional and legal norms are followed during elections and that the electoral rights of candidates and voters are respected. The STAE is responsible for implementing elections, including drafting electoral regulations, managing voter registrations, providing information to voters, administering the voting process, and counting votes.

The 2027 presidential election is scheduled to be held in March 2027. If no candidate receives an absolute majority, by law a second round of voting will occur in April 2027.

=== Eligibility ===
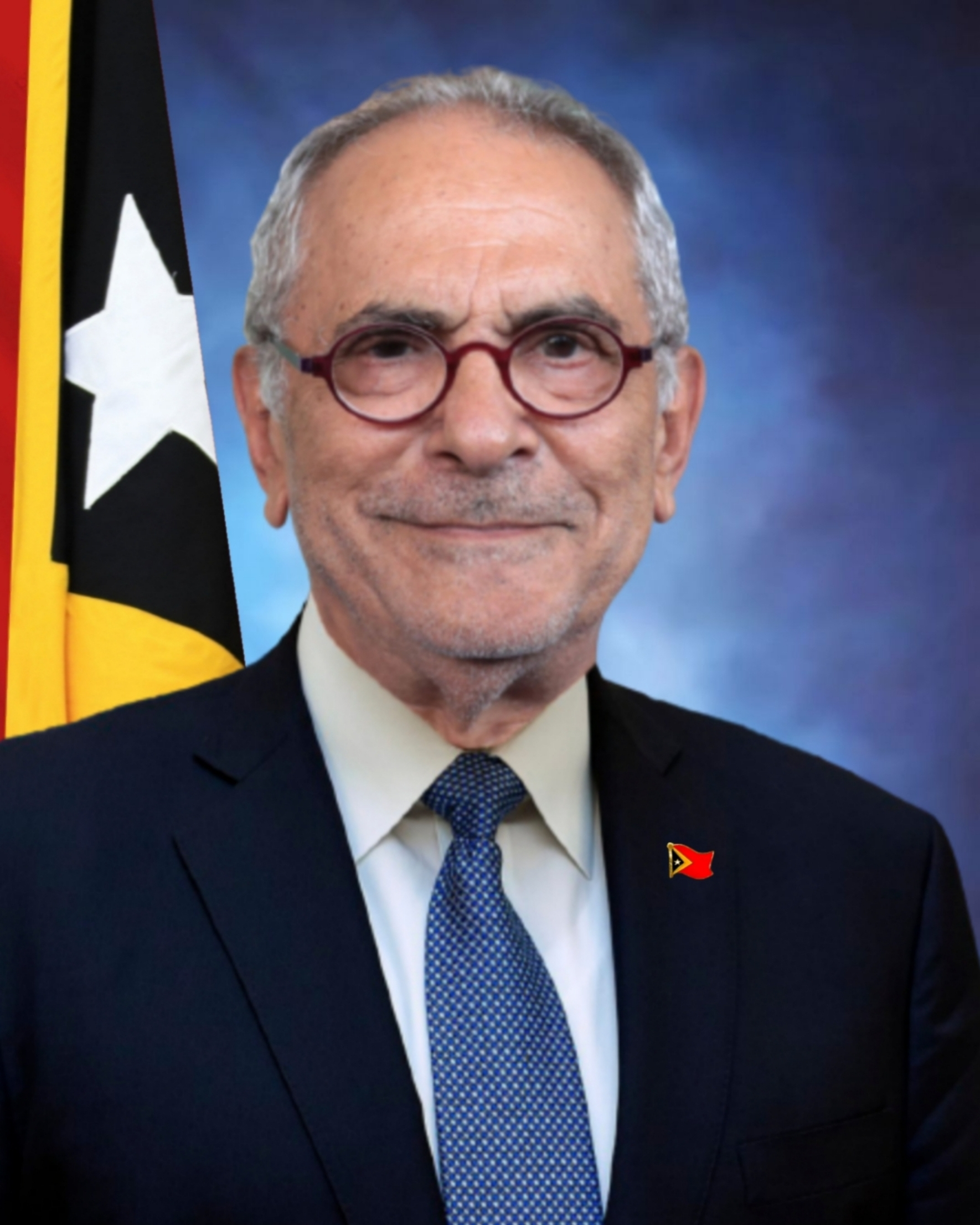
Incumbent President José Ramos-Horta

Presidential candidates must hold original East Timorese citizenship, be at least 35 years old, and "be in possession of his or her faculties." Judges and public prosecutors, career diplomats, civil servants, military and police officers, religious ministers, and National Elections Commission (CNE) members are ineligible to stand as presidential candidates. Officially, candidates run as individuals, though some are backed by political parties. A candidate must receive 5,000 signatures of support to stand in a presidential election.

Ramos-Horta's announcement in March 2026 that he was undecided on whether to stand for re-election in 2027 raised constitutional questions, as he previously served as president from 2007 to 2012 before being elected again in 2022. The Constitution of Timor-Leste, which in Article 75, section 3, states that "The President of the Republic's term of office may be renewed only once", is not explicit as to whether a president's terms of office must be consecutive for the limit to apply. In one interpretation, a candidate is limited to a maximum of two terms; in the other interpretation, a candidate such as Ramos-Horta, who was elected non-consecutively to a second term, may "renew" his term and be re-elected once more.

Alexandre Corte-Real, a constitutional scholar and law professor at the Universidade Nacional Timor Lorosa'e, has stated that the constitutional language of "renewal" implies continuity and thus applies only to incumbent presidents. In this interpretation, because Ramos-Horta's two terms as president were non-consecutive, his first term does not count towards the established limit, and he is therefore eligible to run in 2027 for an additional term. In September 2026, the opposition parties Fretilin and KHUNTO stated that they viewed a potential re-candidacy by Ramos-Horta as constitutionally valid.

== Candidates ==
=== Declared candidates ===
- Armanda Berta dos Santos (KHUNTO): Minister of Social Solidarity and Inclusion (2018–2023); Deputy Prime Minister (2020–2023)
- Francisco Dionisio Fernandes "Mau-Kura" (independent): independence activist and diplomat
- Joaquim da Fonseca (independent): independence activist and diplomat
- Lere Anan Timur (independent): Commander of the Timor-Leste Defence Force (2011–2022)
- Milena Pires (independent) politician, diplomat, and activist; Permanent Representative of Timor-Leste to the United Nations (2016–2020)
- Rui Maria de Araújo (independent): Minister of Health (2001–2006); Deputy Prime Minister (2006–2007); Prime Minister (2015–2017); Minister of Health (2017–2018)

=== Potential candidates ===
The following individuals have been mentioned in the media or opinion polling as potential candidates or have personally expressed interest in running:

- Adérito Hugo da Costa (CNRT): journalist and politician; President of the National Parliament (2016–2017)
- Adriano do Nascimento (PD): academic and politician; Minister of the Presidency of the Council of Ministers (2017–2018)
- Aniceto Guterres Lopes (Fretilin): human rights lawyer and politician; President of the National Parliament (2017–2018; 2020–2023)
- António da Conceição "Kalohan" (PD): Minister of Commerce, Industry and Environment (2012–2015); Minister of State, Coordinator of Social Affairs, and Minister of Education 2015–2017); Minister for Commerce and Industry (2017–2018)
- Bendito Freitas (CNRT): Minister of Education (2015–2017); Minister of Foreign Affairs and Cooperation (2023–present)
- Fidelis Leite Magalhães (PLP): political economist; Minister for Legislative Reform and Parliamentary Affairs (2018–2020); Minister of the Presidency of the Council of Ministers (2020–2023)
- Francisco Kalbuadi Lay (CNRT): Minister of Tourism (2012–2015); Minister of Tourism, Arts and Culture (2015–2017); Deputy Prime Minister (2023–present); Minister of Tourism and Environment (2023–present); Coordinating Minister of Economic Affairs (2023–present)
- Gil da Costa Monteiro "Oan Soru" (CNRT): Minister of National Liberation Combatants' Affairs (2023–present)
- Jorge Serrano: President of the Chamber of Commerce and Industry of Timor-Leste
- José Ramos-Horta (CNRT): Minister of Foreign Affairs and Cooperation (2002–2006); Prime Minister (2006–2007); President (2007–2012, 2022–present)
- José Reis (Fretilin): Minister of Planning and Territory (2020–2023); Deputy Prime Minister (2020–2023)
- Lourenço de Oliveira: businessman; executive director of Aero Dili
- Taur Matan Ruak (PLP): President (2012–2017); Prime Minister (2018–2023)
- Tomás Cabral (CNRT): Minister of State Administration (2023–present)
- Xanana Gusmão (CNRT): President (2002–2007); Prime Minister (2007–2015, 2023–present)

=== Parties not nominating candidates ===
In May 2026, the Green Party of Timor (PVT) and the United Party for Development and Democracy (PUDD) announced that they would not nominate candidates for the 2027 election, instead planning to focus their resources on the 2028 parliamentary election.

On 29 August 2026, the Fretilin central committee approved a resolution that the party would not nominate its own candidate in the presidential election. Fretilin secretary general and interim president, Mari Alkatiri, explained that party leaders saw a need to modernize the party and better understand ongoing changes in Timorese society and politics. Alkatari stated that Fretilin politicians are free to stand as candidates independently; several party members, including Francisco Dionisio Fernandes "Mau-Kura", Lere Anan Timur, and Rui Maria de Araújo, are doing so.

== Opinion polling ==
In a September 2026 survey of 575 eligible voters conducted by the Matadalan Survey & Research Institute (M-SRI), Francisco Kalbuadi Lay was named as the first preference of 8.66 percent of respondents, with Lere Anan Timur close behind at 8.62 percent. Incumbent President José Ramos-Horta placed third as the preferred candidate of 8.55 percent of respondents, followed by Taur Matan Ruak at 8.20 percent, Rui Maria de Araújo at 7.37 percent, António da Conceição "Kalohan" at 7.26 percent, and Tomás Cabral at 3.41 percent.

The M-SRI survey also polled respondents' knowledge of potential candidates, with Ramos-Horta placing first at 86 percent, followed by Taur Matan Ruak at 80 percent, Kalbuadi Lay at 79 percent, Lere Anan Timur 72 percent, and Araújo at 66 percent. Lesser-known candidates included Jorge Manuel Serrano (22 percent), Joaquim da Fonseca (21 percent), and Lourenço de Oliveira (20 percent). Other candidates and potential candidates included in the survey included Armanda Berta dos Santos, Bendito Freitas, Adérito Hugo da Costa, Fidelis Leite Magalhães, Adriano do Nascimento, Milena Pires, José Reis, and Gil da Costa Monteiro "Oan Soru".

== See also ==
- 2027 national electoral calendar
- List of elections in 2027
