= Armanda Berta dos Santos =

East Timorese politician

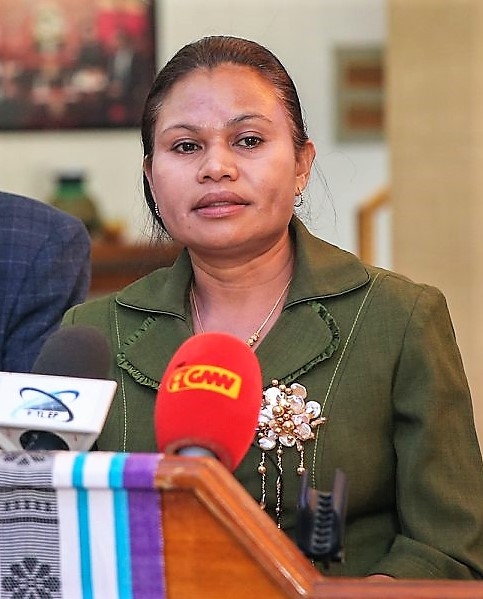
- Santos in 2020

Deputy Prime Minister of Timor-Leste
- In office 29 May 2020 – 1 July 2023 Serving with José Reis
- Prime Minister: Taur Matan Ruak
- Preceded by: Office re-established
- Succeeded by: Francisco Kalbuadi Lay and; Mariano Sabino Lopes

Minister of Social Solidarity and Inclusion
- In office 22 June 2018 – 1 July 2023
- Prime Minister: Taur Matan Ruak
- Preceded by: Florentina Martins Smith
- Succeeded by: Verónica das Dores

Member of Parliament
- In office 5 September 2017 – 22 June 2018

President of KHUNTO
- Incumbent
- Assumed office 2011
- Preceded by: Office established

Personal details
- Born: 11 October 1974 (age 51) Dili, Portuguese Timor (now Timor-Leste)
- Party: KHUNTO
- Spouse: José dos Santos Bucar
- Education: Universidade da Paz; Universitas Teknologi Surabaya

Armanda Berta dos Santos (born 11 October 1974) is an East Timorese politician and president of the Kmanek Haburas Unidade Nasional Timor Oan (KHUNTO) political party.

Santos was raised in Ainaro Municipality and was involved in clandestine activities during the Indonesian occupation of East Timor. In 2011, she and her husband José dos Santos "Naimori" Bucar founded KHUNTO, which is closely linked to the Kmanek Oan Rai Klaran (KORK) martial arts group. In the 2017 parliamentary election, she was elected to the National Parliament of Timor-Leste.

After the 2018 election, became Minister of Social Solidarity and Inclusion in the VIII Constitutional Government, a coalition government comprising KHUNTO, the CNRT, and the Democratic Party. When a reorganized coalition was formed in 2020, she became one of Timor-Leste's two Deputy Prime Ministers, (Note: The Constitution of Timor-Leste provides, in sections 104 and 105, for the appointment of officials referred to in its English language version as "Deputy Ministers". In other English language publications, those officials are commonly referred to as "Vice Ministers", even though the word "Vice", in context, arguably has a different meaning in English from the word "Deputy". In this article, the constitutional expression "Deputy" is used.) serving until the government's dissolution in June 2023.

Santos is running as KHUNTO's candidate in the 2027 East Timorese presidential election.

== Early life and education ==
Santos was born on 11 October 1974 in the Maloa, Dili, in what was then Portuguese Timor, to a poor family. Following the Indonesian invasion and occupation of East Timor beginning in 1975, her family fled to the forests, where they remained for five years. In 1980, they emerged from hiding and settled in a town in Ainaro Municipality, where Santos completed her primary through secondary education. Like many East Timorese women, Santos was involved in clandestine resistance activities against the Indonesian occupation, going by the code name "Labok". In 1994, she joined the clandestine organization FITUN with her husband José dos Santos "Naimori" Bucar, operating in the Aileu, Ainaro, Cova Lima, and Manufahi areas.

In 2012, she earned an undergraduate degree in management from Universidade da Paz in Dili. She continued her studies at Universitas Teknologi Surabaya in Surabaya, Indonesia, earning a master's degree in governmental management in 2015.

== Political career ==
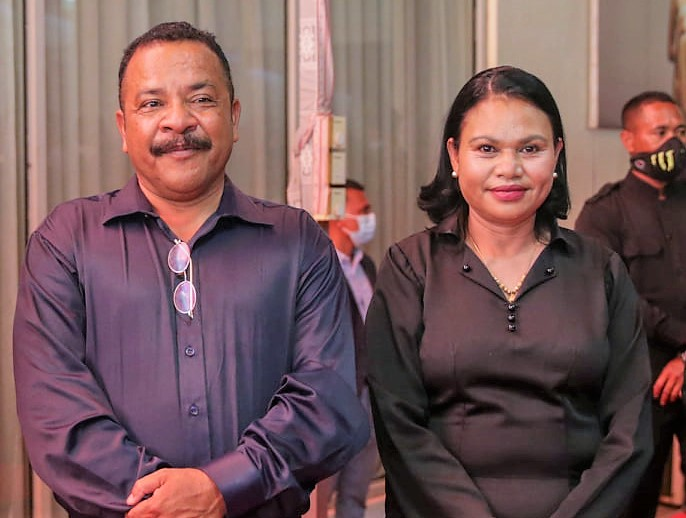
Santos and her husband José dos Santos "Naimori" Bucar in 2022

Since 2011, Santos has been president of Kmanek Haburas Unidade Nasional Timor Oan (KHUNTO), with her husband José dos Santos "Naimori" Bucar serving as the party's supreme leader. The party is closely linked with the Kmanek Oan Rai Klaran (KORK) ritual arts group, of which Naimori is the leader. The party runs on an anti-corruption platform and draws its support largely from young, rural voters with connections to martial arts groups.

In KHUNTO's electoral debut in the 2012 parliamentary election, the party won 2.97% of the popular vote, just short of the 3% electoral threshold to earn seats in Timor-Leste's National Parliament. In the 2017 parliamentary election, KHUNTO won 6.5 of votes and five seats in parliament, including Santos, who topped KHUNTO's party list. In parliament, Santos served as vice chair of the infrastructure, transport, and communications committee and as a member of the economic affairs and development committee.

Following the 2017 election, KHUNTO played the role of kingmaker in the subsequent negotiations to form a new government. Initially forming a deal with Fretilin—the first-placing party in the election—and the Democratic Party, KHUNTO backed out at the last minute, eliminating new Prime Minister Mari Alkatiri's parliamentary majority. In January 2018, President Francisco Guterres dissolved the parliament and called for new elections.

In the 2018 parliamentary election, KHUNTO ran as part of the Alliance for Change and Progress (AMP), along with the National Congress for Timorese Reconstruction (CNRT) and the People's Liberation Party (PLP). On election day, the AMP received nearly half of the popular vote and won a 34-seat majority of seats in parliament. Santos, who was placed third on the AMP's candidate list, was re-elected to parliament. On 22 June 2018, she was sworn in as Minister of Social Solidarity and Inclusion in the VIII Constitutional Government. Upon becoming a minister, she vacated her seat in parliament, in accordance with Timor-Leste's election law. In March 2020, at KHUNTO's second national congress, Santos was reelected as the party's president for the period of 2020 to 2024.

Following a breakdown of the AMP alliance in the first months of 2020, the CNRT—the leading party in the coalition—decided on 30 April 2020 that its members serving in the VIII Constitutional Government would resign their positions. KHUNTO and the PLP remained in the government and went on to form a new coalition with Fretilin and the Democratic Party on 12 May 2020. Santos retained her position as Minister of Social Solidarity and Inclusion and was inaugurated on 29 May 2020 as one of two new Deputy Prime Ministers, along with José Reis of Fretilin.

While serving in the VIII Constitutional Government, Santos ran as KHUNTO's candidate in the 2022 presidential election. In an analysis published by the University of Melbourne in Australia, she was described as "an enigmatic candidate... [whose] gender, socio-economic status and rural background mark her out as an outsider from the usual Dili political and civil society elite." During the campaign, Santos was the subject of mockery on social media after she objected to a requirement that the national presidential debate be conducted in Portuguese. She pointed out that neither she, nor the majority of Timor-Leste's population, would be able to participate in or even understand such a debate. On election day, Santos won 56,690 votes (8.7% of the total), finishing third after José Ramos-Horta (CNRT) and Francisco Guterres (Fretilin).

In the 2023 parliamentary election, KHUNTO won 7.5% of the vote and five seats in the National Parliament. Santos was first on KHUNTO's candidate list and was a member-elect following the election, but did not take her seat in parliament. Her tenure as Deputy Prime Minister and minister ended when the new IX Constitutional Government took office on 1 July 2023. In April 2024, Santos was re-elected as president of KHUNTO at the party's fourth national congress.

On 24 May 2026, KHUNTO announced that it had nominated Santos as its candidate in the 2027 presidential election.
