= Fidelis Leite Magalhães =

East Timorese political economist, public policy specialist and politician

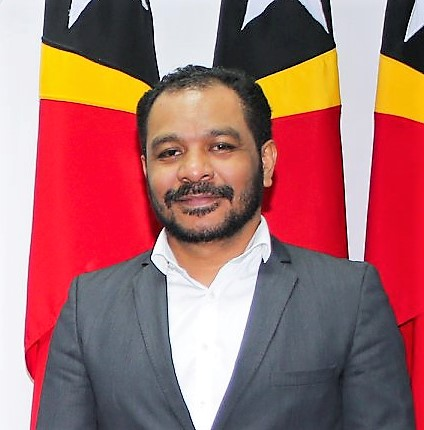
- Magalhães in 2019

Minister of the Presidency of the Council of Ministers
- In office 29 May 2020 – 1 July 2023
- Prime Minister: Taur Matan Ruak
- Preceded by: Office re-established
- Succeeded by: Ágio Pereira

Minister for Legislative Reform and Parliamentary Affairs
- In office 22 June 2018 – 29 May 2020
- Prime Minister: Taur Matan Ruak
- Succeeded by: Office abolished

Member of the National Parliament
- In office 2017–2018

Chief of Staff to the President
- In office 20 May 2012 – June 2015
- President: Taur Matan Ruak
- Succeeded by: Rui Augusto Gomes

Personal details
- Born: June 9, 1983 (age 43): Maliana, Bobonaro, East Timor, Indonesia
- Party: People's Liberation Party
- Spouse: Maria Angela Neves Oliveira
- Children: 1 son
- Relatives: Nívio Leite Magalhães (Brother)
- Education: University of Hawaiʻi at Mānoa; London School of Economics; University of Lisbon; Harvard Kennedy School

Fidelis Manuel Leite Magalhães is an East Timorese political economist, public policy specialist and politician, and a former member of the People's Liberation Party (PLP).

From May 2020 to July 2023, he was the President of the Council of Ministers, serving in the VIII Constitutional Government of East Timor led by Prime Minister Taur Matan Ruak.

Previously, from 2018 to 2020, he was Minister for Legislative Reform and Parliamentary Affairs in the same government, and, from July 2019, also acting Coordinating Minister of Economic Affairs and acting Minister of Tourism, Trade and Industry.

== Early life and career ==
Magalhães was born in 1983 in Maliana, the capital of what is now the municipality of Bobonaro in the west of East Timor. He is the second child of Manuel Magalhães and Regina Cardoso Gouveia Leite, who had five daughters and three other sons, including the PD politician Nívio Leite Magalhães, State Secretary for Youth and Labor from 2017 to 2018.

Manuel Magalhães was killed during the 1999 East Timorese crisis.

While still a child, Fidelis Magalhães joined the resistance against the Indonesian occupation. At the age of 13, he became a member of the Sagrada Família (Holy Family), a resistance movement with religious features. Magalhães was also a member of a youth gang, Tuba Corente (Firm Chain). Members of that gang were searching for their identity, a process that could be "aggressive and even violent".

In April 1999, due to the wave of violence leading up to the East Timorese independence referendum, the Magalhães family had to flee from Maliana. Indonesian troops had burned down their house and arrested Manuel Magalhães. Fidelis Magalhães, then 16, took refuge in the mountainous jungle of the then Bobonaro district. For six months, he and a friend, Gilberto, lived on dried cassavas, roots, and the charity of jungle villagers, who were equally impoverished and starving. Magalhães remained in the mountains until the INTERFET forces arrived in late September 1999.

Following the departure of the Indonesians in the same year, Magalhães left school and started working for the Jesuit Refugee Services as a driver, to support his family. He also began to work in the field of human rights, under the guidance of Father Frank Brennan. At the end of 2000, he was promoted to the position of Human Rights and Refugee and Returnee officer with Jesuit Refugee Services. In 2001, he represented East Timor's civil society at the UN Session on Human Rights in Geneva. That was his first trip abroad, and he was asked to participate in a series of meetings only a year after he had begun to teach himself English. He has since described the experience as "surreal".

From mid 2001 to 2002, Magalhães worked for various organisations, including the United Nations High Commissioner for Refugees (UNHCR), where for a short period he was its Spokesperson and External Relations Assistant. He also served as the president of the Maliana Youth Committee, which consisted of all the youth organizations in the district.

In late 2002, Magalhães received a US State Department scholarship managed by the East–West Center to study at the University of Hawaiʻi at Mānoa. He graduated with honours majoring in political, social and literary theories, and was also a top student in Latin American and Iberian literature. Under the same scholarship, he also studied for a short time at the University of Massachusetts Amherst.

From 2006, he worked in various capacities. In 2007, he was the Participation Expert on the national dialogue in East Timor for the Deutsche Gesellschaft für Technische Zusammenarbeit (GTZ). In the same year, he was appointed head of the Post-Transitional Dialogue, which was funded by Norway. He then served as team leader on a number of initiatives, and was a principal adviser on development and political issues.

In 2008, Magalhães collaborated with Bishop Gunnar Stålsett, Norway’s Special Envoy to East Timor, in founding the High Level National Consensus Dialogue initiative. Some months later, he obtained a Chevening Scholarship to study Political Economy at the London School of Economics. After completing his studies at the LSE, he was awarded a Gulbenkian Fellowship to read International Political Economy in Lisbon, Portugal. While in Lisbon he also attended post-graduate courses in International Relations at the Higher Institute of Social and Political Sciences of the Technical University of Lisbon (ISCSP-UTL).

== Political career ==
In October 2011, Magalhães returned to East Timor, where he joined Taur Matan Ruak's campaign team in the 2012 East Timorese presidential election. Initially, he was Vice-President for Socio-Political Research and Communication; later, Taur Matan Ruak appointed him as his official spokesman.

After the announcement that Taur Matan Ruak had been elected as President of East Timor, Magalhães was appointed as his representative to ensure a smooth transition to office. On the day of Taur Matan Ruak's swearing-in on 20 May 2012, Magalhães became his chief of staff.

In June 2015, Magalhães resigned as Chief of Staff to return to studying in the United States, this time to study Public Administration at the Harvard Kennedy School (HKS). He was succeeded by Rui Augusto Gomes, previously the President's adviser on economic issues. At the end of that year, Magalhães became one of the co-founders of the People's Liberation Party, which is closely associated with Taur Matan Ruak.

After Magalhães had completed his HKS studies, he became Taur Matan Ruak's senior political adviser; he remained so until the end of the President's term on 20 May 2017, when he was elected as one of six deputies to Taur Matan Ruak as PLP party leader.

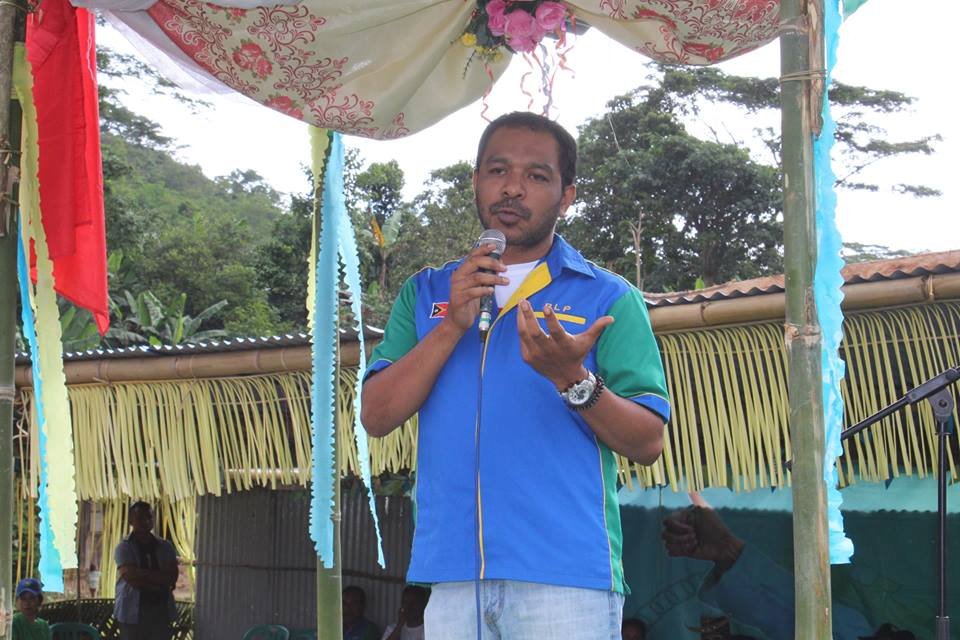
Magalhães campaigning in Lolotoe in 2017

In the 2017 East Timorese parliamentary election, Magalhães was ranked as #2 on the list of the PLP, and was therefore elected as a member of the National Parliament. Following his election, he became the leader of the parliamentary PLP, and President of the Committee on Foreign Affairs, Defense and Security (Commission-B).

On the ballots for the early election in 2018, Magalhães was ranked #7 in the Alliance for Change and Progress (AMP), which was made up of the National Congress for Timorese Reconstruction (Portuguese: Congresso Nacional de Reconstrução de Timor, CNRT), the PLP, and Kmanek Haburas Unidade Nasional Timor Oan (lit. 'Enrich the National Unity of the Sons of Timor', KHUNTO). In the AMP, Magalhães was Vice President of the Alliance. During the election campaign, he conceded that some horse-trading had been necessary to form the alliance. "It was a big compromise for us, yes ...", he told The Irish Times, "... but CNRT has also made compromises. We have had to try to understand each other's programme better." In the election, Magalhães was again elected to the National Parliament.

On 22 June 2018, Magalhães was sworn in as Minister for Legislative Reform and Parliamentary Affairs, which meant that he automatically had to give up his parliamentary seat.

In 2019, Magalhães was appointed as Timor-Leste's Chief Negotiator for the World Trade Organization. Since July 2019, he has been the Chair of the Sixth Asia-Pacific Forum on Sustainable Development, organized by the United Nations Economic and Social Commission for Asia and the Pacific (ESCAP). Also in July 2019, he was appointed as acting Coordinating Minister of Economic Affairs and acting Minister of Tourism, Trade and Industry.

On 12 May 2020, following the breakdown of the AMP coalition during the first few months of 2020, the Council of Ministers approved a restructure of the ministry that included the abolition of Magalhães' portfolio of Minister for Legislative Reform and Parliamentary Affairs, and the absorption of its responsibilities by the Ministry of Justice. On 29 May 2020, Magalhães was sworn in as holder of the re-established, more senior, position of Minister of the Presidency of the Council of Ministers.

Magalhães' tenure as Minister ended when the IX Constitutional Government took office on 1 July 2023. He was succeeded by Ágio Pereira. In 2023, Magalhães began reading for a DPhil in law at the University of Oxford. In 2026, he joined the Maurice R. Greenberg World Fellows Program at Yale University as a Yale World Fellow.
