= 2018 East Timorese parliamentary election =

- 12 May 2018
- All 65 seats in the National Parliament; 33 seats needed for a majority
- Turnout: 80.98% (▲4.24pp)
Party	Leader	Vote %	Seats	+/–
AMP	Xanana Gusmão	49.58	34	−1
Fretilin	Mari Alkatiri	34.16	23	0
Democratic	Mariano Sabino Lopes	8.07	5	−2
FDD	António de Sá Benevides	5.49	3	+3
This lists parties that won seats. See the complete results below.
Most voted-for party by district
Prime Minister before	Prime Minister-designate
Mari Alkatiri; Fretilin	Taur Matan Ruak; PLP

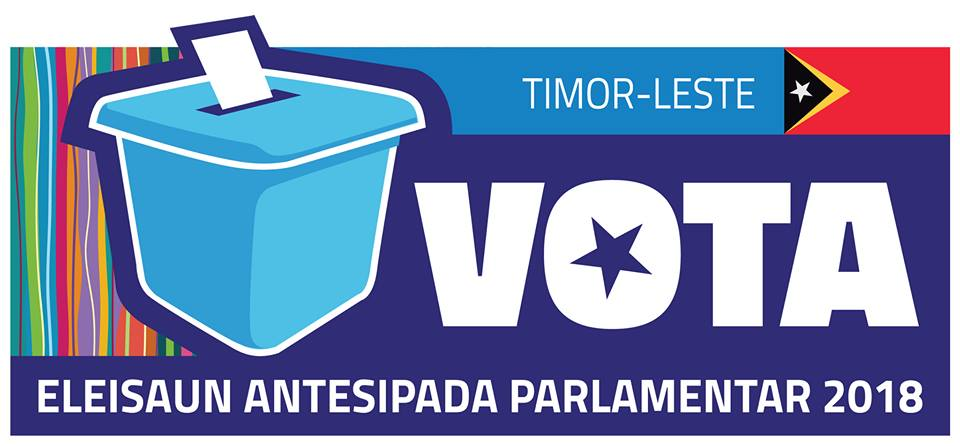
Election call for the early parliamentary elections 2018

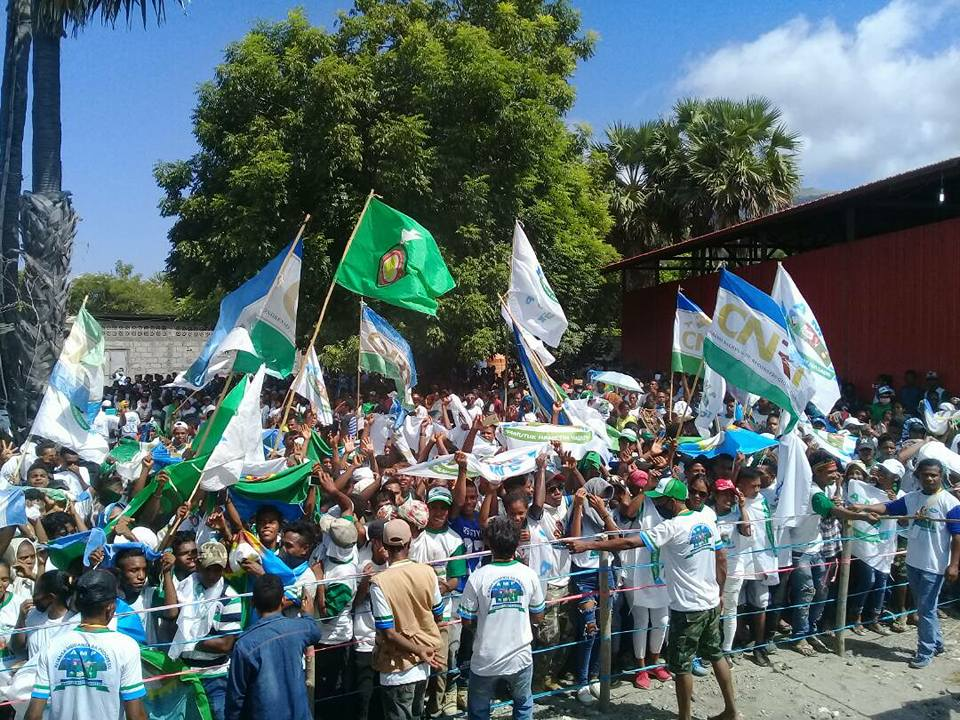
AMP campaign in Atauro in May 2018

Early parliamentary elections were held in Timor-Leste on 12 May 2018 after the National Parliament was dissolved by President Francisco Guterres on 26 January 2018.

The Alliance for Change and Progress (AMP), a coalition of three opposition parties, won an absolute majority of 34 of the 65 seats in Parliament. Voter turnout was 81 percent, five percentage points higher than the previous year. 784,286 people were eligible to vote.

== Background ==
In the 2017 parliamentary elections there was no clear winner, with the Fretilin party of Mari Alkatiri holding only one more seat than the National Congress for Timorese Reconstruction led by Xanana Gusmão. After the Kmanek Haburas Unidade Nasional Timor Oan (KHUNTO) backed out at short notice, Alkatiri formed a minority government with the Democratic Party, which held only 30 of the 65 seats in the National Parliament. The opposition parties National Congress for Timorese Reconstruction (CNRT), People's Liberation Party (PLP) and KHUNTO then formed the Alliance for Change and Progress (AMP) in parliament.

After Alkatiri was unable to push through his budget or the government program against the AMP, the AMP asked President Francisco Guterres to give the coalition the mandate to form a new government. Instead, after talks with representatives of all parties and amidst political deadlock, Guterres dissolved Parliament on 26 January 2018 (Presidential Decree No. 5/2018) and called early elections in accordance with the wishes of Fretilin and PD. The bypassing of the parliamentary majority by President Guterres was judged by commentators and state scholars as an "attack on democracy". He and Alkatiri were accused of "stubbornness" and "arrogance". The prime minister would break the law just to be able to stay in power.

The end of the border dispute between Australia and Timor-Leste came in the period between the dissolution of parliament and the new election. Xanana Gusmão, the leader of the CNRT, as Timor-Leste's chief negotiator, had been able to successfully conclude a new treaty on the border in the Timor Sea. On 6 March 2018, he was given a triumphant reception by thousands of East Timorese on his return to Dili.

== Electoral system ==
On 7 February 2018 President Guterres set the election date for 12 May. On 3 April, the order of parties and alliances on the ballot paper was determined. As in the previous elections in 2017, East Timorese living abroad were able to vote there. Polling stations were located in Lisbon, Porto, Darwin, Sydney, Melbourne, London, Oxford, Dungannon and Seoul.

The 65 members of the National Parliament were elected from a single nationwide constituency by closed list proportional representation. Parties were required to have a woman in at least every third position in their list. Seats were allocated using the d'Hondt method with the last seat, in the case of several equal maximum numbers, being awarded to the party with the fewest votes. With seats allocated at an electoral threshold of four percent.

As in previous elections, once voters had voted, they were marked on their finger with a purple, non-washable ink to prevent double voting. The 4000 bottles of ink were purchased through the United Nations Development Programme (UNDP) at a cost of $110,000. Transport costs were added to this.

== Parties and alliances ==
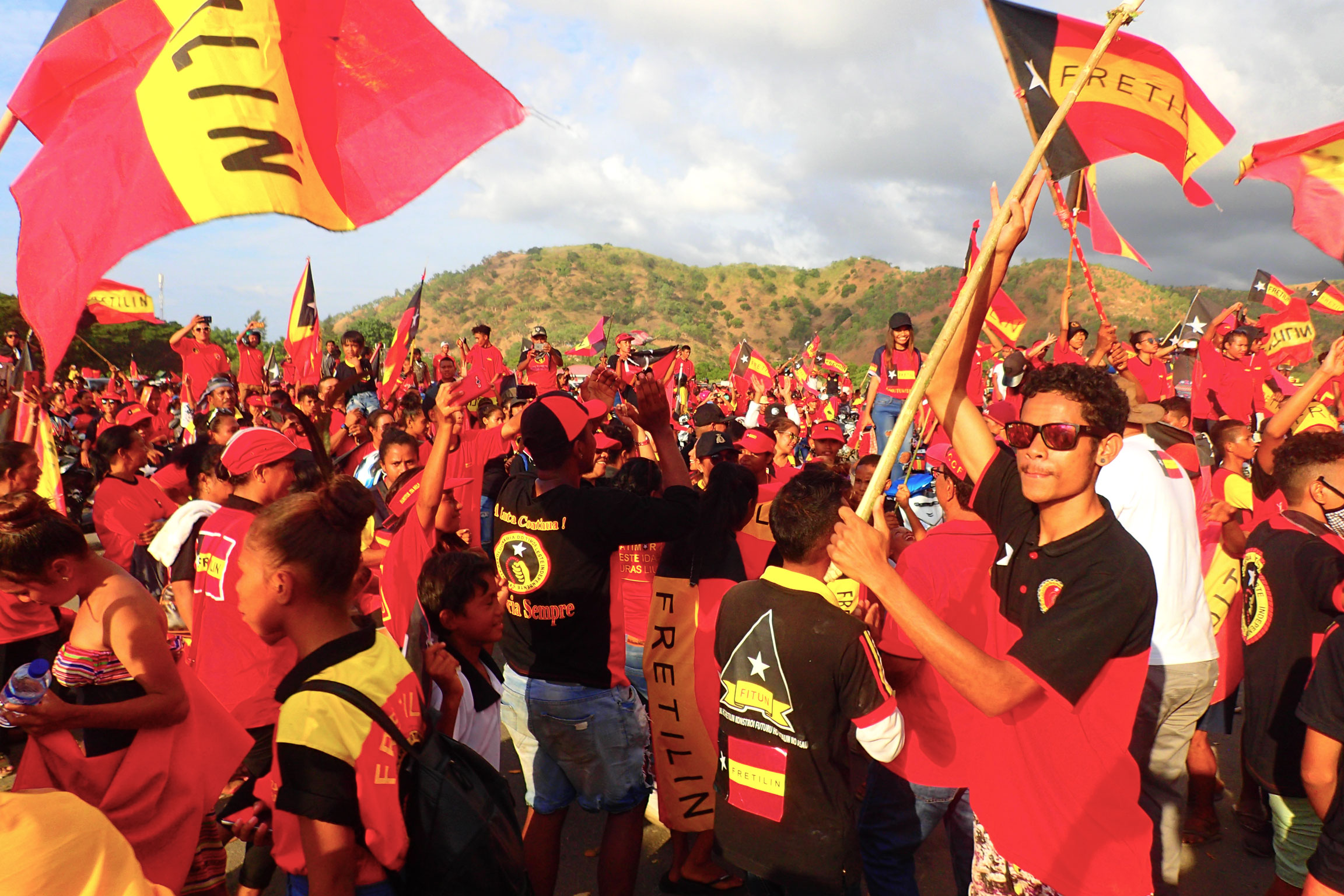
Fretilin election campaign event in Tasitolu

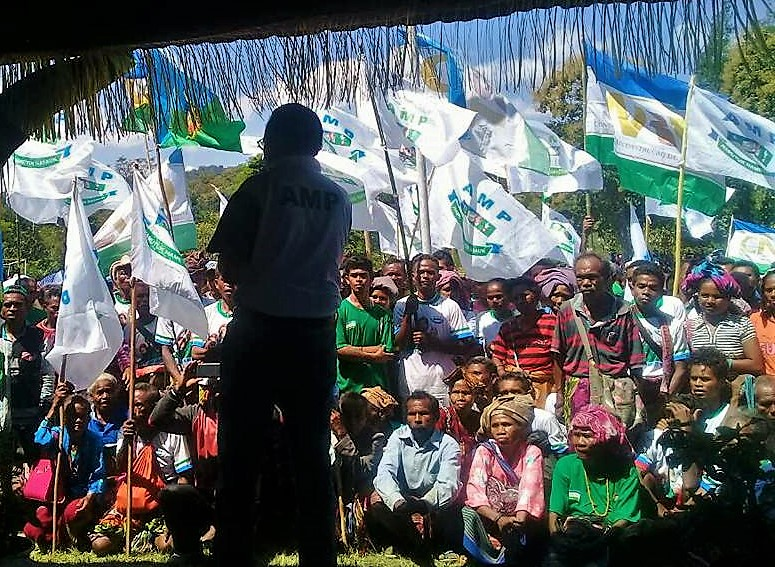
PLP leader, Taur Matan Ruak, at an AMP election rally in Oesilo

On 26 January the AMP and the Forum of National Democracy (FDN), an alliance (Portuguese: coligação) of several small parties that are not represented in parliament, concluded an agreement to unite the forces of the twelve parties in the upcoming elections. On 1 February 2018, the three parties of the AMP officially decided to work together in the election campaign as well. For this purpose, the alliance was renamed Alliance for Change and Progress. In a declaration of intent, it was agreed to contest the election with a joint list and to form a coalition after the election. Other forces, such as the FDN, would also be free to join the AMP. Fretilin and PD also agreed to cooperate in the election campaign. However, a joint list was ruled out by Alkatiri. With the Frenti Dezenvolvimentu Demokratiku (FDD), the parties Democratic Unity Development Party (PUDD), Frenti-Mudança (FM), Timorese Democratic Union (UDT) and Party of National Development (PDN) founded another alliance on 11 December 2017.

In March 2018 the FDN disintegrated. Parts of it formed the Social Democratic Movement (MSD), others the National Development Movement (MDN). Finally, the Comissão Nacional de Eleições announced that it would allow a total of four coalitions to stand for election: AMP, MSD, MDN and FDD. If the parties received the same number of votes in the new elections as in 2017, the AMP would get 33 seats and thus an absolute majority of seats. Fretilin would get 21 seats, the PD six and the FDD, whose members were not previously represented in parliament, a total of five seats. The other alliances would be below the four-percent hurdle even with a combined vote total.

In addition to the four party alliances, four parties contested the election: Fretilin and PD, the two governing parties previously represented in parliament, as well as Republican Party (PR) and Hope of the Fatherland Party (PEP). The list of candidates participating in the election had to be published on 1 January. The list of candidates participating in the election had to be confirmed by the Timor-Leste Supreme Court of Justice on 1 April. Appeals against the decision could still be lodged until 4 April. An appeal will be lodged in April. At the end of March, it was reported that the Klibur Oan Timor Asuwain (KOTA), which did not run in 2017, and the Timorese Social Democratic Association (ASDT), which was not allowed to run at the time, had registered. However, the two parties no longer appeared on the lists published on 3 April.

The parties remaining in the FDN, Democratic Republic of Timor-Leste Party PDRT, Millennium Democratic Party PMD (both formerly in the Bloku Unidade Popular BUP alliance) and People's Party of Development PDP, made an election appeal in favour of the AMP. The Timorese Democratic Party (PTD), which had run in 2017, also did not take part in the 2018 election. The registered parties People's Party of Timor (PPT), National Unity Party (PUN), Timor-Leste National Republic Party (PARENTIL), Timorese Labor Party (PTT), Liberal Party (PDL), and Timorese Nationalist Party (PNT) did not take part in 2017.

== Campaign ==
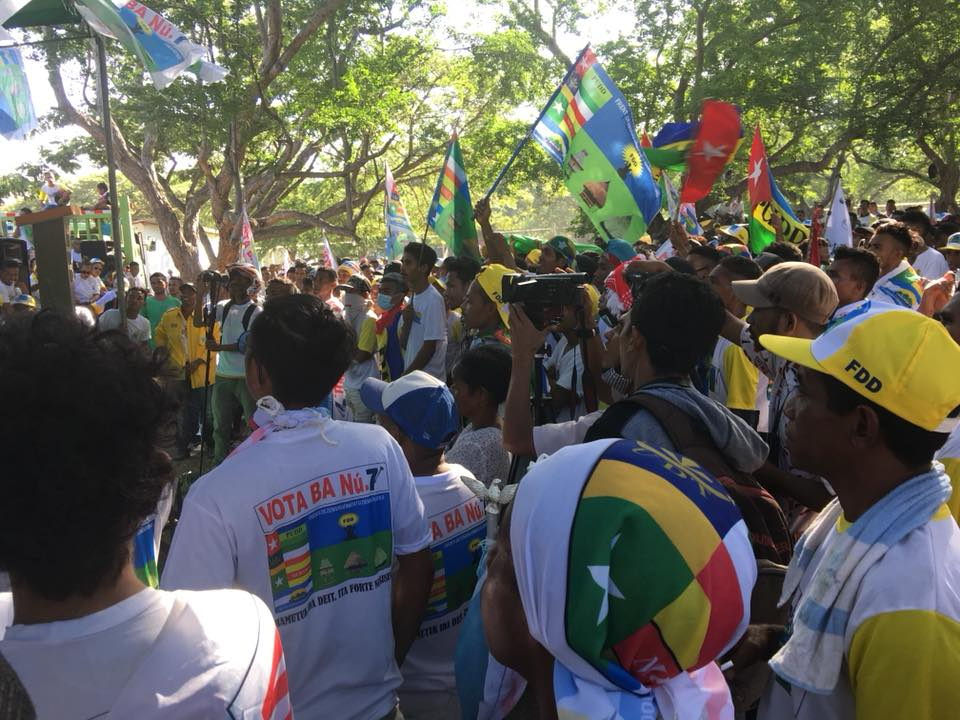
Election campaign event of the FDD in Tasitolu

On 9 April, the parties and alliances signed a "Pact of National Unity", committing themselves to peaceful elections. The hot phase of the election campaign officially began on 10 April and ended on 9 May. After that, no more election campaign events were allowed to take place. The mood in the election campaign was generally very charged. The importance of social networks, such as Facebook, over traditional media continued to increase compared to previous elections, but this led to problems. Information was spread as well as insults, defamation and threats against politicians and traditional leaders. In the run-up to the official election campaign, the police arrested several people accused of insulting politicians. However, East Timorese criminal law does not provide for consequences for defamation, so those arrested were released. The tone on social networks did not change. There was also criticism that even journalists were spreading false news via social networks and thus causing resentment in society.

On 5 May, two vehicles carrying 18 CNRT supporters were attacked in Viqueque, injuring several of the travellers. Marí Alkatiri apologized for the attack on behalf of Fretilin, but the NGO Fundasaun Mahein criticised the lack of measures to prevent such attacks. Moreover, the competition between the parties had been dominated by violent language, with party members commonly referred to as militants. In Laga, according to AMP reports, there were also attacks on their supporters. On the other hand, there were some anti-Muslim statements, which was directed against Alkatiri, who is of Hadhrami origin.

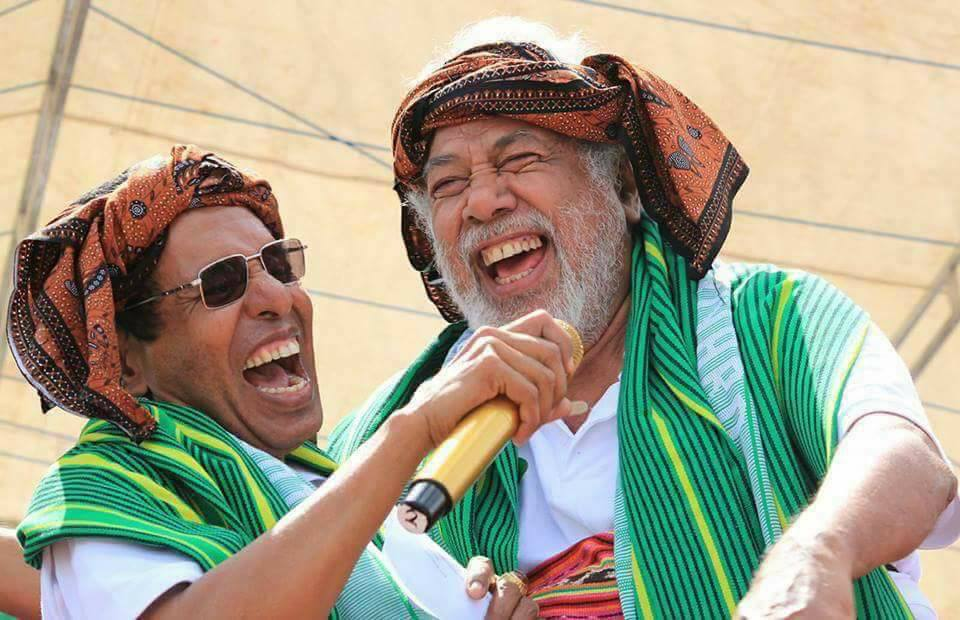
The two figureheads of the AMP at an election rally: Taur Matan Ruak and Xanana Gusmão

It was striking that the parties largely used figures from the independence struggle as figureheads for their campaigns. The AMP made special reference to the fact that its leaders Xanana Gusmão and Taur Matan Ruak came from the armed resistance in the country, while the Fretilin leaders Alkatiri and José Ramos-Horta spent the Indonesian occupation period (1975-1999) abroad on the "diplomatic front". The PD campaigned with its late founder Fernando de Araújo, who led the student independence movement in Indonesia (RENETIL), and the MSD with Mário Viegas Carrascalão and Francisco Xavier do Amaral, also deceased.

On 10 May, the President of the National Electoral Commission (Portuguese: Comissão Nacional de Eleições CNE) Alcino Baris accused the AMP of spreading unfounded suspicions against the official electoral bodies on social media. Two posts on the AMP's Facebook account had warned that Prime Minister Alkatiri was "preparing mechanisms to deal with the early elections" with the CNE and the Technical Secretariat of the Electoral Administration (Portuguese: Secretáriado Técnico de Administração Eleitoral STAE). The party claims that additional ballot papers were printed "to make Fretilin the winner" and they tried to buy votes with "money and rice". Then also claim that election officials were also manipulated. According to Baris, there is no evidence of this. Fidelis Leite Magalhães, Vice-President of the AMP, said the warnings had certain bases and were intended to avoid abuse and "deliberate mistakes". The first reports from national and international election observers assessed the elections as free, fair and transparent. Besides Australia and the European Union, election observers included the International Republican Institute, the Ibero-American Group of Electoral Observers GIOE with representatives from Brazil, Chile, Mexico, Portugal and Venezuela and the Catholic Church alone 900 people.

== Results ==
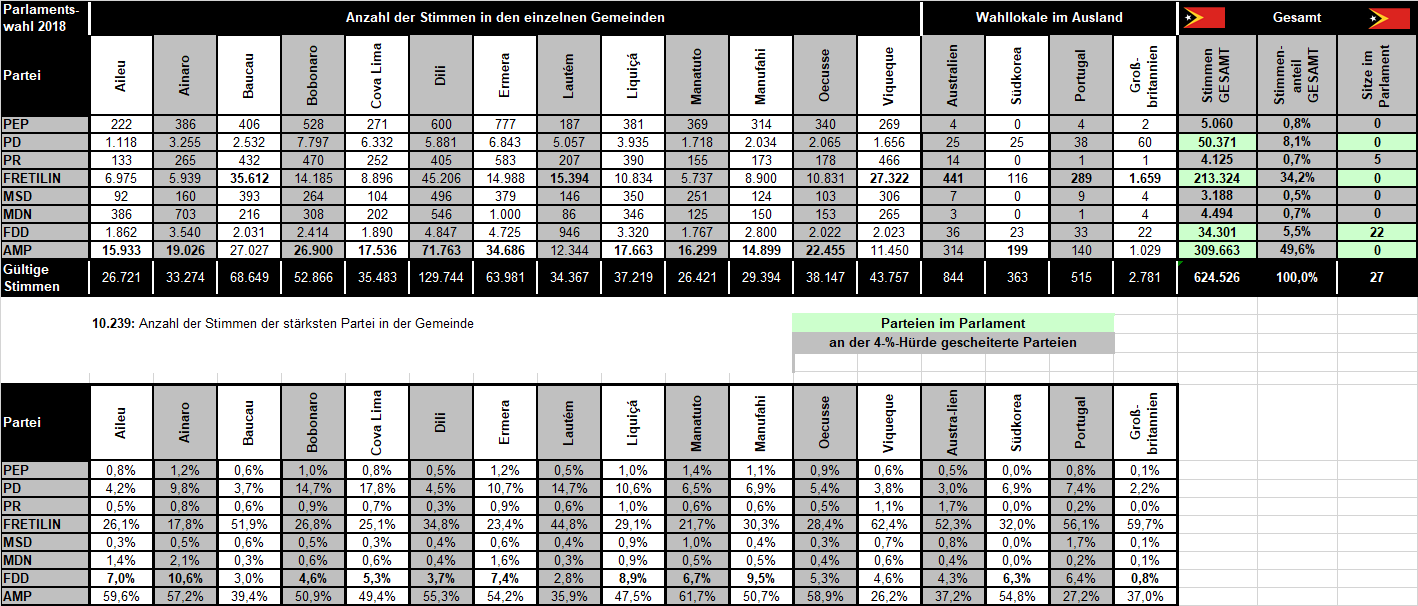
Result of the vote count by municipalities

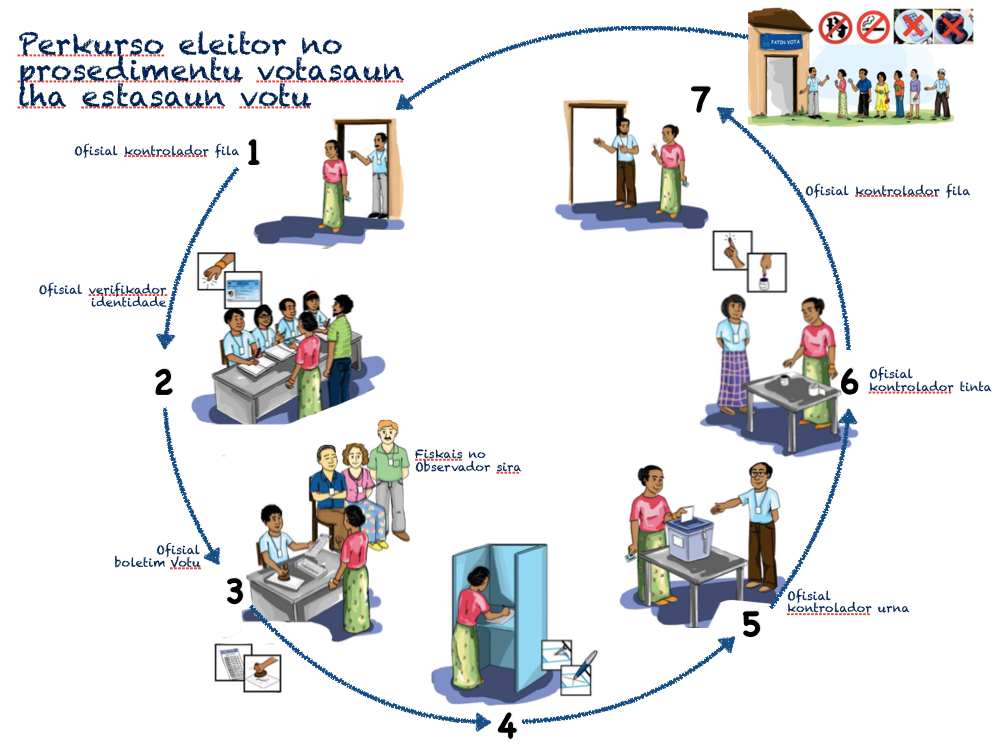
Voter information on correct behaviour at the polling station

Polling stations closed at 15:00. Voter turnout was 81%, 5% higher than in the previous elections. 326,272 of the votes cast were from men, 308,844 from women. According to the provisional official final results after 98% of the votes were counted, the AMP won an absolute majority in parliament with 34 of 65 seats. It had to give up one seat to the new FDD, which won two more seats from the PD. Fretilinwas able to maintain its number of seats. The AMP was able to win a majority in the municipalities, especially in the west. The Fretilin's second place behind the AMP in Oe-Cusse Ambeno was striking, for which the local Fretilin leader Arsénio Bano took personal responsibility and publicly apologised via Facebook, while doubts about the correctness of the result in Oe-Cusse Ambeno were heard from his party. Fretilin had lost almost 11% (more than 3,000 votes) here compared to the last elections, while AMP now had over 58% (+19%). In Dili, Fretilin made big gains and became the strongest party again in its old strongholds of Baucau, Viqueque and Lautém.

Party	Votes	%	Seats	+/–
Alliance for Change and Progress (CNRT–PLP–KHUNTO)	309,663	49.58	34	–1
Fretilin	213,324	34.16	23	0
Democratic Party	50,370	8.07	5	–2
Democratic Development Forum (PUDD–UDT–FM–PDN)	34,301	5.49	3	+3
Hope of the Fatherland Party	5,060	0.81	0	0
National Development Movement (APMT–PLPA–MLPM–UNDERTIM)	4,494	0.72	0	0
Republican Party	4,125	0.66	0	0
Social Democratic Movement (CASDT–PSD–PST–PDC)	3,188	0.51	0	0
Total	624,525	100.00	65	0
Valid votes	624,525	98.33		
Invalid/blank votes	10,591	1.67		
Total votes	635,116	100.00		
Registered voters/turnout	784,286	80.98		
Source: CNE

=== By municipality ===
Municipality	AMP	FRETILIN	PD	FDD	PEP	MDN	PR	MSD	Valid votes
Local votes
Aileu	15,933	6,975	1,118	1,862	222	386	133	92	26,721
Ainaro	19,026	5,939	3,255	3,540	386	703	265	160	33,274
Baucau	27,027	35,612	2,532	2,031	406	216	432	393	68,649
Bobonaro	26,900	14,185	7,797	2,414	528	308	470	264	52,866
Covalima	17,536	8,896	6,332	1,890	271	202	252	104	35,483
Dili	71,763	45,206	5,881	4,847	600	546	405	496	129,744
Ermera	34,686	14,988	6,843	4,725	777	1,000	583	379	63,981
Lautem	12,344	15,394	5,057	946	187	86	207	146	34,367
Liquica	17,663	10,834	3,935	3,320	381	346	390	350	37,219
Manatuto	16,299	5,737	1,718	1,767	369	125	155	251	26,421
Manufahi	14,899	8,900	2,034	2,800	314	150	173	124	29,394
Oecusse	22,455	10,831	2,065	2,022	340	153	178	103	38,147
Viqueque	11,450	27,322	1,655	2,023	269	265	466	306	43,756
Postal votes
Australia	314	441	25	36	4	3	14	7	844
South Korea	199	116	25	23	0	0	0	0	363
Portugal	140	289	38	33	4	1	1	9	515
UK	1,029	1,659	60	22	2	4	1	4	2,781
Total	309,663	213,324	50,370	34,301	5,060	4,494	4,125	3,188	624,525
Source: CNE

== Aftermath ==
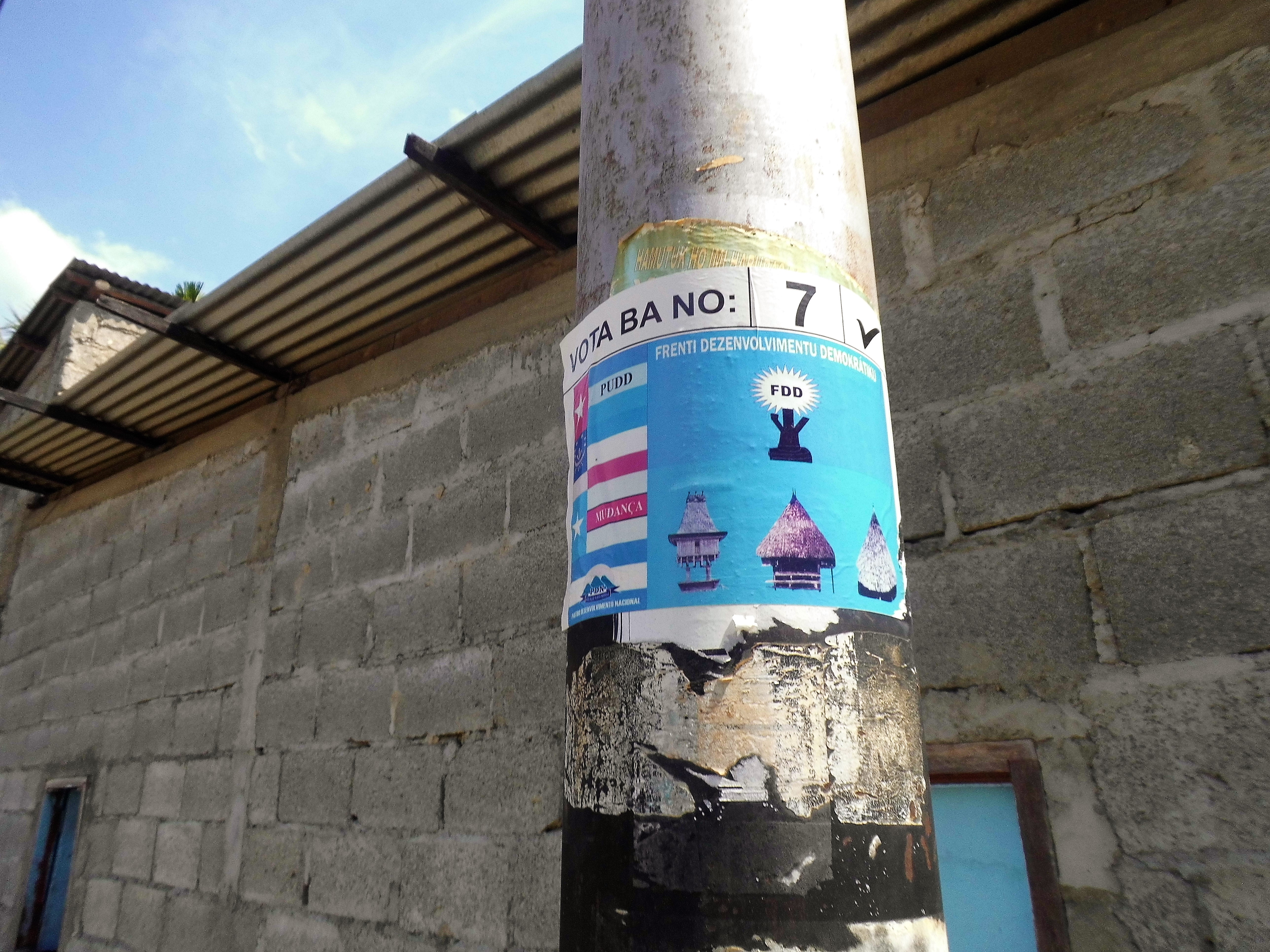
FDD election poster

The PD leadership declared on 15 May that it would accept the election result and would pursue constructive opposition Xanana Gusmão declared in a press conference on the same day that the AMP agreed to have the election results checked and countered suspicions of falsification from the ranks of Fretilin. Alkatiri expressed his suspicion that there were irregularities, particularly with regard to the result in Oe-Cusse Ambeno, which he wanted to have checked. Gusmão also spoke of "small errors", saying that in Dili there were differences in the number of votes between the vote count and the published result of the STAE. The CNE published the final, provisional result on 17 May.

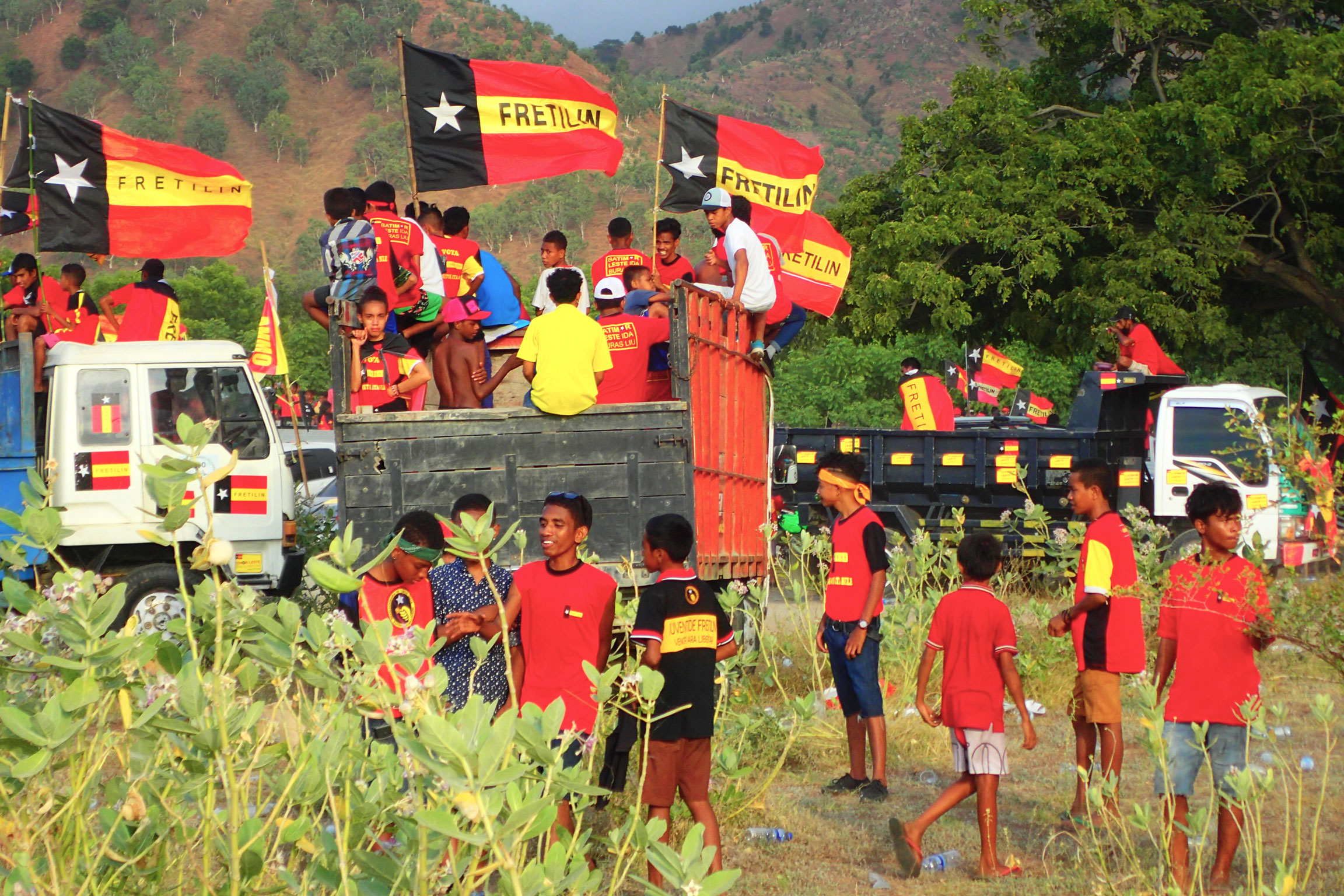
Fretilin supporters during the election campaign

On 19 May, Alkatiri announced that Fretilin was collecting evidence of "criminal electoral offences" to present to the Tribunal de Recurso, where the election results were being appealed. It said it already had several pieces of evidence from Oe-Cusse Ambeno where "cars with strangers" had been seen. However, they would accept any decision of the court. The allegations included vote buying, use of false papers, missing ballot papers at a polling centre and complaints about the counting of votes. On 22 May, the president of the tribunal, Deolindo dos Santos, requested further documents from the CNE. As these were missing for a judgement, the 72-hour deadline for a judgement had not yet expired. On 23 May, the court rejected Fretilin's complaint as "completely unfounded". and finally officially announced the final official result on 28 May, as scheduled in the electoral calendar in the Jornal da República. Since then, Fretilin had announced its intention to be a strong opposition to the AMP government.

On 1 June, the AMP nominated Taur Matan Ruak as its candidate for Prime Minister. The new parliament met for the first time on 13 June. Taur Matan Ruak was sworn in as Prime Minister on 22 June.
