= Alliance for Change and Progress =

Former East Timorese political alliance

Alliance for Change and Progress Aliansa Mudansa ba Progresu Aliança para Mudança e Progresso
- Abbreviation: AMP
- Leader: Xanana Gusmão; Taur Matan Ruak; José dos Santos Bucar
- Founded: 12 October 2017
- Dissolved: 25 May 2020
- Succeeded by: FRETILIN-PLP-KHUNTO alliance
- Ideology: (CNRT); Developmentalism (PLP); Youth unemployment (KHUNTO)
- Political position: Big tent
- Coalition members: CNRT; PLP; KHUNTO
- Slogan: Hametuk Hametin Nasaun
- National Parliament (2018): 34 / 65

The Alliance for Change and Progress (AMP) (Tetum: Aliansa Mudansa ba Progresu, Portuguese: Aliança para Mudança e Progresso) was a three-party alliance in East Timor. Until 1 February 2018, the alliance was called Parliamentary Majority Alliance (Tetum: Aliansa Maioria Parlamentar, Portuguese: Aliança da Maioria Parlamentar). The motto of the coalition was "Hamutuk Hametin Nasaun" (English: Strengthen the nation together). The flag of the AMP showed the flags of the three member parties on a white background.

== History ==
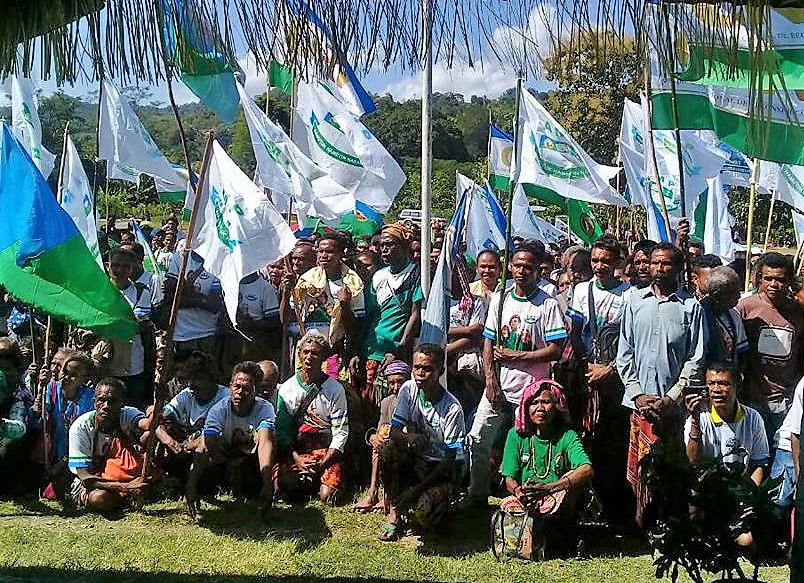
AMP campaign event in Oesilo (2018)

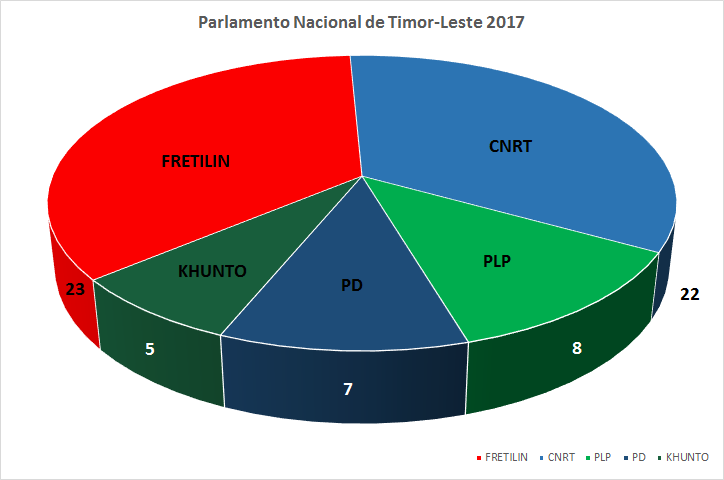
Allocation of seats in East Timor's national parliament after the 2017 parliamentary election

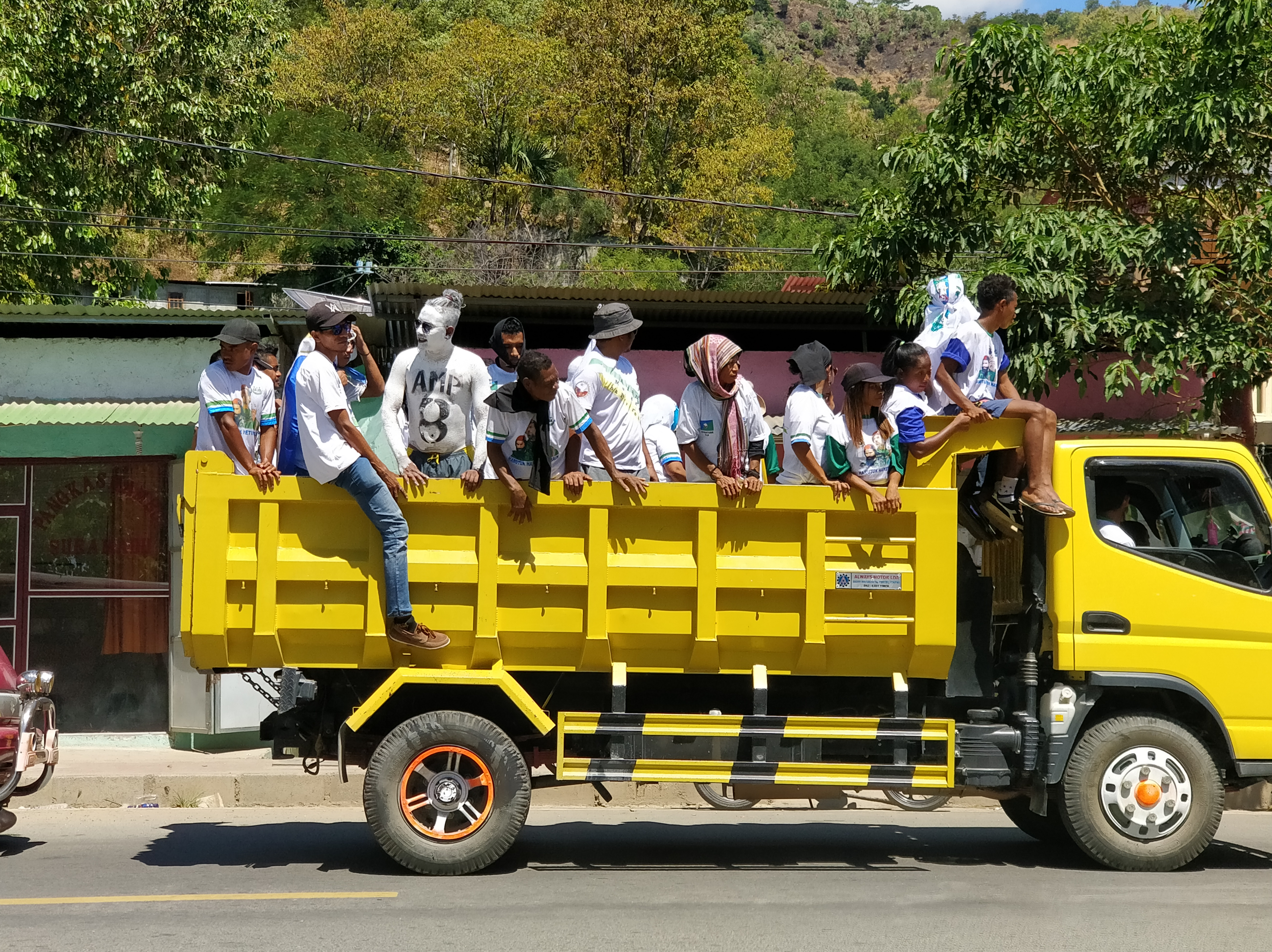
AMP members at a truck parade through Dili

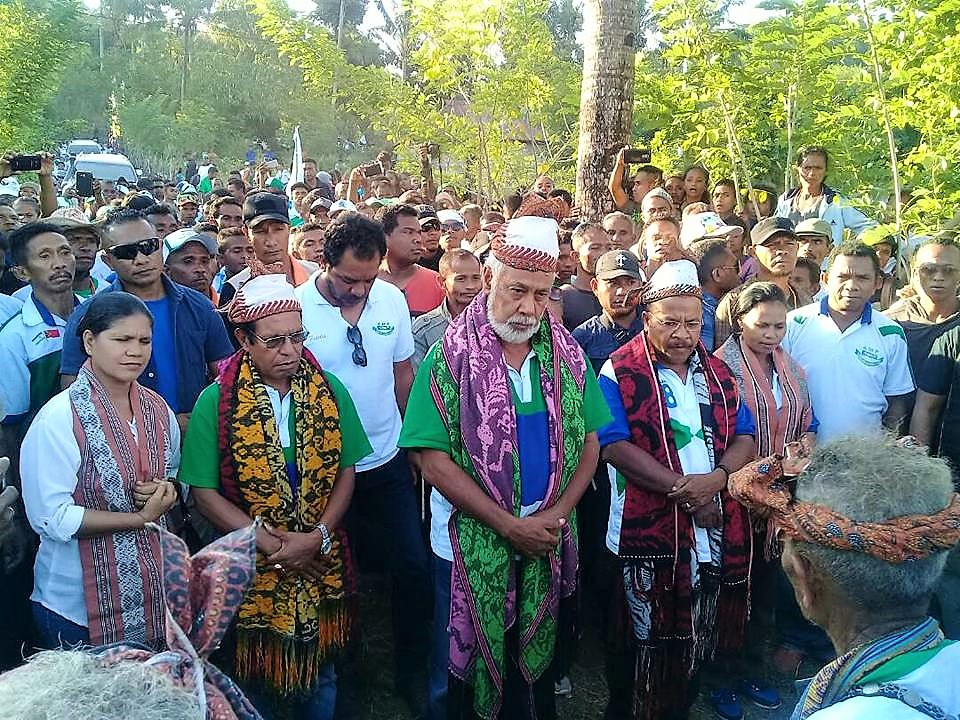
The AMP frontrunners 2018: Left Taur Matan Ruak (PLP), middle Xanana Gusmão (CNRT), right José dos Santos Bucar (KHUNTO)

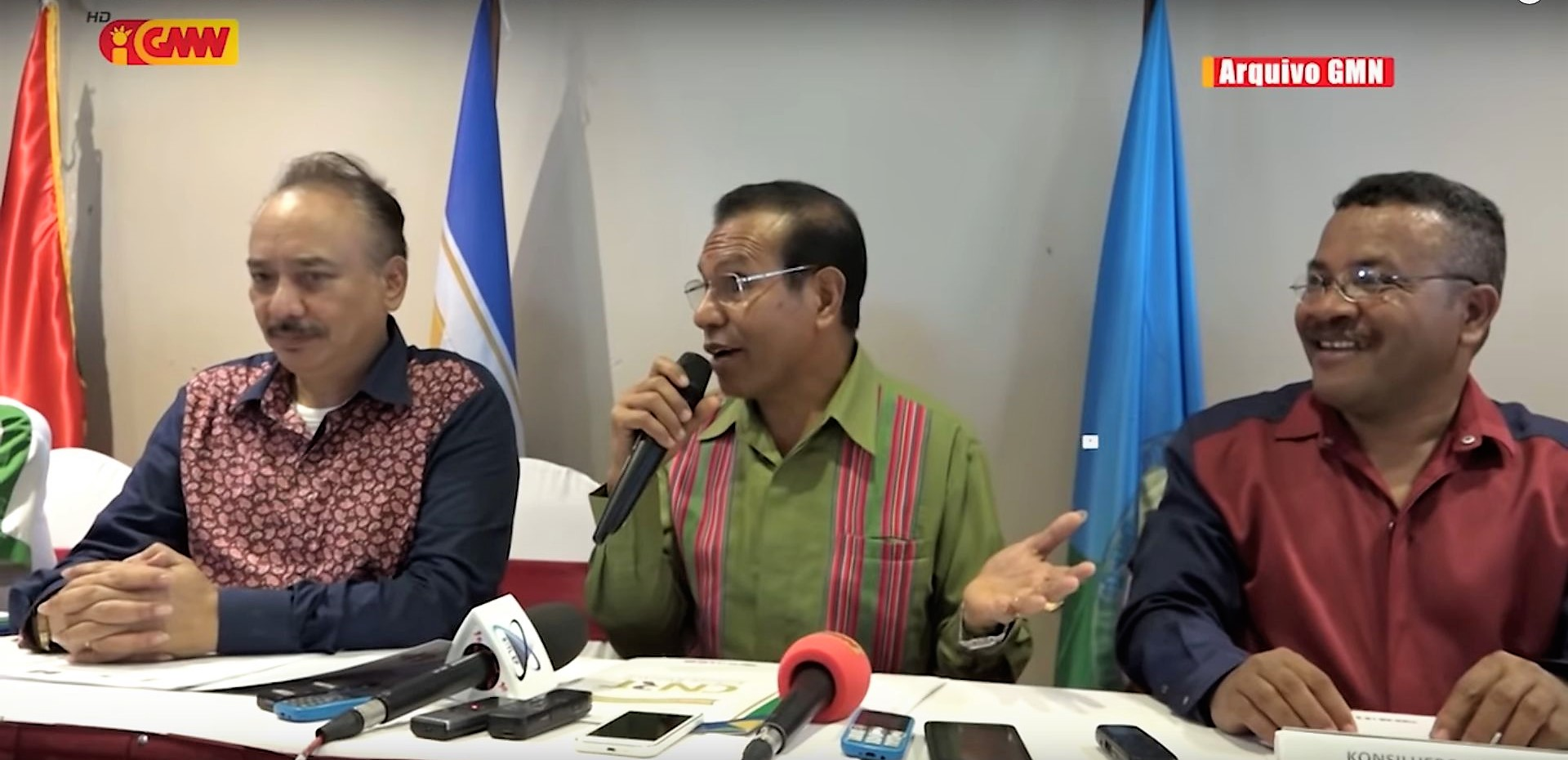
Kalbuadi (CNRT), Taur Matan Ruak (PLP) and Bucar (KHUNTO)

In the 2017 East Timorese parliamentary election, FRETILIN won 23 seats in East Timor's national parliament, CNRT - 22 seats, PLP - 8 seats, PD - 7 seats and KHUNTO - 5 seats.

The talks about a grand coalition between FRETILIN and CNRT failed and the KHUNTO withdrew from the desired governing coalition of FRETILIN, PD and KHUNTO at the last moment, so that a minority government of FRETILIN and PD under Marí Alkatiri was formed mid-September.

On 6 October, the 35 MPs from CNRT, PLP and KHUNTO sent a letter to President Francisco Guterres declaring their willingness to "offer an alternative solution for a government" if the government fails to get their program through Parliament. to ensure "peace, stability and development". Guterres has been criticized for recognizing a minority government instead of "looking for a solution that would have allowed for a majority government". FRETILIN failed to create a consensus between the parties in order to be able to implement the program and state budget.

On 8 October, the three opposition parties declared the creation of the "Parliamentary Majority Oppositional Alliance" bloc. (Tetum: Aliansa Opozisaun Maioria Parlamentar AOMP), with which they want to control the work of the government. On 12 October, CNRT, PLP and KHUNTO officially signed an agreement to form the Parliamentary Majority Alliance.

On 19 October, the majority of the opposition rejected the government program presented by Alkatiri. The government now had to present a new program. It didn't come to that anymore. Instead, on January 26, 2018, President Guterres decided to dissolve parliament. The date for new elections is expected in April.

On 1 February 2018, the three parties of the AMP decided to work together in the election campaign. For this, the alliance was renamed Aliança para Mudança e Progresso. In a declaration of intent, it was agreed to contest the election with a joint list and to form a coalition after the election. Other forces such as the Democratic National Forum (FDN) are also free to join the AMP.

In the 2018 East Timorese parliamentary election, the AMP managed to win 34 of the 65 seats and thus an absolute majority in parliament with a share of 49.6% (309,663 votes). PLP leader Taur Matan Ruak was sworn in as Prime Minister on 22 June 2018, and now leads the VIII Constitutional Government of East Timor.

In late 2019, CNRT MPs increasingly blamed Prime Minister Taur Matan Ruak for the fact that the majority of CNRT ministers were still out of office after 18 months, as President Guterres blocked their swearing-in. The slow progress on the Tasi Mane project also caused a dispute between the PLP and CNRT. On 17 January 2020, the government proposal for the 2020 budget failed again in parliament. Only the 13 MPs from PLP and KHUNTO voted for the draft. Fifteen opposition MPs voted against it, while CNRT coalition MPs and the rest of the opposition abstained. Taur Matan Ruak then declared the end of the AMP. However, President Guterres waived his right to dissolve parliament and call new elections. Instead, he put Taur Matan Ruak in charge of continuing the government.

== See also ==
- VII Constitutional Government of East Timor
