= 2028 East Timorese parliamentary election =

- by May 2028

All 65 seats in the National Parliament 33 seats needed for a majority
Incumbent Prime Minister
Xanana Gusmão
CNRT

Parliamentary elections are scheduled to be held in Timor-Leste by May 2028.

== Electoral system ==
The 65 members of the National Parliament are elected from a single nationwide constituency by closed list proportional representation. Parties are required to have a woman in at least every third position in their list. Seats are allocated using the d'Hondt method with an electoral threshold of four percent and with the last seat, in the case of several equal maximum numbers, being awarded to the party with the fewest votes. In order to jump the four per cent hurdle (about 26,000 voters), parties can form electoral alliances.
