= Maria Fernanda Lay =

East Timorese politician

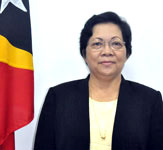

President of the National Parliament
- Incumbent
- Assumed office 22 June 2023
- Preceded by: Aniceto Guterres Lopes

Member of the National Parliament of Timor-Leste
- Incumbent
- Assumed office August 6, 2007

Personal details
- Born: 1954 (age 71–72) Baucau, Portuguese Timor
- Party: CNRT

Maria Fernanda Lay (born 1954) is a politician in Timor-Leste. She has been a member of the National Parliament of Timor-Leste since 2007. In 2023, she was elected as president of the National Parliament, becoming the first woman to lead the body.

== Early life and education ==
Maria Fernanda Lay was born in 1954 in Baucau, Portuguese Timor. She holds a bachelor's degree from a telecommunications school in Bandung, Indonesia.

== Career ==
While Indonesia still occupied Timor-Leste, Lay worked as a manager at Timor Telekom. She later worked as a project manager for the U.S. Agency for International Development.

Lay subsequently pursued a political career as a member of the National Congress for Timorese Reconstruction (CNRT) party. She first gained a seat in the National Parliament of Timor-Leste in the 2007 elections, taking office on August 6, 2007. In her time in Parliament, she has served in leadership roles on various commissions.

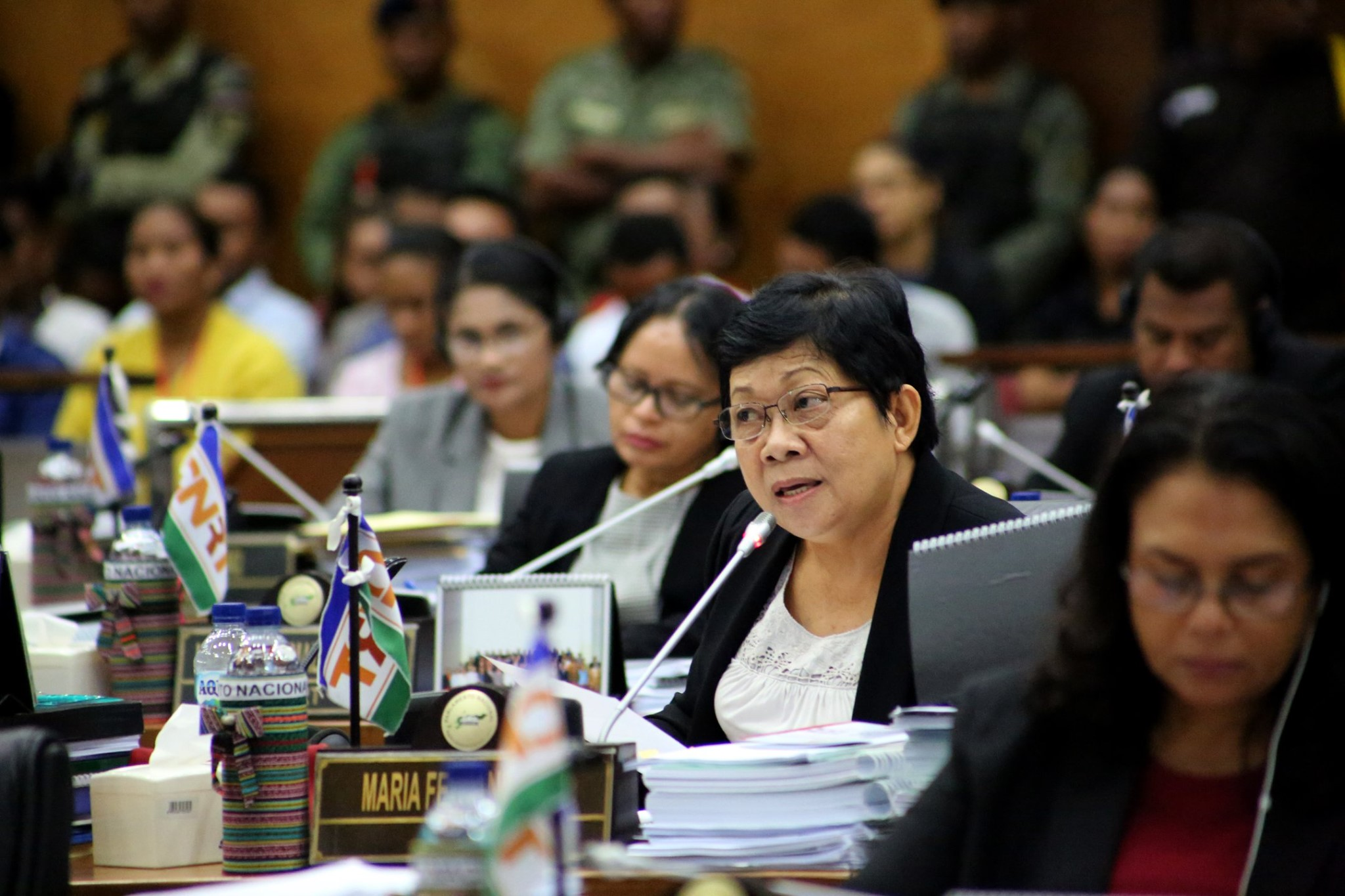
Maria Fernanda Lay in Parliament.

Since 2010, she has served as secretary of her national group at the Parliamentary Assembly of the Community of Portuguese Language Countries. She also led the body's Women's Network from 2010 to 2015.

On June 17, 2020, Lay made headlines for her involvement in a verbal and physical fight on the floor of the National Parliament with fellow legislator Olinda Guterres. After Lay spoke Portuguese during a debate, Guterres criticized her and argued she should instead have spoken in Tetum, a more commonly spoken language in Timor-Leste.

Lay pointed out that the Constitution designates Portuguese as an official language of Timor-Leste. She criticized Guterres in turn for allegedly having made racist comments, saying that the rival lawmaker had called her a china pirata ("Chinese pirate"). The two began physically fighting, and they had to be separated by other legislators.

On June 22, 2023, she was elected president of the National Parliament by a vote of 45–0, with 19 abstentions and one blank ballot. She is the first woman to be elected as speaker of the body. On occasions when the president is away on international diplomatic visits or otherwise absent, Lay will be the first woman to assume the functions of the presidency on a temporary basis.
