= Oesilo =

Coordinates: 9°22′S 124°21′E

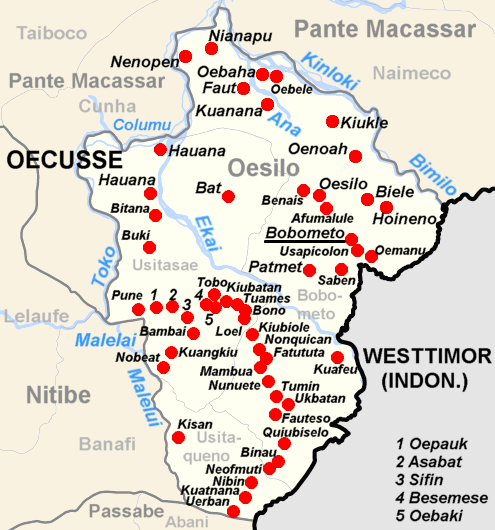
Map of Oecusse with Oesilo marked in red on the Northwest

Oesilo is a small town (Suco Bobometo, Oesilo subdistrict) in the Timor-Leste exclave of Oecusse. It is located in the southeast of the exclave, close to the border with Indonesia.
