= Aniceto Guterres Lopes =

East Timorese politician and human rights lawyer

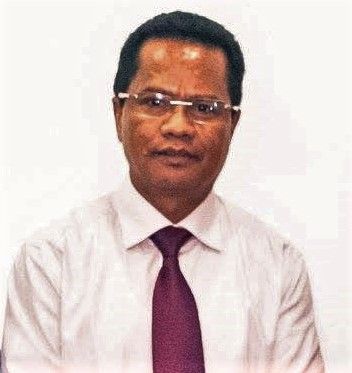
- Aniceto Guterres Lopes in 2017

President of the National Parliament
- In office 19 May 2020 – 22 June 2023
- Preceded by: Arão Noé da Costa Amaral
- Succeeded by: Maria Fernanda Lay
- In office 5 September 2017 – 2018
- Preceded by: Adérito Hugo da Costa
- Succeeded by: Arão Noé da Costa Amaral

Personal details
- Born: 16 April 1967 (age 58) Maliana, Bobonaro, Portuguese Timor
- Party: Fretilin
- Occupation: lawyer

Aniceto Guterres Lopes (born April 16, 1967, in Tapo, East Timor) is an East Timorese politician and human rights lawyer.

== Early life ==
On December 7, 1975, Lopes and his family fled the country to Builalu, Indonesia, to escape from the Indonesian troops that invaded East Timor. Upon their return to East Timor a year later, the Lopes family discovered their village of Tapo was destroyed, and moved to Maliana.

== Education ==
In 1985, Lopes studied law at the Udayana University in Bali, after obtaining a scholarship from the governor of East Timor.

== Politics ==
While studying in Indonesia, Lopes joined the National Resistance of East Timorese Students (Portuguese: Resistência Nacional dos Estudantes de Timor-Leste (RENETIL)) in 1989. Lopes was in charge of relaying political information to and from East Timor and other parts of the world.

== Career ==
After moving back to East Timor in 1991, Lopes worked for an NGO in Dili.

From 1992 to 1996, Lopes served as the secretary general of the East Timor Agriculture and Development Foundation (ETADEF).

Lopes began his law practice in 1996 by starting a law firm in East Timor where he represented clients in cases where human rights were violated.

=== Yayasan HAK ===
Lopes co-founded the Human Rights and Justice Foundation (Yayasan Hukum, Hak Asasi dan Keadilan, abbreviated as Yayasan HAK) in 1997, when East Timor was still ruled by Indonesian armed forces. The organization offers legal services to human rights victims, and records violations of human rights. Lopes led Yayasan HAK from 1997 to 2002.

=== United Nations ===
At a special session of the United Nations Human Rights Council in 1999, Lopes spoke about the problems he and other East Timorese were encountering during Indonesia's occupation of East Timor. Lopes explained that Indonesian supported militia destroyed his home and office in September 1999. Lopes mentioned that he had also been receiving death threats because of his position as a human rights lawyer. Lopes was sworn in as a member of the UN Transitional Administration in East Timor's Transitional Judicial Service Commission in 2002.

=== Truth commission work ===
Lopes was named as a commissioner of the Commission for Reception, Truth and Reconciliation in East Timor (CAVR) in 2002, during the UNTAET administration, and elected as chair of the commission. The commission lasted until 2005 and looked into cases of human rights abuse that occurred during the invasion of East Timor. He also served as a commissioner on the Indonesia–Timor Leste Commission of Truth and Friendship.

=== Political career ===
Lopes is a member of FRETLIN, one of East Timor's major political parties. He was first elected in 2002 and would become his party's parliamentary leader. In 2017–18, when FRETILIN was in government, he was president of the National Parliament.

== Accolades ==
In 2001, Lopes was named as a fellow of the Ashoka Innovators of the Public. Lopes was also awarded the 2003 Ramon Magsaysay Award of Emergent Leadership, for his courageous stand for justice.

Political offices
Preceded by Adérito Hugo da Costa	President of the National Parliament; 2017–2018	Succeeded by Arão Noé da Costa Amaral
