= KHUNTO =

Kmanek Haburas Unidade Nasional Timor Oan
- Abbreviation: KHUNTO
- Leader: José dos Santos Bucar
- President: Armanda Berta dos Santos
- Secretary: Mário do Rosário Mesquita
- Founded: 22 June 2011 (officially registered)
- Headquarters: Manleuana, Dili, Timor-Leste
- Ideology: Unemployed youth interests Anti-corruption; Traditional Timorese spirituality
- Slogan: Tane ó rai, tane ó emar, no tane ó lisan "Support your country, your people, and your traditions"
- National Parliament: 5 / 65

Party flag
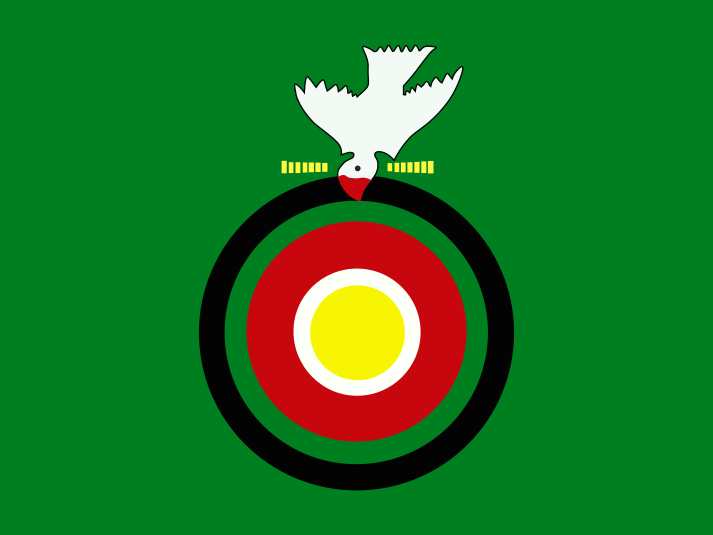

Website
- khunto.org.tl

Kmanek Haburas Unidade Nasional Timor Oan (KHUNTO; lit. 'Enrich the National Unity of the People of Timor') is a political party in Timor-Leste. KHUNTO is affiliated with the Kmanek Oan Rai Klaran (KORK) martial arts group, and has a largely rural, young membership base that consists of various martial arts groups throughout Timor-Leste. Since the 2023 parliamentary election, the party holds five seats in the National Parliament.

== Name and symbols ==
The name "Kmanek Haburas Unidade Nasional Timor Oan" in Tetun can be translated as "Flourishing of Timorese National Unity", "Enrich the National Unity of the People of Timor", or "Enrich the National Unity of the Sons of Timor". Some English-language sources translate Timor oan literally as "sons of Timor"; however, in Tetun the phrase refers not just to children but to Timorese people in general.

KHUNTO is associated with the color green, which it uses in its flag, promotional materials, and campaigning. The party's logo and flag feature a dove descending into a circle with rings of black, green, red, and white, with a yellow center.

== History ==
KHUNTO was officially registered on 22 June 2011 and is affiliated with the martial arts group KORK. In the 2012 parliamentary elections it received 2.97% of the vote, narrowly failing to cross the electoral threshold of 3%. However, in the 2017 parliamentary elections the party's vote share increased to 6.43% and it won five seats in the National Parliament. In the 2023 parliamentary elections the party's vote share further increased to 7.51% and it again won five seats in the National Parliament.

On 4 July 2021, KHUNTO celebrated its tenth anniversary and inaugurated its new national headquarters in Manleuana, Dili.

On 20–21 April 2024, KHUNTO held its fourth national congress, attended by 880 party members and officials. At the congress, Armanda Berta dos Santos was re-elected as the party's president.

== Ideology ==
KHUNTO's central philosophical principle is "Support your country, your people, and your traditions" (Tetun: Tane ó rai, tane ó emar, no tane ó lisan).

KHUNTO has made combating corruption the focus of its program. The party combines the democratic system with traditional Timorese beliefs as interpreted by ritual arts and martial arts groups in recent years. Although almost all East Timorese profess the Catholic faith, these ideas are widespread. Voters declare their loyalty to the party with a "blood oath" (juramento). According to belief, if it is not kept, the oath-breaker faces misfortune, illness and death. Conversely, the politicians are obliged by the oath of their electorate to help them with problems and not to enrich themselves through political offices. The details of the implementation of political goals are less relevant for the electorate than the trust that is placed in the KHUNTO members. In the event of a government takeover, the party aims to have state officials also swear a juramento, so that they would fear punishment by supernatural forces in the event of corruption. KHUNTO followers do not see the customary oath on the Bible as being very effective, because according to Christian belief, punishment for misconduct only occurs after death in the afterlife.

The binding of the voters through the oath seems only partially successful. According to a party leader, 89,000 voters passed the juramento ahead of the 2017 general election, but KHUNTO received only 36,547 votes. On the one hand, the votes came from the ranks of unemployed young people who see no prospects and are often supporters of the various martial arts groups, but the majority of the votes came from the rural regions of the country.

== Organization and structure ==
The highest authority in KHUNTO is the party's supreme leader, under whom serves a president, five vice presidents, a secretary-general, and five vice secretaries-general. The president, vice presidents, secretary-general, and vice secretaries-general are elected positions with four-year terms. There are also a number of national councilors, three treasurers, and a financial council (Tetun: Konsellu Juridisaun Verifikasaun Konta).

Since KHUNTO's founding, José dos Santos "Naimori" Bucar has been the party's supreme leader, and his wife, Armanda Berta dos Santos, has held the office of president. KHUNTO's current leadership structure, serving for the period of 2024-2028, were elected at the party's fourth national congress in 2024. The party's vice presidents, in order of seniority, are: Nicolau Lino Freitas Belo, Pedro dos Reis, Juvinal dos Santos, Ivo Lay Kolimau, and Odete Bilou. The secretary-general is Elídio de Araújo and the vice secretaries-general, in order of seniority, are: Zéto, Julião da Silva, Teodoro, and Mesale Benito.

KHUNTO is closely linked with the martial arts group Kmanek Oan Rai Klaran (KORK), from which it draws many supporters. José dos Santos "Naimori" Bucar, the party's supreme leader, is also the leader of KORK. The party also has subsidiary organizations for youth and women.

== Election results ==
In the parliamentary elections of 2012, the KHUNTO failed with 13,998 votes (2.97%) at the three percent hurdle as the country's fifth strongest party. In its stronghold Ainaro it received votes that corresponded to a share of 5.09%; in Manatuto with 1,085 votes or 5.33%. KHUNTO also received over 3% in the municipalities of Aileu (3.95%), Baucau (3.08%), Bobonaro (3.17%), Ermera (3.05%), Lautém (3.01%) and Liquiçá (3.19%).

In the parliamentary elections in East Timor in 2017, KHUNTO was the smallest party to enter parliament with 6.43% of the votes. and resulting in five seats.

In the parliamentary elections on May 12, 2018, the AMP coalition managed to win 34 of the 65 seats and thus an absolute majority in parliament with a share of 49.6% (309,663 votes).

=== Presidential elections ===
Election	Candidate	First round		Second round		Outcome
Election	Candidate	Votes	Percentage	Votes	Percentage	Outcome
2022	Armanda Berta dos Santos	56,690	8.70%	—N/a	—N/a	Lost ✗

=== Parliamentary elections ===
Election	Party leader	Votes	Percentage	Vote swing	Seats won	Change	Position	Outcome
2012	Armanda Berta dos Santos	13,998	2.97%	New	0 / 65	New	5th	Extra-parliamentary
2017	Armanda Berta dos Santos	36,547	6.43%	▲3.46%	5 / 65	▲5	5th	Opposition
2018	Armanda Berta dos Santos	Part of AMP			5 / 65	0	▲4th	Coalition
2023	Armanda Berta dos Santos	52,031	7.51%	▲1.08%	5 / 65	0	4th	Opposition

== Gallery ==
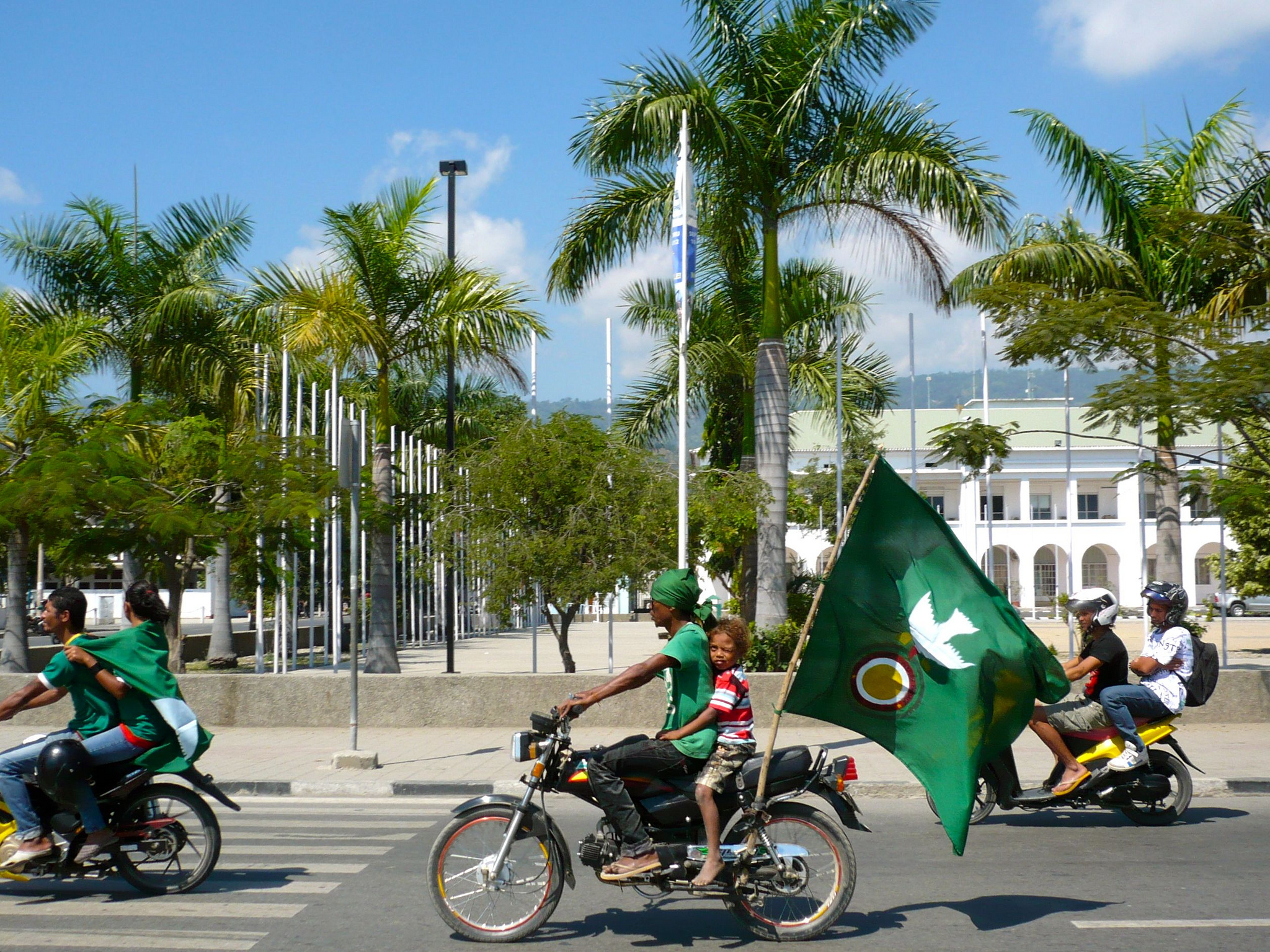
Supporters of KHUNTO campaigning on motorcycles during the 2012 parliamentary elections.

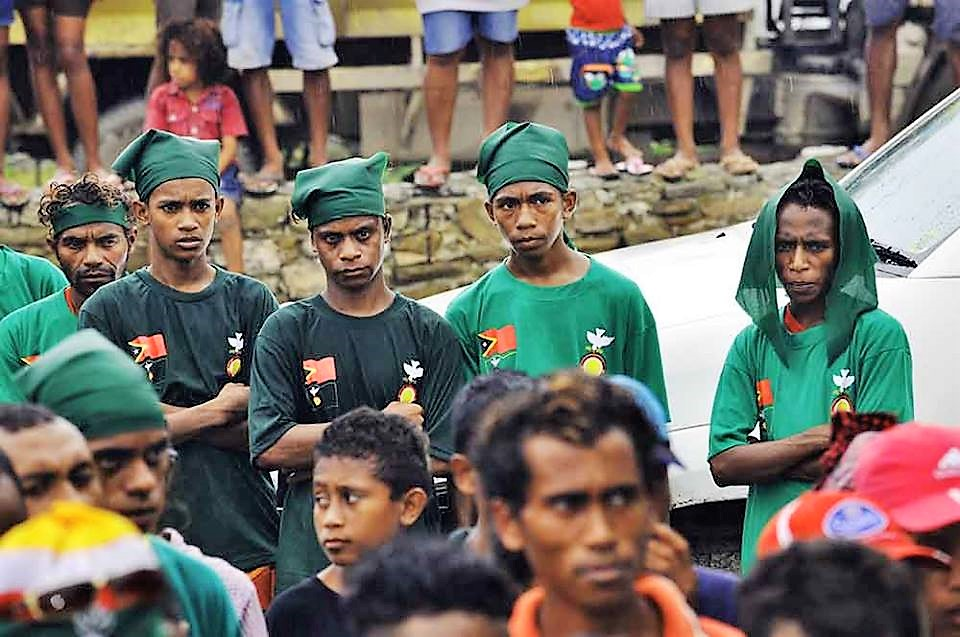
KHUNTO supporters at a 2017 election campaign organized by António da Conceição in Maliana.
