= People's Liberation Party (Timor-Leste) =

People's Liberation Party Partidu Libertasaun Popular
- Abbreviation: PLP
- President: Taur Matan Ruak
- Founder: Adérito de Jesus Soares
- Founded: 22 December 2015 (officially recognized by the Supreme Court)
- Headquarters: Caicoli, Dili, Timor-Leste
- Ideology: Developmentalism; Fiscal conservatism
- Political position: Centre
- Colours: Green; Light blue
- National Parliament: 4 / 65

Party flag

Website
- plp.org.tl

The People's Liberation Party (Tetum: Partidu Libertasaun Popular; abbreviated PLP) is a political party in Timor-Leste (formerly East Timor). The party is led by former East Timorese president Taur Matan Ruak, who became the PLP's leader in 2017.

== History ==
On 9 December 2015, the PLP submitted 35,000 signatures from its supporters to the East Timorese Supreme Court, to be officially recognized as a political party. On 22 December 2015, the Supreme Court accepted their request and officially recognized the party. In 2015, it was reported that then East Timorese president Taur Matan Ruak planned on becoming the leader of the PLP after he finished his term in office. In 2017, Taur Matan Ruak became the PLP's leader, replacing Adérito de Jesus Soares.

== Election results ==
=== Legislative elections ===
Election	Party leader	Votes	%	Seats	+/–	Position	Status
2017	Taur Matan Ruak	60,098	10.58%	8 / 65	New	▲3rd	Opposition
2018 (Note: Run as part of the Alliance for Change and Progress.)	Taur Matan Ruak	309,663	49.58%	8 / 65	0	▲1st	Coalition
2023	Taur Matan Ruak	40,720	5.88%	4 / 65	▼4	▼5th	Opposition

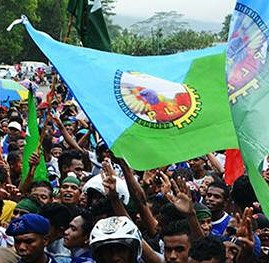
Supporters of the party with the party flag
