= National Parliament of Timor-Leste =

Legislature of Timor-Leste

Coordinates: 8°33′17″S 125°34′43″E

National Parliament Parlamentu Nasionál (Tetum) Parlamento Nacional (Portuguese)
- 6th National Parliament
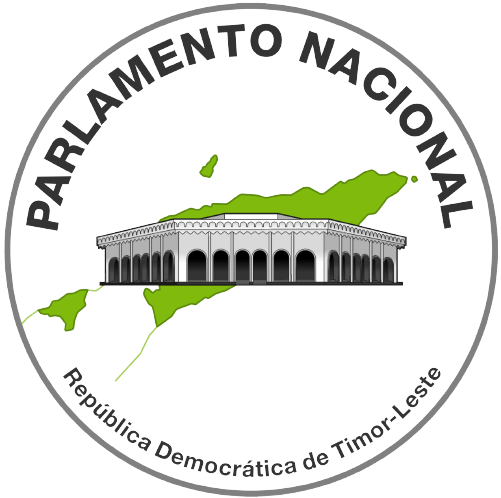

Type
- Type: Unicameral

History
- Founded: 20 May 2002
- Preceded by: National Council

Leadership
- President: Maria Fernanda Lay (CNRT) since 22 June 2023
- Vice-Presidents: Maria Terezinha Viegas (CNRT); Alexandrino Afonso Nunes (PD)

Structure
- Seats: 65
- Political groups: Government (37): CNRT (31); PD (6); Opposition (28): FRETILIN (19); KHUNTO (5); PLP (4)
- Length of term: 5 years
- Authority: Title III, Part III, Constitution of Timor-Leste

Elections
- Voting system: Party-list proportional representation D'Hondt method Closed list
- First election: 30 June 2007
- Last election: 21 May 2023
- Next election: 2028

Meeting place
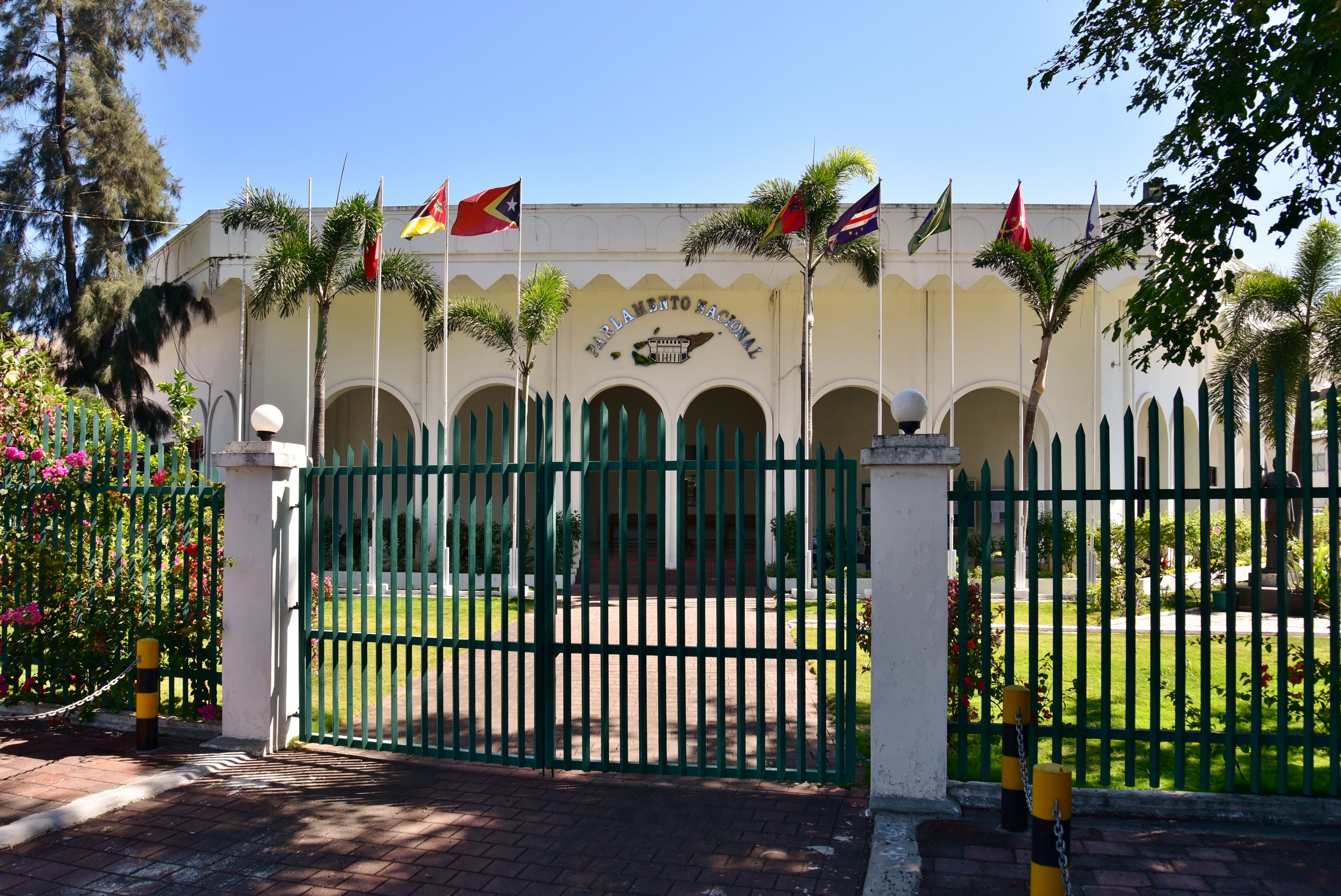
- Parlamento Nacional; Dili, Democratic Republic of Timor-Leste
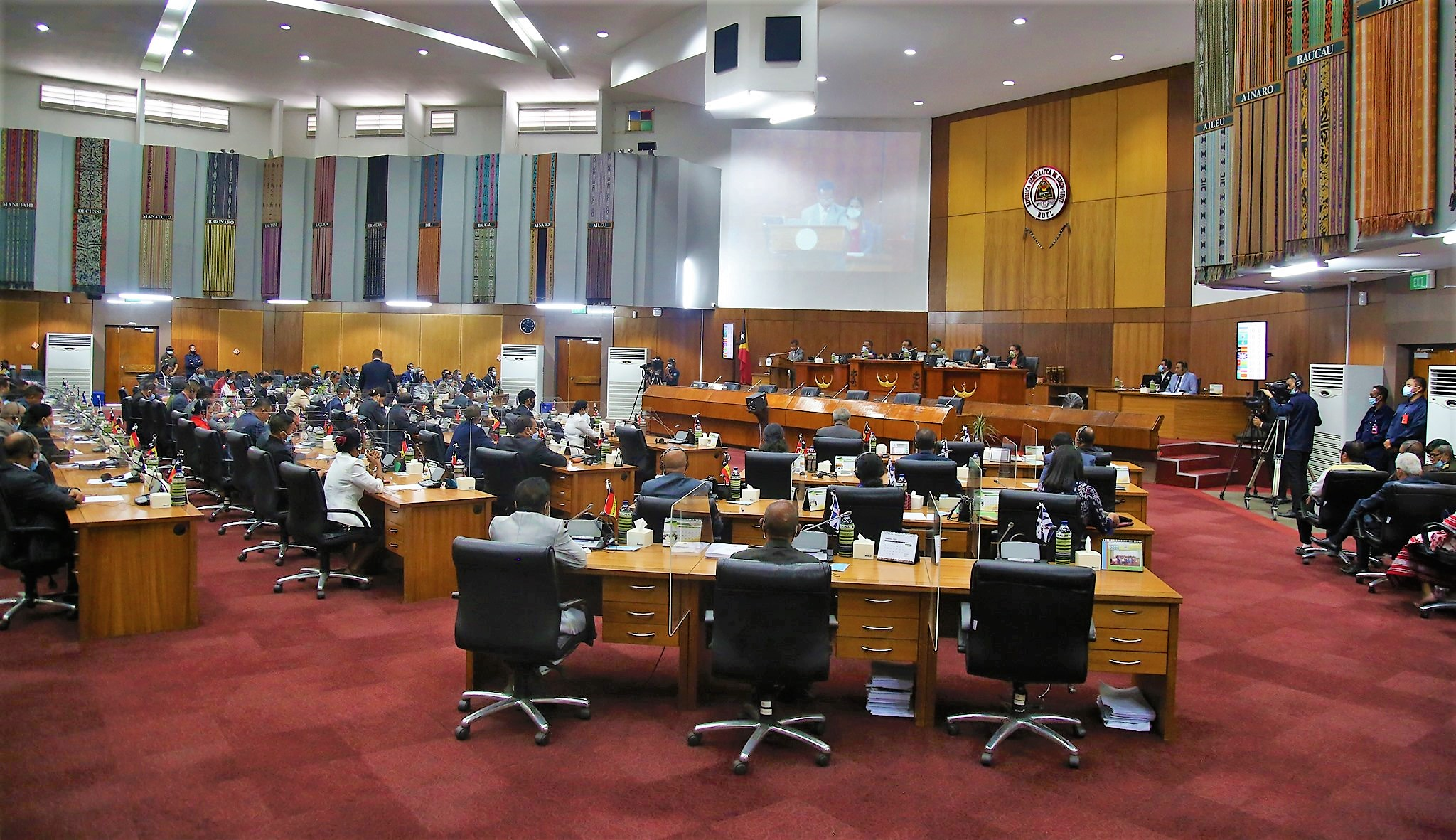

Website
- www.parlamento.tl

The National Parliament (Tetum: Parlamentu Nasionál, Portuguese: Parlamento Nacional) is the unicameral national legislature in Timor-Leste. It was created in 2001 as the Constituent Assembly while the country was still administered by the United Nations, but renamed itself to the National Parliament with the attaining of national independence on 20 May 2002.

== Structure ==
The National Parliament has 65 members, elected every five years through party-list proportional representation voting. The three main components concerning parliament in Timor-Leste are the National Parliament, the prime minister, and the president.

=== President ===
The president is elected in a separate election from the National Parliament, and their role is the head of state. They are able to reject certain legislation, but their role is limited by the Constitution. The current president, as of 20 May 2022, is José Ramos-Horta.

=== Prime minister ===
The president appoints the prime minister, but it is expected that the president will select the leader chosen by the largest party/coalition. Essentially, if no one party is able to form a majority in its own right, then all the members of parliament subsequently elect the head of government. The prime minister carries out the function of the head of government. The current prime minister, as of June 2023, is Kay Rala Xanana Gusmão.

== Elections ==
Elections are held every five years using a party-list proportional representation voting system to elect 65 members to the National Assembly. Voting is voluntary for all East Timorese citizens over the age of 17.

== Current members ==
The 5th National Parliament of Timor-Leste currently consists of 65 members elected in the 2018 election. 34 members are from Alliance for Change and Progress (CNRT–PLP–KHUNTO), 23 are from Fretilin, 5 are from the Democratic Party (PD), and 3 are from Democratic Development Forum (PUDD–UDT–FM–PDN). Each of these MPs will serve a 5-year term, which began in June 2018.

== List of presidents of the National Parliament ==
#	Portrait	Name	Took office	End office	Party	Notes
1		Francisco Guterres	20 May 2002	31 July 2007	Fretilin	
2		Fernando de Araújo	8 August 2007	30 July 2012	Democratic Party	
3		Vicente Guterres	30 July 2012	2016	CNRT	
4		Adérito Hugo da Costa	2016	2017	CNRT	
5		Aniceto Guterres Lopes	5 September 2017	2018	Fretilin	
6		Arão Noé da Costa Amaral	5 April 2018	2020	CNRT	
(5)		Aniceto Guterres Lopes	19 May 2020	22 June 2023	Fretilin	
7		Maria Fernanda Lay	22 June 2023	Incumbent	CNRT	

== Composition of the National Parliament since 2001 ==
1st Parliament (2001–2007)

5th Restructured Parliament (2018–2023)

	Primary vote				Seats				
Election	CNRT	Fretilin	Democratic	Oth.	CNRT	Fretilin	Democratic	Oth.	Total
2001	–	57.37%	8.72%	33.91%	–	55	7	26	88
2007	24.10%	29.02%	11.30%	35.58%	18	21	8	18	65
2012	36.66%	29.87%	10.31%	23.16%	30	25	8	2	65
2017	29.46%	29.66%	9.79%	31.09%	22	23	7	13	65
2018	49.58%	34.16%	8.07%	8.19%	34	23	5	3	65
2023	41.63%	25.75%	9.32%	23.30%	31	19	6	9	65

== See also ==
- Politics of Timor-Leste
- List of legislatures by country
