= Maria Ângela Carrascalão =

Documentalist, author, university teacher and former minister

Maria Ângela Guterres Viegas Carrascalão
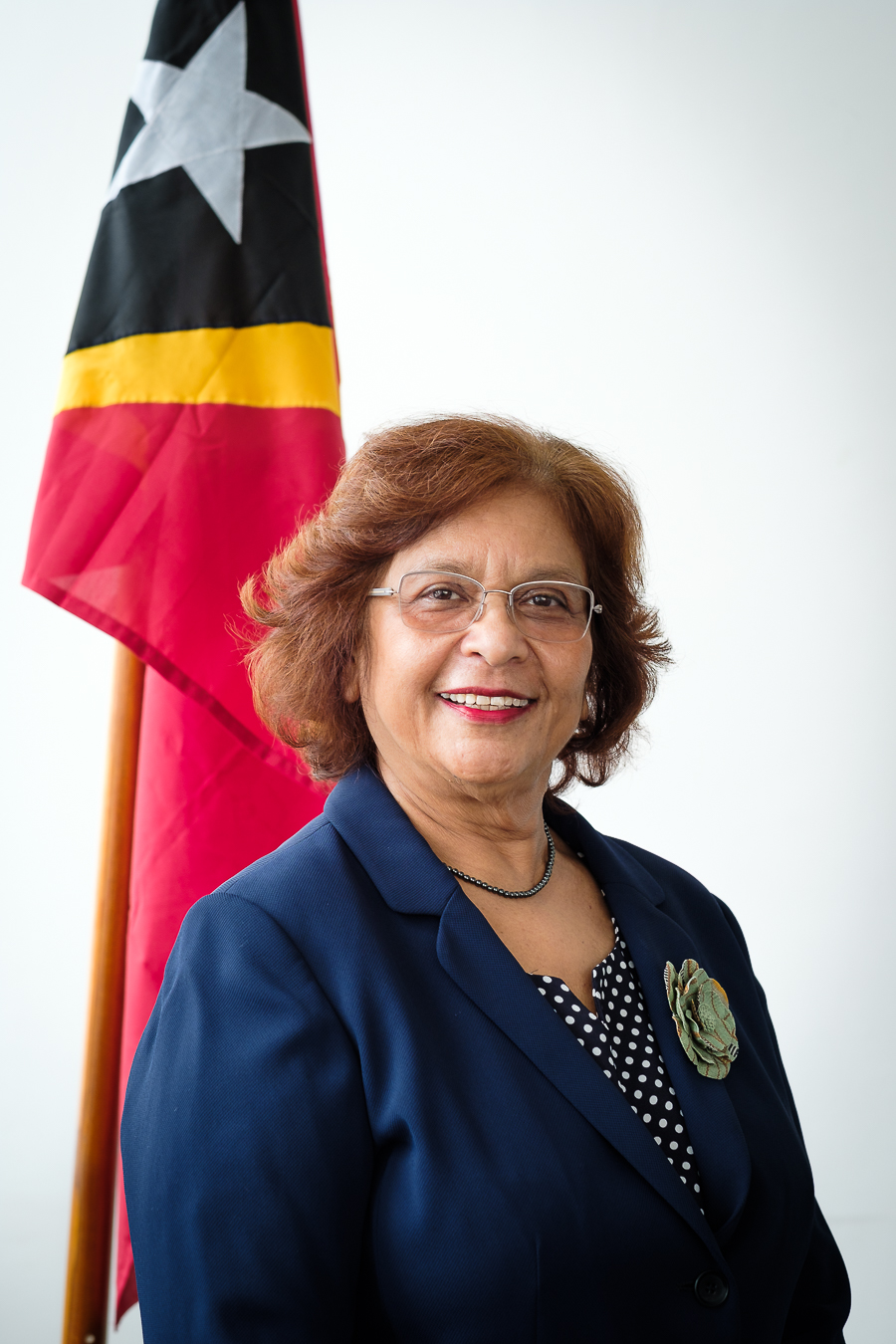

Minister of Justice
- In office 12 October 2017 – 22 June 2018
- Preceded by: Dionísio Babo Soares
- Succeeded by: Manuel Cárceres da Costa

Dean, Faculty of Law, National University of East Timor
- In office 2013–2017

Personal details
- Born: 10 April 1951 (age 75) Caitucoloa, Liquiçá; Portuguese Timor (now East Timor)
- Party: Timorese Democratic Union
- Education: National University of East Timor (UNTL)
- Profession: Journalist, law lecturer

Maria Ângela Guterres Viegas Carrascalão (born 10 April 1951) is an East Timorese journalist, author, university teacher and former Minister of Justice. She is a member of the Timorese Democratic Union (Portuguese: União Democrática Timorense (UDT)). She is the current Ambassador of Timor-Leste to Brazil.

== Early life and education ==
Carrascalão was born in Caitucoloa, Liquiçá, in the then Portuguese Timor, one of thirteen children of Manuel Viegas Carrascalão, a Portuguese exile who married a Timorese woman. Several of her siblings have similarly occupied high political positions. Carrascalão attended Dili Primary School and the Dr. Francisco Machado High School, Dili, graduating in 1970.

== Career ==
Between 1978 and 2002, Carrascalão worked for the Portuguese news agencies Notícias de Portugal (NP), Agência Noticiosa Portuguesa and Lusa, as well as for the television station Sociedade Independente de Comunicação, the magazine Jornal Expresso and the Portuguese newspaper Público. Then, in 2002, she moved to Timor Telecom as a trainer.

From 2004-2005, Carrascalão was the director of the bilingual Tetum/Portuguese newspaper Lia Foun in East Timor, and a correspondent for the Australian radio broadcaster SBS. In 2007-2008 she worked as a documenter and interpreter for the Commission for Reception, Truth and Reconciliation in East Timor.

In 2007, Carrascalão ran as a Timorese Democratic Union candidate in the parliamentary elections, at ninth place in the party's list. The party failed to gain a seat. From 2008 to 2009, she was chief of staff of the Secretary of State for Defence of the IV Government of East Timor.

From 2005 to 2010, Carrascalão studied law at the National University of East Timor and graduated with a doctorate. From January 2011, she was a lecturer, and from 2013-2017 dean, of the Faculty of Law. In 2013, she was also appointed by President Taur Matan Ruak as a member of the Conselho de Opinião of Radio-Televisão Timor Leste for four years.

On 12 October 2017, Carrascalão was appointed Minister of Justice in the VII Government of East Timor by decree of President Francisco Guterres, and sworn in on 17 October. Her term as minister ended with the accession of the VIII Government on 22 June 2018.

On 12 December 2022, Carrascalão took office as the ambassador of Timor-Leste to Brazil.

Carrascalão speaks Tetum, Portuguese, English and French. She has dual East Timorese and Portuguese citizenship.

== Publications ==
- 2002 - Timor, os Anos da Resistência ISBN 9789728730017
- 2012 - Taur Matan Ruak – a vida pela independência ISBN 972757937X
