= Manuel Cárceres da Costa =

East Timorese politician and writer

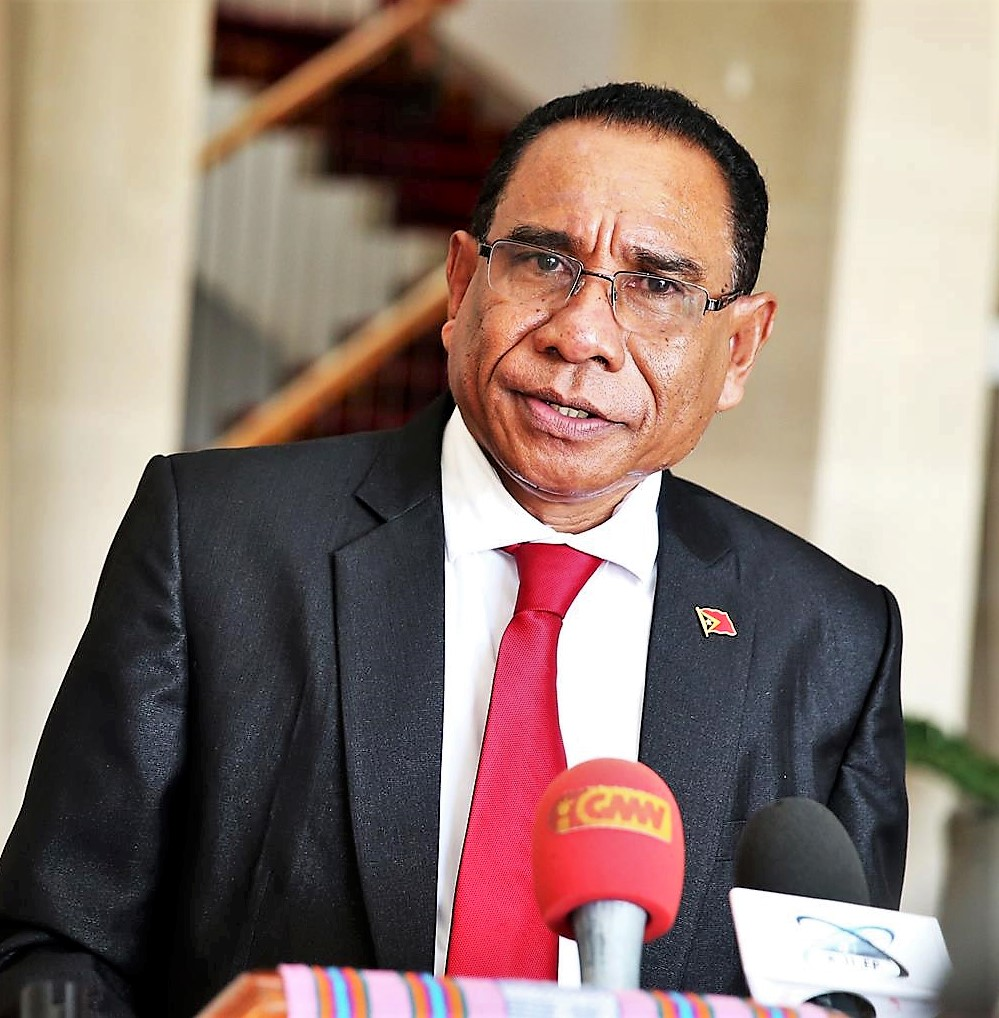
- Cárceres da Costa in 2019

Minister of Justice
- In office 22 June 2018 – 22 March 2022
- Prime Minister: Taur Matan Ruak
- Preceded by: Maria Ângela Carrascalão
- Succeeded by: Tiago Amaral Sarmento

Personal details
- Born: Lacló, Manatuto, Portuguese Timor (now East Timor)
- Party: People's Liberation Party
- Education: Universidade da Paz
- Profession: Writer

Manuel Cárceres da Costa is an East Timorese politician and writer. Between June 2018 and March 2022, he was the Minister of Justice, serving in the VIII Constitutional Government of East Timor led by Prime Minister Taur Matan Ruak.

== Early life ==
Costa is the son of two devoted Roman Catholic teachers who lived in Lacló, in the then District of Manatuto, where he was born. After attending primary school there, he received his secondary education at the Bishop of Medeiros College (Colegio de Bispo de Medeiros) in Dili.

In compliance with a decision of his deceased father, Costa then entered the Seminary of Our Lady of Fatima in Dili. Subsequently, after realising that he was unable to fulfil his parents' dream that he would become a priest, he left the seminary and enrolled at the Liceu Dr. Francisco Machado.

By 1978, Costa had become a Fretilin member; that year he witnessed the destruction by the Indonesians of the East Timorese resistance base in Laclo.

In 1999, Costa graduated with a degree in Public Administration.

== Career ==
After the withdrawal of the Indonesians from East Timor in 1999, Costa worked for the United Nations Transitional Administration in East Timor (UNTAET) and became the UNHCR's representative in East Timor for eight years.

In the 2001 parliamentary election, Costa stood as an independent candidate to become a direct representative for the then district of Manatuto. He received only 838 votes (5.4%).

From 2006 to 2010, Costa studied law, majoring in criminal law, at the Universidade da Paz (UNPAZ) in Dili. In February 2009, he became an advisor to Timor Telecom and, three months later, its director of Institutional Relations until 2018.

On 22 June 2018, after being approached and supported by the People's Liberation Party (PLP), Costa was sworn in as Minister of Justice of the VIII Constitutional Government, under Prime Minister Taur Matan Ruak. Up to that point, he had considered that his political career had ended in 2001.

In an interview published in May 2019, Costa said that he had told Ruak during his pre-appointment meeting that "I come to serve, not add more numbers to ministerial positions."

Costa remained in office as Minister of Justice notwithstanding the breakdown of the Alliance for Change and Progress (AMP) coalition during the first few months of 2020, and the consequent restructuring of the government in mid-2020. However, at the end of February 2022, the Prime Minister gave him permission to take leave for health reasons. On 22 March 2022, he was replaced by Tiago Amaral Sarmento.

== Publications ==
In addition to his autobiographical book 26 anos, to testemunho (Dili: Livraria Central, 2010, 2nd edition 2013; OCLC 897041092) on the East Timorese struggle for freedom, Costa has written various poems on the same topic. He speaks Tetum, Portuguese, Indonesian and English.
