= Longuinhos dos Santos =

East Timorese politician

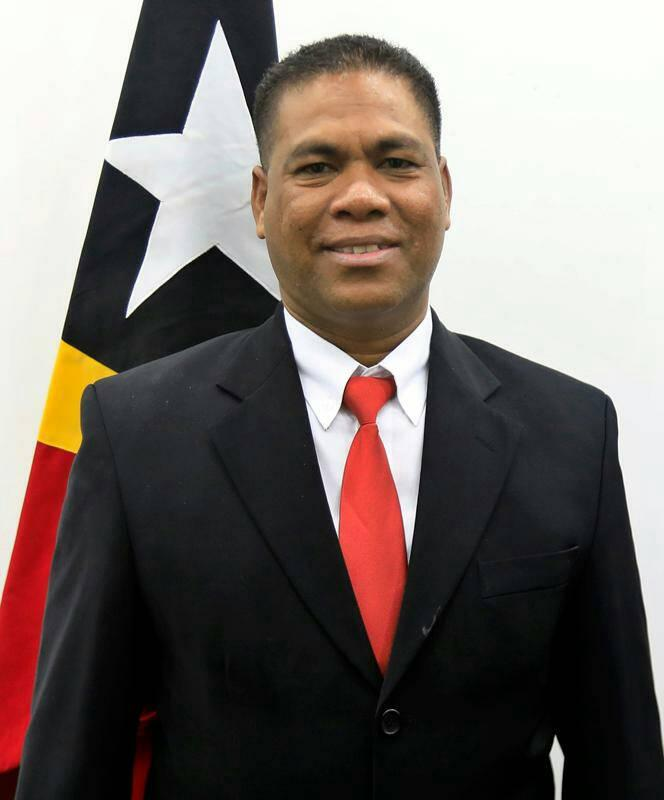
- Santos in 2018

Minister of Higher Education, Science, and Culture
- In office 22 June 2018 – 1 July 2023
- Prime Minister: Taur Matan Ruak
- Preceded by: Fernando Hanjam
- Succeeded by: Jose Honorio da Costa Jerónimo

Personal details
- Born: 4 July 1974 (age 51): Maliana, Bobonaro, Portuguese Timor; (now East Timor)
- Party: People's Liberation Party

Longuinhos dos Santos (born 4 July 1974) is an East Timorese politician, and a member of the People's Liberation Party (PLP).

From June 2018 to July 2023, he was Minister of Higher Education, Science and Culture, serving in the VIII Constitutional Government of East Timor led by Prime Minister Taur Matan Ruak.

== Early life and education ==
Between 1982 and 1991, Santos attended primary and then pre-secondary school in Maliana. He completed his secondary education, in the then Liquiçá District, in 1994, but was then prevented by the then political circumstances in East Timor from continuing his studies. Until the 1999 East Timorese independence referendum, he provided services to clandestine liberation networks.

Santos resumed his studies in 2001, at the Faculty of Economics and Management of the National University of Timor-Leste (UNTL). He completed that course in 2007.

== Career ==
Santos has had an academic career. As of 2014, he was the Second Vice-Dean of the UNTL.

On 22 June 2018, he was sworn in as Minister of Higher Education, Science and Culture.

Santos's tenure as Minister ended when the IX Constitutional Government took office on 1 July 2023. He was succeeded by José Honório da Costa Gerónimo.
