= Universidade Católica Timorense =

Catholic university in Dili, East Timor

Timorese Catholic University
- Universidade Católica Timorense
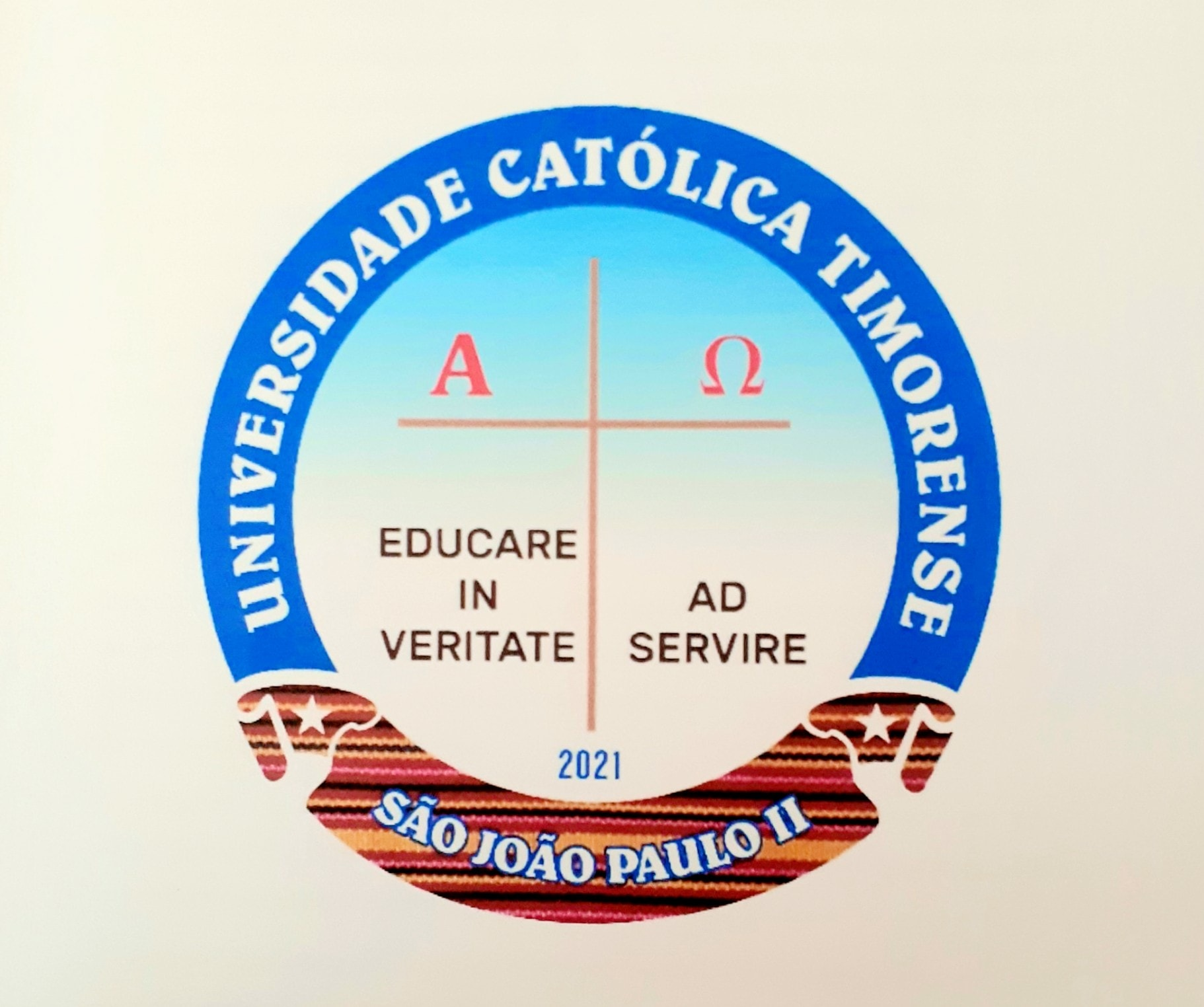
- Motto: Educare in veritate ad servire
- Motto in English: "Educate in truth to serve"
- Type: Private university
- Established: 8 December 2021; 4 years ago
- Accreditation: ANAAA
- Religious affiliation: Catholic Church
- Chancellor: Virgílio do Carmo da Silva
- Rector: Joel Casimiro Pinto
- Academic staff: 140 (2025)
- Students: 2,144 (2025)
- Location: Dili, Timor-Leste; 8°33′55″S 125°35′00″E
- Campus: Urban
- Website: uct.edu.tl

St. John Paul II Timorese Catholic University (UCT; Portuguese: Universidade Católica Timorense São João Paulo II; Tetum: Universidade Katólika Timorense) is a private Catholic university in Dili, Timor-Leste. Inaugurated on 8 December 2021, the university admitted its first 491 students in March 2022 and has since grown to an enrollment of 2,144. The first Catholic university in the country, UCT operates under the Archdiocese of Dili with funding from the national government. The university's campus is located in the Balide area of Dili.

UCT comprises four faculties—education, language, and arts; medical sciences; social sciences; and agricultural engineering—offering 22 undergraduate degree programs, along with a MBBS medical degree program. The university has 140 academic faculty, mostly Timorese along with some international faculty. The university is selective, accepting 500 students each year from an applicant pool of over 1,500. UCT is a member of several international academic associations and has partnerships with a number of foreign universities.

== History ==
Establishing a Catholic university in Timor-Leste was a longstanding goal of the Archdiocese of Dili, beginning during the tenure of Bishop Carlos Filipe Ximenes Belo (1983–2002) and later under Bishop Alberto Ricardo da Silva (2004–2015). On 16 July 2021, Archbishop Virgílio do Carmo da Silva, submitted an application to the Ministry of Higher Education, Science and Culture to establish a university. The new university, the archbishop said, would incorporate and expand upon the diocese's existing higher education institution, the Instituto de Ciências Religiosas (ICR). A month later, on 13 August, da Silva met with Prime Minister Taur Matan Ruak to discuss the process, after which the archbishop said he hoped the university could open later that year.

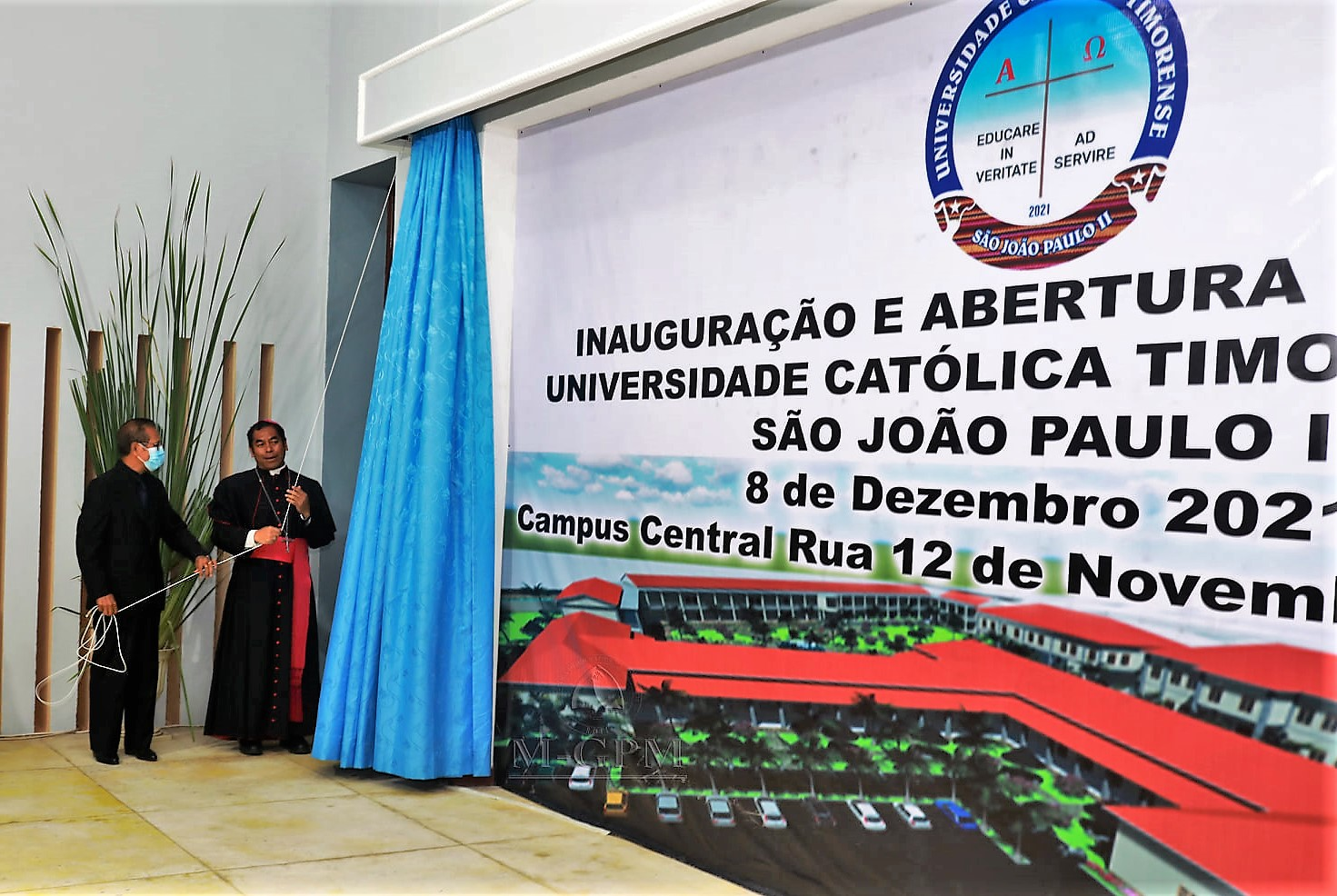
UCT inauguration ceremony, 8 December 2021

On 3 December 2021, the Ministry of Higher Education granted the archdiocese an operational license, and three days later, on 6 December, Archbishop da Silva issued a decree establishing the new university. The Universidade Católica Timorense São João Paulo II was inaugurated on 8 December by the archbishop and Prime Minister Taur Matan Ruak at its campus in Dili's Balide neighborhood. The university, Archbishop da Silva said, would "provide a world-class education in all areas of human activity, inspired by the Catholic intellectual, moral, and spiritual traditions." The university was dedicated to Pope John Paul II, who visited East Timor in 1989 when the country was still under Indonesian rule and with whom, Ruak said, Timor-Leste "shares a great bond of love and devotion." On 14 December, Archbishop da Silva inaugurated UCT's first rector, the Franciscan friar Joel Casimiro Pinto, other administrative officers, and the 31 members of the university council.

UCT opened its enrollment in February 2022, accepting 491 students for its first incoming class from a pool of roughly 2,000 applicants. The university opened with four faculties—education, arts, and culture; health sciences; social sciences; and agricultural engineering—and 50 faculty, with plans to continue expanding. Initially, UCT accepted students for 13 departments, including two that were previously part of ICR. Incoming students were required to complete a sixth-month course to learn Portuguese and English before beginning their regular studies. UCT opened its academic year on 24 March 2022 with a ceremony attended by Archbishop da Silva, former president José Ramos-Horta, and Holy See representative Msgr. Marco Sprizzi. At the ceremony, the university's first rector, Rev. Joel Casimiro Pinto said that UCT aimed "to be the premier university for scientific teaching and research in Timor-Leste." The university opened the 2023 academic year on 15 March 2023 with a ceremony attended by President Ramos-Horta.

UCT held its first graduation on 7 September 2023 in ceremony at the Nobel Peace Hall (Portuguese: Salão Nobel da Paz) in its Balide campus. The university awarded degrees to 31 graduates from the faculties of education and social sciences, including students who previously attended the stand-alone Instituto de Ciências Religiosas. On 22 October 2023—the feast day of St. John Paul II, the university's patron saint—UCT held a mass, led by Archbishop da Silva, to commemorate UCT's first anniversary and lay the foundation stone for a new four-story building on campus. In March 2025, the university received an A-grade institutional accreditation from the National Agency for Academic Evaluation and Accreditation.

The university grew to 1,240 students in 2023, 1,700 in 2024, and 2,144 by February 2025. Each year, 500 new students are accepted from an application pool of over 1,500.

== Campus ==
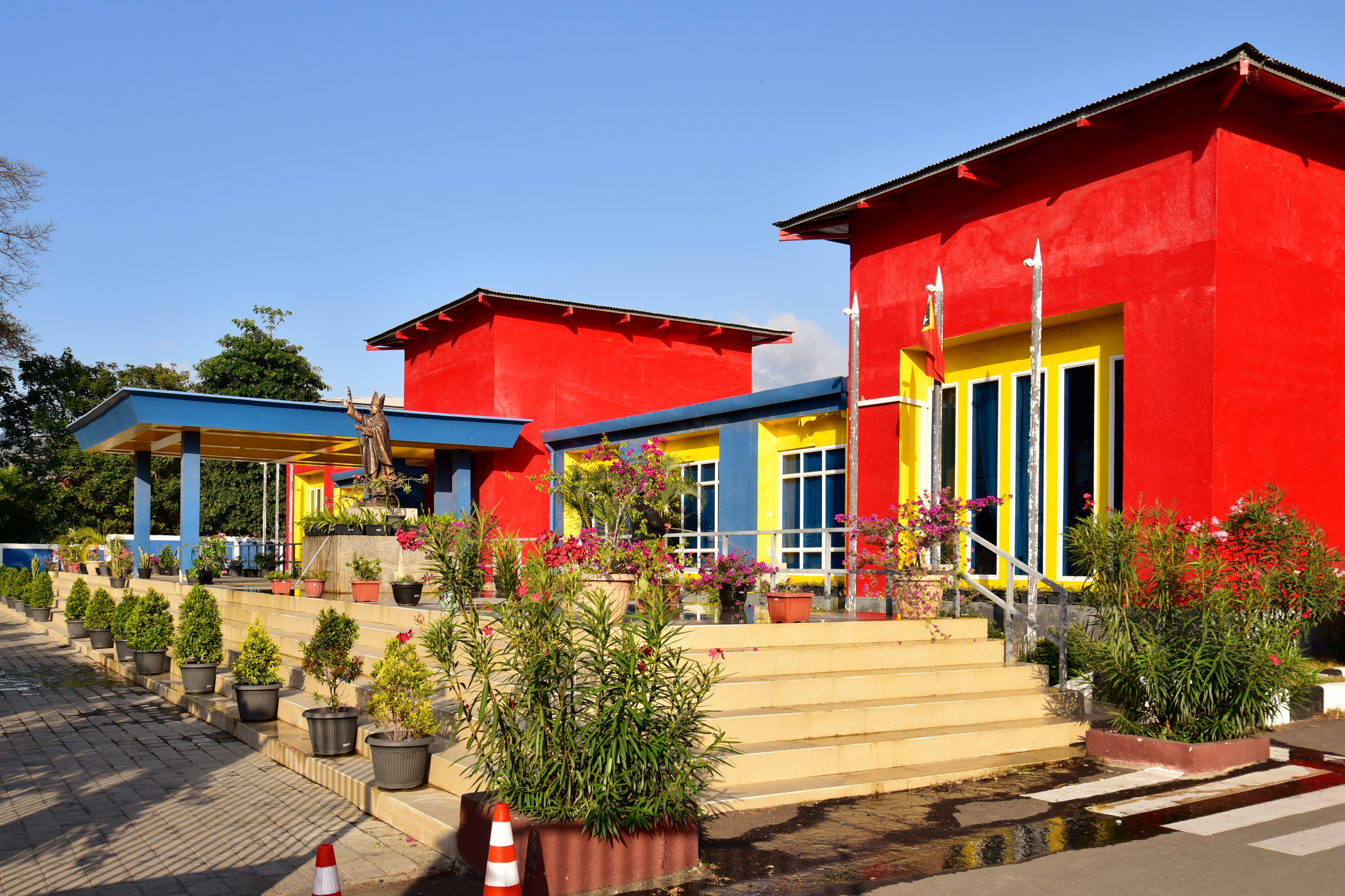
UCT administration building

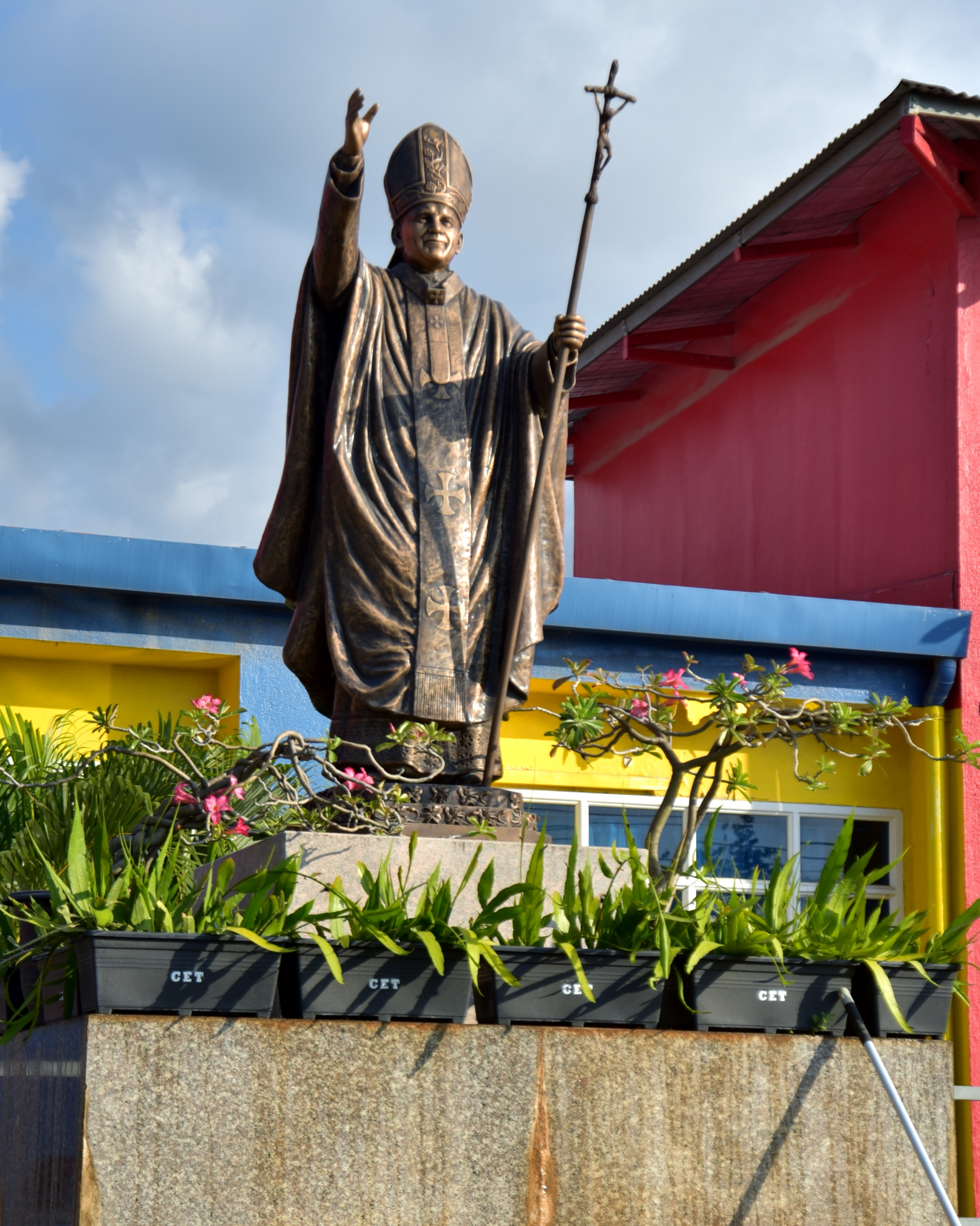
Statue of Pope John Paul II on UCT's campus

UCT's campus is located in Balide in the eastern part of Dili, at a property owned by the Archdiocese of Dili and formerly used by the Colégio de São José high school. A statue of Pope John Paul II, the university's patron saint, stands at the entrance of the campus. The university's Benedict XVI Library (Portuguese: Biblioteca Bento XVI) was inaugurated on 15 March 2023 in a ceremony attended by President José Ramos-Horta. Donors to the library's collection included Prime Minister Xanana Gusmão, politician Paulo Remédios, and Ramos-Horta, who alone contributed 3,400 books.

In 2023, UCT broke ground on a new four-story building which, when complete, will contain new classrooms, laboratories, and the university's library. The building was constructed by an Iranian company and financed by the archdiocese using funding provided annually to the church by the government for educational, social, and administrative purposes. On 19 March 2025, UCT held an inauguration ceremony for the new facility, named the Pope Francis Building. The ceremony was presided over by Prime Minister Xanana Gusmão and Archbishop of Dili Virgílio do Carmo da Silva.

== Organization and administration ==
UCT operates under the Archdiocese of Dili, and is financed through annual funding provided by the national government to the archdiocese, half of which is earmarked for educational purposes. The titular leader of the university is the chancellor, an office held by the archbishop of Dili—currently Virgílio do Carmo da Silva. The university's chief executive is the rector, currently the Franciscan friar Joel Casimiro Pinto since the university's founding in December 2021. The rector is assisted by a general administrator and four vice-rectors: of institutional and pastoral development; of postgraduate studies, research, and cooperation; of teaching and academic affairs; and of student support. The rector is additionally supported by an academic senate and university council.

The university is composed of four faculties—education, language, and arts; medical sciences; social sciences; and agricultural engineering—each led by a dean. The faculty of medical sciences contains the university's medical, nursing, and pharmacy schools, each headed by a coordinator. The agricultural engineering faculty comprises the schools of agrotechnology and animal husbandry, headed by a coordinator and director, respectively. The faculty of education, language, and arts is divided into the school of education, the school of languages, and the Institute of Religious Sciences (ICR; Instituto de Ciências Religiosas), each headed by a director. The ICR was previously an independent institution within the Archdiocese of Dili before being subsumed into the new UCT. The faculty of social sciences is composed of the schools of law, social communication, social work, and business, each with its own director. As of 2025, UCT has 140 academic faculty, mostly Timorese as well as a smaller number of international faculty.

== Academics ==
UCT faculties and degrees
Faculty	Course
Medical Sciences	General Medicine
Medical Sciences	Nursing
Medical Sciences	Pharmacy
Social Sciences	General law
Social Sciences	Accounting
Social Sciences	Business Management
Social Sciences	Social Communication
Social Sciences	Social Work
Social Sciences	Public Management
Education, Language, & Arts	Teacher Training, Preschool & Basic Education 1st Cycle
Education, Language, & Arts	Teacher Training, History & Geography
Education, Language, & Arts	Teacher Training, Sociology & Economics
Education, Language, & Arts	Teacher Training, Mathematics & Physics
Education, Language, & Arts	Teacher Training, Biology & Chemistry
Education, Language, & Arts	Teacher Training, Catholic Religion & Morality
Education, Language, & Arts	Pastoral Theology & Catechesis
Education, Language, & Arts	Portuguese Language & Literature
Education, Language, & Arts	English Language & Literature
Education, Language, & Arts	Music
Agricultural Engineering	Agrotechnology
Agricultural Engineering	Animal Husbandry
Agricultural Engineering	Agribusiness

At the start of its first academic year in March 2022, UCT had four faculties—education, arts, and culture; health sciences; social sciences; and agricultural engineering—divided into 20 departments (some of which were still planned and not yet enrolling students). As of the 2024 academic year, UCT comprises four faculties—education, language, and arts; medical sciences; social sciences; and agricultural engineering—offering 22 degree programs.

Portuguese is the main teaching language at UCT. At the time of the university's opening, students were required to complete a sixth-month course to learn Portuguese and English before beginning their studies. As of 2023, incoming students are required to have at least an A2 level of Portuguese; if they test lower, they must take a year-long preparatory language course to achieve the minimal level before beginning their regular courses.

In March 2025, UCT received its institutional accreditation from the National Agency for Academic Evaluation and Accreditation (ANAAA; Portuguese: Agência Nacional para a Avaliação e Acreditação Académica), following an evaluation carried out by ANAAA representatives during 9–10 July 2024. UCT achieved an A-level accreditation, the maximum possible grade. Previously, UCT was licensed to operate as a university by the Ministry of Higher Education, Science and Culture, in line with government policy that requires new universities to operate for two years before being eligible for evaluation by ANAAA.

=== International cooperation ===
UCT is a member of the Management Forum of Higher Education in the Portuguese-Speaking Countries and Regions (FORGES) and the Association of Southeast and East Asian Catholic Colleges and Universities (ASEACCU), a regional affiliate of the International Federation of Catholic Universities (IFCU). The university has agreements with the Catholic organizations AGIAMONDO and Fidesco International, based in Germany and France, respectively, which send volunteers to serve in roles requested by the university. UCT also has an agreement with the Korea International Cooperation Agency (KOICA).

UCT has cooperation agreements related to teaching, research, and professional development with a number of universities, including the national Universidade Nacional Timor Lorosa'e as well as international institutions including the Atma Jaya Catholic University of Indonesia, the Australian Catholic University, the Catholic University of Mozambique, the Catholic University of Portugal, LSi Business School in Cambodia, the University of Brasília, the University of Minho in Portugal, the University of Saint Joseph in Macau, the Universitas Katolik Darma Cendika in Surabaya, and the Universitas Katolik Widya Mandira in Kupang.

In April 2024, UCT signed a memorandum of understanding with IndoMed Educare, an Indian medical education consultancy, to establish a Bachelor of Medicine, Bachelor of Surgery (MBBS) program intended to attract foreign students to the university. As of February 2025, the program has 144 active students from India, Bangladesh, Pakistan, Nepal, and Sri Lanka.

== Student life ==
The UCT Student Association (Portuguese: Associação Estudantil da UCT) organizes students activities and represents the student body within the university.

== Notable people ==
=== Rectors ===
- Rev. Joel Casimiro Pinto, OFM (2021–present)

== See also ==
- List of universities in Timor-Leste
