= Baucau (disambiguation) =

Baucau is the second-largest city in East Timor.

Baucau may also refer to:

- Baucau (Martian crater), an impact crater on Mars
- Baucau Administrative Post, a post in Baucau Municipality
- Baucau Airport, formerly Cakung Airport, an unattended airport near Baucau
- Baucau Municipality, a municipality, formerly a district, of East Timor
- Baucau Teachers College, a teacher education facility
