= Tiago Amaral Sarmento =

East Timorese politician and lawyer

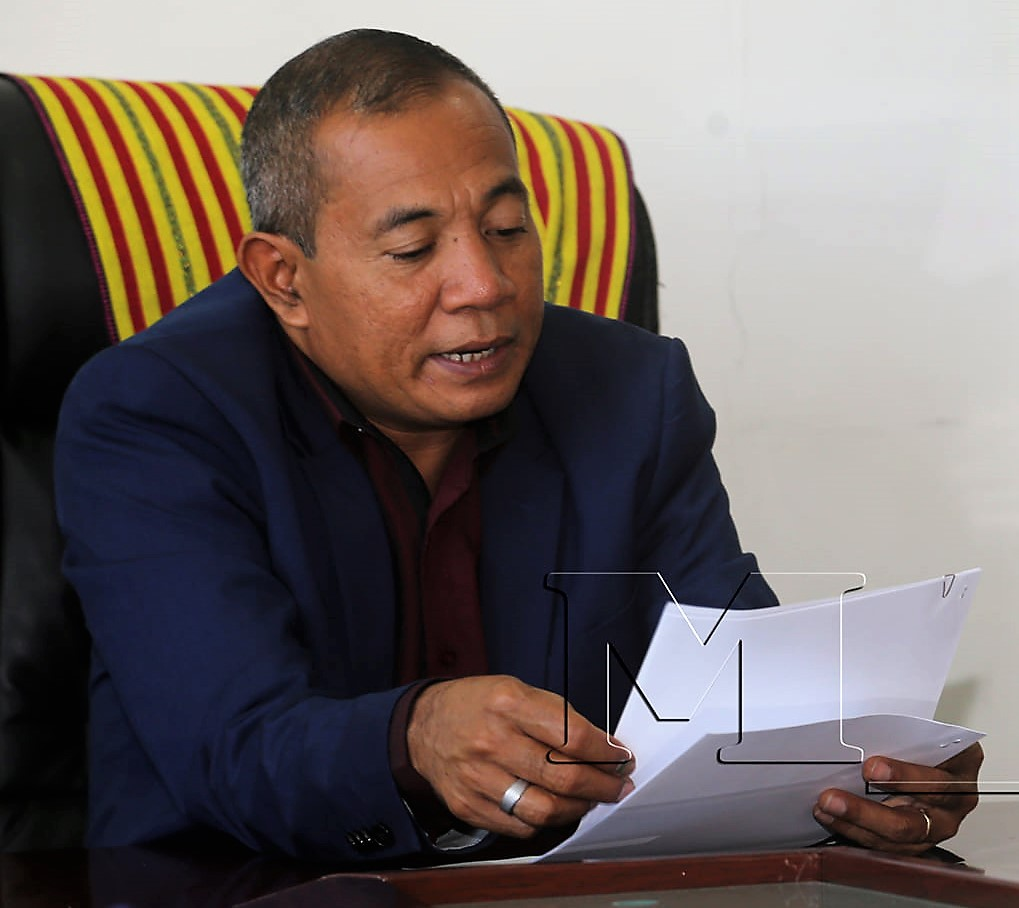
- Sarmento in 2022

Minister of Justice
- In office 22 March 2022 – 1 July 2023
- Prime Minister: Taur Matan Ruak
- Preceded by: Manuel Cárceres da Costa
- Succeeded by: Amândio Benevides

Personal details
- Born: 19 November 1974 (age 51): Uma Uain Craic, Viqueque, Portuguese Timor; (now East Timor)
- Spouse: Lourdes Lay
- Children: 4
- Education: University of National Education
- Profession: Lawyer

Tiago Amaral Sarmento (born 19 November 1974) is an East Timorese politician and lawyer.

From March 2023 to July 2023, he was the Minister of Justice, serving in the VIII Constitutional Government of East Timor led by Prime Minister Taur Matan Ruak.

== Early life and education ==
Sarmento was born in Fahi Berek, an Aldeia (village) in Suco Uma Uain Craic, Viqueque, Portuguese Timor (now East Timor), to father Joao Augosto Sarmento, a catechist, and mother Recardinha Amaral Sarmento. He is the second-born of five brothers, the others being Téofilo Amaral Sarmento, Tome Amaral Sarmento, Tadeu Amaral Sarmento and Remendancia Amaral Sarmento.

After beginning his primary level education at 01 Elementary School (Indonesian: SDN 01) in Viqueque, Sarmento attended St Maria Goretti Junior High School (Indonesian: SMPK Sta. Maria Goreti), Viqueque. His secondary education, at St Joseph's College High School (Indonesian: SMA Kolese Santo Yoseph), was completed in 1994.

From 1991 to 1996, Sarmento also attended the Seminary of Our Lady of Fatima in Dili. In 1995–1996, he was a Seminary intern at St. Aloysius Gonzaga School (Portuguese: Colégio São Luís Gonzaga) in Ainaro, where he prepared students to enter the minor seminary.

Sarmento then studied law at the University of National Education (Indonesian: Universitas Pendidikan Nasional (UNDIKNAS)) in Denpasar, Bali, Indonesia; he completed his degree in 2002.

While at UNDIKNAS, Sarmento began providing legal assistance in land disputes, under a scheme coordinated by UNDIKNAS's Faculty of Law. In 1997-1999 he was the Secretary-General of the Bali branch of the East Timor Association of University and High School Students (Indonesian: Ikatan Mahasiswa dan Pelajar Timor Timur (IMPETTU)), and in 1999 he was the spokesman for the Timorese students who campaigned in Bali for independence from Indonesia.

== Legal career ==
From November 1999 until 2001, Sarmento worked in Viqueque as an interpreter for United Nations Military Observers (UNMO), initially with the United Nations Mission in East Timor (UNAMET), and later with the United Nations Transitional Administration in East Timor (UNTAET).

In 2003, he began serving as a lawyer and legal researcher writing reports on serious crimes the subject of prosecutions at the Special Panels for Serious Crimes (SPSC) in Dili, and at the Ad Hoc Court in Jakarta, Indonesia. According to the official profile of Sarmento on the website of the Ministry of Justice, these reports dealt with human rights and justice issues, and later served as important recommendations for the establishment and development of the justice system in East Timor.

In April 2004, Sarmento, acting as a representative of the Catholic Institute for International Relations, a UK-based non-governmental organization (NGO), made a statement during a General Debate on Civil and Political Rights at the United Nations Commission on Human Rights (UNCHR), about what he said were overall weaknesses in the independence of the judiciary in East Timor. In particular, according to a press release issued by the UNCHR reporting on the debate, he asserted that there was:

"... an urgent need to ensure that there was a mandate for the continuation of the work of the Serious Crimes Unit and Special Panels after the expiration of the mandate of the United Nations Mission of Support in East Timor (UNMISET)."

From 2004 to 2007, Sarmento was the Executive Director of the Judicial System Monitoring Program (Portuguese: Programa de Monitoramento do Sistema Judicial, Tetun: Programa Monitorizasaun Sistema Judisiál) (JSMP), an NGO that monitors the justice system and engages in advocacy relating to the rule of law in East Timor. Between 2005 and 2008, he was the Secretary-General of the Association of Lawyers of East Timor (Portuguese: Assosiacão dos Advogados Timor-Leste (AATL)).

In 2011, Sarmento was elected by the National Parliament as a permanent member of the Supreme Council of the Public Defender's Office (Portuguese: Defensoria Pública, Tetun: Defensoria Públika (DP)). On 17 June 2020, the Council of Ministers appointed him as a permanent member of the Superior Council of the Judiciary (Portuguese: Conselho Superior Judicial, Tetun: Konsellu Superiór Judisiál), on the proposal of the Minister of Justice, Manuel Cárceres da Costa.

== Political career ==
On 22 March 2022, Sarmento was sworn in as the new Minister of Justice, succeeding Costa. Just over a week later, on 1 April 2022, he attended the launch of the Ecclesiastical Court of the Roman Catholic Archdiocese of Díli by the Archbishop of Díli and the Vatican's representative in East Timor. The function of the court is to deal with matrimonial cases in accordance with canon law.

Speaking at the launching ceremony, Sarmento said that the new court was not related to State courts, and that the government appreciated that the Archdiocese was establishing an important court for Catholics.

In May 2022, Sarmento told journalists that the Ministry was also committed to judicial reform in State courts, a process that had begun in 2019. The strategic goal of the process, as reported in the media, was the establishment of a strong judicial system, to ensure that all rights are respected, and that everyone has access to justice quickly and easily. The following month, June 2022, during a meeting with the Country Representative of the World Bank, he confirmed that he would give priority to the management of existing State-owned land and property, and would also focus on the assignment and distribution of land title certificates to private owners of land.

Also that month, Sarmento met with the East Timor Football Federation (FFTL), as representative of the International Association Football Federation (FIFA), and handed over documentation assigning the site of the National Stadium, including land known as Kampo Demokrasia, to the FFTL. The assignment, for a price to be agreed later, was made in connection with a long-term contract between the parties, under which the Stadium and other football fields in East Timor would be brought up to international standards, at FIFA's expense.

In July 2022, Sarmento announced that he would make every effort to ensure that the Public Defender's Office (DP) would become financially autonomous, and no longer be overseen by the Ministry of Justice [translation]:

"I have communicated with the opposition benches and the Government benches and they are ready to amend the Statute of the Public Defender's Office, so that the Public Defender's Office can become a financially and administratively autonomous institution."

Meanwhile, Sarmento was involved in negotiations with the Vatican concerning the application of the Agreement between the Holy See and the Democratic Republic of East Timor (better known in East Timor as the Concordata) made on 14 August 2015. In particular, serious difficulties had arisen as to the public recognition in East Timor of the legal personality of ecclesiastical institutions, and negotiations over that issue had been initiated in early 2020. Following discussions between Sarmento and the Chargé d'affaires of the Holy See in April and September 2022, the government formally recognised the civil legal personality of all such institutions that had acquired such personality in accordance with canon law.

Sarmento's tenure as Minister ended when the IX Constitutional Government took office on 1 July 2023. He was succeeded by Amândio Benevides.
