= List of universities in Timor-Leste =

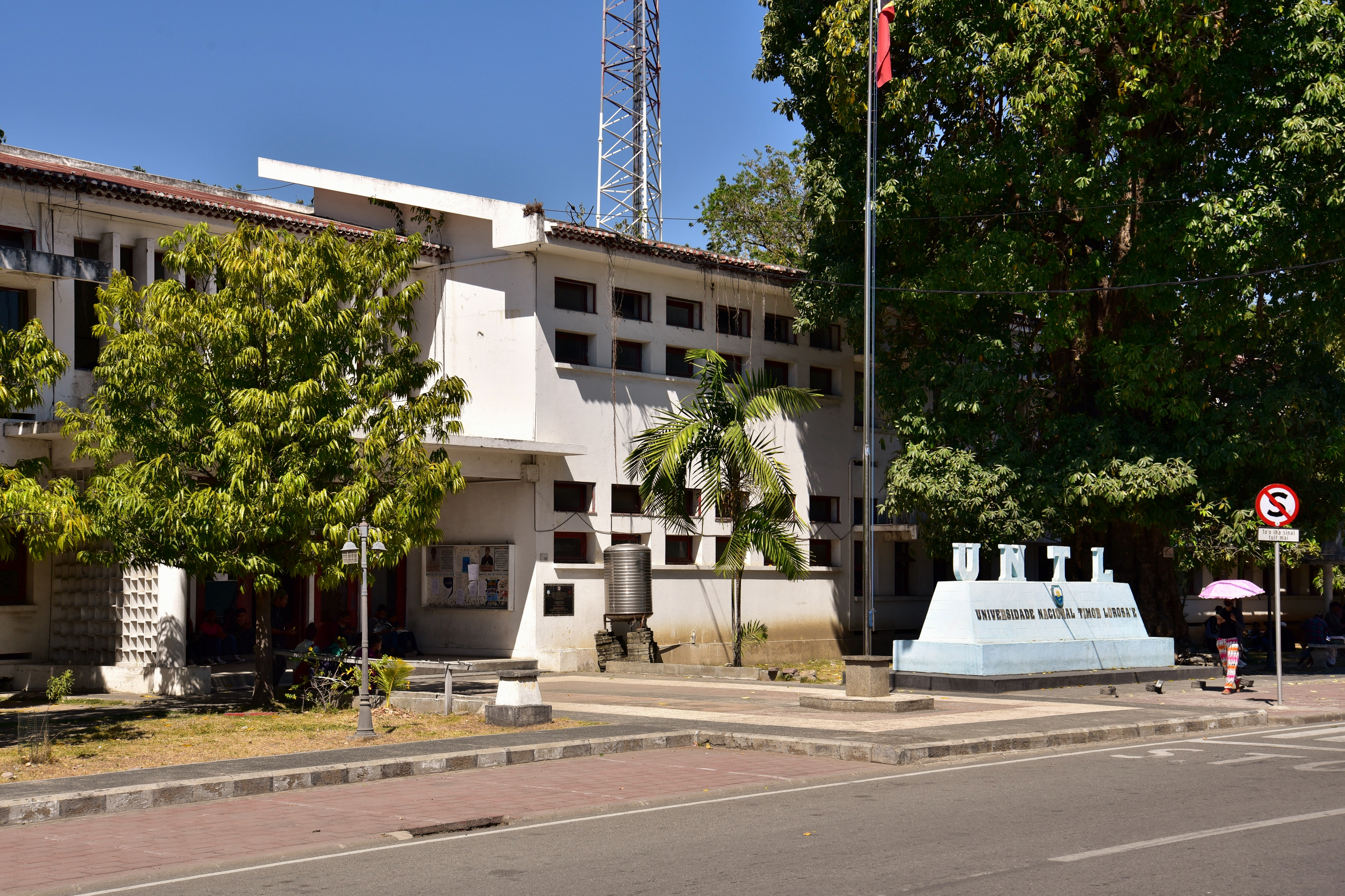
Universidade Nacional Timor Lorosa'e central campus, Dili, 2023

This is a list of universities and other higher education institutions in Timor-Leste. Timor-Leste has one public national university, Universidade Nacional Timor Lorosa'e, established in 2000 to replace the Indonesian-era Universitas Timor Timur and Dili Polytechnic. The country also has a number of private universities, including the Dili Institute of Technology, the Institute of Business, Instituto Superior Cristal, Joao Saldanha University, Universidade Dili, Universidade Oriental Timor Lorosa'e, and Universidade da Paz. A Catholic university, Universidade Católica Timorense, was established in 2021. All of Timor-Leste's universities are based in the capital, Dili, but several also have satellite campuses in other locations.

In addition to universities, Timor-Leste also has a number of specialized higher education institutions. There are several technical schools, including the East Timor Coffee Institute, Instituto Dom Boaventura de Timor-Leste, Instituto Ciência da Saúde, Instituto Profissional de Canossa, and the government-run Instituto Politécnico de Betano. Timor-Leste has three teacher training institutes, Instituto Católico para Formação de Professores, Instituto São João de Brito, and Instituto Universitário Naroman Esperansa. There are also several theological institutions, including Instituto de Ciências Religiosas, Instituto Filosófico de São Francisco de Sales, Instituto Superior de Filosofia e de Teologia, and St. Peter and St. Paul Major Seminary. The government also operates the Instituto da Defesa Nacional to provide higher education to members of the military.

Most of Timor-Leste's institutions of higher education are accredited by the National Agency for Academic Assessment and Accreditation (ANAAA), part of the Ministry of Higher Education, Science and Culture.

== Universities ==
Institution	Acronym	Location(s)	Control	Founded	Accreditation
Dili Institute of Technology	DIT	Dili, Baucau, Pante Macassar	Private	2002	ANAAA
East Timor Institute of Business	IOB	Dili, Maliana	Private	2002	ANAAA
Instituto Superior Cristal	ISC	Dili, Aileu, Baucau, Same	Private	2001	ANAAA
Joao Saldanha University	JSU	Hera	Private	2015	ANAAA
Universidade Católica Timorense	UCT	Dili	Private	2021	ANAAA
Universidade Dili	UNDIL	Dili	Private	2002	ANAAA
Universidade Nacional Timor Lorosa'e	UNTL	Dili, Hera	Public	1986, 2000	ANAAA
Universidade Oriental Timor Lorosa'e	UNITAL	Dili	Private	2002	ANAAA
Universidade da Paz	UNPAZ	Dili, Ermera, Liquiçá, Suai	Private	2004	ANAAA

== Other institutions ==
Institution	Acronym	Location(s)	Control	Founded	Accreditation
East Timor Coffee Institute	ETCI	Gleno	Private	2003	ANAAA
Instituto Católico para Formação de Professores	ICFP	Baucau	Private	2003	ANAAA
Instituto da Defesa Nacional	IDN	Dili	Public	2010	
Instituto Dom Boaventura de Timor-Leste	IBTL	Same	Private	2020	ANAAA
Instituto Ciência da Saúde	ICS	Dili	Private	2005	ANAAA
Instituto Filosófico de São Francisco de Sales	IFFS	Dili	Private	2012	ANAAA
Instituto Politécnico de Betano	IPB	Betano	Public	2017	ANAAA
Instituto Profissional de Canossa	IPDC	Dili	Private	2003	ANAAA
Instituto São João de Brito	ISJB	Kasait	Private	2016	ANAAA
Instituto Superior de Filosofia e de Teologia	ISFIT	Dili	Private	2013	ANAAA
Instituto Universitário Naroman Esperansa	IUNE	Gleno	Private	2023	
St. Peter and St. Paul Major Seminary	SPEPAL	Dili	Private	2000	

== Defunct institutions ==
- Dili Polytechnic (1990–1999), merged into the new Universidade Nacional Timor Lorosa'e
- Institut Pastoral Indonesia St. Thomas Aquinas Filial Dili (1986–1999), Catholic institute affiliated with the Institut Pastoral Indonesia in Malang
- Instituto de Ciências Religiosas (1988–2021), merged into the new Universidade Católica Timorense
- Sekolah Perawat Kesehatan di Dili (1980–1999)
- Sekolah Tinggi Ilmu Ekonomi Dili (1998–1999), predecessor of Universidade Dili
- Universidade Comunidade Matebian (UCM; c. 2003)
- Universidade Dom Martinho Lopes (UNIMAR; c. 2003)
- Universidade Jupiter (UNTER; c. 2003), affiliated with Escola Secundária Geral FINANTIL
- Universidade Maulear (c. 2003), supported by Rogério Lobato
- Universitas Timor Timur (UNTIM; 1986–1999), merged into the new Universidade Nacional Timor Lorosa'e
