= Copa Timor =

- Founded: 1995; 31 years ago
- Country: Timor Leste; Australia; Portugal
- Confederation: AFC
- Number of clubs: 8
- Current champions: Timor B (2013-14)

Copa Timor (English: Timor Cup) is the annual cup competition for amateur football teams in Timor Leste. This competition is managed by Federação de Futebol de Timor-Leste.

== Teams ==
=== 1995 ===
Competition played in Sydney.

1. Sydney Temorense Uneted A
2. Sydney Temorense Uneted B
3. (Australia) Buffalo (Melbourne)
4. (Australia) Buldog (Melbourne)
5. (Australia) Brisbane
6. (Australia) Brother's Darwin

=== 1997-98 ===
Competition played in Perth.

1. Casuarina FC (new team)
2. (Australia) Darwin FC (new team)

Cup Winners Darwin Brothers

=== 2001-02 ===
Competition played in Darwin.

1. East Timor Brothers United (new team)

=== 2005 ===
1. (Australia) Italiano Club Darwin (new team)

=== 2012 ===
Competition played in Dili.

=== 2013-14 ===
Competition started on 27 December 2013 and finished at the final match on 7 January 2014 in Dili. 8 team compete this season.

1. Timor A
2. Timor B (champions)
3. PNTL/F-FDTL
4. (Australia) Sydney
5. (Australia) Adelaide
6. (Australia) Darwin
7. (Australia) Melbourne
8. Portugal

== Champions ==
Year	Location	Winners	Score	Runners-up	References
2013-14	National Stadium, Dili	PNTL-FFDTL	0–3	Timor B	
