= Liceu Dr. Francisco Machado =

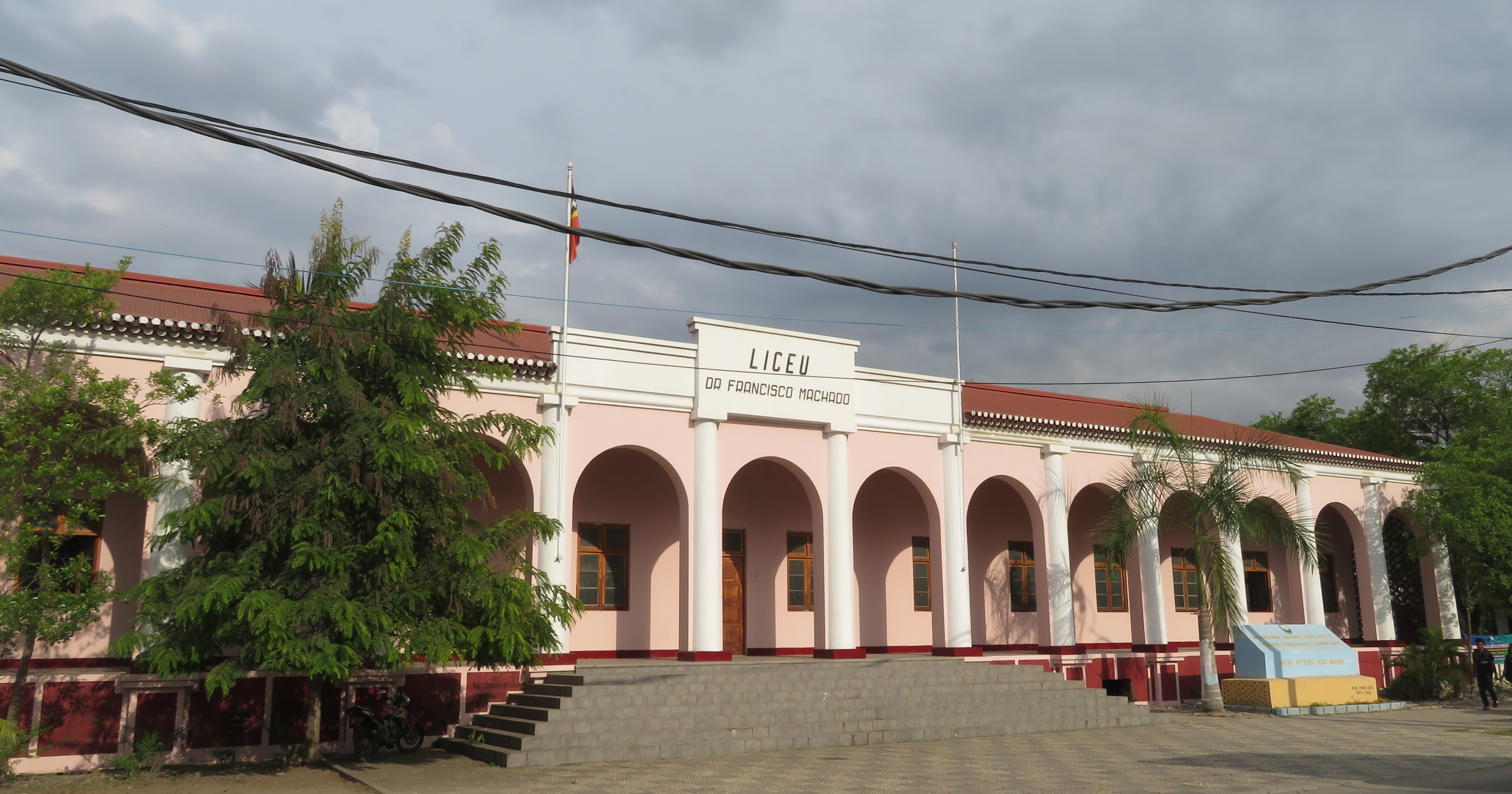
- The building in 2016
- Interactive map of the Liceu Dr. Francisco Machado area

General information
- Type: Educational facility
- Architectural style: Neoclassical / Portuguese colonial
- Location: Rua de Moçambique, Dili, East Timor
- Coordinates: 8°33′21″S 125°34′35″E
- Construction started: 1922
- Completed: 1924
- Renovated: 1952; 1955–56; 1961; 2001
- Owner: National University of East Timor

Technical details
- Material: Masonry

Website
- National University of East Timor

The Liceu Dr. Francisco Machado (Note: The expression Liceu Dr. Francisco Machado means "Dr Francisco Machado High School", but is usually not translated in English language sources) is a neoclassical Portuguese colonial school building in the Colmera suco of Dili, capital city of Timor-Leste. It is located one block west of the National Parliament of East Timor, and faces Rua de Moçambique (formerly Rua Dom Fernando). Today, it houses the Faculty of Education, Arts and Humanities of the Universidade Nacional Timor Lorosa'e.

== History ==
The school building was constructed between 1922 and 1924, and was originally occupied by the Dili Municipal School (Escola Municipal de Díli). By governmental decree of 22 January 1938, a new high school was founded to provide indigenous Timorese with sufficient education to allow them to enter the lower level of the public administration. It was installed in the school building, and named after Francisco Vieira Machado, the Portuguese Minister for the Colonies (1936–1944) who was responsible for its foundation. However, high school education could not be established at that time, because of the upheavals associated with World War II, during which Japanese forces invaded Timor, and the school building was one of the many buildings destroyed in the conflict.

In 1952, after the restoration of the building, the school opened its doors to its first high school pupils. In 1955 and 1956, the building was expanded according to a 1953 design by Eurico Pinto Lopes. Upon the opening of the high school, secondary education became available to the local population for the first time. However, the school was available primarily to mestiço (mixed-race people), despite a legal prohibition of discrimination. Attendees of the high school included the later freedom fighter and first Prime Minister of Timor-Leste, Nicolau Lobato, and the later Minister of Social Solidarity, Maria Domingas Alves. In 1961, the school building was enlarged on the basis of plans drawn up by Eurico Pinto Lopes and António Sousa Mendes. However, those plans were not fully implemented, as only the wing facing the Avenida Cidade de Lisboa (now Rua Formosa) and a new elementary school were built.

After the Indonesian invasion of East Timor, the building was no longer used for teaching purposes until 1979, when it started to house the Public School of Middle Education (in Indonesian: Sekolah Pendidikan Guru Negeri; SPGN). In 1986, on the verge of the creation of a university in Timor Timur, the technical teaching section of the SPGN merged with several other isolated teaching courses to give rise to the Faculty of Education of Universitas Timor Timur (now Universidade Nacional Timor Lorosa'e (UNTL)). The historic Liceu Dr. Francisco Machado building was donated to the new university, and the school previously housed in that building was transferred to the Becora neighborhood of Dili; it is now called the 28 de Novembro Secondary School.

During the 1999 East Timorese crisis, the building was destroyed by Aitarak, one of the pro-Indonesian militias. In 2001, the Lisbon city council financed its reconstruction. The building's exterior was rebuilt along the lines of the original design, but its interior was substantially modernised to house the Faculty of Education, Arts and Humanities of UNTL. As of 2019, the faculty was still located in the building.

== Architecture ==
In its original form, the building was classically Goan in style. It had whitewashed exterior walls and unframed windows, except those facing the interior gallery, which were framed in tones of dark wood. Its main entrance was surmounted by a flamboyant oriental-style pediment; a wide, pyramidal-shaped staircase led up to it. Flanking the original building was an arcaded exterior gallery protected by a balustrade. The exterior gallery had pillars separated by circular arches, with capitals at the base of each arch; the peripheral pillars were topped with Corinthian capitals supporting a frieze under a high entablature.

When the building was restored in the aftermath of World War II, it retained its basic architectonic structure. However, whitewash was not reapplied, and the decorations were radically altered to conform to a more Portuguese compositional style, with Macauan chromatic influences. Decorations were added to the door and window frames, entablature and pillars, and the socles and capitals were coloured.

The reconstruction in 2001 again maintained the architectonic features of the façade. Exterior alterations included replacement of the entablature by Portuguese-style eaves. Also removed were the balustrade and the capitals at the base of the arches, which were replaced by a dark base with inset pillars, and parallelepiped capitals supporting the frieze, respectively. Inside the building, more profound changes were made to clear the way for the restored function of the interior as a teaching space.
