= Gita Honwana-Welch =

Gita Honwana Welch is a freelance consultant in the field of international development aid and a former employee of the United Nations. On the basis of her varied national and international functions, she has been and is a participant and speaker at various conferences and working meetings. Honwana Welch comes from Mozambique.

== Career ==
Honwana Welch's parents are Raúl Honwana and his second wife Nely Nhaca. She first studied law at the University of Lisbon (1970-1973) and at the Eduardo Mondlane University in Maputo (1980-1982). She is considered to be the first Mozambican with a university degree in law. She holds a Master's degree in Law from Columbia University in New York and a Ph.D. in Law from Wolfson College, University of Oxford, in the fields of Law and specifically International Law. In her dissertation she dealt with the "Prohibition of Torture, Cruel Treatment, Inhuman and Degrading Treatment or Punishment in International Law", referring to the 1984 United Nations Convention against Torture.

In her home country Mozambique and in East Timor, she gained experience in rebuilding a judicial system in former crisis countries. In Mozambique, she worked as a public prosecutor from 1978, as a judge at the Maputo Provincial Court from July 1979 to July 1983, and as Director of the Investigation and Legislation Department at the Ministry of Justice until 1989. She then began working for the United Nations in the United Nations Development Programme (UNDP). Here, she was the representative for Southern Africa in the area of women.

In East Timor, Honwana Welch was Minister of Justice in the first transitional government under UN administration from 2000 to 2001. In New York at UNDP, Honwana Welch worked as Director of the Democratic Governance Group from 2001 to 2006, and in Angola as Country Director of UNDP from 2006 to 2010. From 2011 to 2013, she was Director of the UNDP Regional Service Centre for West and Central Africa in Dakar, Senegal. Since 2013, she has been working as an independent consultant. From January to April 2018, she served as acting Country Director of UNDP in Ghana.

== Publications ==
- Lobolo. 1983, (Master thesis)
- with Albie Sachs: Liberating the Law: Creating Popular Justice in Mozambique. Zed, London 1990, ISBN 0862329213
- The Prohibition of Torture, Cruel, Inhuman and Degrading Treatment or Punishment in International Law. University of Oxford, 1993 (1994 publiziert), (Doctoral thesis)
- Ayesha Kadwani Dias (pub.), Gita Honwana Welch (pub.): Justice for the poor: perspectives on accelerating access. Oxford University Press, New Delhi, Oxford 2009, ISBN 9780195692051

== See also ==
- List of first women lawyers and judges in Africa
