= Minister of Justice (Timor-Leste) =

East Timorese government minister

- Ministro da Justiça (Portuguese); Ministru Justisa (Tetum)
- Coat of Arms of Timor-Leste

- Flag of Timor-Leste

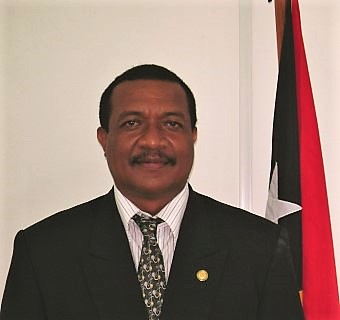
- Incumbent; Amândio Benevides since 1 July 2023
- Ministry of Justice
- Style: Minister (informal); His Excellency (formal, diplomatic)
- Member of: Constitutional Government
- Reports to: Prime Minister
- Appointer: President of Timor-Leste (following proposal by the Prime Minister of Timor-Leste)
- Inaugural holder: António Duarte Carvarino Mau Lear; (1975); Gita Honwana-Welch; (2000)
- Formation: 1975 / 2000
- Website: Ministry of Justice

The Minister of Justice (Portuguese: Ministro da Justiça, Tetum: Ministru Justisa) is a senior member of the Constitutional Government of Timor-Leste heading the Ministry of Justice.

== Functions ==
The Minister has the power and the duty:

1. to implement the policy defined for the Ministry of Justice;
2. to ensure relations between the Government and the other organs of the State in the area of responsibility of the Ministry.

Falling within those powers and duties are responsibilities such as overseeing the recruitment of judges, prosecutors, and public defenders.

Where the Minister is in charge of the subject matter of a government statute, the Minister is also required, together with the Prime Minister, to sign the statute.

== Incumbent ==
The incumbent minister is Amândio Benevides.

== List of ministers ==
The following individuals have been appointed as Minister of Justice:

No.	Party	Minister	Portrait	Government (Prime Minister)	Term start	Term end	Term in office
1	Fretilin	António Duarte Carvarino Mau Lear		1975 CoM (Lobato)	1 December 1975	17 December 1975	16 days
2	United Nations	Gita Honwana-Welch		I UNTAET (Vieira de Mello)	15 July 2000	20 September 2001	1 year, 67 days
3	Fretilin	Ana Maria Pessoa		II UNTAET (Alkatiri)	20 September 2001	20 May 2002	1 year, 180 days
3	Fretilin	Ana Maria Pessoa		I Constitutional (Alkatiri)	20 May 2002	19 March 2003	1 year, 180 days
4	Fretilin	Domingos Sarmento		I Constitutional (Alkatiri)	19 March 2003	10 July 2006	4 years, 142 days
4	Fretilin	Domingos Sarmento		II Constitutional (Ramos-Horta)	10 July 2006	19 May 2007	4 years, 142 days
4	Fretilin	Domingos Sarmento		III Constitutional (da Silva)	19 May 2007	8 August 2007	4 years, 142 days
5	PSD	Lúcia Lobato		IV Constitutional (Gusmão)	8 August 2007	March 2012 (suspended)	5 years, 0 days (incl. suspension)
(acting)	CNRT	Ivo Valente		IV Constitutional (Gusmão)	March 2012	8 August 2012	c. 145 days
6	CNRT	Dionísio Babo Soares		V Constitutional (Gusmão)	8 August 2012	16 February 2015	2 years, 192 days
7	CNRT	Ivo Valente		VI Constitutional (Araújo)	16 February 2015	3 October 2017	2 years, 229 days
8	UDT	Maria Ângela Guterres Viegas Carrascalão		VII Constitutional (Alkatiri)	3 October 2017	22 June 2018	262 days
9	Independent	Manuel Cárceres da Costa		VIII Constitutional (Ruak)	22 June 2018	22 March 2022	3 years, 273 days
10		Tiago Amaral Sarmento		VIII Constitutional (Ruak)	22 March 2022	1 July 2023	1 year, 101 days
11	CNRT	Amândio Benevides		IX Constitutional (Gusmão)	1 July 2023	20 January 2024	203 days
