= National Stadium (Timor-Leste) =

Stadium in Timor-Leste

National Stadium of Timor-Leste; Municipal Stadium of Dili
- Estádio Nacional de Timor-Leste; Estádio Municipal de Díli (Portuguese); Estadiu Nasional Timor-Leste; Estadiu Munisipal Díli (Tetun)
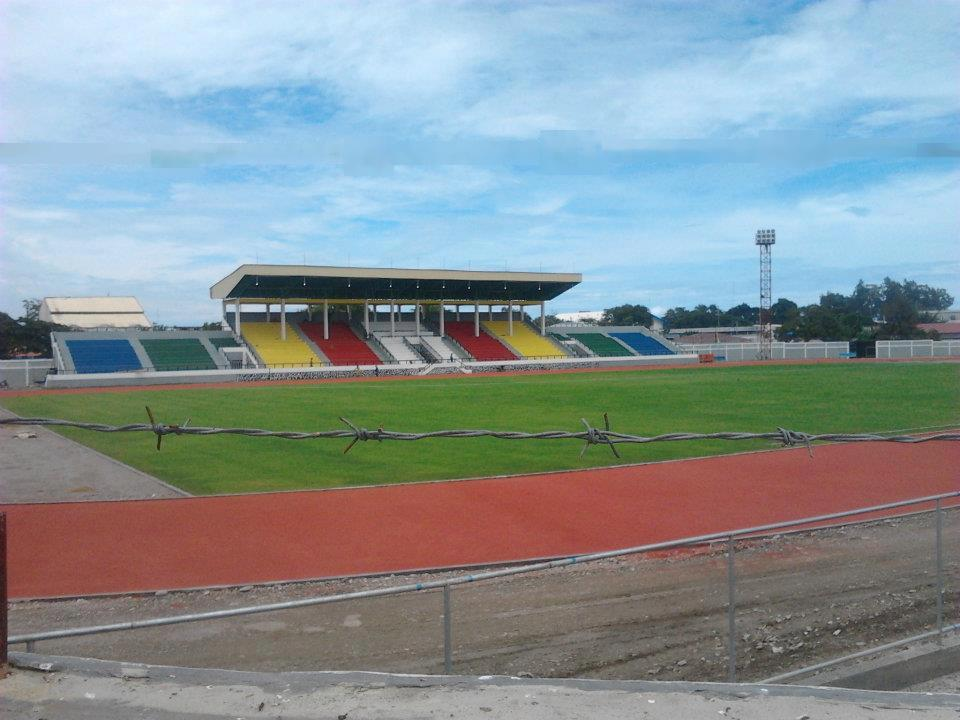
- Interactive map of: National Stadium of Timor-Leste; Municipal Stadium of Dili
- Full name: National Stadium of Timor-Leste; (or Municipal Stadium of Dili)
- Address: Avenida Xavier do Amaral; Dili, Timor-Leste
- Coordinates: 8°33′29″S 125°34′50″E
- Operator: Federação de Futebol de Timor-Leste
- Capacity: 5,000
- Surface: Grass
- Field size: 105×68 m
- Current use: Football

Construction
- Opened: 1980
- Renovated: 2025
- Expanded: 2011

Tenants
- Timor Leste national football team Liga Futebol Timor-Leste

The National Stadium of Timor-Leste (Portuguese: Estádio Nacional de Timor-Leste, Tetun: Estadiu Nasional Timor Lorosa'e), also known as the Municipal Stadium of Dili (Portuguese: Estádio Municipal de Díli, Tetun: Estadiu Munisipal Díli), is a multi-purpose stadium in Dili, Timor-Leste.

The stadium has a capacity of 5,000 and is used mostly for football matches. Though it is the nominal home ground of the Timor Leste national football team, facility issues have led to it being usually unfit for international tournaments, forcing the national team to play their home matches on neutral grounds abroad.

== History ==
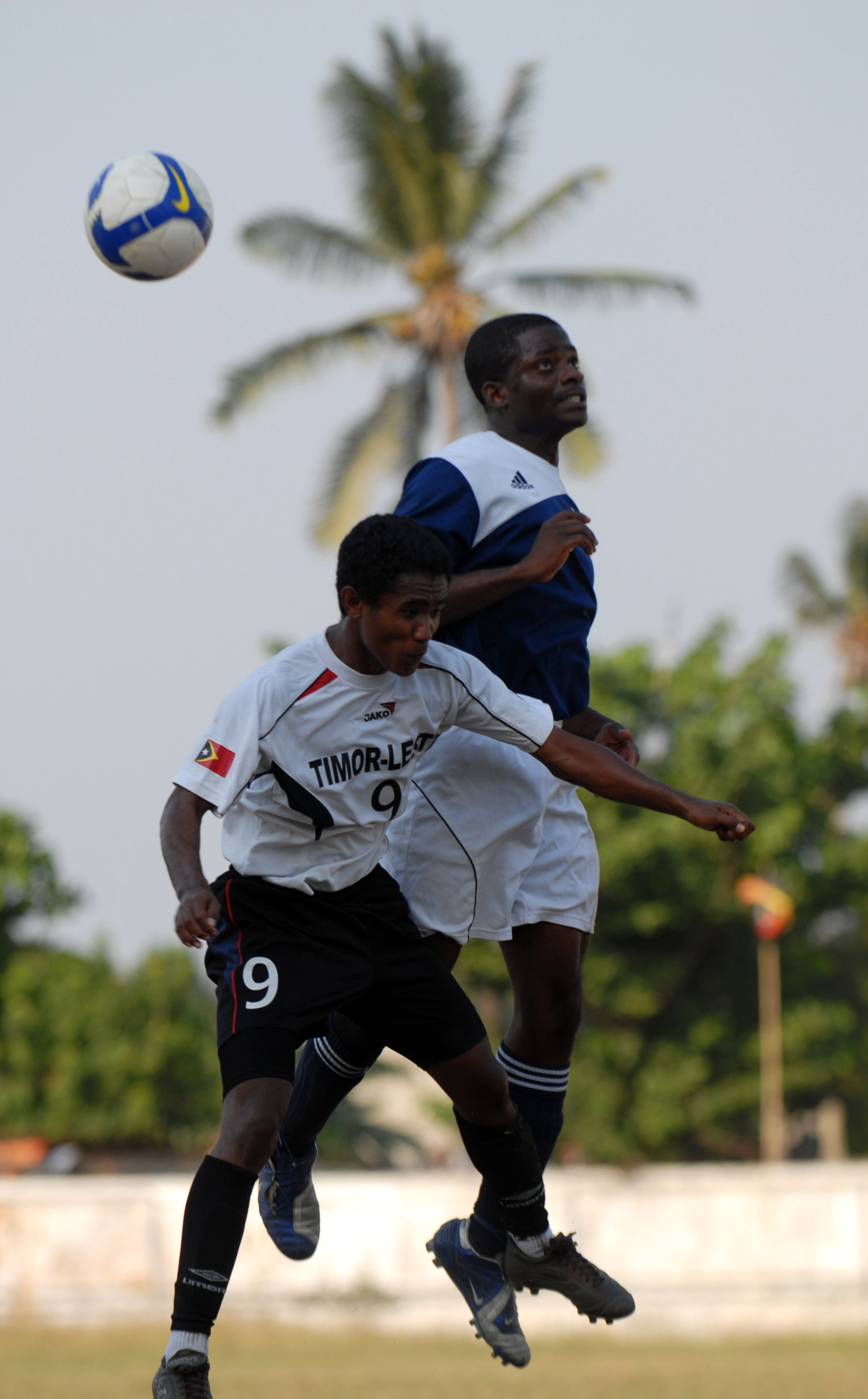
Soccer game between Timor-Leste's U-17 National team and U.S. Navy

In 1999-2000, during the 1999 East Timorese crisis and its aftermath, the stadium was used as a makeshift refugee camp and emergency relief distribution point.

On 21 December 1999, the stadium hosted the Tour of Duty – Concert for the Troops, featuring Kylie Minogue and John Farnham, for the Australian troops serving with the International Force for East Timor (INTERFET).

Since 2004, the stadium has been home to the finals of the Super Liga Timorense, the Taça Digicel, and, more recently, the Taça 12 de Novembro and the Liga Futebol Amadora / Timor-Leste.

In 2005, world-renowned soccer player Cristiano Ronaldo visited Dili stadium and posed for a picture with the President, Xanana Gusmão.

In 2006, the stadium once again housed a refugee camp, for over 1,000 displaced people.

A tournament held between East Timorese national teams, a UN Police team and Australian and New Zealand combined teams was held in May 2007.

During the 2010s, the stadium was renovated in two separate projects, commenced in 2011 and 2016, respectively. The 2011 renovations were inaugurated in April 2012 by the then Prime Minister of Timor-Leste, Xanana Gusmão.

On 12 March 2015, the stadium hosted the first international home match of the Timor-Leste national football team in the first round 2018 FIFA World Cup qualification against Mongolia with Timor winning 4–1.

The 2016 renovations were valued at US$1.64 million, and included the renovation of the grandstand, construction of bathrooms, electricity rooms, and lighting poles, and adding seats to the grandstand. As of mid-2019, those renovations had not yet been completed.

On 20 September 2019, to commemorate the 20th anniversary of the formation of INTERFET task force, friendly football matches were played at the stadium between teams of Falintil and Interfet veterans, and between the Timor-Leste national team and an Australian Defence Force team.

In February 2021, the Board of Directors of the Infrastructure Fund (Portuguese: Conselho da Administração do Fundo das Infraestruturas (CAFI)) approved an additional budget of more than US$300,000 to complete the 2016 renovations.

On 13 June 2022, the Minister of Justice, Tiago Amaral Sarmento, met with the East Timor Football Federation (FFTL), as representative of the International Association Football Federation (FIFA), and handed over documentation assigning the site of the stadium, including land known as Kampo Demokrasia, to the FFTL. The assignment, for a price to be agreed later, was made in connection with a long-term contract between the parties, under which the stadium and other football fields in Timor-Leste would be brought up to international standards, at FIFA's expense.

Just under a year later, on 8 June 2023, the Secretary of State for Youth and Sport, Abrão Saldanha, announced that FIFA had agreed to build two international standard football stadiums in Timor-Leste, one of them at the National Stadium, and the other at the Xanana Sports Center. He also said that the two stadium designs had been finalised and analysed by a FIFA technical team, and that after data verification was complete, FIFA would call tenders for construction.

In 2025, the stadium undergo a renovation in preparation for hosting the 2025 CPLP Games.

== Facilities ==
The stadium has an athletics track, which has been used for training for the Summer Olympic Games. There are two grandstands on the Eastern and Western sides of the field; the main grandstand has a roof. Total capacity of the stadium is 5,000 people.

Due to problems with the stadium's infrastructure, the national football team must sometimes play its home games in other countries. For example, in the first rounds of the 2026 FIFA World Cup AFC qualification and 2027 AFC Asian Cup qualification (which double up as each other), Timor-Leste played both its home and away games at the National Stadium in Kaohsiung, Taiwan rather than the home game being played domestically.

== Major matches ==
12 March 2015	Timor-Leste	4–1	Mongolia
	Chiquito 4', 7'; Rodrigo 84'; Jairo Neto 85'	Report	Erkhembayar 87'	Attendance: 9,000; Referee: Sivakorn Pu-Udom (Thailand)

17 November 2015	Timor-Leste	0–10	Saudi Arabia
		Report (FIFA); Report (AFC)	Al-Sahlawi 29' (pen.), 42', 55' (pen.), 70', 89'; Osama H. 34'; Al-Shehri 35'; Al-Jassim 85'; Hazazi 90'; Al-Muwallad 90+2'	Attendance: 2,000; Referee: Alan Milliner (Australia)
