= Universidade da Paz =

Universities in Timor Leste

Coordinates: 8.5650°S 125.5478°E

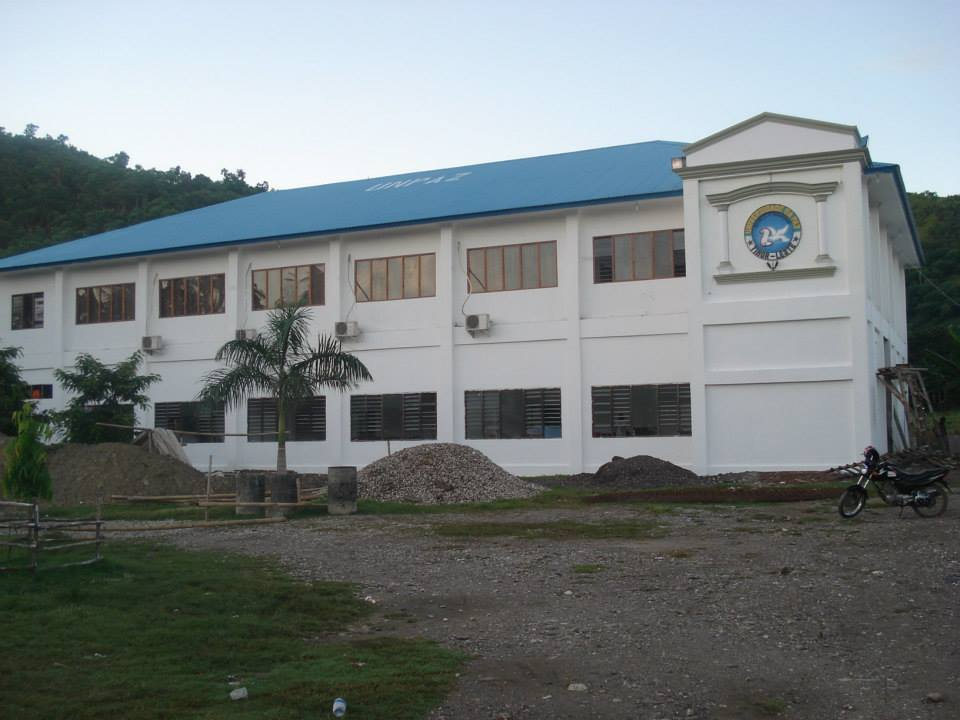
- Universidade da Paz campus in Dili
- Other name: UNPAZ
- Established: 2004
- Rector: Dr. Lucas da Costa
- Students: 2,615
- Undergraduates: 2,615
- Location: Dili, Timor Leste
- Website: unpaz.tl

Universidade da Paz (UNPAZ) is a private university in Dili, Timor-Leste.

== Background ==
UNPAZ was one of a number of universities that emerged after Timor-Leste's independence from Indonesia in 1999. It was founded after unresolved internal issues with UNDIL (Universidade Dili) in Masquerinhas. For its first few months, it operated from temporary premises before purchasing land to build a new campus southwest of the city centre. By 2005, most of the main campus buildings were established, and several hundred students were attending classes taught by returning expatriates and local Timorese. Most of the student body were participants in the struggle for Timorese independence, including ex-Falintil guerrillas, who had been denied a university education during the conflict before 1999.

The founding and former rector was Prof. Lucas da Costa (d. 2019), a Timorese economist, who also served as a member of parliament for the Partidu Demokratiku (PD). It is now Adolmando Soares Amaral. Former lecturers include Dr. Jacqueline Aquino Siapno (later of Seoul National University, returned 2023), the ex-wife of politician Fernando de Araújo, and environmental scientist Demetrio do Amaral de Carvalho, the 2004 Goldman Environmental Prize winner.

== Current status ==
The university offers degrees in several disciplines, including social science, public health, engineering, and the sciences. Its faculties include Public Health, Engineering, and Agricultural Technology. It has over 150 Instructors, many on part-time contracts but few with doctorates, and 3,500 students. There is an outreach program to teach in East Timor's rural districts. Campus expansion and development is supported by grants from the European Commission.

UNPAZ faces challenges common to other Timorese universities. The university sector in the country was totally destroyed by violence in the late 1990s and is not yet fully rebuilt, meaning a lack of tertiary education resources and trained personnel. The language of instruction at UNPAZ varies and has been primarily Bahasa Indonesia. It has received some national and international financial assistance but relies largely on student fees. It is building up library resources, partly with international assistance. Internet connections were poor for several years.

A 2010 report on science education in East Timor notes the considerable lack of human and physical resources for teaching STEM subjects and that, at UNPAZ, laboratory facilities exist for each science subject but are not fully equipped.

== Notable alumni ==
- Armanda Berta dos Santos (2012): politician, president of KHUNTO, Deputy Prime Minister of Timor-Leste (2020–2023)

== See also ==
- List of universities in Timor-Leste
