= Maria Domingas Alves =

East Timorese activist

Maria Domingas Fernandes Alves
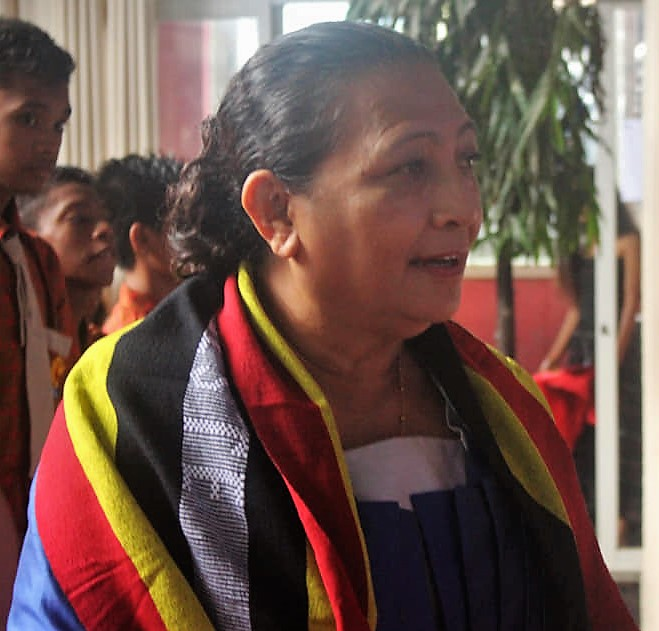

Director, Office for the Promotion of Equality
- In office May 2002 – June 2006

Minister of Social Solidarity
- In office 8 August 2007 – 8 August 2012
- Succeeded by: Isabel Guterres

Personal details
- Born: 28 November 1959 (age 66) Laclo, Manatuto, Portuguese Timor
- Profession: Women's rights activist, civil servant

Maria Domingas Fernandes Alves (born 28 November 1959), nickname Mana (sister) Micato or Mikato, resistance name Beta Mau, is a women's rights activist, former resistance fighter, civil servant and non-party politician from East Timor. From 2007 to 2012 she was Minister of Social Solidarity.

== Early life ==
Alves was born in Laclo, Manatuto. Her father was chief of a sub-district in Portuguese Timor, and then a member of the parliament of Manatuto during the Indonesian occupation of East Timor. Alves attended the Liceu Dr. Francisco Machado, Dili. She is married to Jacinto Alves, with whom she had four daughters and a son.

== Resistance careers ==
During the Indonesian occupation of East Timor (1975-1999), Alves was one of the main female leaders of the resistance movement, especially around Laclubar and Laclo. She participated actively in the Organização Popular de Mulheres Timorense (Popular Organisation of East Timorese Women) (OPMT), the women's organization of FRETILIN. In 1978, Alves and her husband were arrested in the mountains and taken to Metinaro for interrogation. They were released after about sixteen days, and sent to Dili, where Alves worked as a civil servant in the Indonesian Industry and Trade Authority from 1983-1999. In 1997, she co-founded the women's rights organization Forum for Communication for East Timorese Women (FOKUPERS), and campaigned for independence in the run-up to the 1999 East Timorese independence referendum.

== Political career ==
In 2000, Alves organized the first National Women's Congress. In the interim government under United Nations Transitional Administration in East Timor (UNTAET), Alves became a gender equality adviser on September 30, 2001. The same year, Alves was selected by Rede Feto, a network of about 15 women’s organisations, to stand as an independent candidate in the first parliamentary elections, but she was not elected to the national parliament of East Timor. Instead, she became an adviser to the Prime Minister on promoting equality, and in 2002, she was appointed director of the Office for the Promotion of Equality, a role she held until June 2006, when she was the first holder of public office to resign during the 2006 East Timorese crisis. In 2005, Alves was nominated for the Nobel Peace Prize in recognition of her role in the independence movement and her work for the rights of women. From May 2005 to 2007, Alves was an appointed member of the Council of State (Portuguese: Conselho de Estado), which advises the President of East Timor.

From 8 August 2007 to 8 August 2012, Alves was Minister of Social Solidarity in the IV Government of East Timor, with Xanana Gusmão as president. In 2012, under a new government, it was reportedly proposed that she would be appointed Minister of Defence and Security, but according to press reports, President Taur Matan Ruak, who was a former military commander in chief of the army, opposed her appointment. Alves allegedly rejected a return to her old ministerial post because of the "insult". On October 23, 2012, Prime Minister Xanana Gusmão was finally sworn in as Minister of Defence.

Alves was appointed a commissioner of the Civil Service Commission (Comissão da Função Pública) on 29 May 2015.

== Awards ==
On November 28, 2006, Alves received from the government the Nicolau Lobato Order for her participation and contribution to the liberation of East Timor.

== Publications ==
- c. 2004 - Written with blood, by Maria Domingas Fernandes Alves with Laura Soares Abrantes and Filomena B Reis. Dili : Office for Promotion of Equality. OCLC 938443638
