= Ministry of Justice (Timor-Leste) =

Ministry in the government of East Timor

- Ministério da Justiça (Portuguese); Ministeriu Justisa (Tetum)
- Coat of arms of Timor-Leste

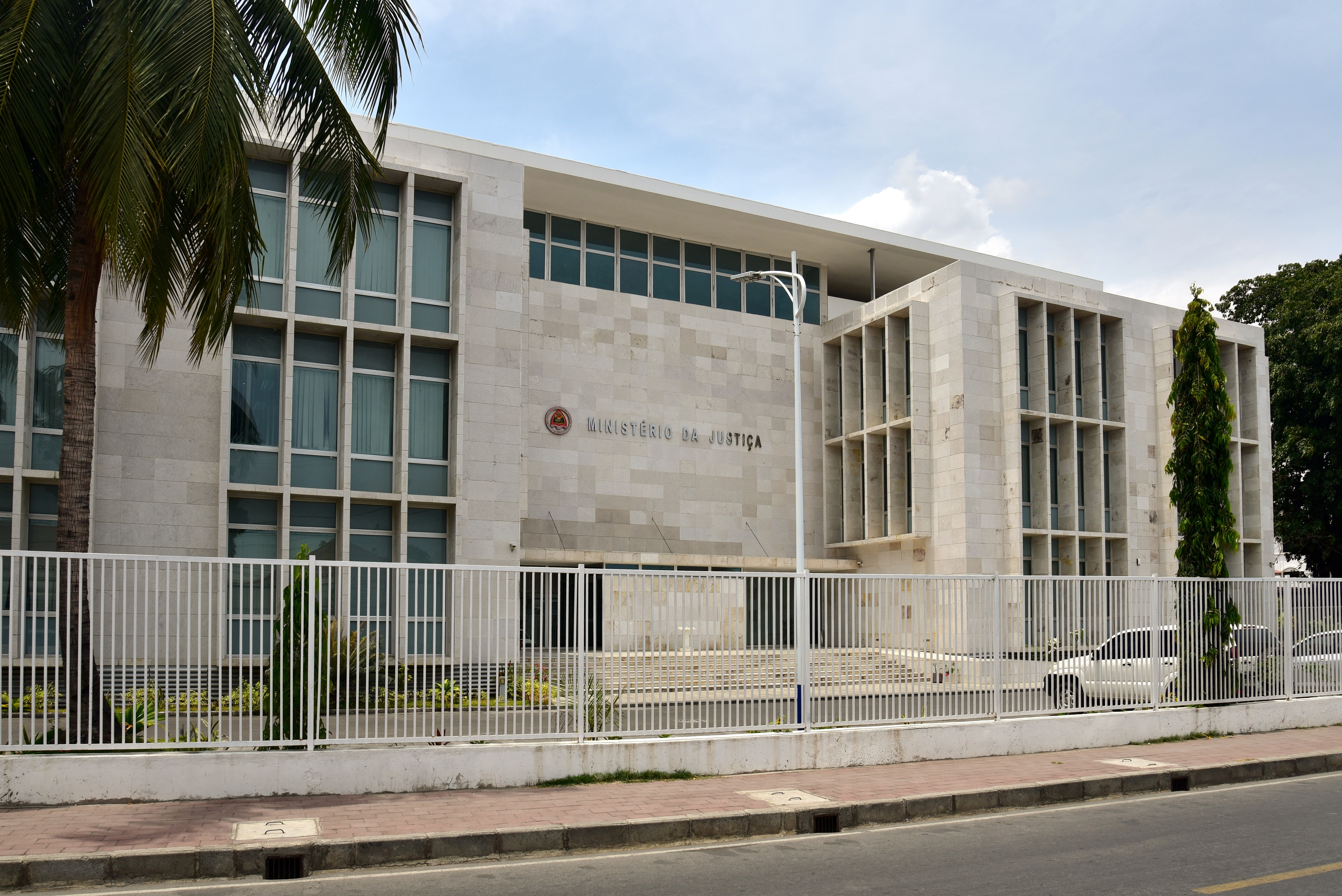
- Headquarters of the Ministry

Ministry overview
- Formed: 1975 / 2000 / 2002
- Jurisdiction: Government of Timor-Leste
- Headquarters: Rua da Justiça, Dili; 8°33′23″S 125°34′31″E
- Minister responsible: Amândio Benevides, Minister of Justice
- Website: Ministry of Justice
- Agency ID: MJ

The Ministry of Justice (MJ; Portuguese: Ministério da Justiça, Tetum: Ministeriu Justisa) is the government department of Timor-Leste accountable for the administration of justice.

== Functions ==
The Ministry is responsible for the design, implementation, coordination and evaluation of policy for the following areas:

- justice
- law and human rights
- land and property

In 2011, the Ministry established a protocol with the East Timor Bar Association in order to ensure the proper training of lawyers.

== Minister ==
The incumbent Minister of Justice is Amândio Benevides.

== See also ==
- List of justice ministries
- Politics of Timor-Leste
