= José Honório =

East Timorese politician (1973–2026)

Minister of Higher Education, Science and Culture
- In office 1 July 2023 – 21 April 2026
- Prime Minister: Xanana Gusmão
- Preceded by: Longuinhos dos Santos
- Succeeded by: TBD

Personal details
- Born: José Honório da Costa Pereira Jerónimo; 15 February 1973 Bazartete, Liquiçá, Timor
- Died: 21 April 2026 (aged 53) Dili, East Timor

José Honório da Costa Pereira Jerónimo (15 February 1973 – 21 April 2026) was an East Timorese university lecturer and politician.

== Life and career ==
Honório was born in Bazartete, Liquiçá on 15 February 1973. He was the Minister of Higher Education, Science and Culture, serving from July 2023 in the IX Constitutional Government of Timor-Leste led by Prime Minister Xanana Gusmão.

Honório died on 21 April 2026 at the age of 53, at the Guido Valadares National Hospital in Dili, where he had been admitted after suffering a heart attack.
