= UNDP Angola =

United Nations Development Programme
- Abbreviation: UNDP
- Type: Programme
- Legal status: Active
- Website: http://mirror.undp.org/angola/

United Nations Development Programme (UNDP) in Angola is one of the 166 country offices of the United Nations Development Programme’s global network, and is located in the country’s capital Luanda. Its stated objective is to empower people's lives and help nations to become stronger and more resilient. As a part of the wider UNDP’s development efforts, the local office is responsible for the implementation of the Millennium Development Goals in Angola. Specific areas of focus for Angola are poverty reduction, democratic governance, environment and energy, and crisis prevention and recovery. Other development projects target education and HIV/AIDS prevention and treatment.

== Key areas in Angola ==
=== Poverty reduction ===
A priority for the Angolan Government and the development organizations and NGOs operating in the country continues to be the reduction of poverty, particularly of extreme poverty. On February 11th, 2004 the government approved the “Estratégia de Combate à Pobreza” (ECP). The current version is the revised September 2005 edition, and it is still the main strategy development document for poverty reduction in Angola. It states the focus areas of intervention for government and non-governmental and global actors is reconstruction of infrastructures, increased access to education, health, and other basic services, as well as the decentralization of governance structures.

=== Environment ===
In 2013, UNDP contributed US$1.1 million to a mainly EU-funded project aimed at protecting biodiversity in Angola.

=== Crisis prevention and recovery ===
Although hostilities ended in 2002, landmines and Explosive Remnants of War (ERW) left from the conflict continue to pose threats to a large number of Angolans. Black markets for firearms are a source of prolonged armed violence in communities throughout greater portions of the country. The UNDP effort to eradicate such man-made threats is mainly through the Capacity Development for the National Mine Action Authority (CNIDAH), and the creation of a Rapid Response Fund for demining efforts. Natural disasters, such as droughts pose other threats - particularly to agricultural communities.
