= Universidade Dili =

University in East Timor

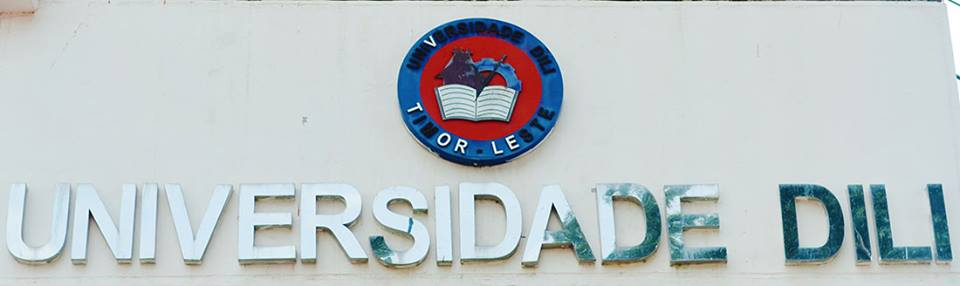
- Type: Private
- Established: 20 May 2002; 23 years ago
- Rector: José Belo
- Location: Dili, Timor-Leste
- Campus: Urban
- Website: undil.tl

Universidade Dili (UNDIL) is a private university in Dili, the capital of Timor-Leste.

== Rectors ==
- Lucas da Costa (2000–2003)
- José A. da C. B. Pereira (interim; 2003–2004)
- Sebastião Dias Ximenes (2004–2005)
- Domingos Savio (2006–2007)
- Arlindo Marçal (2007–2010)
- António Cardoso C. Machado (2010–2015)
- Cosme Fatima B. da Silva (interim; 2015)
- Estevão da Costa Belo (2015–2018)
- José Belo (2019–present)

== See also ==
- List of universities in Timor-Leste
