= Polygamy in Ghana =

Marriage

Polygamy is illegal in Ghana, but the restrictions are not heavily enforced. Polygamous marriages are illegal under civil law, though they are arguably considered lawful under customary law . Despite these exceptions, there have been no reports of a legally contracted polygamous marriage in Ghana; and they are considered "de facto" illegal. An estimated 22% of Ghanaian women live polygamously.

== Polygamy origin ==
Polygamy has been around and practiced for centuries by cultures from all over the world, but there is no exact location of its beginning. It was believed to be more prevalent in places where colonial economic gains centered on subsistence farming (e.g. Africa). This agriculture is self-sufficient in which farmers focus mainly on growing food to feed themselves and their families. Another factor for its start was war. When numerous men die in combat, having more than one wife boosts the population. A person's status in society and wealth became associated with the number of wives a man had. On the contrary, polyandry was a way of limiting a population with few resources and too many people. A woman can only conceive and give birth to so many children, no matter how many husbands she has/had.

== Laws and religion in Ghana ==
Currently (2015), polygamy is illegal in Ghana, although laws against this practice are not heavily enforced against those who choose to live it. Polygamous marriages are illegal under civil law. They are arguably considered to be legal under customary law. Men in polygamous marriages can more easily transfer the costs of childbearing and rearing to women. The religions that consist in Ghana currently are 12 percent Muslim, 38 percent traditionalist, 41 percent Christian, and the rest (about 9 percent) other. There were points of conflict in terms of marriage where the Islamic and traditional beliefs support polygamy while Christian beliefs support monogamy against polygamy. Nevertheless, religious tolerance in Ghana is very high. With that, polygamy has existed all over Africa because it represents aspects of their religion and culture. Polygamous unions have been more present in Africa like no other continent around the globe.

== Who and why? ==
The earliest study of polygyny in Ghana focused on only rural urban residence and its relationship to polygyny. The study showed that the incidence of polygyny was about the same in both urban and rural areas. This was because at that time, life in rural and urban areas was not marriage type selective. Those who could afford and maintain more than one wife, or those, who because of their occupation such as farming, trading and laundry saw advantages of the lifestyle, usually were those who practiced polygyny.

Polygamy in Africa was viewed as a way a family could build an empire. The extent of spousal communication about contraception, which is positively associated with the level of use, is also lower among polygamous spouses. Therefore, one of the reasons polygamy is popular is because African societies see children as a form of wealth and this way a family with more children was considered more powerful.

== Prevalence of polygamy in Ghana ==
Polygamy has always been a significant institution in African society and continues to be the "most distinctive feature of African marriage" (Garenne and Van De Walle, 1989, p. 267). It was only after the colonial era in Africa appeared when polygamy started being looked at as a taboo. It is also said that there was an economic factor why this happened: there were issues of property ownership that conflicted with European colonial interest. Sub-Saharan Africa is the only region in the world where polygamy remains widespread.

Estimates of the prevalence of polygamy in African societies range from 20 to 50 percent of all marriages. At first polygamy in western Africa was very popular, but as Islam has started to diffuse in this region, the prevalence of polygamy has significantly lowered due to the restriction that appeared to the number of wives a man could have. Later the country was influenced by Christianity which has the ideal of monogamy.
