= Instituto Católico para Formação de Professores =

The Instituto Católico para Formação de Professores (ICFP), also referred to in English as the Catholic Teachers' College, is a teachers' college in Baucau, Timor-Leste.

The College was founded in 2001 by the international teaching congregation, the Marist Brothers, at the request of the Bishop of Baucau. At that time it was the only dedicated, internationally organised provider of primary teacher education in East Timor. Brother Mark Paul was the Director in 2001.

In 2003 the College accepted its first group of student teachers. Prior to 2000, 90% of teachers were from Indonesia. The Institute accepts applications from all the thirteen districts based on final Year 12 results plus an entrance interview.

A three-year Primary Teacher Training course is available at the Baucau Teachers College. This institution is accredited through the Australian Catholic University in Melbourne. The cost for each student is around $1000 AUD per year. This cost covers all course costs, travel to and from home, food and accommodation and books.

Young people from all areas of East Timor who have an interest in teaching as a career are admitted. They need to provide references from local leaders in their village like School Principals, Parish Priests and Village Chiefs.

A Scholarship Commission consisting of three people of standing in the Ermera District was set up in 2007. The Commission has also been allocating scholarships to encourage girls from needy families to stay in high school. The Scholarship Commission monitors the progress of the scholarship recipients.

Brother Fons van Rooij was the director in 2014.

== Milestones ==
On 18 November 2006 the Australian Catholic University honoured its first teaching graduates in East Timor, with ACU-accredited degrees from the College. A group of 48 graduates received their Bachelor of Teaching (Primary) in a ceremony held in Baucau. Six other students received certificates and postgraduate qualifications in front of an audience, which included the Prime Minister of East Timor Jose Ramos-Horta.

By 2016, 500 students had graduated through the college. The director at the time was Brother Peter Corr. The college is now called the "Instituto Catolico para a Formacao de Professores".

Between 2001 and 2016, 267 women have completed a degree in teaching with the help of scholarships. Many of these scholarships have been provided by the Emerge Foundation, an Australian NGO.

In 2017 the College was given permission by the Ministry of Education to begin a fourth year of instruction, leading to a Bachelor of Education that is the equivalent to a similar degree in Australia.

== See also ==
- List of universities in Timor-Leste
