= 28 de Novembro Secondary School =

28 de Novembro Public Secondary School

Location
- Complex of Educational Buildings of Becora, Becora Suco, Cristo Rei Posto; Dili; Timor-Leste; 8.5647°S 125.6032°E

Information
- Established: 1915; 111 years ago
- Director: Marcelino Caldas

The 28 de Novembro Public Secondary School (Portuguese: Escola Secundária Pública 28 de Novembro, ESP 28 de Novembro) is a Timorese educational institution based in Becora, in Dili, the country's capital. It is one of the largest educational institutions in East Timor.

== Historic ==
Academic tradition argues that this school is the successor to one of the first formal education institutions in the country, which still dates from the colonial period.

=== Foundation ===
Thus, ESP 28 de Novembro would be a descendant of the Municipal School of Dili (Portuguese: Escola Municipal de Dili), opened in 1915, at the initiative of the colonial governor, designed to standardize and formalize teaching in Portuguese Timor.

This establishment, until then only for primary education, would be replaced by Decree No. 28431, of 22 January 1938, which converted it into a Dili Lyceum-High School (Portuguese: Colégio-Liceu de Dili), giving classes for primary and secondary education. The Japanese invasion of 1942 destroyed the school buildings and caused the institution to stop activities.

On 31 May 1952 the school was reopened with the reconstruction of the classrooms, being called Dr. Francisco Machado Lyceum (Portuguese: Liceu Dr. Francisco Machado; LFM), by means of Law No. 43330 of 18 November 1952.

As of 1 October 1960, the Ministry of Overseas also assigned the high school the functions of a technical school, being able to issue diplomas of commerce and agriculture, under a coeducation regime (tutored jointly by the Government of Timor and the Diocese of Dili). At the height of the mid-1960s, the institution still housed mostly Portuguese children, with very few Timorese having access to education, a situation that would change only from 1972/1973.

With the advent of the educational reforms of the 1970s, the first democratic ones, the LFM is totally under the control of the State, excluding the joint tutelage of the Catholic Church.

=== Indonesian occupation period ===
In 1975, when FRETILIN proclaimed the independence of Timor, the LFM had around 300 students. However, it was still the only high school institution in the new country.

The Indonesian invasion and subsequent occupation was harmful to education in East Timor, primarily because it destroyed all educational establishments (including the Lyceum), and; secondly, because it excluded the Timorese population from access to formal education, making it possible, in 1999, to register the frightening indicator that 90% of the population was illiterate.

In 1979, the Indonesian Ministry of Education refunds the high school (setting it up in its old building) giving it the name of Public School of Middle Education (Indonesian: Sekolah Pendidikan Guru Negeri; SPGN). The institution was reformulated, in the principles of pancasila, so that it trained secondary school students and also technicians in teaching, forming two distinct sections.

In 1986, on the verge of the creation of a university in Timor Timur, the technical teaching section of the SPGN merged with several other isolated teaching courses to give rise to the Faculty of Education of UnTim (now UNTL). The historic "Dr. Francisco Machado Lyceum building" was donated to the new university.

Then, the Indonesian government, that same year (1986), transferred to the newly built Complex of Educational Buildings of Becora the section of the secondary education of the SPNG, giving the institution the name of Becora Secondary School (Indonesian: Sekolah Menengah Atas Becora; SMA-B), making her heir to the former Dr. Francisco Machado Lyceum.

=== 1999–present ===
In 1999, due to the result of the referendum that confirmed Timor's independence, a wave of violence followed that destroyed the Becora School, as well as most of the country's educational establishments.

In 2001, during UNTAET's term, classes at the School resumed, with the partial renovation of the Becora educational building complex.

In 2002, with the advent of full independence for East Timor, the Becora Secondary School gets a new name, changing its name to the "28 de Novembro Public Secondary School", in honor of the 28th of November 1975, when Xavier do Amaral made the nation's first proclamation of independence.

In that same year (2002), several student strikes paralyzed the normal functioning of the School, due to alleged arbitrary arrests of students, by the security forces, forcing the government to request intervention in the establishment.

In 2009, the Becora Police and the East Timor Defence Forces renovated the ESP 28 de Novembro building.
