= Universidade Nacional Timor Lorosa'e =

Public university in East Timor

National University of Timor-Leste
- Universidade Nacional Timor Lorosa'e (Portuguese); Universidade Nasionál Timor Lorosa'e (Tetun)
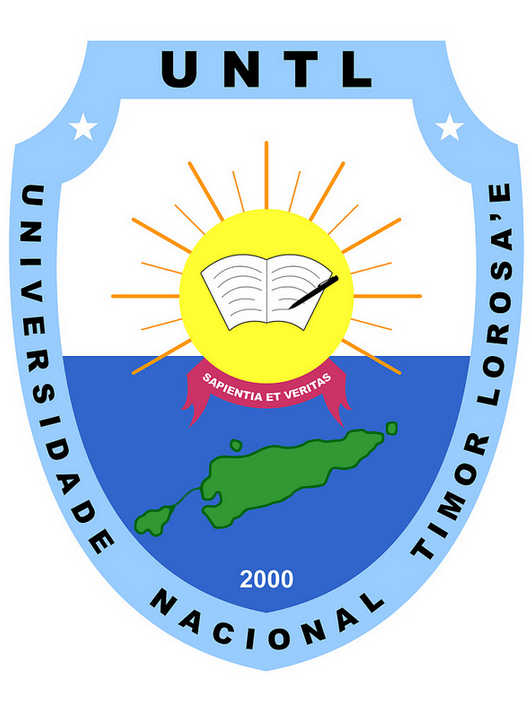
- Motto: Sapientia et Veritas
- Motto in English: "Wisdom and Truth"
- Type: Public
- Established: 1986 (as Universitas Timor Timur); 17 November 2000; 26 years ago (as UNTL)
- Rector: Joviano António da Costa
- Location: Dili, Timor-Leste
- Campus: Urban
- Website: www.untl.edu.tl

The National University of Timor-Leste (UNTL; Portuguese: Universidade Nacional Timor Lorosa'e; Tetum: Universidade Nasionál Timor Lorosa'e), is a public university in Timor-Leste, the only one of its kind in the country.

Founded in 2000, as a result of the nation's independence, its history can be traced, through the Faculty of Education, to the Portuguese colonial period, when the first public higher schools prepared for teachers appeared.

With six campuses, nine colleges, and seven research centers, it is the largest university in Timor-Leste in terms of the number of students, university professors, and budget. Forming the country's intellectual elite, it is also a national reference in teaching, research, and extension, the tripods of higher education. In 2017, the university was classified by the Webometrics Ranking of World Universities as the best university in the country.

It is a multilingual university, being the largest research center in Tetum, one of the two official languages of East Timor, but its classes are taught primarily in Portuguese. It has several campuses in Dili, the national capital, as well as in Hera.

== History ==
=== Pre-independence ===
The history of higher education in the country began in the time of Portuguese Timor, when on May 15, 1965, through Ordinance No. 3616, by governor José Alberty Correia, the Teacher Training School Engenheiro Canto Resende (also called Dili Post School; in Portuguese: Escola de Habilitação de Professores Engenheiro Canto Resende-EHPECR) was created, who should be concerned with the training of primary school teachers, with specialization in Portuguese language and basic calculations. On May 24, 1975, the Teacher Training School Engenheiro Canto Resende was extinguished, giving way to the General Course of Teaching and Training of Teachers of Preparatory Education (in Portuguese: Curso Geral de Magistério e Formação de Professores do Ensino Preparatório); when the invasion of Indonesia occurred on December 7, 1975, the General Course was closed and teacher training in Timorese territory was interrupted.

With the extinction of the only higher school in Timor, the island was left without training of minimum teaching staff, including for teaching Indonesian (the only official language allowed after the occupation), a fact that led the Indonesian government to recreate, in 1979, the General Course in its old structure, under the name Educational Course for Teachers; the institution was fully transferred to UnTim when it was created, constituting the Faculty of Education.

=== Indonesian occupation ===
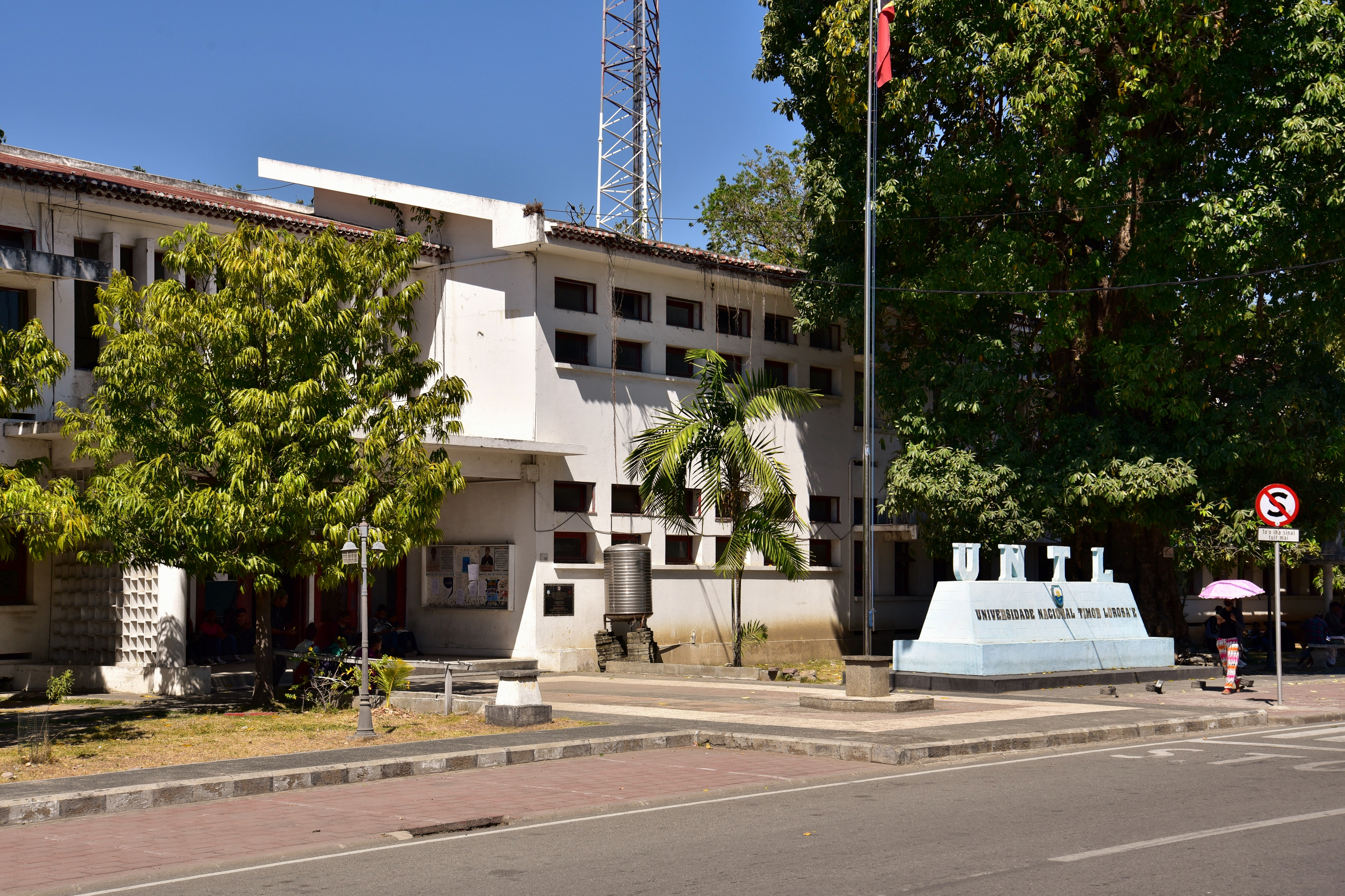
National University of East Timor, Central Campus, in 2023

On October 1, 1986, in the midst of Indonesian occupation, on the initiative of the then governor Mário Viegas Carrascalão and the Loro Sae Foundation, Universitas Timor Timur (UNTIM or UnTim) was founded.

The university existed largely to train middle-level administrators, agricultural extension workers and secondary school teachers. It was not a research institution and critical and analytical thought was not encouraged. Professional courses such as architecture, law and medicine were not taught. The study of English was carefully controlled and international contacts discouraged. Only a tiny minority used computers. Indonesian history was taught but little about other countries in the region.

Aid for tertiary education was largely for scholarships in East Timor and abroad, rather than improving overall teacher training or curriculum. Many students traveled abroad for their tertiary education, largely to Indonesia. There were problems of language and often undergraduates were unable to meet overseas entry requirements.

By 1998/99 UNTIM had nearly 4,000 students, with 73 permanent teaching staff, in three main faculties — Agriculture, Social & Political Sciences and Education & Teacher Training.

In 1995–98, at a time of escalating instability in East Timor and Indonesia, Georgetown University and USAID established the first international assistance project for UNTIM. The project involved developing staff teaching and management skills and improving curriculum. It established three new student resource centers (a teaching farm, an English-language center and a biology lab) and acquired up-to-date books, teaching materials and equipment for staff and students.

Cuba sent hundreds of medical instructors to the country, while preparing to receive many more East Timorese for training in Cuba.

In April 1999 the Indonesian government effectively closed UNTIM in response to mass demonstrations demanding a referendum. Immediately following the announcement of the ballot by the UN, most students and the few East Timorese lecturers returned to their villages to campaign for independence, while the Indonesian lecturers returned to their home islands.

=== The Polytechnic ===
Technical courses were based in a building in Becora, next to the Senior High School of Economics, and a campus in Hera, close to the University's Agriculture College. The Dili Polytechnic provided Electrical and Mechanical Engineering, Civil Construction and Accountancy.

Significant funding came from abroad to upgrade facilities and resources.

=== Destruction (1999) ===
In September 1999 when the Indonesian military and militia rampaged through East Timor destroying vital infrastructure, the education system was a major target for destruction. This was known as the Scorched Earth Operation.

The first buildings to be razed were resistance centers including the CNRT offices and student centers. Then the schools, colleges and the university were destroyed. Ninety-five per cent of school buildings in East Timor were destroyed. The UNTIM and Polytechnic buildings in Dili and in Hera, as well as the Nurses Institute, were looted, smashed and burnt with little surviving the onslaught.

University students fanned across the country before the referendum in 1999 to work for the vote for independence, many being killed in the violence that followed. After the destruction students again went to regional areas to teach classes in burnt out buildings to keep the children learning and the schools open. They also organized classes for tertiary students when no other education facilities were operational.

=== Post-independence ===
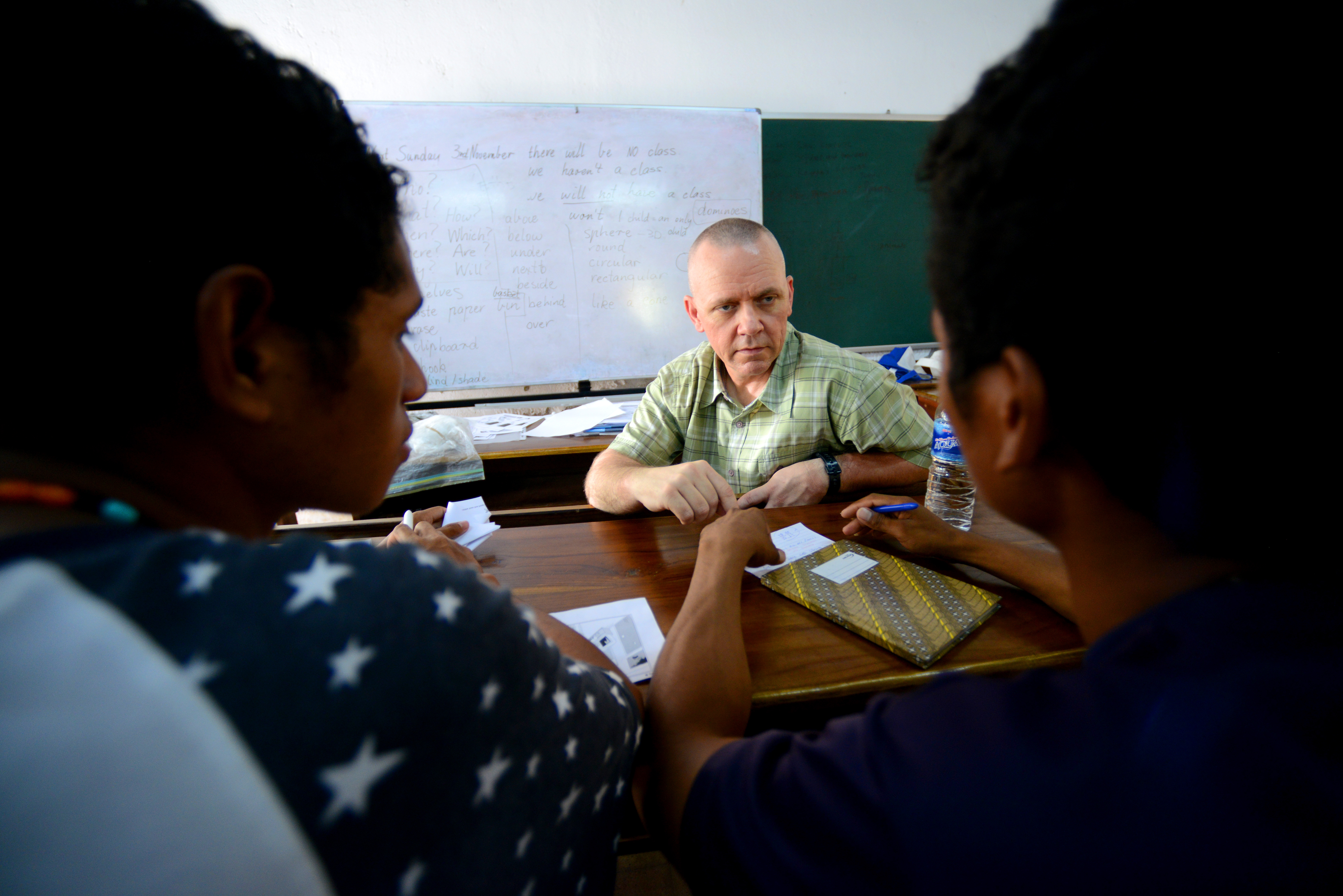
Rod Moore, Captain of the United States Navy, teaching English classes to engineering students at UNTL in 2013

No funds had been budgeted for the university by UNTAET. Many of the former UNTIM and Polytechnic staff and students worked for a year with no pay to establish the university.

Tight planning and active lobbying of donors by Dr Armindo Maia (acting rector and now Minister for Education, Youth and Cultural Affairs) and the then Minister for Education, the Reverend Filomeno Jacob meant that the new university, despite its serious lack of resources, was able to commence teaching classes for 5,000 students and 1,500 bridging course students in November 2000.

In September 2000, the cabinet allocated US$1.3 million to the university from Timor-Leste's education budget.

The new National University of Timor Lorosa'e (UNTL) is an amalgamation of the old UNTIM and the Polytechnic. It has moved to the former Technical High School in central Dili. Buildings have been renovated by a local firm, funded by the United States Agency for International Development (USAID). The 'Câmara Municipal Lisboa' (Lisbon Municipal Council) funded and renovated the Faculty of Education and Economics buildings. The Australian Centre for International Agricultural Research (ACIAR) and the Japanese government are assisting the rebuilding of the agricultural campus and engineering school at Hera.

Many bilateral donors have preferred to fund scholarships for East Timorese in their own countries or to fund short course training offered by the Civil Service Academy for public servants already employed by the Transitional Administration.

The university opened for classes on November 17, 2000 — two months later than originally envisaged due to reconstruction activities and the lack of resources. Most of the buildings were being rebuilt. Few of the classrooms had any furniture. There were virtually no teaching or curriculum resources for the newly appointed teaching staff. There was no accessible library, no administrative infrastructure, no phone network, no IT system, no Internet, no photocopiers, no fax machines, no audio-visual equipment or other basic teaching equipment. When the university opened, each faculty shared a bare classroom with a few old tables and chairs and a single secondhand computer.

On 12 December 2025, UNTL engineering lecturer Joviano António da Costa was elected university rector for the period of 2026 to 2031, replacing João Soares Martins. Da Costa was elected with nine out of 17 votes in the second round of voting against two rivals, with 12 candidates initially registered and three, including da Costa, advancing after the first round.

On 13 January 2026, the National Police of Timor-Leste (PNTL) arrested UNTL rector João Soares Martins, the vice rector for financial administration affairs, the administrator general, and four other senior administrators of the university on charges of forgery, alleged to have occurred in 2024. The arrests were carried out by the PNTL's National Criminal Investigation Service Directorate in execution of a warrant issued by the Judicial Tribunal of First Instance. The PNTL also searched the rector's residence and the offices of the arrested officials to collect evidence. The following day, higher education minister José Honório expressed regret over the arrests and criticized the PNTL's actions, stating that the officials were not treated with respect to their status as professors and that, if suspected of a crime, they should have been given the chance to issue a statement before being arrested. The minister said that despite the arrests, the learning process for UNTL students would continue unaffected. Prime Minister Xanana Gusmão urged the Ministry of Higher Education, Science and Culture to look seriously at the case in question to avoid similar situations in the future.

== Structure ==
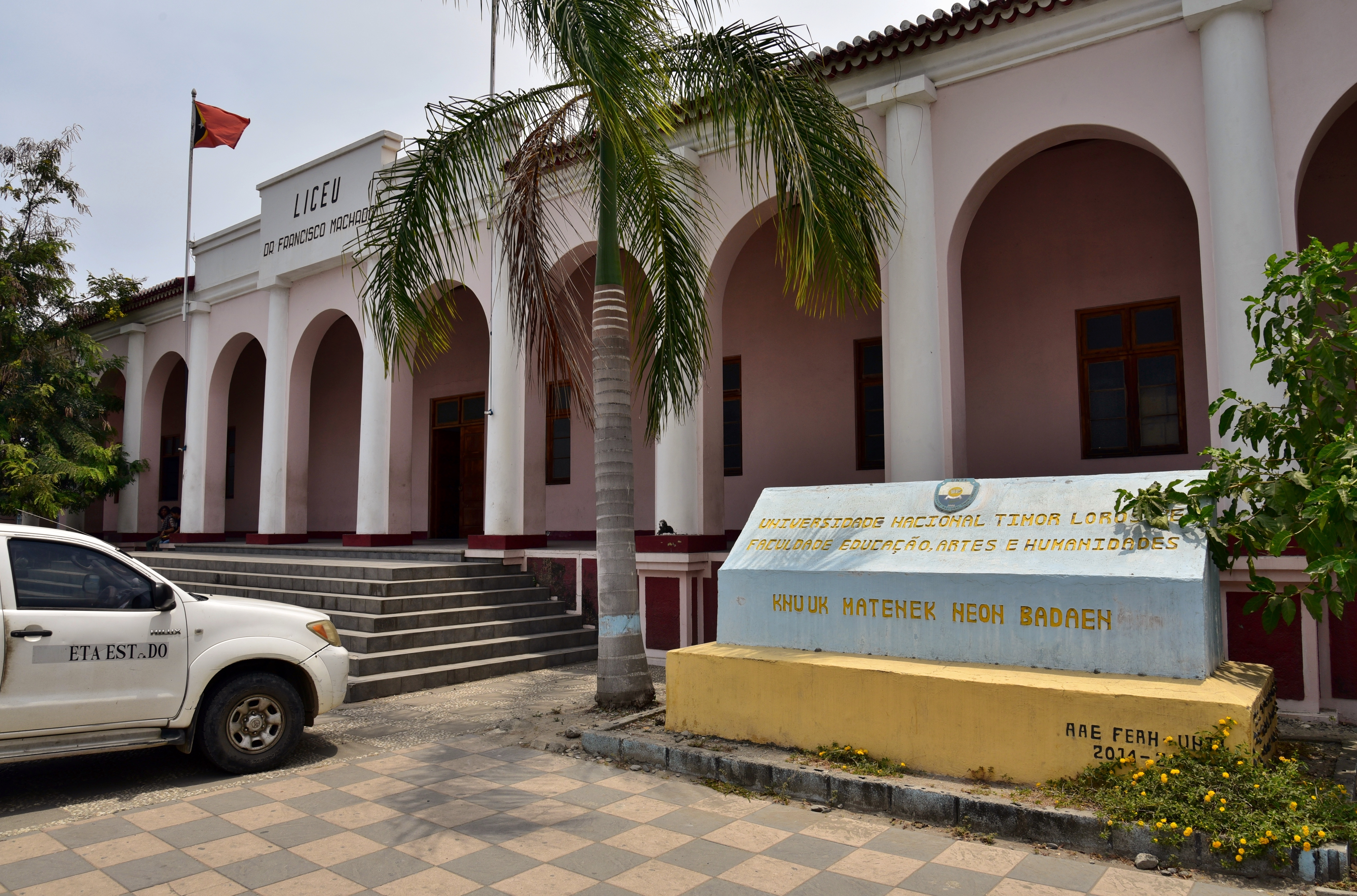
Faculty of Education, Arts, and Humanities, Liceu Dr. Francisco Machado, in 2018

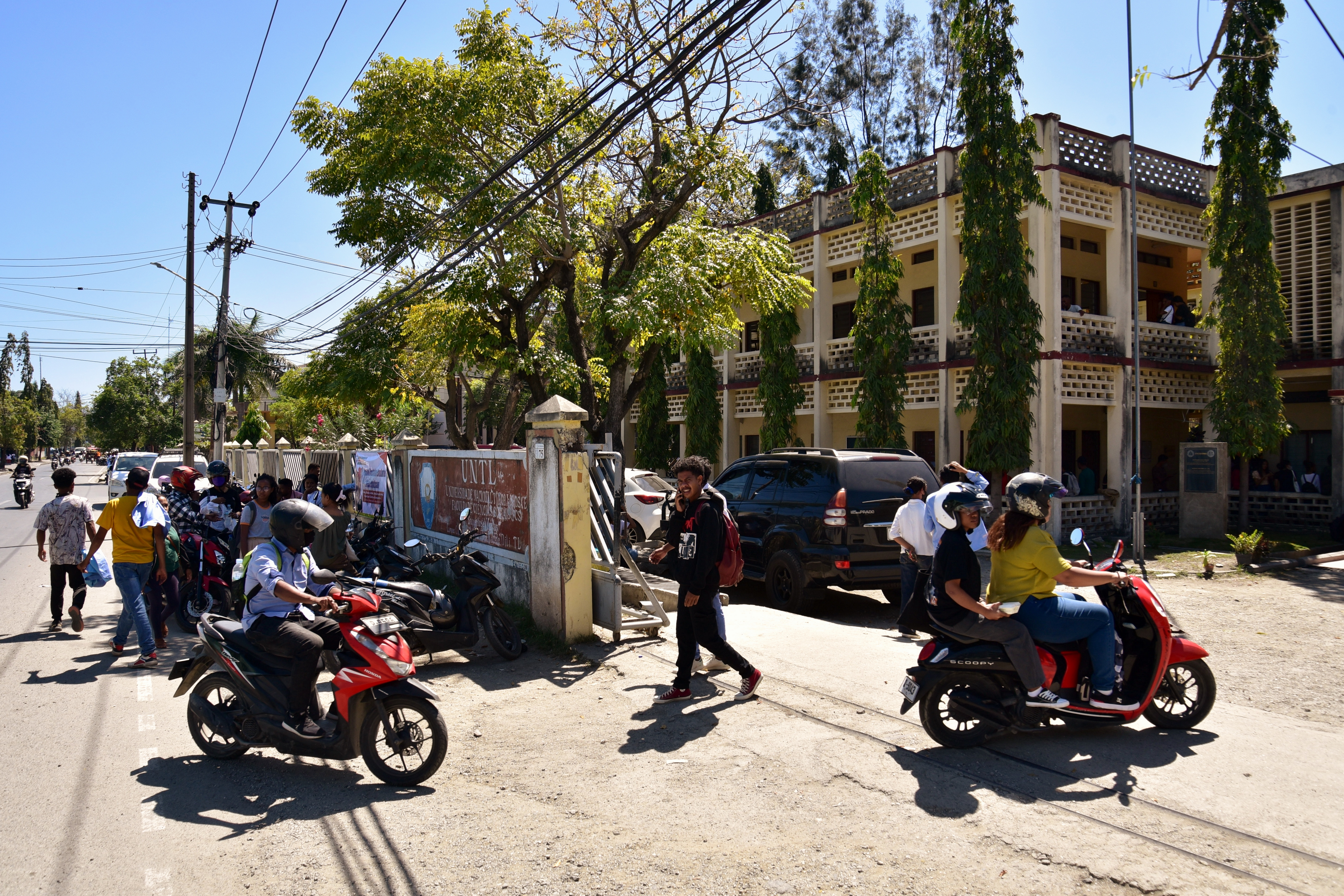
Faculty of Social Sciences, Caicoli Campus, in 2023

In 2016, there were 37 higher education courses, organized in nine faculties:

- Faculty of Agriculture: headquartered at the Central Campus;
- Faculty of Exact Sciences: headquartered at Balide Campus;
- Faculty of Social Sciences: headquartered at Caicoli Campus;
- Law School: headquartered at Central Campus;
- Faculty of Economics and Management: headquartered at Escola Engenheiro Canto Resende Campus;
- Faculty of Education, Arts and Humanities: considered an heir to the Teacher Training School Engenheiro Canto Resende (therefore the oldest organic institution at this university), it is headquartered at the Liceu Dr. Francisco Machado Campus. There are also three bodies linked to this faculty, namely:
  - National Institute of Linguistics (INL): among other initiatives, it promotes the development of Tetum, one of the country's two official languages;
  - Portuguese Language Center (CLP): in addition to teaching the Portuguese language at UNTL, it is the regulator of the East Timorese variant of Portuguese;
  - English Language Center (CLI): dedicated to teaching and disseminating the English language within the UNTL.
- Faculty of Engineering, Science and Technology: headquartered at Hera Campus;
- Faculty of Philosophy: substitute of the Philosophy College, located at the Central Campus;
- Faculty of Medicine and Health Sciences: headquartered at Caicoli Campus.

=== Research centers ===
In addition to the university structure, there are still four research centers:

- National Center for Scientific Research (CNIC);
- Institute for Peace, Conflict and Social Studies (IEPCS);
- Center for Gender Studies (CEG);
- Center for Climate Change and Biodiversity (CMCB).

== Student activities ==
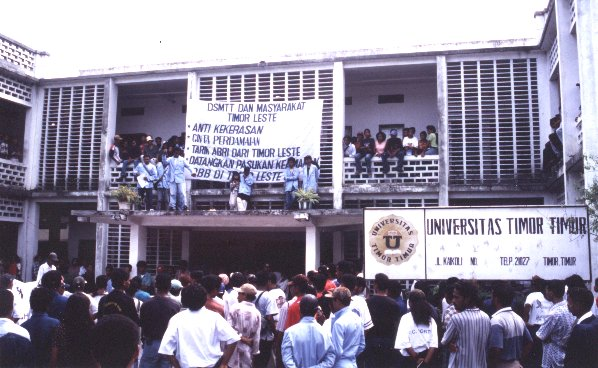
Assembly of the Solidarity Association of University and Student Youth of East Timor, setting out the protest guidelines during the student strike against violence and for the Independence of Timor, on the UnTim campus, in November 1998.

The East Timorese student associations that had been formed on the UNTIM campus and within Indonesia (ETSSC, IMPETTU and RENETIL) became the mainstay of the pro-independence campaign for the ballot and continued to be active afterwards. They have become key organizations of the East Timorese civil society.

East Timorese students and academics played a vital role in the clandestine resistance. Many were subject to torture, arbitrary arrest, disappearance, rape and murder. Some joined the Falintil armed forces in the mountains.

A clandestine student organisation was formed in 1997 (the East Timor Youth Solidarity Organization, OSK-TL) to encourage non-violent resistance against Indonesian occupation.

RENETIL (Resistência Nacional dos Estudantes de Timor Leste) began as an organization of East Timorese students attending universities in Indonesia in 1988. Its work organizing the resistance led to many of its leaders being jailed. While RENETIL was clandestine, IMPETTU was a legal organisation for East Timorese students in Indonesia.

In 1997, Indonesian military opened fire at UNTIM, causing damage to the university building and wounding some students. Many were arrested. Students began to speak up, writing protest letters to the UN and the international community demanding an independent investigation.

In June 1998, 17 days after Soeharto resigned, the East Timor Students Solidarity Council (ETSSC) was formed as an open body representing the views of UNTIM students, academics and high school students. ETSSC focused on empowering ordinary East Timorese in political and community development. The Council organised public meetings, demonstrations and dialogues.

When the UN mission arrived in East Timor in mid-1999, the Students Solidarity Council set up regional offices in all of East Timor's thirteen regions. Over 3,000 students established regional education centres and disseminated information about human rights and conducted voter education, often in areas too remote to be reached by the United Nations. Many ETSSC students were attacked and at times killed by Indonesian military and pro-integration militia.

Since the ballot and the devastation in 1999, members have been involved in community activities including teaching in primary schools, providing capacity building workshops and community study groups, and rebuilding secondary schools. ETSSC's Student Resource Centre (SRC) provided language and computer skills training, Tetum training for NGO workers, social, cultural and environmental research and media monitoring projects for the many tertiary students who had their education interrupted.

ETSSC, IMPETTU and RENETIL continue to work to secure a democratic future for Timor-Leste through education and training, community development, participation in the election process and other nation building programs.

== Institutional agreements ==
UNTL preserves strong cooperation with Brazilian universities, mainly with the University for International Integration of the Afro-Brazilian Lusophony (UNILAB), an institution that absorbs most of the teaching and research fellows from Timor. UNILAB also cooperates on matters of administrative and technical experience.

== Rectors ==
- Armindo Maia – 17 November 2000 — 19 September 2001
- Benjamim de Araújo e Côrte-Real – 19 September 2001 — 1 December 2010
- Aurélio Sérgio Cristóvão Guterres – 1 December 2010 — 13 January 2016
- Francisco Miguel Martins – 13 January 2016 — 18 January 2021
- João Soares Martins – 19 January 2021 — 30 January 2026
- Joviano António da Costa – 30 January 2026 — 2031

== Notable faculty ==
- Brigida Antónia Correia, lecturer in agricultural science and Member of Parliament

== See also ==
- List of universities in Timor-Leste
