= Ministry of Higher Education, Science and Culture =

Ministry in the government of East Timor

- Ministério do Ensino Superior, Ciência e Cultura (Portuguese); Ministériu Ensinu Superiór, Siénsia no Kultura (Tetum)
- Coat of Arms of East Timor

Ministry overview
- Formed: 2018
- Jurisdiction: Government of East Timor
- Headquarters: Av. Gov. Alves Aldeia, Dili; 8°33′16″S 125°34′31″E
- Minister responsible: José Honório da Costa Pereira Jerónimo, Minister of Higher Education, Science and Culture
- Website: Ministry of Higher Education, Science and Culture
- Agency ID: MESCC
- Ministry logo
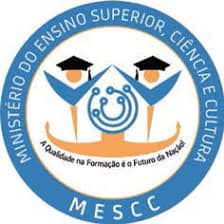

The Ministry of Higher Education, Science and Culture (MESCC; Portuguese: Ministério do Ensino Superior, Ciência e Cultura, Tetum: Ministériu Ensinu Superiór, Siénsia no Kultura) is the government department of East Timor accountable for higher education and related matters.

== Functions ==
The Ministry is responsible for the design, implementation, coordination and evaluation of policy for the following areas:

- higher education and qualification:
- science;
- technology; and
- arts and culture.

=== ANAAA ===
The ministry oversees the National Agency for Academic Assessment and Accreditation (ANAAA; Tetum: Ajénsia Nasional ba Avaliasaun no Akreditasaun Akadémika), East Timor's national accreditation agency for higher education institutions, established in 2010.

== Minister ==
The Minister of Higher Education, Science and Culture was José Honório da Costa Pereira Jerónimo.

== See also ==
- List of higher education ministries
- List of science ministries
- List of culture ministries
- Politics of East Timor
