= Abel Pires da Silva =

East Timorese politician

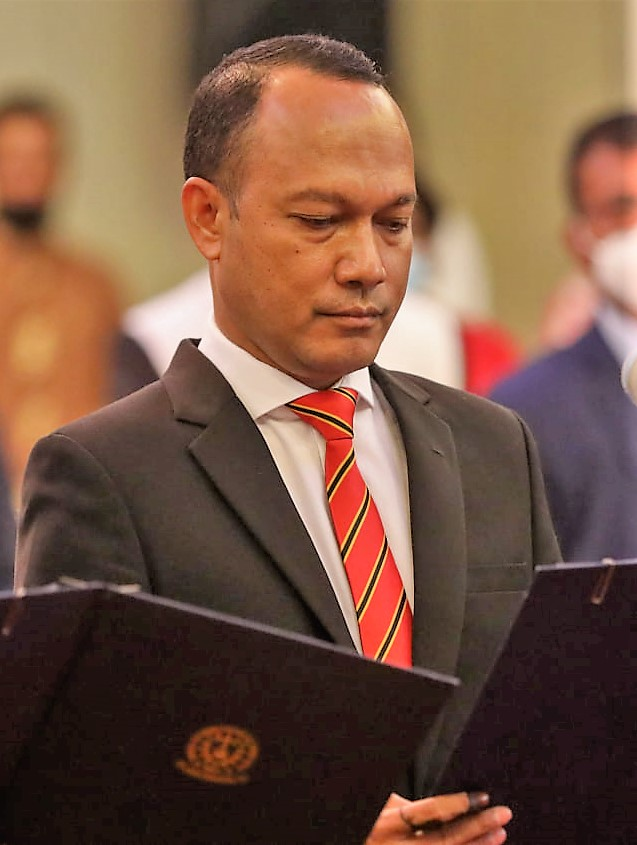
- Silva in 2022

9th Minister of Public Works
- In office 22 March 2022 – 1 July 2023
- President: José Ramos-Horta
- Prime Minister: Taur Matan Ruak
- Preceded by: Salvador Soares dos Reis Pires
- Succeeded by: Samuel Marçal

Personal details
- Born: Seran Toza Lialuli; 24 May 1976 (age 50) Taroman, Cova Lima, East Timor
- Party: People's Liberation Party
- Education: Diponegoro University (BEng); Swinburne University of Technology (MIT); Australian National University (PhD)
- Occupation: Computer scientist and politician

Abel Pires da Silva (né Seran Toza Lialuli; born 24 May 1976) is an East Timorese computer scientist and politician. From March 2022 to July 2023, he was Minister of Public Works in the VIII Constitutional Government of East Timor led by Prime Minister Taur Matan Ruak.

At the age of 41 he was one of the youngest members of the National Parliament. Additionally, he served as the National Parliament's Chair of the Infrastructure Permanent Committee, Chair of the Timor-Leste and Japan Friendship Group, Inaugural Chair of the Young Parliamentarians Group, Secretary of the Timo-Leste Delegation to the Inter-Parliamentary Union, and an active member of the ASEAN Parliamentarians for Human Rights (APHR).

== Early life and education ==
Seran Toza Lialuli was born on the Foho Taroman mountain in southwest East Timor. During this time, the country was under Indonesian annexation, driving many residents to seek refuge in the wild. When Silva joined in the Catholic primary school, which demanded a Christian name, he changed to his current name. He moved to Dili at the age of 14, where he excelled in a computer course and graduated at the top of his class. Silva continued his education in Diponegoro University in Semarang with scholarship from the then Provincial Government of Timor-Timur, where he earned a BA in Engineering.

It is during his study at this university that he became very active in the Timor-Leste's resistance movements. Merely 3 months after arriving in Semarang, he joined the resistance movement as a sworn member of Resistência Nacional dos Estudantes de Timor-Leste (National Resistance of East Timorese Students) – RENETIL adopting a clandestine name, nom de guerre of "Lalehan Novembro" (LANOVE) or "November Sky".

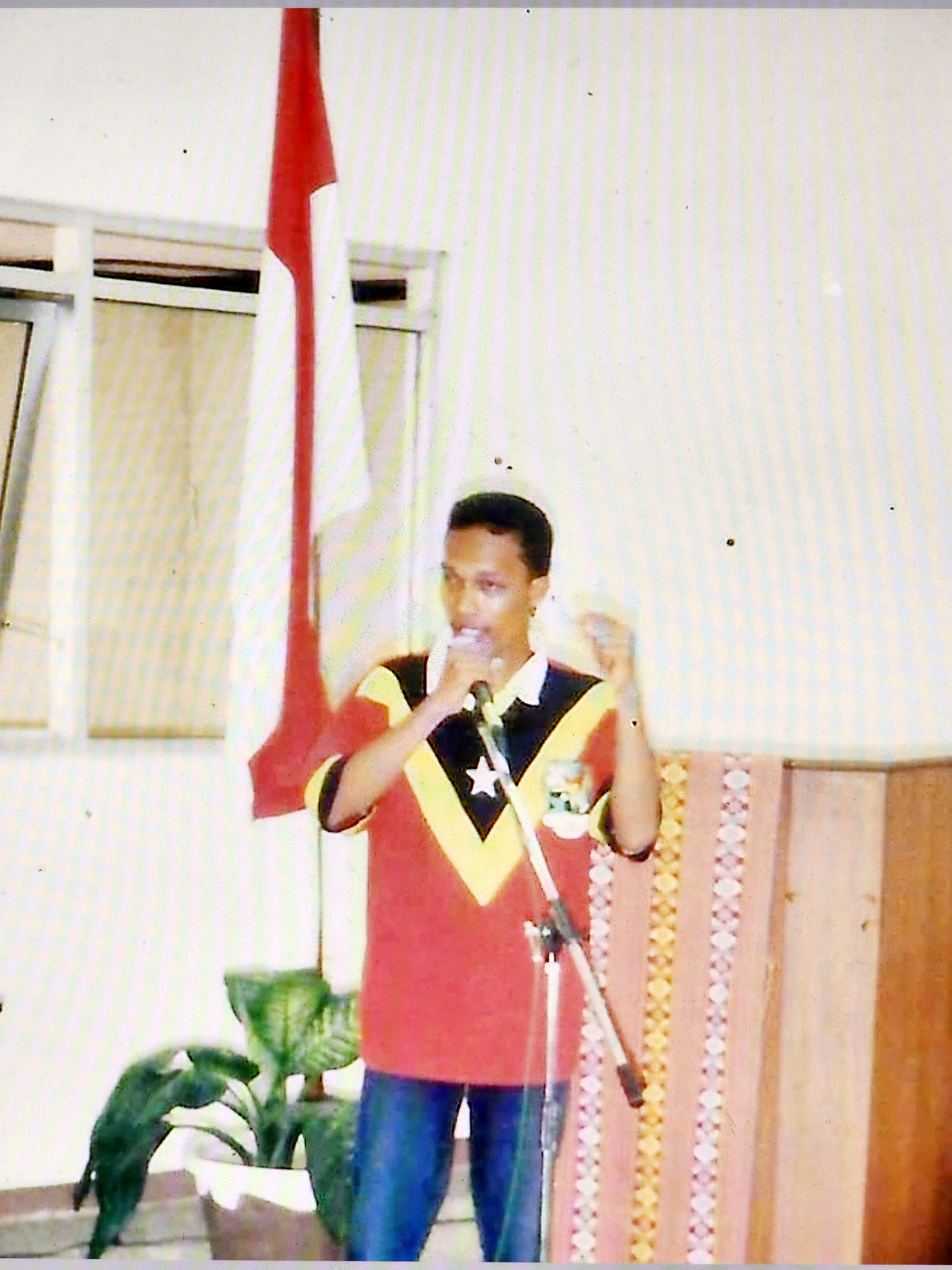
Abel Pires da Silva as an activist in 1997

He received most of his political trainings in this Timor-Leste's formal resistance organisation. In early 1997 at the age of 20 years old, he was entrusted by his fellow sworn members (membro jurados) to take the responsibility as their Vice-Responsável Principal to lead RENETIL's branch in Semarang city until Timor-Leste restored its formal independence in 2002, following the referendum in 1999. This video is one of many public demonstrations participated and/or led by Abel Lanove in Jakarta demanding for Timor-Leste's rights for self-determination.

He received his first Australia Awards scholarship in 2005 and enrolled at Swinburne University of Technology in Melbourne to pursue a master's degree in information technology. Then, in 2009, he received a second scholarship and attended The Australian National University (ANU) in Canberra from July 2010 to July 2014, earning his PhD in information systems with the highest possible thesis examination result of degree award without revisions, according to the ANU's Research Awards Rules.

== Academic publications ==
In collaborations with his academic mentor, Professor Emeritus Walter Fernandez, Abel Pires da Silva has published a number of academic articles in prestigious and leading conferences in the Information Systems discipline such as the European Conference on Informations Systems (ECIS), Americas Conference on Information Systems (AMCIS), the Hawaii International Conference on System Sciences (HICSS) and the Working Group on the Implications of Information and Digital Technologies for Development (IFIP 9.4) conference. Below are several selected academic articles:

1. "Sharing Wisdoms from the East”: Developing a Native Theory of ICT4D Using Grounded Theory Methodology (GTM)-Experience from Timor-Leste, the First IFIP9.4 Virtual Conference on Implications of Information and Digital Technologies for Development, 2021.

2. The Pursuit of Sustainable ICT4D: Lessons from Timor-Leste, the 53rd Hawaii International Conference on System Sciences, Maui – Hawaii, 2020.

3. ICT for Development and Self-serving International Agencies: No Free-lunch Even in a Shattered Tropical Paradise, the Americas Conference on Information Systems (AMCIS), Cancun-Mexico, 2019.

4. Significance of 'Contexts' in ICTD Projects: Alignment and Misalignment of Stakeholders' Interests, the 49th Hawaii International Conference on System Sciences (HICSS), Koloa-Hawaii, 2016.

5. Sustainability of ICTD Projects and Its Influencing Factors: A Comprehensive Literature Review, the 49th Hawaii International Conference on System Sciences (HICSS), Koloa-Hawaii, 2016.

6. Beyond Free Lunch: Building Sustainable ICT4D, the 21st European Conference on Information Systems (ECIS), Utrecht, 2013.

7. More than hope and good intentions: Deploying ict projects at the edge of development, Helsinki-Finland, 2011.

8. ICT Projects in Least Developed Countries: Exploring the Nature and Effects of Stakeholder interactions, Organizations and Society in Information Systems, Pre-International Conference on Information Systems (ICIS) Workshop, Shanghai, 2011.

9. Exploring E-government Projects in East Timor, the 5th International Conference on Qualitative Research in IT & IT in Qualitative Research (QualIT2010), Brisbane, 2010.

10. East Timor Chapter, the Asia-Pacific Digital ReviewEdition: 2009–2010 Edition, Chapter: East Timor, Publisher: Orbicom and the International Development Research Centre, 2009.

== Political career ==
Silva was an activist when he was younger during the Indonesian occupation. As a member of parliament in Asia's newest democracy, he has since discovered that a different method to persuasion is necessary. He understands that to affect change and be able to put up new ideas and policies, he must be part of the system.

From April 2008 to June 2009, Silva served as an information and communication technology advisor for the East Timorese Ministry of Agriculture and Fisheries. He later held the positions of program manager and development advisor for information and communication technology at the offices of deputy prime minister José Luis Guterres and Land O'Lakes International Development, from February 2010 to May 2010. Additionally, from 2007 to 2009, Silva served as president of the Timor-Leste Information & Communication Technology Association (ICT-TL). He later served as the National Directorate of Informatics at the Universidade Nacionál Timór Lorosa'e (UNTL) in 2015 as Director of Information and Communication Technology. Last but not least, he has served as Senior Telecommunications Adviser in Inácio Moreira's office since February 2016 as the second Deputy Minister of Transport and Communications.

Silva ran for the People's Liberation Party (PLP) on the seventh list in the 2017 East Timorese parliamentary election, winning a seat in the country's national parliament. He was elected to lead the Commission for Infrastructure, Transport, and Communications from this position. He was ranked number 40 on the Aliança para Mudança e Progresso (AMP), a list that the PLP, CNRT, and KHUNTO jointly put together, however he was unable to get a seat in the 2018 East Timorese parliamentary election. He was elected to the National Security Council and served as president of the Infrastructure Commission. Silva was sworn in as the next Minister of Public Works on 22 March 2022.

Silva failed to recover position 31 on the PLP list in the 2023 East Timorese parliamentary election since the party only garnered four MPs. His tenure as Minister ended when the IX Constitutional Government took office on 1 July 2023. He was succeeded by Samuel Marçal.

Political offices
Preceded by Salvador Soares dos Reis Pires	9th Minister of Public Works; 22 March 2022 – 1 July 2023	Succeeded by Samuel Marçal
