= Adriano do Nascimento =

East Timorese politician, teacher and university lecturer

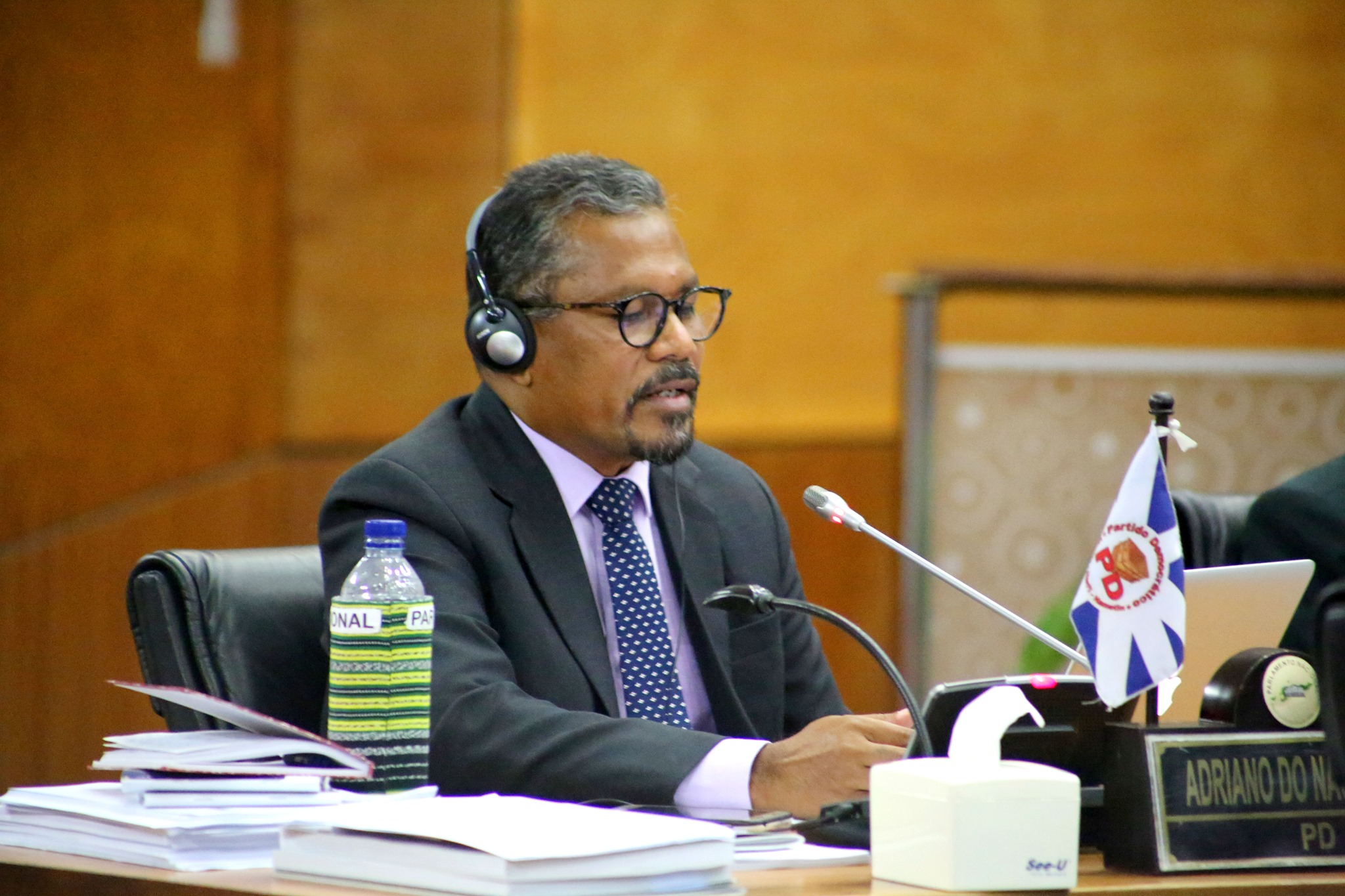
- Nascimento in 2019

Member of the National Parliament
- In office 2018–2023

Minister in the Presidency of the Council of Ministers
- In office 3 October 2017 – 22 June 2018
- Prime Minister: Mari Alkatiri
- Preceded by: Ágio Pereira
- Succeeded by: Ágio Pereira

Member of the National Parliament
- In office 2007–2017

Personal details
- Born: 12 January 1970 (age 56) Holbelis, Cova Lima, Portuguese Timor (now East Timor)
- Party: Democratic Party (PD)
- Education: University of Nusa Cendana; Eastern Mennonite University; University of Notre Dame
- Profession: Teacher, University lecturer

Adriano do Nascimento (born 12 January 1970) is an East Timorese politician, teacher and university lecturer. He is a member of the Democratic Party (PD). Between 2007 and 2017, he was a member of the National Parliament of East Timor, and from October 2017 to June 2018, he was minister in the presidency of the Council of Ministers in the VII Constitutional Government of East Timor. Between June 2018 and June 2023, he was again a member of the National Parliament.

== Early life and career ==
Adriano do Nascimento was born in Holbelis, Cova Lima, in the then Portuguese Timor. He studied Education and English at the University of Nusa Cendana (Indonesian: Universitas Nusa Cendana) in Kupang, West Timor, Indonesia, and later at the Eastern Mennonite University in Virginia and the University of Notre Dame in Indiana, USA. Additionally, he completed training courses in Australia, Thailand and Indonesia. While in Kupang, he was president of the organization IMPETU / IMAPTIM (Tetun: Asosiasaun Estudante Timor-Leste) from 1996 to 1997.

In 1997–98, Nascimento was a teacher at a pre-secondary and secondary school in Suai, Cova Lima.

During the Indonesian occupation of East Timor, Nascimento was active in an underground network, working in the areas of political agitation and international relations. He later joined the National Council of Maubere Resistance (Portuguese: Conselho Nacional da Resistência Maubere (CNRM)), the umbrella organization of the East Timorese resistance. Between 1998 and 2000, he was general coordinator of the East Timor Student Solidarity Council (Indonesian: Dewan Solidaritas Mahasiswa Pemuda dan Pelajar Timor Timur (DSMPTT)) in the then district of Cova Lima, which supported campaigns for the independence of East Timor. He also promoted that goal in the United States, Ireland, Great Britain, Portugal, Belgium and Spain.

After the United Nations Transitional Administration in East Timor (UNTAET) was established in 1999, Nascimento returned to his work as a teacher in the pre-secondary and secondary school in Suai.

In 2001, Nascimento left Suai to work for the Australia and New Zealand Banking Group (ANZ) in Dili. Between 2002 and 2003, he was employed by the East Timorese non-governmental organization La'o Hamutuk, and focused his attention on the oil and gas deposits in the Timor Sea. From then until 2006, he was engaged by the international humanitarian agency Catholic Relief Services (CRS) as a project manager for the Peace Building / Dezenvolvimentu Paz program. He was also a lecturer at the Universidade da Paz (UNPAZ).

== Political career ==
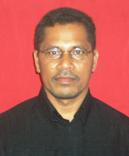
Nascimento in 2007

In 2000–2001, during the UN administration of East Timor, Nascimento was a member of the Cova Lima District Advisory Council. In February 2001, together with Álvaro do Nascimento, he received training in leadership and local administration while visiting Suai's Australian sister city of Port Phillip.

In the elections to East Timor's interim Constituent Assembly in 2001, Nascimento achieved 22.5% of the vote for Suai District Representative, but was defeated by the Fretilin candidate.

On 1 October 2006 at a PD party congress, Nascimento was elected as one of three vice presidents of the party.

In 2007, Nascimento was elected to the National Parliament, as the third candidate on the PD party list. In Parliament, he was the leader of the PD group and a member of the Committee for Agriculture, Fisheries, Forestry, Natural Resources and Environment (Committee D) and the Committee for Infrastructure and Social Facilities (Committee G).

On 30 August 2007, Nascimento, who had been nominated to be appointed Secretary of State for Tourism, did not take part in the swearing-in ceremony. Instead, he kept his seat in Parliament and remained leader of the PD group.

In the 2012 parliamentary election, Nascimento moved back to seventh place in the PD's electoral list, and was re-elected. In 2015, he took over the leadership of the PD from the late Fernando de Araújo, but later relinquished it to Mariano Sabino Lopes. From 2012 to 2016, Nascimento was Vice President of Parliament and Member of the Committee on Constitutional Affairs, Justice, Public Administration, Local Justice and Anti-Corruption (Committee A). On 5 May 2016, however, he was voted out of office as Vice President of Parliament upon the termination of the coalition between the CNRT and the PD.

In 2017, Nascimento was re-elected to the National Parliament, this time at number 5 in the PD list. However, on 15 September 2017 he had to give up his seat in accordance with the Constitution when he was sworn in as minister for the Council of Ministers in the VII Constitutional Government. As the Fretilin / PD minority government could not prevail in Parliament, President Francisco Guterres dissolved the Parliament. In the ensuing election on 12 May 2018, Nascimento was again number 5 on the PD list, and was again elected to Parliament, in which the PD initially became part of the opposition. Nascimento's tenure as a minister ended when the VIII Constitutional Government took office on 22 June 2018.

During the 2018–2023 parliamentary term, Nascimento was deputy group leader of the PD and a member of the Parliamentary Committees for Constitutional Affairs and Justice (Committee A) and Infrastructure (Committee E).
