= Mariano Sabino Lopes =

East Timorese politician

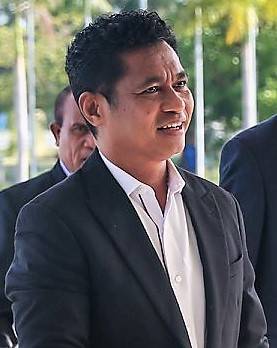
- Sabino in 2020

Deputy Prime Minister of East Timor
- Incumbent
- Assumed office 1 July 2023 Serving with Francisco Kalbuadi Lay
- Prime Minister: Xanana Gusmão
- Preceded by: Armanda Berta dos Santos; José Reis

Coordinating Minister of Rural Development Affairs
- Incumbent
- Assumed office 1 July 2023
- Prime Minister: Xanana Gusmão
- Preceded by: Office established

Member of the National Parliament
- In office 2018–2023

Minister of State and Minister for Mineral Resources
- In office 3 October 2017 – 22 June 2018
- Prime Minister: Mari Alkatiri
- Preceded by: Alfredo Pires
- Succeeded by: Ágio Pereira; (as Minister of State)

Minister of Agriculture and Fisheries
- In office 8 August 2007 – 16 February 2015
- Prime Minister: Xanana Gusmão
- Preceded by: Francisco Benevides
- Succeeded by: Estanislau da Silva

Member of the National Parliament
- In office 2001–2007

Personal details
- Born: 12 April 1971 (age 55): Luro, Lautém, Portuguese Timor; (now Timor-Leste)
- Party: Democratic Party (PD)
- Education: University of Brawijaya

Mariano Sabino Lopes (born 12 April 1971), also known by his nom de guerre Assanami, is an East Timorese politician and a member of the Democratic Party (PD).

He is the more junior of Timor-Leste's two incumbent Deputy Prime Ministers, (Note: The Constitution of Timor-Leste provides, in sections 104 and 105, for the appointment of officials referred to in its English language version as "Deputy Ministers". In other English language publications, those officials are commonly referred to as "Vice Ministers", even though the word "Vice", in context, arguably has a different meaning in English from the word "Deputy". In this article, the constitutional expression "Deputy" is used.) and also the incumbent Coordinating Minister of Rural Development Affairs, serving since July 2023 in the IX Constitutional Government of Timor-Leste led by Prime Minister Xanana Gusmão.

Between 2001 and 2007, he was a member of the National Parliament of Timor-Leste. Between August 2007 and February 2015, he was Minister of Agriculture and Fisheries, and from October 2017 to June 2018 he was Minister of State and Minister for Mineral Resources. From June 2018 to May 2023, he was once again a member of the National Parliament.

== Early life and career ==
Sabino attended primary school in Pairara in the then district of Lautém. In 1991, he began studying at the University of Brawijaya in Malang, East Java, Indonesia. There, he joined the National Resistance of East Timorese Students (Portuguese: Resistência Nacional dos Estudantes de Timor-Leste (RENETIL)). Amongst other things, he formulated plans to infiltrate the Ikatan Mahasiswa dan Pelajar Timor Timur (IMPETTU), the Indonesian-East Timorese student association. He was also involved in the 1995 embassy occupations in Jakarta and demonstrations in 1998.

In April 1999, a few months before the independence referendum, Sabino organised for 850 students from Indonesian universities to return to East Timor to campaign for independence. At that time, he was Deputy Secretary General of RENETIL and head of Ikatan Mahasiswa dan Pelajar Timor Timur (IMPETTU), the East Timorese student association.

== Political career ==
In 2001, Sabino was elected as a PD candidate to the Constituent Assembly of East Timor, from which the National Parliament emerged in 2002. On 31 August 2007, he had to give up his seat in accordance with the Constitution, when he was sworn in as Minister of Agriculture, Forestry and Fisheries in the IV Constitutional Government headed by Prime Minister Xanana Gusmão.

In August 2008, an investigation of corruption allegations against Sabino and another Minister, Lúcia Lobato, was initiated by Amândio de Sá Benevides, Deputy Provedor of the Office of the Provedor for Human Rights and Justice (Portuguese: Provedoria dos Direitos Humanos e Justiça (PDHJ)). However, Sabino remained in his Ministerial office throughout the IV and V Constitutional Governments, each headed by Prime Minister Gusmão, until 16 February 2015, when the latter government was replaced by the VI Constitutional Government led by Prime Minister Rui Maria de Araújo.

In October 2015, the Timor-Leste Chamber of Auditors accused Sabino of "possible financial breaches", which were said to have resulted in possible losses of more than USD 11 million between 2011 and 2014. In some cases, according to an audit to the Ministry of Agriculture and Fisheries, contracts for the supply of goods and services were made with companies close to Sabino, without complying with the required procedures.

In 2017, Sabino was re-elected to the National Parliament, as the list leader in the PD list. However, on 3 October 2017 he was sworn in as Minister for the Council of Ministers in the VII Constitutional Government led by Prime Minister Mari Alkatiri, and therefore again had to give up his seat in accordance with the Constitution. As that Fretilin / PD minority administration could not prevail in the National Parliament, President Francisco Guterres dissolved the Parliament and called a fresh parliamentary election. In the election, held on 12 May 2018, Sabino was again number 1 on the PD list, and was again elected to Parliament, in which the PD initially became part of the opposition. Sabino's tenure as a Minister ended when the VIII Constitutional Government took office on 22 June 2018.

As of 2019, Sabino was a member of the Parliamentary Committee for Economy and Development (Committee D).

On 1 July 2023, upon the commencement of Prime Minister Gusmão's third term in that office, as leader of the IX Constitutional Government, Sabino was appointed as the less senior of two Deputy Prime Ministers, alongside Francisco Kalbuadi Lay.

== Personal life ==
Mariano's father, Mateus Sabino, was Liurai of Luro, Lautém, and his mother was Julieta Ribeiro.

His nom de guerre is the Makasae word for "rooster", consisting of Makasae asa, which means "bird" or "chicken", and nami, which means "male".
