= Júlio Sarmento da Costa =

East Timorese politician (1959–2024)

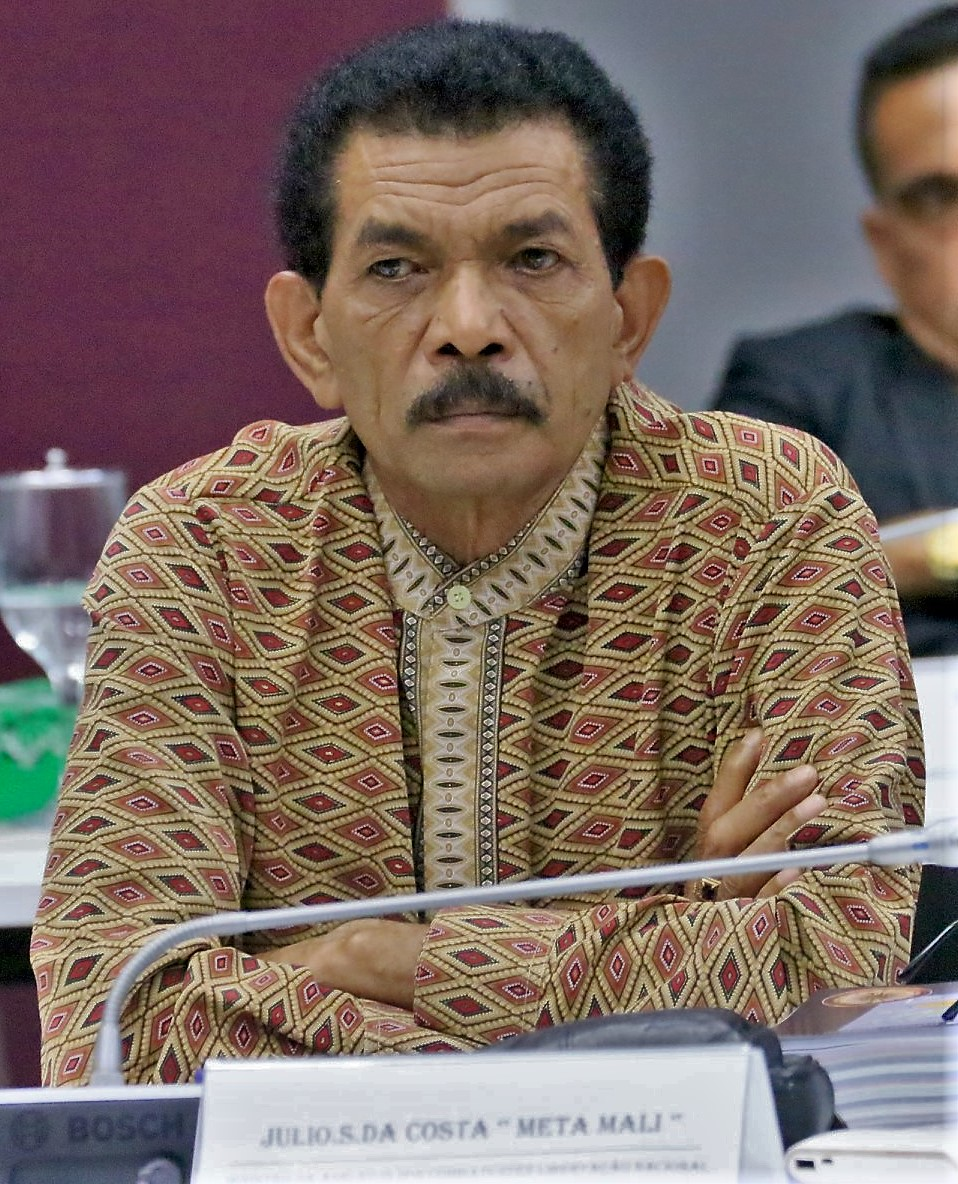
- Costa in 2020

Minister for the Affairs of National Liberation Combatants
- In office 29 May 2020 – 1 July 2023
- Prime Minister: Taur Matan Ruak
- Preceded by: Office re-established
- Succeeded by: Gil da Costa Monteiro "Oan Soru"

Member of the National Parliament
- In office 2017–2018

Secretary of State for the Combatants for National Liberation Affairs
- In office 8 August 2012 – 16 February 2015
- Prime Minister: Xanana Gusmão
- Preceded by: Mário Nicolau dos Reis
- Succeeded by: Office abolished

Personal details
- Born: 20 July 1959 Horai-Quic, Ainaro, Portuguese Timor (now Timor-Leste)
- Died: 24 May 2024 (aged 64) Dili, Timor-Leste
- Party: Democratic Party

Júlio Sarmento da Costa (20 July 1959 – 24 May 2024), also known by his nom de guerre Meta Mali, was an East Timorese politician and a member of the Democratic Party (PD). From May 2020 to July 2023, he was Minister for the Affairs of National Liberation Combatants, serving in the VIII Constitutional Government of Timor-Leste led by Prime Minister Taur Matan Ruak.

Previously, between August 2012 and February 2015, he was Secretary of State for the Combatants for National Liberation Affairs, and in 2017–2018 he was a Member of the National Parliament.

== Political career ==
=== 2007–2018: Candidate, Secretary of State and parliamentarian ===
In the 2007 East Timorese parliamentary election, Costa was nominated in the unwinnable 22nd place on the PD list, and was not elected.

In the 2012 parliamentary election, Costa was in 13th place on the list and narrowly missed out on a Parliamentary seat, despite the waivers of some of those who had been higher in the list. In any case, he would have had to forego any such seat, as on 8 August 2012 he was sworn in as Secretary of State for the Combatants for National Liberation Affairs in the V Constitutional Government, headed by Xanana Gusmão. On 16 February 2015, his tenure in that position came to an end due to a government reshuffle.

In the 2017 parliamentary election, Costa was placed in 8th position on the PD list. Although the PD won only seven seats, one of its candidates, António da Conceição renounced his seat, and Costa succeeded him. On 6 September 2017, the second day of the ensuing Parliamentary session, Costa was elected a First Deputy Speaker of the Parliament. During that session, he was also a member of the Committee for Foreign Affairs, Defence and National Security (Committee B). In the 2018 parliamentary election, Costa was in list position 7, and again missed direct entry into Parliament, as the PD won only 5 seats.

=== 2020–2023: Minister ===
On 29 May 2020, as part of a restructuring of the VIII Constitutional Government, Costa was sworn in as Minister for the Affairs of National Liberation Combatants in that government.

Soon after taking that office, Costa announced that his ministry would be distributing a survey in communities across the country, to collect data on those who had died during East Timor's war of liberation. The government had decided to collect that data to enable the names of the deceased to be included in monuments that would be built throughout the nation.

In July 2021, Costa publicly lamented the inadequate state of Timor-Leste's public hospitals [translation]:

"Many seriously ill people including veterans have to be referred to overseas hospitals to have their health checked because in Timor Leste there is no international standard hospital including Guido Valadares National Hospital (HNGV)".

He went on to observe that the government through the Ministry of Health was therefore forced to spend a lot of money to pay for aeroplanes, hospital fees and accommodation costs for the safety of its people.

In September 2022, while giving a speech at the inauguration of a monument in the village of Leolima, Hato-Udo, Ainaro municipality, Costa commented as follows about young persons who participate in East Timorese ritual arts groups [translation]:

"I believe that all young people can follow the various martial arts but at the same time you should also take part in unifying activity to create a memory for us in the future."

In 2023, Costa was unsuccessful in proposing to the Council of Ministers that US$500,000.00 be allocated for spending on schooling and healthcare for children of veterans. However, during a speech delivered in Baucau municipality in February 2023, he pledged to continue to press the issue.

Later that month, Costa called on all veterans, youth, and students to participate in Veterans Day on 3 March 2023, to honour and respect veterans who had put their lives at risk fighting for East Timorese independence. He also asserted that [translation], "We need to inculcate patriotism and nationalism in our children in order to promote peace and stability in the country."

Maia's tenure as Minister ended when the IX Constitutional Government took office on 1 July 2023. He was succeeded by Gil da Costa Monteiro "Oan Soru".

== Death ==
Costa died on 24 May 2024, at the age of 64.

== Honours ==
- Nicolau Lobato Order, Timor-Leste (First Grade, for more than eight years' participation in the independence movement)
