= Gastão de Sousa =

East Timorese politician

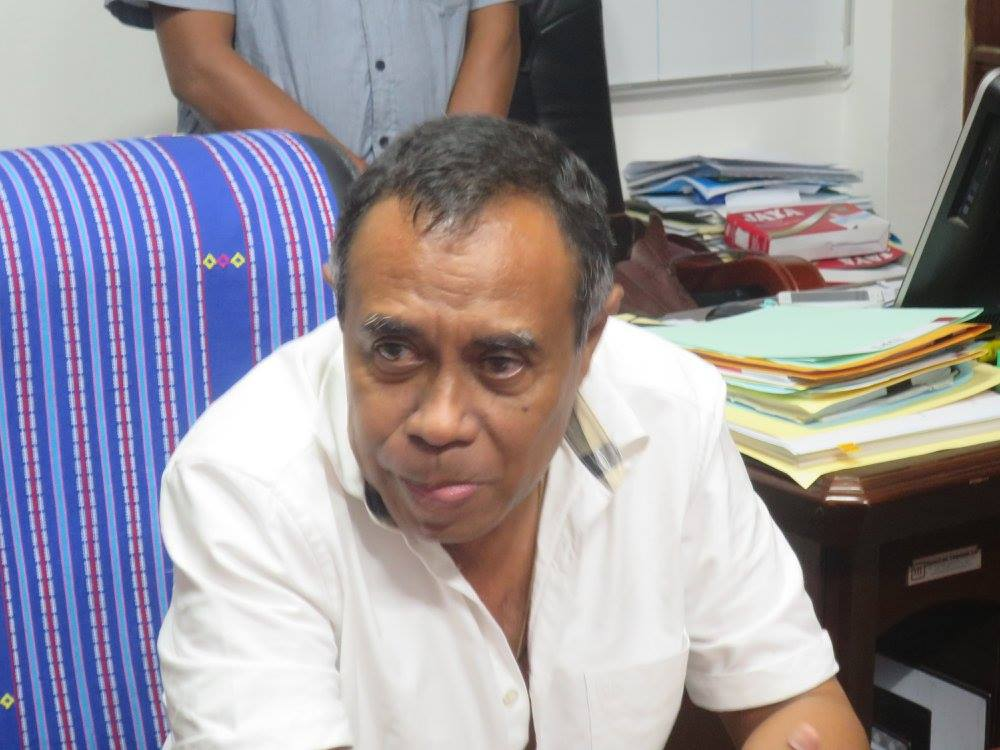
- Sousa in 2017

Minister of Planning and Strategic Investment
- Incumbent
- Assumed office 1 July 2023
- Preceded by: José Maria dos Reis; (as Minister of Planning and Territory)

Minister of Public Works, Transport and Communications
- In office 16 February 2015 – 15 September 2017
- Prime Minister: Rui Maria de Araújo
- Preceded by: Himself; (as Minister of Public Works)
- Succeeded by: Office vacant

Minister of Public Works
- In office 8 August 2012 – 16 February 2015
- Prime Minister: Xanana Gusmão
- Preceded by: Pedro Lay; (as Minister of Infrastructure)
- Succeeded by: Himself; (as Minister of Public Works, Transport and Communications)

Personal details
- Born: 25 March 1960 (age 66)
- Party: Democratic Party (PD)

Gastão Francisco de Sousa (born 25 March 1960) is an East Timorese engineer and politician, and a member of the Democratic Party (Portuguese: Partido Democrático, PD).

He is the incumbent Minister of Planning and Strategic Investment, serving since July 2023 in the IX Constitutional Government of East Timor led by Prime Minister Xanana Gusmão.
