= Pedro dos Reis =

East Timorese politician

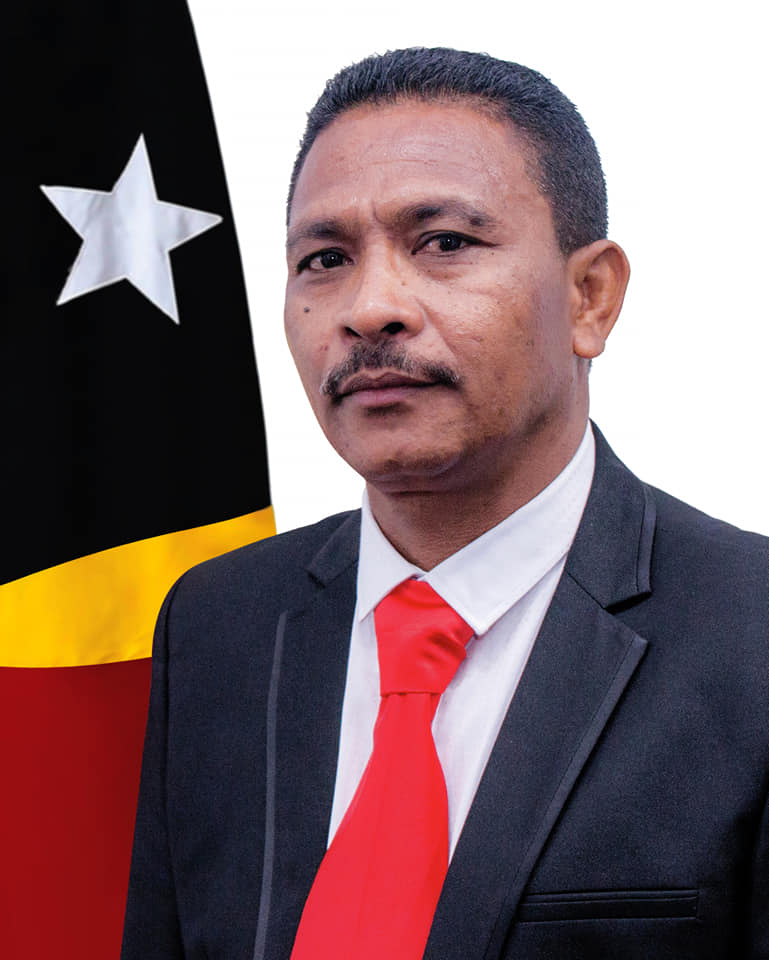
- Reis in 2020

Minister of Agriculture and Fisheries
- In office 24 June 2020 – 1 July 2023
- Prime Minister: Taur Matan Ruak
- Preceded by: Joaquim Gusmão Martins

Personal details
- Party: KHUNTO

Pedro dos Reis is an East Timorese politician. From June 2020 to July 2023, he was Minister of Agriculture and Fisheries, serving in the VIII Constitutional Government of East Timor led by Taur Matan Ruak.

Reis is a member of the Kmanek Haburas Unidade Nasional Timor Oan (KHUNTO) political party; in March 2020, he was elected as its third Vice President.

Reis's tenure as Minister ended when the IX Constitutional Government took office on 1 July 2023. He was succeeded by Marcos da Cruz.
