= Ministry of Planning and Territory (Timor-Leste) =

Ministry in the government of Timor-Leste

- Portuguese: Ministério do Plano e Ordenamento; Tetum: Ministériu Planu no Ordenamentu
- Coat of Arms of Timor-Leste

Ministry overview
- Formed: 2002
- Jurisdiction: Government of Timor-Leste
- Headquarters: Avenida de Hudi-Laran, Dili; 8°33′40″S 125°32′12.5″E
- Minister responsible: José Maria dos Reis, Minister of Planning and Territory
- Agency ID: MPO

The Ministry of Planning and Territory (MPO; Portuguese: Ministério do Plano e Ordenamento, Tetum: Ministériu Planu no Ordenamentu) is the government department of Timor-Leste accountable for the economic and social development of the country.

== Functions ==
The Ministry is responsible for the design, coordination and evaluation of policy for the promotion of economic and social development of Timor-Leste, through strategic and integrated planning and rationalization of available financial resources. The Ministry also has specific responsibilities on the implementation of the country's Strategic Development Plan, especially with regard to infrastructure and Urban Planning, Petroleum and Minerals, Planning and Territory.

== Minister ==
The incumbent Minister of Planning and Territory is José Maria dos Reis, Deputy Prime Minister of Timor-Leste.

== See also ==
- Politics of Timor-Leste
