= Ministry of Public Works (Timor-Leste) =

Ministry in the government of Timor-Leste

- Ministério das Obras Públicas (Portuguese); Ministériu Obras Públikas (Tetum)
- Coat of Arms of Timor-Leste

Ministry overview
- Formed: 1975 / 2001
- Jurisdiction: Government of Timor-Leste
- Headquarters: Avenida Presidente Nicolau Lobato, Motael, Dili; 8°33′13″S 125°33′59″E
- Minister responsible: Samuel Marçal, Minister of Public Works
- Website: Ministry of Public Works
- Agency ID: MOP
- Ministry logo
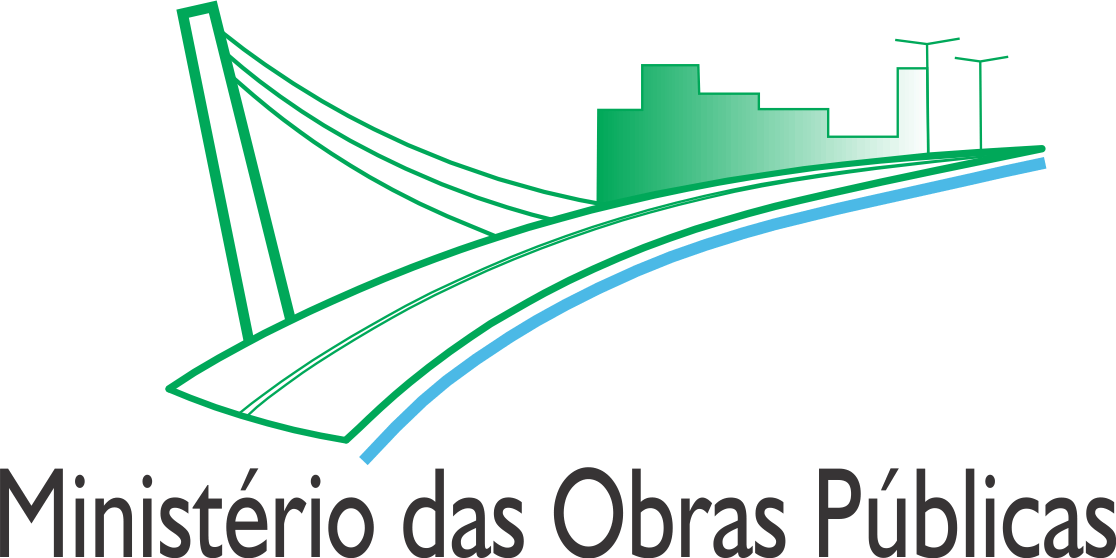

The Ministry of Public Works (MOP; Portuguese: Ministério das Obras Públicas, Tetum: Ministériu Obras Públikas) is the government department of Timor-Leste accountable for public works and related matters.

== Functions ==
The Ministry is responsible for the design, implementation, coordination and evaluation of policy for the following areas:

- public works;
- housing;
- supply, distribution and management of water, sanitation and electricity; and
- execution of urban planning and housing.

== Minister ==
The incumbent Minister of Public Works is Samuel Marçal.

== See also ==
- List of housing authorities
- List of public works ministries
- Politics of Timor-Leste
