= VIII Constitutional Government of Timor-Leste =

East Timorese cabinet led by Taur Matan Ruak

VIII Constitutional Government
- VIII Constitutional Government of Timor-Leste

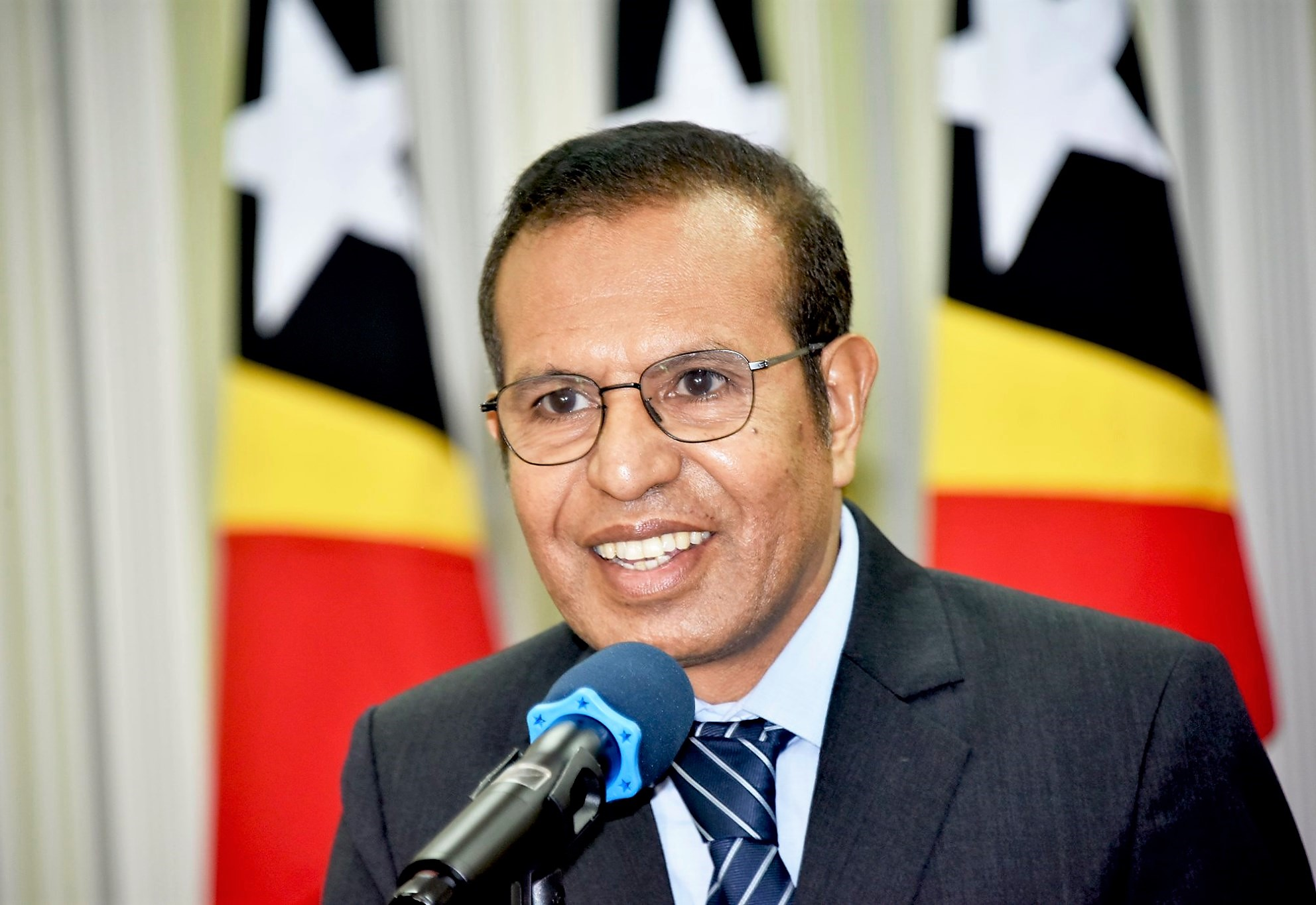
- Prime Minister Taur Matan Ruak
- Date formed: 22 June 2018
- Date dissolved: 1 July 2023

People and organisations
- Presidents: Francisco Guterres; (22 June 2018 – 20 May 2022); José Ramos-Horta; (20 May 2022 – 1 July 2023)
- Prime Minister: Taur Matan Ruak
- No. of ministers: 22 June 2018–12 May 2020: 1 Prime Minister; 11 other Ministers; 7 Deputy Ministers; 10 Secretaries of State; 24 June 2020–1 July 2023: 1 Prime Minister; 2 Deputy Prime Ministers; 17 other Ministers; 12 Deputy Ministers; 11 Secretaries of State
- Member parties: 22 June 2018–25 May 2020: Alliance for Change and Progress; (CNRT–PLP–KHUNTO); 24 June 2020–1 July 2023: Fretilin–PLP–KHUNTO–PD
- Status in legislature: Majority

History
- Election: 2018
- Predecessor: VII Constitutional Government
- Successor: IX Constitutional Government

The VIII Constitutional Government (Portuguese: VIII Governo Constitucional, Tetum: VIII Governu Konstitusionál) was the eighth Constitutional Government (administration or cabinet) under the Constitution of Timor-Leste. Formed on 22 June 2018, and restructured in mid-2020, it was led by the country's seventh Prime Minister, Taur Matan Ruak, and was replaced by the IX Constitutional Government on 1 July 2023.

== Initial (AMP) composition (22 June 2018–24 June 2020) ==
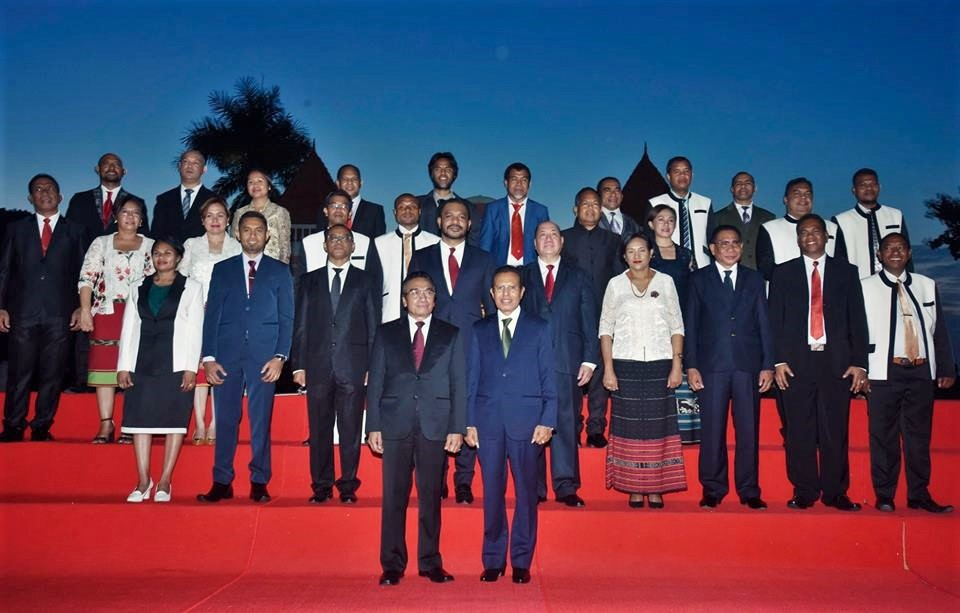
The Government at its swearing in

Initially, the VIII Constitutional Government was drawn from and supported by a coalition known as the Alliance for Change and Progress (AMP), which was made up of the National Congress for Timorese Reconstruction (CNRT), the People's Liberation Party (PLP) and Kmanek Haburas Unidade Nasional Timor Oan (KHUNTO).

The Ministers, Deputy Ministers (Note: The Constitution of Timor-Leste provides, in sections 104 and 105, for the appointment of officials referred to in its English language version as "Deputy Ministers". In other English language publications, those officials are commonly referred to as "Vice Ministers", even though the word "Vice", in context, arguably has a different meaning in English from the word "Deputy". In this article, the constitutional expression "Deputy" is used.) and Secretaries of State appointed to form the government as from 22 June 2018 until the government was restructured in mid-2020 were:

=== Ministers ===
Party	Minister	Portrait	Portfolio
PLP	Taur Matan Ruak		Prime Minister; Leader of the People's Liberation Party
CNRT	Hermenegildo Ágio Pereira		Minister of State of the Presidency of the Council of Ministers (22 June 2018 – 12 May 2020)
PLP	Fidelis Manuel Leite Magalhães		Minister for Legislative Reform and Parliamentary Affairs
CNRT	Dionísio da Costa Babo Soares		Minister of Foreign Affairs and Cooperation (22 June 2018 – 25 May 2020)
Independent	Manuel Cárceres da Costa		Minister of Justice
CNRT	Dulce de Jesus Soares		Minister of Education, Youth and Sports (22 June 2018 – 25 May 2020)
PLP	Longuinhos dos Santos		Minister of Higher Education, Science and Culture
KHUNTO	Armanda Berta dos Santos		Minister of Social Solidarity and Inclusion
PLP	Salvador Soares dos Reis Pires		Minister of Public Works
KHUNTO	José Agustinho da Silva		Minister of Transport and Communications
KHUNTO	Joaquim José Gusmão dos Reis Martins		Minister of Agriculture and Fisheries
Independent	Filomeno da Paixão de Jesus		Minister of Defense

=== Deputy Ministers ===
Party	Deputy Minister	Portrait	Portfolio
CNRT	Sara Lobo Brites		Deputy Minister of Finance
CNRT	Abílio José Caetano		Deputy Minister of State Administration (22 June 2018 – 25 May 2020)
CNRT	Élia dos Reis Amaral		Deputy Minister of Health (22 June 2018 – 3 April 2020)
PLP	Bonifácio dos Reis		Deputy Minister of Health
KHUNTO	João Zacarias Freitas Soares		Deputy Minister of Education, Youth and Sports
PLP	Signi Verdial		Deputy Minister for Social Solidarity
KHUNTO	Nicolau Lino Freitas Belo		Deputy Minister of Public Works

=== Secretaries of State ===
Party	Secretary of State	Portrait	Portfolio
KHUNTO	Julião da Silva		Secretary of State of Vocational Training and Employment
CNRT	Arsénio Pereira da Silva		Secretary of State for Cooperatives (22 June 2018 – 25 May 2020)
PLP	Demetrio do Amaral de Carvalho		Secretary of State for the Environment
PLP	Merício Juvenal dos Reis Akara		Secretary of State for Social Communications
KHUNTO	Mário Ximenes		Secretary of State for Land and Property
CNRT	Nélio Isaac Sarmento		Secretary of State for Youth and Sport (22 June 2018 – 25 May 2020)
PLP	Teófilo Caldas		Secretary of State for Arts and Culture
Independent	Gil da Costa Monteiro Oan Soru		Secretary of State for the Affairs of Combatants of National Liberation
Independent	Alexandrino de Araújo		Secretary of State for Civil Protection
PLP	Maria José da Fonseca Monteiro de Jesus		Secretary of State for Equality and Inclusion

== Restructured composition (24 June 2020–1 July 2023) ==
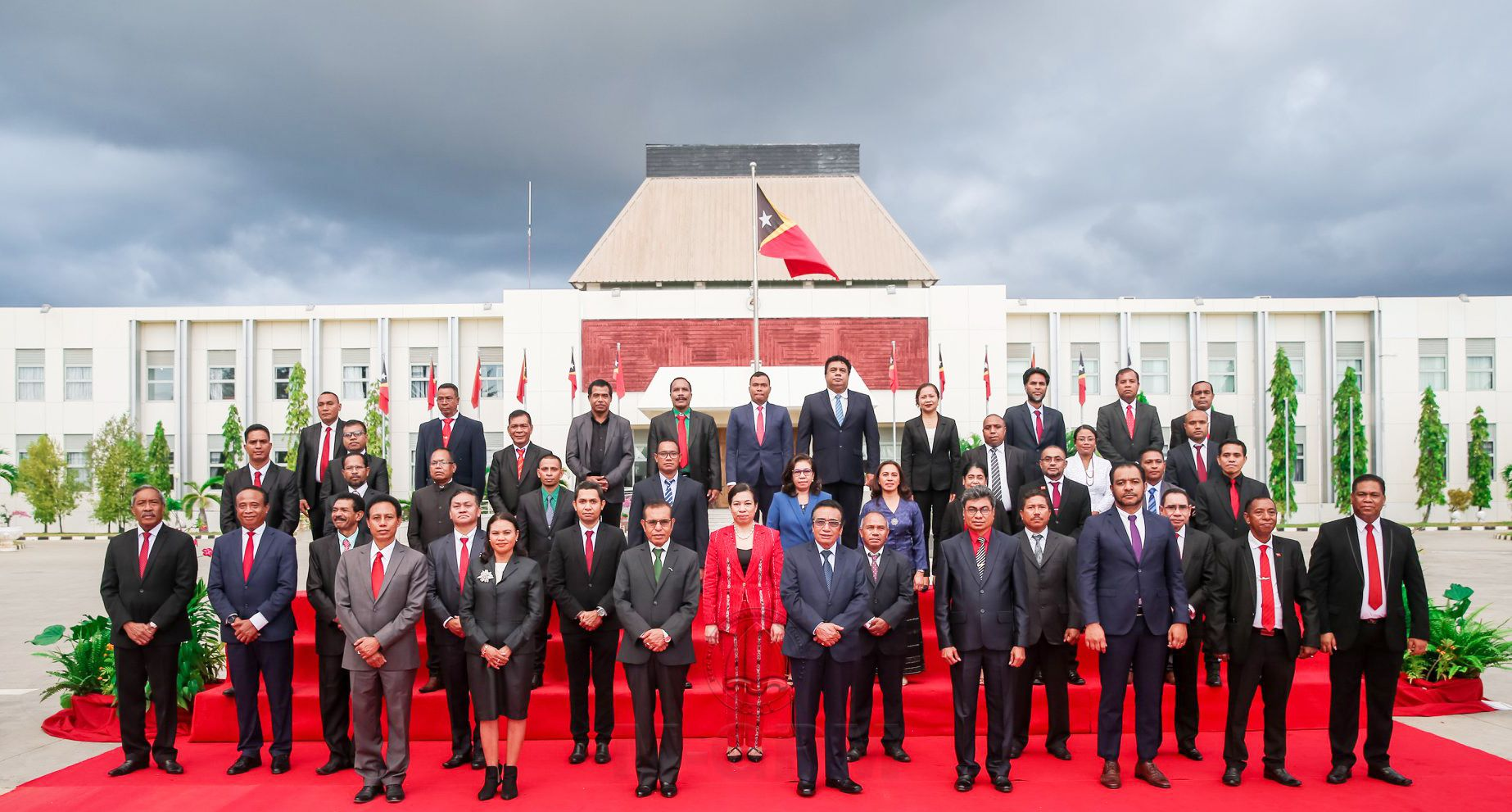
The restructured government, 24 June 2020

Following a breakdown of the AMP coalition during the first few months of 2020, the government was restructured on 12 May 2020, new officials were appointed on 29 May and 24 June 2020.

At the swearing-in ceremony held on 29 May 2020, the Prime Minister said that the swearing-in of the government's new members aimed to "ensure the restoration of governing normality". He added that the Government intended:

"... with this reshaping, to pave the way for political stability that allows the contribution and involvement of all Timorese, regardless of the ideology they have, the party of which they are members or the aspirations they have towards the country."

He also said that:

"...the construction of the future of our nation does not dispense with the contribution of any Timorese and it is with awareness of this fact that the Eight Constitutional Government opens itself to the participation of new political forces in an effort of concertation and dialogue that is fundamental to ensure that Timor-Leste and the Timorese can aspire to a more prosperous and happy future."

Since the government's restructure, the Ministers, Deputy Ministers and Secretaries of State in the government have been as stated in the tables below.

In March 2022, six officials in the government were replaced. The first four replacement officials were sworn in on 22 March 2022, and the remaining two on 31 March 2022. Details of all of those officials, including the dates of their cessation or commencement in office, are included in the tables below.

On 1 July 2023, the government was replaced by the IX Constitutional Government.

=== Ministers ===
Party	Minister	Portrait	Portfolio
PLP	Taur Matan Ruak		Prime Minister; Minister of the Interior; Leader of the People's Liberation Party
KHUNTO	Armanda Berta dos Santos		Deputy Prime Minister; Minister of Social Solidarity and Inclusion
Fretilin	José Maria dos Reis		Deputy Prime Minister; Minister of Planning and Territory
PLP	Fidelis Manuel Leite Magalhães		Minister of the Presidency of the Council of Ministers
Fretilin	Joaquim Amaral		Coordinating Minister of Economic Affairs
Fretilin	Francisco Martins da Costa Pereira Jerónimo		Minister of Parliamentary Affairs and Social Communication
Fretilin	Fernando Hanjam		Minister of Finance (29 May 2020 – 5 November 2020)
Independent	Rui Augusto Gomes		Minister of Finance (23 November 2020 – 1 July 2023)
Fretilin	Adaljíza Albertina Xavier Reis Magno		Minister of Foreign Affairs and Cooperation
PLP	Manuel Cárceres da Costa		Minister of Justice (22 June 2018 – 22 March 2022)
	Tiago Amaral Sarmento		Minister of Justice (22 March 2022 – 1 July 2023)
Fretilin	Miguel Pereira de Carvalho		Minister of State Administration
Fretilin	Odete Maria Freitas Belo		Minister of Health
Fretilin	Armindo Maia		Minister of Education, Youth and Sport
PLP	Longuinhos dos Santos		Minister of Higher Education, Science and Culture
PD	Júlio Sarmento da Costa "Meta Mali"		Minister for the Affairs of National Liberation Combatants
PLP	Salvador Soares dos Reis Pires		Minister of Public Works (22 June 2018 – 22 March 2022)
PLP	Abel Pires da Silva		Minister of Public Works (22 March 2022 – 1 July 2023)
KHUNTO	José Agustinho da Silva		Minister of Transport and Communications
Fretilin	José Lucas do Carmo da Silva		Minister of Tourism, Trade and Industry
KHUNTO	Pedro dos Reis		Minister of Agriculture and Fisheries
Independent	Filomeno da Paixão de Jesus		Minister of Defense
Fretilin	Víctor da Conceição Soares		Minister of Petroleum and Minerals

=== Deputy Ministers ===
Party	Deputy Minister	Portrait	Portfolio
Independent	Sara Lobo Brites		Deputy Minister of Finance (22 June 2018 – 22 March 2022)
	António Freitas		Deputy Minister of Finance (22 March 2022 – July 2023)
KHUNTO	Julião da Silva		Deputy Minister of Foreign Affairs and Cooperation
KHUNTO	José Edmundo Caetano		Deputy Minister of Justice
Fretilin	Lino de Jesus Torrezão		Deputy Minister of State Administration
PLP	Bonifácio Maucoli dos Reis		Deputy Minister of Health
KHUNTO	António Guterres		Deputy Minister of Education, Youth and Sport
PLP	Signi Chandrawati Verdial		Deputy Minister of Social Solidarity
KHUNTO	Nicolau Lino Freitas Belo		Deputy Minister of Public Works
Fretilin	Inácia da Conceição Teixeira		Deputy Minister of Community and Cultural Tourism
Fretilin	Domingos Lopes Antunes		Deputy Minister of Trade and Industry
KHUNTO	Abílio Xavier de Araújo		Deputy Minister of Agriculture and Fisheries
KHUNTO	António Armindo		Deputy Minister of the Interior

=== Secretaries of State ===
Party	Secretary of State	Portrait	Portfolio
KHUNTO	Alarico de Rosário		Secretary of State for Vocational Training and Employment
Fretilin	Elizário Ferreira		Secretary of State for Cooperatives
PLP	Demetrio do Amaral de Carvalho		Secretary of State for the Environment
PLP	Merício Juvenal dos Reis "Akara"		Secretary of State for Communications
KHUNTO	Mário Ximenes		Secretary of State for Land and Property (22 June 2018 – 22 March 2022)
KHUNTO	Eldino Rodrigues dos Santos		Secretary of State for Land and Property (31 March 2022 – 1 July 2023)
Fretilin	Abrão Saldanha		Secretary of State for Youth and Sport
PLP	Teófilo Caldas		Secretary of State for Arts and Culture
Independent	Gil da Costa Monteiro Oan Soru		Secretary of State for the Affairs of Combatants of National Liberation (22 June 2018 – c. 14 March 2022)
	Júlio da Conceição "Loro Mesak"		Secretary of State for the Affairs of Combatants of National Liberation (22 March 2022 – 1 July 2023)
KHUNTO	Elídio de Araújo		Secretary of State for Fisheries
KHUNTO	Joaquim José Gusmão dos Reis Martins		Secretary of State for Civil Protection
PLP	Maria José da Fonseca Monteiro de Jesus		Secretary of State for Equality and Inclusion (22 June 2018 – 22 March 2022)
PLP	Maria do Rosário Fátima Correia		Secretary of State for Equality and Inclusion (31 March 2022 – 1 July 2023)
