= Ministry of the Presidency of the Council of Ministers (Timor-Leste) =

Ministry in the government of Timor-Leste

- Portuguese: Ministério da Presidência do Conselho de Ministros; Tetum: Ministériu Prezidénsia Konsellu Ministrus
- Coat of Arms of Timor-Leste

Ministry overview
- Jurisdiction: Government of Timor-Leste
- Headquarters: Government Palace, Dili; 8°33′16″S 125°34′43″E
- Minister responsible: Ágio Pereira, Minister of the Presidency of the Council of Ministers
- Agency ID: MPCM / MPKM

The Ministry of the Presidency of the Council of Ministers (Portuguese: Ministério da Presidência do Conselho de Ministros (MPCM), Tetum: Ministériu Prezidénsia Konsellu Ministrus (MPKM)) is the government department of Timor-Leste accountable for the coordination of the government.

== Functions ==
The Ministry's primary responsibilities are:

- coordinating the preparation and organization of Government work;
- monitoring and evaluating the implementation of decisions taken by the Council of Ministers; and
- coordinating legal support and consultation with the Council of Ministers.

== Council of Ministers ==
The Council of Ministers is chaired by the Prime Minister. It includes the Deputy Prime Ministers (Note: The Constitution of Timor-Leste provides, in sections 104 and 105, for the appointment of officials referred to in its English language version as "Deputy Ministers". In other English language publications, those officials are commonly referred to as "Vice Ministers", even though the word "Vice", in context, arguably has a different meaning in English from the word "Deputy". In this article, the constitutional expression "Deputy" is used.) and the Ministers. Unless otherwise determined by the Prime Minister, the Deputy Minister for Parliamentary Affairs participates in meetings of the Council of Ministers, without voting rights.

Any Deputy Ministers and Secretaries of State who may be summoned to a meeting of the Council of Ministers, on the express recommendation of the Prime Minister, participate in the Council of Ministers without the right to vote, except when replacing the Minister they are assisting.

== Minister ==
The incumbent Minister of the Presidency of the Council of Ministers is Ágio Pereira.

== See also ==
- Politics of Timor-Leste
