= Salvador Soares dos Reis Pires =

East Timorese politician

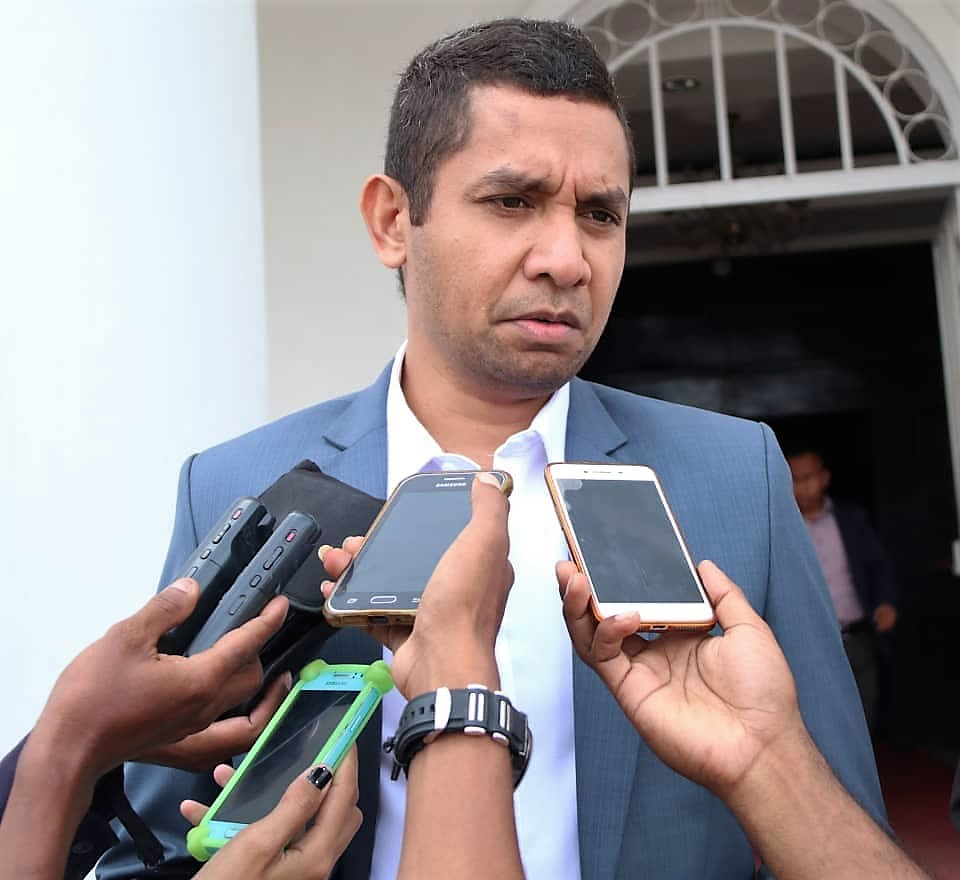
- Pires in 2019

Minister of Public Works
- In office 22 June 2018 – 22 March 2022
- Prime Minister: Taur Matan Ruak
- Preceded by: Vacant
- Succeeded by: Abel Pires da Silva

Personal details
- Party: People's Liberation Party

Salvador Eugénio Soares dos Reis Pires is an East Timorese politician and a member of the People's Liberation Party (Tetum: Partidu Libertasaun Popular, PLP).

Between June 2018 and March 2022, he was the Minister of Public Works, serving in the VIII Constitutional Government of East Timor headed by Prime Minister Taur Matan Ruak.

Pires is an alumnus of the Australian Development Scholarship program. He graduated in 2007 from Royal Melbourne Institute of Technology (RMIT) in Melbourne, Australia, with a Master of Architecture with first class honours.

During a speech at a ground-breaking ceremony on 11 October 2018 to officially mark the commencement of a US$22.62 million grant by the European Union (UN) as additional financing to help rehabilitate targeted municipal roads under East Timor's ongoing Road Network Upgrading Project, Pires said:

"The Government of Timor-Leste will continue implementing infrastructure plans such as the network of roads in the country, which includes the construction, rehabilitation, and maintenance of national, municipal, and rural roads. This specific network roads project will improve national connectivity that will boost economic and social development activities in the area and the country in general."
