= Signi Chandrawati Verdial =

East Timorese politician (born 1979)

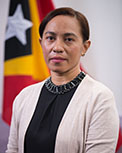

Deputy Minister for Social Solidarity
- In office 22 June 2018 – 1 July 2023

Member of the National Parliament
- In office 2017–2018

Personal details
- Born: 28 September 1979 (age 46) Ainaro, East Timor, Indonesia
- Party: People's Liberation Party

Signi Chandrawati Verdial (born 28 September 1979) is an East Timorese politician. A member of the People's Liberation Party (PLP), Verdial was Deputy Minister for Social Solidarity from 2018 to 2023.

== Early life and education ==
Verdial is the daughter of Luciano Magno and Arttemizaha Verdial. She has a younger sister and is married to José Barros Leong, a former member of RENETIL who graduated from the Christian University Satya Wacana (Universitas Kristen Satya Wacana UKSW) in Salatiga, Indonesia. Together the couple have two sons.

Verdial attended primary school No. 1 in Dili from 1986 to 1992, pre-secondary school SMP 1 in Comoro (Dili) from 1992 to 1995 and secondary school No. 2 in Balide (Dili) from 1995 to 1998. Afterwards Verdial wanted to study in Malang, Indonesia, but the political situation at the end of the Indonesian occupation of East Timor did not allow this. Instead, she was later able to study in New Zealand and received a degree in social sciences from the University of Waikato in 2013.

== Political career ==
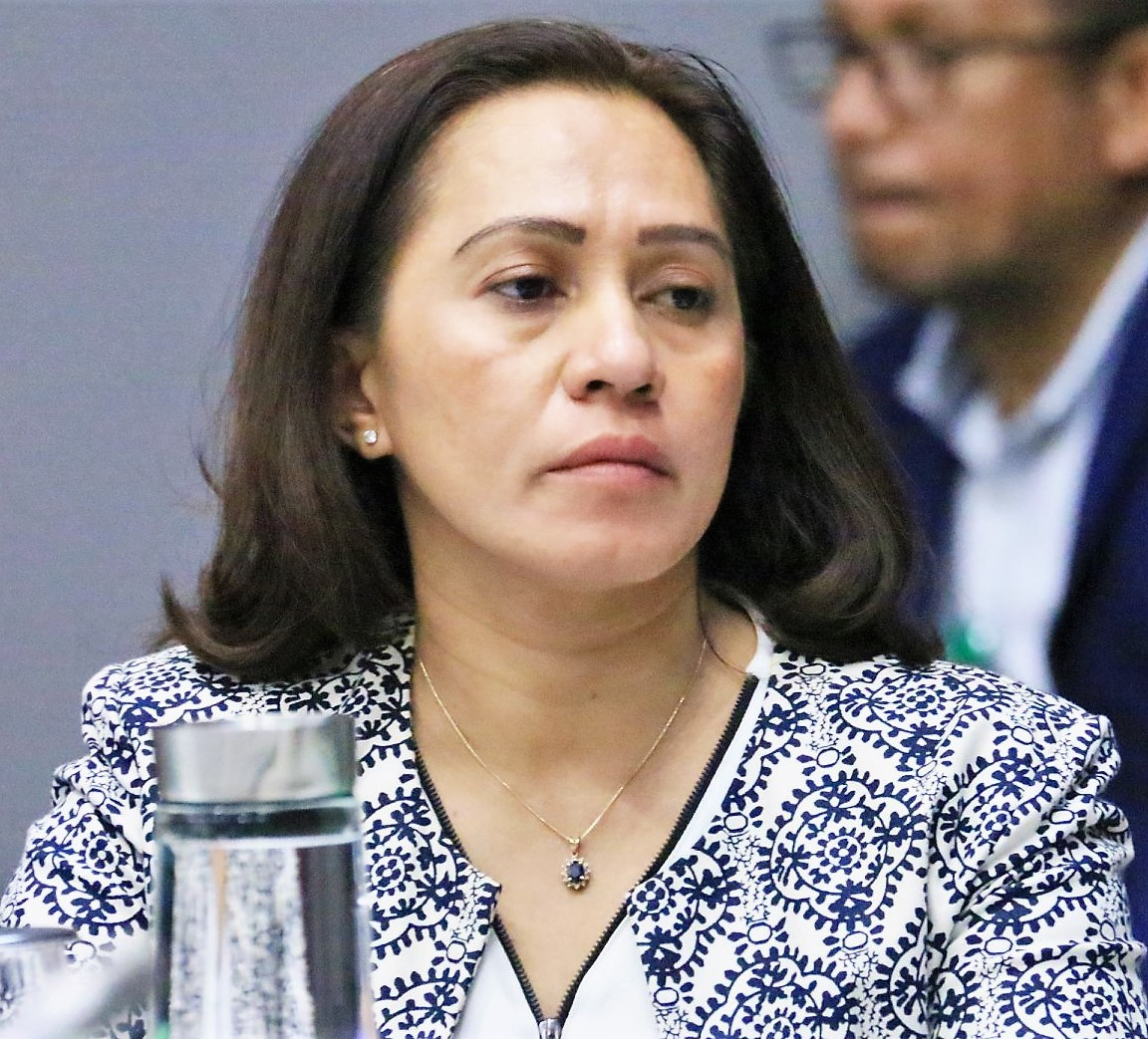
Verdial in 2020

In the 2017 parliamentary election, Verdial narrowly missed out on a place in the National Parliament of East Timor, ranking 9th on the PLP list. Since party leader Taur Matan Ruak gave up his seat in parliament, she was elected as a replacement at the beginning of the legislative period on 5 September 2017. In parliament, she became vice-president of the Commission for Constitutional Affairs, Justice, Public Administration, Local Jurisdiction and Anti-Corruption (Commission A) and a deputy member of the Parliament's Administrative Council.

In the 2018 parliamentary elections, Verdial missed a place in parliament, ranking 45th on the Aliança para Mudança e Progresso (AMP), the joint list of PLP, CNRT and KHUNTO. Instead, Verdial was sworn in as Deputy Minister for Social Solidarity on 22 June. She held the office until the end of the legislative period.
