= Sérgio de Jesus Fernandes da Costa Hornai =

East Timorese politician

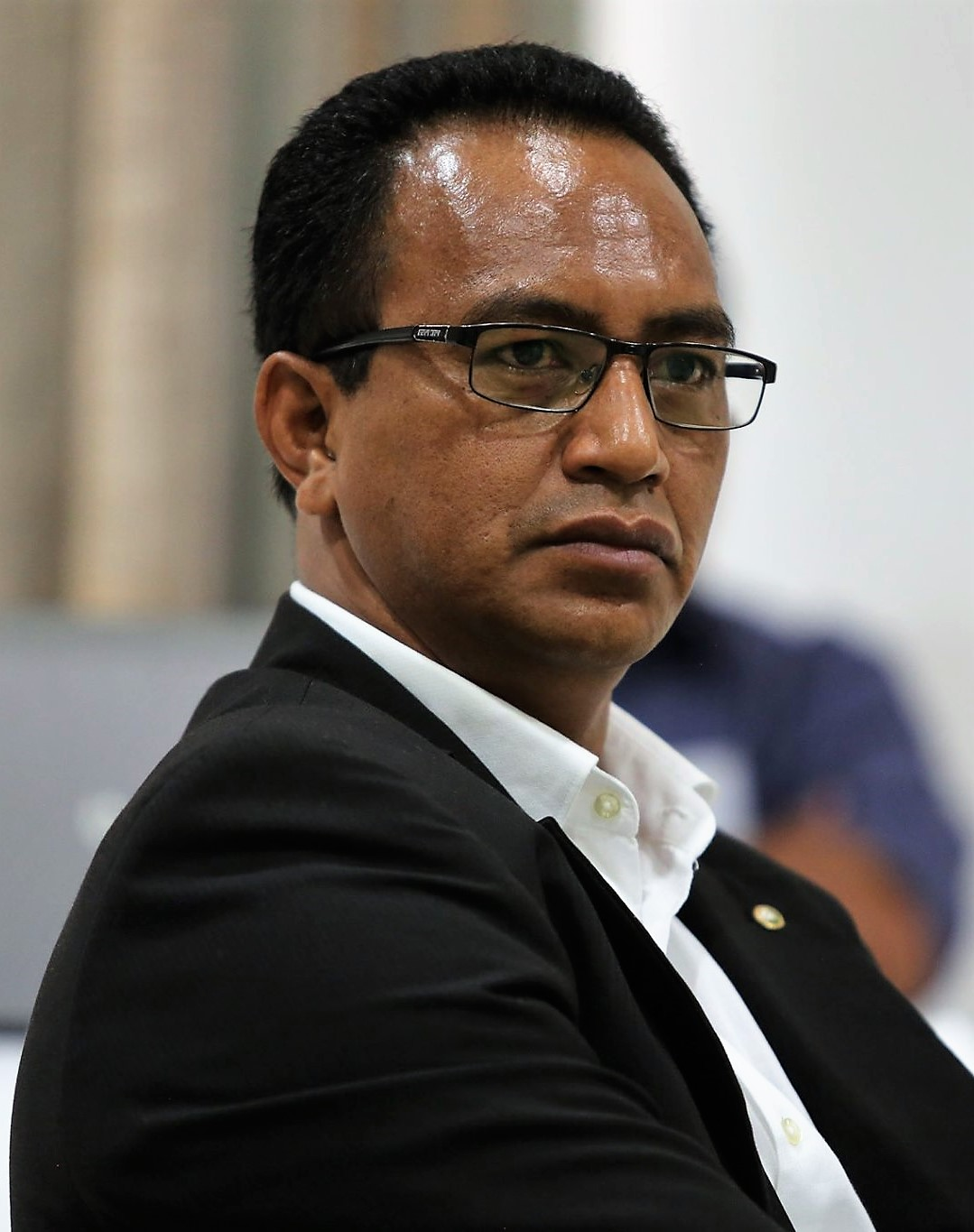
- Hornai in 2020

Minister of Justice
- Incumbent
- Assumed office 15 February 2024
- Prime Minister: Xanana Gusmão
- Preceded by: Amândio Benevides

Personal details
- Party: Independent

Sérgio de Jesus Fernandes da Costa Hornai is an East Timorese lawyer and independent politician.

He is the incumbent minister of justice, serving since 15 February 2024 in the IX Constitutional Government of Timor-Leste led by Prime Minister Xanana Gusmão.
