= Minister of Agriculture and Fisheries (Timor-Leste) =

East Timorese government minister

- Portuguese: Ministro da Agricultura e Pescas; Tetum: Ministru Agrikultura no Peskas
- Coat of Arms of Timor-Leste

- Flag of Timor-Leste

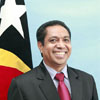
- Incumbent; Marcos da Cruz since 1 July 2023
- Ministry of Agriculture and Fisheries
- Style: Minister; (informal); His Excellency; (formal, diplomatic)
- Member of: Constitutional Government
- Reports to: Prime Minister
- Seat: Dili, Timor-Leste
- Appointer: President of Timor-Leste (following proposal by the Prime Minister of Timor-Leste)
- Inaugural holder: Estanislau da Silva
- Formation: 20 September 2001
- Website: Ministry of Agriculture and Fisheries

The Minister of Agriculture and Fisheries (Portuguese: Ministro da Agricultura e Pescas, Tetum: Ministru Agrikultura no Peskas) is a senior member of the Constitutional Government of Timor-Leste heading the Ministry of Agriculture and Fisheries.

== Functions ==
Under the Constitution of Timor-Leste, the Minister has the power and the duty:

1. to implement the policy defined for the Ministry of Agriculture and Fisheries;
2. to ensure relations between the Government and the other organs of the State in the area of responsibility of the Ministry.

Where the Minister is in charge of the subject matter of a government statute, the Minister is also required, together with the Prime Minister, to sign the statute.

== Incumbent ==
The incumbent Minister of Agriculture, Livestock, Fisheries, and Forestry is Marcos da Cruz.

== List of ministers ==
The following individuals have been appointed as Minister of Agriculture and Fisheries under one or other of its two different titles:

No.	Party	Minister	Portrait	Title	Government (Prime Minister)	Term start	Term end	Term in office
1	Fretilin	Estanislau Aleixo da Silva		Minister of Agriculture and Fisheries	II UNTAET (Alkatiri)	20 September 2001	20 May 2002	5 years, 251 days
1	Fretilin	Estanislau Aleixo da Silva		Minister of Agriculture, Forestry and Fisheries	I Constitutional (Alkatiri)	20 May 2002	10 July 2006	5 years, 251 days
1	Fretilin	Estanislau Aleixo da Silva		Minister of Agriculture, Forestry and Fisheries	II Constitutional (Ramos-Horta)	10 July 2006	19 May 2007	5 years, 251 days
2	Fretilin	Francisco Benevides		Minister of Agriculture, Forestry and Fisheries	III Constitutional (da Silva)	19 May 2007	8 August 2007	81 days
3	PD	Mariano Assanami Sabino		Minister of Agriculture and Fisheries	IV Constitutional (Gusmão)	8 August 2007	8 August 2012	7 years, 192 days
3	PD	Mariano Assanami Sabino		Minister of Agriculture and Fisheries	V Constitutional (Gusmão)	8 August 2012	16 February 2015	7 years, 192 days
(1)	Fretilin	Estanislau Aleixo da Silva		Minister of Agriculture and Fisheries	VI Constitutional (Araújo)	16 February 2015	15 September 2017	3 years, 126 days
(1)	Fretilin	Estanislau Aleixo da Silva		Minister of Agriculture and Fisheries	VII Constitutional (Alkatiri)	15 September 2017	22 June 2018	3 years, 126 days
4	KHUNTO	Joaquim José Gusmão dos Reis Martins		Minister of Agriculture and Fisheries	VIII Constitutional (Ruak)	22 June 2018	29 May 2020	1 year, 342 days
5	KHUNTO	Pedro dos Reis		Minister of Agriculture and Fisheries	VIII Constitutional (Ruak) (restructured)	29 May 2020	1 July 2023	3 years, 33 days
6	CNRT	Marcos da Cruz		Minister of Agriculture, Livestock, Fisheries, and Forestry	IX Constitutional (Gusmão)	1 July 2023	Incumbent	3 years, 68 days
