= Ministry of Agriculture and Fisheries (Timor-Leste) =

Ministry in the government of Timor-Leste

- Ministério da Agricultura e Pescas (Portuguese); Ministériu Agrikultura no Peskas (Tetum)
- Coat of Arms of Timor-Leste

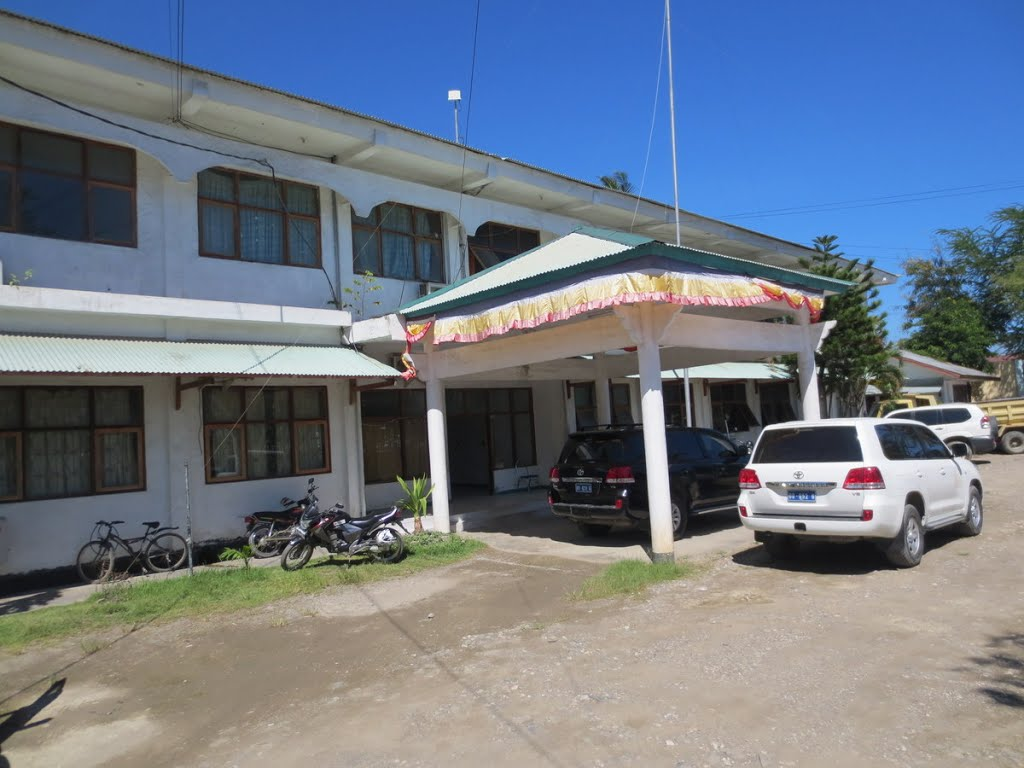
- Forestry Office of the Ministry, Caicoli, Dili

Ministry overview
- Formed: 2001
- Jurisdiction: Government of Timor-Leste
- Headquarters: Av. Nicolao Lobato, Comoro, Dili; 8°33′19″S 125°32′2″E
- Minister responsible: Marcos da Cruz, Minister of Agriculture, Livestock, Fisheries, and Forestry
- Website: Ministry of Agriculture and Fisheries
- Agency ID: MAF

The Ministry of Agriculture and Fisheries (MAF; Portuguese: Ministério da Agricultura e Pescas, Tetum: Ministériu Agrikultura no Peskas) is the government department of Timor-Leste accountable for agriculture, fisheries, and related matters.

== Functions ==
The Ministry is responsible for the design, implementation, coordination and evaluation of policy for the following areas:

- agriculture;
- forests;
- fisheries; and
- livestock.

== Minister ==
The incumbent Minister of Agriculture, Livestock, Fisheries, and Forestry is Marcos da Cruz.

== See also ==
- List of agriculture ministries
- Politics of Timor-Leste
