= Minister of Public Works (Timor-Leste) =

East Timorese government minister

- Ministro das Obras Públicas (Portuguese); Ministru Obras Públikas (Tetum)
- Coat of Arms of Timor-Leste

- Flag of Timor-Leste
- Incumbent; Samuel Marçal since 1 July 2023
- Ministry of Public Works
- Style: Minister; (informal); His Excellency; (formal, diplomatic)
- Member of: Constitutional Government
- Reports to: Prime Minister
- Appointer: President of Timor-Leste (following proposal by the Prime Minister of Timor-Leste)
- Inaugural holder: Eduardo Carlos dos Anjos "Kaku'uk"; (1975); João Viegas Carrascalão; (2000)
- Formation: 1975 / 2000
- Website: Ministry of Public Works

The Minister of Public Works (Portuguese: Ministro das Obras Públicas, Tetum: Ministru Obras Públikas) is a senior member of the Constitutional Government of Timor-Leste heading the Ministry of Public Works.

== Functions ==
Under the Constitution of Timor-Leste, the Minister has the power and the duty:

1. to implement the policy defined for the Ministry of Public Works;
2. to ensure relations between the Government and the other organs of the State in the area of responsibility of the Ministry.

Where the Minister is in charge of the subject matter of a government statute, the Minister is also required, together with the Prime Minister, to sign the statute.

== Incumbent ==
The incumbent Minister of Public Works is Samuel Marçal.

== List of ministers ==
The following individuals have been appointed as the minister:

No.	Party	Minister	Portrait	Title	Government (Prime Minister)	Term start	Term end	Term in office
1	Fretilin	Eduardo Carlos dos Anjos "Kaku'uk"		Minister of Public Works, Transport and Communications	1975 CoM (Lobato)	1 December 1975	17 December 1975	16 days
2	UDT	João Viegas Carrascalão		Minister for Infrastructure	I UNTAET (Vieira de Mello)	15 July 2000	16 July 2001	1 year, 1 day
3	Fretilin	Ovídio de Jesus Amaral		Minister for Infrastructure	I UNTAET (Vieira de Mello)	16 July 2001	20 September 2001	66 days
4	Fretilin	César Vital Moreira		Minister of Water and Public Works	II UNTAET (Alkatiri)	20 September 2001	20 May 2002	242 days
(3)	Fretilin	Ovídio Amaral		Minister of Transport, Communications and Public Works	I Constitutional (Alkatiri)	20 May 2002	26 July 2005	3 years, 67 days
5	Independent	Odete Vítor		Minister of Public Works	I Constitutional (Alkatiri)	26 July 2005	1 June 2006	2 years, 13 days
5	Independent	Odete Vítor		Minister of Public Works	II Constitutional (Ramos-Horta)	10 July 2006	19 May 2007	2 years, 13 days
5	Independent	Odete Vítor		Minister of Public Works	III Constitutional (da Silva)	19 May 2007	8 August 2007	2 years, 13 days
6	Independent	Pedro Lay		Minister of Infrastructure	IV Constitutional (Gusmão)	8 August 2007	8 August 2012	5 years, 0 days
7	PD	Gastão Francisco de Sousa		Minister of Public Works	V Constitutional (Gusmão)	8 August 2012	16 February 2015	5 years, 38 days
7	PD (to 2016)	Gastão Francisco de Sousa		Minister of Public Works, Transport and Communications	VI Constitutional (Araújo)	16 February 2015	15 September 2017	5 years, 38 days
7	Independent	Gastão Francisco de Sousa		Minister of Public Works, Transport and Communications	VI Constitutional (Araújo)	16 February 2015	15 September 2017	5 years, 38 days
		Vacant			VII Constitutional (Alkatiri)	3 October 2017	22 June 2018	262 days
8	PLP	Salvador Soares dos Reis Pires		Minister of Public Works	VIII Constitutional (Ruak)	22 June 2018	22 March 2022	3 years, 273 days
9	PLP	Abel Pires da Silva		Minister of Public Works	VIII Constitutional (Ruak)	22 March 2022	1 July 2023	1 year, 101 days
10	CNRT	Samuel Marçal		Minister of Public Works	IX Constitutional (Gusmão)	1 July 2023	Incumbent	3 years, 69 days
