= Joaquim Gusmão Martins =

East Timorese politician

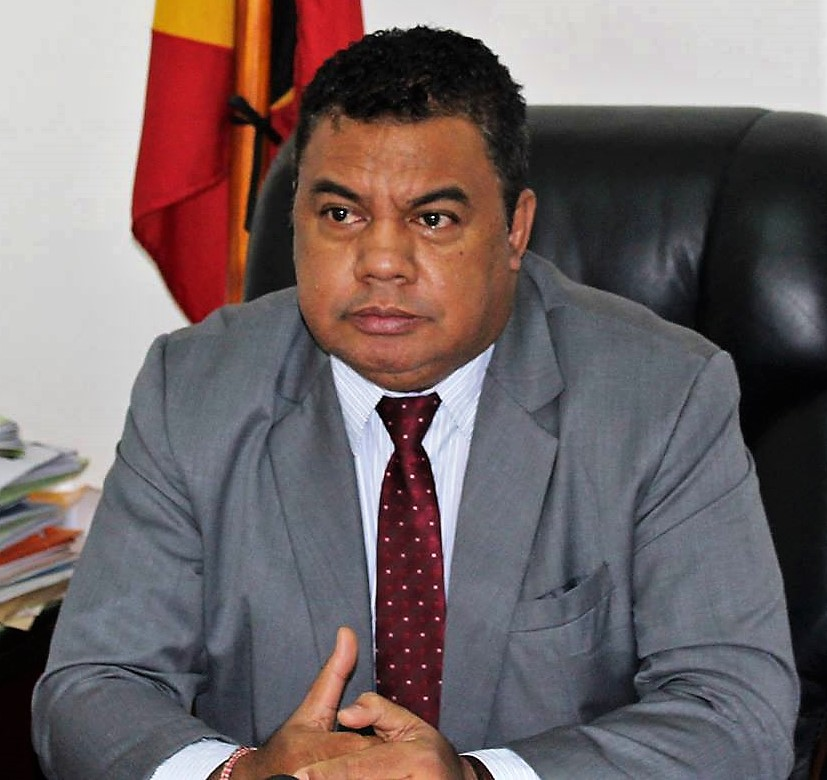
- Martins in 2019

Secretary of State for Civil Protection
- In office 24 June 2020 – 1 July 2023
- Prime Minister: Taur Matan Ruak
- Preceded by: Alexandrino de Araújo
- Succeeded by: Domingos Mariano Reis

Minister of Agriculture and Fisheries
- In office 22 June 2018 – 24 June 2020
- Prime Minister: Taur Matan Ruak
- Preceded by: Estanislau da Silva
- Succeeded by: Pedro dos Reis

Personal details
- Party: KHUNTO

Joaquim José Gusmão dos Reis Martins is an East Timorese politician and a member of the Kmanek Haburas Unidade Nasional Timor Oan (KHUNTO) political party.

From June 2020 to July 2023, he was the Secretary of State for Civil Protection, serving since under the VIII Constitutional Government of East Timor led by Taur Matan Ruak. Previously, from 2018 to 2020, he was Minister of Agriculture and Fisheries in the same government.
