= Minister of the Presidency of the Council of Ministers (Timor-Leste) =

East Timorese government minister

- Ministro da Presidência do Conselho de Ministros (Portuguese); Ministru Prezidénsia Konsellu Ministrus (Tetum)
- Coat of Arms of Timor-Leste

- Flag of Timor-Leste

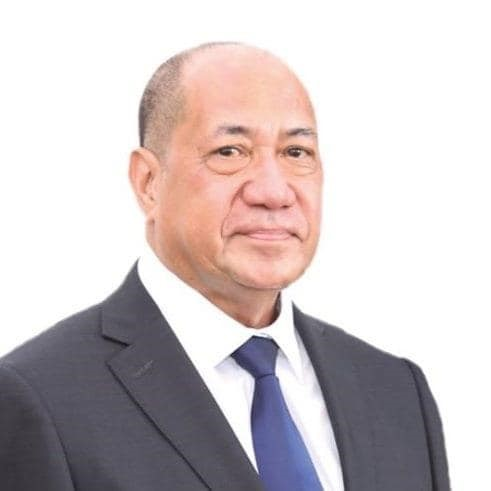
- Incumbent; Ágio Pereira since 1 July 2023
- Ministry of the Presidency of the Council of Ministers
- Style: Minister; (informal); His Excellency; (formal, diplomatic)
- Member of: Constitutional Government
- Reports to: Prime Minister
- Appointer: President of Timor-Leste (following proposal by the Prime Minister of Timor-Leste)
- Formation: 2003 / 2012
- First holder: Ana Pessoa Pinto

The Minister of the Presidency of the Council of Ministers (Portuguese: Ministro da Presidência do Conselho de Ministros, Tetum: Ministru Prezidénsia Konsellu Ministrus) is a senior member of the Constitutional Government of Timor-Leste heading the Ministry of the Presidency of the Council of Ministers.

== Functions ==
Under the Constitution of Timor-Leste, the Minister has the power and the duty:

1. to implement the policy defined for the Ministry of the Presidency of the Council of Ministers;
2. to ensure relations between the Government and the other organs of the State in the area of responsibility of the Ministry.

Where the Minister is in charge of the subject matter of a government statute, the Minister is also required, together with the Prime Minister, to sign the statute.

== Incumbent ==
The incumbent Minister of the Presidency of the Council of Ministers is Ágio Pereira.
