= Demetrio do Amaral de Carvalho =

Environmentalist from East Timor

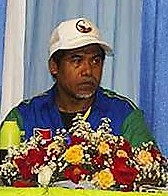
- de Carvalho in 2017
- Born: July 2, 1966 (age 60); Dili, East Timor
- Education: Gadjah Mada University (B.S.)
- Occupations: Environmental Scientist, politician
- Employer: Haburas
- Spouse: Santina Carvalho (deceased)
- Children: 4
- Awards: Goldman Environmental Prize (2004)

Demetrio do Amaral de Carvalho (b. East Timor, 2 July 1966) is an environmentalist from East Timor. He has been State Secretary for the Environment since 2018.

== Background ==
de Carvalho grew up in villages south of Liquica on the north coast of East Timor, and was 9 years old when in 1975 his father was murdered by members of FRETILIN. In the same year Indonesia occupied East Timor. He hid in the jungle until the age of 13, and became a resistance fighter against the period of Indonesian occupation. In 1988, with his education disrupted by the war, Carvalho graduated from the SMA 5 school in Yogyakarta, Indonesia. He later joined National Resistance of East Timorese Students (Portuguese: Resistência Nacional dos Estudantes de Timor-Leste (RENETIL)), East Timor's leading student resistance movement. de Carvalho was involved in the publication of the first RENETIL magazines. In 1990 he graduated from Gadjah Mada University with a degree in environmental sciences. One week after the 1991 Santa Cruz massacre, Carvalho was arrested by Indonesian police and detained without trial for three weeks. The reason was his participation in a protest in Jakarta.

== Environmental activism ==
Carvalho was a founder of the environmental organization, the Haburas Foundation. Haburas is one of East Timor's only environmental NGOs. It began shortly before East Timorese independence (formed in 1998) and has attracted wide acclaim for its efforts to support environmental programs and Timorese values, particularly Tara Bandu, a customary law that enables traditional ecological wisdom. Haburas means "to make something green and fresh" in Tetum. The organization runs classes and supports programs to create sustainable livelihoods, through agricultural, craft, and ecotourism projects. Haburas succeeded in bringing environmental protection into the East Timor constitution (Section 61).

== In politics ==
Carvalho is a member of the Partidu Libertasaun Popular (PLP). On 20 May 2017 he became one of six deputies selected by party leader Taur Matan Ruak. In the parliamentary elections in East Timor in 2017, Carvalho took fifth place on the PLP's list and thus became a member of parliament. He became chairman of the Committee for Economic Affairs and Development (Committee D). He was sworn in on June 22, 2018, as Secretary of State for the Environment.

== Recognition ==
do Carvalho was awarded the Goldman Environmental Prize in 2004, for his early work with Haburas. Video on the Prizewinner

== Other ==
do Carvalho's wife Santina died in 2019. The couple had been married since 1995 and had three sons and a daughter.

== Publications ==
- Batterbury S.P.J, L.R.Palmer, T.Reuter, D. do Amaral de Carvalho, B. Kehi, A. Cullen. 2015. Land access and livelihoods in post-conflict Timor-Leste: no magic bullets. International Journal of the Commons. 9(2): 619–647. http://doi.org/10.18352/ijc.514
- do Amaral de Carvalho, D. and L.R. Palmer. 2011. Engaging communities in resource management initiatives in Timor Leste. In M. Langton, J.L. Longbottom (eds.). Community Futures, Legal Architecture: Foundations for Indigenous Peoples in the global mining boom. London: Routledge.
- Demetrio do Amaral de Carvalho (ed.). 2011. Local Knowledge of Timor-Leste! Jakarta: UNESCO.
- Lisa R. Palmer, Demetrio do Amaral de Carvalho. 2008. Nation building and resource management: the politics of 'nature' in Timor Leste. Geoforum 39: 1321–1332
- Sandlund, O.T., I. Bryceson, D. de Carvalho, N. Rio, J. da Silva and M.I. Silva. 2001. Assessing Environmental Needs and Priorities in East Timor: Final Report. Dili, Trondheim: UNDP-Dili and Norwegian Institute for Nature Research.
