= Gil da Costa Monteiro =

East Timorese politician

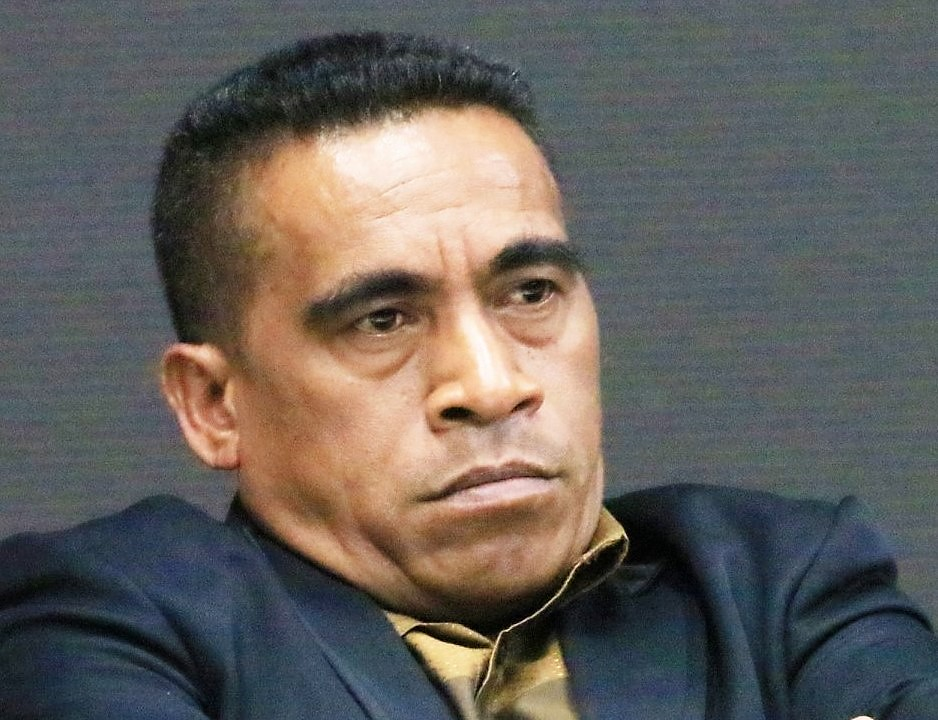
- Monteiro in 2020

Minister of National Liberation Fighter Affairs
- Incumbent
- Assumed office 1 July 2023
- Prime Minister: Xanana Gusmão
- Preceded by: Júlio Sarmento da Costa "Meta Mali"; (as Minister for the Affairs of Combatants of National Liberation)

Secretary of State for the Affairs of Combatants of National Liberation
- In office 22 June 2018 – c. 14 March 2022
- Prime Minister: Taur Matan Ruak
- Preceded by: André da Costa Belo; (as Secretary of State for Veterans)
- Succeeded by: Júlio da Conceição "Loro Mesak"

Personal details
- Party: National Congress for Timorese Reconstruction (CNRT)

Gil da Costa Monteiro, also known by his nom de guerre Oan Soru, is an East Timorese politician, and a member of the National Congress for Timorese Reconstruction (Portuguese: Congresso Nacional de Reconstrução de Timor, CNRT).

He is the incumbent Minister of National Liberation Fighter Affairs, serving since July 2023 in the IX Constitutional Government of Timor-Leste led by Prime Minister Xanana Gusmão.
