= José Reis (politician) =

East Timorese politician

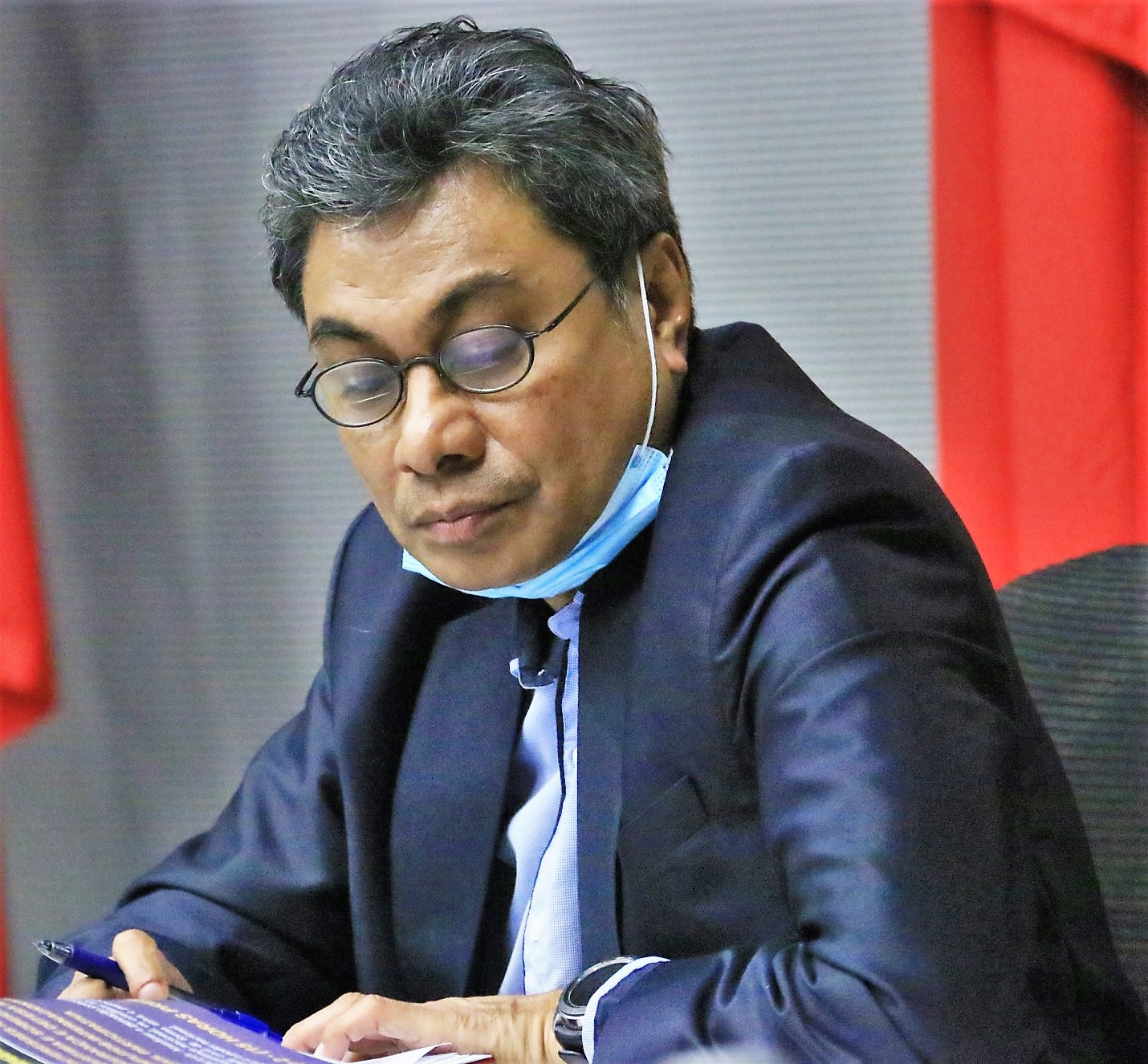
- Reis in 2020

Deputy Prime Minister of East Timor
- In office 24 June 2020 – 1 July 2023 Serving with Armanda Berta dos Santos
- Prime Minister: Taur Matan Ruak
- Preceded by: Office re-established
- Succeeded by: Francisco Kalbuadi Lay and; Mariano Sabino Lopes

Minister of Planning and Territory
- In office 24 June 2020 – 1 July 2023
- Prime Minister: Taur Matan Ruak
- Preceded by: Office established
- Succeeded by: Office abolished

Deputy Minister of the Prime Minister for Governance Affairs
- In office 3 October 2017 – 22 June 2018
- Prime Minister: Mari Alkatiri
- Preceded by: Office established
- Succeeded by: Office abolished

Secretary of State for the Coordination of Region I (Lautem, Viqueque and Baucau)
- In office 26 July 2005 – 8 August 2007
- Prime Minister: Mari Alkatiri; (to 26 June 2006); José Ramos-Horta; (26 June 2006–19 May 2007); Estanislau da Silva; (from 19 May 2007)
- Preceded by: Office established
- Succeeded by: Office abolished

Member of the National Parliament
- In office 2001–2005

Personal details
- Born: José Maria dos Reis Costa; 5 February 1956 (age 70)
- Party: Fretilin

José Maria dos Reis Costa is an East Timorese politician, and a member of the Fretilin political party.

From June 2020 to July 2023, he was the more junior of East Timor's two Deputy Prime Ministers, (Note: The Constitution of Timor-Leste provides, in sections 104 and 105, for the appointment of officials referred to in its English language version as "Deputy Ministers". In other English language publications, those officials are commonly referred to as "Vice Ministers", even though the word "Vice", in context, arguably has a different meaning in English from the word "Deputy". In this article, the constitutional expression "Deputy" is used.) and also the Minister of Planning and Territory, in the VIII Constitutional Government of East Timor led by Prime Minister Taur Matan Ruak.

Previously, he served as a Minister, and as a Secretary of State, in earlier Constitutional Governments.

== Early life and career ==
Reis is a member of a noble family from Bucoli in the Baucau Municipality of East Timor. During the Indonesian occupation of East Timor, he worked as an official in the Indonesian Ministry of Foreign Affairs.

According to Australian journalist and author Jill Jolliffe, Reis's older brother, Vicente, "... was one of a group of radical students who ... studied in Portugal and [fell] under the influence of Marxist-Leninist ideas. Yet he [was] never ... connected with fanaticism, nor with the ill-treatment of alleged dissidents ... On the contrary, there [are] many stories of his role as a gentle teacher behind guerilla lines, and he ... died a lingering death from untreated wounds ..."

== Political career ==
Reis is a long time member of Fretilin. In 2001, he was elected as a Fretilin candidate to the Constituent Assembly of East Timor, from which the National Parliament emerged in 2002.

On 26 July 2005, as part of a restructure by Prime Minister Mari Alkatiri of the I Constitutional Government in response to tensions within the Fretilin party, Reis was sworn in to one of five new positions in the executive, the key electoral role of Secretary of State for the Coordination of Region I (Lautem, Viqueque and Baucau). He held that office until 8 August 2007.

Reis's house was burned to the ground during the 2006 East Timorese crisis.

On 3 October 2017, Reis was sworn in as Deputy Minister of the Prime Minister for Governance Affairs in the VII Constitutional Government. He remained in that office until the formation of the VIII Constitutional Government on 22 June 2018.

Following a change in the governing coalition, and the admission of Fretilin to the VIII Constitutional Government, Reis was sworn in as Deputy Prime Minister and Minister of Planning and Territory in that government on 24 June 2020.

In April 2021, Reis, in both of his official capacities, led the government's response to Cyclone Seroja and its associated rain and flooding, which he described as the worst incident in East Timor in 40 years. As well as making a statement to the media, he participated in a visit by government officials to the St John Paul II area at Tasitolu to observe the damage caused by the flooding and support its victims, and, later, chaired an official meeting to analyse an interim report by a technical team that had surveyed the damage, and estimated repair costs at US$24 million.

During July 2021, Reis, as extraordinary envoy of the President of East Timor, Francisco Guterres, led an 18-member East Timorese delegation to the 12th Summit of the Community of Portuguese Language Countries (Portuguese: Comunidade dos Países de Língua Portuguesa, CPLP) in Luanda, Angola. En route to the Summit, he paid a courtesy call to Lisbon, Portugal, where he met with Portuguese leaders to discuss the strengthening of cooperation between the two countries. On 17 July 2021, in the course of a speech at the general debate of the Summit, he said [translation]:

"We need to move towards prosperity and we must do so without neglecting other CPLP objectives. In fact, the CPLP gets it right, based on the history, language and culture that make its members cohesive. If building requires looking to the past, looking to the future requires keeping our nature in mind."

At the Summit, the member countries signed an agreement providing for mobility of doctors, business people and academics between them. Reis later confirmed that the East Timorese delegation to the Summit had addressed the preparation of the approved processes for the agreed mobilities.

Reis's tenure as Deputy Prime Minister and Minister ended when the IX Constitutional Government took office on 1 July 2023.
