= Taroman =

Mountain in Cova Lima district of East Timor

Coordinates: 9°12′47″S 125°08′39″E

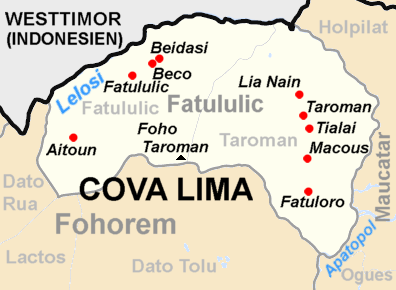
The Foho Taroman in Fatululic subdistrict, Cova Lima, East Timor

Taroman is the highest mountain in the Cova Lima district of East Timor. The mountain’s summit is approximately 1730 metres above sea level. It houses a cloud forest, which is approximately 20 km^{2} in diameter. This forest is home to at least 53 bird species, and 300-500 plant species. The area’s biodiversity is threatened by free-range livestock.

== Sources ==
- Lolo Taroman
