= Samuel Marçal =

East Timorese politician

Minister of Public Works
- Incumbent
- Assumed office 1 July 2023
- Preceded by: Abel Pires da Silva

Personal details
- Party: National Congress for Timorese Reconstruction (CNRT)

Samuel Marçal is an East Timorese politician, and a member of the National Congress for Timorese Reconstruction (Portuguese: Congresso Nacional de Reconstrução de Timor, CNRT).

He is the incumbent Minister of Public Works, serving since July 2023 in the IX Constitutional Government of East Timor led by Prime Minister Xanana Gusmão.
