= Marcos da Cruz =

East Timorese politician

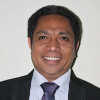

Minister of Agriculture, Livestock, Fisheries, and Forestry
- Incumbent
- Assumed office 1 July 2023
- Preceded by: Pedro dos Reis; (as Minister of Agriculture and Fisheries)

Vice Minister of Agriculture and Fisheries
- In office 8 August 2012 – 15 September 2017
- Prime Minister: Xanana Gusmão; (8 August 2012 – 16 February 2015); Rui Maria de Araújo; (16 February 2015 – 15 September 2017)
- Preceded by: Office created
- Succeeded by: Deolindo da Silva

Secretary of State for Agriculture and Arboriculture
- In office 8 August 2007 – 8 August 2012
- Prime Minister: Xanana Gusmão
- Preceded by: Office created
- Succeeded by: João Fernandes; (as Secretary of State for Forestry and Nature Conservation); Valentino Varela; (as Secretary of State for Livestock)

Personal details
- Party: National Congress for Timorese Reconstruction (CNRT)

Marcos da Cruz is an East Timorese politician, and a member of the National Congress for Timorese Reconstruction (Portuguese: Congresso Nacional de Reconstrução de Timor, CNRT).

He is the incumbent Minister of Agriculture, Livestock, Fisheries, and Forestry, serving since July 2023 in the IX Constitutional Government of East Timor led by Prime Minister Xanana Gusmão.
