= National Resistance of East Timorese Students =

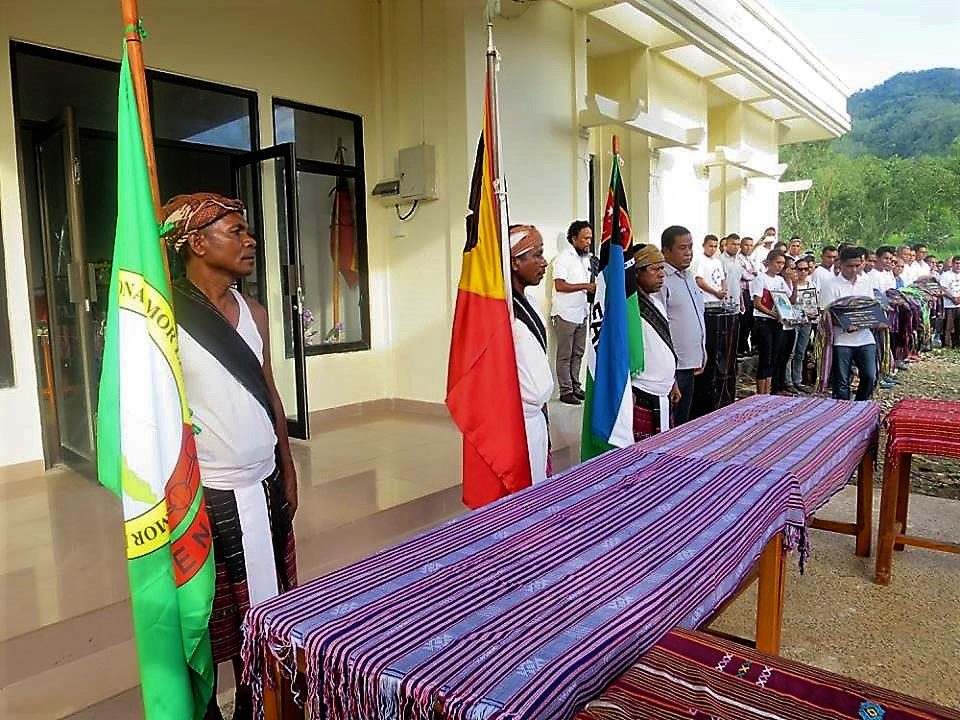
Commemoration for martyrs of the RENETIL (2017). The green flag is the flag of RENETIL.

The National Resistance of East Timorese Students (Portuguese: Resistência Nacional dos Estudantes de Timor-Leste (RENETIL)) was a resistance movement of students from East Timor against the Indonesian occupation between 1975 and 1999. RENETIL was established on June 20, 1988, in Denpasar, Bali, Indonesia, by ten East Timorese students led by Fernando de Araújo as General Secretary. This organization was later extended to other cities in Indonesia with East Timorese students.

== History ==
Following the Santa Cruz massacre in Dili in 1991, RENETIL organized its first demonstration in Jakarta a week later. Originally it was supposed to take place with the stopover of the Portuguese Parliament delegation en route to East Timor, but the trip was cancelled. Demonstrators were sent to Jakarta from each regional group of RENETIL, including eight from Yogyakarta. A total of 72 people demonstrated in front of the United Nations office on November 19. As they crossed the street towards the Japanese Embassy, they were all arrested. Fernando de Araújo was arrested on November 24, charged with subversion and sentenced to nine years in prison, of which he served more than six years. The rest of the leadership was also arrested. José Antonio Neves, chosen to replace Araújo, was imprisoned just four months later.

Nevertheless, RENETIL persisted and now attempted to "Indonesianize" the East Timor conflict by establishing contact with Indonesian opposition groups fighting against the Suharto regime. The main organizations were the People's Democratic Union PRD and the Student Solidarity for Democracy SMID. It founded the solidarity movement Indonesian People's Solidarity with the Maubere People SPRIM. This cooperation also led to a rethink within the Indonesian democracy movement on the East Timor issue. On the other hand, the democracy movement itself was driven by the East Timorese students. They often formed the heart of the groups and also promoted a more militant line. While Indonesians protested mostly peacefully at demonstrations, the East Timorese threw stones and burned pictures of President Suharto, affecting the military's response to the demonstrations and the movement.

In addition, one began to infiltrate the East Timor Association of University and High School Students (Indonesian: Ikatan Mahasiswa dan Pelajar Timor Timur (IMPETTU) (also IMPETU)), the state Indonesian-East Timorese student organization. Since 1989 all IMPETTU leaders in Denpasar were members of RENETIL. In 1993 and 1994, RENETIL members won several internal IMPETTU elections. The Indonesian military and the Indonesian governor of East Timor, José Abílio Osório Soares, then began to veto candidates they did not like. RENETIL began to circumvent this measure by gradually changing the individual IMPETTU chapters from 1996 onwards to their official status and their political programs towards supporters of East Timor's independence. The internal elections were now conducted without regime oversight, further increasing RENETIL's influence within IMPETTU. From September 1996, the IMPETTU local chapters placed themselves under the leadership and coordination of RENETIL Deputy General Secretary Mariano Sabino Lopes.

On December 7, 1995, students from RENETIL, IMPETTU and the Associação Socialista Timorense AST demonstrated together in front of the embassies of the Netherlands and Russia in Jakarta. They were joined by Indonesian pro-democracy activists. In March 1997, a group of RENETIL activists broke into the Austrian embassy in Jakarta. They were able to ensure that the representative of the UN Secretary-General, Jamsheed Marker, to meet the imprisoned FALINTIL leader Xanana Gusmão during his stopover in Jakarta on his way to East Timor. After the action, 20 RENETIL members were arrested. As punishment, they were stripped of their Indonesian ID cards and stripped of all Indonesian citizenship rights. Under the pretext of holding IMPETTU events, RENETIL organized various underground actions. While IMPETTU brought together East Timorese students from all over Indonesia for sports competitions, seminars and cultural festivals, RENETIL organized political meetings.

On May 21, 1998, President Suharto resigned and his successor Jusuf Habibie introduced democratic reforms. On behalf of RENETIL, Mariano Sabino Lopes called on June 6, 1998, for a conference of the regional heads of IMPETTU. The individual associations were now officially united on it and an IMPETTU leadership council (DPP IMPETTU) was founded under Mariano Sabino Lopes. On June 12, the largest East Timor demonstration in Indonesia took place in front of the Foreign Ministry building in Jakarta. Over 1800 IMPETTU members called for an independence referendum. The police violently ended the demonstration. Despite this, there were further demonstrations in various places in Jakarta in the following weeks.

Finally, on August 30, 1999, the independence referendum took place in East Timor, in which the population voted in favor of independence from Indonesia with a clear majority. After a last wave of violence and the intervention of the international protection force INTERFET, the United Nations took over administration and finally released East Timor into independence in 2002. In the Partido Democrático, founded in 2001, there are numerous former members of RENETIL. Fernando de Araújo was party leader of the PD until his death in 2015 and most recently Minister of State, Coordinator for Social Affairs and Minister for Education. Mariano Sabino Lopes is Secretary General of the PD and was Minister of Agriculture, Forestry and Fisheries from 2007 to 2015 before becoming a deputy prime minister. Lucas da Costa was a Member of Parliament in East Timor from 2007 to 2012. António da Conceição has been Minister of Trade, Industry and Environment since 2012. RENETIL members also achieved leading positions in other parties.

== Members ==
=== Founding Members ===
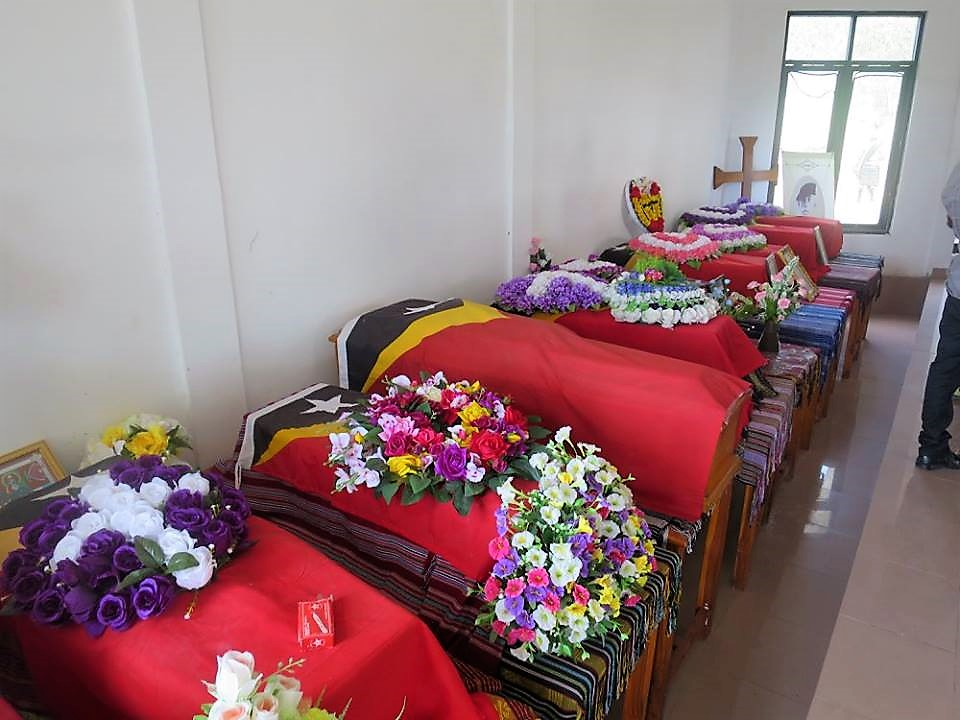
Funeral of martyrs of the RENETIL

Fernando de Araújo, Lucas da Costa (Rama Metan), José Ave Maria X. Gonçalves (Si'ak), Júlio Abel Ribeiro (Tae Tudak), Marciano Octavio Garcia da Silva (Sury Sakar Subar), João Araújo (Mau-Terus), Adolpho Fontes (Mau Lamas), João Cardoso Fernandes (Mau Riba), Carlos da Silva Lopes (Saky) und Agapito Cardoso (Mau-Laco).

=== Leadership ===
Fernando de Araújo was Secretary General from 1989 to 1999. He was succeeded by Miguel Manetelu.

After Araújo was arrested in 1991, José Antonio Neves took over. After his arrest, leadership passed to an eight-member executive committee. Its members were: Joaquim Fonseca, Virgilio da Silva, Benjamin Martins, Julio Jacob, Lucas da Costa, Adérito de Jesus Soares, José Pompeia and António da Conceição.

In 1996 the organization was divided into three regional groups: Indonesia, East Timor and the rest of the world. Joaquim Fonseca led the group Indonesia. His deputy was Mariano Sabino Lopes. António da Conceição led the group East Timor. The Overseas Group, based in Portugal, was headed by Carlos da Silva Lopes. Mariano Sabino Lopes was National Coordinator of IMPETU from 1996. The current Secretary-General is Joaquim da Fonseca.

=== Other former members ===
Several former members have been influential since East Timorese independence. They include

- Demetrio do Amaral de Carvalho, an environmental activist and Goldman Environmental Prize winner
- Rui Maria de Araújo, prime minister from 2015 to 2017 (Fretilin)
- Arsenio Bano, deputy leader of the FRETILIN party and member of the authority of the Oecusse District Special Administrative Region
- Eduardo de Carvalho (PD), former Secretary of State for Fisheries
- Arcangelo Leite (PD), former Minister of State Administration
- Lúcia Lobato, former Minister of Justice
- Aniceto Guterres Lopes, FRETILIN leader in Parliament
- Miguel Manetelu (CNRT), Deputy Minister of Social Solidarity
- Nelson Martins, former health minister
- Gertrudes Moniz Araújo, president of the PD Democratic Women's Organization and former member of parliament
- Jacinto Rigoberto (CNRT), former Secretary of State for Social Assistance and Natural Disasters and Deputy Minister of Social Solidarity
- Domingos Sarmento Alves (PD), Ambassador in Japan and the United States
