= Nélio Isaac Sarmento =

East Timorese politician

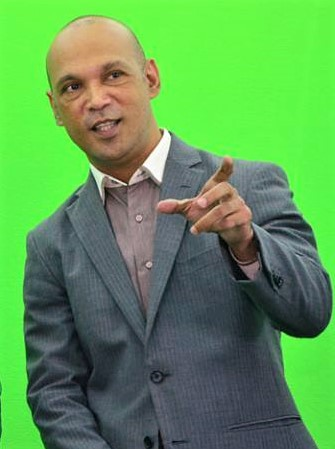
- Sarmento and a green screen in 2017

Minister of Youth, Sport, Art and Culture
- Incumbent
- Assumed office 1 July 2023
- Preceded by: Armindo Maia; (as Minister of Education, Youth and Sport); Longuinhos dos Santos; (as Minister of Higher Education, Science and Culture)

Secretary of State for Youth and Sport
- In office 22 June 2018 – 25 May 2020
- Prime Minister: Taur Matan Ruak
- Preceded by: Nívio Leite Magalhães; (as Secretary of State for Youth and Labour); Osório Florindo da Conceição Costa; (as Secretary of State for Sport and Promotion of Top-Level Sport)
- Succeeded by: Abrão Saldanha

Secretary of State for Social Communication
- In office 16 February 2015 – 15 September 2017
- Prime Minister: Rui Maria de Araújo
- Preceded by: Himself; (as Secretary of State for Media)
- Succeeded by: Office abolished

Secretary of State for Media
- In office 8 August 2012 – 16 February 2015
- Prime Minister: Xanana Gusmão
- Preceded by: Office created
- Succeeded by: Himself; (as Secretary of State for Social Communication)

Personal details
- Born: Nélio Isaac Sarmento
- Party: National Congress for Timorese Reconstruction (CNRT)

Nélio Isaac Sarmento is an East Timorese journalist and politician, and a member of the National Congress for Timorese Reconstruction (Portuguese: Congresso Nacional de Reconstrução de Timor, CNRT).

He is the incumbent Minister of Youth, Sport, Art and Culture, serving since July 2023 in the IX Constitutional Government of East Timor led by Prime Minister Xanana Gusmão.
