= Ágio Pereira =

East Timorese politician

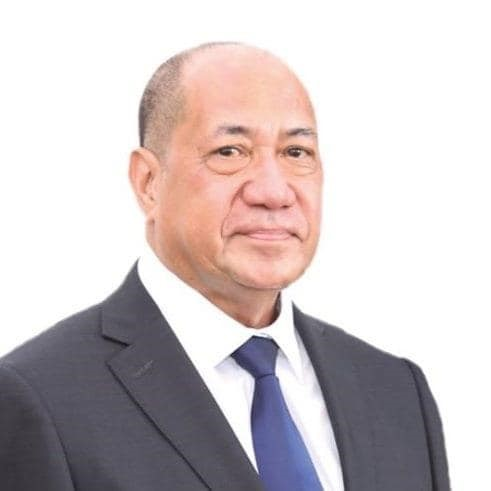

Minister of the Presidency of the Council of Ministers
- Incumbent
- Assumed office 1 July 2023
- Prime Minister: Xanana Gusmão
- Preceded by: Fidelis Leite Magalhães
- In office 22 June 2018 – 12 May 2020
- Prime Minister: Taur Matan Ruak
- Preceded by: Adriano do Nascimento
- Succeeded by: Office abolished

Deputy Minister of the Prime Minister for the Delimitation of Borders
- In office 3 October 2017 – 22 June 2018
- Prime Minister: Mari Alkatiri

Minister of State of the Presidency of the Council of Ministers
- In office 8 August 2012 – 15 September 2017
- Prime Minister: Xanana Gusmão; (to 16 February 2015); Rui Maria de Araújo; (from 16 February 2015)
- Succeeded by: Adriano do Nascimento

Secretary of State of the Council of Ministers
- In office 8 August 2007 – 8 August 2012
- Prime Minister: Xanana Gusmão
- Preceded by: Gregório de Sousa
- Succeeded by: Avelino Coelho

Personal details
- Born: 31 March 1956 (age 70): Portuguese Timor; (now East Timor)
- Party: National Congress for Timorese Reconstruction (CNRT)
- Spouses: Lurdes Pires; (1978–1988); Yeni do Rosário Lay Pereira; (2012–present)
- Children: One daughter Shana Pereira, Two sons

Hermenegildo Augusto "Ágio" Cabral Pereira Alves (also known as Ágio Pereira) (born 31 March 1956) is an East Timorese politician, and a member of the National Congress for Timorese Reconstruction (CNRT).

He is the incumbent Minister of the Presidency of the Council of Ministers, serving since July 2023 in the IX Constitutional Government of East Timor led by Prime Minister Xanana Gusmão.

In the VI Constitutional Government, Pereira was one of four Ministers of State, and also Minister of the Presidency of the Council of Ministers. In the VII Constitutional Government, he was Deputy Minister of the Prime Minister for the Delimitation of Borders. From June 2018 to May 2020, he was again Minister of State and Minister of the Council of Ministers, in the VIII Constitutional Government.

== Early life and career ==
Pereira was born in the then Portuguese Timor (now East Timor) on 31 March 1956. During the 24 years of the Indonesian occupation of East Timor (1975-1999), he lived initially in the Portuguese capital, Lisbon, where he studied music and worked as a civil servant. Later, Pereira emigrated to Australia where his first daughter Shana was born in 1980. From 1991 to 1999 he was executive director of the Australian-based international humanitarian organization East Timor Relief Association Incorporated Inc. (ETRA), which advocated the independence of East Timor and provided humanitarian aid.

In July 1999, Pereira returned to East Timor, one month before the independence referendum. In September 2000, upon the founding of the centre-right Social Democratic Party (PSD), Pereira became its Vice Chairman. Previously, he was a member of the leftist Fretilin party.

Between 1999 and 2001, Pereira was the PSD representative in the National Council of Timorese Resistance (CNRT), the umbrella organization of the East Timorese independence movement. From 1999 to 2000, he led the National Emergency Commission, which provided care to those who had been traumatised by violent militia attacks. From 2000 to 2001, he was a member of the National Consultative Council (NCC), which aimed to represent the population of East Timor in the UN administration. In that capacity, Pereira was appointed Deputy Spokesman, Chairman of the Standing Committee on Budget and Finance, and Vice-Chairman of the Standing Committee on Political Affairs.

== Political career ==
From 2002, Pereira was chief of staff to the then presidents Xanana Gusmão and José Ramos-Horta, respectively, until 8 August 2007, when he was sworn in as Secretary of State of the Council of Ministers and government spokesman in the IV Constitutional Government.

On 8 August 2012, upon the commencement of Prime Minister Gusmão's second term, as leader of the V Constitutional Government, Pereira was promoted to Minister of State of the Presidency of the Council of Ministers. After Gusmão resigned prematurely as Prime Minister and was replaced by Rui Maria de Araújo, Pereira continued as Minister of State of the Presidency of the Council of Ministers.

Following the parliamentary election in 2017, the CNRT went into opposition, and Pereira was replaced in his ministerial post by Adriano do Nascimento. However, on 29 September 2017 opposition members were included in the government, and Pereira was appointed Deputy Minister of the Prime Minister for the Delimitation of Borders. In the meantime, Pereira had risen to the position of party chairman of the CNRT. In 2018, there was an early parliamentary election and the CNRT returned to the governing coalition as the lead party in the three party Alliance for Change and Progress (AMP). In the new AMP coalition government, Pereira was again appointed Minister of State of the Presidency of the Council of Ministers.

On 12 May 2020, following the breakdown of the AMP coalition during the first few months of 2020, the Council of Ministers approved a restructure of the ministry that included the abolition of Pereira's portfolio of Minister of State. Pereira was therefore sidelined from the government with effect from that date.

On 1 July 2023, upon the commencement of Prime Minister Gusmão's third term in that office, as leader of the IX Constitutional Government, Pereira was re-appointed as Minister of the Presidency of the Council of Ministers.

== Personal ==
Pereira lives in the Dili district of Fatuhada. He is married to Yeni do Rosário Lay Pereira and they have two sons, born in 2013 and 2018, respectively.

He has training in environmental biology and a masters degree in criminology and criminal justice.

He also composed the music for the British film documentary "Death of a Nation: The Timor Conspiracy" (1994).
