= IX Constitutional Government of Timor-Leste =

East Timorese cabinet led by Xanana Gusmão

IX Constitutional Government
- IX Constitutional Government of Timor-Leste
- Incumbent
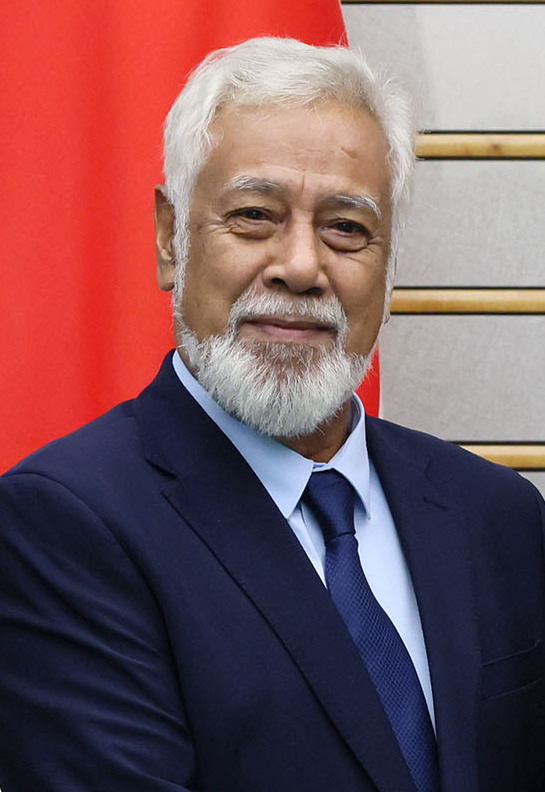
- Gusmão in 2023
- Date formed: 1 July 2023

People and organisations
- President: José Ramos-Horta
- Prime Minister: Xanana Gusmão
- No. of ministers: 1 Prime Minister; 2 Deputy Prime Ministers; 19 Ministers; 10 Deputy Ministers; 15 Secretaries of State
- Member parties: CNRT–PD
- Status in legislature: Majority

History
- Election: 2023
- Predecessor: VIII Constitutional Government

The IX Constitutional Government (Portuguese: IX Governo Constitucional, Tetum: IX Governu Konstitusionál) is the ninth and incumbent Constitutional Government (administration or cabinet) under the Constitution of Timor-Leste. It was formed on 1 July 2023, and is led by Prime Minister, Xanana Gusmão. It is his second term after 2007 to 2015

== Composition ==
The government is made up of Ministers, Deputy Ministers (Note: The Constitution of Timor-Leste provides, in sections 104 and 105, for the appointment of officials referred to in its English language version as "Deputy Ministers". In other English language publications, those officials are commonly referred to as "Vice Ministers", even though the word "Vice", in context, arguably has a different meaning in English from the word "Deputy". In this article, the constitutional expression "Deputy" is used.) and Secretaries of State, as follows:

=== Ministers ===
Party	Minister	Portrait	Portfolio
CNRT	Xanana Gusmão		Prime Minister; CNRT leader
CNRT	Francisco Kalbuadi Lay		Deputy Prime Minister; Coordinating Minister of Economic Affairs; Minister of Tourism and Environment
PD	Mariano "Assanami" Lopes		Deputy Prime Minister; Coordinating Minister of Rural Development Affairs; PD leader
CNRT	Ágio Pereira		Minister of the Presidency of the Council of Ministers
CNRT	Bendito Freitas		Minister of Foreign Affairs and Cooperation
CNRT	Santina Viegas Cardoso		Minister of Finance
Independent	Amândio Benevides		Minister of Justice (1 July 2023 – 20 January 2024)
Independent	Sérgio Hornai		Minister of Justice (15 February 2024 – present)
CNRT	Dulce de Jesus Soares		Minister of Education
CNRT	José Honório da Costa Pereira Jerónimo		Minister of Higher Education, Science and Culture (1 July 2023 – 21 April 2026)
CNRT	Tomás do Rosário Cabral		Minister of State Administration
CNRT	Élia António de Araújo dos Reis Amaral		Minister of Health
CNRT	Verónica das Dores		Minister of Social Solidarity and Inclusion
CNRT	Gil da Costa Monteiro "Oan Soru"		Minister of National Liberation Fighter Affairs
CNRT	Samuel Marçal		Minister of Public Works
CNRT	Miguel Marques Gonçalves Manetelu		Minister of Transport and Communications
PD	Filipus Nino Pereira		Minister of Commerce and Industry
CNRT	Marcos da Cruz		Minister of Agriculture, Livestock, Fisheries, and Forestry
Independent	Pedro Klamar Fuik		Minister of Defense
CNRT	Francisco da Costa Monteiro		Minister of Petroleum and Minerals
CNRT	Francisco da Costa Guterres		Minister of the Interior
CNRT	Nélio Isaac Sarmento		Minister of Youth, Sport, Art and Culture
PD	Gastão de Sousa		Minister of Strategic Investment

=== Deputy Ministers ===
Party	Deputy Minister	Portrait	Portfolio
CNRT	Adérito Hugo da Costa		Deputy Minister of Parliamentary Affairs
CNRT	Hélder Lopes		Deputy Minister of Finance (1 July 2023 – 13 September 2023)
CNRT	Felícia Carvalho		Deputy Minister of Finance (15 September 2023 – present)
CNRT	Milena Maria da Costa Rangel		Deputy Minister for ASEAN affairs
CNRT	Paulo dos Remédios		Deputy Minister for Institutional Empowerment
CNRT	José dos Reis Magno		Deputy Minister for Strengthening Health Institutions
	Júlio do Carmo		Deputy Minister of Infrastructure
CNRT	Jacinto Rigoberto Gomes de Deus		Deputy Minister of State Administration
PD	Augusto Junior Trindade		Deputy Minister of Commerce
Independent	Céu Brites		Deputy Minister of Social Solidarity and Inclusion
PD	Flávio Brandão		Deputy Minister of Hospital Operations

=== Secretaries of State ===
Party	Secretary of State	Portrait	Portfolio
PD	Elvina Sousa Carvalho		Secretary of State for Equality
Independent	Expedito Dias Ximenes		Secretary of State for Social Communications
CNRT	Jaime Xavier Lopes		Secretary of State for Land and Property
CNRT	Domingos Lopes Lemos		Secretary of State for High School and Technical Schools
	Santos Noronha		Secretary of State for Electricity, Water, and Sanitation
	Jorge Soares Cristóvão		Secretary of State for Arts and Culture
CNRT	Domingos dos Santos da Conceição		Secretary of State for Fisheries
	José Vieira de Araújo		Secretary of State for Livestock
PD	Ferdinando Vieira		Secretary of State for Forestry
CNRT	Arsénio Pereira da Silva		Secretary of State for Cooperatives
CNRT	Rogério Araújo Mendonça		Secretary of State for Vocational Training and Employment
	Mateus dos Santos Talo		Secretary of State for Rural Development
	Germano Santa Brites Dias		Secretary of State for Toponomy and State Urban Organizations
	Domingos Mariano Reis		Secretary of State for Civil Protection
	César Merak		Secretary of State for Veterans
