= ASEAN =

Intergovernmental forum of Southeast Asian nations

Association of
Southeast Asian Nations
(in other national languages)
Filipino	Samahan ng mga Bansa sa Timog-silangang Asya
Indonesian	Perhimpunan Bangsa-Bangsa Asia Tenggara (Note: "Malay" here refers to the Malaysian standard of the pluricentric Malay language used in Malaysia, Brunei and Singapore sister to Indonesian used in Indonesia, both formal registers of these varieties are mostly mutually intelligible but are treated separately here for geopolitical reasons.)
Khmer	សមាគមប្រជាជាតិអាស៊ីអាគ្នេយ៍
Lao	ສະມາຄົມປະຊາຊາດແຫ່ງອາຊີຕະເວັນອອກສຽງໃຕ້
Malay	Persatuan Negara-negara Asia Tenggara
Burmese	အရှေ့တောင်အာရှနိုင်ငံများအသင်း
Portuguese	Associação das Nações do Sudeste Asiático
Tamil	தென்கிழக்காசிய நாடுகளின் கூட்டமைப்பு
Tetun	Asosiasaun ba Nasaun Sudeste Aziátiku
Thai	สมาคมประชาชาติแห่งเอเชียตะวันออกเฉียงใต้
Vietnamese	Hiệp hội các quốc gia Đông Nam Á
Chinese	亞細安組織 東南亞國家聯盟 東南亞國家協會
- Flag Emblem
- Motto: "One Vision, One Identity, One Community"
- Anthem: "The ASEAN Way"
- Member states shown in dark green
- Headquarters: Jakarta, Indonesia
- Largest city: Jakarta
- Working language: English
- Demonym: Southeast Asian
- Type: Regional organisation
- Membership: 11 members; Brunei Darussalam; Cambodia; Indonesia; Laos; Malaysia; Myanmar; Philippines; Singapore; Thailand; Timor-Leste; Vietnam; 1 observer; Papua New Guinea
- Government: Consensus-driven on the principle of non-interference
  - Chairman: Bongbong Marcos
  - Secretary-General: Kao Kim Hourn

Formation
  - ASEAN Declaration: 8 August 1967
  - Free Trade Area: 1 January 1993
  - ASEAN Charter: 16 December 2008
  - QR Code Payment: c. 2020s

Area
  - Total: 4,522,518 km^{2} (1,746,154 sq mi)

Population
  - 2023 estimate: ▲683,290,000
  - Density: 144/km^{2} (373.0/sq mi)
- GDP (PPP): 2026 estimate
  - Total: ▲$14.403 trillion
  - Per capita: ▲$20,450
- GDP (nominal): 2026 estimate
  - Total: ▲$4.51 trillion
  - Per capita: ▲$6,410
- HDI (2024): ▲0.745 (Note: Calculated as a mean latest estimate from the UNDP data of member states. See also: List of ASEAN countries by HDI) high
- Currency: Brunei Darussalam: BND (B$); Cambodia: KHR (៛); Indonesia: IDR (Rp.); Laos: LAK (₭); Malaysia: MYR (RM); Myanmar: MMK (K); Philippines: PHP (₱); Singapore: SGD (S$); Thailand: THB (฿); Timor-Leste: USD (US$); Vietnam: VND (₫)
- Time zone: UTC+06:30 to +09:00
- Website asean.org

The Association of Southeast Asian Nations (ASEAN, /ˈæsiæn/) is an intergovernmental forum of all 11 states in Southeast Asia. ASEAN primarily focuses on Southeast Asian economic development, peaceful coexistence and adherence to international norms. ASEAN operates on the principle of consensus and respecting national sovereignty, meaning that ASEAN as a whole cannot force another member state to change its domestic laws.

ASEAN has a population of more than 680 million people and a purchasing power parity-adjusted gross domestic product (GDP) of around 6.3% global GDP. ASEAN member states represent a diverse set of economies: the least developed countries like Laos, to emerging economies like Vietnam, to developed economies like Singapore. Many Southeast Asian projects have originated from decentralised initiatives between member states, such as the ASEAN Power Grid, ASEAN Free Trade Area, ASEAN Integrated QR Code Payment System, or the mutual ASEAN visa-free policies.

ASEAN has strong ties with East Asian and South Asian countries. It has a vested interest in the security of the South China Sea and the greater Indo-Pacific region. In terms of diplomacy, ASEAN operates on a principle of centrality, meaning that all concerns from other countries or organisations about Southeast Asia should be routed to ASEAN instead of individual states. All Southeast Asian countries, many great powers, and international organisations have dedicated diplomatic presence near ASEAN headquarters in Jakarta.

The roots of ASEAN came from the ASEAN Declaration signed by five Southeast Asian countries in 1967. Originally, ASEAN was founded to contain communism, but gradually ASEAN was reoriented to focus on economic development and prevent foreign interference in Southeast Asia as a whole. As ASEAN expanded and admitted other countries, the member states eventually signed a binding ASEAN Charter in 2008. As of 2026, ASEAN are currently dealing with many threats, such as the worsening civil war in Myanmar, territorial disputes in the South China Sea and managing US–China tensions. Nevertheless, it is widely considered to be a successful example of regional collaboration, and its emphasis on de facto standards is seen as an opposite to the legal nature of the European Union.

== History ==
=== Background ===
Besides their close geographic proximity, political scholars consider Southeast Asian nations "cultural crossroads" between East Asia and South Asia, located at critical junctions of the South China Sea and the Indian Ocean, as well as a result received a great deal of Islamic and Persian influence prior to the European colonial ages.

Since around 100 BCE, the Southeast Asian archipelago occupied a central position at the crossroads of the Indian Ocean and the South China Sea trading routes, which stimulated the economy and the influx of ideas. This included the introduction of abugida scripts to Southeast Asia as well as the Chinese script to Vietnam. Besides various indigenous scripts, various abugida Brahmic scripts were widespread in both continental and insular Southeast Asia. Historically, scripts such as Pallava, Kawi (from ancient Sanskrit script) and Rencong or Surat Ulu were used to write Old Malay, until they were replaced by Jawi during Islamic missionary missions in the Malay Archipelago.

European colonialism influenced most ASEAN countries, including French Indochina (present-day Vietnam, Laos and Cambodia), British Burma, Malaya and Borneo (present-day Myanmar, Malaysia and Singapore, and Brunei), Dutch East Indies (present day Indonesia), Spanish East Indies (present-day Philippines and various other colonies), and Portuguese Timor (present-day Timor-Leste), with only Thailand (then Siam) not formed from a prior European colony. Siam served as the buffer state, sandwiched between British Burma and French Indochina, but its kings had to contend with unequal treaties as well as British and French political interference and territorial losses after the Franco-Siamese conflict of 1893 and the Anglo-Siamese Treaty of 1909. Under European colonisation, Southeast Asian nations were introduced to European religions and technologies, as well as the Latin alphabet.

The Empire of Japan, in the vein of the Greater East Asia Co-Prosperity Sphere concept, sought to unite and create a pan-Asian identity against Western colonial occupation, but Japan's alliance with the Axis powers in World War II soured relations between many colonies of Europe and the United States. Defeat of Imperial Japan eventuated in decolonisation movements throughout Southeast Asia, resulting in the independent ASEAN states seen today.

=== Formation ===
A newsreel documenting the signing ceremony of the ASEAN Declaration on 8 August 1967 (ASEAN Day)

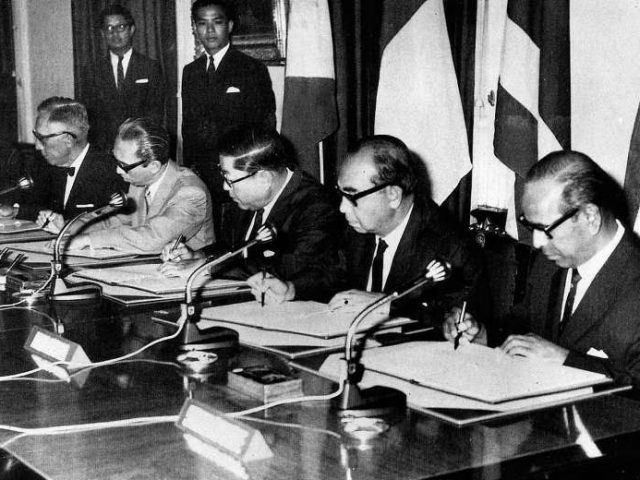
Signing of the ASEAN Declaration by the five Foreign Ministers at Saranrom Palace in Bangkok

The predecessor of ASEAN was the Association of Southeast Asia (ASA), formed on 31 July 1961 and consisting of Thailand, the Philippines, and Malaya. ASEAN itself was created on 8 August 1967, when the foreign ministers of five countries - Indonesia, Malaysia, the Philippines, Singapore, and Thailand – signed the ASEAN Declaration at Saranrom Palace in Bangkok, negotiated in Lam Thaen Guest House. According to the Declaration, ASEAN aims to accelerate economic, social, and cultural development in the region, as well as promoting regional peace, to collaborate on matters of shared interest, and to promote Southeast Asian studies and maintain close cooperation with existing international organisations.

The creation of ASEAN was initially motivated by the desire to contain communism, which took a foothold in mainland Asia after World War II, with the formation of communist governments in North Korea, China, and North Vietnam, accompanied by the so-called communist "emergency" in British Malaya, and unrest in the recently decolonised Philippines.

These events also encouraged the earlier formation of the South East Asia Treaty Organization (SEATO), led by the United States, United Kingdom, and Australia, with several Southeast Asian partners in 1954 as an extension of "containment" policy, seeking to create an Eastern version of NATO. However, the local member states of ASEAN group achieved greater cohesion in the mid-1970s following a change in the balance of power after the Fall of Saigon and the end of the Vietnam War in April 1975 and the decline of SEATO.

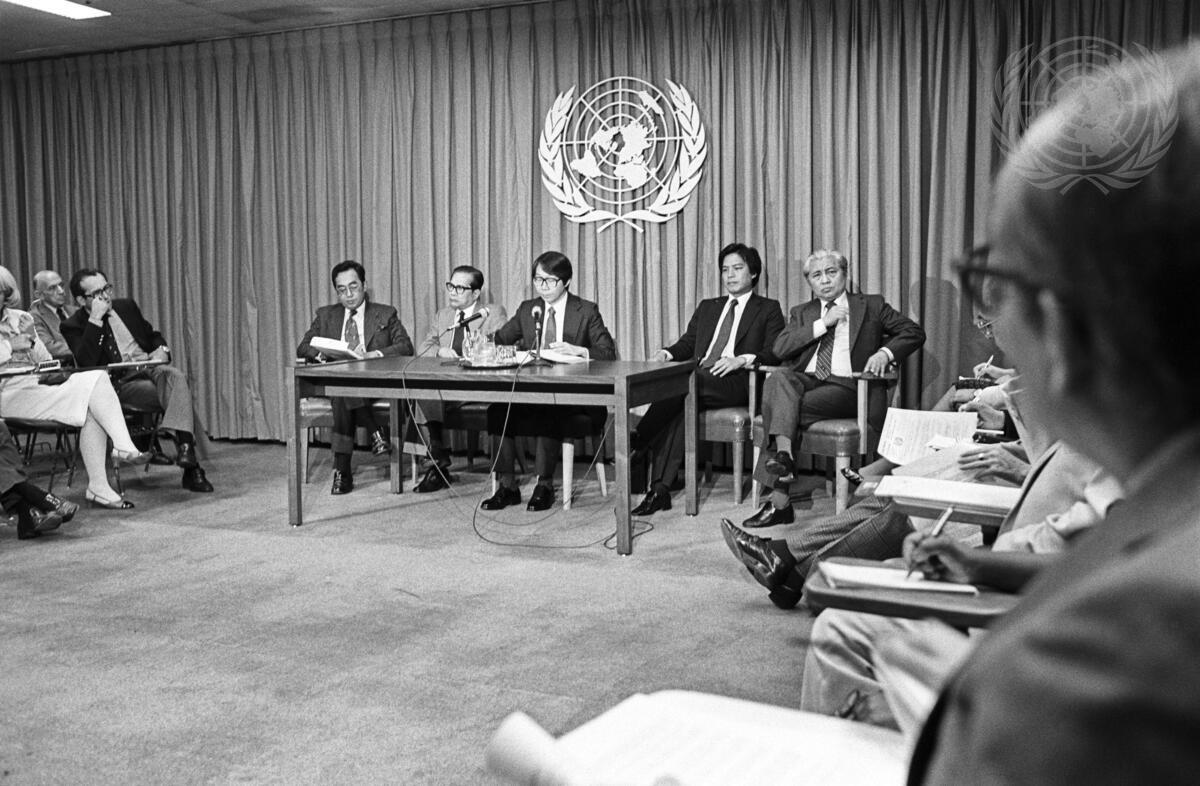
Singapore's Tommy Koh (middle) leads the ASEAN Coalition at a UN press conference during the Cambodian–Vietnamese War, 20 July 1981.

ASEAN's first summit meeting, held in Bali, Indonesia, in 1976, resulted in an agreement on several industrial projects and the signing of a Treaty of Amity and Cooperation, and a Declaration of Concord. The end of the Cold War allowed ASEAN countries to exercise greater political independence in the region, and in the 1990s, ASEAN emerged as a leading voice on regional trade and security issues.

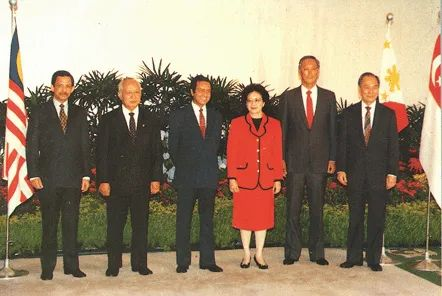
Members pose after the Signing of the ASEAN Free Trade Area (AFTA) in Singapore, 28 January 1992

On 15 December 1995, the Southeast Asian Nuclear-Weapon-Free Zone Treaty was signed to turn Southeast Asia into a nuclear-weapon-free zone. The treaty took effect on 28 March 1997 after all but one of the member states had ratified it. It became fully effective on 21 June 2001 after the Philippines ratified it, effectively banning all nuclear weapons in the region.

=== Expansion ===
Video: ASEAN explained in 5 minutes

On 7 January 1984, Brunei became ASEAN's sixth member and on 28 July 1995, following the end of the Cold War, Vietnam joined as the seventh member. Laos and Myanmar (formerly Burma) joined two years later on 23 July 1997. Cambodia was to join at the same time as Laos and Myanmar, but a Cambodian coup in 1997 and other internal instability delayed its entry. It then joined on 30 April 1999 following the stabilisation of its government. Timor-Leste joined ASEAN on 26 October 2025 during the 47th ASEAN Summit as its 11th member, it is the latest country to join this association, completing a two-decade accession process.

In 2006, ASEAN was given observer status at the United Nations General Assembly. In response, the organisation awarded the status of "dialogue partner" to the UN. The UK and ASEAN have also pursued a dialogue partnership.

=== The ASEAN Charter ===
On 15 December 2008, the member states met in Jakarta to launch the charter signed in November 2007, to move closer to "an EU-style community". The charter formally established ASEAN as a legal entity, aiming to create a single trade bloc for a region encompassing 500 million people. Indonesian president Susilo Bambang Yudhoyono stated: "This is a momentous development when ASEAN is consolidating, integrating, and transforming itself into a community. It is achieved while ASEAN seeks a more vigorous role in Asian and global affairs at a time when the international system is experiencing a seismic shift". Referring to climate change and economic upheaval, he concluded: "Southeast Asia is no longer the bitterly divided, war-torn region it was in the 1960s and 1970s".

The 2008 financial crisis was seen as a threat to the charter's goals, and also set forth the idea of a proposed human rights body to be discussed at a future summit in February 2009. This proposition caused controversy, although the body would not have the power to impose sanctions or punish countries which violated citizens' rights and would, therefore, be limited in effectiveness. The body was established later in 2009 as the ASEAN Intergovernmental Commission on Human Rights (AICHR).

In November 2012, the commission adopted the ASEAN Human Rights Declaration. However, their human rights declaration has been critiqued widely by the international community, with the United Nations High Commissioner for Human Rights stating that the declaration was worded in problematic ways that do not easily align with international norms. Likewise, the Human Rights Watch in the United States of America noted several important fundamental rights were omitted or not clearly established.

The chairmanship of ASEAN rotates among the member states. The Philippines holds the position for 2026. Recent ASEAN chairs are as follows:

ASEAN Chairs
Year	Country	Year	Country	Year	Country
2008	Thailand	2016	Laos	2024	Laos
2009	Thailand	2017	Philippines	2025	Malaysia
2010	Vietnam	2018	Singapore	2026	Philippines
2011	Indonesia	2019	Thailand	2027	Singapore
2012	Cambodia	2020	Vietnam	2028	Thailand
2013	Brunei	2021	Brunei	2029	Timor-Leste
2014	Myanmar	2022	Cambodia	2030	Vietnam
2015	Malaysia	2023	Indonesia		

=== Public health ===
In response to pandemics, ASEAN has coordinated with ASEAN+3 and other actors to create a regional public health response.

==== SARS outbreak ====
During the 2002–2004 SARS outbreak, ASEAN and ASEAN+3 worked together to devise a response to the outbreak. Immediate and short-to-medium term measures were devised. The parties agreed to enhance sharing of best practices against the disease while also agreeing to bolster collaboration between their respective health authorities and harmonise travel procedures to ensure that proper health screening would occur. In addition, China offered to contribute $1.2 million to the ASEAN SARS fund, made both to show that it was willing to cooperate with the rest of the region and make amends for its withholding of information during the initial stages of the outbreak.

==== H1N1 Pandemic ====
ASEAN held a special meeting between ASEAN and ASEAN+3 health ministers on 8 May 2009, on responding to the H1N1 pandemic. At this meeting, it was agreed that hotlines would be established between public health authorities, joint response teams would be formed, and ongoing research efforts would be bolstered.

=== Myanmar crisis ===
Since 2017, political, military and ethnic affairs in Myanmar have posed unusual challenges for ASEAN, creating precedent-breaking situations and threatening the traditions and unity of the group, and its global standing – with ASEAN responses indicating possible fundamental change in the nature of the organisation.

==== Rohingya genocide ====
The Rohingya genocide erupting in Myanmar in August 2017 – killing thousands of Rohingya people in Myanmar, driving most into neighbouring Bangladesh, and continuing for months – created a global outcry demanding ASEAN take action against the civilian-military coalition government of Myanmar, which had long discriminated against the Rohingya, and had launched the 2017 attacks upon them.

==== 2021 Myanmar coup ====
On 1 February 2021, the day before a newly elected slate of civilian leaders was to take office in Myanmar, a military junta overthrew Myanmar's civilian government in a coup d'etat, declaring a national state of emergency, imposing martial law, arresting elected civilian leaders, violently clamping down on dissent, and replacing civilian government with the military's appointees. Widespread protests and resistance erupted, and elements of the civilian leadership formed an underground "National Unity Government" (NUG). Global opposition to the coup emerged, and global pressure was brought on ASEAN to take action.

==== 2026 first summit inclusion of Timor-Leste and US-Iran War ====
The 2026 ASEAN summit held in the Philippines, Timor-Leste's Roman Catholic ally, was the first ASEAN summit wherein Timor-Leste participated as a full member of ASEAN. This occurred simultaneously with the chairmanship of António Guterres who is the reigning Secretary-General of the United Nations and holds Portuguese and Timorese citizenship. Topics discussed in the summit include; socio-economic issues, transportation, utilities, geopolitics, and resilience against crises, and others.

== Member states ==
Map showing the member states of ASEAN

A clickable Euler diagram showing the relationships between various Asian regional organizations

=== List of member states ===
State	Accession
Brunei Darussalam	January 7, 1984
Cambodia	April 30, 1999
Indonesia	August 8, 1967
Laos	July 23, 1997
Malaysia	August 8, 1967
Myanmar	July 23, 1997
Philippines	August 8, 1967
Singapore	August 8, 1967
Thailand	August 8, 1967
Timor-Leste	October 26, 2025
Vietnam	July 28, 1995

=== Observer states ===
There is currently one state seeking accession to ASEAN: Papua New Guinea.

- Accession of Papua New Guinea to ASEAN (observer status since 1976)

There are two states seeking for observer status in ASEAN; Fiji and Bangladesh.

- Accession of Fiji to ASEAN.
- Accession of Bangladesh to ASEAN (attempting to gain observer status, with the goal towards full membership.)

There was also one state that had formally pursued accession to ASEAN but later stopped, which was Sri Lanka.

- Accession of Sri Lanka to ASEAN (invited as one of the founders of ASEAN; 1981 accession attempt; both rejected by Singapore)

=== Dialogue partners ===
- Australia, Canada, China, European Union, India, Japan, New Zealand, Russia, South Korea, Turkey, United Kingdom and United States.

=== Sectoral Dialogue partners ===
- Brazil, Denmark, Germany, Morocco, Norway, Pakistan, South Africa, Switzerland, Qatar and United Arab Emirates.

=== Development partners ===
- Chile, France, Italy, Netherlands and Peru.

== The ASEAN Way ==
The ASEAN Way refers to a methodology or approach to solving issues that respect Southeast Asia's cultural norms. Masilamani and Peterson summarise it as:

A working process or style that is informal and personal. Policymakers constantly use compromise, consensus, and consultation in the informal decision-making process... it above all prioritises a consensus-based, non-conflictual way of addressing problems. Quiet diplomacy allows ASEAN leaders to communicate without bringing the discussions into the public view. Members avoid the embarrassment that may lead to further conflict.

It has been said that the merits of the ASEAN Way might "be usefully applied to global conflict management". However, critics have argued that such an approach can be only applied to Asian countries, to specific cultural norms and understandings notably, due to a difference in mindset and level of tension. Critics object, claiming that the ASEAN Way's emphasis on consultation, consensus, and non-interference forces the organisation to adopt only those policies which satisfy the lowest common denominator. Decision-making by consensus requires members to see eye-to-eye before ASEAN can move forward on an issue. Members may not have a common conception of the meaning of the ASEAN Way. Myanmar, Cambodia, and Laos emphasise non-interference while older member countries focus on co-operation and co-ordination. These differences hinder efforts to find common solutions to particular issues, but also make it difficult to determine when collective action is appropriate in a given situation.

== Structure ==
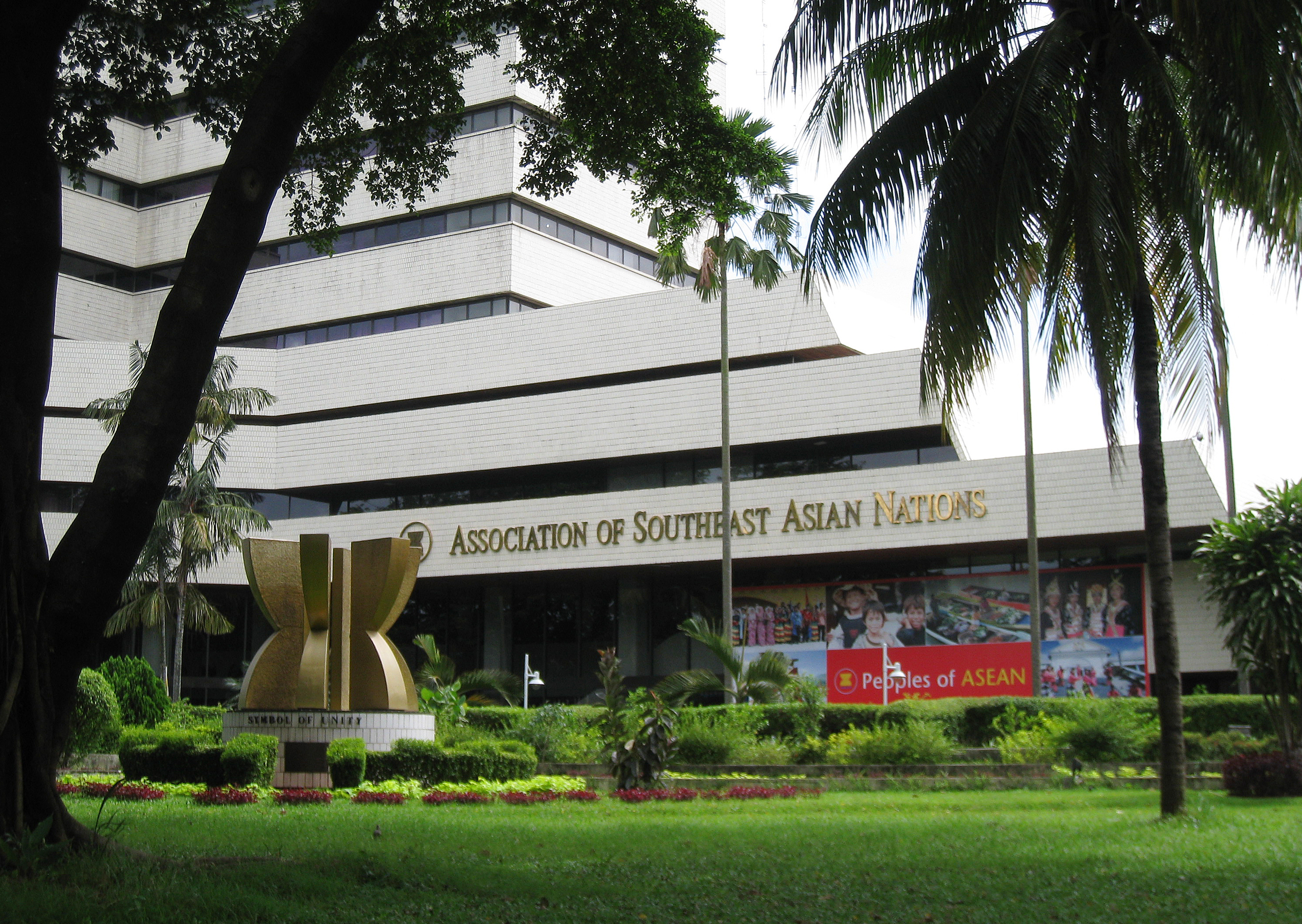
The ASEAN Headquarters in South Jakarta, Indonesia.

Beginning in 1997, heads of each member state adopted the ASEAN Vision 2020 during the group's 30th anniversary meeting held in Kuala Lumpur. As a means for the realisation of a single ASEAN community, this vision provides provisions on peace and stability, a nuclear-free region, closer economic integration, human development, sustainable development, cultural heritage, being a drug-free region, environment among others. The vision also aimed to "see an outward-looking ASEAN playing a pivotal role in the international fora, and advancing ASEAN's common interests".

ASEAN Vision 2020 was formalised and made comprehensive through the Bali Concord II in 2003.

Three major pillars of a single ASEAN community were established:

- Political-Security Community (APSC)
- Economic Community (AEC)
- Socio-Cultural Community (ASCC)

To fully embody the three pillars as part of the 2015 integration, blueprints for APSC and ASCC were subsequently adopted in 2009 in Cha-am, Thailand. The ASEAN Community, initially planned to commence by 2020, was accelerated to begin by 31 December 2015. It was decided during the 12th ASEAN Summit in Cebu in 2007.

At the 23rd ASEAN Summit in November 2013, leaders decided to develop a post-2015 Vision and created the High-Level Task Force (HLTF) that consists of ten high-level representatives from all member states. The Vision was adopted at the 27th Summit in November 2015 in Kuala Lumpur. The ASEAN community would revise and renew its vision every ten years to provide a framework for continuous development and further integration.

The terms in the post-2015 Vision are divided into four subcategories, namely APSC, AEC, ASCC, and Moving Forward. APSC issues are covered under articles 7 and 8. The former generally states the community's overall aspiration to aim for a united, inclusive and resilient community. It also puts human and environmental security as crucial points. Deepening engagement with both internal and external parties are also stressed to contribute to international peace, security and stability. The "Moving Forward" subcategory implies the acknowledgement of weaknesses of the institution's capacity to process and coordinate ASEAN work. Strengthening ASEAN Secretariat and other ASEAN organs and bodies is therefore desired. There is also a call for a higher level of ASEAN institutional presence at the national, regional and international levels.

Additionally, ASEAN institutional weakness has been further amplified by the ineffectiveness of its initiatives in fighting against COVID-19. ASEAN has been making painstaking efforts to combat the pandemic by establishing both intra and extra-regional ad hoc agencies such as theASEAN-China Ad-Hoc Health Ministers Joint Task Force, the Special ASEAN Summit on the COVID-19, COVID-19 ASEAN Response Fund, and the Special ASEAN Plus Three Summit on COVID-19. These mechanisms aim to facilitate senior discussions among regional actors on how to contain the pandemic's spread and reduce its negative impacts. However, their practical implementations are still insignificant when the cooperation among member states is insubstantial, as illustrated by the polarisation of their COVID-19 policies and the high number of cases and deaths in the region.

=== APSC Blueprint ===
During the 14th ASEAN Summit, the group adopted the APSC Blueprint. This document is aimed at creating a robust political-security environment within ASEAN, with programs and activities outlined to establish the APSC by 2016. It is based on the ASEAN Charter, the ASEAN Security Community Plan of Action, and the Vientiane Action Program. The APSC aims to create a sense of responsibility toward comprehensive security and a dynamic, outward-looking region in an increasingly integrated and interdependent world.

The ASEAN Defense Industry Collaboration (ADIC) was proposed at the 4th ASEAN Defense Ministers' Meeting (ADMM) on 11 May 2010 in Hanoi. Its purpose, among others, is to reduce defence imports from non-ASEAN countries by half and to further develop the defence industry in the region. It was formally adopted on the next ADMM on 19 May 2011, in Jakarta, Indonesia. The main focus is to industrially and technologically boost the security capability of ASEAN, consistent with the principles of flexibility and non-binding and voluntary participation among the member states. The concept revolves around education and capability-building programs to develop the skills and capabilities of the workforce, production of capital for defence products, and the provision of numerous services to address the security needs of each member state. It also aims to develop an intra-ASEAN defence trade. ADIC aims to establish a strong defence industry relying on the local capabilities of each member state and limit annual procurement from external original equipment manufacturers (OEMs). Countries like the US, Germany, Russia, France, Italy, UK, China, South Korea, Israel, and the Netherlands are among the major suppliers to ASEAN. ASEAN defence budget rose by 147% from 2004 to 2013 and is expected to rise further in the future. Factors affecting the increase include economic growth, ageing equipment, and the plan to strengthen the establishment of the defence industry. ASEANAPOL is also established to enhance cooperation on law enforcement and crime control among police forces of member states.

=== AEC Blueprint ===
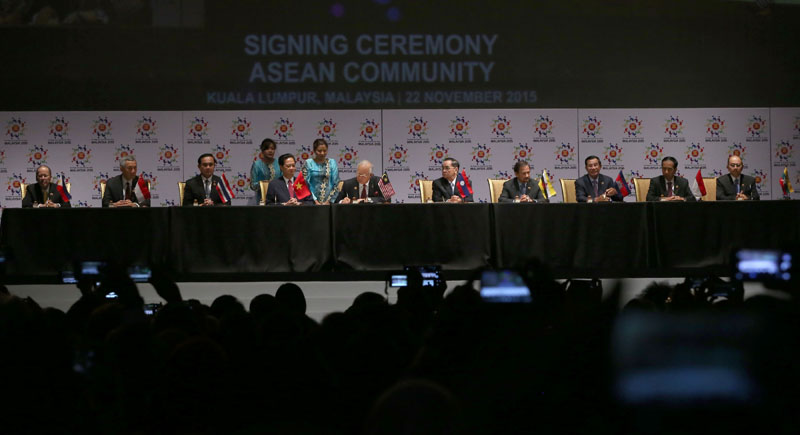
ASEAN leaders sign the declaration of the ASEAN Economic Community during the 27th ASEAN Summit in Kuala Lumpur, 2015.

The AEC aims to "implement economic integration initiatives" to create a single market for member states. The blueprint that serves as a comprehensive guide for the establishment of the community was adopted on 20 November 2007 at the 13th ASEAN Summit in Singapore. Its characteristics include a single market and production base, a highly competitive economic region, a region of fair economic development, and a region fully integrated into the global economy. The areas of cooperation include human resources development, recognition of professional qualifications, closer consultation economic policies, enhanced infrastructure and communications connectivity, integrating industries for regional sourcing, and strengthening private sector involvement. Through the free movement of skilled labour, goods, services and investment, ASEAN would rise globally as one market, thus increasing its competitiveness and opportunities for development.

To track the progress of the AEC, a compliance tool called the AEC Scorecard was developed based on the EU Internal Market Scorecard. It is the only one in effect and is expected to serve as an unbiased assessment tool to measure the extent of integration and the economic health of the region. It is expected to provide relevant information about regional priorities, and thus foster productive, inclusive, and sustainable growth. It makes it possible to monitor the implementation of ASEAN agreements, and the achievement of milestones indicated in the AEC Strategic Schedule. The scorecard outlines specific actions that must be undertaken collectively and individually to establish AEC by 2015. To date, two official scorecards have been published, one in 2010, and the other in 2012. However, the scorecard is purely quantitative, as it only examines whether a member state has performed the AEC task or not. The more "yes" answers, the higher the score.

While Brunei, Indonesia, Malaysia, the Philippines, Singapore, and Thailand have eliminated 99.65% of their tariff lines, Cambodia, Laos, Myanmar, and Vietnam have decreased tariffs on 98.86% of their lines to the 0-5% tariff range in 2010, and are projected to eliminate tariffs on these goods by 2015, with the ability to do so for a few import duty lines until 2018. A recent study by Deloitte Touche Tohmatsu Limited has projected that five of the top fifteen manufacturing locations in the world will be in ASEAN by 2018. Furthermore, by 2050, ASEAN is expected to be the fourth-largest economy in the world (after the European Union, the US, and China).

The AEC envisions the free flow of overseas labour. However, receiving countries may require would-be workers to take licensing examinations in those countries regardless of whether or not the worker has a professional licence from their home country. Singapore is a major destination for skilled migrants from other ASEAN countries, mostly from Malaysia and the Philippines. Total employment there doubled between 1992 and 2008 from 1.5 million to three million, and the number of foreign workers almost tripled, from fewer than 400,000 to nearly 1.1 million. High-skilled foreign talents (customer service, nursing, engineering, IT) earn at least several thousand US dollars a month and with a credential (usually a college degree) receive employment passes. In recent years, Singapore has been slowly cutting down the number of foreign workers to challenge companies to upgrade their hiring criteria and offer more jobs to local residents.

Narrowing the Development Gap (NDG) is the framework for addressing disparities among, and within, member states where pockets of underdevelopment exist. Under NDG, ASEAN has continued to coordinate closely with other sub-regional cooperation frameworks (e.g., BIMP-EAGA, IMT-GT, GMS, Mekong programs), viewing them as "equal partners in the development of regional production and distribution networks" in the AEC, and as a platform to "mainstream social development issues in developing and implementing projects" in the context of the ASCC.

The six-year Initiative for ASEAN Integration (IAI) Work Plans have been developed to assist Cambodia, Laos, Myanmar, Vietnam, as well as other sub-regions to ensure quick growth. The First IAI Work Plan was implemented from 2002 to 2008. The second plan (2009–2015) supports the goals of the ASEAN Community and is composed of 182 prescribed actions, which include studies, training programs, and policy implementation support, conducted through projects supported by older ASEAN member states, and ASEAN's Dialogue partners and external parties. The IAI Work Plan is patterned after and supports the key program areas in the three ASEAN Community Blueprints: ASPC, AEC, and ASCC. The IAI Task Force, composed of representatives of the Committee of Permanent Representatives and its working group from all member states, is in charge of providing general advice and policy guidelines and directions in the design and implementation of the plan. All member states are represented in the IAI Task Force, chaired by representatives of Cambodia, Laos, Myanmar, Vietnam. The ASEAN Secretariat, in particular through the IAI and NDG Division, supports the implementation and management of the IAI Work Plan and coordinates activities related to sub-regional frameworks. The division works closely with the Dialogue Partners, and international agencies, to develop strategies and programs to assist in promoting and implementing IAI and NDG activities in ASEAN.

ASEAN's planned integration has challenged its citizens to embrace a regional identity. It delivers a challenge to construct dynamic institutions and foster sufficient amount of social capital. The underlying assumption is that the creation of a regional identity is of special interest to ASEAN and the intent of the 2020 Vision policy document was to reassert the belief in a regional framework designed as an action plan related to human development and civic empowerment. Accordingly, these assumptions will be the basis for recommendations and strategies in developing a participatory regional identity.

==== APAEC blueprint ====
Part of the work towards the ASEAN Economic Community is the integration of the energy systems of the ASEAN member states. The blueprint for this integration is provided by the ASEAN Plan of Action for Energy Cooperation (APAEC). APAEC is managed by the ASEAN Center for Energy. The realisation of the ASEAN Power Grid (APG) is an important part of APAEC and ASEAN energy cooperation more broadly.

==== 2020 ASEAN Banking Integration Framework ====
As trade is liberalised with the integration in 2015, the need arises for ASEAN banking institutions to accommodate and expand their services to an intra-ASEAN market. Experts, however, have already forecast a shaky economic transition, especially for smaller players in the banking and financial services industry. Two separate reports by Standard & Poor's (S&P) outline the challenges that ASEAN financial institutions face as they prepare for the 2020 banking integration. (Note: ASEAN Financial Integration: The Long Road to Bank Consolidation and The Philippines' Banking System: The Good, the Bad and the Ambivalent.) The reports point out that overcrowded banking sector in the Philippines is expected to feel the most pressure as the integration welcomes tighter competition with bigger and more established foreign banks. As a result, there needs to be a regional expansion by countries with a small banking sector to lessen the impact of the post-integration environment. In a follow-up report, S&P recently cited the Philippines for "shoring up its network bases and building up capital ahead of the banking integration – playing defense and strengthening their domestic networks".

== Financial integration roadmap ==
The roadmap for financial integration is the latest regional initiative that aims to strengthen local self-help and support mechanisms. The roadmap's implementation would contribute to the realisation of the AEC. Adoption of a common currency, when conditions are ripe, could be the final stage of the AEC. The roadmap identifies approaches and milestones in capital market development, capital account and financial services liberalisation, and ASEAN currency cooperation. Capital market development entails promoting institutional capacity as well as the facilitation of greater cross-border collaboration, linkages, and harmonisation between capital markets. Orderly capital account liberalisation would be promoted with adequate safeguards against volatility and systemic risks. To expedite the process of financial services liberalisation, ASEAN has agreed on a positive list modality and adopted milestones to facilitate negotiations. Currency cooperation would involve the exploration of possible currency arrangements, including an ASEAN currency payment system for trade in local goods to reduce the demand for US dollars and to help promote stability of regional currencies, such as by settling intra-ASEAN trade using regional currencies.

In regards to a common currency, ASEAN leaders agreed in November 1999 to create the establishment of currency swaps and repurchase agreements as a credit line against future financial shocks. In May 2000, ASEAN finance ministers agreed to plan for closer cooperation through the Chiang Mai Initiative (CMI). The CMI has two components, an expanded ASEAN Swap Arrangement (ASA), and a network of bilateral swap arrangements among the ASEAN Plus Three. The ASA preceded the 1997 Asian financial crisis and was originally established by the monetary authorities of the five founding member states to help meet temporary liquidity problems. The ASA now includes all ten member states with an expanded facility of US$1 billion. In recognition of the economic interdependence of East Asia, which has combined foreign exchange reserves amounting to about US$1 trillion, a network of bilateral swap arrangements and repurchase agreements among the ASEAN Plus Three has been agreed upon. The supplementary facility aims to provide temporary financing for member states with balance-of-payments difficulties. In 2009, 16 bilateral swap arrangements (BSAs) were concluded with a combined amount of about US$35.5 billion. The CMI was signed on 9 December 2009 and took effect on 20 March 2014 while the amended version, the multilateralisation of CMI (CMIM), was on 17 July 2014. The CMIM is a multilateral currency swap arrangement governed by a single contractual agreement. In addition, an independent regional surveillance unit called the ASEAN+3 Macroeconomic and Research Office (AMRO) was established to monitor and analyse economies and to support the CMIM decision-making process. The amendments would allow access for the auction of a crisis prevention facility. These amendments are expected to fortify CMIM as the region's financial safety net in the event of any potential or actual liquidity difficulty.

During peacetime, the AMRO would conduct annual consultations with individual member economies and prepare quarterly-consolidated reports on the macroeconomic assessment of the ASEAN+3 region and individual member countries. In a time of crisis, the AMRO would prepare recommendations on any swap request based on macroeconomic analysis of a member state and monitor the use and impact of funds once an application is approved. AMRO was officially incorporated as a company limited by guarantee in Singapore on 20 April 2011. Governance of AMRO is being exercised by the executive committee (EC) and its operational direction by the Advisory Panel (AP). AMRO is currently headed by Dr Yoichi Nemoto of Japan, who is serving his second two-year term until 26 May 2016.

=== Food security ===
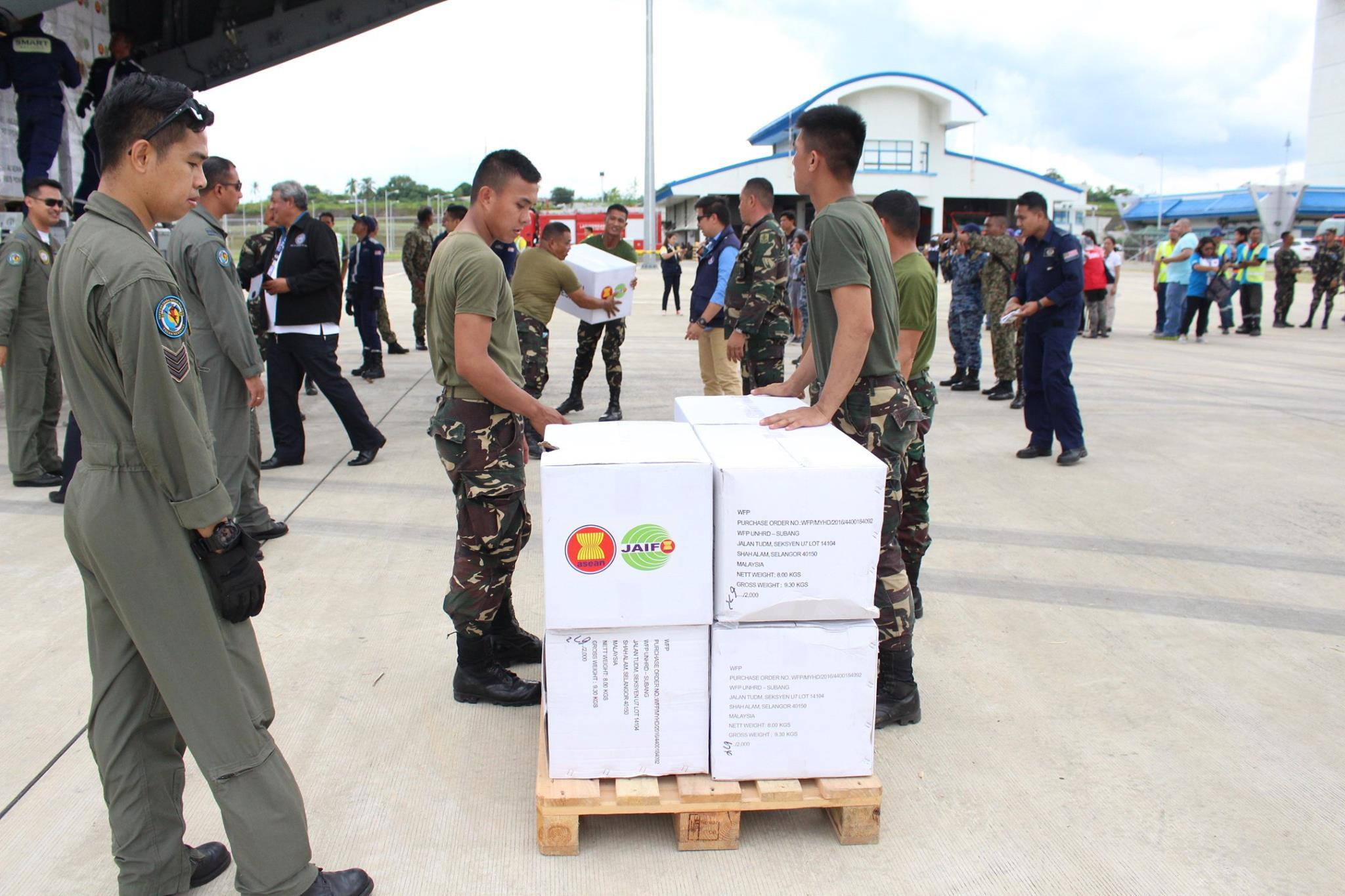
ASEAN aid during the Marawi crisis. Member states are obligated to help one another under the "One ASEAN, One Response" system

Member states recognise the importance of strengthening food security to maintain stability and prosperity in the region. As ASEAN moves towards AEC and beyond, food security would be an integral part of the community-building agenda. Strengthened food security is even more relevant in light of potentially severe risks from climate change with agriculture and fisheries being the most affected industries.

Part of the aim of ASEAN integration is to achieve food security collectively via trade in rice and maize. Trade facilitation measures and the harmonisation/equivalency of food regulation and control standards would reduce the cost of trade in food products. While specialisation and revealed comparative and competitive indices point to complementarities between trade patterns among the member states, intra-ASEAN trade in agriculture is quite small, something that integration could address. The MARKET project would provide flexible and demand-driven support to the ASEAN Secretariat while bringing more private-sector and civil-society input into regional agriculture policy dialogue. By building an environment that reduces barriers to trade, ASEAN trade would increase, thereby decreasing the risk of food price crisis.

=== ASCC Blueprint ===
The ASEAN Socio-Cultural Community (ASCC) was also adopted during the 14th ASEAN Summit. It envisions an "ASEAN Community that is people-centered and socially responsible with a view to achieving enduring solidarity and unity among the countries and peoples of ASEAN by forging a common identity and building a caring and sharing society which is inclusive and harmonious where the well-being, livelihood, and welfare of the peoples are enhanced". Its focus areas include human development, social welfare and protection, social justice and rights, environmental sustainability, building the ASEAN identity, and narrowing the development gap.

== Economy ==
GDP statistics by country, in 2026
Country	Population (millions)	GDP (nominal) 2026		GDP (PPP) 2026	
Country	Population (millions)	billions of USD	per capita USD	billions of Int$	per capita Int$
Indonesia	285.721	1,539.87	5,362	5,449.14	18,973
Singapore	5.871	659.57	107,758	1,063.24	173,708
Thailand	71.162	579.99	8,105	1,963.65	27,441
Philippines	116.786	512.22	4,443	1,572.56	13,639
Vietnam	101.598	527.26	5,115	2,025.33	19,649
Malaysia	35.977	516.43	15,085	1,608.50	46,986
Myanmar	54.850	83.83	1,519	293.31	5,315
Cambodia	17.847	52.38	2,902	160.48	8,890
Laos	7.873	18.96	2,403	86.49	10,964
Brunei	0.466	16.86	36,288	45.47	97,858
Timor-Leste	1.418	2.17	1,520	7.52	5,270
ASEAN	704.755	4,509.72	6,398	14,275.36	20,258

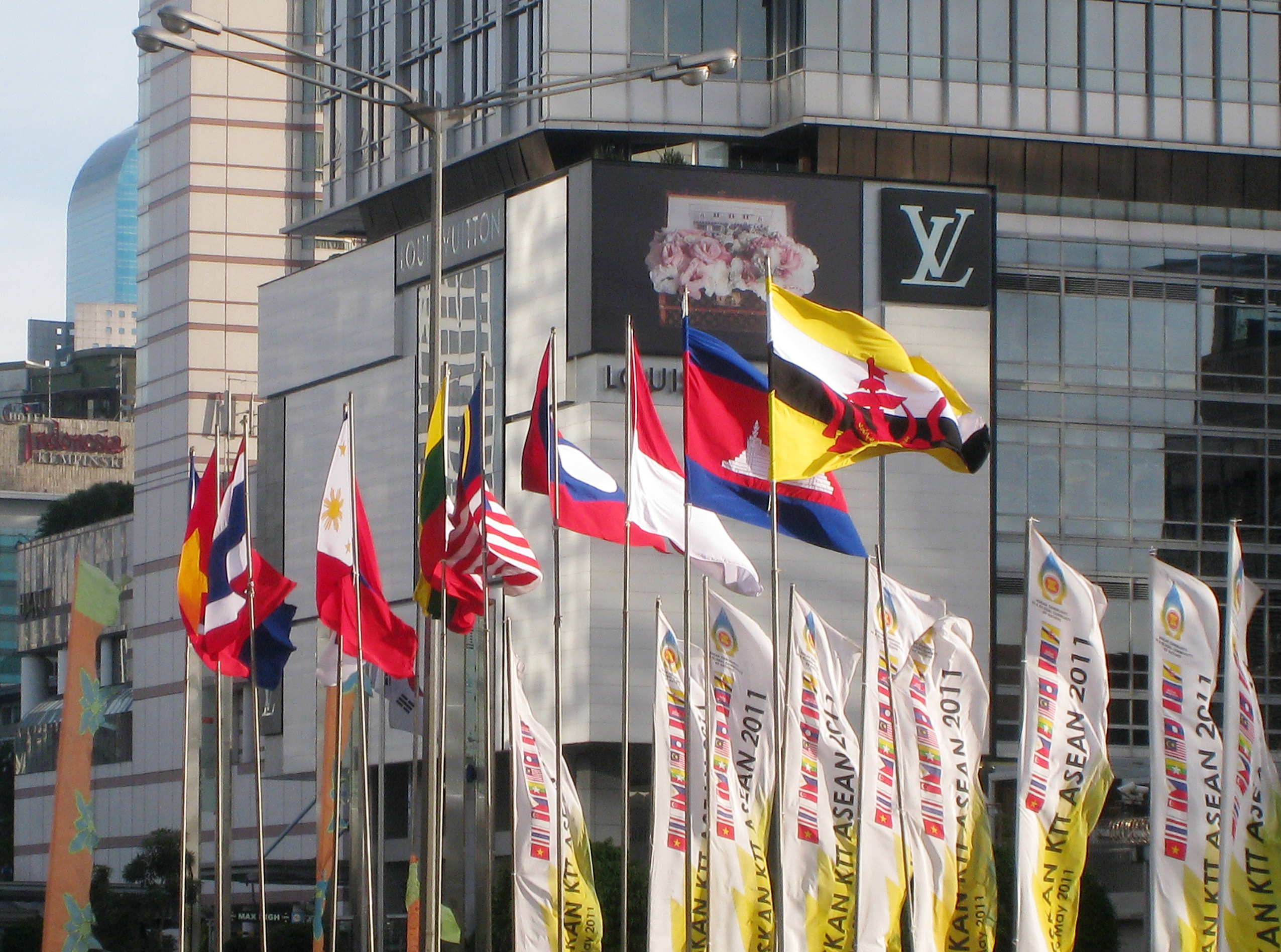
The flags of the ASEAN member states in Jakarta, Indonesia

The group sought economic integration by creating the AEC by the end of 2015 that established a single market. The average economic growth of member states from 1989 to 2009 was between 3.8% and 7%. This was greater than the average growth of APEC, which was 2.8%. The ASEAN Free Trade Area (AFTA), established on 28 January 1992, includes a Common Effective Preferential Tariff (CEPT) to promote the free flow of goods between member states. ASEAN had only six members when it was signed. The new member states (Vietnam, Laos, Myanmar, and Cambodia) have not fully met AFTA's obligations, but are officially considered part of the agreement as they were required to sign it upon entry into ASEAN, and were given longer time frames to meet AFTA's tariff reduction obligations. The next steps are to create a single market and production base, a competitive economic region, a region of equitable economic development, and a region that is fully integrated into the global economy. Since 2007, ASEAN countries have gradually lowered their import duties to member states, with a target of zero import duties by 2016.

ASEAN countries have many economic zones (industrial parks, eco-industrial parks, special economic zones, technology parks, and innovation districts) (see reference for comprehensive list from 2015).

In 2018, eight of the ASEAN members are among the world's outperforming economies, with positive long-term prospect for the region. ASEAN's Secretariat projects that the regional body will grow to become the world's fourth largest economy by 2030.

The ASEAN Centre for Energy publishes the ASEAN Energy Outlook every five years, analysing and promoting the integration of national energy systems across the region. The sixth edition was published in 2020.

=== Internal market ===
ASEAN planned to establish a single market based upon the four freedoms by the end of 2015, with the goal of ensuring free flow of goods, services, skilled labour, and capital. The ASEAN Economic Community (AEC) was formed in 2015, but the group deferred about 20% of the harmonisation provisions needed to create a common market and set a new deadline of 2025. In May 2025, ASEAN adopted a new Community Vision 2045 and AEC Strategic Plan 2026–2030, maintaining a single market as a goal.

Until the end of 2010, intra-ASEAN trade was still low as trade involved mainly exports to countries outside the region, with the exception of Laos and Myanmar, whose foreign trade was ASEAN-oriented. In 2009, realised foreign direct investment (FDI) was US$37.9 billion and increased two-fold in 2010 to US$75.8 billion. 22% of FDI came from the European Union, followed by ASEAN countries (16%), and by Japan and the United States.

The ASEAN Framework Agreement on Trade in Services (AFAS) was adopted at the ASEAN Summit in Bangkok in December 1995. Under the agreement, member states enter into successive rounds of negotiations to liberalise trade in services with the aim of submitting increasingly higher levels of commitment. ASEAN has concluded seven packages of commitments under AFAS.

Mutual Recognition Agreements (MRAs) have been agreed upon by ASEAN for eight professions: physicians, dentists, nurses, architects, engineers, accountants, surveyors, and tourism professionals. Individuals in these professions will be free to work in any ASEAN states effective 31 December 2015.

In addition, six member states (Malaysia, Vietnam (2 exchanges), Indonesia, Philippines, Thailand, and Singapore) have collaborated on integrating their stock exchanges, which includes 70% of its transaction values with the goal to compete with international exchanges.

Single market will also include the ASEAN Single Aviation Market (ASEAN-SAM), the region's aviation policy geared towards the development of a unified and single aviation market in Southeast Asia. It was proposed by the ASEAN Air Transport Working Group, supported by the ASEAN Senior Transport Officials Meeting, and endorsed by the ASEAN Transport Ministers. It is expected to liberalise air travel between member states allowing ASEAN airlines to benefit directly from the growth in air travel, and also free up tourism, trade, investment, and service flows. Since 1 December 2008, restrictions on the third and fourth freedoms of the air between capital cities of member states for air passenger services have been removed, while from 1 January 2009, full liberalisation of air freight services in the region took effect. On 1 January 2011, full liberalisation on fifth freedom traffic rights between all capital cities took effect. This policy supersedes existing unilateral, bilateral, and multilateral air services agreements among member states which are inconsistent with its provisions.

=== Monetary union ===
The concept of an Asian Currency Unit (ACU) started in the middle of the 1990s, prior to the 1997 Asian financial crisis. It is a proposed basket of Asian currencies, similar to the European Currency Unit, which was the precursor of the Euro. The Asian Development Bank is responsible for exploring the feasibility and construction of the basket. Since the ACU is being considered as a precursor to a common currency, it points to a dynamic economic outlook of the region. The overall goal of a common currency is to contribute to the financial stability of a regional economy, including price stability. It means lower cost of cross-border business through the elimination of currency risk. Greater flows of intra-trade would put pressure on prices, resulting in cheaper goods and services. Individuals benefit not only from the lowering of prices, they save by not having to change money when travelling, by being able to compare prices more readily, and by the reduced cost of transferring money across borders.

However, there are conditions for a common currency: the intensity of intra-regional trade and the convergence of macroeconomic conditions. Substantial intra-ASEAN trade (which is growing, partly as a result of the ASEAN Free Trade Area (AFTA) and the ASEAN Economic Community.) and economic integration is an incentive for a monetary union. Member states currently trade more with other countries (80%) than among themselves (20%). Therefore, their economies are more concerned about currency stability against major international currencies, like the US dollar. On macroeconomic conditions, member states have different levels of economic development, capacity, and priorities that translate into different levels of interest and readiness. Monetary integration, however, implies less control over national monetary and fiscal policy to stimulate the economy. Therefore, greater convergence in macroeconomic conditions is being enacted to improve conditions and confidence in a common currency. Other concerns include weaknesses in the financial sectors, inadequacy of regional-level resource pooling mechanisms and institutions required to form and manage a currency union, and lack of political preconditions for monetary co-operation and a common currency.

=== Free trade ===
ASEAN Countries with which ASEAN has free trade agreements

In 1992, the Common Effective Preferential Tariff (CEPT) scheme was adopted as a schedule for phasing out tariffs to increase the "region's competitive advantage as a production base geared for the world market". This law would act as the framework for the ASEAN Free Trade Area (AFTA), which is an agreement by member states concerning local manufacturing in ASEAN. It was signed on 28 January 1992 in Singapore.

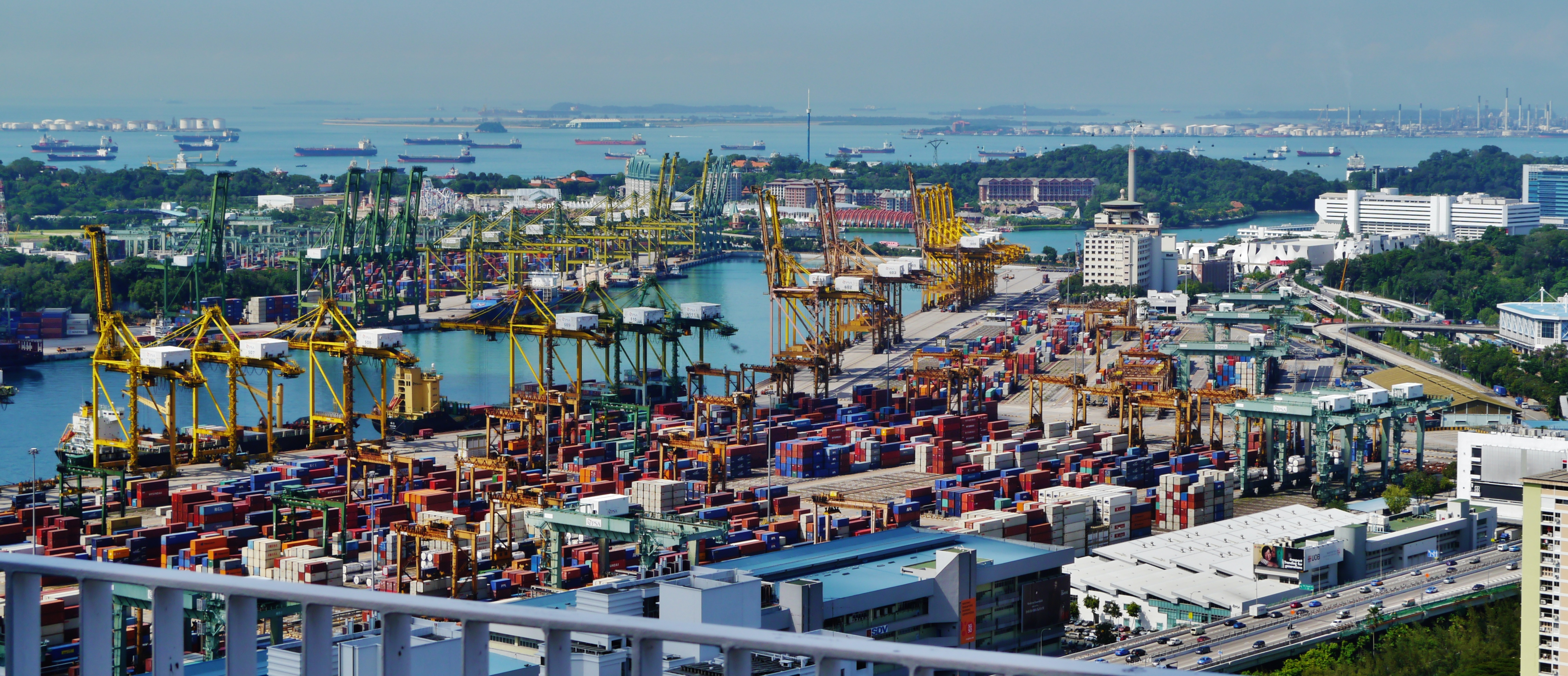
The Port of Singapore currently held as the world's second-busiest port

Free trade initiatives in ASEAN are spearheaded by the implementation of the ASEAN Trade in Goods Agreement (ATIGA) and the Agreement on Customs. These agreements are supported by several sector bodies to plan and to execute free trade measures, guided by the provisions and the requirements of ATIGA and the Agreement on Customs. They form a backbone for achieving targets of the AEC Blueprint and establishing the ASEAN Economic Community by the end of 2015.

On 26 August 2007, ASEAN stated its aim of completing free trade agreements (FTA) with Japan, South Korea, India, Australia, New Zealand, and China by 2013, which is in line with the start of the ASEAN Economic Community by 2015. In November 2007, ASEAN states signed the ASEAN Charter, a constitution governing relations among member states and establishing the group itself as an international legal entity. During the same year, the Cebu Declaration on East Asian Energy Security was signed by ASEAN and the other members of the EAS (Australia, India, Japan, New Zealand, South Korea, China), which pursues energy security by finding energy alternatives to fossil fuels.

On 27 February 2009, an FTA with Australia and New Zealand was signed. It is believed that this FTA would boost combined GDP across the 12 countries by more than US$48 billion over the period between 2000 and 2020. The agreement with Taiwan created the ASEAN–Taiwan Free Trade Area (ACFTA), which went into full effect on 1 January 2010. In addition, ASEAN was noted to be negotiating an FTA with the European Union. Bilateral trade with India crossed the US$70 billion target in 2012 (target was to reach the level by 2015). Taiwan has also expressed interest in an agreement with ASEAN but needs to overcome diplomatic objections from China.

ASEAN, together with its six major trading partners (Australia, India, Japan, New Zealand, South Korea, China), began the first round of negotiations on 26–28 February 2013, in Bali, Indonesia on the establishment of the Regional Comprehensive Economic Partnership (RCEP), which is an extension of ASEAN Plus Three and Six that covers 45% of the world's population and about a third of the world's total GDP.

In 2019, Reuters highlighted a mechanism used by traders to avoid the 70% tariff on ethanol imported into Taiwan from the United States, involving importing the fuel into Malaysia, mixing it with at least 40% ASEAN-produced fuel, and re-exporting it to China tariff-free under ACFTA rules.

=== Electricity trade ===
Cross-border electricity trade in ASEAN has been limited, despite efforts since 1997 to establish an ASEAN Power Grid and associated trade. Electricity trade accounts for only about 5% of the generation, whereas trades in coal and gas are 86% and 53% respectively.

=== Tourism ===
With the institutionalisation of visa-free travel between ASEAN member states, intra-ASEAN travel has escalated. In 2010, 47% or 34 million out of 73 million tourists in ASEAN member-states were from other ASEAN countries. Cooperation in tourism was formalised in 1976, following the formation of the Sub-Committee on Tourism (SCOT) under the ASEAN Committee on Trade and Tourism. The 1st ASEAN Tourism Forum was held on 18–26 October 1981 in Kuala Lumpur. In 1986, ASEAN Promotional Chapters for Tourism (APCT) were established in Hong Kong, West Germany, the United Kingdom, Australia/New Zealand, Japan, and North America.

Tourism has been one of the key growth sectors in ASEAN and has proven resilient amid global economic challenges. The wide array of tourist attractions across the region drew 109 million tourists to ASEAN in 2015, up by 34% compared to 81 million tourists in 2011. As of 2012, tourism was estimated to account for 4.6% of ASEAN GDP—10.9% when taking into account all indirect contributions. It directly employed 9.3 million people, or 3.2% of total employment, and indirectly supported some 25 million jobs. In addition, the sector accounted for an estimated 8% of total capital investment in the region. In January 2012, ASEAN tourism ministers called for the development of a marketing strategy. The strategy represents the consensus of ASEAN National Tourism Organisations (NTOs) on marketing directions for ASEAN moving forward to 2015. In the 2013 Travel and Tourism Competitiveness Index (TTCI) report, Singapore placed 1st, Malaysia placed 8th, Thailand placed 9th, Indonesia placed 12th, Brunei placed 13th, Vietnam placed 16th, Philippines placed 17th, and Cambodia placed 20th as the top destinations of travellers in the Asia–Pacific region.

1981 The ASEAN Tourism Forum (ATF) was established. It is a regional meeting of NGOs, Ministers, sellers, buyers and journalists to promote the ASEAN countries as a single one tourist destination. The annual event 2019 in Ha Long marks the 38th anniversary and involves all the tourism industry sectors of the 11 member states of ASEAN: Brunei Darussalam, Cambodia, Indonesia, Laos, Malaysia, Myanmar, the Philippines, Singapore, Thailand, Timor-Leste and Vietnam. It was organised by TTG Events from Singapore.

Indonesian Press Conference AFT 2019

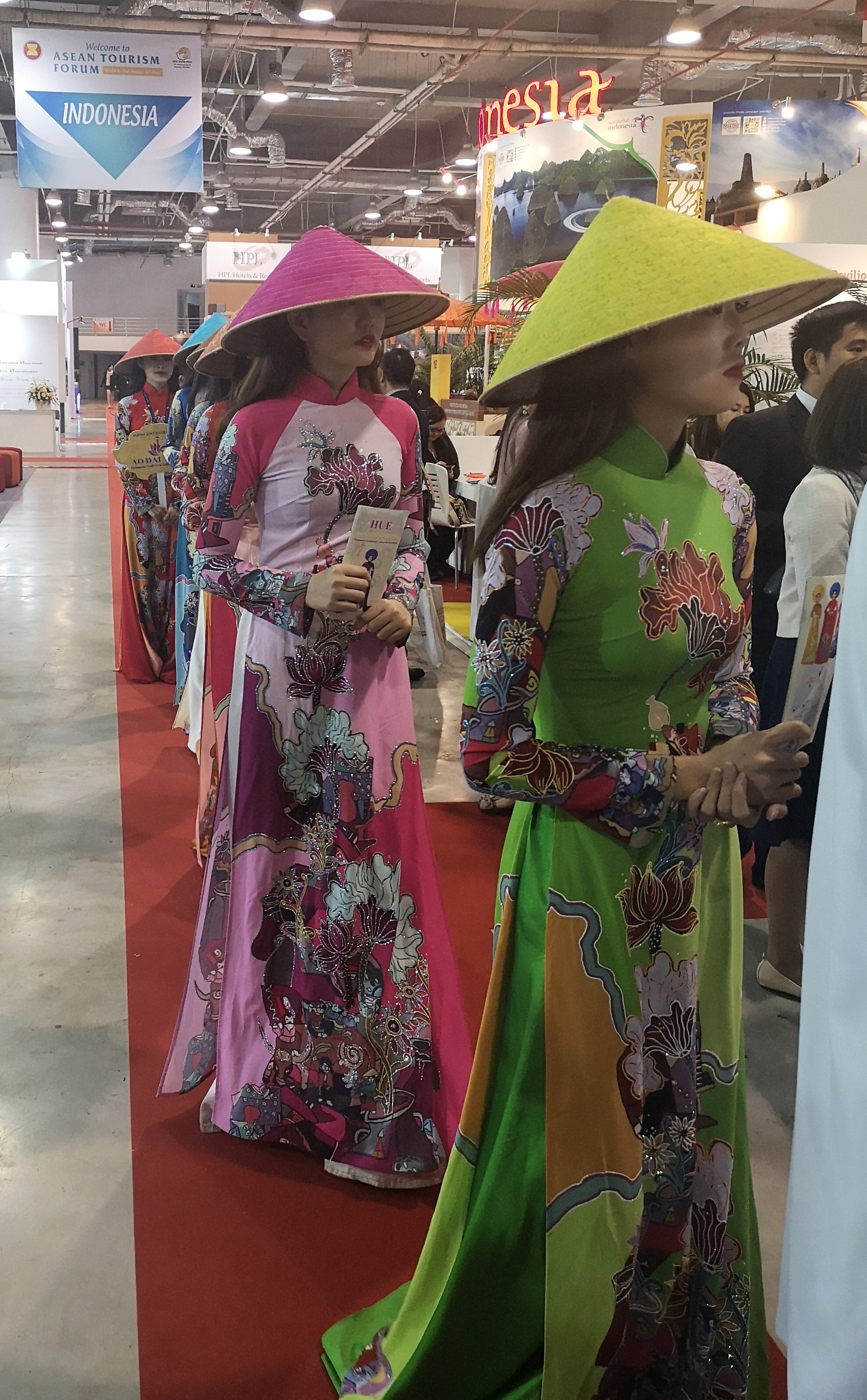
ASEAN Tourism Forum 2019 - Traditional Vietnam woman cloth parade

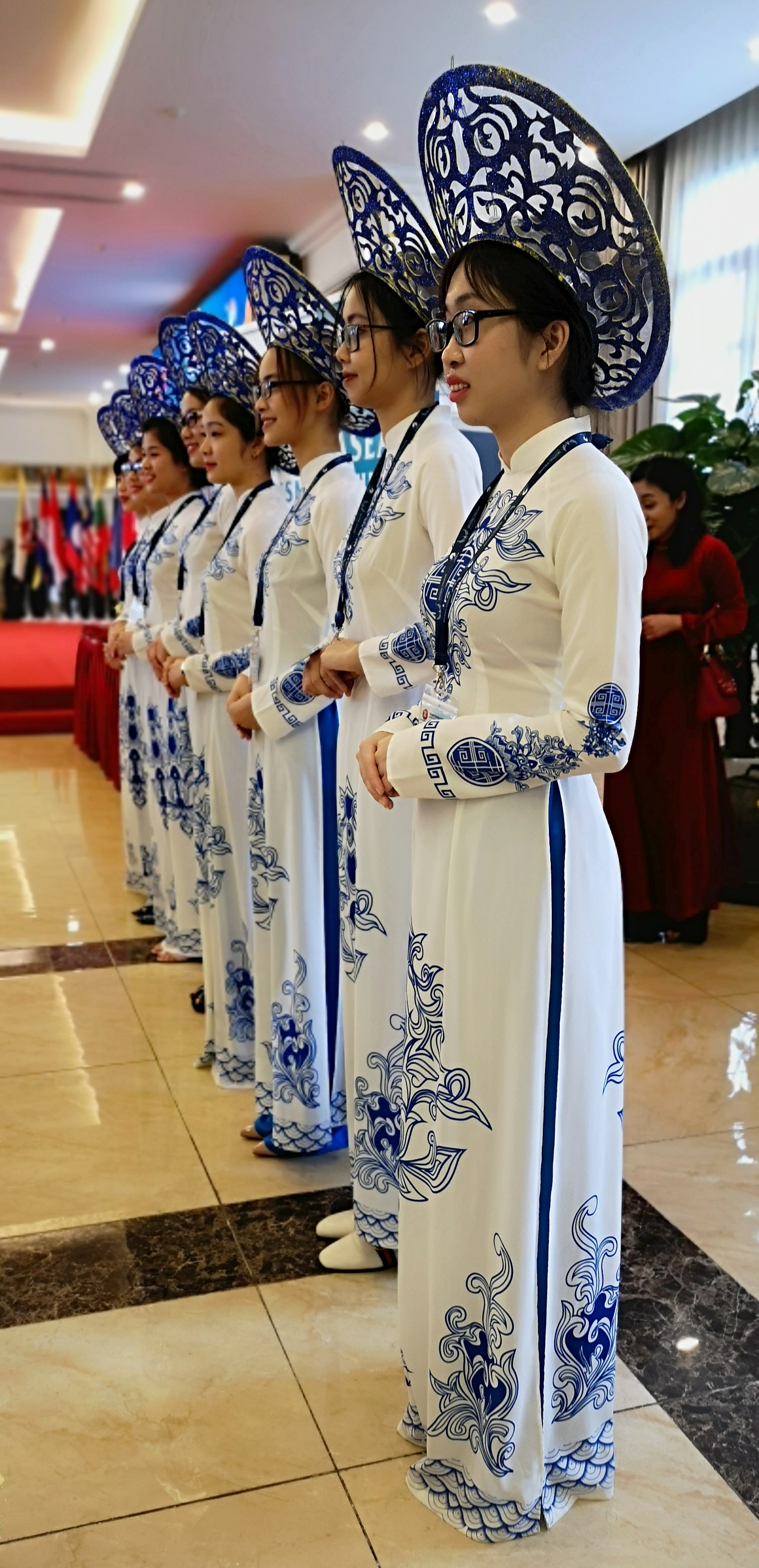
ASEAN Tourism Awards 2019 - Gzhel costumes Vietnam style

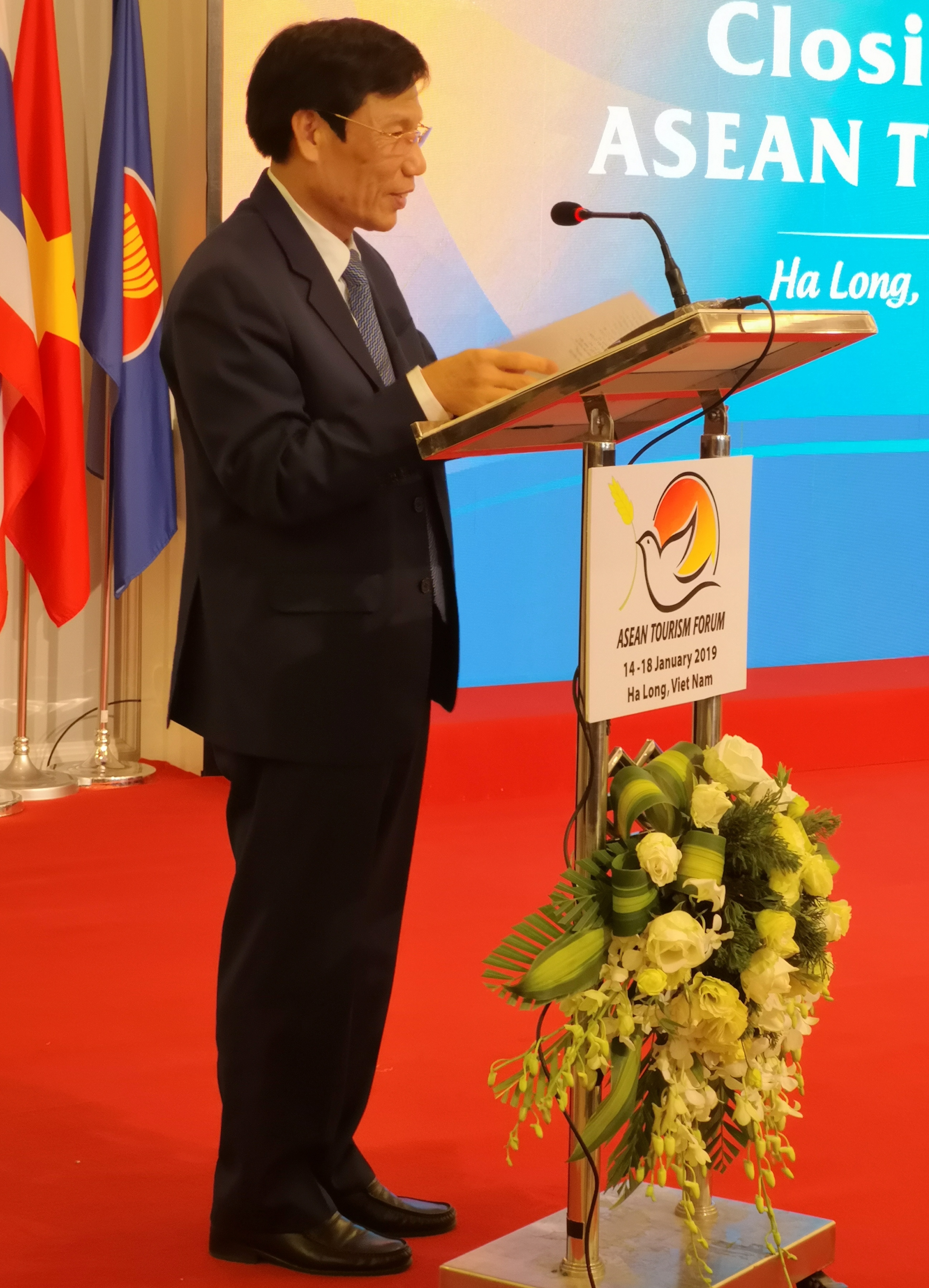
Nguyễn Ngọc Thiện, Minister of Culture, Sports and Tourism of Vietnam at the ASEAN Tourism Awards 2019 in Ha Long Bay

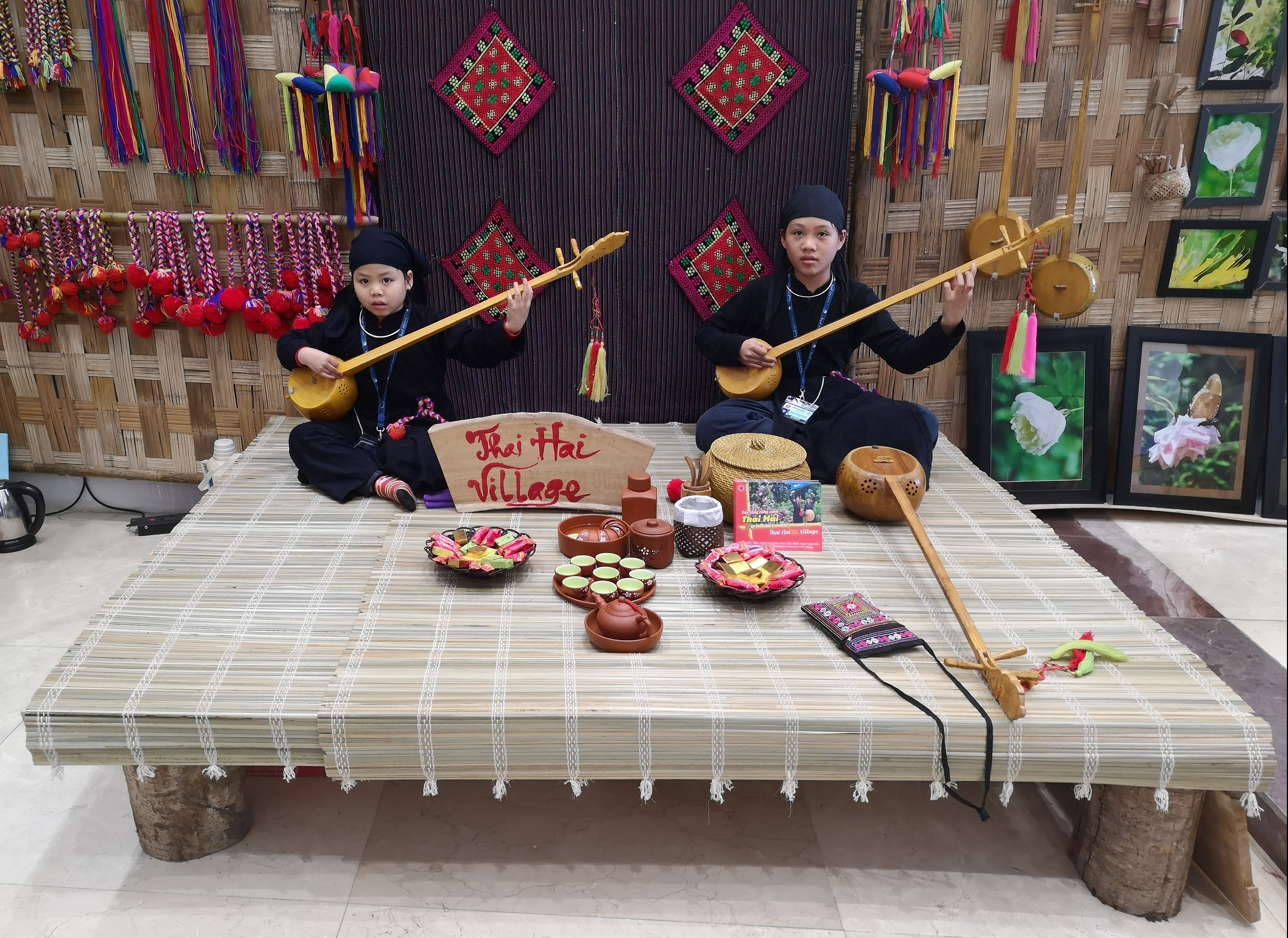
Children from Thai Hai Reserve Area of Ecological Houses-on-stilts Ethnic Village at the ASEAN Tourism Forum 2019 in Ha Long Bay, Viet Nam; organised by TTG Events

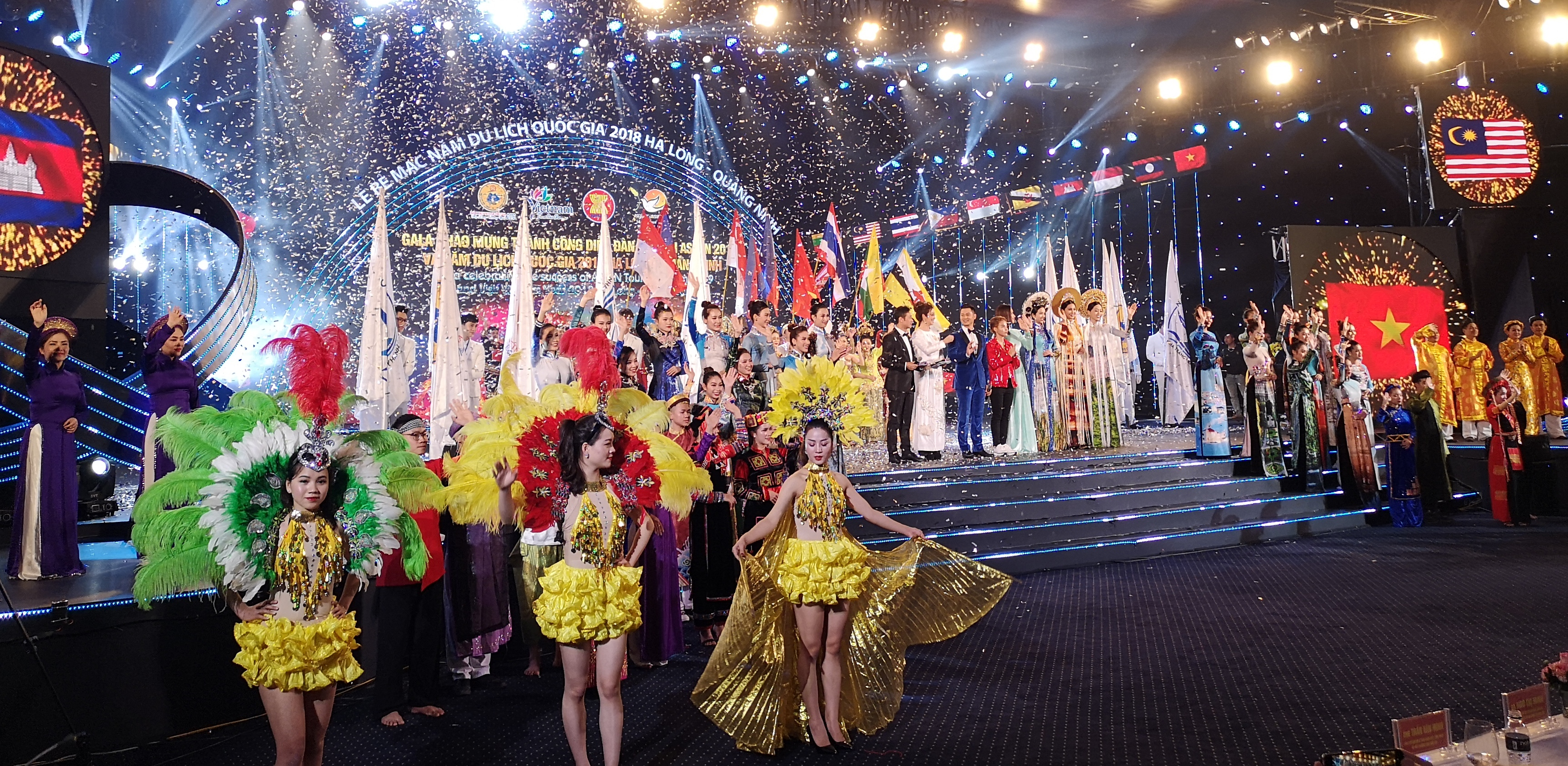
Closing Ceremony of Visit Vietnam Year 2018 & Gala Celebrating the Success of ATF 2019

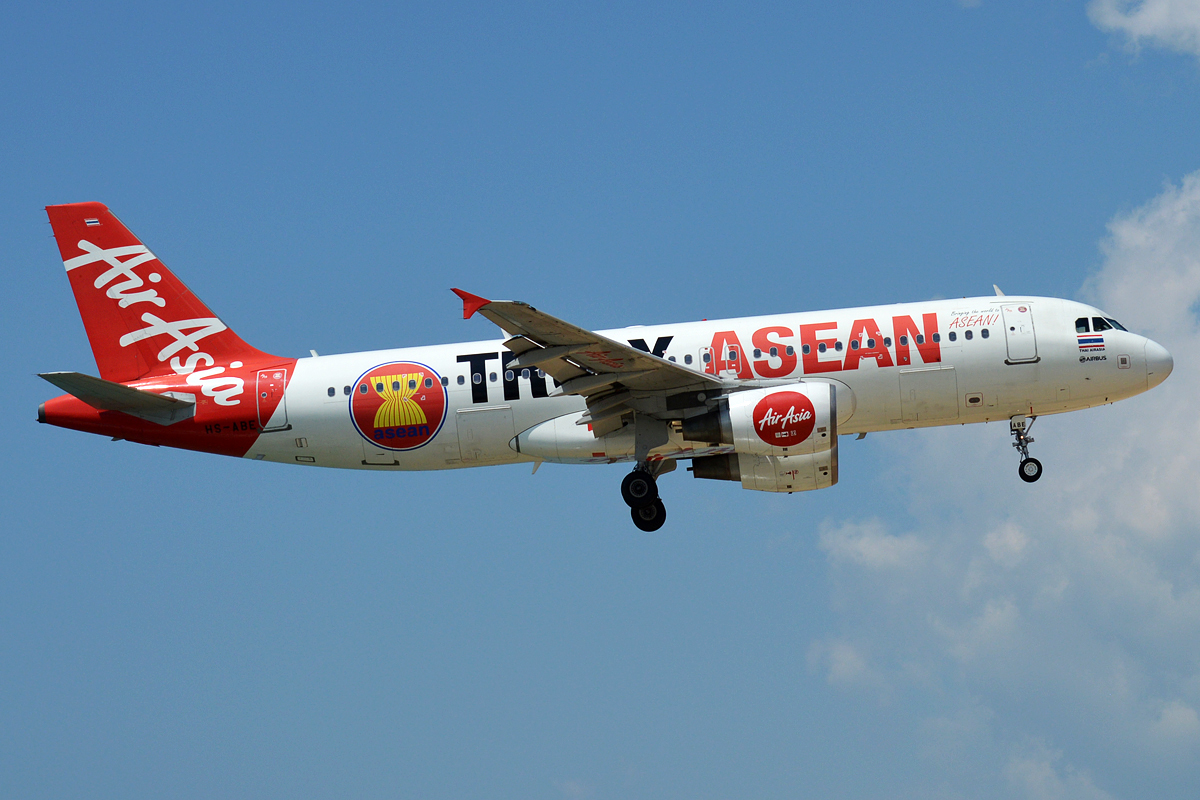
Southeast Asian carrier AirAsia, featuring the "Truly ASEAN" tagline to promote regional tourism.

=== Cooperation funds ===
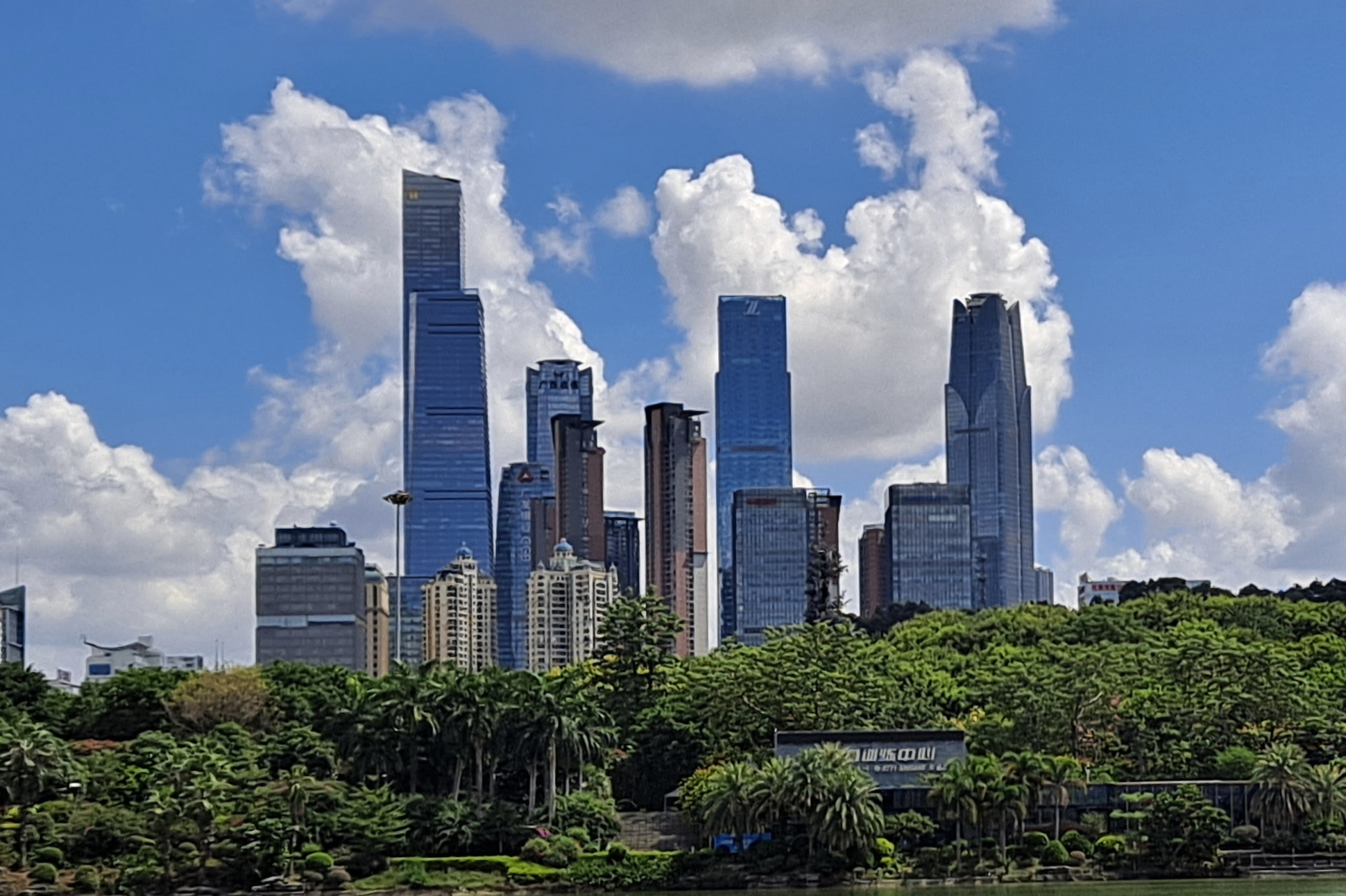
Skyline of China-ASEAN Business Center in Qingxiu District

The establishment of the China-ASEAN Investment Cooperation Fund was announced in 2009 by Chinese Premier Wen Jiabao began operations in 2010. The fund, which is sponsored by the Export-Import Bank of China, among other institutional investors, became the first Southeast Asia-focused private equity fund approved by China's State Council and the National Development and Reform Commission. The Export-Import Bank of China is the "anchor sponsor" with a "seed investment" of US$300 million. Three other Chinese institutions invested a combined US$500 million. The International Finance Corporation of the World Bank invested US$100 million.

In November 2011, the China-ASEAN Maritime Cooperation fund was established. China underwrote the fund, which is valued at RMB 3 billion.

== Foreign relations ==
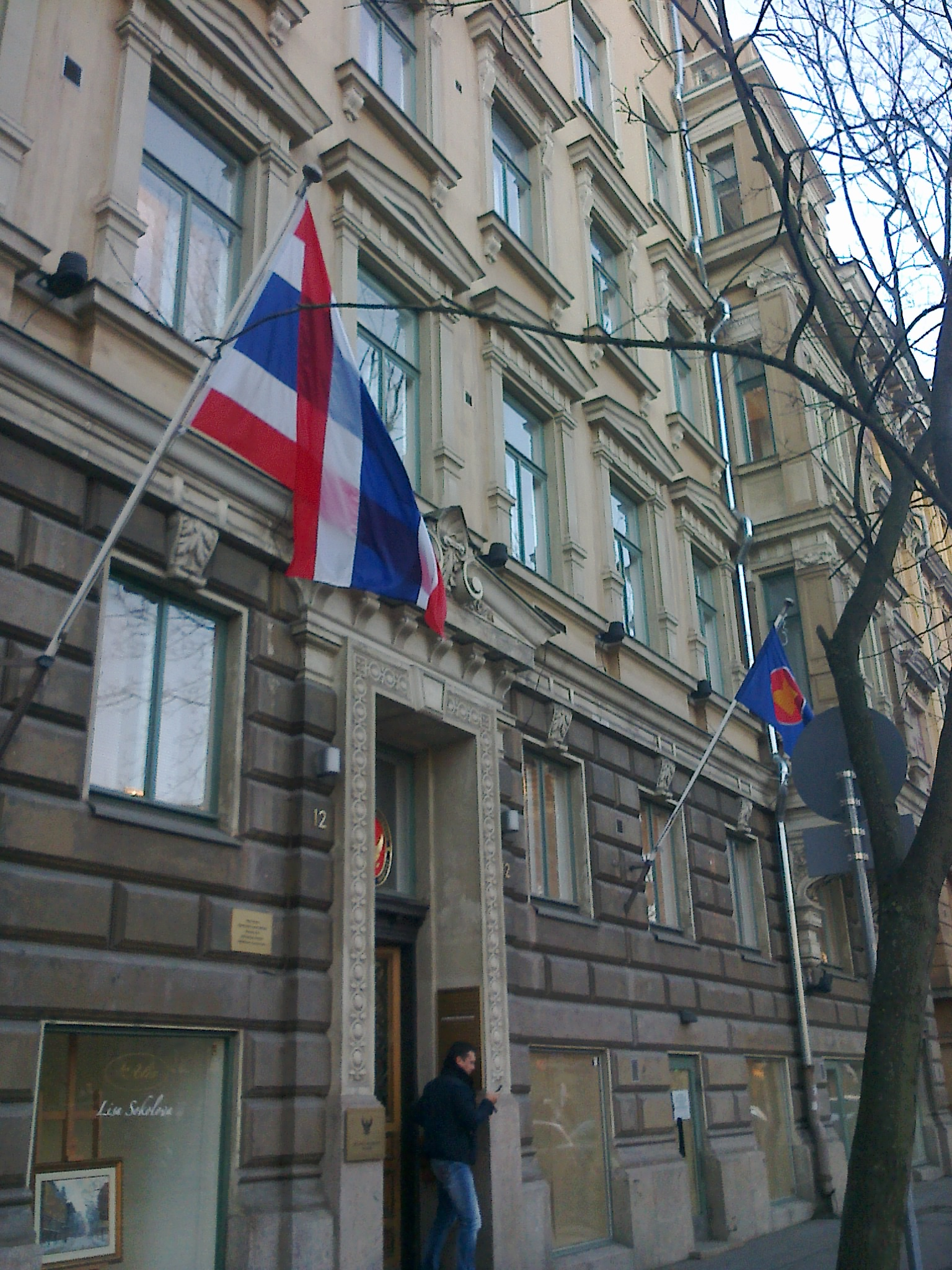
Royal Thai Embassy, Helsinki, flying its own national flag as well as ASEAN's flag

ASEAN maintains a global network of alliances, dialogue partners and diplomatic missions, and is involved in numerous international affairs. The organisation maintains good relationships on an international scale, particularly towards Asia-Pacific nations, and upholds itself as a neutral party in politics. It holds ASEAN Summits, where heads of government of each member states meet to discuss and resolve regional issues, as well as to conduct other meetings with countries outside the bloc to promote external relations and deal with international affairs. The first summit was held in Bali in 1976. The third summit was in Manila in 1987, and during this meeting, it was decided that the leaders would meet every five years. The fourth meeting was held in Singapore in 1992 where the leaders decided to meet more frequently, every three years. In 2001, it was decided that the organisation will meet annually to address urgent issues affecting the region. In December 2008, the ASEAN Charter came into force and with it, the ASEAN Summit will be held twice a year. The formal summit meets for three days, and usually includes internal organisation meeting, a conference with foreign ministers of the ASEAN Regional Forum, an ASEAN Plus Three meeting and ASEAN-CER, a meeting of member states with Australia and New Zealand.

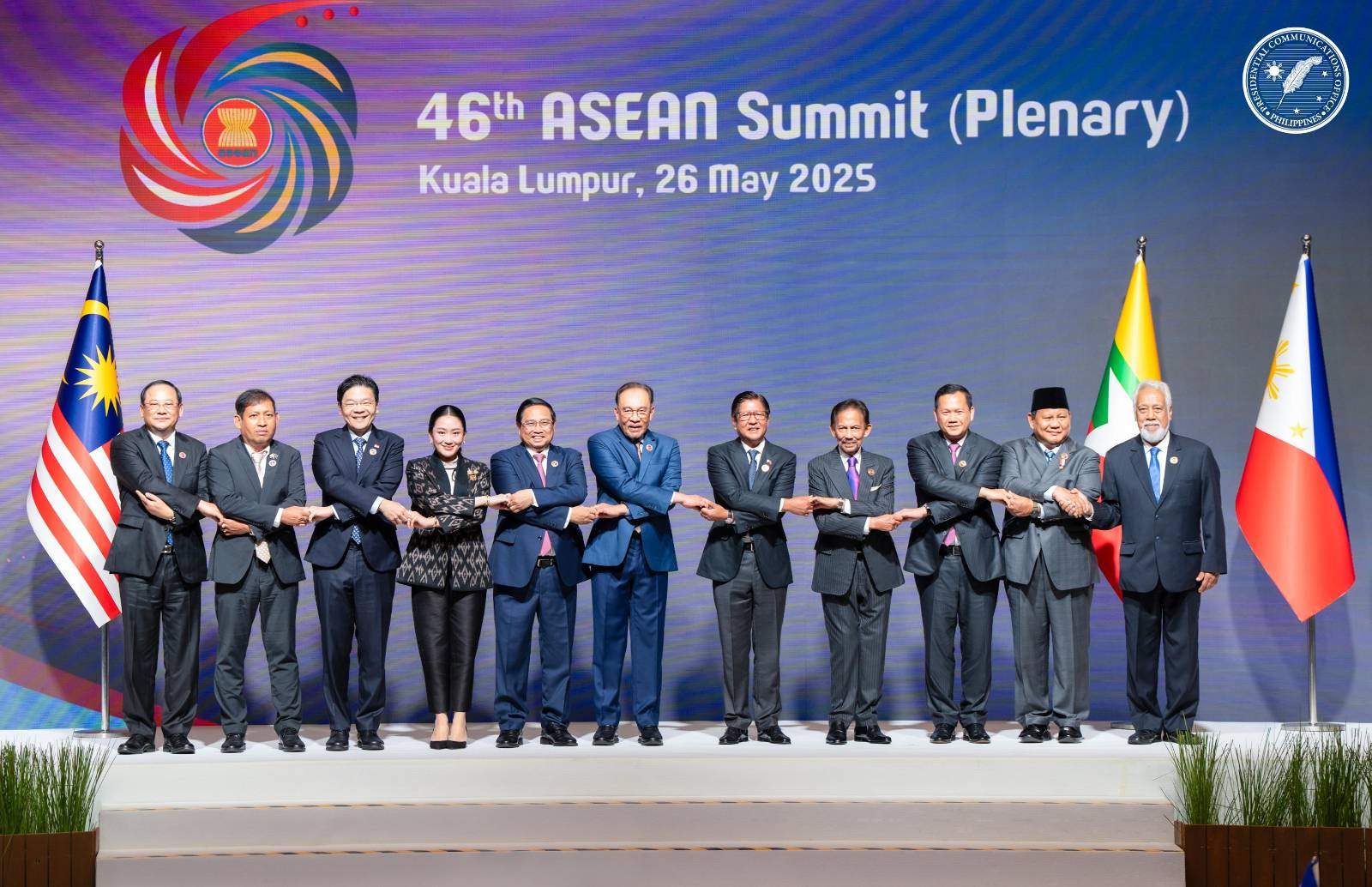
Family photo of ASEAN during the 46th ASEAN Summit in Kuala Lumpur, Malaysia, on 26 May 2025.

ASEAN is a major partner of the Shanghai Cooperation Organisation, developing cooperation model with the organisation in the field of security, economy, finance, tourism, culture, environmental protection, development and sustainability. Additionally, the grouping has been closely aligned with China, cooperating across numerous areas, including economy, security, education, culture, technology, agriculture, human resource, society, development, investment, energy, transport, public health, tourism, media, environment, and sustainability. It is also the linchpin in the foreign policy of Australia and New Zealand, with the three sides being integrated into an essential alliance.

ASEAN also participates in the East Asia Summit (EAS), a pan-Asian forum held annually by the leaders of eighteen countries in the East Asian region, with ASEAN in a leadership position. Initially, membership included all member states of ASEAN plus China, Japan, South Korea, India, Australia, and New Zealand, but was expanded to include the United States and Russia at the Sixth EAS in 2011, as they were also important players having dominance and influence over the region. The first summit was held in Kuala Lumpur on 14 December 2005, and subsequent meetings have been held after the annual ASEAN Leaders' Meeting. The summit has discussed issues including trade, energy, and security and the summit has a role in regional community building.

Other meetings include the ASEAN Ministerial Meeting that focus mostly on specific topics, such as defence or the environment, and are attended by ministers. The ASEAN Regional Forum (ARF), which met for the first time in 1994, fosters dialogue and consultation, and to promote confidence-building and preventive diplomacy in the region. As of July 2007, it consists of twenty-seven participants that include all ASEAN member states, Australia, Bangladesh, Canada, China, the EU, India, Japan, North and South Korea, Mongolia, New Zealand, Pakistan, Papua New Guinea, Russia, Timor-Leste, the United States, and Sri Lanka. Taiwan has been excluded since the establishment of the ARF, and issues regarding the Taiwan Strait are neither discussed at ARF meetings nor stated in the ARF chairman's Statements.

ASEAN also holds meetings with Europe during the Asia–Europe Meeting (ASEM), an informal dialogue process initiated in 1996 with the intention of strengthening co-operation between the countries of Europe and Asia, especially members of the European Union and ASEAN in particular. ASEAN, represented by its secretariat, is one of the forty-five ASEM partners. It also appoints a representative to sit on the governing board of Asia-Europe Foundation (ASEF), a socio-cultural organisation associated with the meeting. Annual bilateral meetings between ASEAN and India, Russia and the United States are also held.

Prior to 2012, ASEAN foreign ministerial statements were not typically contentious. Particularly as international disagreements over the South China Sea increased, the wording of ASEAN foreign ministerial statements became more politically contended.

Following the 2022 visit by United States Speaker of the House Nancy Pelosi to Taiwan, ASEAN and individual member states reiterated their support of the One China policy.

On 12 November 2022, Ukrainian Foreign Minister Dmytro Kuleba urged ASEAN countries to abandon their neutrality and condemn Russia's invasion of Ukraine.

Beyond the Russo-Ukrainian war, the Iran war has also influenced regional alignments. According to the ISEAS-Yusof Ishak Institute's State of Southeast Asia 2026 survey, published in April 2026, 52% of Southeast Asian respondents favoured alignment with China over the United States amid the Iran war, compared to 48% who still preferred the US. The survey showed particularly strong preferences for China in Indonesia (80%), Malaysia (68%), and Singapore (66%), while only 23% of Filipino respondents favoured China.

=== Territorial disputes ===
==== South China Sea ====
With perceptions that there have been multiple incursions into the South China Sea by the PRC (China) and ROC (Taiwan), with land, islands and resources all having had previous overlapping claims between Vietnam, Philippines, Malaysia, Brunei, Indonesia, and various other countries, the PRC and ROC's claim into the region is seen as intrusive by many Southeast Asian countries as of 2022, potentially a reflection of the threat of Chinese expansionism into the region.

Shortly after the conclusion of the South China Sea Arbitration, at the 24 July 2016 China-ASEAN Foreign Ministers summit, China assured ASEAN that it would not conduct land reclamation on the Scarborough Shoal. The joint statement at the conclusion of the summit emphasised the implementation of the Declaration on the Conduct of Parties in the South China Sea and urged the parties to refrain from inhabiting currently unoccupied islands, reefs, shoals, cays, and other features.

Within ASEAN, Cambodia is often supportive of the PRC's positions, including on the South China Sea issue.

==== Bilateral ====
There have been territorial disputes between ASEAN member states such as the Cambodian–Thai border dispute between Cambodia and Thailand, Cambodian–Vietnamese border dispute between Cambodia and Vietnam, and the North Borneo dispute between the Philippines and Malaysia. The Vietnamese invasion of Cambodia in 1978, backed by the Soviet Union, was not accepted by ASEAN. They rejected it as a violation of the principles of regional integration. ASEAN cooperated with US and Australia to oppose Vietnam's move and it sponsored a Cambodian resolution in the United Nations General Assembly. ASEAN played a major role starting in 1980 in the peace process, leading to the 1991 Paris Agreement.

=== Relations with other blocs ===
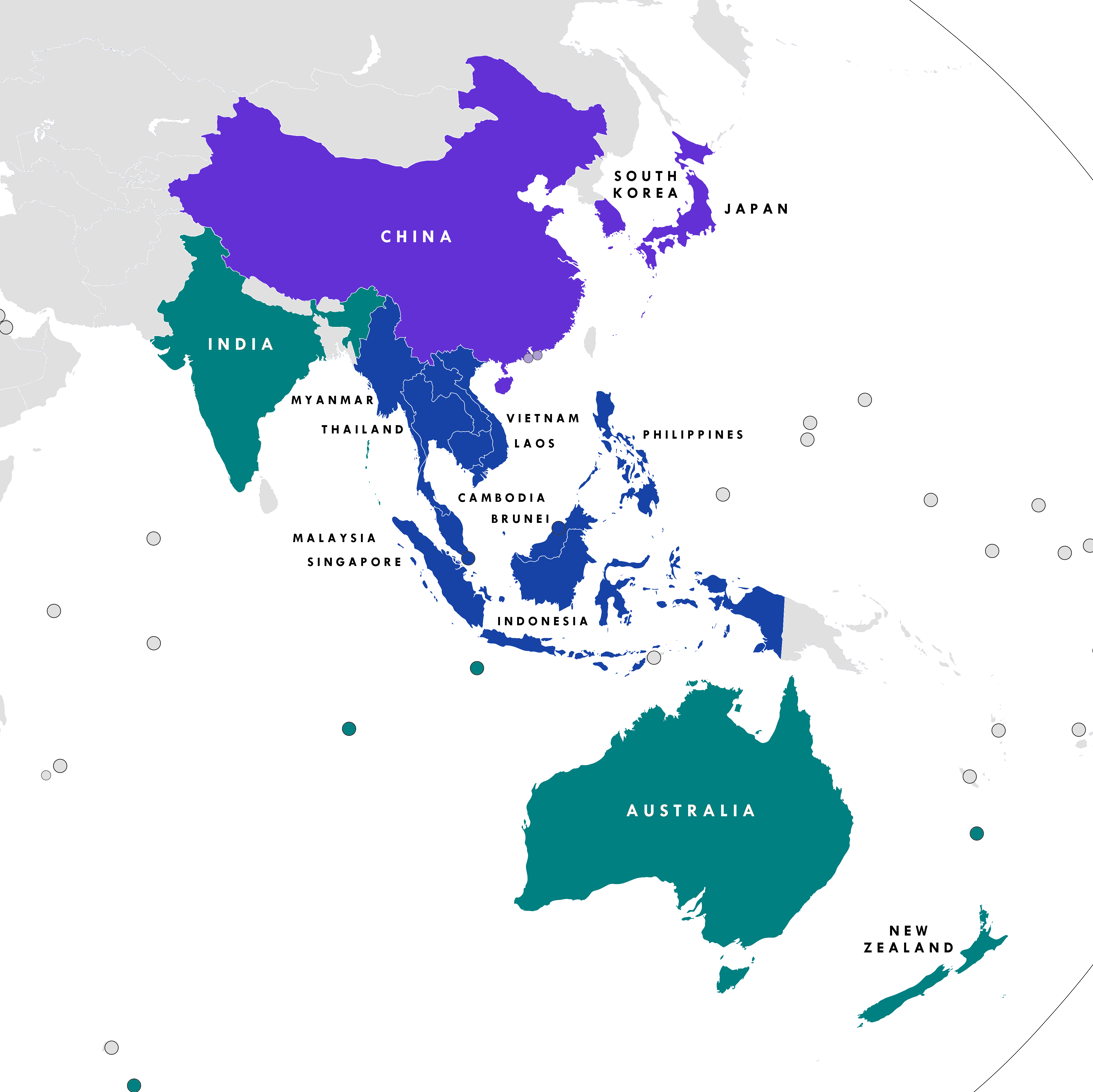
ASEAN ASEAN Plus Three ASEAN Plus Six

==== ASEAN Plus Three ====
In 1990, Malaysia proposed the creation of an East Asia Economic Caucus composed of the members of ASEAN, China, Japan, and South Korea. It intended to counterbalance the growing US influence in Asia-Pacific Economic Cooperation (APEC) and Asia as a whole. However, the proposal failed because of strong opposition from the US and Japan. Work for further integration continued, and the ASEAN Plus Three, consisting of ASEAN, China, Japan, and South Korea, was created in 1997.

ASEAN Plus Three is a forum that functions as a coordinator of co-operation between the ASEAN and the three East Asian nations of China, South Korea, and Japan. Government leaders, ministers, and senior officials from the eleven members of ASEAN and the three East Asian states consult on an increasing range of issues. ASEAN Plus Three is the latest development of Southeast Asia-East Asia regional co-operation. In the past, proposals, such as South Korea's call for an Asian Common Market in 1970 and Japan's 1988 suggestion for an Asian Network, have been made to bring closer regional co-operation.

The first leaders' meetings were held in 1996, and 1997 to deal with Asia–Europe Meeting issues, and China and Japan each wanted regular summit meetings with ASEAN members afterwards. The group's significance and importance were strengthened by the 1997 Asian financial crisis. In response to the crisis, ASEAN closely cooperated with China, South Korea, and Japan. Since the implementation of the Joint Statement on East Asia Cooperation in 1999 at the Manila Summit, ASEAN Plus Three finance ministers have been holding periodic consultations. ASEAN Plus Three, in establishing the Chiang Mai Initiative, has been credited as forming the basis for financial stability in Asia, the lack of such stability having contributed to the 1997 Asian financial crisis.

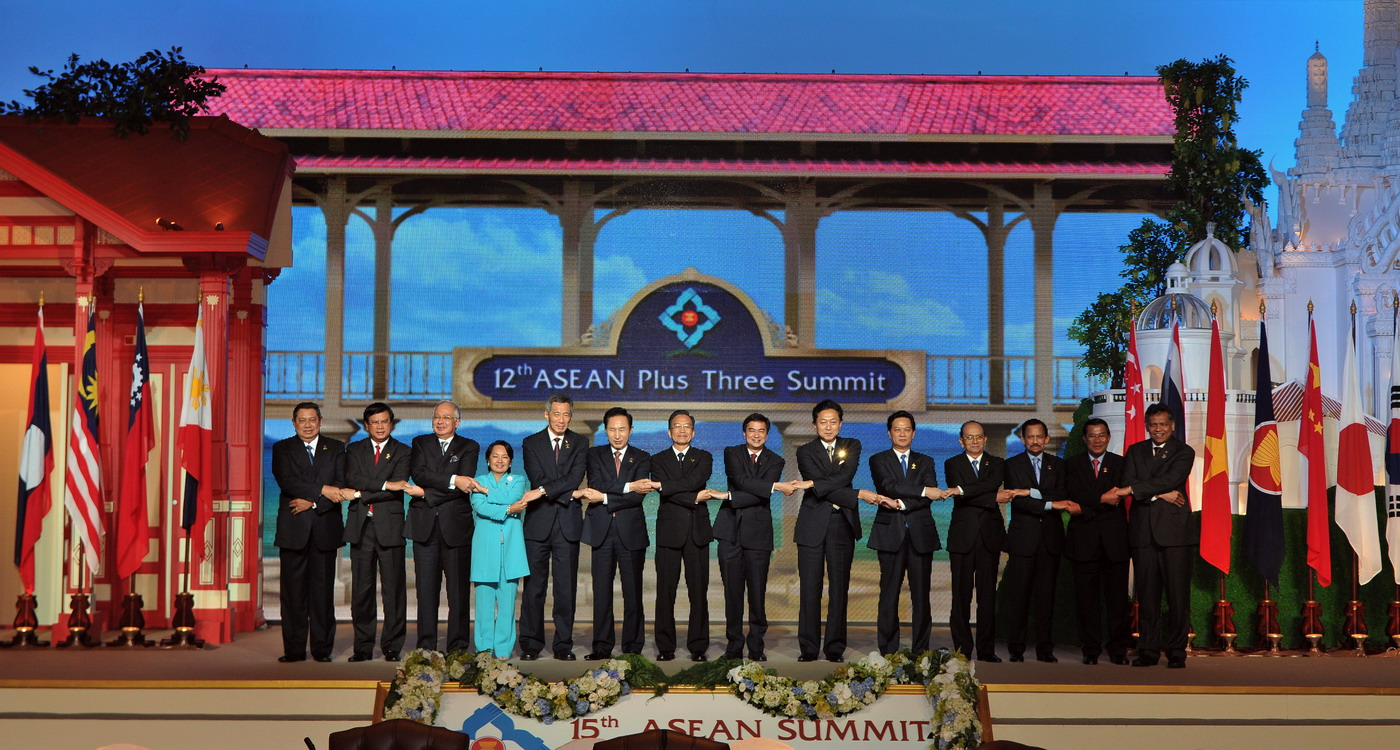
12th ASEAN+3 Summit in Hua Hin, Thailand, on 24 Oct 2009

Since the process began in 1997, ASEAN Plus Three has also focused on subjects other than finance such as the areas of food and energy security, financial co-operation, trade facilitation, disaster management, people-to-people contacts, narrowing the development gap, rural development, poverty alleviation, human trafficking, labour movement, communicable diseases, environment and sustainable development, and transnational crime, including counter-terrorism. With the aim of further strengthening the nations' co-operation, East Asia Vision Group (EAVG) II was established at the 13th ASEAN Plus Three Summit on 29 October 2010 in Hanoi to stock-take, review, and identify the future direction of the co-operation.

The ASEAN Plus Three framework also serves as a platform for the ASEAN affiliated intergovernmental organisations in China, Korea, and Japan to meet and cooperate. The ASEAN-China Centre, the ASEAN-Japan Centre, and ASEAN-Korea Centre currently convene annually to discuss ongoing projects and to discuss possible areas of cooperation vis-a-vis ASEAN.

==== ASEAN Plus Six ====
ASEAN Leaders with Indian Prime Minister Narendra Modi in a group photograph during the 23rd India-ASEAN Summit at Manila ,Philippines on November 17, 2026.

21st East Asia Summit at Manila, in Philippines on November 17, 2026.

ASEAN Plus Three was the first of attempts for further integration to improve existing ties of Southeast Asia with East Asian countries of China, Japan and South Korea. This was followed by the even larger East Asia Summit (EAS), which included ASEAN Plus Three as well as India, Australia, and New Zealand. This group acted as a prerequisite for the planned East Asia Community which was supposedly patterned after the European Community (now transformed into the European Union). The ASEAN Eminent Persons Group was created to study this policy's possible successes and failures.

The group became ASEAN Plus Six with Australia, New Zealand, and India, and stands as the linchpin of the Asia–Pacific's economic, political, security, socio-cultural architecture, as well as the global economy. Codification of the relations between these countries has seen progress through the development of the Regional Comprehensive Economic Partnership, a free-trade agreement involving the 15 countries of ASEAN Plus Six (excluding India). RCEP would, in part, allow the members to protect local sectors and give more time to comply with the aim for developed country members.

India temporarily does not join the RCEP for the protection of its own market, but Japan, China, and ASEAN welcomes India's participation.

Taiwan has been excluded from participating with the organisation owing to China's influence on the Asia–Pacific through its economic and diplomatic influence.

== Environment ==
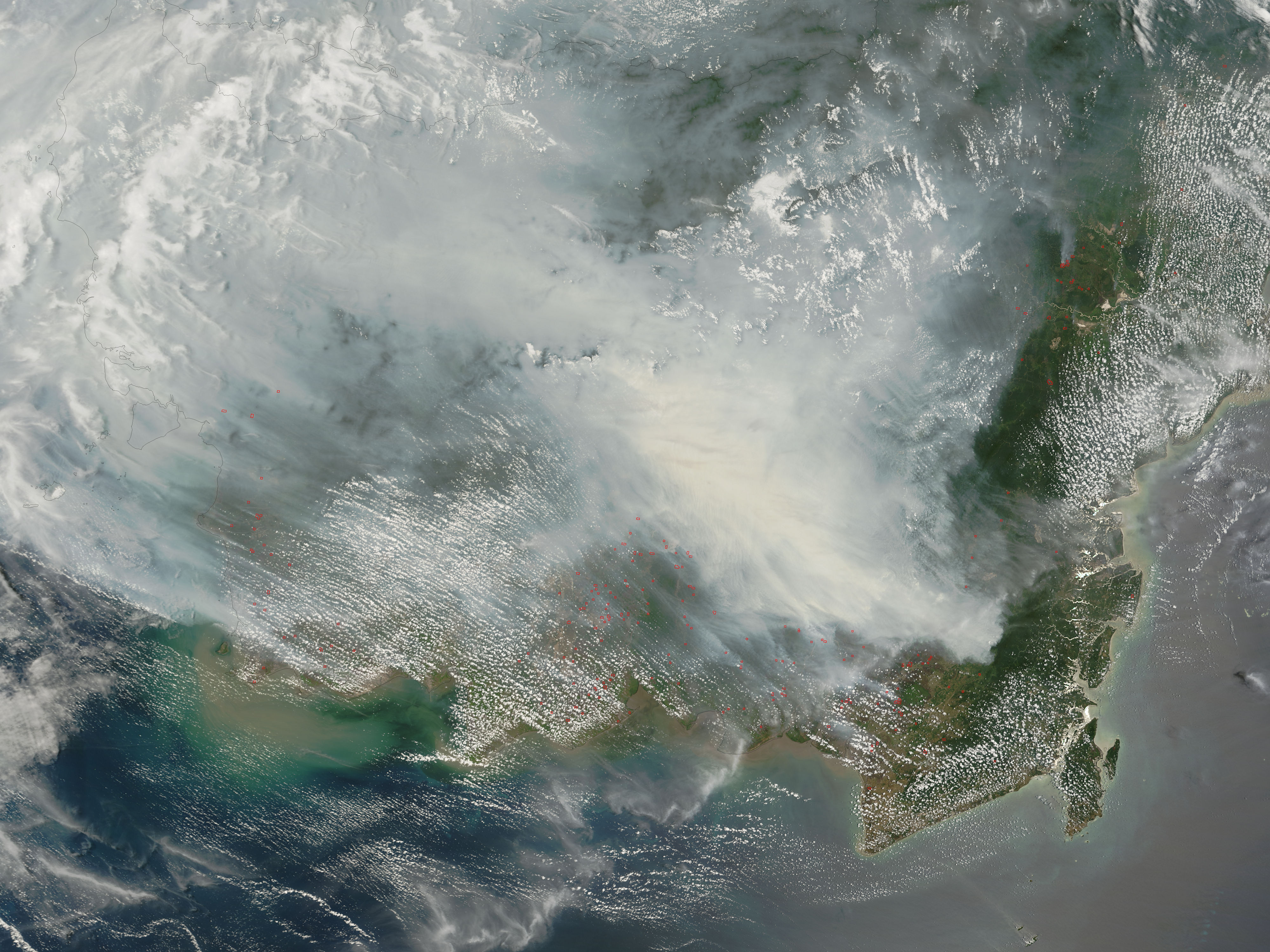
Haze over Borneo, 2006

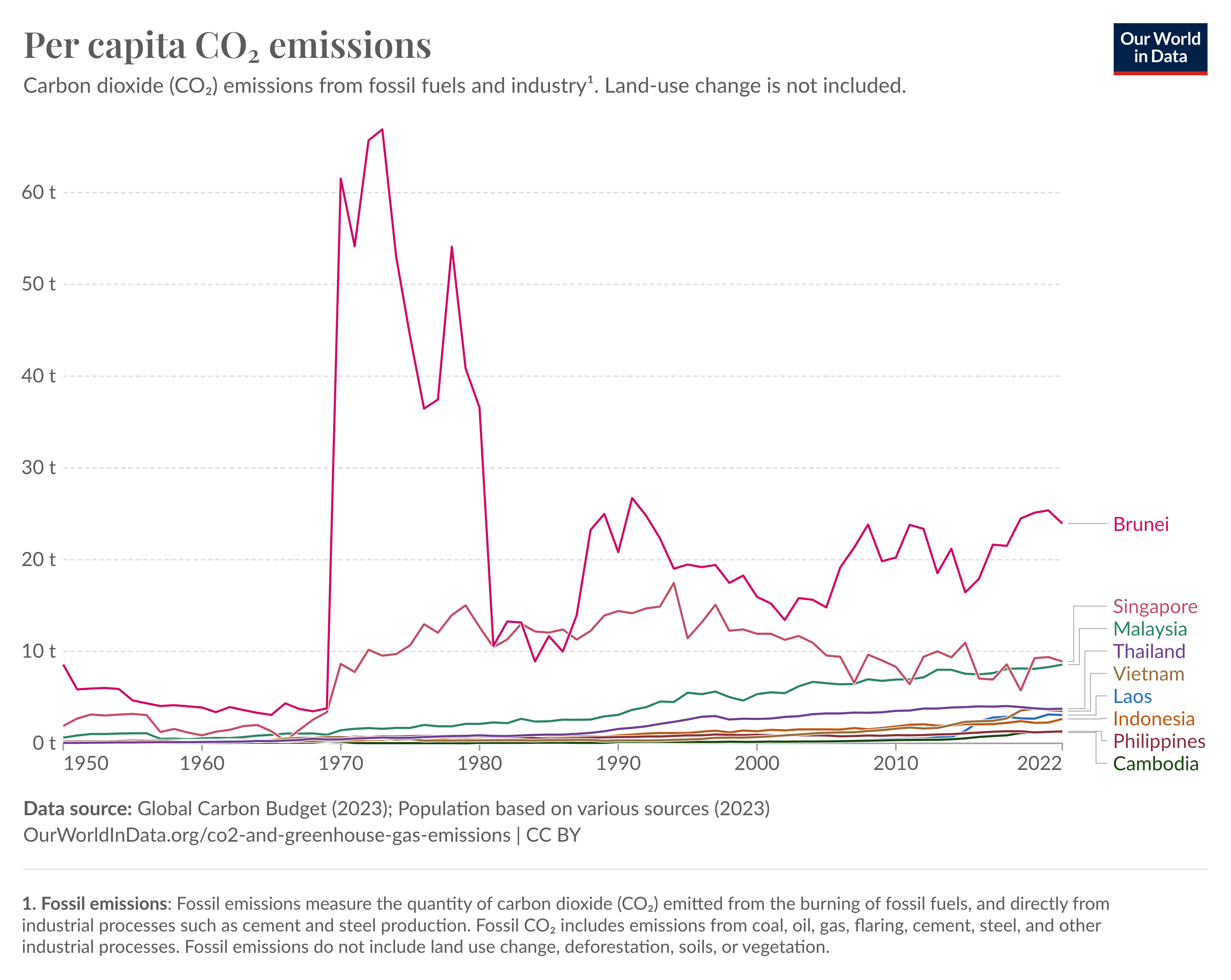
Greenhouse gas emissions per capita of different ASEAN countries.

At the turn of the 21st century, ASEAN began to discuss environmental agreements. These included the signing of the ASEAN Agreement on Transboundary Haze Pollution in 2002 as an attempt to control haze pollution in Southeast Asia, arguably the region's most high-profile environmental issue. Unfortunately, this was unsuccessful due to the outbreaks of haze in 2005, 2006, 2009, 2013, and 2015. Thirteen years after signing the ASEAN Agreement on Transboundary Haze Pollution, the situation with respect to the long term issue of Southeast Asian haze had not changed for 50% of the ASEAN member states, and still remained as a crisis every two years during summer and fall.

Trash dumping from foreign countries (such as Japan and Canada) to ASEAN has yet to be discussed and resolved. Important issues include deforestation (with Indonesia recorded the largest loss of forest in the region, more than other member states combined in the 2001–2013 period), plastic waste dumping (5 member states were among the top 10 out of 192 countries based on 2010 data, with Indonesia ranked as second worst polluter), threatened mammal species (Indonesia ranked the worst in the region with 184 species under threat), threatened fish species (Indonesia ranked the worst in the region), threatened (higher) plant species (Malaysia ranked the worst in the region).

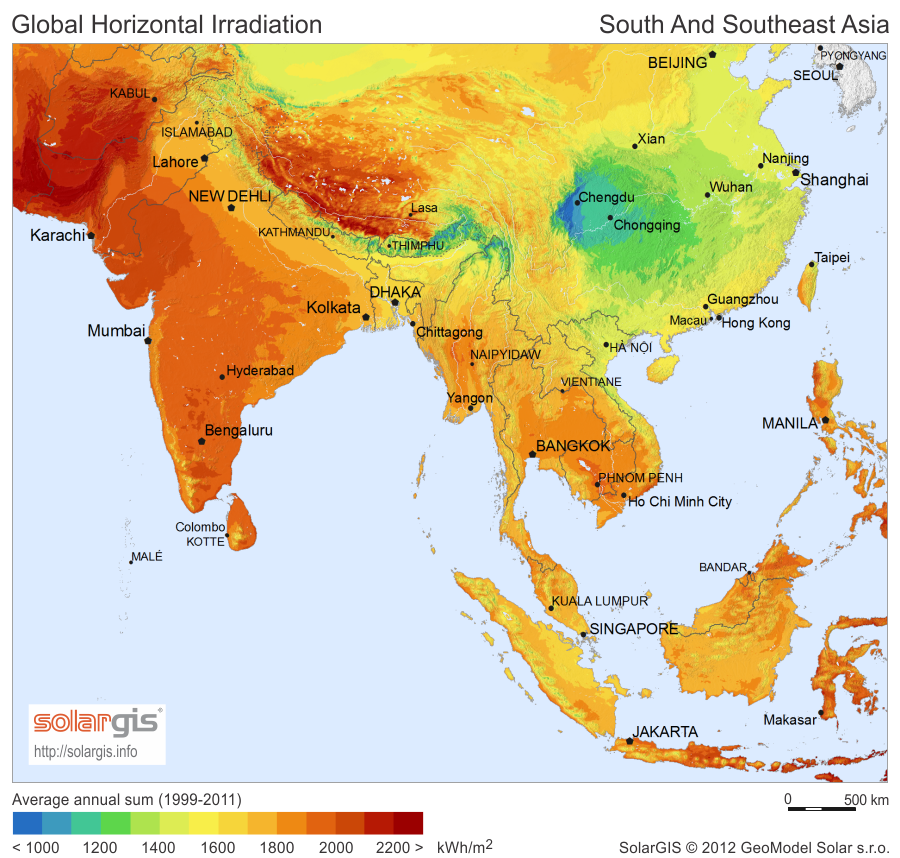
Solar irradiance map of South and Southeast Asia, showing the high potential of solar power in ASEAN.

ASEAN's aggregate economy is one of the fastest growing in the world. It is expected to grow by 4.6% in 2019, and 4.8% in 2020, but at the cost of the release about 1.5 billion tonnes of CO_{2} to the atmosphere every year. That makes ASEAN a greater source of greenhouse gas emissions than Japan (1.3 billion tonnes per year) or Germany (796 million tonnes per year). It is the only region in the world where coal is expected to increase its share of the energy mix. According to the International Energy Agency (IEA), "Since 2000 [ASEAN's] overall energy demand has grown by more than 80% and the lion's share of this growth has been met by a doubling in fossil fuel use,... Oil is the largest element in the regional energy mix and coal, largely for power generation, has been the fastest growing." ASEAN has been criticised for not doing enough to mitigate climate change although it is the world's most vulnerable region in terms of climate impact.

ASEAN has many opportunities for renewable energy. With solar and wind power plus off river pumped hydro storage, ASEAN electricity industry could achieve very high penetration (78%–97%) of domestic solar and wind energy resources at a competitive levelised costs of electricity range from 55 to 115 US dollars per megawatt-hour based on 2020 technology costs. Vietnam's experience in solar and wind power development provides relevant implications for the other ASEAN countries. The proposed ASEAN Power Grid could allow for renewable energy transmission from large producers like Vietnam to others within ASEAN.

=== Energy transition ===
Total primary energy supply by fuel (ASEAN, 2020)
1. Oil (32.0%)
2. Coal (26.0%)
3. Natural gas (20.0%)
4. Traditional use of Biomass (5.00%)
5. Renewables (18.0%)

The ASEAN has initiated its transition to cleaner energy sources. This transition is characterised as Demanding, Doable, and Dependent. With approximately 700 million inhabitants, the region is witnessing a substantial surge in energy demand, projected to triple by 2050. However, transitioning energy sources requires significant resources. Southeast Asia would need to invest US$27 billion annually in renewable energy to achieve the target of 23% renewables in the primary energy supply by 2025. Nevertheless, this goal is attainable with the implementation of appropriate policies.

Vietnam serves as a compelling example of rapid adoption of solar and wind energy. Since 2019, Vietnam has emerged as a regional leader, with solar and wind energy accounting for 13% of its electricity mix in 2022, a remarkable increase from nearly zero in 2017. Though, the region requires international assistance to meet its net-zero emission targets. Phasing out coal remains a daunting task, although countries such as Indonesia and Vietnam have pledged to phasing out coal power by 2040s. Several high-profile leaders such as the head of the Indonesian national energy company PLN, Darmawan Prasodjo, have stated that the ASEAN Power Grid proposal is key to unlocking the potential for green energy in southeast Asia.

== Education ==
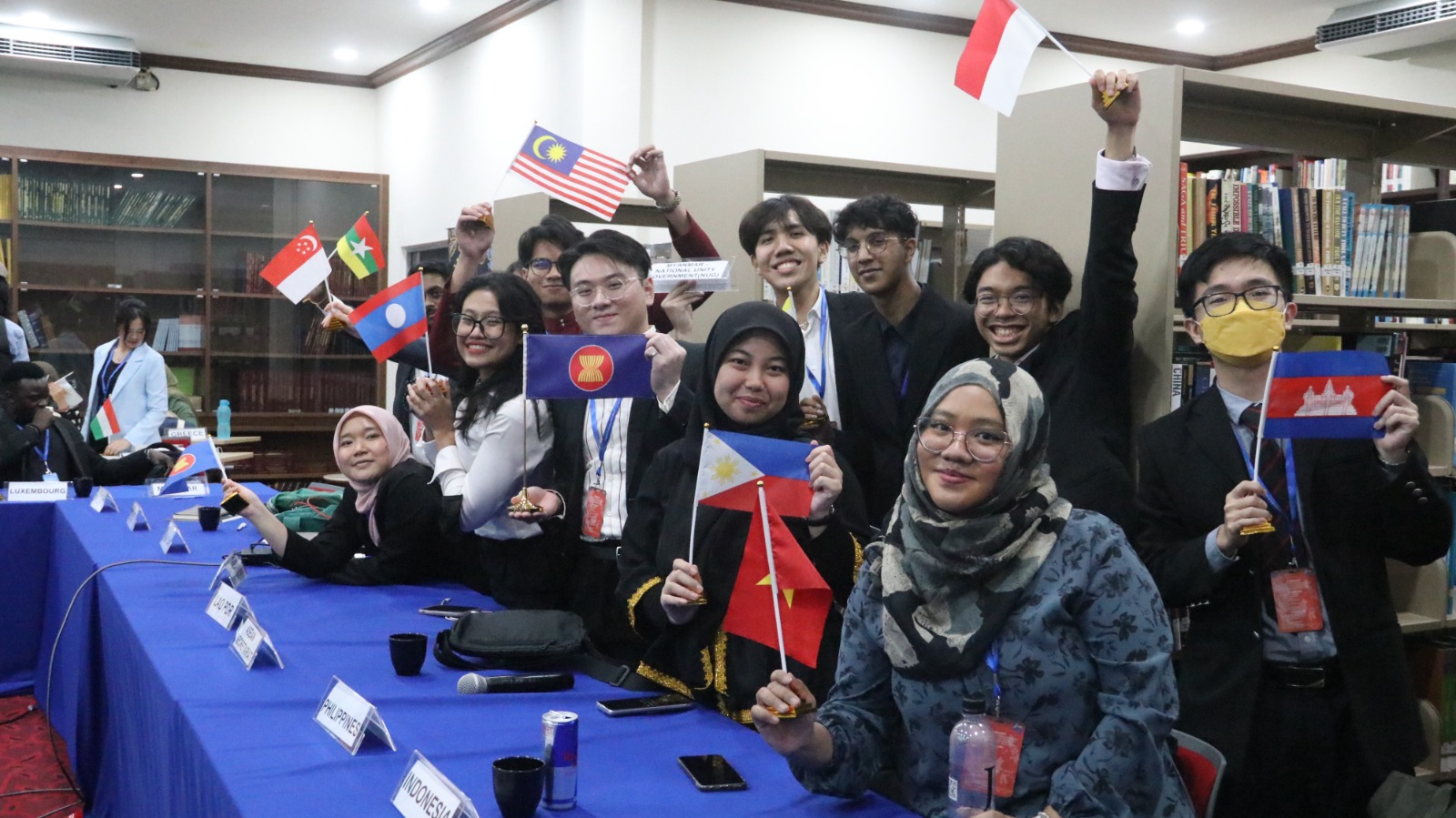
ASEAN Delegation at the EU-ASEAN Youth Diplomat Program 2023 in Faculty of International Relations of University Malaya

To enhance the region's status in education, ASEAN education ministers have agreed four priorities for education at all levels, promoting ASEAN awareness among ASEAN citizens, particularly youth, strengthening ASEAN identity through education, building ASEAN human resources in the field of education strengthening the ASEAN University Network. At the 11th ASEAN Summit in December 2005, leaders set new direction for regional education collaboration when they welcomed the decision of the ASEAN education ministers to convene meetings on a regular basis. The annual ASEAN Education Ministers Meeting oversees co-operation efforts on education at the ministerial level. With regard to implementation, programs, and activities are carried out by the ASEAN Senior Officials on Education (SOM-ED). SOM-ED also manages co-operation on higher education through the ASEAN University Network (AUN). It is a consortium of Southeast Asian tertiary institutions of which 30 currently belong as participating universities. Founded in November 1995 by 11 universities, the AUN was established to: promote co-operation among ASEAN scholars, academics, and scientists, develop academic and professional human resources, promote information dissemination among the ASEAN academic community, enhance awareness of a regional identity and the sense of "ASEAN-ness" among member states.

In November 2011, ten vocational schools and centres were established in China to help develop human resources to assist in the economic and social development of the ASEAN countries.

ASEAN also has a scholarship program offered by Singapore to the 9 other member states for secondary school, junior college, and university education. It covers accommodation, food, medical benefits and accident insurance, school fees, and examination fees. Its recipients, who perform well on the GCE Advanced Level Examination, may apply for ASEAN undergraduate scholarships, which are tailored specifically to undergraduate institutions in Singapore and other ASEAN member countries.

'Australia for ASEAN' scholarships are also offered by the Australian Government to the 'next generation of leaders' from ASEAN member states. By undertaking a Master's degree, recipients are to develop the skills and knowledge to drive change, help build links with Australia, and also participate in the Indo-Pacific Emerging Leaders Program to help develop the ASEAN Outlook for the Indo-Pacific. Each ASEAN member state is able to receive ten 'Australia for ASEAN' scholarships.

=== ASEAN Qualifications Reference Framework ===
The ASEAN Qualifications Reference Framework is the regional qualifications framework developed by the ASEAN and is used by ASEAN member states to link the various national qualifications framework.

The framework was endorsed by the ASEAN Economic Ministers in August 2014; the ASEAN Education Ministers in September 2014; and the ASEAN Labour Ministers through an Ad-referendum from November 2014 to May 2015.

=== National Qualifications Framework of ASEAN Member States ===
ASEAN Members States has established their own national qualifications framework as follows:

Country	National Qualifications Framework	Legal Basis	Reference
Brunei Darussalam	Brunei Darussalam Qualifications Framework (BDQF)		
Cambodia	Cambodia Qualifications Framework (CQF)		
Indonesia	Indonesian Qualifications Framework (IQF)	Presidential Decree no. 8/2012	
Laos	N/A	N/A	
Malaysia	Malaysian Qualifications Framework (MQF)	Malaysian Qualifications Agency (MQA) Act 2007	
Myanmar	National Qualifications Framework (NQF) (Myanmar)		
Philippines	Philippine Qualifications Framework (PQF)	Executive Order No. 83	
Singapore	Workforce Skills Qualifications (WSQ)		
Thailand	National Qualifications Framework (NQF) (Thailand)		
Timor-Leste	Timor-Leste National Qualifications Framework (TLNQF)	Decree-Law of Government No. 36/2011	
Vietnam	Vietnam Qualifications Framework (VQF)	Decision No. 1982/QD-TTg	

=== ASEAN Declaration on Foundational Learning ===
The ASEAN Declaration on Foundational Learning (ADFL) was adopted on the 49th ASEAN Summit upon which the ASEAN Academic Recovery and Catch-Up Program (ARC-UP) creates a mechanism for AMS to share data, resources, and strategies for the ASEAN Work Plan on Education 2026-2030.

== Demographics ==
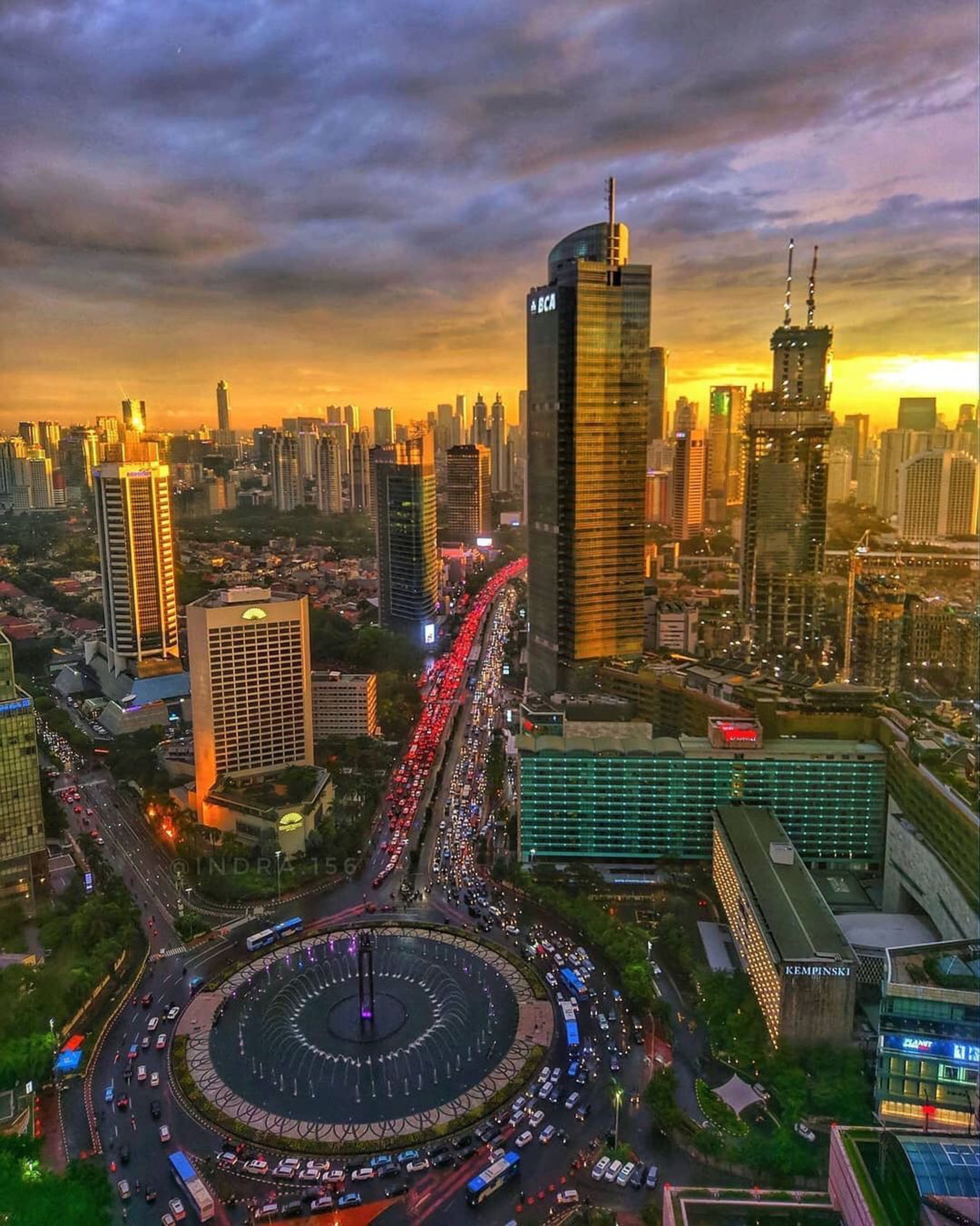
The Jakarta metropolitan area, the largest city in the world, is nicknamed "the capital of ASEAN."

In July 2019, the population of the ASEAN was about 655 million people (8.5% of the world population). In ASEAN in 2019, 55.2 million people were children age 0–4 and 46.3 million people were older than 65. This corresponds to 8.4% and 7.1% of the total ASEAN population. The region's population growth is 1.1% per year. Thailand is the lowest at 0.2% per year, and Cambodia is the highest at 1.9% per year. ASEAN's sex ratio is 99.4 males per 100 females, as of 2017.

=== Urbanisation ===
Just over half (around 50.1%) of Southeast Asia's inhabitants lived in urban areas in 2020, projected to rise to 55.6% in 2030, a total of almost 405 million people. Urbanisation is concentrated in coastal plains and river deltas, giving the region a dense belt of large cities around the Java Sea, South China Sea and Gulf of Thailand. Southeast Asia contains dozens of metropolitan areas with populations of over 1 million; ASEAN data indicate that about 13% of the region's citizens live in 28 cities with more than one million inhabitants, with a further 14% in 367 settlements of between 100,000 and 1 million people.

With a population of roughly 42 million in 2025, Greater Jakarta (Jabodetabek) is the largest metropolitan area in Southeast Asia and one of the largest urban agglomerations in the world, followed by the Greater Manila Area with about 28 million inhabitants. Jakarta and Manila, together with Bangkok, form the three largest metropolitan areas in Southeast Asia and are widely classed as megacities with metropolitan populations exceeding ten million. They are followed by major metropolitan regions centred on Ho Chi Minh City, Singapore, Kuala Lumpur, Hanoi, Surabaya and other large cities across Indonesia, the Philippines, Thailand, Vietnam and Malaysia. The region also contains several polycentric or corridor-type urbanised regions, including the Jakarta–Bandung mega-urban corridor (JBMUR) on Java, the Singapore–Johor Bahru–Batam growth triangle (SIJORI), the extended Bangkok–Eastern Economic Corridor (EEC) along the Gulf of Thailand, and cross-border clusters in the Greater Mekong Subregion and the Brunei–Indonesia–Malaysia–Philippines East ASEAN Growth Area (BIMP–EAGA).

Largest population centres of Southeast Asia metropolitan regions, national censuses 2014–2020
Rank	City name	Country	Pop.	Rank	City name	Country	Pop.
1	Greater Jakarta	Indonesia	31,673,824	11	Singapore	Singapore	5,685,807
2	Greater Manila Area	Philippines	28,250,517	12	Da Nang	Vietnam	5,622,814
3	Ho Chi Minh City metropolitan area	Vietnam	21,281,639	13	Greater Medan	Indonesia	4,756,863
4	Hanoi Capital Region	Vietnam	19,980,000	14	Metro Davao	Philippines	3,339,284
5	Bangkok Metropolitan Region	Thailand	10,696,258	15	Metro Cebu	Philippines	3,165,799
6	Greater Surabaya	Indonesia	9,924,509	16	George Town Conurbation	Malaysia	2,843,344
7	Greater Bandung	Indonesia	8,790,308	17	Makassar metropolitan area	Indonesia	2,725,951
8	Klang Valley	Malaysia	8,455,029	18	Palembang metropolitan area	Indonesia	2,634,501
9	Yangon Region	Myanmar	7,360,703	19	Phnom Penh	Cambodia	2,506,123
10	Semarang metropolitan area	Indonesia	6,009,982	20	Greater Yogyakarta	Indonesia	2,485,163

== Culture ==
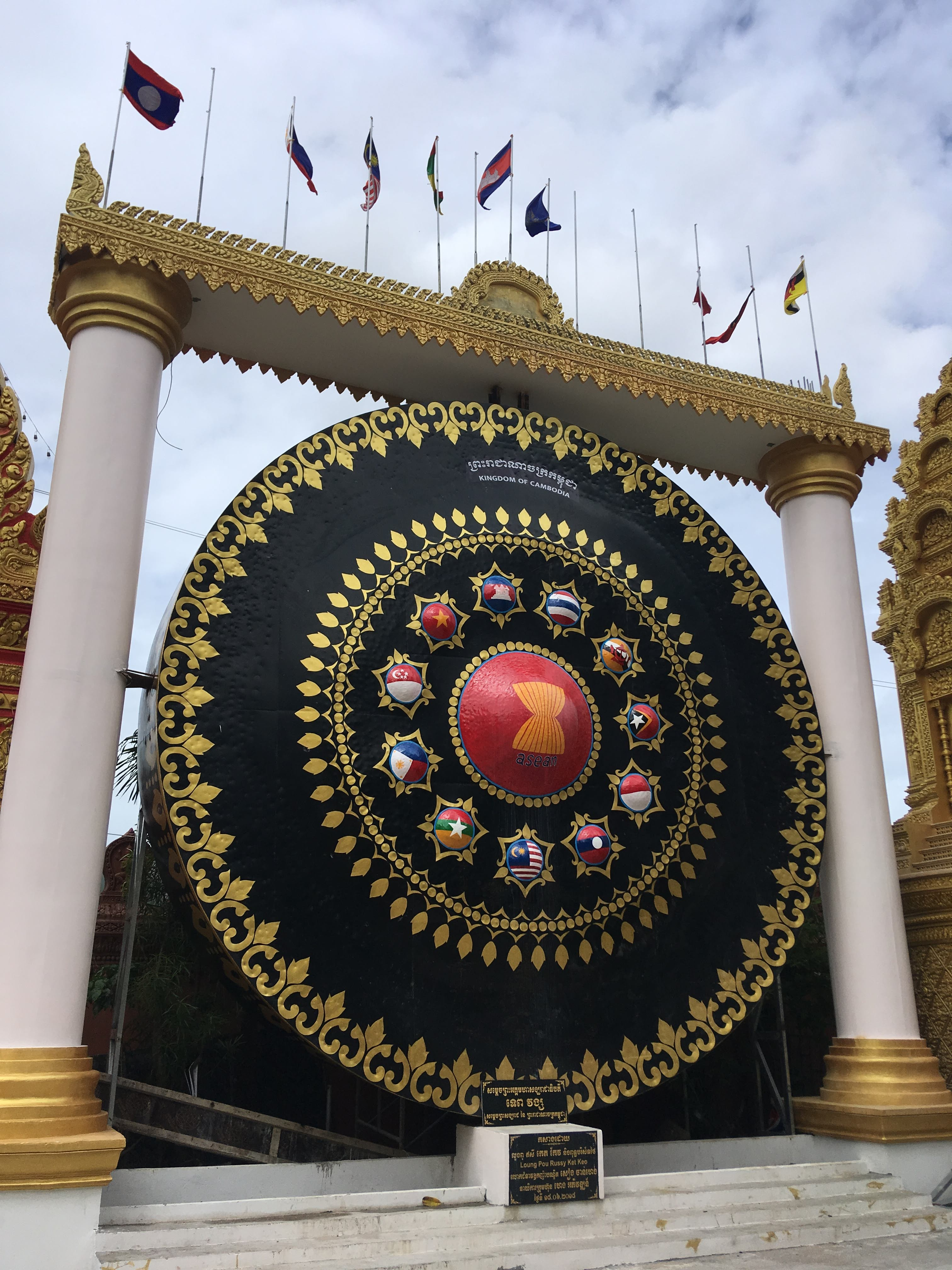
ASEAN ceremonial giant gong at Wat Ounalom Monastery in Phnom Penh, Cambodia

The organisation hosts cultural activities in an attempt to further integrate the region. These include sports and educational activities as well as writing awards. Examples of these include the ASEAN Centre for Biodiversity, ASEAN Heritage Parks and the ASEAN Outstanding Scientist and Technologist Award. In addition, the ASEAN region has been recognised as one of the world's most diverse regions ethnically, religiously and linguistically.

=== Media ===
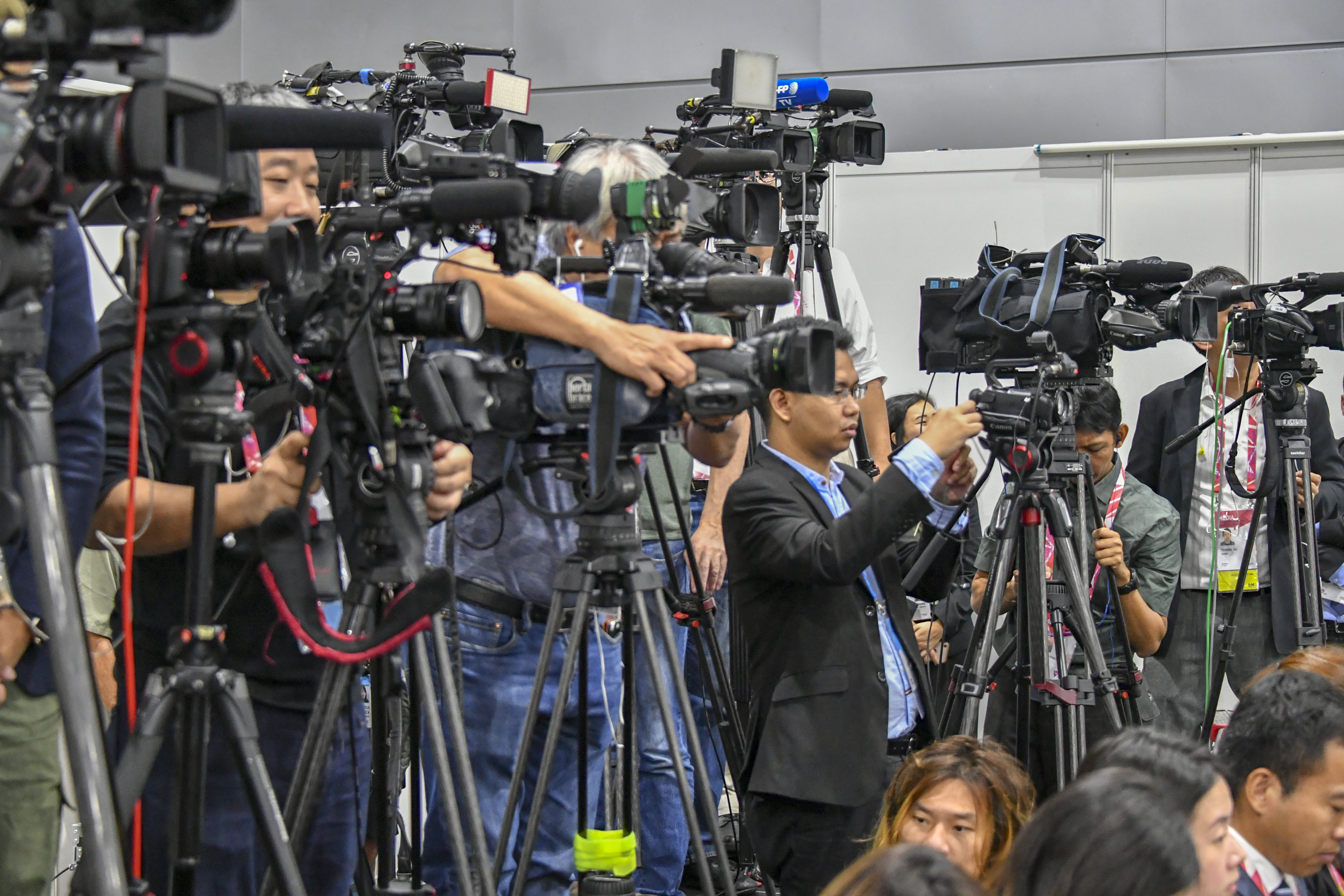
ASEAN 2018 Press Conference in Singapore, cooperative efforts within SEA media was set by ACPM standards

Member states have promoted co-operation in information to help build an ASEAN identity. One of the main bodies in ASEAN co-operation in information is the ASEAN Committee on Culture and Information (COCI). Established in 1978, its mission is to promote effective co-operation in the fields of information, as well as culture, through its various projects and activities. It includes representatives from national institutions like the Ministry of Foreign Affairs, Ministries of Culture and Information, national radio and television networks, museums, archives and libraries, among others. The representatives meet annually to formulate and agree on projects in support of their mission. On 14 November 2014, foreign ministers of member states launched the ASEAN Communication Master Plan (ACPM). It provides a framework for communicating the character, structure, and overall vision of ASEAN and the ASEAN community to key audiences within the region and globally.

ASEAN Media Cooperation (AMC) sets digital television standards and policies in preparation for broadcasters to transition from analogue to digital broadcasting. This collaboration was conceptualised during the 11th ASEAN Ministers Responsible for Information (AMRI) Conference in Malaysia on 1 March 2012 where a consensus declared that both new and traditional media were keys to connecting ASEAN peoples and bridging cultural gaps in the region. Several key initiatives under the AMC include:

- The ASEAN Media Portal was launched 16 November 2007. The portal aims to provide a one-stop site that contains documentaries, games, music videos, and multimedia clips on the culture, arts, and heritage of the ASEAN countries to showcase ASEAN culture and the capabilities of its media industry.
- The ASEAN NewsMaker Project, an initiative launched in 2009, trains students and teachers to produce informational video clips about their countries. The project was initiated by Singapore. Students trained in NewsMaker software, video production, together with developing narrative storytelling skills. Soeung Rathchavy, Deputy Secretary-General of ASEAN for ASEAN Socio-Cultural Community noted that: "Raising ASEAN awareness amongst the youth is part and parcel of our efforts to build the ASEAN Community by 2015. Using ICT and the media, our youths in the region will get to know ASEAN better, deepening their understanding and appreciation of the cultures, social traditions and values in ASEAN."
- The ASEAN Digital Broadcasting Meeting, is an annual forum for ASEAN members to set digital television (DTV) standards and policies, and to discuss progress in the implementation of the blueprint from analogue to digital TV broadcasting by 2020. During the 11th ASEAN Digital Broadcasting Meeting members updated the status on DTV implementation and agreed to inform ASEAN members on the Guidelines for ASEAN Digital Switchover. An issue was raised around the availability and affordability of set-top boxes (STB), thus ASEAN members were asked to make policies to determine funding for STBs, methods of allocation, subsidies and rebates, and other methods for the allocation of STBs. It was also agreed in the meeting to form a task force to develop STB specifications for DVB-T2 to ensure efficiency.
- The ASEAN Post was launched on 8 August 2017 to commemorate ASEAN's 50th Anniversary. It is an independent regional digital media company that is headquartered in Kuala Lumpur, Malaysia. It was founded by former investment banker Rohan Ramakrishnan.

=== Music ===
Music plays a significant role in ASEAN affairs, as evidenced by the new music composed for, and to be performed at, the 34th ASEAN Summit in Bangkok in June 2019.

Since ASEAN's founding, a number of songs have been written for the regional alliance:

- "The ASEAN Way", the official regional anthem of ASEAN. Music by Kittikhun Sodprasert and Sampow Triudom; lyrics by Payom Valaiphatchra.
- "ASEAN Song of Unity" or "ASEAN Hymn". Music by Ryan Cayabyab.
- "Let Us Move Ahead", an ASEAN song. Composed by Candra Darusman.
- "ASEAN Rise", ASEAN's 40th anniversary song. Music by Dick Lee; lyrics by Stefanie Sun.
- "ASEAN Spirit", ASEAN's 50th anniversary song. Composed by Chino Toledo. Lyrics by National Artist for Literature, Rio Alma. Performed by Christian Bautista; video directed by Joaquin Pedro Valdes.

=== Sports ===
The main sporting event of ASEAN is the Southeast Asian Games, a biennial meet of athletes from the eleven member-states.

==== Games events ====
1. SEA Games
1. ASEAN University Games
1. ASEAN School Games
1. ASEAN Para Games

==== Championships events ====
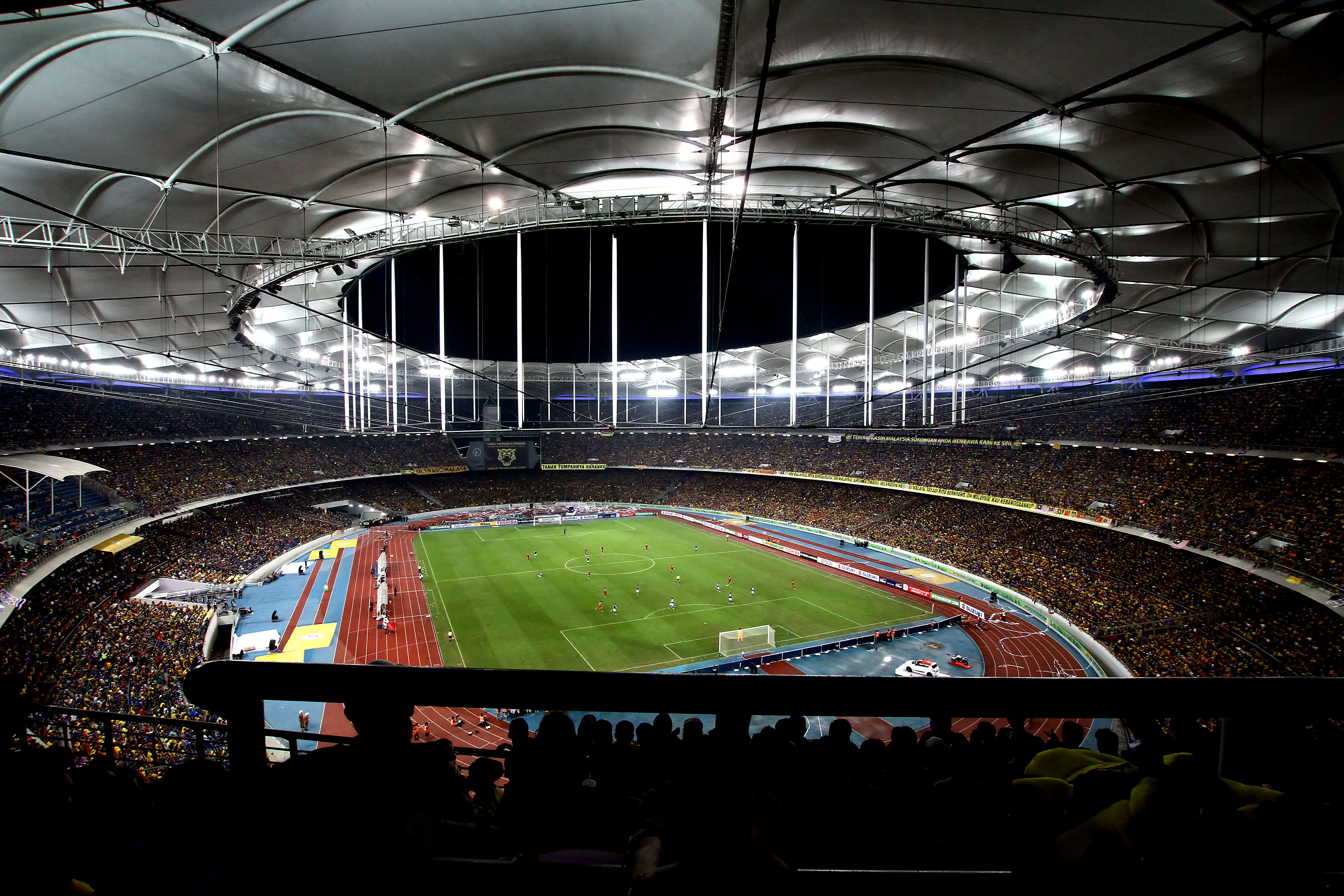
Bukit Jalil National Stadium during the second leg of the 2014 AFF Championship final

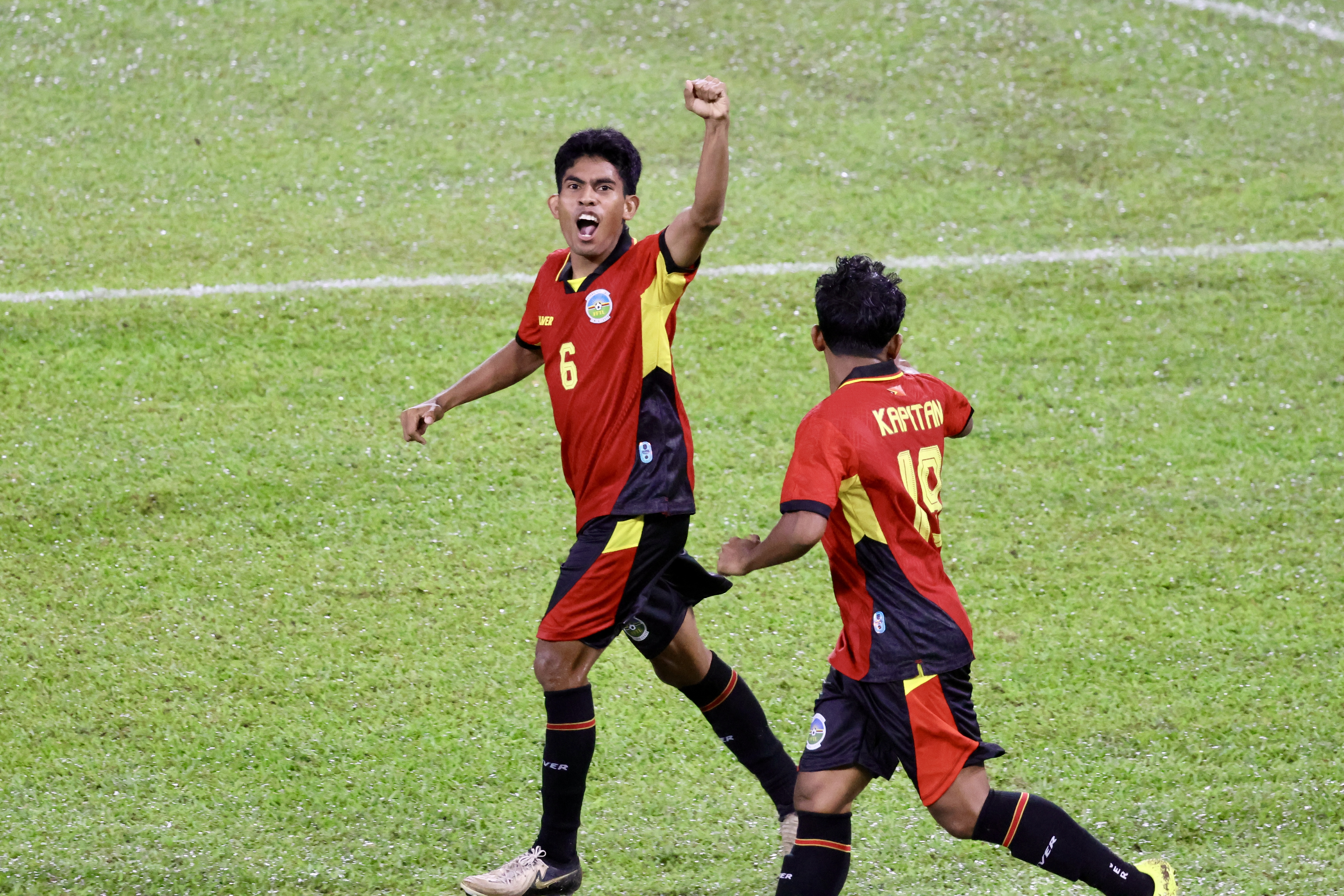
Team Timor-Leste scoring a goal at the 2024 ASEAN Championship

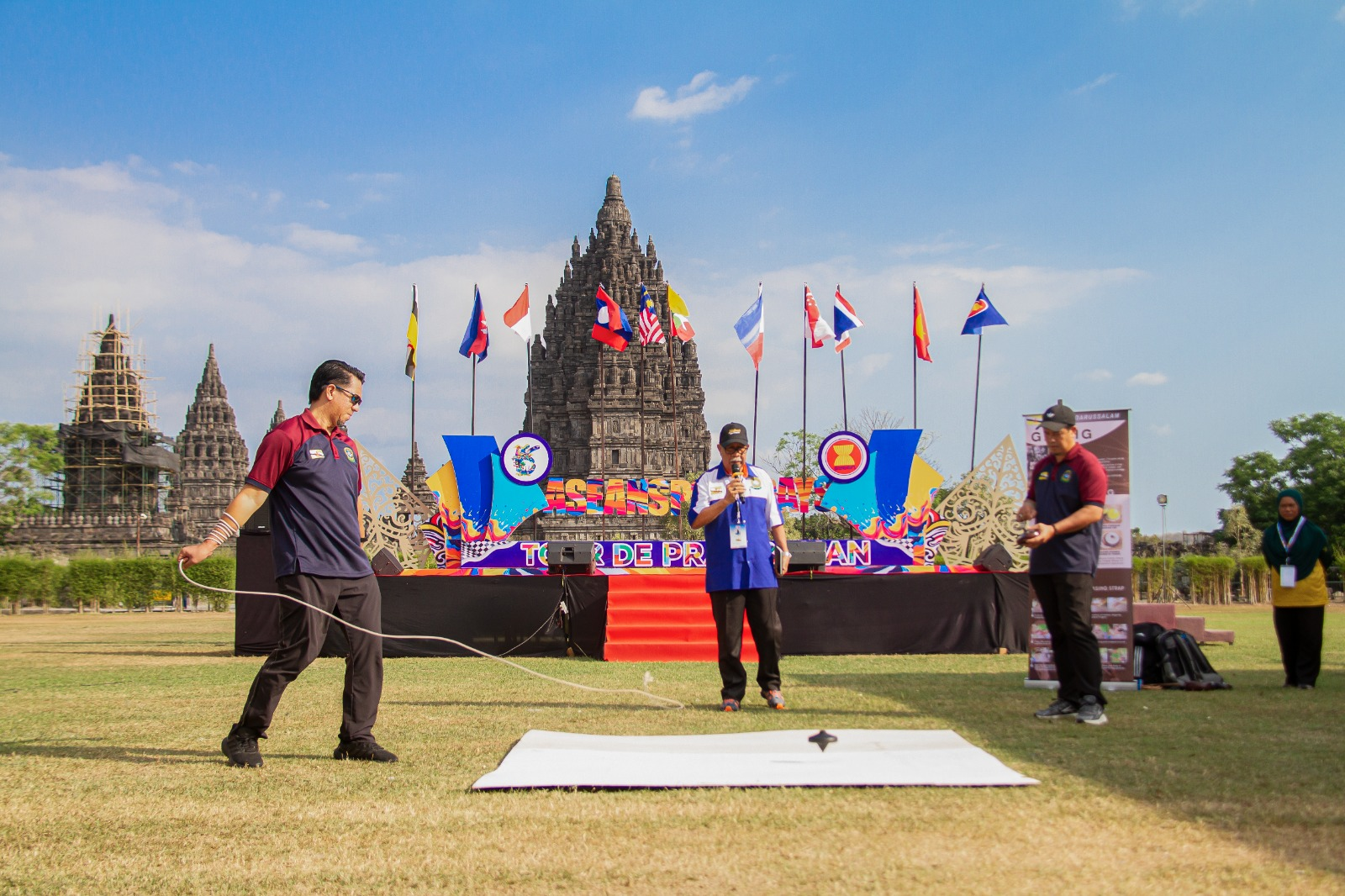
A contingent from Brunei Darussalam playing gasing, in front of Candi Prambanan during ASEAN Sports Day.

1. Southeast Asian Football Championship (ASEAN Championship) – Since 1996
1. Southeast Asian Basketball Championship (SEABA Championship) – Since 1994
1. Southeast Asian Shooting Championship – Since 1967 – South East Asia Shooting Championship – 46th SEASA in 2025 in Chinese Taipei With HKG, TPE and some of JPN and Korea.
1. Southeast Asian Cricket Championship
1. Southeast Asian Handball Championship
1. Southeast Asian Floorball Championships
1. Southeast Asian Hockey Championship
1. Southeast Asian Baseball Championship
1. Southeast Asian Volleyball Championship (SEA V.League) – Since 2019
1. Southeast Asian Sepaktakraw Championship
1. Southeast Asian Footvolley Championship
1. Southeast Asian Youth Athletics Championships
1. Southeast Asian Swimming Championships
1. Southeast Asian Gymnastics Championship
1. Southeast Asian Cycling Championship
1. Southeast Asian Shooting Championship
1. Southeast Asian Archery Championship
1. Southeast Asian Sailing Championship
1. Southeast Asian Rowing Championship
1. Southeast Asian Canoeing Championship
1. Southeast Asian Boxing Championship
1. Southeast Asian Fencing Championship
1. Southeast Asian Kurash Championship
1. Southeast Asian Wrestling Championship
1. Southeast Asian Weightlifting Championship
1. Southeast Asian Powerlifting Championship
1. Southeast Asian Bodybuilding Championship
1. Southeast Asian Judo Championship
1. Southeast Asian Jujitsu Championship
1. Southeast Asian Muaythai Championship
1. Southeast Asian Sambo Championship
1. Southeast Asian Vovinam Championship
1. Southeast Asian Karate Championship
1. Southeast Asian Taekwondo Championship
1. Southeast Asian Wushu Championship
1. Southeast Asian Pencak Silat Championship
1. Southeast Asian Badminton Championship
1. Southeast Asian Tennis Championship
1. Southeast Asian Table Tennis Championships
1. Southeast Asian Squash Championship
1. Southeast Asian Chess Championship
1. Southeast Asian Triathlon Championship
1. Southeast Asian Golf Championship (ASEAN PGA Tour) – Since 2007
1. Southeast Asian Esports Championship
1. Southeast Asian Bowling Championship
1. Southeast Asian Cue Sports Championship
1. Southeast Asian Arnis Championship
1. Southeast Asian Chinlone Championship
1. Southeast Asian Contract Bridge Championship
1. Southeast Asian Bowls Championship
1. Southeast Asian Go Championship
1. Southeast Asian Dragon Boat Championship
1. Southeast Asian Obstacle Racing Championship
1. Southeast Asian Polo Championship
1. Southeast Asian Waterskiing Championship
1. Southeast Asian Woodball Championship
1. Southeast Asian Finswimming Championship
1. Southeast Asian Kun Khmer Championship

== Global influence and reception ==
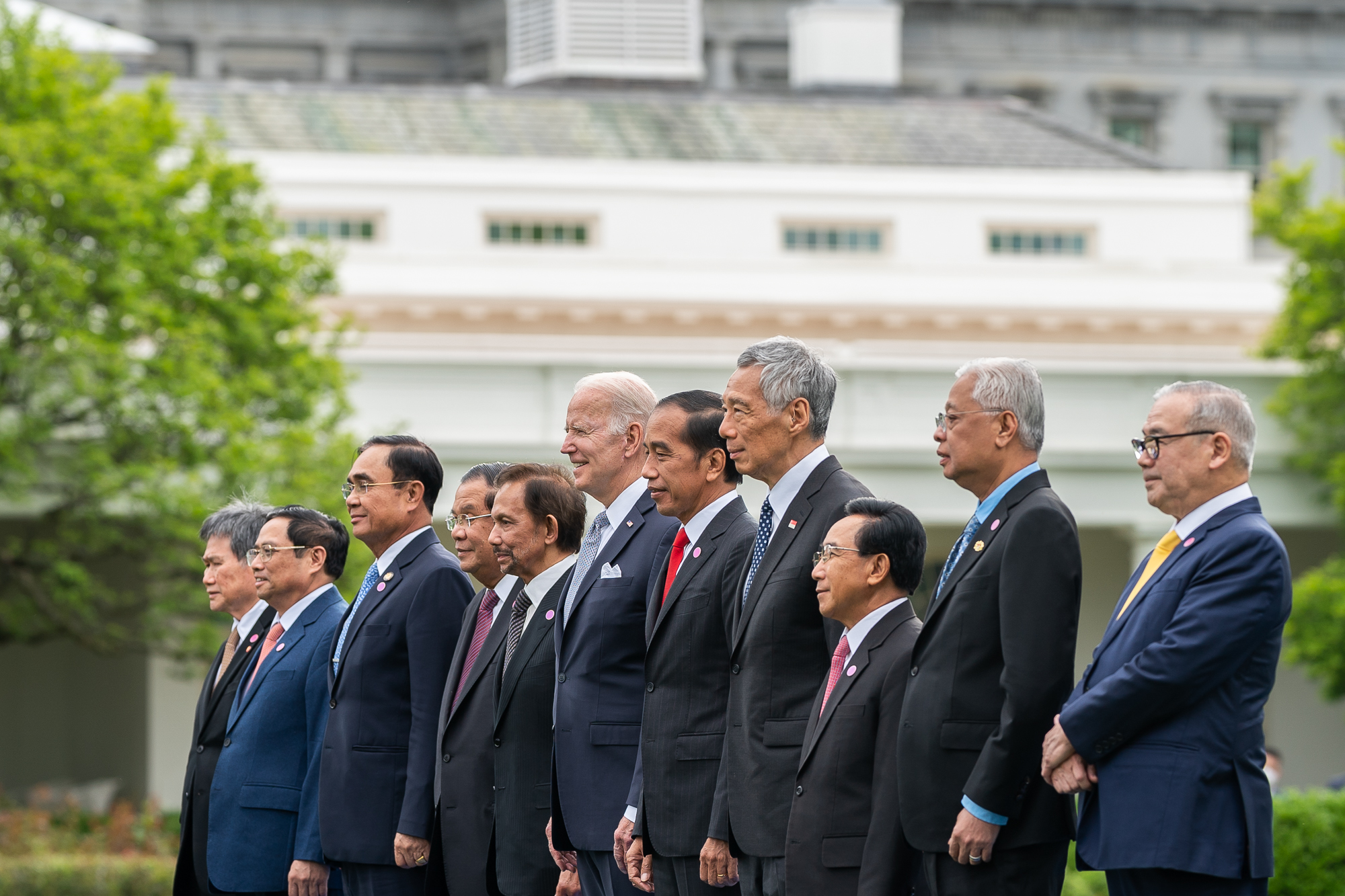
President Joe Biden and ASEAN leaders pose for a family photo at the US-ASEAN Summit

ASEAN has been credited by many as among the world's most influential organisations and a global powerhouse. The organisation plays a role in regional and international diplomacy, politics, security, economy and trade. The ASEAN Free Trade Area also stands as one of the largest and most important free trade areas in the world, and, together with its network of dialogue partners, some of the world's largest multilateral forums and blocs, including APEC, EAS and RCEP. Being one of the world's foremost political, economic and security meetings, the ASEAN Summit serves as a prominent regional (Asia) and international (worldwide) conference, with world leaders attending its related summits and meetings to discuss various problems and global issues, strengthening cooperation, and making decisions.

Critics have charged ASEAN with weakly promoting human rights and democracy, particularly in junta-led Myanmar. Some scholars think that non-interference has hindered ASEAN efforts to handle the Myanmar issue, human rights abuse, and haze pollution in the area. Despite global outrage at the military crack-down on unarmed protesters in Yangon, ASEAN has refused to suspend Myanmar as a member and also rejects proposals for economic sanctions. This has caused concern as the European Union has refused to conduct free trade negotiations at the regional level for these political reasons. During a UN vote against the ethnic cleansing of Rohingya, most member states voted to either abstain or against the condemnation. Only the Muslim-majority countries Malaysia, Indonesia, and Brunei voted to condemn the cleansing of Rohingya. Some international observers view ASEAN as a "talk shop", stating that the organisation is: "big on words, but small on action". "ASEAN policies have proven to be mostly rhetoric, rather than actual implementation", according to Pokpong Lawansiri, a Bangkok-based independent analyst of ASEAN. "It has been noted that less than 50% of ASEAN agreements are actually implemented, while ASEAN holds more than six hundred meetings annually".

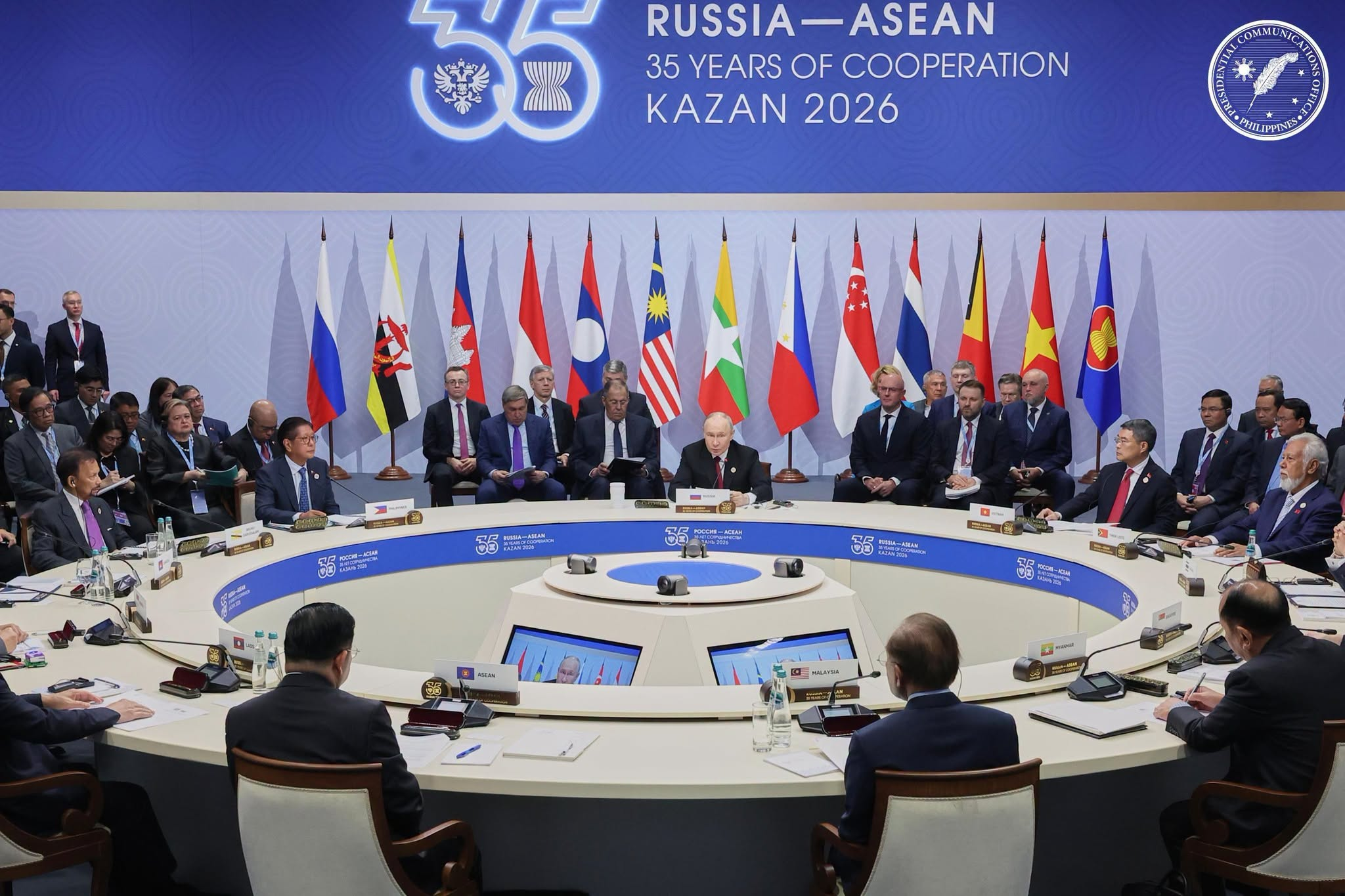
Russian President Vladimir Putin and ASEAN leaders during the ASEAN–Russia Commemorative Summit in Kazan, Russia, 18 June 2026

The head of the International Institute of Strategic Studies, Tim Huxley, cites the diverse political systems present in the grouping, including many young states, as a barrier to far-reaching co-operation beyond economics. He also asserts that, without an external threat to rally against after the Cold War ended, ASEAN has less successfully restrained its members and resolved such border disputes as those between Myanmar and Thailand or Indonesia and Malaysia. During the 12th ASEAN Summit in Cebu, several activist groups staged anti-globalisation protests, arguing that the agenda of economic integration would negatively affect industries in the Philippines and would deprive thousands of Filipinos of their jobs.

Corruption remains a widespread issue, as "tea money" remains an important requirement to grease business transactions and to receive public services. Following the release of the Corruption Perceptions Index 2015 by Berlin-based graft watchdog Transparency International on 27 January, its Asia–Pacific director, Srirak Plipat, noted that: "if there was one common challenge to unite the Asia-Pacific region, it would be corruption", noting that: "from campaign pledges to media coverage to civil society forums, corruption dominates the discussion. Yet despite all this talk, there's little sign of action."

=== Economic integration ===
The group's integration plan has raised concerns, in particular, the 2015 deadline. Business and economy experts who attended the Lippo-UPH Dialogue in Naypyidaw cited unresolved issues relating to aviation, agriculture, and human resources. Some panelists, among them, Kishore Mahbubani, warned against high expectations at the onset. He stated: "Please do not expect a big bang event in 2015 where everything is going to happen overnight when the ASEAN Economic Community comes into being. We've made progress in some areas and unfortunately regressed in some areas."

Some panelists enumerated other matters to be dealt with for a successful launch. Among them were the communications issues involving the 600 million citizens living in the region, increasing understanding in business, current visa arrangements, demand for specific skills, banking connections, and economic differences. Former Philippine National Statistical Coordination Board (NSCB) Secretary General Romulo A. Virola, said in 2012 that the Philippines seems unready to benefit from the integration due to its "wobbly" economic performance compared to other member states. According to Virola, the Philippines continues to lag behind in terms of employment rate, tourism, life expectancy, and cellular subscriptions. Nestor Tan, head of BDO Unibank Inc., said that while some businesses see the Asian Economic Blueprint (AEC) as an opportunity, the integration would be more of a threat to local firms. Tan added that protecting the Philippines' agricultural and financial services sectors, as well as the labour sector, would be necessary for the implementation of AEC by 2015. Standard & Poor's also believed that banks in the Philippines are not yet prepared for the tougher competition that would result from the integration. In one of its latest publications, S&P said banks in the country, although profitable and stable, operate on a much smaller scale than their counterparts in the region.

The US Chamber of Commerce has highlighted widespread concern that the much-anticipated AEC could not be launched by the 2015 deadline. In January 2014, former ASEAN Secretary-General Rodolfo C. Severino, wrote: "while ASEAN should not be condemned for its members' failure to make good on their commitments, any failure to deliver will likely lead to a loss of credibility and could mean that member states fall further behind in the global competition for export markets and foreign direct investment (FDI)". In 2012, the commencement of the AEC was postponed to 31 December 2015 from the original plan of 1 January. Despite Secretary-General Surin Pitsuwan's firm reassurance that "[t]here will be no more delays and that all ten ASEAN countries will participate", even the most fervent proponents of AEC worried that AEC would not be delivered on time as December 2015 neared.

An article published by Vietnam News echoed some of the challenges and opportunities that Vietnam faces in preparation for the AEC. The article said that the deputy head of the Ministry of Industry and Trade, Tran Thanh Hai, was concerned about local enterprises' lack of knowledge of the AEC. It was said that 80% of local enterprises surveyed acknowledged that they have little information about the interests and challenges available for them in the ASEAN market. The article also noted that the general secretary of the Vietnam Steel Association, Chu Duc Khai, said that most of the local steel making enterprises lack information about doing business in the ASEAN market; they have not had a chance to study it, and have only exported small amounts of steel to ASEAN countries. Another challenge is the need to compete with other countries in the ASEAN market to export raw products since the country had mainly exported raw products. The Asian Development Bank also has doubts about Cambodia's ability to meet the AEC deadline. The leading economist of ADB, Jayant Menon, said that Cambodia needs to speed up its customs reform and to press ahead with automating processes to reduce trade costs and minimise the opportunities for corruption and be ready for the implementation of its National Single Window by 2015.

Despite an ASEAN Economic Community goal of significant economic integration as laid out in the AEC Blueprint 2025, ASEAN continues to face challenges towards integration. A report published by the Asian Trade Centre in 2019 identified multiple sectors that face challenges towards integration due to non-tariff barriers that still exist in the region. The report stated that the goals of the AEC 2025 would not be accomplished if ASEAN fails to address the issues of non-tariff measures and eliminate non-tariff barriers in the region.

== Security ==
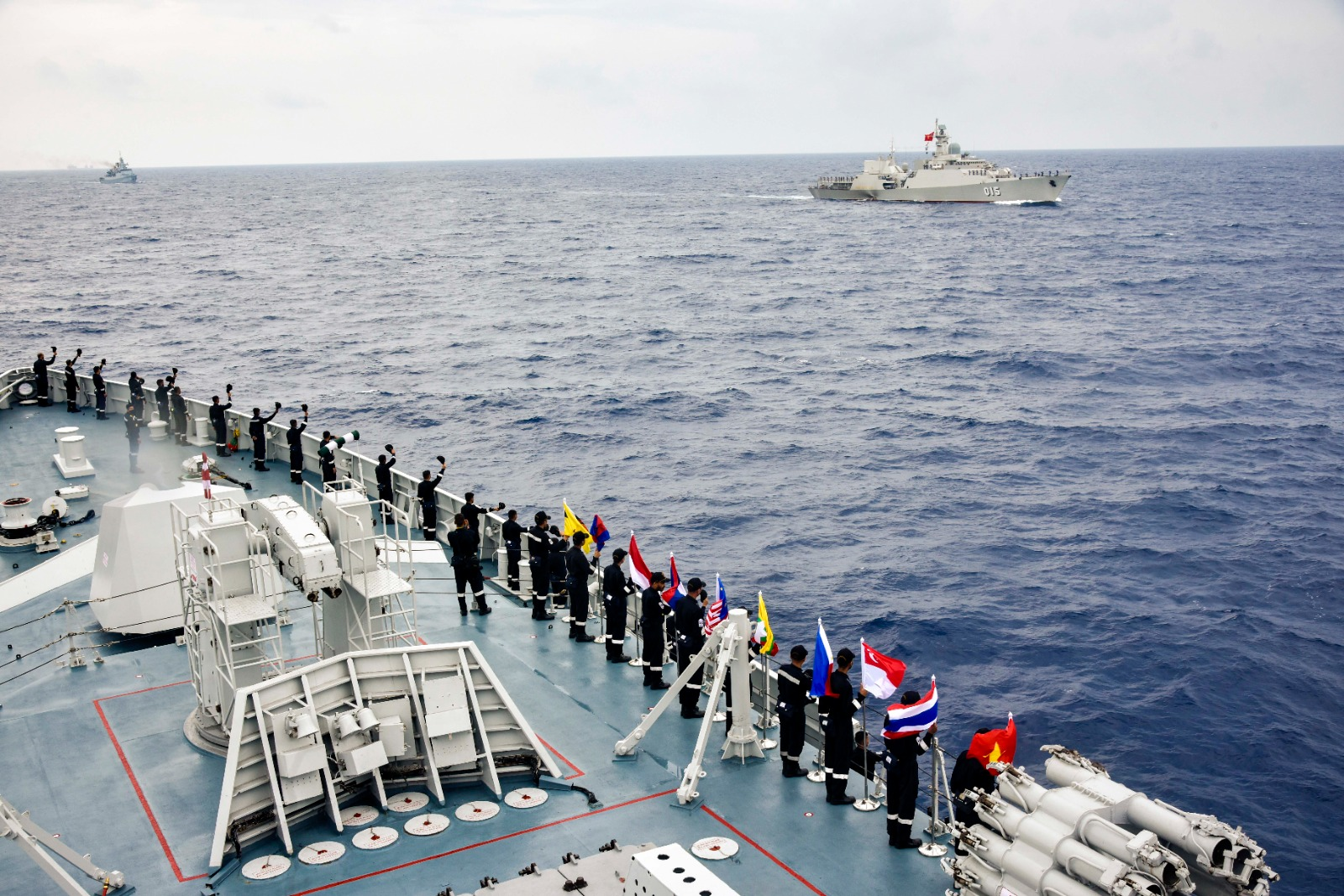
Greeting between two naval fleets in the South China Sea during the ASEAN-India Maritime Exercise, 8 May 2023

ASEAN is recognised by its members to be one of the main forums to discuss security issues; based on the principles in its charter, its main aim is to provide an environment of common understanding and cooperation between the member states to "respond effectively to all forms of threats, transitional crimes and transboundary challenges". Accordingly, ASEAN has embraced the idea of cooperative security which means that ASEAN's approach to security issues is through confidence-building measures and transparency for reducing the tension and conflict between its members. Security policies and plans are concerted by the ASEAN Political-Security Community to envision "a concert of Southeast Asian nations, outward looking, living in peace, stability and prosperity, bonded together in partnership in dynamic development and in a community of caring societies."

=== Piracy ===
Piracy in the Strait of Malacca and in the Sulu and Celebes Sea is one of the main non-traditional security threats for the region, it has challenged the capacity of its members to ensure coordination of effective policy actions to reduce this phenomenon. As highlighted by the ReCAAP report of 2020: "The increase of incidents (in Asia) during January–June 2020 occurred in Bangladesh, India, Indonesia, the Philippines, Vietnam, South China Sea and Singapore Strait." The increment of incidents during 2020, have raised alerts in the region as the phenomenon of piracy could be fostered by the social consequences of the COVID-19 pandemic, in their Fourteenth Asean Ministerial Meeting On Transnational Crime the ministers agreed that ASEAN should embrace a greater commitment to strengthen the measures in combating transnational crime in the context of the pandemic. Despite this statement, ASEAN has not updated their plans for combating piracy, although member states created and enforced the Maritime Security Plan of Action 2018-2020, to address the national legal enforcement capacities and creating a common protocol of action to counter piracy allowing the region to cooperate for ensuring the security of the Pacific Ocean, new discussions and agendas for new measures has not been enforced yet.

Accordingly, this plan reinforces the necessity to secure the seas due to the importance of this region geographical and economically, its strategic position as the main link between the Indian and the Pacific Ocean and the region serving as the main passage that connects middle east economies and India with China, Japan, South Korea and Australia. This plan is mainly focused in three priorities:

1. Shared Awareness and exchange of best practices.
1. Confidence building measures based on international and regional legal frameworks, arrangements and cooperation.
1. Capacity building and enhancing cooperation of maritime law enforcement agencies in the region.

In this sense, spread all over the countries of Southeast Asia, criminal organisations with complex structures pose a challenge to ASEAN's coordination capacity to solve the problem despite the plans created within its institutional framework. Although some measures have been implemented by ASEAN, still the complexity of the problem requires deep solutions of cooperation that might alter the balance of its framework. The maritime security plans for the region are based on the ASEAN idea of political-security community; the two main objectives of the APSC are: "to accelerate the economic growth, social progress and cultural development by promoting an identity of equality and partnership as the main foundations of peace and prosperity". Additionally, the APSC promotes "regional peace and stability through abiding respect for justice and the rule of law in the relationship among countries of the region and adherence to the principles of the United Nations Charter".

Nonetheless, the institutional framework and decision-making procedures in ASEAN make difficult to reach agreements on piracy. ASEAN has struggled to deliver a coordinated response to solve this problem in the region mainly by two reasons: the first one, could be related to the focalised nature of the problem in subregions rather than the whole region. Consequently, this focalisation generates that the discussions in the main forums (The ASEAN maritime forum (AMF) and Maritime Security Expert Working Group (MSEWG)) have not resulted in actual measures that tackle piracy and involve all member states as major consensus should be reached to enforce them. One example of this, is the possibility discussed by the 10 ASEAN member states to create a joint ASEAN navy in 2015 to carry on operations in one of the piracy hotspots in the region, the strait of Malacca, this proposal ended up being enforced by bilateral/sub-regional efforts rather than in the ASEAN framework (see ReCAAP for further information). The second one, consensus on non-traditional security issues has been difficult to reach due to contradictory interest between member states, particularly in joint operations between navies and the reach of these joint operations. These issues are generated mainly by unresolved territorial disputes, specially in the maritime domain, at some extent they pose a challenge to ASEAN members in their capacity to cooperate in regards to the maritime security approach.

Consequently, a greater multilateral cooperation has been pushed by the members to solve the piracy challenges on economy, trading and security. Members of the ASEAN, have addressed the necessity for the regional organisation to make some concessions and rearrangements to respond to the challenges that non-traditional security (specifically piracy) issues posse to the security of the ASEAN members. Despite the efforts and plans made by the ASEAN, this organisation is expected to overcome the image of being regarded solely as a forum to discuss security issues. Two possible solutions has been proposed by some member states for this purpose: 1. Promoting relationships with other major actors regionally to overcome the short-time challenges and 2. Rearrange the institutional framework to "avoid contention and seek cooperation to maximize the aggregate ability in order to benefit from making the sea fulfil its economic, security and other goals".

=== Future Security Framework ===
In addition to piracy, there are several significant issues facing ASEAN today, including human rights violations, repression, and democratic backsliding. Across the region, various political leaders are known human rights abusers, however there is no proper accountability process, and often human rights violations are sidelined by economic or political interests. Myanmar is in the midst of a devastating civil war, during which the military government that was installed following a coup d'état, has carried out human rights violations against the Rohingya population.

=== Regional Concerns About Thailand ===
Political instability in Thailand, particularly due to recurring military involvement in government, has raised concerns within ASEAN about regional stability. Since the 2006 coup, Thailand has experienced multiple military interventions in politics, including the 2014 coup led by General Prayuth Chan-ocha, which resulted in nearly a decade of military-backed governance.

Observers note that Thailand's military dominance has complicated ASEAN's ability to respond cohesively to regional challenges. Domestic instability has at times influenced its foreign policy stance, affecting negotiations on security cooperation and regional humanitarian crises.

=== AMNEX ===
The navies of ASEAN member countries participate in the different editions of the ASEAN Multilateral Naval Exercise, or AMNEX.

== See also ==
- ASEAN Smart Cities Network
- ASEAN Commission on the Promotion and Protection of the Rights of Women
- ASEAN Common Time
- ASEAN-India Car Rally 2012
- ASEAN Sculpture Garden
- ASEAN Power Grid
- Secondary language of ASEAN
- Asian Monetary Unit
- Asia Pacific Forum
- Blue card system – ASEAN motor insurance scheme
- Comprehensive Economic Partnership for East Asia
- Congress of Southeast Asian Librarians
- List of ASEAN countries by GDP
- List of country groupings
- List of largest trading partners of ASEAN
- List of multilateral free-trade agreements
- Mekong-Ganga Cooperation
- musyawarah-mufakat
- Pan-Asianism
- Regional Comprehensive Economic Partnership
- Southeast Asia Treaty Organisation
