= 2026 ASEAN Summits =

ASEAN diplomatic conference in the Philippines

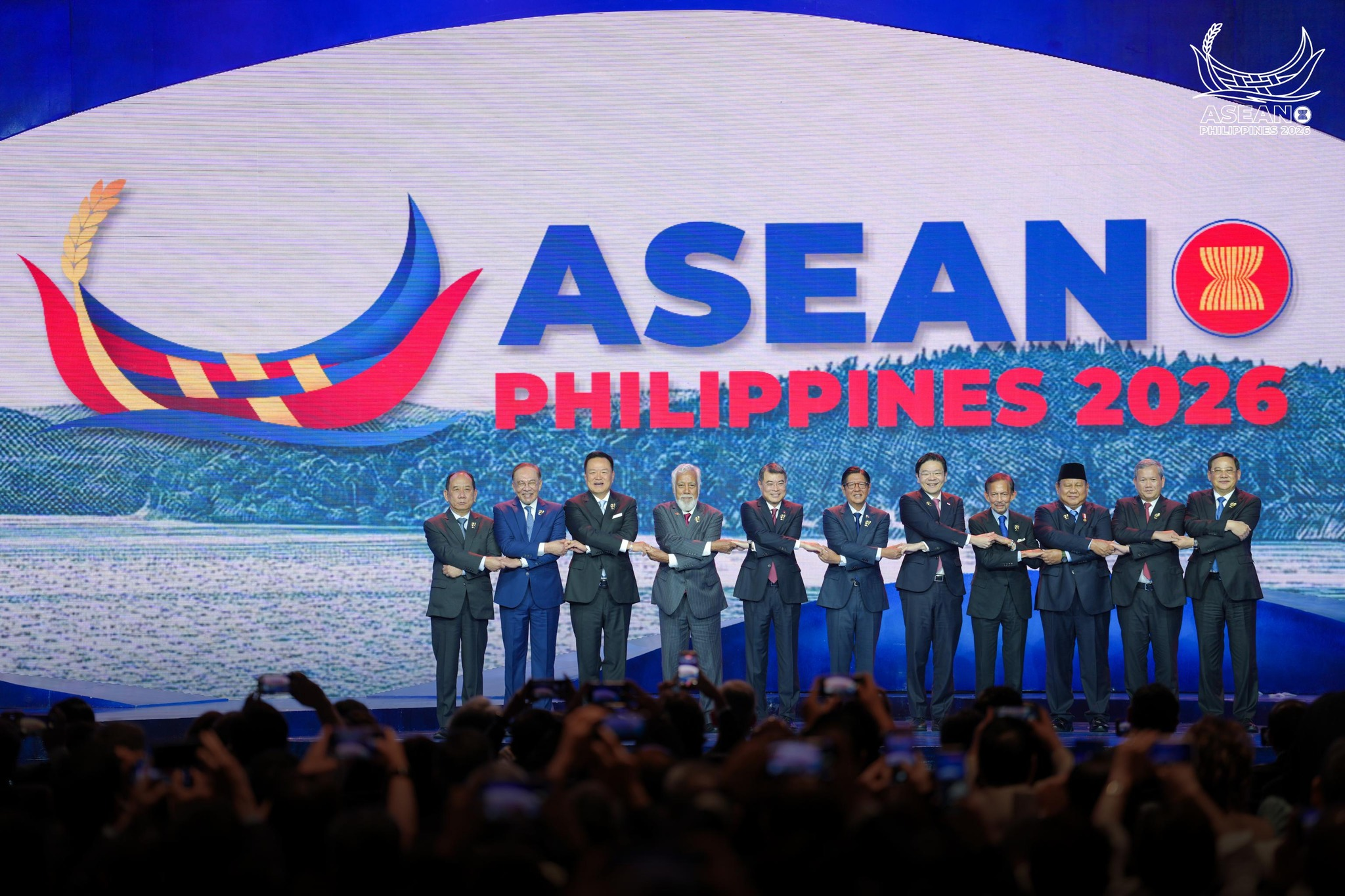
ASEAN leaders gather in Cebu for the 48th ASEAN Summit.

The 2026 ASEAN Summits were a series of two diplomatic conferences centering on the Association of Southeast Asian Nations (ASEAN), which were held in the Philippines in 2026. It comprised the 48th ASEAN Summit held on May 6–8 in Cebu and the 49th ASEAN Summit held on November 15–17 in Metro Manila.

The Philippines hosted the summits as the ASEAN chair for 2026 after Myanmar, which was due for the chairmanship through ASEAN's alphabetical ordering, skipped due to the country's ongoing civil war.

The ASEAN chairmanship of the Philippines, led by President Bongbong Marcos, saw ASEAN hold its first meeting with Myanmar since 2021, after the country was excluded for failing to implement the five-point consensus laid out by the association to resolve the conflict in the country. On June 17–18, the Russia–ASEAN special summit in Kazan, Russia, was attended by Southeast Asian heads of state and President Vladimir Putin. The summit centered on the ASEAN Power Grid, including the possibility of cooperation in civilian nuclear energy.

== 48th ASEAN Summit ==
2026 ASEAN Summits 48th ASEAN Summit
- Plenary session
- Host country: Philippines
- Date: May 6–8, 2026
- Cities: Lapu-Lapu City, Cebu
- Venues: Mactan Expo
- Participants: ASEAN members
- Chair: President Bongbong Marcos
- Follows: 2025 ASEAN Summits
- Precedes: 2027 ASEAN Summits

The 48th ASEAN Summit and related meetings was held in May 6–8, 2026 at the newly opened Mactan Expo in the Mactan Newtown district of Lapu-Lapu City in Cebu. At the sidelines of the summit, a special meeting for the Brunei Darussalam-Indonesia-Malaysia-Philippines East ASEAN Growth Area (BIMP-EAGA) was also held.

During the summit, the bloc laid plans to prioritize the digital transformation of the member countries' small and medium enterprises through artificial intelligence, and pursuing a green energy strategy to achieve carbon neutrality. The ASEAN announced the establishment of a maritime center in the Philippines after adopting a declaration on maritime cooperation. The initiative aims to strengthen multilateral coordination on maritime issues in the region, including the issues in South China Sea.

**ASEAN members** Host state and leader are shown in bold text.
Member	Represented by	Title
Brunei	Hassanal Bolkiah	Sultan
Cambodia	Hun Manet	Prime Minister
Indonesia	Prabowo Subianto	President
Laos	Sonexay Siphandone	Prime Minister
Malaysia	Anwar Ibrahim	Prime Minister
Myanmar	U Hau Khan Sum	Permanent Secretary of Ministry of Foreign Affairs
**Philippines**	**Bongbong Marcos**	**President**
Singapore	Lawrence Wong	Prime Minister
Thailand	Anutin Charnvirakul	Prime Minister
Timor Leste	Xanana Gusmão	Prime Minister
Vietnam	Lê Minh Hưng	Prime Minister

On May 7, summit chair Bongbong Marcos held a private trilateral meeting in Cebu with Cambodian prime minister Hun Manet and Thai counterpart Anutin Charnvirakul over the Cambodian–Thai border disputes. This comes after Thailand's cabinet had terminated a 25-year-old Memorandum of Agreement between then-prime ministers Thaksin Shinawatra and Hun Sen also known as Memorandum 44 (MOU 44) that managed the ambiguity without resolving the said issue. The outcome of the trilateral meeting according to a Thai government spokesperson said that the meeting was "constructive, frank, and forward-looking" which was followed up by the commitments of both Cambodia and Thailand to work on immediate confidence-building measures to rebuild trust and dialogue.

On May 8, the leaders of ASEAN agreed upon the adoption of the Cebu Protocol, a charter amendment focused on the formalization of Timor-Leste's membership in ASEAN which was signed and approved on October 28, 2025, in Malaysia. The Cebu Protocol was the first amendment to the ASEAN Charter since its signing in 2007.

Following the first summit of the year, on May 14, the leaders of ASEAN had begun a slow but progressive approach to the rapprochement of Myanmar into the daily legal affairs of the alliance since the 2021 Myanmar coup d'état that deposed democratically-elected caretaker and subsequently imprisoned peace advocate Aung San Suu Kyi. Myanmar's government had begun constructive and engineered elections in early-2026 to legitimize the "pseudo-civilian government" led by elected president Min Aung Hlaing. Notable actions made by Myanmar to improve its international standings occurred on May 1 when former leader Aung San Suu Kyi was moved to house arrest. Thailand has been the strongest advocate for Myanmar's rapprochement, urging member-states to accept the electoral result of the nation however, Indonesia, Malaysia, and the Philippines remain hesitant to accept the terms due to the ongoing civil war in most of the country.

Protesters held rallies to urge ASEAN heads to address the region's fossil fuel dependence and plastic pollution crisis.

== 49th ASEAN Summit ==
2026 ASEAN Summits 49th ASEAN Summit
- ASEAN leaders during the opening ceremony
- Host country: Philippines
- Date: November 15–17, 2026
- Cities: Metro Manila
- Venues: Philippine International Convention Center, Coconut Palace (retreat session)
- Participants: ASEAN members Guest invitees (see below)
- Chair: President Bongbong Marcos
- Follows: 2025 ASEAN Summits
- Precedes: 2027 ASEAN Summits

The 49th ASEAN Summit and related meetings was held on November 15–17 at various venues across Metro Manila, primarily at the Philippine International Convention Center (PICC) in Pasay.

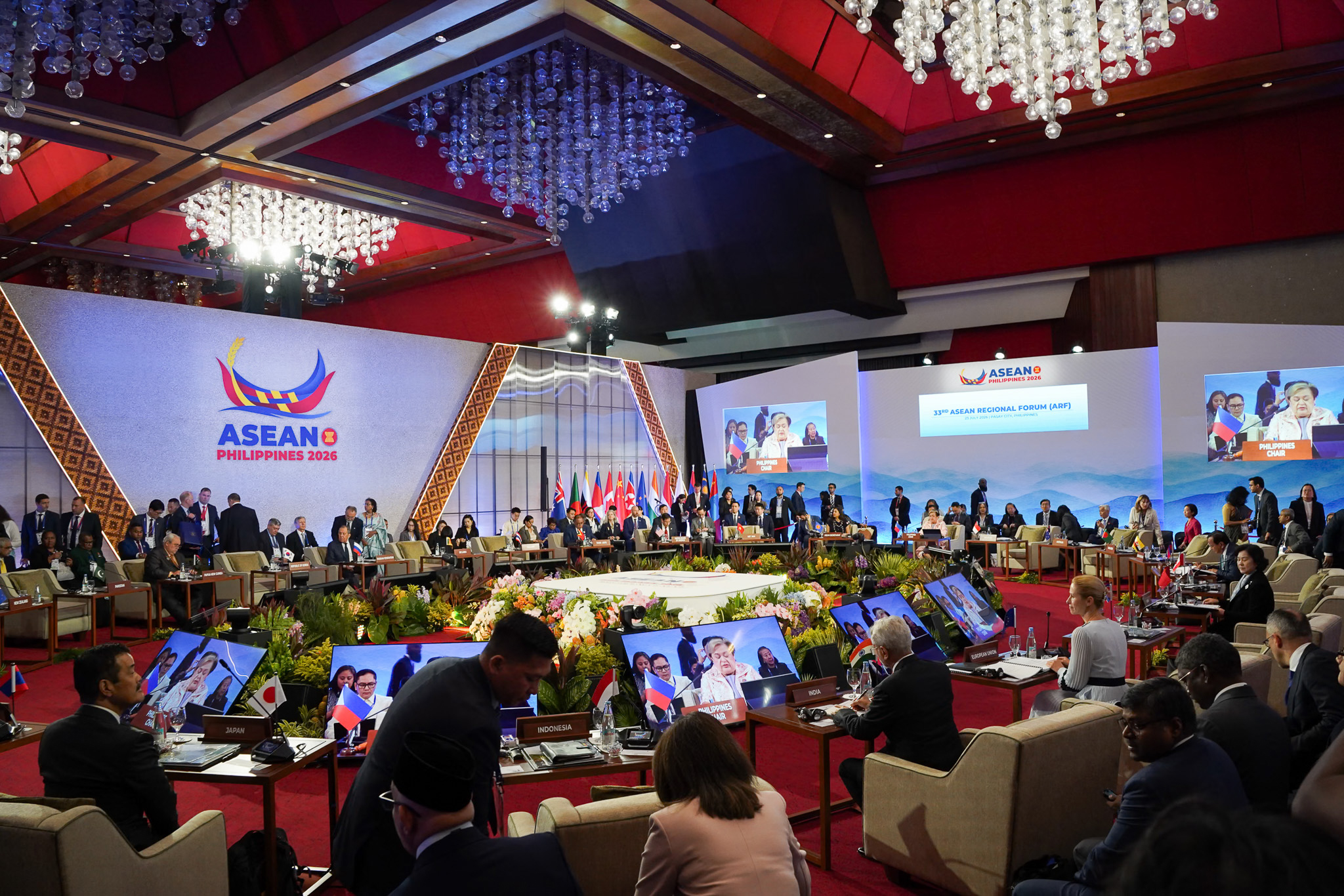
The ASEAN Foreign Ministers meeting was held at the newly restored Philippine International Convention Center prior to the 49th ASEAN Meeting.

Ahead of the summit, the 59th ASEAN Foreign Ministers Meeting (AMM) for 2026 took place at the PICC on July 18–24, 2026, chaired by Foreign Affairs Secretary Tess Lazaro. She also chaired related summit meetings, including the East Asia Summit Foreign Ministers' Meeting and the ASEAN Regional Forum Ministers' Meeting. Lazaro also hosted a gala dinner for the foreign ministers and their delegations at the Museo del Galeón on July 21.

To facilitate security and traffic management across Metro Manila during the summit, the Philippine government declared non-working holidays on the days of the summit, implemented road closures and flight adjustments, and deployed heightened security measures around the PICC.

On November 14, 2026, ASEAN economic and commerce ministers signed the Digital Economy Framework Agreement (DEFA) ahead of the summit. DEFA establishes a regional framework covering digital trade, electronic payments, cross-border dataflows, and cybersecurity, with implementation expected to begin in 2027.

A code of conduct in the South China Sea was expected to be finalized at the summit. However, on November 15, Secretary Lazaro announced that ASEAN and China had not concluded negotiations on the code of conduct. According to Lazaro, the parties had provisionally agreed on approximately 80% of the draft, but several issues remained unresolved, including whether the code would be legally binding. Negotiations are expected to continue under Singapore's ASEAN chairmanship in 2027.

On November 15, ASEAN unveiled an updated flag and emblem featuring 11 rice stalks to represent the accession of Timor-Leste as its eleventh member. The changes followed the entry into force of the Cebu Protocol, adopted during the 48th ASEAN Summit in May 2026, which marked the first amendment to the ASEAN Charter.

On November 16, Trade and Industry Secretary Cristina Aldeguer-Roque announced that Indonesia, Malaysia, the Philippines, and Singapore had expressed support for a proposed regional oil stockpiling initiative, while the United Arab Emirates had expressed interest in participating. The initiative aims to improve access to petroleum reserves during supply disruptions and reduce transportation costs. Its implementation arrangements remained under development.

The 2026 Southeast Asian haze crisis was among the agenda for the summit, where Indonesian President Prabowo Subianto apologized to Singapore and Malaysia for the transboundary haze caused by wildfires in Indonesia. Prabowo outlined measures taken by his government to combat the fires, while Singaporean Prime Minister Lawrence Wong proposed expanding a bilateral Singapore–Indonesia task force into an ASEAN-wide platform for investigating companies linked to the fires.

Indian Prime Minister Narendra Modi in a group photograph along with ASEAN leaders at the 23rd ASEAN–India Summit in Pasay, November 17, 2026.

During the 29th ASEAN–Japan Summit on November 17, Japanese Prime Minister Sanae Takaichi proposed allowing ASEAN member states to use unused crude oil storage facilities in Japan under a regional oil stockpiling initiative. At the Asia Zero Emission Community leaders' meeting, held alongside the summit, Takaichi also proposed establishing an Asian oil security task force to coordinate petroleum reserves and emergency supply arrangements.

Protests against Pax Silica and Donald Trump in Manila, November 16, 2026.

Prior to U.S. President Donald Trump's arrival at the summit on November 17, protesters gathered across the Philippines for the Trump Out campaign to denounce a potential Pax Silica agreement. Human rights groups Karapatan and Amnesty International, International Association of Democratic Lawyers and other international groups, Philippine lawmakers, civil society organization, and church groups criticized the reported mass arrests and alleged police brutality during the protests. Political prisoners solidarity group KAPATID reported 857 arrests.

The summit concluded on November 17 with President Bongbong Marcos formally transferring the ASEAN chairmanship to Singaporean Prime Minister Lawrence Wong. Singapore is scheduled to assume the chairmanship on January 1, 2027.

**ASEAN members** Host state and leader are shown in bold text.
Member	Represented by	Title
Brunei	Hassanal Bolkiah	Sultan
Cambodia	Hangchuon Naron (Note: Deputy Prime Minister Hangchuon Naron represented Cambodia for the events held on November 15–16, including the opening ceremony, as Prime Minister Hun Manet hosted the 20th Organisation internationale de la Francophonie summit in Phnom Penh that time. Manet traveled to Manila on November 17 to represent Cambodia in the closing summits.)	Deputy Prime Minister and Minister of Education, Youth and Sport
Cambodia	Hun Manet	Prime Minister
Indonesia	Prabowo Subianto	President
Laos	Saleumxay Kommasith	Prime Minister
Malaysia	Anwar Ibrahim	Prime Minister
Myanmar	Han Win Aung	Director General of ASEAN Affairs Department, Ministry of Foreign Affairs
**Philippines**	**Bongbong Marcos**	**President**
Singapore	Lawrence Wong	Prime Minister
Thailand	Anutin Charnvirakul	Prime Minister
Timor-Leste	Xanana Gusmão	Prime Minister
Vietnam	Lê Minh Hưng	Prime Minister
**Guest invitees (countries)**
Member	Represented by	Title
Australia	Anthony Albanese	Prime Minister
Brazil	Luiz Inácio Lula da Silva	President
Canada	Mark Carney	Prime Minister
China	Li Qiang	Premier
India	Narendra Modi	Prime Minister
Japan	Sanae Takaichi	Prime Minister
New Zealand	Winston Peters	Minister of Foreign Affairs
Russia	Sergey Lavrov	Minister of Foreign Affairs
South Korea	Lee Jae Myung	President
United States	Donald Trump	President
**Guest invitees (international institutions)**
Member	Represented by	Title
FIFA	Gianni Infantino	President
IMF	Kristalina Georgieva	Managing Director
United Nations	António Guterres	Secretary-General

=== Sidelines ===
The Manila Dialogue on the South China Sea took place on November 15–17 at City of Dreams Manila, gathering maritime security practitioners, experts and officials to discuss the 2016 South China Sea Arbitration ruling, regional security cooperation, negotiations on a code of conduct, and measures to prevent maritime incidents and resolve disputes peacefully.

The 2026 ASEAN Inclusive Growth Summit hosted by Mastercard and the ASEAN Business Advisory Council Philippines was held on November 11 at Shangri-La at the Fort, Manila. Among the speakers were American and Cambodian actress and humanitarian Angelina Jolie and Filipino actress Lea Salonga.

An official state visit of Brazilian President Luiz Inácio Lula da Silva was scheduled in conjunction to his participation in the summit, arriving earlier on November 13. This was the first visit by a sitting Brazilian president to the Philippines.

The Philippines and Canada finalized a free trade agreement between the two countries in a bilateral meeting before the summit on November 14.

On November 15, the Philippines and Australia signed a defence cooperation agreement in Manila, simplifying procedures for joint military exercises and expanding maritime surveillance, information sharing, training, and disaster response.

The Quadrilateral Security Dialogue (Quad) held a leaders' meeting at Solaire Resort in Parañaque on November 17, its first since 2024. The Quad leaders announced the Indo-Pacific Maritime Surveillance Collaboration, including plans to conduct their first joint maritime patrol aircraft exercise in 2027. They also announced plans to hold their first business leaders' forum in early 2027 and expand cooperation on cybersecurity and regional connectivity. U.S. President Donald Trump said the four countries had reached agreements to diversify critical mineral supply chains.

Also on November 17, Trump and Thai Prime Minister Anutin Charnvirakul signed a joint statement at Solaire Resort confirming that negotiations on a bilateral reciprocal trade agreement had substantially concluded. Trump said the proposed agreement would eliminate Thai tariffs on U.S. exports and remove several non-tariff trade barriers. Both countries planned to finalize the agreement's text and complete their respective domestic procedures before signing it.

Following the summit, Trump paid a state visit to the Philippines on November 18. He was received by Philippine President Bongbong Marcos at Malacañang Palace, where the two leaders held bilateral talks on defense cooperation, trade, investment, and energy, including potential cooperation on civilian nuclear power. The visit also included a state luncheon hosted by Marcos.

== See also ==
- APEC China 2026 – several leaders who attended the 49th ASEAN Summit also attended APEC China 2026 in November 2026
