= Mactan Newtown =

The Mactan Newtown
- Central business district
- Country: Philippines
- Region: Central Visayas
- Province: Cebu
- City: Lapu-Lapu City

Area
  - Total: 0.3 km^{2} (0.12 sq mi)

The Mactan Newtown, is a 30-hectare (74-acre) mixed-use, master-planned central business district located in Lapu-Lapu City, Cebu, Philippines. It is the first integrated township development built by Megaworld Corporation outside of Metro Manila, and contains facilities and establishments such as condominiums, hotels, business process outsourcing office towers, a lifestyle mall, a school, a convention center, and a beachfront.

== History ==
Sometime in the 1990s, Megaworld Corporation under its subsidiary named Megaworld Properties and Holdings, Inc. purchased 16 hectares of property in Lapu-Lapu City located beside Shangri-La Mactan Resort Hotel & Spa. Due to the onset of the Asian Financial Crisis and litigation regarding the sale of a portion of the lot, plans for the property were postponed for its other existing developments in Metro Manila.

In 2007, Megaworld restarted the project by announcing ₱1.5 billion investment to develop the land, and hinted at plans of further property acquisition. Later in 2011, Megaworld announced further development of the property, with the first developments being a 5-story BPO office named One World Center and 8 Newtown Boulevard. Later on in 2012, it would officially unveil the Mactan Newtown name, aiming to replicate its live-work-play development of Eastwood City located in Quezon City.

In 2014, Megaworld increased its investment on the township development from ₱20 billion, to ₱30 billion after forming a joint venture (JV) with Landmark Inc. for the development of an 11.5-hectare beachfront property, which expanded the Mactan Newtown development from 16.8 hectares to 28.8 hectares. In 2026, Megaworld opened the Mactan Expo, a ₱1.5 billion standalone convention center.

== Commercial ==
=== Mactan Newtown Beach Walk ===
The Mactan Newtown will include commercial establishments, such as the Mactan Newtown Beach Walk. The two-level lifestyle mall will be situated on a beachside cliff and will highlight a 1.4-hectare man-made lagoon, a 3-story boutique hotel, garden chapel, beach walk, and rows of retail shops and restaurants including four cinemas. Megaworld was projected to spend ₱1.5 billion to construct the Mactan Newtown Beach Walk, which was expected to be completed by 2021.

== Residential ==
Mactan Newtown is home to multiple residential developments such as the 8 Newtown Boulevard, which includes four 18-story towers, One Pacific Residence, La Victoria Global Residences, a 20-story condominium building that will include 181 units, and The Pearl Global Residences, a 20-story condominium that will add 222 units from the Mactan Newtown's 1,836 existing residential units from its inventory.

== Facilities ==
The Newtown School of Excellence is located in the area which opened on June 2018. It is operated by Megaworld in partnership with Lasallian Schools Supervision Services Association Inc. (LASSSAI). It currently offers education from nursery level up to Grade 9.

The Mactan Newtown Transport Hub is also located in the area, which caters to jeepneys within Mactan and buses bound for IT Park in Cebu City and Danao.

The Mactan Expo is a two-story convention center located within the development with a capacity of 2,500 guests and attendees. It was completed in under 2 years on a budget of ₱1.5 billion, with a soft opening for the ASEAN Tourism Forum on January and its official opening and inauguration being on March 16, 2026.
