= 2025 ASEAN Summits =

ASEAN diplomatic conference in Malaysia

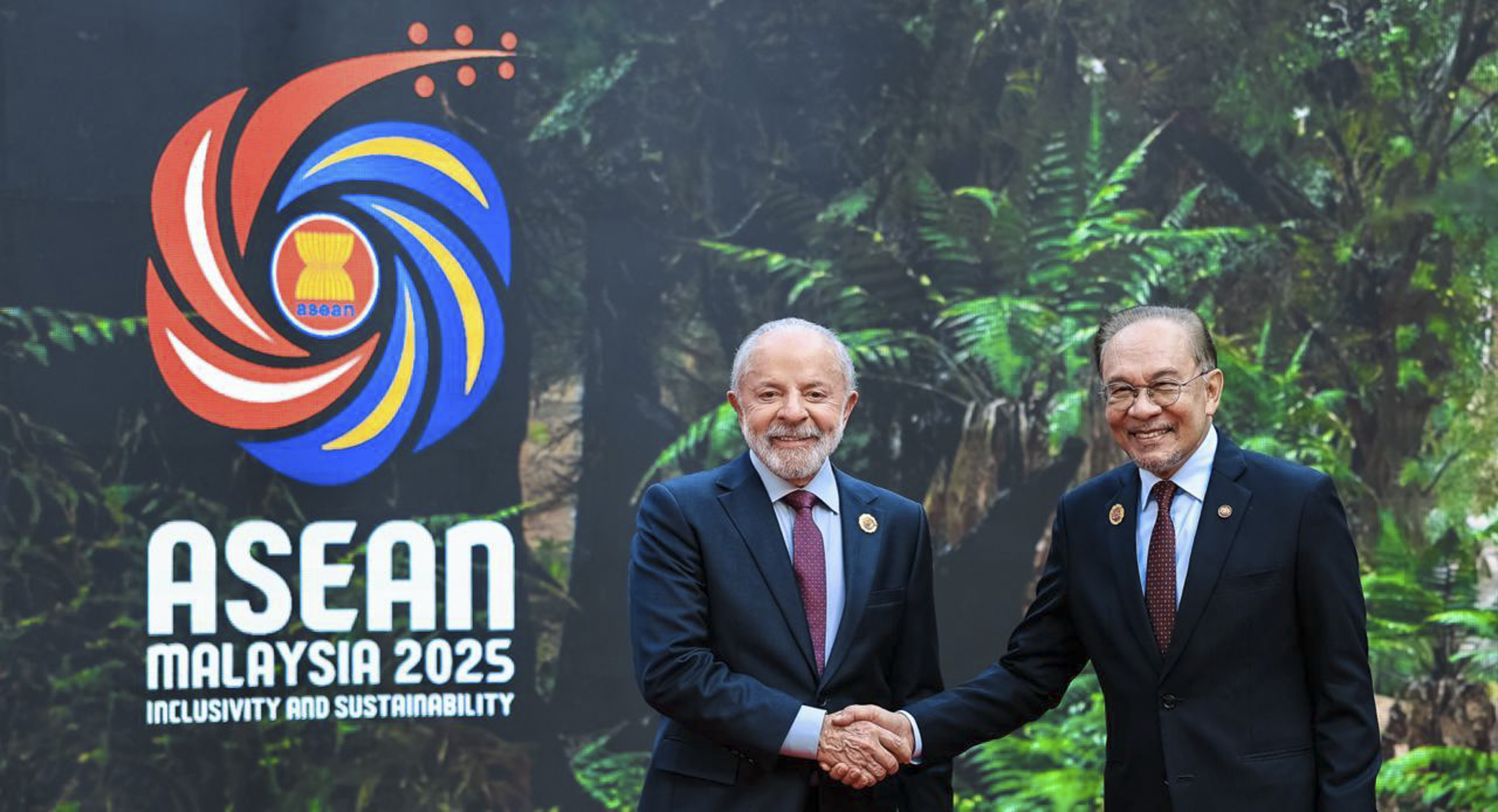
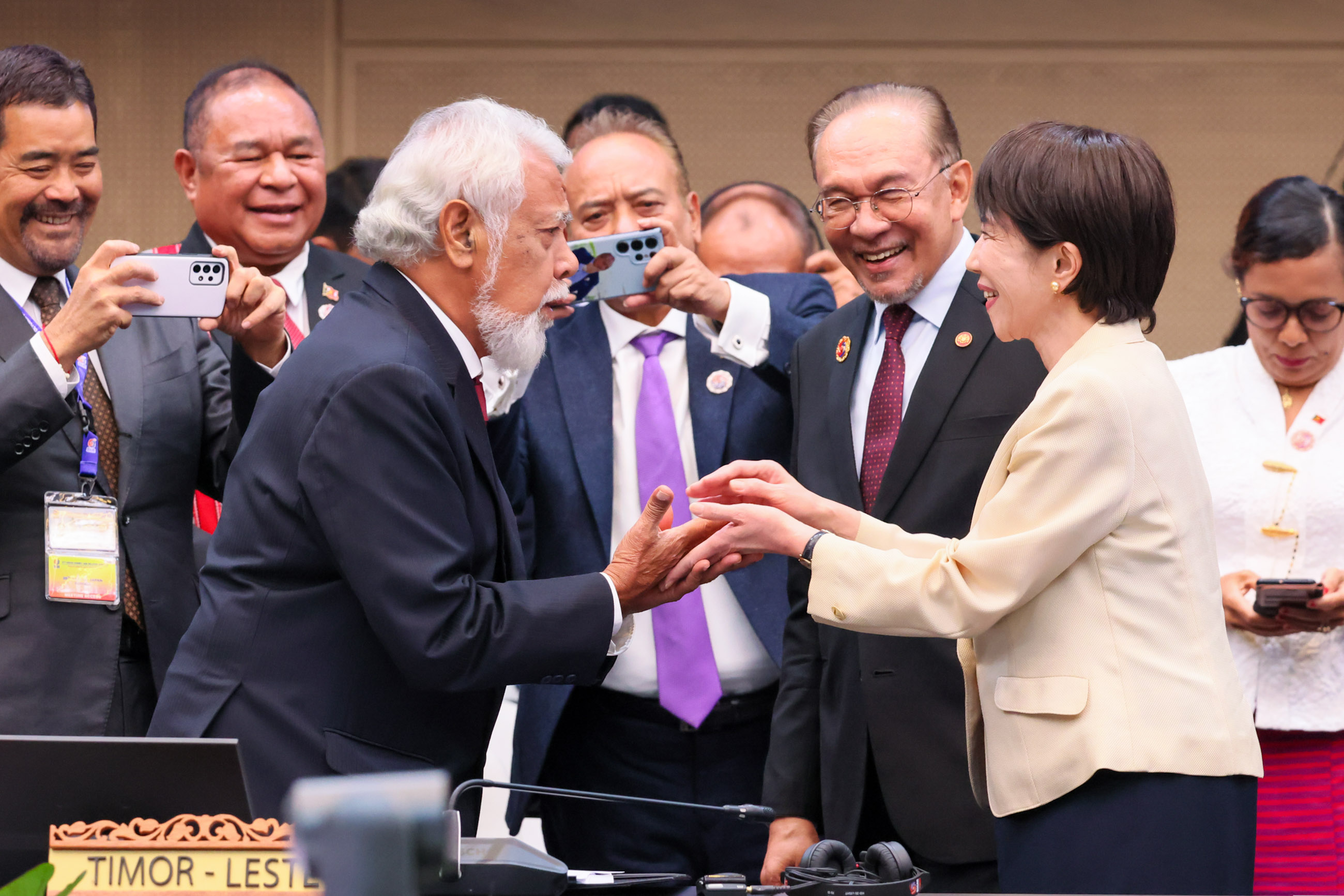
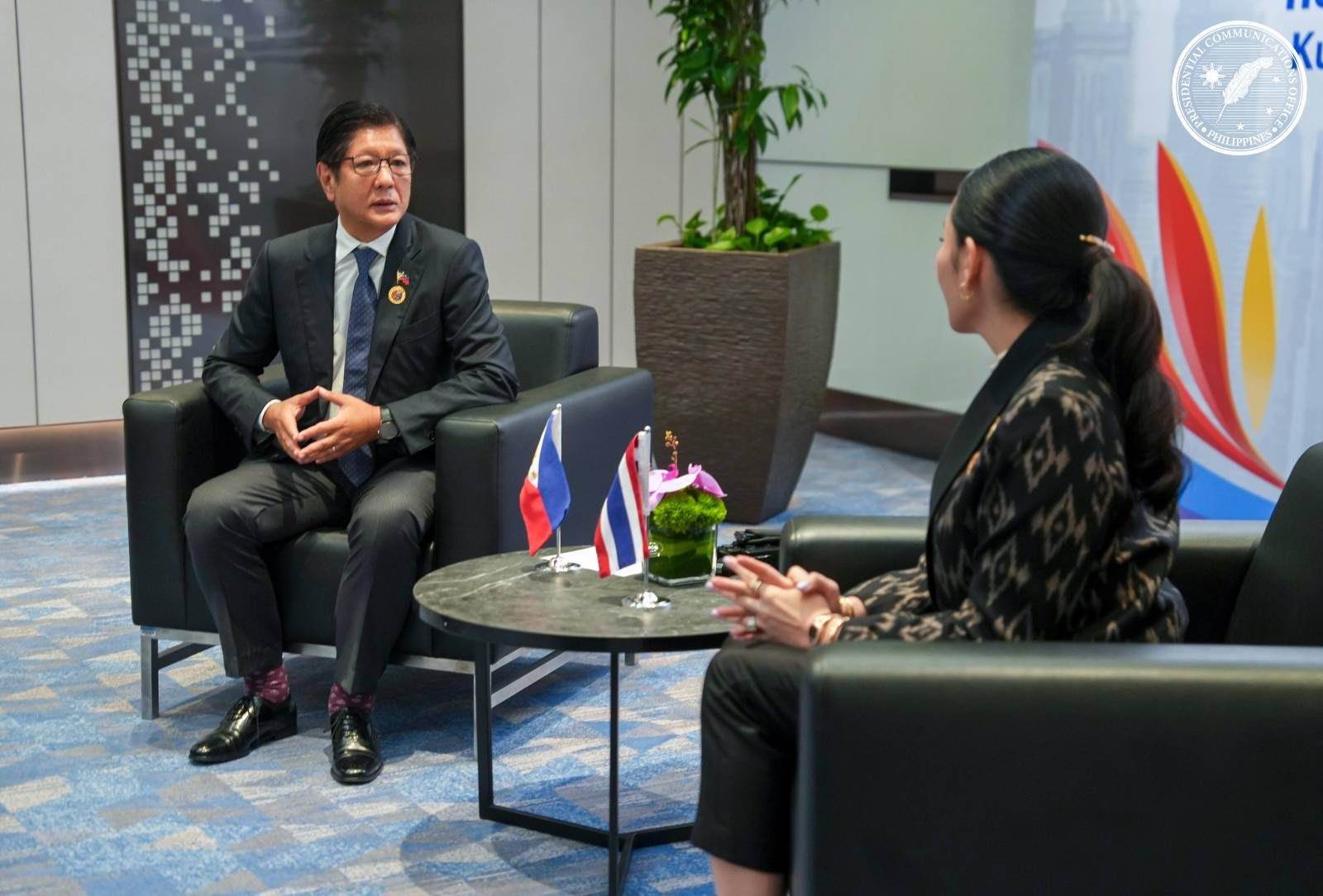
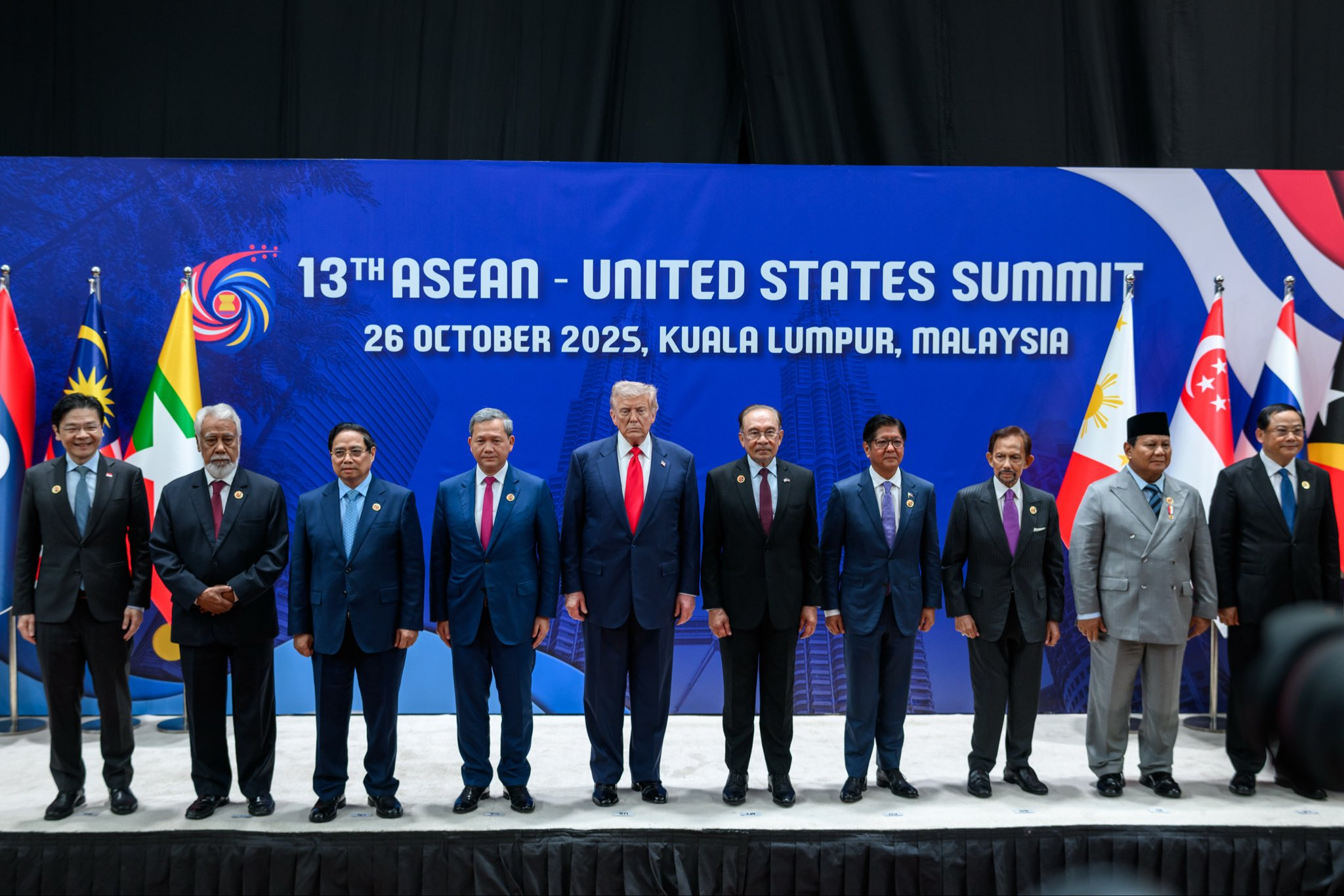
Highlights of the 2025 ASEAN Summits (clockwise from top right): The Prime Minister of Timor-Leste, Xanana Gusmão, shaking hands with the Prime Minister of Japan, Sanae Takaichi, while being watched by the current chairman of ASEAN, Anwar Ibrahim; ASEAN leaders having their photograph taken with the President of the United States, Donald Trump, in the 13th ASEAN–United States Summit; the President of the Philippines, Bongbong Marcos, and the Prime Minister of Thailand, Paetongtarn Shinawatra, meet on the sidelines of the 46th ASEAN Summit in Kuala Lumpur, Malaysia on 26 May 2025; the President of Brazil, Luiz Inácio Lula da Silva, being welcomed by the Prime Minister of Malaysia, Anwar Ibrahim, in the 47th ASEAN summit.

The 2025 ASEAN Summits, also known as the 46th and 47th ASEAN Summits, were diplomatic conferences centering on the Association of Southeast Asian Nations (ASEAN) which were held in Malaysia from 26 to 27 May 2025 and 26 to 28 October 2025. This marks the fifth and sixth time the ASEAN Summit was held in Malaysia.

== 46th ASEAN Summit ==
1st 2025 ASEAN Summit 46th ASEAN Summit
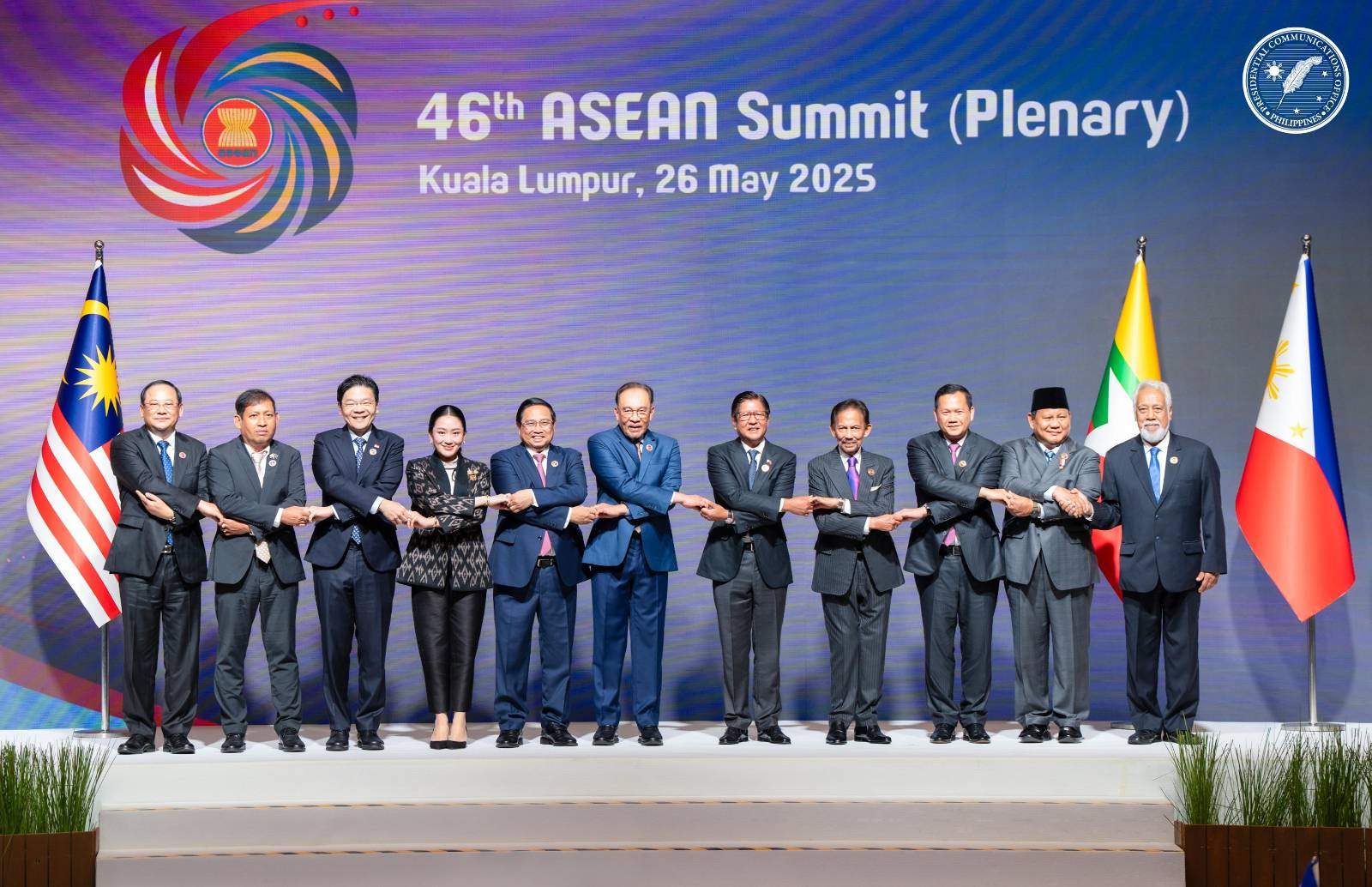
- Delegates of the 46th ASEAN Summit which includes leaders from outside ASEAN
- Host country: Malaysia
- Date: 26–27 May 2025
- Cities: Kuala Lumpur
- Venues: Kuala Lumpur Convention Centre
- Participants: ASEAN members Guest invitees (see below)
- Chair: Prime Minister Anwar Ibrahim
- Follows: 2024 ASEAN Summit
- Precedes: 2025 ASEAN Summit (in October)

Under Malaysia's chairmanship in 2025, Malaysia was the host for the ASEAN Summits.

=== Preparations ===
With talks on the South China Sea, the Regional Comprehensive Economic Partnership (RCEP), and the development of the ASEAN Economic Community (AEC), Malaysia sought to make sure that the summit's agenda represented the various needs and goals of ASEAN member nations. By consulting with ASEAN leaders, Malaysian officials – including Prime Minister Anwar Ibrahim — played a crucial part in the summit's preparations and made sure that Malaysia's interests were taken into account within the larger regional framework.

=== Attendees ===
**ASEAN members** Host state and leader are shown in bold text.
Member	Represented by	Title
Brunei	Hassanal Bolkiah	Sultan
Cambodia	Hun Manet	Prime Minister
Indonesia	Prabowo Subianto	President
Laos	Sonexay Siphandone	Prime Minister
**Malaysia**	**Anwar Ibrahim**	**Prime Minister**
Philippines	Bongbong Marcos	President
Singapore	Lawrence Wong	Prime Minister
Thailand	Paetongtarn Shinawatra	Prime Minister
Vietnam	Phạm Minh Chính	Prime Minister
**Guest Invitees (countries)**
Member	Represented by	Title
China	Li Qiang	Premier
Timor-Leste	Xanana Gusmão	Prime Minister
**Guest Invitees (international institutions)**
Member	Represented by	Title
Gulf Cooperation Council	Jasem Mohamed Al-Budaiwi	Secretary-General

=== Events ===
26 May 2025

- During the ASEAN Summit on 26 May, Malaysian Prime Minister Anwar Ibrahim suggested that Timor-Leste could officially join ASEAN during the following summit scheduled in October 2025. He would later confirm that Timor-Leste would join ASEAN on 26 October 2025.

10 July 2025

- During the ASEAN Foreign Minister's summit in 10 July, Secretary of State Marco Rubio of the United States met with his counterpart, Minister of Foreign Affairs Sergey Lavrov of Russia. Rubio said he conveyed the United States' frustration that further progress has not been made on resolving the war in Ukraine. During his 50-minute conversation with Lavrov, he declared, "It was a frank conversation. It was a significant one."

== 47th ASEAN Summit ==
2nd 2025 ASEAN Summit 47th ASEAN Summit
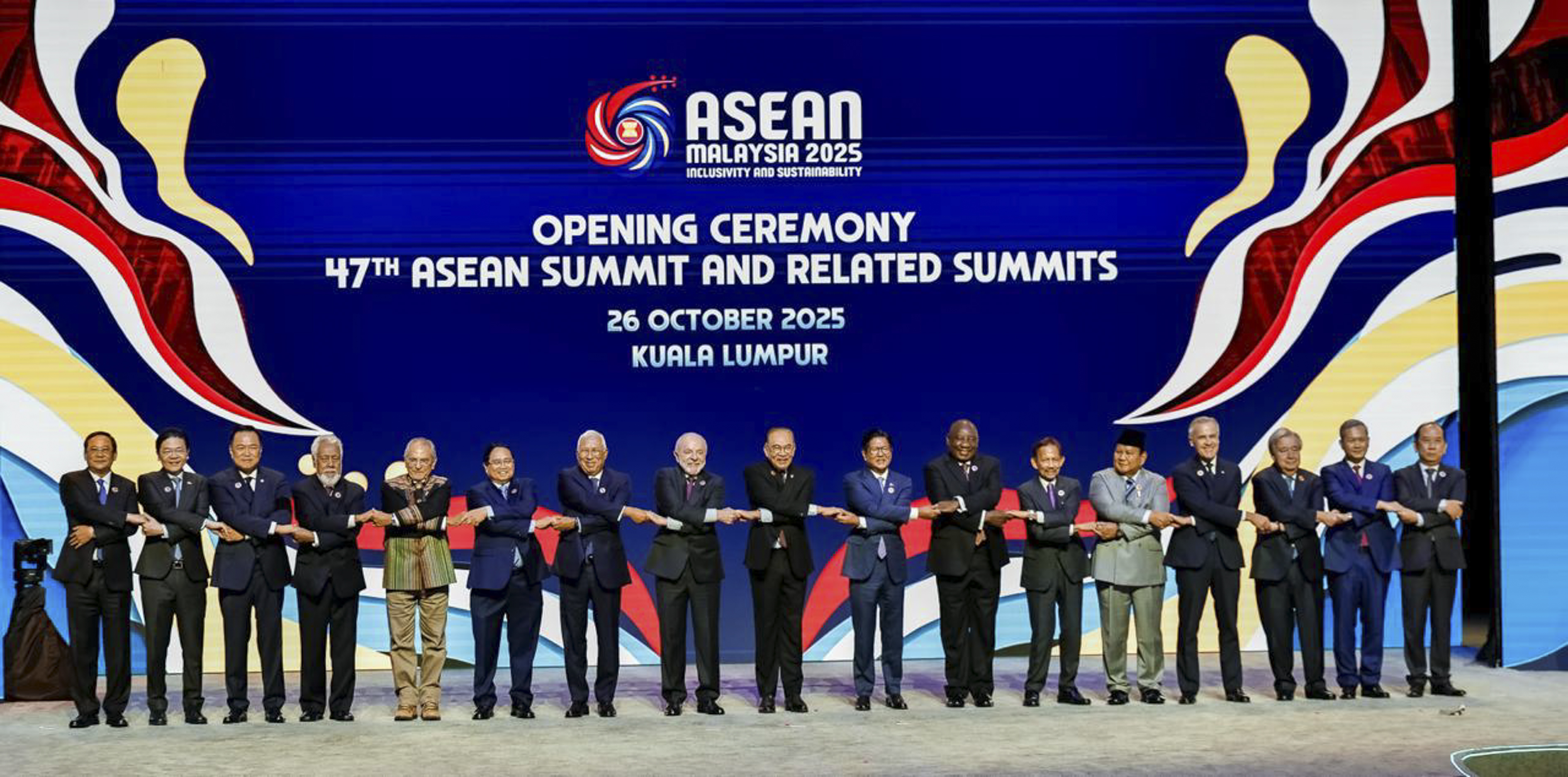
- Delegates of the 47th ASEAN Summit which includes leaders from outside ASEAN
- Host country: Malaysia
- Date: 26–28 October 2025
- Cities: Kuala Lumpur
- Venues: Kuala Lumpur Convention Centre
- Participants: ASEAN members Guest invitees (see below)
- Chair: Prime Minister Anwar Ibrahim
- Follows: 2025 ASEAN Summit (in May)
- Precedes: 2026 ASEAN Summits

The culminating event was held in Malaysia on 26–28 October 2025 (47th summit). The regional gathering's topic this year was "Inclusivity and Sustainability". It was anticipated to be the largest ASEAN Summit since its founding in 1976.

The signing ceremony of the Declaration on the Admission of Timor-Leste to ASEAN.

=== Preparations ===
One week before the summit, police officers were positioned along all main roads leading to the convention center as part of the increased security measures. To guarantee efficient automobile and delegation circulation, traffic police ran control simulations. Major roads were closed intermittently before and during the Summit.

=== Attendees ===
**ASEAN members** Host state and leader are shown in bold text.
Member	Represented by	Title
Brunei	Hassanal Bolkiah	Sultan
Cambodia	Hun Manet	Prime Minister
Indonesia	Prabowo Subianto	President
Laos	Sonexay Siphandone	Prime Minister
**Malaysia**	**Anwar Ibrahim**	**Prime Minister**
Myanmar	U Hau Khan Sum	Permanent Secretary of the Ministry of Foreign Affairs
Philippines	Bongbong Marcos	President
Singapore	Lawrence Wong	Prime Minister
Thailand	Anutin Charnvirakul	Prime Minister
Timor-Leste	Xanana Gusmão	Prime Minister
Vietnam	Phạm Minh Chính	Prime Minister
**Guest Invitees (countries)**
Member	Represented by	Title
Australia	Anthony Albanese	Prime Minister
Brazil	Luiz Inácio Lula da Silva	President
Canada	Mark Carney	Prime Minister
China	Li Qiang	Premier
Finland	Elina Valtonen	Minister for Foreign Affairs
India	S. Jaishankar	Minister of External Affairs
Japan	Sanae Takaichi	Prime Minister
New Zealand	Christopher Luxon	Prime Minister
Russia	Alexey Overchuk	Deputy Prime Minister
South Africa	Cyril Ramaphosa	President
South Korea	Lee Jae Myung	President
United States	Donald Trump	President
**Guest Invitees (international institutions)**
Member	Represented by	Title
BRICS	Luiz Inácio Lula da Silva	Chairman
European Union	António Costa	President
FIFA	Gianni Infantino	President
IMF	Kristalina Georgieva	managing director
G20	Cyril Ramaphosa	Chairman
United Nations	António Guterres	Secretary-General
World Bank	Carlos Felipe Jaramillo	Vice President

=== Events ===
25 October 2025

- Prior to the actual summit, the Instrument of Accession to the Treaty of Amity and Cooperation in Southeast Asia (TAC) was signed by Finnish Minister of Foreign Affairs Elina Valtonen. The accession of Finland brings the number of High Contracting Parties to the TAC to 58.

26 October 2025

- At the opening ceremony, ASEAN awarded the ASEAN Prize 2025 to the Union Youth Federations of Cambodia (UYFC), a broad-based youth organisation based in Phnom Penh.
- ASEAN leaders formally signed the accession of Timor-Leste into the regional bloc as its 11th member.
- A peace-deal between Cambodia and Thailand (the "Kuala Lumpur Peace Accord") was signed by Thai Prime Minister Anutin Charnvirakul and Cambodian Prime Minister Hun Manet, which aims to resolve the longstanding border conflict between the two nations. The signing was attended by U.S. President Donald Trump and Malaysian Prime Minister Anwar Ibrahim.
- During the ASEAN leaders retreat session, ASEAN leaders reviewed the implementation of the Five-Point Consensus (5PC) on the Myanmar issue and the way forward in addressing the political and humanitarian crisis in the country, based on recommendations from the 37th ASEAN Coordinating Council (ACC) Meeting and the ASEAN Foreign Ministers’ Meetings on 9 July and 25 October 2025.
- ASEAN Secretary-General Dr. Kao Kim Hourn attended the handover ceremony of the Second Protocol to Amend the ASEAN Trade in Goods Agreement (ATIGA) by the ASEAN Economic Ministers. The upgraded ATIGA is designed to be more responsive to both regional and global economic shifts, especially the growth and development of supply chains.
- European Council President António Costa announced the intention for EU-ASEAN ties to be elevated to a Comprehensive Strategic Partnership by 2027, after concluding a Free Trade Agreement with Indonesia, as well as sharing the progress of similar FTAs with Malaysia, the Philippines and Thailand.
- FIFA President Gianni Infantino announced the launch of the new FIFA ASEAN cup in a Memorandum of Understanding with Dr. Kao. The new event will complement the biennial ASEAN Championship (formerly the AFF Cup) and aims to strengthen regional football competitiveness, and will be held during the official FIFA international match windows. This shift obliges clubs worldwide to release players for national duty, and ensures ASEAN teams can call up their best talents playing in foreign leagues, significantly boosting the standard of regional competition.
- President Trump attended the 13th ASEAN-United States Summit to review the ASEAN-U.S. Comprehensive Strategic Partnership. On the sideline, U.S. Treasury Secretary Scott Bessent and Chinese Vice Premier He Lifeng reached a "framework deal" on TikTok's operations in the U.S., rare earths and reciprocal tariffs.
- The 28th ASEAN–Japan Summit was held to review future directions of cooperation, especially on digital technology, clean energy, maritime security, and the ASEAN Outlook on the Indo‑Pacific (AOIP). The summit was attended by Japan's newly-elected Prime Minister Sanae Takaichi for her first international visit since taking office, signaling Japan's continued support for ASEAN centrality and Malaysia's chairmanship.

27 October 2025

- Dr. Kao attended the 5th Regional Comprehensive Economic Partnership (RCEP) Summit together with Leaders of the RCEP Participating Countries (ASEAN Member States, Australia, China, Japan, New Zealand, and the Republic of Korea). This was the first Leaders’ meeting since the RCEP Agreement entered into force in 2022.
- UN Secretary-General António Guterres attended the 15th ASEAN-UN Summit to discuss on the recent adoption of the ASEAN-UN Plan of Action (2026–2030), including the possible development of frameworks and work plans as initiated by the respective ASEAN sectoral bodies and their UN counterparts. The Plan of Action will also contribute to the promotion of the ASEAN Community-building and integration as well as ASEAN's efforts in realising the ASEAN 2045: Our Shared Future, the UN 2030 Agenda for Sustainable Development, International Conference on Population and Development Programme of Action as well as the Pact for the Future, which includes a Global Digital Compact and a Declaration on Future Generations.
- The 20th East Asia Summit was attended by Heads of State/Government and High Representatives of the EAS participating countries. BRICS Chair Luiz Inácio Lula da Silva and the G20 President Cyril Ramaphosa also attended the Open Session, as guests of the Chair, and briefed the Meeting on their respective cooperation with the EAS to advance economic resilience and boost sustainable growth. The Leaders adopted the Kuala Lumpur Declaration on the Twentieth Anniversary of the EAS and thematic statements on relevant issues. On the sideline of the event, Assistant Secretary of State for East Asian and Pacific Affairs of the United States, Michael G. DeSombre also discussed the implementation of the ASEAN-United States Leaders’ Joint Vision Statement to Promote Safer, Stronger, and More Prosperous ASEAN and the United States.
- The ASEAN Plus Three Summit was attended by representatives from ASEAN member countries, China, South Korea and Japan, where issues such as geo-economic challenges, emergency medical supplies and security were discussed.
- Canadian Prime Minister Mark Carney declared Canada's intention to conclude negotiations on the Canada-ASEAN Free Trade Agreement by 2025 and announce by 2026, with particular focus in energy, nuclear modular reactors, defense and investments.
- Russian Deputy Prime Minister Alexey Overchuk announced their intention of investing in enhancing its connectivity with ASEAN, with further discussions on nuclear energy and small modular reactor (SMR) technology.
- President Lee Jae Myung of South Korea attended the 26th ASEAN-Republic of Korea (ROK) Summit, and reaffirmed both sides’ commitment to further advancing the ASEAN-ROK Comprehensive Strategic Partnership established last year, and discussed the future direction of cooperation. Negotiations for the Malaysia-Republic of Korea Free Trade Agreement (MKFTA) was concluded in the Summit. The MKFTA covers goods, services, investments, customs facilitation, sanitary and phytosanitary, digital trade, green economy, bioeconomy and economic cooperation, with the Chapter on Economic Cooperation and Capacity Building being the key focus. The MKFTA is set to be Malaysia's 19th free trade agreement to date as the country moves to diversify its export markets amid global economic uncertainties.
- India's External Affairs Minister S. Jaishankar attended the 22nd ASEAN-India Summit to discuss on further advancing an ASEAN-India CSP, with a focus on sustainable tourism. He also met with counterparts from Japan, the United States, Australia, New Zealand and others on the sidelines of the summit. Indian Prime Minister Narendra Modi addressed the Summit virtually.

28 October 2025

- The ASEAN-China Free Trade Area (ACFTA) 3.0 Upgrade Protocol was signed by China's Minister of Commerce Wang Wentao and Malaysia's Investment, Trade and Industry Minister Tengku Zafrul Abdul Aziz, covering digital, green economies and supply chain connectivity. The signing was witnessed by Chinese Premier Li Qiang and Malaysian Prime Minister Anwar Ibrahim during the 28th ASEAN-China Summit.
- At the ASEAN-Indo-Pacific Forum, Australian Prime Minister Anthony Albanese announced an AUD 20 billion investment pipeline across Southeast Asia to strengthen regional partnership and ASEAN integration.
- New Zealand Prime Minister Christopher Luxon attended the ASEAN-New Zealand Commemorative Summit to mark 50 years of dialogue relations between the two regions. Luxon aimed to discuss on a new regional air services agreement, as well as to conclude the review of the Malaysia-New Zealand Free Trade Agreement (MNZFTA) by the end of 2025. At the Halal Diplomacy Event, Luxon announced the intention to enhance the export of safe and reliable halal meat products to Malaysia following the exchange of the upgraded Halal Implementing Arrangement (HIA) with Malaysia today. New Zealand has also expressed interest in joining the ASEAN Halal Council.
- The 5th ASEAN-Australia Summit will convene at 2.30 pm, providing a platform for ASEAN leaders and their Australian counterparts to explore new avenues for cooperation, and further strengthen economic and strategic ties.

Malaysia handed the ASEAN chairmanship to the Philippines for 2026.

== See also ==
- Accession of Timor-Leste to ASEAN
- 2017 ASEAN Summits
- APEC South Korea 2025 – several leaders attending the 47th ASEAN Summit are also expected to attend APEC South Korea 2025
