= ASEAN Tourism Forum 2026 =

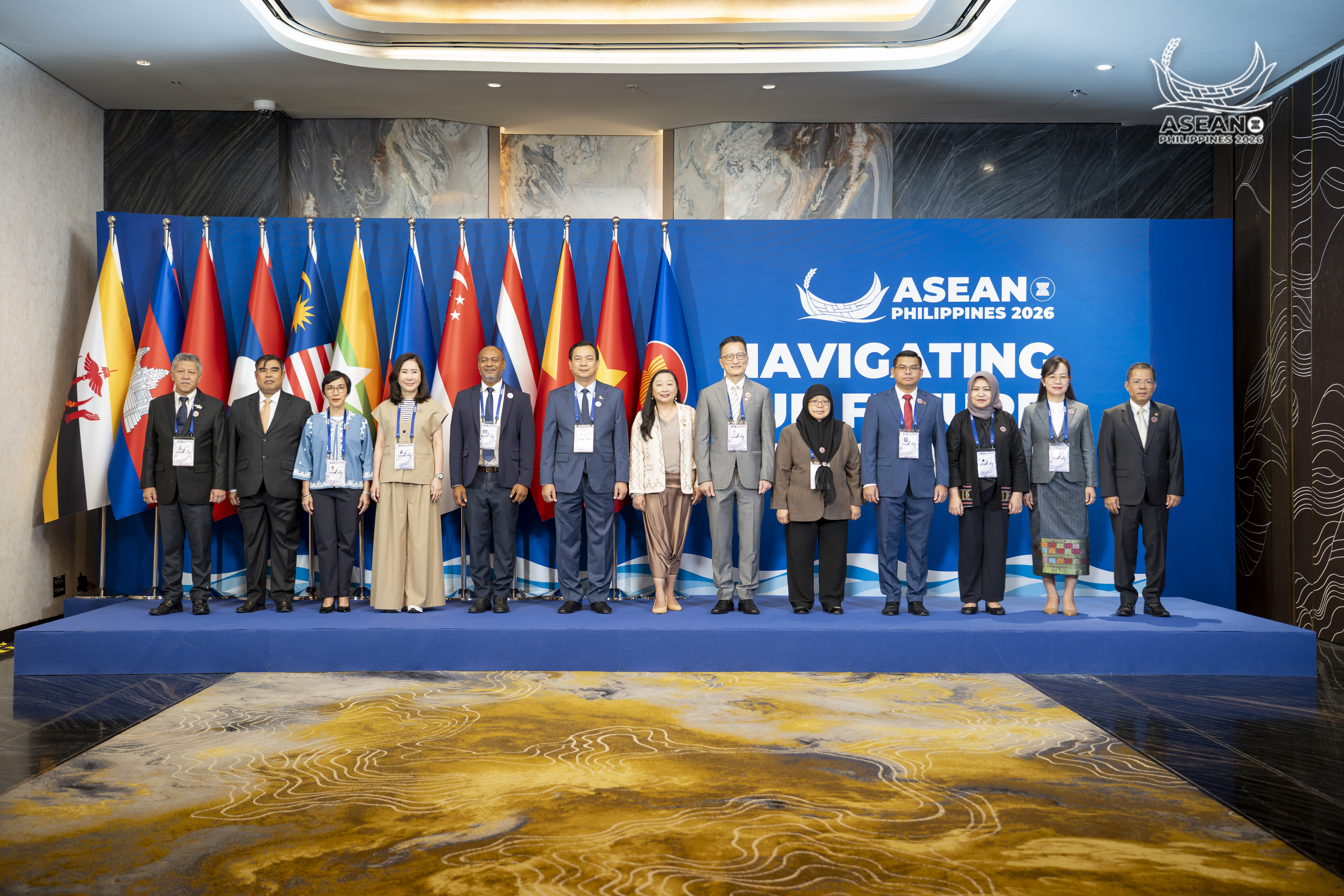
Representatives of ASEAN states pose during the Opening Ceremony.

The ASEAN Tourism Forum 2026, were conferences centering on the tourism industry in the Association of Southeast Asian Nations (ASEAN) which were held in Cebu from 26 to 28 January 2026. It also coincided with the ASEAN Foreign Ministers Retreat (AMM) that was also held on Cebu.

The Philippines assumed the ASEAN chairship in 2026 at a defining moment for the region. With almost 700 million people and the world's 5th largest economy, ASEAN stands at the crossroads of unprecedented opportunity and evolving global challenges. By 2030, ASEAN is poised to become the 4th largest economy in the world—a powerful testament to the strength of its cooperation, diversity and shared aspirations.

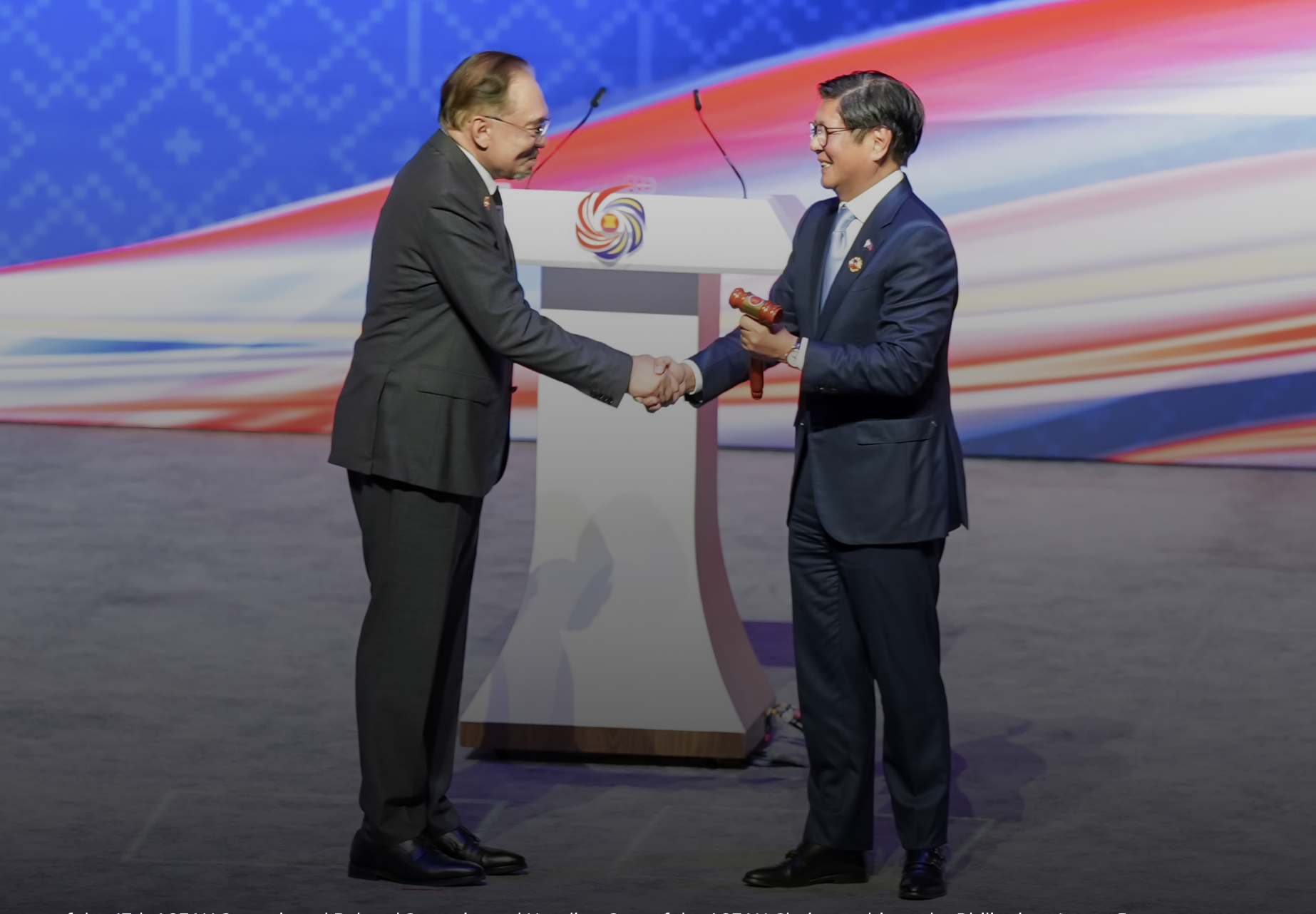
Malaysia handed over of ASEAN Chairship to the Philippines in November 2025.

As chair, the Philippines embraces this responsibility with resolve and vision. Guided by the theme Navigating Our Future, Together, the 2026 chairship reflects the Philippines’ commitment to leading ASEAN with unity, clarity, and purpose. It is a call to steer our region toward greater resilience, deeper connection, and meaningful change that places our people at the center of progress.

This chairship coincides with the 50th anniversary of the Treaty of Amity and Cooperation in Southeast Asia (TAC), a timely opportunity to reaffirm ASEAN's founding principles and collective vision.

== Three strategic priorities ==
Rooted in ASEAN's founding values of peace, stability, and inclusive growth, the Philippines' Chairship is shaped by three strategic priorities:

1. Peace and Security Anchors: Championing peace and regional stability through dialogue, adherence to international law, and strengthened cooperation on emerging and non-traditional security threats.
2. Prosperity Corridors: establishing string connections for collective progress through economic linkages, digital transformation, inclusivity for ASEAN citizens
3. People Empowerment: Empowering ASEAN's citizens by embracing and prioritizing social inclusion, shared identity and ASEAN community

people by fostering social inclusion, protecting vulnerable groups, and promoting a sense of shared identity and community.

These priorities are expected to be the compass, where decisions are anchored, in shaping an ASEAN future where peace, prosperity and people do not only become aspirations but as enduring foundations of the entire ASEAN community

== A platform for cooperation, shared growth ==
The Philippines pushed for deeper regional collaboration in tourism during the 63rd ASEAN National Tourism Organizations (NTOs) Meeting in Cebu City during the Forum's opeming, as discussions emphasized the need for ASEAN Member States to move forward not as competing destinations but as a unified region ahead of the 2026.

Speaking before heads of national tourism organizations, Department of Tourism (DOT) emphasized that the regional meetings over the week must deliver tangible policies and benefits for tourism stakeholders.

Outcomes that support sustainability without sacrificing growth, that accelerate digital transformation while protecting trust and safety, and that keep communities at the heart of the tourism economy so that the benefits of travel are felt not only in arrivals but in myriad opportunities.

The ASEAN forum discussion would decide how meetings like this translates into the visitor journey, the competitiveness of our destinations, the resilience of our enterprises, and the livelihoods of our communities.

== Cebu takes center stage ==
The last time the Philippines hosted ATF was in 2016 in Manila. In 2026, ATF and the AMM came back to Cebu in time where its economy need a push.

Since Cebu is being positioned as a hub for regional tourism cooperation and economic recovery, hosting the ATF highlights the country's capacity to welcome thousands of international delegates and Cebu's readiness to stage world-class events.

A series of meetings started officially on Monday, January 26, 2026, in a hotel in Cebu City.

Local organizers said infrastructure, health, emergency, and engineering support systems are in place, with the provincial government committing additional manpower to ensure a smooth and safe hosting.

In a press conference, lead agency DOT said site enhancements, including welcome arches, banners, and airport and hotel branding, will be installed ahead of the event to reinforce Cebu's readiness to host the region and the world.

=== Peace and order ===
With over 5,000 delegates, excluding their families and other visitors for the ATF, the Philippine National Police Police Regional 7 has deployed 9,000 police officers and the active involvement of all security agencies.

ASEAN Lane

ASEAN delegates were allotted courtesy lanes in the South Road Properties (SRP), where most of the meetings will be held. The city will provide continuous monitoring and police officers will be on standby for assistance. Authorities reminded motorists to be extra cautious, drive slow and observe the courtesy extended to ASEAN Tourism Forum attendees.

=== Medical assistance ===
With a large number of visitors trooping to Cebu for the ATF, the provincial government leaders of the tri-cities Cebu City, Mandaue and Lapu-Lapu City have formed medical teams providing on-call medical assistance.

== Impact on Cebu tourism and economy ==
With the influx of visitors coming over to this January, for Sinulog and now for the ASEAN Tourism Forum, Cebu's economy is poised to significantly benefit from the spike in tourism arrivals, tourism spending, upgrades of tourism infrastructure and better global positioning.

Aside from the official meetings, delegates will be offered curated tours showcasing Cebu and nearby destinations, including a heritage tour of Cebu City, island hopping in Lapu-Lapu City, leisure and golf activities in northern Cebu, heritage sites in southern Cebu, the Bojo River experience in Aloguinsan, the sardine run in Moalboal, Kawasan Falls in Badian, and a culinary and leisure tour in Bohol.

The Department of Tourism has prepared thematic tours for delegates and these areas:

- Paglantaw, a heritage tour of Old Cebu
- Paglayag, an island hopping experience
- Bagani, a cultural tour of Lapu-lapu City
- Mugna, a creative journey through Cebu
- Lingaw, a leisure golf tour north of the province

Multiple industrial sectors are interested in joining and contributing to the region's economic agenda - it is a focused and inclusive opportunity that comes after 11 years now that Timor-Leste has been added as a new member.

The ASEAN Business and Investment Summit will gather thousands of global leaders, CEOs and top executives in discussions that will help shape the region's economic future.

== Side events ==
- 6th ASEAN Digital Ministers Meeting
  - Dates: January 12–16, 2026
  - Location: Hanoi, Vietnam
- Special Senior Officials Meeting on Energy (SOME)
  - Dates: January 20–22, 2026
  - Location: Bohol, Philippines
- 48th Meeting of the ASEAN +NTOs
  - Dates: January 27, 2026
  - Location: Cebu City, Philippines
- 34th Meeting of the ASEAN Trade Facilitation Joint Consultative Committee (ATF-JCC)
  - Dates: January 26–28, 2026
  - Location: Bohol, Philippines
- 17th ASEAN-Russia Tourism Ministers
  - Dates: January 27, 2026
  - Location: Cebu City, Philippines
- 26th Meeting of the ASEAN Ministers
  - Date: January 27, 2026
  - Location: Cebu City, Philippines
- Travel Exchange/ TRAVEX
  - Dates: January 28–30, 2026
  - Location: Mactan, Cebu
  - Business Scale:
    - More than 1,000 delegates are projected to attend TRAVEX.
    - Over 100 ASEAN exhibitors will participate. More than 300 international buyers have already signified interest in conducting business-to-business meetings.
- Meeting of the ASEAN +3 Tourism Miniters
  - Date: January 29, 2026
  - Location" Cebu City, Philippines
- ASEAN Foreign Ministers (AMM) Retreat
  - Date: January 29, 2026
  - Location; Cebu City, Philippines
- 13th Meeting of the ASEAN-India Tourism Ministers
  - Date: January 29, 2026
  - Location; Cebu City, Philippines
- 5th Meeting of the ASEAN Russia-Federation Tourism Ministers
  - Date: January 30, 2026
  - Location; Cebu City, Philippines
- ASEAN Business Advisory Council (ASEAN-BAC) Members Meeting
  - Date: January 30, 2026
  - Location; Cebu City, Philippines
