= ASEAN Charter =

Charter of the Association of Southeast Asian Nations

The ASEAN Charter
- Member states shown in green
- Signed: 20 November 2007
- Location: Singapore
- Effective: December 2008
- Condition: Ratification by all states
- Signatories: 11
- Parties: 11 (Brunei, Cambodia, Indonesia, Laos, Malaysia, Myanmar, Philippines, Singapore, Thailand, Timor-Leste and Vietnam)
- Depositary: Secretary-General of ASEAN
- Language: English

The ASEAN Charter is a constituent instrument of the Association of Southeast Asian Nations (ASEAN). It was adopted at the 13th ASEAN Summit in November 2007.

The intention to draft the Charter had been formally proposed at the 11th ASEAN Summit held in December 2005 in Kuala Lumpur, Malaysia. Ten ASEAN leaders, one from each member state, called the ASEAN Eminent Persons Group (EPG) were assigned to produce recommendations for the drafting of the charter.

At the 12th ASEAN Summit held in January 2007 in Cebu, the Philippines, several basic proposals were made public. ASEAN leaders agreed during the summit to set up a "high level task force on the drafting of the ASEAN Charter" composed of ten high level government officials from the ten member countries. The task force then held 13 meetings during 2007.

== The Charter ==
Principles set out in the charter include:

- Emphasis on the centrality of ASEAN in regional co-operation.
- Respect for the principles of territorial integrity, sovereignty, non-interference and national identities of ASEAN members.
- Promoting regional peace and identity, peaceful settlements of disputes through dialogue and consultation, and the renunciation of aggression.
- Upholding international law with respect to human rights, social justice and multilateral trade.
- Encouraging regional integration of trade.
- Appointment of a secretary-general and permanent representatives of ASEAN.
- Establish a human rights body and an unresolved dispute mechanism, to be formalised at ASEAN Summits.
- Development of friendly external relations and a position with the UN (like the EU)
- Increasing the number of ASEAN summits to twice a year and the ability to convene for emergencies.
- Reiterating the ASEAN flag's use, anthem, emblem, and national ASEAN day on 8 August.

Member State	Government Ratification	Deposit of Instrument of Ratification	Signed by
Singapore	18 Dec 2007	7 Jan 2008	Prime Minister
Brunei Darussalam	31 Jan 2008	15 Feb 2008	Sultan
Lao People's Democratic Republic	14 Feb 2008	20 Feb 2008	President
Malaysia	14 Feb 2008	20 Feb 2008	Foreign Minister
Vietnam	14 Mar 2008	19 Mar 2008	Minister of Foreign Affairs
Cambodia	25 Feb 2008	18 Apr 2008	National Assembly
Myanmar	21 Jul 2008	21 Jul 2008	Foreign Minister
Philippines	7 Oct 2008	12 Nov 2008	Senate
Indonesia	21 Oct 2008	13 Nov 2008	President and the People's Representative Council of the Republic of Indonesia
Thailand	16 Sep 2008	14 Nov 2008	Parliament
Timor-Leste		25 Oct 2025	

== Enactment ==
The charter came into force in December 2008, thirty days after Thailand's delivery of the final instrument of ratification. Thailand's permanent representative to the United Nations, Ambassador Don Pramudwinai deposited the document with ASEAN Secretary-General, Surin Pitsuwan, at the Thai mission in New York on 14 November. He issued a statement saying, "This is certainly an occasion to celebrate for the 570 million people of ASEAN. This means that when the ASEAN leaders gather at their annual summit in mid December, the ASEAN Charter will have come into force." He referred to the charter coming into force after the 14th Summit in Chiang Mai, Thailand, from 13–18 December. In doing so he added that celebrations would follow not only for the full ratification of the charter but also the entering into force of the new basic law of ASEAN, "It will be a rules-based and people-oriented organisation with its own legal personality".

== Launch ==
On 15 December 2008, the members of ASEAN met in the Indonesian capital of Jakarta to launch the charter, signed in November 2007, with the aim of moving closer to "an EU-style community". The charter turned ASEAN into a legal entity and aimed to create a single free-trade area for the region encompassing 600 million people. Indonesian President Susilo Bambang Yudhoyono stated: "This is a momentous development...ASEAN is...transforming itself into a community. It is achieved while ASEAN seeks a more vigorous role in Asian and global affairs at a time when the international system is experiencing a seismic shift", he added, referring to climate change and economic upheaval. Southeast Asia is no longer the bitterly divided, war-torn region it was in the 1960s and 1970s".

The 2008 financial crisis was identified as a threat to the goals envisioned by the charter. The most controversial part of the charter was the proposed human rights body, details of which were to be hammered out at the summit in February 2009. The body would not have the power to impose sanctions or punish countries that violate citizens' rights and would therefore be limited in effectiveness, this is said to be the effect of the ASEAN Charter saying that it is supposed to not interfere with local political issue of the member states.

== See also ==
- Bandung Conference#Declaration - principles of non-interference
