= ASEAN Summit =

Meeting of ASEAN member states

- Logo of ASEAN

- ASEAN member states shown in green
- Status: Active
- Genre: Diplomatic conference
- Frequency: Biannual
- Years active: 50
- Inaugurated: 23 February 1976
- Most recent: 18 November 2026

The ASEAN Summit is a biannual meeting held by the members of the Association of Southeast Asian Nations (ASEAN) in relation to economic, political, security, and socio-cultural development of Southeast Asian countries. In addition, it serves as a prominent regional (Asia) and international (worldwide) conference, with world leaders attending its related summits and meetings to discuss various problems and global issues, strengthening co-operation, and making decisions. The summit has been praised by world leaders for its success and ability to produce results on a global level.

The league of ASEAN is currently connected with other countries who aim to participate on the missions and visions of the league. The league conducts annual meetings with other countries in an organisation collectively known as the ASEAN dialogue partners. ASEAN +3 adds China, Japan, and South Korea.

The formal summits are held in three days. The usual itinerary are as follows:

- ASEAN leaders hold an internal organisation meeting.
- ASEAN leaders hold a conference together with foreign ministers of the ASEAN Regional Forum.
- Leaders of three ASEAN Dialogue Partners (also known as ASEAN +3), namely China, Japan, and South Korea, hold a meeting with the ASEAN leaders.
- And a separate meeting is set for leaders of two ASEAN Dialogue Partners (also known as ASEAN +CER), namely Australia and New Zealand.

== History ==
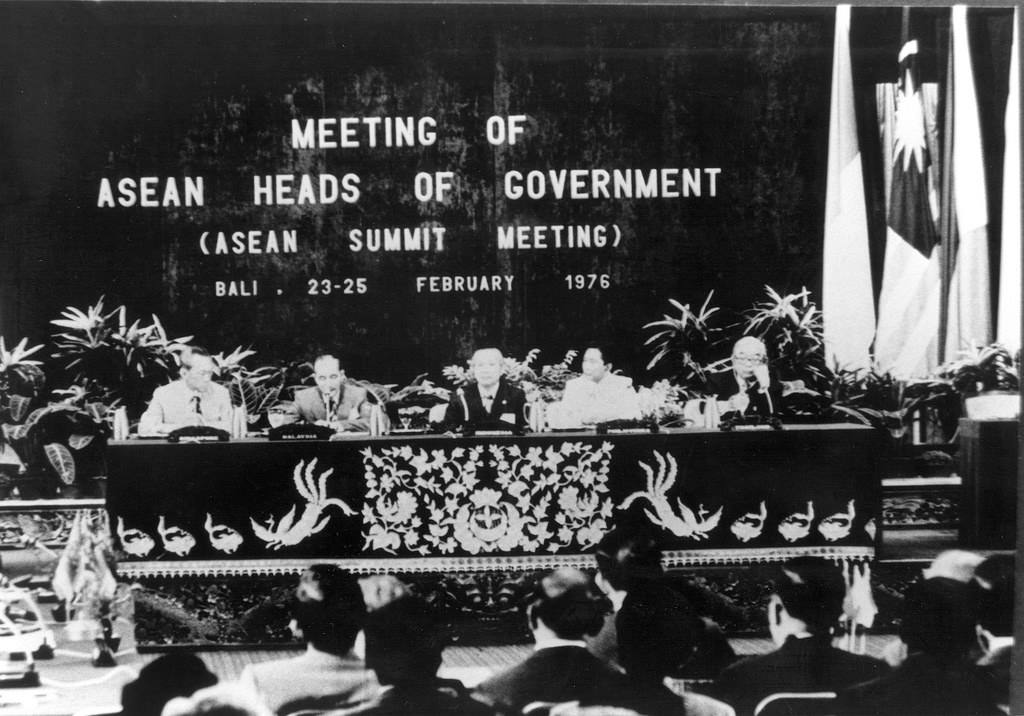
1st ASEAN Summit in Bali, in 1976

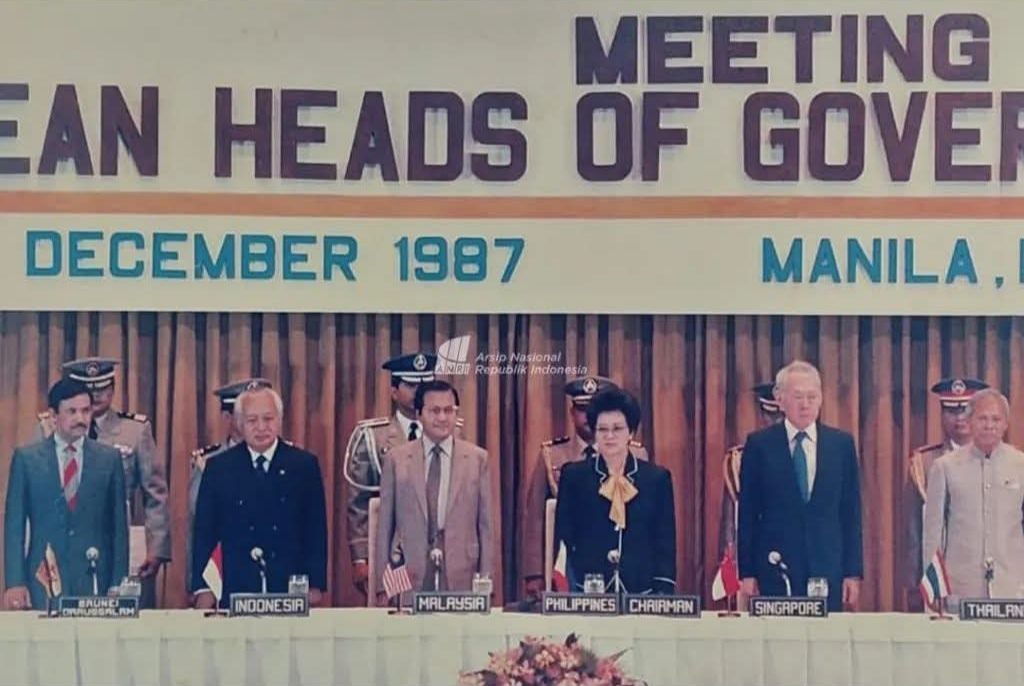
3rd ASEAN Summit in Manila, Philippines, in 1987

Family photo of ASEAN during the 49th ASEAN Summit in Metro Manila, Philippines, 15 November 2026

The 1st ASEAN Summit was held in February 1976 in Bali, Indonesia. At this summit, ASEAN expressed its readiness to "develop fruitful relations" and mutually beneficial co-operation with other countries of the region. The ASEAN leaders signed the Treaty of Amity and Cooperation in Southeast Asia. The 2nd ASEAN summit held in Kuala Lumpur, Malaysia in August 1977 was the occasion for the first summit meeting between Japan and ASEAN. Japan expressed its intention to promote co-operation with ASEAN.

At the 9th ASEAN Summit, a meeting in October 2003 in Bali, Indonesia, the leaders of the member states signed a declaration known as the Bali Concord II in which they agreed to pursue closer economic integration by 2020.

According to the declaration, "an ASEAN Community" would be set upon three pillars, "namely political and security cooperation, economic cooperation, and socio-cultural cooperation; For the purpose of ensuring durable peace, stability and shared prosperity in the region." The plan envisaged a region with a population of 500 million and annual trade of US$720 billion. Also, a free trade area would be established in the region by 2020. ASEAN's leaders also discussed setting up a security community alongside the economic one, though without any formal military alliance.

During the same meeting, China and ASEAN also agreed to work faster toward a mutual trade agreement which would create the world's most populous market, with 1.7 billion consumers. Japan also signed an agreement pledging to reduce tariff and non-tariff barriers with ASEAN members.

At the 11th ASEAN summit in December 2005 in Kuala Lumpur, Malaysia, several main issues were discussed:

- the spread of bird flu
- the South Thailand insurgency
- democracy in Myanmar
- crude oil prices fluctuation and poverty
- investment and trade
- ASEAN Charter

Immediately after the summit ended, the inaugural East Asia Summit was held.

The 12th ASEAN Summit was originally set to be hosted in Cebu in the Philippines in December 2006. However, on 8 December, organisers decided to move the summit schedule to January 2007 due to Typhoon Seniang hitting the area. Metro Cebu jointly hosted various events of the summit. The actual conference was held at the Cebu International Convention Centre in Mandaue, while the Shangri-La Mactan Island Resort & Spa in Lapu-Lapu City provided accommodations for delegates and venues for smaller meetings. At the summit, the member countries of ASEAN signed five agreements pertaining to continuing integration of ASEAN and enhancing political, economic, and social co-operation in the region:

- Cebu Declaration Towards a Caring and Sharing Community
- Cebu Declaration on the Blueprint for the ASEAN Charter
- Cebu Declaration on the Acceleration of the Establishment of an ASEAN Community by 2015
- ASEAN Declaration on the Protection and Promotion of the Rights of Migrant Workers
- ASEAN Convention on Counter Terrorism

The 13th ASEAN Summit was held in November 2007 in Singapore. The key theme of the discussions was set to be on "Energy, Environment, Climate Change and Sustainable Development". In line with the theme, the ASEAN Leaders' Declaration on Environmental Sustainability was signed at the summit and a proposal to work on a Singapore Declaration on the Environment was issued at the Third East Asia Summit. The leaders endorsed the ASEAN Economic Community Blueprint, which would help chart concrete targets for establishing a single market and production base in the ASEAN region by 2015. Other documents that were negotiated and signed include:

- ASEAN Mutual Recognition Agreement on Architectural Services
- ASEAN Framework Arrangement for the Mutual Recognition of Surveying Qualifications
- Protocol to Implement the Sixth Package of Commitments under the ASEAN Framework Agreement on Services
- Agreements on trade and areas of co-operation with ASEAN Dialogue Partners

The 15th ASEAN Summit was held in October 2009 in Hua Hin and Cha-am, Thailand. It involved the leaders of ASEAN member states together with their dialogue partners from China, Japan, South Korea, India, Australia, and New Zealand. A flurry of meetings among Asian leaders on the last day raised the possibility of forging a regional free trade pact, which is likely to be raised at the 2009 Asia Pacific Economic Cooperation summit.

The 28th and 29th ASEAN Summits were held in September 2016 in Vientiane, Laos. The year 2016 also marked the start off of the implementation of the ASEAN Community Vision 2025. Apart from the two main summits, other sideline summits under the umbrella of ASEAN were also held. There were nine Summits with ASEAN's Dialogue Partners under the ASEAN Plus One, ASEAN Plus Three, and East Asia Summit co-operation frameworks. Also, under the sub-regional co-operation framework, the Mekong-Japan Summit was held. This occasion also provided a platform for ASEAN Leaders to meet with Representatives of ASEAN Inter-Parliamentary Assembly (AIPA), Representatives of ASEAN Youth, and ASEAN Business Advisory Council. The main theme discussed at the summits was regarding the further commitment for the implementation of the ASEAN Community Vision 2025 and the three community Blueprints. ASEAN Leaders also signed the ASEAN Declaration on One ASEAN, One Response: ASEAN Responding to Disasters as One in the Region and Outside the Region.

Territorial disputes in the South China Sea also came atop among important agenda at the summit. At the summit, the Philippines and Japan expressed serious concerns over China's maritime territorial claims and building of artificial islands in the South China Sea. Japan's Prime Minister, Shinzo Abe, called for peaceful settlement of dispute between China and the Philippines. The Philippines' President, Rodrigo Duterte, reaffirmed at the meeting that the dispute should be solved "within the boundaries of the law, referring to the arbitral ruling under the Philippines v. China case by the Permanent Court of Arbitration in July 2016. The draft statement of meetings included lukewarm criticism over China's actions in the South China Sea. However, there were no statements about ASEAN's position on the arbitral ruling. No multilateral statement has been clearly made to reflect the voice of the ASEAN community as a whole on the South China Sea issues. China reiterated that there should be no interference and the issues should be dealt in a bilateral manner.

The preparatory meetings for the 48th ASEAN summit, due to be held in Cebu, Philippines, in May 2026, have been scaled back and held online, owing to the 2026 Iran war fuel crisis which is affecting the whole region. Energy security is a core topic for the meeting.

== ASEAN Summit ==
Under the ASEAN Charter, the ASEAN Summit is the supreme policy-making body of ASEAN. It comprises the heads of state or government of each member state. Accordingly, the Chairmanship of ASEAN rotates annually, based on the alphabetical order of the English names of ASEAN member states. The member state assuming the Chairmanship holds it for one calendar year, and chairs the ASEAN Summit and related summits, the ASEAN Coordinating Council, the three ASEAN Community Councils, relevant ASEAN Sectoral Ministerial Bodies and senior officials, and the Committee of Permanent Representatives. In addition, the Secretary General of the Association of Southeast Asian Nations is appointed by the ASEAN Summit, selected from among nationals of ASEAN member states based on alphabetical rotation. The Chairmanship of ASEAN for 2026 is held by Philippines.

Chairmanship of ASEAN

Member state	Representative	Member state	Representative	Member state	Representative
– Association of Southeast Asian Nations – Member since 9 January 2023 –	Secretary-General; Kao Kim Hourn ( Cambodia)	– Nation of Brunei, the Abode of Peace – Member since 7 January 1984	Sultan; Hassanal Bolkiah (House of Bolkiah)	– Kingdom of Cambodia – Member since 22 August 2023	Prime Minister; Hun Manet (CPP)
– Republic of Indonesia – Member since 20 October 2024	President; Prabowo Subianto (Gerindra)	– Lao People's Democratic Republic – Member since 5 October 2026	Prime Minister; Saleumxay Kommasith (LPRP)	– Malaysia – Member since 24 November 2022	Prime Minister; Anwar Ibrahim (PH-PKR)
– Republic of the Union of Myanmar – Member since 2 February 2021	President; Min Aung Hlaing	– Republic of the Philippines – Member since 30 June 2022	President; Bongbong Marcos (PFP)	– Republic of Singapore – Member since 15 May 2024	Prime Minister; Lawrence Wong (PAP)
– Kingdom of Thailand – Member since 7 September 2025	Prime Minister; Anutin Charnvirakul (BJT)	– Democratic Republic of Timor-Leste – Member since 26 October 2025	Prime Minister; Xanana Gusmão (CNRT)	– Socialist Republic of Vietnam – Member since 7 April 2026	Prime Minister; Lê Minh Hưng (CPV)

== ASEAN Summit Meetings ==
The ASEAN Summit Meetings are held by its ten member states annually. Under the ASEAN Charter, ASEAN Summit Meetings are held twice annually, to be hosted by the member state holding the ASEAN Chairmanship. Further special or ad hoc meetings may be convened whenever necessary, to be chaired by the member state holding the ASEAN Chairmanship at venues to be agreed upon by the ASEAN member states.

ASEAN Formal Summits
No.	Date	Host country	Host cities	Host leader
1st	23–24 February 1976	Indonesia	Bali	President Suharto
2nd	4–5 August 1977	Malaysia	Kuala Lumpur	Prime Minister Hussein Onn
3rd	14–15 December 1987	Philippines	Manila	President Corazon Aquino
4th	27–29 January 1992	Singapore	Singapore	Prime Minister Goh Chok Tong
5th	14–15 December 1995	Thailand	Bangkok	Prime Minister Banharn Silpa-archa
6th	15–16 December 1998	Vietnam	Hanoi	Prime Minister Phan Văn Khải
7th	5–6 November 2001	Brunei	Bandar Seri Begawan	Sultan Hassanal Bolkiah
8th	4–5 November 2002	Cambodia	Phnom Penh	Prime Minister Hun Sen
9th	7–8 October 2003	Indonesia	Bali	President Megawati Sukarnoputri
10th	29–30 November 2004	Laos	Vientiane	Prime Minister Bounnhang Vorachit
11th	12–14 December 2005	Malaysia	Kuala Lumpur	Prime Minister Abdullah Ahmad Badawi
12th	11–14 January 2007 (Note: Originally scheduled from 10‒14 December 2006, but rescheduled due to Typhoon Seniang.)	Philippines (Note: Chaired the summit because Myanmar backed out due to pressure from the United States and the European Union.)	Mandaue	President Gloria Macapagal Arroyo
13th	18–22 November 2007	Singapore	Singapore	Prime Minister Lee Hsien Loong
14th (Note: This summit consisted of two parts. The first part was moved from 12‒17 December 2008 due to the 2008 Thai political crisis. The second part was aborted on 11 April due to protesters entering the summit venue.)	27 February–1 March 2009	Thailand	Cha-am and Hua Hin	Prime Minister Abhisit Vejjajiva
14th	10–11 April 2009	Thailand	Pattaya	Prime Minister Abhisit Vejjajiva
15th	23–25 October 2009	Thailand	Cha-am and Hua Hin	Prime Minister Abhisit Vejjajiva
16th	8–9 April 2010	Vietnam	Hanoi	Prime Minister Nguyễn Tấn Dũng
17th	28–31 October 2010	Vietnam	Hanoi	Prime Minister Nguyễn Tấn Dũng
18th	7–8 May 2011	Indonesia (Note: Indonesia chaired in 2011 by swapping years with Brunei, as it played host to 2013 APEC Summit (along with the possibility of hosting the 2013 G20 summit, which ultimately fell to Russia).)	Jakarta	President Susilo Bambang Yudhoyono
19th	14–19 November 2011	Indonesia	Bali	President Susilo Bambang Yudhoyono
20th	3–4 April 2012	Cambodia	Phnom Penh	Prime Minister Hun Sen
21st	17–20 November 2012	Cambodia	Phnom Penh	Prime Minister Hun Sen
22nd	24–25 April 2013	Brunei	Bandar Seri Begawan	Sultan Hassanal Bolkiah
23rd	9–10 October 2013	Brunei	Bandar Seri Begawan	Sultan Hassanal Bolkiah
24th	10–11 May 2014	Myanmar	Naypyidaw	President Thein Sein
25th	12–13 November 2014	Myanmar	Naypyidaw	President Thein Sein
26th	26–27 April 2015	Malaysia	Kuala Lumpur and Langkawi	Prime Minister Mohammad Najib Abdul Razak
27th	18–22 November 2015	Malaysia	Kuala Lumpur	Prime Minister Mohammad Najib Abdul Razak
28th	6–8 September 2016	Laos	Vientiane	Prime Minister Thongloun Sisoulith
29th	6–8 September 2016	Laos	Vientiane	Prime Minister Thongloun Sisoulith
30th	28–29 April 2017	Philippines	Pasay	President Rodrigo Duterte
31st	10–14 November 2017	Philippines	Pasay	President Rodrigo Duterte
32nd	27–28 April 2018	Singapore	Singapore	Prime Minister Lee Hsien Loong
33rd	11–15 November 2018	Singapore	Singapore	Prime Minister Lee Hsien Loong
34th	20–23 June 2019	Thailand	Bangkok	Prime Minister Prayut Chan-o-cha
35th	31 October–4 November 2019	Thailand	Bangkok	Prime Minister Prayut Chan-o-cha
36th	26 June 2020	Vietnam	Hanoi (as Chair's venue) (Note: The 36th through 39th ASEAN Summits were held online due to the COVID-19 pandemic and hosted by the member states where the summits were initially scheduled to take place.)	Prime Minister Nguyễn Xuân Phúc
37th	11–15 November 2020	Vietnam	Hanoi (as Chair's venue)	Prime Minister Nguyễn Xuân Phúc
38th (Note: Myanmar chose not to attend the 38th to 43rd ASEAN Summits after its military leaders were barred from attending following the 2021 Myanmar coup d'état and protests. An invitation was extended for Myanmar to send a "non-political representative", but chose not to send one.)	26–28 October 2021	Brunei	Bandar Seri Begawan (as Chair's venue)	Sultan Hassanal Bolkiah
39th	26–28 October 2021	Brunei	Bandar Seri Begawan (as Chair's venue)	Sultan Hassanal Bolkiah
40th	10–13 November 2022	Cambodia	Phnom Penh	Prime Minister Hun Sen
41st	10–13 November 2022	Cambodia	Phnom Penh	Prime Minister Hun Sen
42nd	9–11 May 2023	Indonesia	Labuan Bajo	President Joko Widodo
43rd	5–7 September 2023	Indonesia	Jakarta	President Joko Widodo
44th	6–11 October 2024	Laos	Vientiane	Prime Minister Sonexay Siphandone
45th	6–11 October 2024	Laos	Vientiane	Prime Minister Sonexay Siphandone
46th	26–27 May 2025	Malaysia	Kuala Lumpur	Prime Minister Anwar Ibrahim
47th	26–28 October 2025	Malaysia	Kuala Lumpur	Prime Minister Anwar Ibrahim
48th	6–8 May 2026	Philippines (Note: Myanmar skipped its turn in chairing in 2026 due to the ongoing Myanmar civil war. The Philippines, as the next country in alphabetical rotation, accepted the chair.)	Cebu City	President Bongbong Marcos
49th	16–18 November 2026	Philippines	Manila	President Bongbong Marcos
50th	22 April–2 May 2027	Singapore	Singapore	Prime Minister Lawrence Wong (expected)
51st	8–15 November 2027	Singapore	Singapore	Prime Minister Lawrence Wong (expected)
52th	TBA 2028	Thailand	TBA	
53th	TBA 2028	Thailand	TBA	
54th	TBA 2029	Timor-Leste	TBA	
55th	TBA 2029	Timor-Leste	TBA	
56th	TBA 2030	Vietnam	TBA	
57th	TBA 2030	Vietnam	TBA	

During the fifth summit in Bangkok, the leaders decided to meet "informally" between each formal summit.

ASEAN Informal Summits
No	Date	Country	Host	Host leader
1st	30 November 1996	Indonesia	Jakarta	President Suharto
2nd	14‒16 December 1997	Malaysia	Kuala Lumpur	Prime Minister Mahathir Mohamad
3rd	27‒28 November 1999	Philippines	Pasay	President Joseph Estrada
4th	22‒25 November 2000	Singapore	Singapore	Prime Minister Goh Chok Tong

After 2004 Indian Ocean earthquake and tsunami, ASEAN members held a special summit at the ASEAN Secretariat in Jakarta, led by Malaysia as ASEAN chairman that year. In 2020, during its year of chairmanship, Vietnam hosted a Special ASEAN summit and Special ASEAN+3 summit on COVID-19.

ASEAN Special Summit
Name	Date	Country	Location	Leader
Special ASEAN Leaders' Meeting on Aftermath of Earthquake and Tsunami	6 January 2005	Indonesia	Jakarta (ASEAN Secretariat)	Prime Minister Abdullah Ahmad Badawi
Special ASEAN summit on COVID-19	14 April 2020	Vietnam	Hanoi (as Chair's venue)	Prime Minister Nguyễn Xuân Phúc
ASEAN Leaders' Meeting – COVID-19 Pandemic, External Relations & Common Interest	24 April 2021	Indonesia	Jakarta (ASEAN Secretariat)	Sultan Hassanal Bolkiah

== Issues ==
=== 14th ASEAN Summit and Protest ===
The 14th ASEAN summit was held from February to March 2009 in Hua Hin, Thailand. It was originally scheduled for December 2008, but was postponed due to the 2008 Thai political crisis. At the summit, ASEAN leaders signed the Cha-am Hua Hin Declaration on the Roadmap for an ASEAN Community and adopted various other documents, including the ASEAN Political-Security Community Blueprint and the ASEAN Socio-Cultural Community Blueprint. The summit was reconvened in Pattaya, Thailand in April 2009. This second part of the summit was to consist of various meetings between the ASEAN members and one or more non-ASEAN countries from 10 to 12 April. However, it was aborted on 11 April when hundreds of protesters forced their way past security forces into the venue. Many of the visiting leaders had to be evacuated from the venue by helicopter to a nearby military airbase, although none were injured. The protests were part of the 2008 Thai political crisis and were not believed to be directed at ASEAN leaders, but rather at Thailand's government.

=== Timor-Leste ===
The new nation of Timor-Leste, previously ruled by Indonesia, has had a long struggle with ASEAN. Timor-Leste, during its long process towards independence, has sought to have observer status in ASEAN, much like Papua New Guinea, and eventually official member status. Historically, ASEAN countries supported Indonesia over Timor-Leste, with the Philippines and Malaysia barring overseas NGOs from participating in Timor-Leste conferences in the late 1990s. More recently, Myanmar opposed granting observer status to Timor-Leste because of the latter's support for opposition leader Aung San Suu Kyi.

In 2002, Timor-Leste was recognised as an observer of ASEAN and joined the ASEAN Regional Forum in 2005. In December 2005, the government of Timor-Leste stated that the nation would be a member of ASEAN by 2011.

The nation's then-President, Xanana Gusmão, had already applied for membership at the 39th Annual Ministerial Meeting of ASEAN Foreign Ministers held in Kuala Lumpur in 2006. However, the request is still pending as of July 2019. The reason for the delay in membership is the protest on (increase in per cent tax per import or export of online retail products) but taxes are divided half to two country doing exchange and by a ruling currency percentage ASEAN tax.

During the 41st ASEAN Summit in 2022, Timor-Leste was admitted "in principle", gaining observer status in all high-level ASEAN meetings, although Timor-Leste President José Ramos-Horta noted that it would take years to gain full membership. In 2023, a roadmap to membership was presented, including a number of steps that the country would need to fulfill, such as the capacity to host large meetings and sufficient English-speaking government staff. Timor-Leste officially joined ASEAN during the 47th ASEAN Summit in October 2025.

=== Myanmar (Burma) ===
Prior to the 10th ASEAN Summit, Myanmar had taken steps to rehabilitate itself by releasing up to 9,000 prisoners who were imprisoned under the old junta. Myanmar's new leader General Soe Win attended the conference and foreign minister Nyan Win had already made pre-summit press releases on Myanmar's continuing commitment for the roadmap to democracy.

Myanmar was due to hold the chair of ASEAN in 2006. This however had attracted criticism from various factions. The United States and the European Union publicly announced that they might boycott any ASEAN-related event if Myanmar was the chair. In July 2005, during an ASEAN foreign minister meeting in Vientiane, Myanmar decided to postpone its turn. The Philippines, the country next in line, instead held the ASEAN chairmanship in 2006.

Apart from the United States, various ASEAN lawmakers have called Myanmar's membership to be stripped due to its poor human rights record.

Following the 2021 Myanmar coup d'état in which the Tatmadaw—Myanmar's military—ousted the country's democratically elected leaders, widespread protests broke out in response to the coup and the military's subsequent use of force on civilians. ASEAN called for a special ASEAN Leaders Meeting in Jakarta on 24 April 2021, with the military junta's leader Min Aung Hlaing in attendance along with other member states' heads of government and foreign ministers. Members of the National Unity Government formed in response to the coup and consisting of ousted lawmakers were reported to have been in contact with ASEAN leaders, but were not formally invited to the meeting. ASEAN released a statement that it had agreed to a "five-point consensus" with Min Aung Hlaing on the cessation of violence in Myanmar, constructive dialogue among all parties concerned, and the appointment of a special envoy by ASEAN to facilitate the dialogue process. However, after continued violence in the country and non-committal by Myanmar's military government to the "five-point consensus", its military leaders were barred from attending the 40th to 45th ASEAN Summits from 2022 to 2024. For the 44th through 47th ASEAN Summits, Myanmar chose to send its Permanent Secretary of Foreign Affairs, although its military leaders remained barred from attending the summit.

=== Thailand ===
Prior to the 10th ASEAN summit, Thai Prime Minister Thaksin Shinawatra publicly threatened to walk out of the meeting if any member states raised the issue of the Thai government's handling of the insurgency in south Thailand. He stated "If the topic is raised, I will fly back home". This is notable since leaders have often shown solidarity with each other over high-profile issues such as East Timor and the handling by Myanmar of Aung San Suu Kyi. Furthermore, one of the principles on which ASEAN was founded is a stated principle of non-interference in the internal affairs of other member states, as enshrined in the Treaty of Amity and Cooperation in Southeast Asia. Any tension has been kept from the public view and leaders have avoided confrontational statements in public.

Indonesia (the world's most populous Muslim country) and Malaysia, however, were particularly vehement in their condemnation over the Thai government's handling of the events in south Thailand, with a former Malaysian Prime minister going to the extent of suggesting that the Southern Thai states should be given autonomy power. The Malaysian foreign minister further was quoted as saying that there is no such thing as absolute non-interference. It is thought that Thaksin's statement was made following the Malaysian government's passing of an opposition resolution condemning the Thai government for the death of at least 85 Muslim protestors in southern Thailand.

Laotian spokesman Yong Chanthalangsy stated "I think we have a golden rule, that is non-interference in the internal affairs of each other." He added "It is a courtesy among the leaders, among the ministers, that if one of the leaders does not wish to discuss a question, all the leaders will respect it."

== Free Trade Area ==
In 2004, Australia and New Zealand started the negotiation for a free trade deal with ASEAN. The ASEAN-Australia-New Zealand Free Trade Area was established at the 14th ASEAN Summit in 2009. It is one of Asia's largest trade arrangements and covers trade in goods, investment and services, financial services, telecommunications, electronic commerce, and intellectual property. The aim of the negotiation is to significantly reduce trade barriers by 2016.

== Treaty of Amity and Cooperation ==
ASEAN's Treaty of Amity and Cooperation in Southeast Asia is open for non-ASEAN states to accede. It requires the contracting parties to forgo any threat or use of force against each other.

The foreign ministers of ASEAN member states determined that invitation to the inaugural East Asia Summit, the first of which was held in late 2005 and hosted by Malaysia, was to be restricted to parties to the treaty. The Howard Government in Australia, although seeking invitation, was reluctant to accede to the treaty, claiming that it was out of date and might conflict with obligations and rights it had under other treaties. However, with entry to the summit confined to parties to the treaty, and with domestic pressure to sign, Australia decided in early 2005 to sign the treaty on the condition that its rights under the Charter of the United Nations are recognised as inalienable. Upon the announcement of accession, Australian Foreign Minister Alexander Downer was asked whether or not he considered himself an East Asian; he replied: "Do I consider myself an East Asian? ... I consider myself an Australian."
