= Treaty of Amity and Cooperation in Southeast Asia =

1976 treaty among Southeast Asian countries

The Treaty of Amity and Cooperation in Southeast Asia (TAC) is a peace treaty among Southeast Asian countries established by the founding members of the Association of Southeast Asian Nations (ASEAN), a geo-political and economic organisation of 11 countries located in Southeast Asia.

== History ==
On 24 February 1976, the treaty was signed into force by the leaders of the original members of ASEAN. Other members acceded to it upon or before joining the bloc. It was amended on 15 December 1987 by a protocol to open the document for accession by states outside Southeast Asia, and again on 25 July 1998, to condition such accession on the consent of all member states. On 23 July 2001, the parties established the rules of procedure of the treaty's High Council, which was stipulated in Article 14 of the document. On 7 October 2003, during the annual summit, a declaration was released that says:

"A High Council of [the treaty] shall be the important component in the ASEAN Security Community since it reflects ASEAN's commitment to resolve all differences, disputes and conflicts peacefully."

Papua New Guinea was the first country outside ASEAN to sign the treaty in 1989. As of July 2009, sixteen countries outside the bloc have acceded to the treaty. On 22 July 2009, Secretary of State Hillary Clinton signed the TAC on behalf of the United States. The European Union announced in 2009 its intention to accede as soon as the treaty would be amended to allow for the accession of non-states and joined accordingly on 12 July 2012.

The treaty has been endorsed by the General Assembly stating that:

"The purposes and principles of the Treaty of Amity and Cooperation in Southeast Asia and its provisions for the pacific settlement of regional disputes and for regional co-operation to achieve peace, amity and friendship among the peoples of Southeast Asia [are] in accordance with the Charter of the United Nations."

== Principles ==
The purpose of the Treaty is to promote perpetual peace, everlasting amity and co-operation among the people of Southeast Asia which would contribute to their strength, solidarity, and closer relationship. In their relations with one another, the High Contracting Parties shall be guided by the following fundamental principles;

a. mutual respect for the independence, sovereignty, equality, territorial integrity and national identity of all nations,

b. the right of every State to lead its national existence free from external interference, subversion or coercion,

c. non-interference in the internal affairs of one another,

d. settlement of differences or disputes by peaceful means,

e. renunciation of the threat or use of force, and

f. effective co-operation among themselves.

== Parties ==
The following table lists the parties in the order of the dates on which they entered into the treaty:

No	Country	Date
1	Indonesia	24 February 1976
2	Malaysia	24 February 1976
3	Philippines	24 February 1976
4	Singapore	24 February 1976
5	Thailand	24 February 1976
6	Brunei	7 January 1984
7	Papua New Guinea	6 July 1989
8	Laos	29 June 1992
9	Vietnam	22 July 1992
10	Cambodia	23 January 1995
11	Myanmar	27 July 1995
12	China	8 October 2003
13	India	8 October 2003
14	Japan	2 July 2004
15	Pakistan	2 July 2004
16	South Korea	27 November 2004
17	Russia	29 November 2004
18	New Zealand	25 July 2005
19	Mongolia	28 July 2005
20	Australia	10 December 2005
21	France	20 July 2006
22	Timor-Leste	13 January 2007
23	Bangladesh	1 August 2007
24	Sri Lanka	1 August 2007
25	North Korea	24 July 2008
26	United States	23 July 2009
27	Canada	23 July 2010
28	Turkey	23 July 2010
29	European Union	12 July 2012
30	United Kingdom	12 July 2012
31	Brazil	17 November 2012
32	Norway	1 July 2013
33	Chile	6 September 2016
34	Egypt	6 September 2016
35	Morocco	6 September 2016
36	Argentina	1 August 2018
37	Iran	1 August 2018
38	Peru	31 July 2019
39	Bahrain	2 November 2019
40	Germany	2 November 2019
41	Colombia	10 November 2020
42	Cuba	10 November 2020
43	South Africa	10 November 2020
44	Denmark	3 August 2022
45	Greece	3 August 2022
46	Netherlands	3 August 2022
47	Oman	3 August 2022
48	Qatar	3 August 2022
49	United Arab Emirates	3 August 2022
50	Ukraine	10 November 2022
51	Saudi Arabia	12 July 2023
52	Kuwait	4 September 2023
53	Panama	4 September 2023
54	Serbia	4 September 2023
55	Luxembourg	10 October 2024
56	Algeria	9 July 2025
57	Uruguay	9 July 2025
58	Finland	25 October 2025
59	Lithuania	24 July 2026
60	Poland	24 July 2026
61	Romania	24 July 2026
62	Sweden	24 July 2026
63	Cyprus	14 November 2026
64	Slovakia	14 November 2026
65	Slovenia	14 November 2026

Even though Spain was recognised as a member of the treaty on 10 November 2022, they have yet to ratify their accession. Secretary of state at Cambodia's Ministry of Foreign Affairs Kung Phoak stated that Spain's efforts to join the treaty are moving slowly.
