= Mactan Newtown Beach Walk =

Shopping mall in the Philippines

- Location: Lapu-Lapu City
- Coordinates: 10°18′29″N 124°0′40″E
- Address: Mactan Circumferential Road, Lapu-Lapu City
- Opened: 2023; 3 years ago
- Developer: Megaworld Corporation
- Manager: Megaworld Lifestyle Malls
- Floor area: 30,000 square metres (320,000 sq ft)
- Floors: 2
- Public transit: MI-01A 23 Punta Engaño; MI-02B Marigondon; CT ST IT Park

Mactan Newtown Beach Walk is a shopping mall to be constructed in Mactan Newtown, Mactan Circumferential Road, Lapu-Lapu City.

== History ==
On September 19, 2019, Megaworld Corporation announced that their plan to build a PHP 1.5 billion two-level mall in its 30-hectare Mactan Newtown development in Lapu-Lapu City, Cebu. It will have a 1.4-hectare man-made lagoon at the center with floating boardwalks and a bridge that will connect both sides of the mall. It will also have its own chapel, four cinemas, a food hall, al fresco areas, traveler's lounge and a view deck.

The mall will be operated by Megaworld Lifestyle Malls. A three-storey boutique hotel with 48 guestrooms will also be part of the mall complex. The mall was expected to be completed in 2021. However, due to the COVID-19 pandemic, the opening was delayed to 2023.
