= Emblem of ASEAN =

Emblem of the Association of Southeast Asian Nations
- Emblem
- Alternative name: The ASEAN Emblem
- Adopted: 1979 (original emblem); 2026 (current iteration)
- Shield: Set upon a red circle background, eleven yellow paddy or rice stalks—each representing a member country—are drawn in the middle. Under the rice stalks the organisation name abbreviation "asean" is written in lower case Helvetica font in blue. The red circle is drawn with a white and blue circumference.

The Emblem of the Association of Southeast Asian Nations, also known as the ASEAN Emblem or ASEAN Logo, is the emblem of ASEAN adopted in 1979.

The current iteration was adopted on 31 May 1997 together with the ASEAN flag. It was then revised on 15 November 2026 to reflect the admission of Timor-Leste.

== History ==
The ASEAN emblem traces its roots to a logo by Mohammad Radzi Hanif of Malaysia. His logo was a winning entry of a design competition held from 1977 to 1978, when Hanif was still a design student at the MARA Institute of Technology (now Universiti Teknologi MARA) in Shah Alam, Selangor. ASEAN at the time still had five members. The ASEAN logo was adopted in 1979.

The logo was based on a sheaf of paddy, or specifically the result of the practice of farmers of reaping and binding called segemal padi in Malay.

On 31 May 1997, the same year which Laos and Myanmar became ASEAN members, the ASEAN flag and emblem was introduced. Priorly, a design competition was held for a new logo with five winning entries picked among 3,000 entries. However, ASEAN opted to just increase the number of stalks in the emblem to ten.

On 15 November 2026, a new logo was unveiled at the opening ceremonies of the 49th ASEAN Summit in Pasay, Philippines. While retaining the same overall design, the number of stalks has been increased to eleven following the admission of Timor-Leste as a full member of the bloc.

== Design ==
=== Construction ===
Set upon a red circle background, eleven yellow paddy or rice stalks are drawn in the middle. Under the rice stalks the organisation name abbreviation 'asean' is written in lowercase bold Helvetica font in blue. The red circle is drawn with a white and blue circumference.

The colours of the emblem are specified as follows:

Scheme	Blue	Red	Yellow	White
Pantone	Pantone 286	Pantone Red 032	Pantone Process Yellow	Plain White
RGB Approx.	#0032A0	#EF3340	#F8E600	#FFFFFF
CMYK Approx.	100, 80, 0, 12	0, 90, 76, 0	0, 0, 100, 0	0, 0, 0, 0

=== Symbolism ===
As per the ASEAN Guidelines adopted in 2010 set at the 6th Meeting of the ASEAN Coordinating Council (ACC), the ASEAN emblem represents a stable, peaceful, united and dynamic ASEAN.

1. The colours of the Emblem – blue, red, white and yellow – represent the main colours of the state crests of all the ASEAN Member States.
2. Blue represents peace and stability, red depicts courage and dynamism, white shows purity and yellow symbolises prosperity.
3. The eleven bound stalks of rice in the centre of the Emblem represent the member states of ASEAN (Note: All ten member states of ASEAN the time of the emblem's adaptation. Timor-Leste has since joined ASEAN in October 2025.). They represent the dream of ASEAN's Founding Fathers for an ASEAN comprising all the countries in Southeast Asia, bound together in friendship and solidarity.
4. The circle represents the unity of ASEAN.

The paddy stalk as originally designed by Mohammad Radzi Hanif represents ASEAN unity and was used as a motif since rice is a major staple in Southeast Asia. The logo originally designed in yellow ochre evokes "mature paddy" envisioning that ASEAN member states can only grow by depending on each other.

== See also ==
- Flag of the Association of Southeast Asian Nations
