= Flag of ASEAN =

Flag of Association of Southeast Asian Nations
- Official ASEAN flag featuring 11 rice stalks, symbolizing the 11 member states.
- Proportion: 2:3
- Adopted: 31 May 1997 (current design); 15 November 2026 (current version)
- Design: The ASEAN Emblem on a blue background.

The Flag of the Association of Southeast Asian Nations or the ASEAN Flag is one of the official symbols of the Association of Southeast Asian Nations (ASEAN). It consists of the official emblem of ASEAN on a blue background.

== History ==
The ASEAN flag features the organization's logo or emblem. The logo is a winning entry of a design competition held from 1977 to 1978. The symbol was created by Mohammad Radzi Hanif, then a design student from the MARA Institute of Technology of Malaysia.

ASEAN's first flag was similar to the current one – it had six paddy stalks representing the five founding members (Indonesia, Malaysia, Philippines, Singapore, and Thailand), plus Brunei Darussalam (joined on 7 January 1984) and the word ASEAN written under the stalks. The background was white instead of blue, the border of the circle along with the word ASEAN was cyan, and the circle was bright yellow. The stalks themselves were golden brownish in colour.

The preceding flag was adopted on 23 July 1994 at the ASEAN Ministerial Meeting in Bangkok.

The general design of the current flag with the blue field was adopted on 31 May 1997 at the Special Meeting of the ASEAN Foreign Ministers in Kuala Lumpur. This was updated on 15 November 2026 at the opening of the 46th ASEAN Summit, following the admission of Timor Leste to the bloc. The number of stalks was increased to eleven to reflect the updated membership.

First Flag of ASEAN
(7 January 1984 – 23 July 1994)

Second Flag of ASEAN
(23 July 1994 – 31 May 1997)

Third Flag of ASEAN
(31 May 1997 – 15 November 2026)

Current Flag of ASEAN
(15 November 2026 – present)

== Design ==
=== Construction ===
Set upon a blue background, eleven paddy or rice stalks are drawn in the middle of a red circle with white circumference.

The colours of the flag are specified as follows:

Scheme	Blue	Red	Yellow	White
Pantone	Pantone 286	Pantone Red 032	Pantone Process Yellow	Plain White
RGB Approx.	#0032A0	#EF3340	#F8E600	#FFFFFF
CMYK Approx.	100, 80, 0, 12	0, 90, 76, 0	0, 0, 100, 0	0, 0, 0, 0

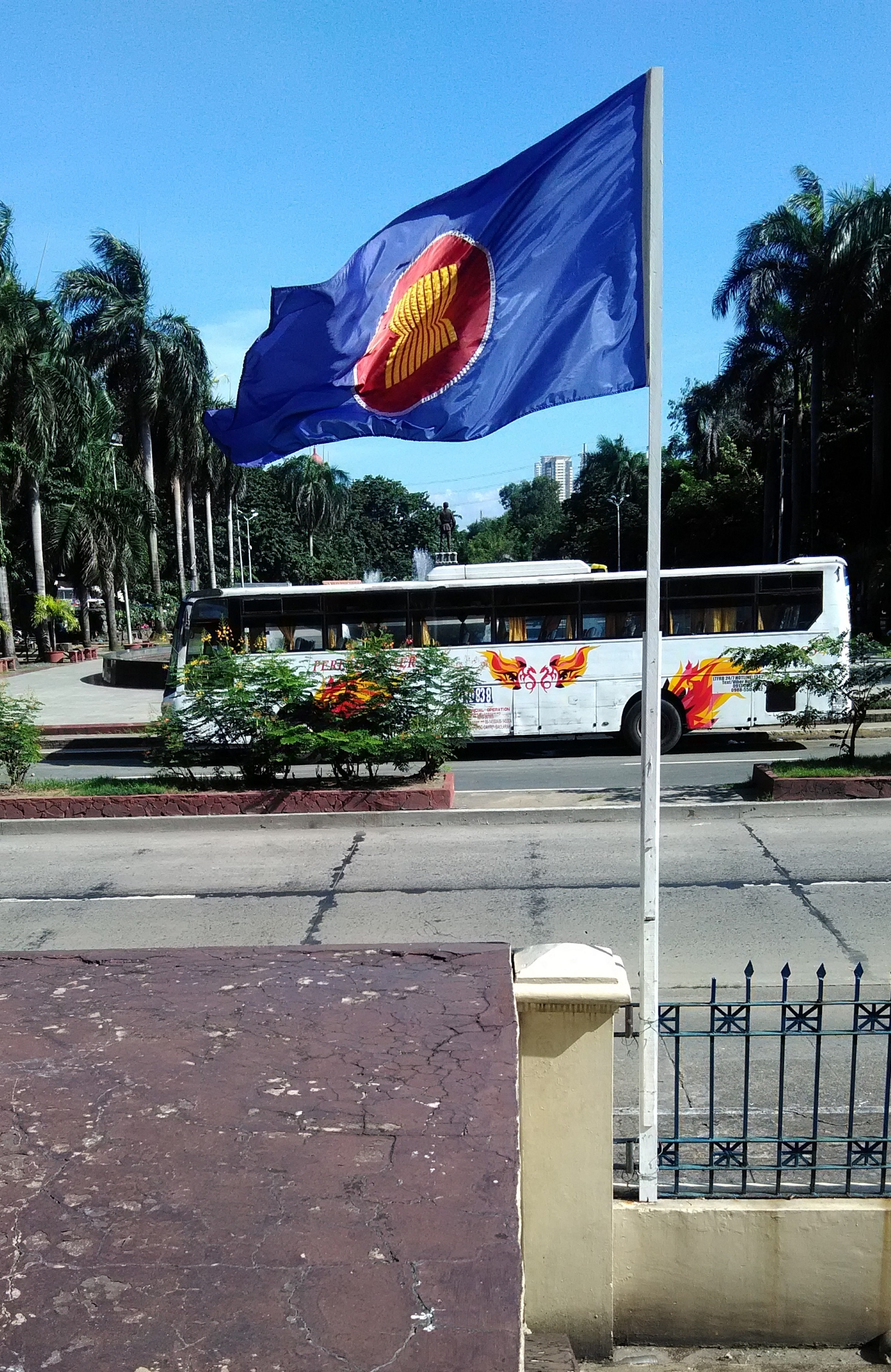
ASEAN flag in front of the Central Post Office building in Manila.

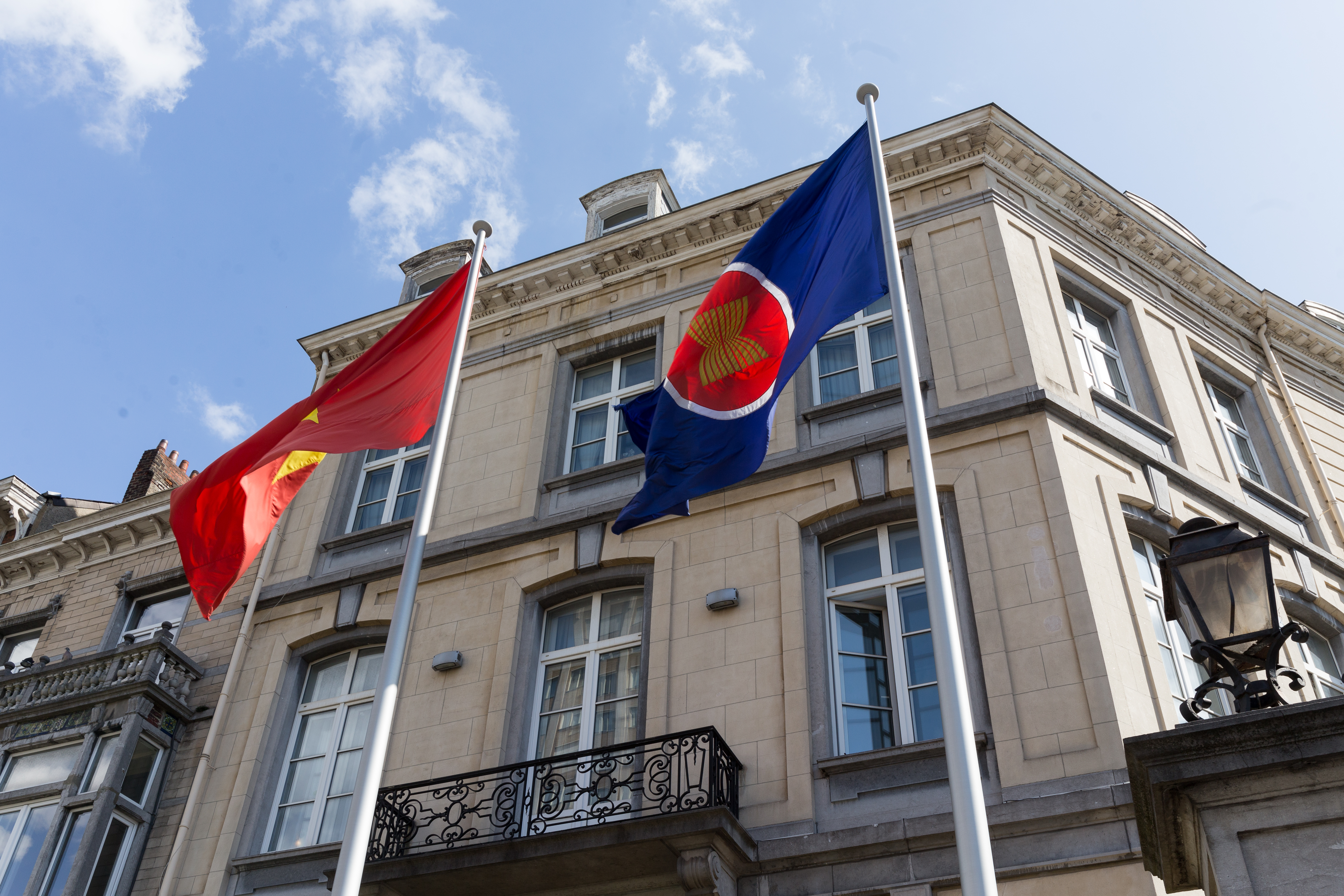
The ASEAN flag is flown alongside the national flag of Vietnam at the Vietnamese Embassy in Belgium.

The ratio of width to length of the flag is 2:3. The ASEAN Charter includes size specifications for usage of the flag:

- Table flag: 10 cm x 15 cm
- Room flag: 100 cm x 150 cm
- Car flag: 20 cm x 30 cm
- Field flag: 200 cm x 300 cm

=== Symbolism ===
The official symbolism of the flag is detailed in the ASEAN Charter.

The colours of the flag – blue, red, white, and yellow – represent the main colours of the national flags of all ASEAN member states at the time of the current flag's adoption. Blue represents peace and stability, red represents courage and dynamism, white represents purity, and yellow represents prosperity.

The stalks of rice represent the dream of ASEAN's Founding Fathers for an ASEAN comprising all the countries in Southeast Asia bound together in friendship and solidarity. The number of stalks symbolize ASEAN members at the time of the current flag's adoption.

The circle represents the unity of ASEAN.
