= Shangri-La's Mactan Resort & Spa, Cebu =

Shangri-La Mactan, Cebu
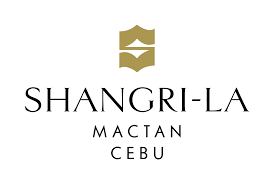
- Interactive map of the Shangri-La Mactan, Cebu area

General information
- Status: Completed
- Type: Hotel
- Location: Punta Engaño Road, Lapu-Lapu, Cebu, 6015, Philippines
- Coordinates: 10.307954°N 124.019512°E
- Opening: October 18, 1993; 32 years ago
- Owner: Shangri-La Hotels
- Management: René D. Egle

Design and construction
- Architects: Francisco Mañosa and Partners

Other information
- Number of rooms: 541

Shangri-La Mactan, Cebu is a 5-star resort owned by Shangri-La Hotels and Resorts located on the island of Mactan, Cebu, Philippines. The hotel measures 13 hectares, has 541 guest rooms and suites, a 6-hole golf course, two outdoor swimming pools, a private man-made beach cove, and a 6-hectare marine sanctuary with over 100 kinds of fish and corals.

== History ==
Shangri-La's Mactan was established by Wolf Dieter Flecker on October 23, 1993. Over time, the resort expanded, incorporating features such as the Ocean Wing, a fish sanctuary, palm trees, and lagoon pools.

In 2007, the hotel commenced a renovation program to align with the 14th ASEAN summit, enhancing 188 rooms in the Ocean Wing. Following this, a phased renewal initiative between 2012 and 2013 introduced new room categories and makeovers, involving an expenditure of P718 million ($16.5 million).

It has been a venue for international events, such as the Miss Universe pre-pageant, APEC summit, and ASEAN Leader's Summit.

== Design and construction ==
The hotel's architectural design by Francisco Mañosa and Partners focused on integration with the natural surroundings. The hotel's facades were intentionally sloped to harmonize with the coconut palms, avoiding an imposing appearance and blends with the environment.

The interior design was created by Dale Keller & Associates. The in-room furniture and decor, made from teak and mother-of-pearl to showcase Philippine craftsmanship. These elements are applied to capiz headboards, timber flooring, and decorative fretwork lamps.

The landscaping of the resort was undertaken by Belt Collins International (HK) Limited. The shoreline was restructured to establish a sheltered, artificial beach.

== Features ==
=== Rooms and suites ===
The hotel has 541 rooms, categorized into the Main and Ocean Wings. Ocean Club floor rooms grant guests personalized concierge service and admission to the Ocean Club Lounge.

During a three-phase renovation program, a total of 354 rooms in the main wing of the resort were refurbished.

=== Restaurants ===
The resort offers four restaurants, along with bars and a Lobby Lounge.

=== CHI, The Spa ===
The CHI Spa Village was established in June 2005 and comprises six private villas, each spanning 135 square meters, along with treatment pavilions and garden suites. Encompassing an area of 10,000 square meters, the spa complex includes facilities such as herbal steam rooms and a spa pool.

== Awards ==
The property is recommended by major media like Conde Nast Traveler, Expedia, Asia Money and TIME magazine, winning awards each year. It was voted "The Favorite Resort Hotel in Asia" for three consecutive years from 2004 by TIME magazine's readers.

- Best Asia Hotel in the Philippines, Travel + Leisure "T+L 500" (USA), 2010
- Asia's Leading Beach Resort, World Travel Awards, 2009
- Asean Green Hotel Award, 2008
- Philippines’ Leading Resort, World Travel Awards, 2006

== See also ==
- Shangri-La Hotels and Resorts
