= Member states of ASEAN =

██ ASEAN full member states ██ ASEAN observer state ██ ASEAN Plus Three ███ East Asia Summit █████ ASEAN Regional Forum

As of 2026, the Association of Southeast Asian Nations (ASEAN) has 11 member states and one observer state.

ASEAN was founded on 8 August 1967 with five member states: Indonesia, Malaysia, the Philippines, Singapore, and Thailand. It is headquartered in Jakarta, Indonesia.

== Lists ==
A list of member states is provided below. The members of ASEAN Plus Three and the East Asia Summit are also listed. Both forums are ASEAN-led and meetings are held following the ASEAN Summit.

Also listed are participants of the ASEAN Regional Forum (ARF), an organisation throughout the Asia–Pacific region whose objectives are to foster dialogue and consultation, and promote confidence-building and preventive diplomacy in the region.

The ASEAN is an organisation on the Southeast Asian region that aims to accelerate economic growth, social progress, and cultural development among its members and to promote regional peace.

== ASEAN member states ==
Country	Capital	Area (km^{2})	Population	Density (/km^{2})	GDP (PPP)	HDI	Currency	Official languages	Leaders		Accession	Joined the ASEAN Regional Forum
Country	Capital	Area (km^{2})	Population	Density (/km^{2})	GDP (PPP)	HDI	Currency	Official languages	Head of state	Head of government	Accession	Joined the ASEAN Regional Forum
Brunei	Bandar Seri Begawan	5,765	411,900	65	29,731	0.837	Brunei dollar (BND; B$)	Malay	Hassanal Bolkiah		7 January 1984	1994
Cambodia	Phnom Penh	181,035	15,626,444	78	78,065	0.606	Cambodian riel (KHR; ៛) (Note: de jure and de facto); United States dollar (USD; $) (Note: de facto)	Khmer	Norodom Sihamoni	Hun Manet	30 April 1999	1995
Indonesia	Jakarta	1,904,569	255,975,000	113	3,507,239	0.728	Indonesian rupiah (IDR; Rp)	Indonesian	Prabowo Subianto		8 August 1967	1994
Laos	Vientiane	236,800	6,492,400	24	62,797	0.617	Lao kip (LAK; ₭)	Lao	Thongloun Sisoulith	Sonexay Siphandone	23 July 1997	1994
Malaysia	Kuala Lumpur	329,847	31,427,096	72	978,781	0.819	Malaysian ringgit (MYR; RM)	Malay	Ibrahim	Anwar Ibrahim	8 August 1967	1994
Myanmar	Naypyidaw	676,578	51,419,420	81	258,677	0.609	Burmese kyat (MMK; K)	Burmese	Min Aung Hlaing		23 July 1997	1996
Philippines	Manila	343,448	103,371,800	295	1,000,617	0.720	Philippine peso (PHP; ₱)	Filipino and English	Bongbong Marcos		8 August 1967	1994
Singapore	Singapore	707.1	5,535,000	6,619	952,600	0.946	Singapore dollar (SGD; S$)	English, Malay, Mandarin, and Tamil	Tharman Shanmugaratnam	Lawrence Wong	8 August 1967	1994
Thailand	Bangkok	513,115	65,339,612	126	1,329,324	0.798	Thai baht (THB; ฿)	Thai	Vajiralongkorn	Anutin Charnvirakul	8 August 1967	1994
Timor-Leste	Dili	14,874	1,231,116	76.2	4,928	0.634	United States dollar (USD; $); Timor-Leste Centavo	Tetum and Portuguese	José Ramos-Horta	Xanana Gusmão	26 October 2025	2005
Vietnam	Hanoi	331,690	99,000,000	248	1,148,054	0.766	Vietnamese đồng (VND; ₫)	Vietnamese	Tô Lâm	Lê Minh Hưng	28 July 1995	1994
ASEAN (total)	Jakarta (headquarters)	4,479,210	673,655,000	135	5,869	0.729 (UNDP cal.)	—	English (Working language)	Kao Kim Hourn (Secretary-general)		—N/a	—N/a

== Non-member states ==
=== ASEAN observer states ===
Country	Capital	Area (km^{2})	Population	Density (/km^{2})	GDP per cap. (PPP)	HDI	Currency	Official languages	Leaders		Status	Joined the ASEAN Regional Forum
Country	Capital	Area (km^{2})	Population	Density (/km^{2})	GDP per cap. (PPP)	HDI	Currency	Official languages	Head of state	Head of government	Status	Joined the ASEAN Regional Forum
Papua New Guinea	Port Moresby	462,840	11,781,559	25.5	2,560	0.576	Papua New Guinean kina (PGK; K)	English, Tok Pisin, and Hiri Motu	Charles III	James Marape	Observer	1994

=== ASEAN Plus Three Nation States ===
The present members of ASEAN together with:

Country	Capital	Area (km^{2})	Population	Density (/km^{2})	GDP per cap. (PPP)	HDI	Currency	Official languages	Leaders		Joined the ASEAN Regional Forum
Country	Capital	Area (km^{2})	Population	Density (/km^{2})	GDP per cap. (PPP)	HDI	Currency	Official languages	Head of state	Head of government	Joined the ASEAN Regional Forum
China	Beijing	9,640,011	1,371,790,000	139.6	12,880	0.719	Chinese yuan (CNY; ¥)	Standard Chinese	Xi Jinping (Note: Xi Jinping is China's nominal state representative, serving as Chinese president. Xi is also the general secretary of the Chinese Communist Party, the most powerful position in China, serving as the paramount leader of China.)	Li Qiang	1994
Japan	Tokyo	377,873	126,865,000	337.6	37,390	0.890	Japanese yen (JPY; ¥)	Japanese (de facto)	Naruhito	Sanae Takaichi	1994
South Korea	Seoul	100,140	51,448,183	493	35,277	0.891	South Korean won (KRW; ₩)	Korean	Lee Jae-myung		1994

=== East Asia Summit ===
The present members of ASEAN Plus Three together with:

Country	Capital	Area (km^{2})	Population	Density (/km^{2})	GDP per cap. (PPP)	HDI	Currency	Official languages	Leaders		Joined the ASEAN Regional Forum
Country	Capital	Area (km^{2})	Population	Density (/km^{2})	GDP per cap. (PPP)	HDI	Currency	Official languages	Head of state	Head of government	Joined the ASEAN Regional Forum
Australia	Canberra	7,686,850	27,536,874	3.7	64,547	0.958	Australian dollar (AUD; A$)	English (de facto)	Charles III	Anthony Albanese	1994
India	New Delhi	3,287,240	1,366,417,750	364.4	5,855	0.586	Indian rupee (INR; ₹)	Hindi in Devanagari script and English	Droupadi Murmu	Narendra Modi	1996
New Zealand	Wellington	268,680	4,612,280	16.1	35,152	0.910	New Zealand dollar (NZD; NZ$)	English, Māori, and NZ Sign Language	Charles III	Christopher Luxon	1994
Russia	Moscow	17,075,400	146,567,880	8.3	24,805	0.778	Russian ruble (RUB; ₽)	Russian	Vladimir Putin	Mikhail Mishustin	1994
United States	Washington, D.C.	9,629,091	321,719,000	32	54,597	0.914	United States dollar (USD; $)	English (de facto)	Donald Trump		1994

=== ASEAN Regional Forum ===
The ASEAN Regional Forum is an informal multilateral dialogue of 27 members that seeks to address security issues in the Asia-Pacific region.

The list includes the members of the East Asia Summit plus:

Country	Capital	Area (km^{2})	Population	Density (/km^{2})	GDP per cap. (PPP)	HDI	Currency	Official languages	Leaders		Joined the ASEAN Regional Forum
Country	Capital	Area (km^{2})	Population	Density (/km^{2})	GDP per cap. (PPP)	HDI	Currency	Official languages	Head of state	Head of government	Joined the ASEAN Regional Forum
Bangladesh	Dhaka	148,460	159,143,012	1,099.3	6,636	0.632	Bangladeshi taka (BDT; ৳)	Bengali	Mohammed Shahabuddin	Tarique Rahman	2006
Canada	Ottawa	9,984,670	41,651,653	4.2	53,558	0.939	Canadian dollar (CAD; C$)	English and French	Charles III	Mark Carney	1994
Mongolia	Ulaanbaatar	1,564,115	3,032,606	1.75	11,882	0.698	Mongolian tögrög (MNT; ₮)	Mongolian	Ukhnaagiin Khürelsükh	Nyam-Osoryn Uchral	1999
North Korea	Pyongyang	120,540	25,155,000	198.3	1,800 est.	0.540 (2012 UNDP)	North Korean won (KPW; ₩)	Korean	Kim Jong-un	Pak Thae-song	2000
Pakistan	Islamabad	796,095	191,198,263	214.3	4,736	0.537	Pakistani rupee (PKR; ₨)	Urdu and English	Asif Ali Zardari	Shehbaz Sharif	2004
Sri Lanka	Sri Jayawardenepura Kotte (Administrative), Colombo (Commercial)	65,610	20,771,00	323	10,372	0.750	Sri Lankan rupee (LKR; රු)	Sinhalese and Tamil	Anura Kumara Dissanayake	Harini Amarasuriya	2007
European Union	Brussels (de facto)	4,233,262	447,706,209	106	37,607	0.876 (UNDP cal.)	Euro (EUR; €) and 7 others	Various	António Costa	Ursula von der Leyen	1994
