= History of ASEAN =

The Association of Southeast Asian Nations (ASEAN) was established in 1967 during a period of Cold War tensions in Southeast Asia. Formed by five non-communist countries, Indonesia, Malaysia, the Philippines, Singapore, and Thailand, its primary goals were to promote regional solidarity, political stability, and economic development in a volatile geopolitical environment. Over the following decades, ASEAN expanded to include eleven member states and transformed from a loose alliance into a more institutionalized regional organization. It became a key actor in conflict mediation, economic integration, and multilateral diplomacy, fostering dialogue among major powers. By 2008, ASEAN had solidified its position as a central platform for regional cooperation, structured around political-security, economic, and socio-cultural pillars, and was formally recognized through the adoption of a charter that granted the organization legal personality.

== Development of Southeast Asia as a region ==
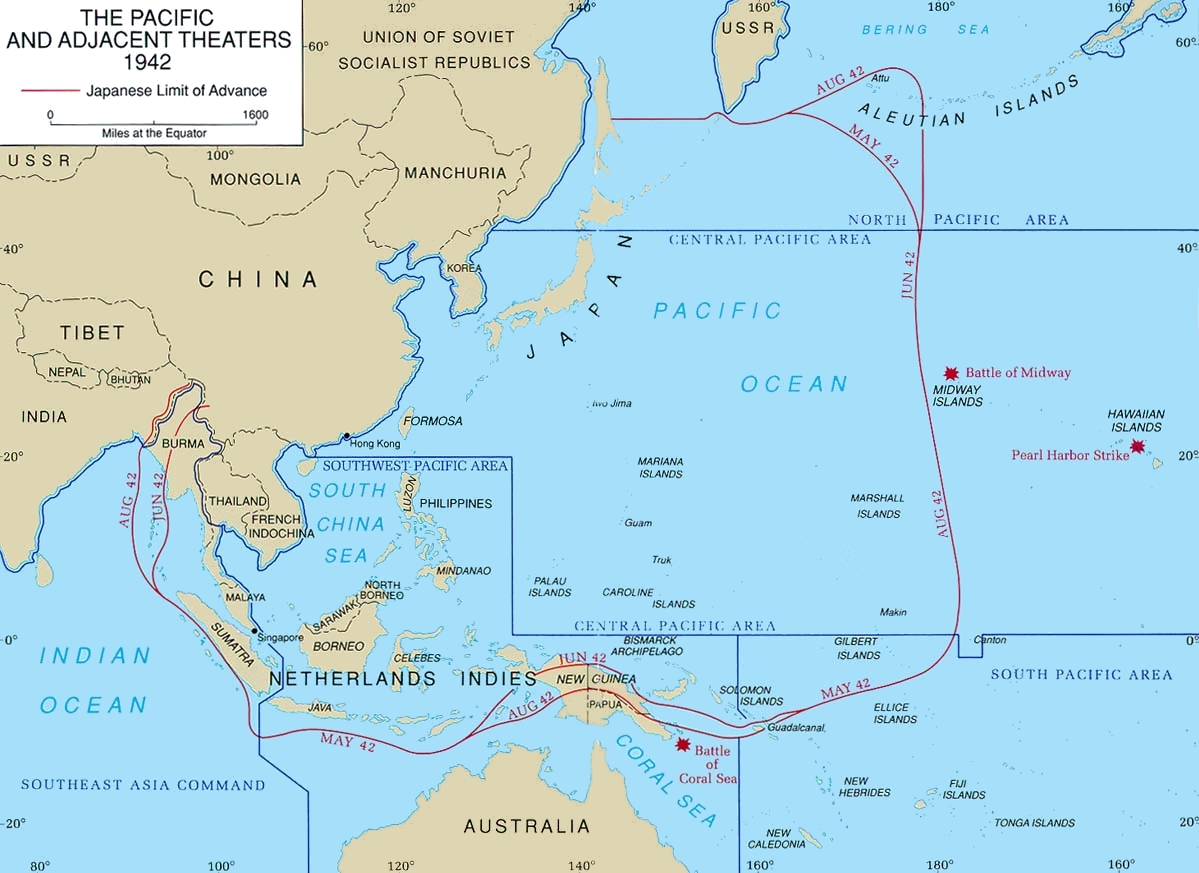
Map of the various command areas in the Pacific War of 1942/43. The South East Asia Command in the west.

During the formation of ASEAN, the definition of what constituted Southeast Asia was not yet firmly established. The phrase "Southeast Asia" had gained prominence during the Second World War, particularly through the creation of the Allied South East Asia Command (SEAC), which helped popularise the term. But SEAC's territorial scope was inconsistent, notably excluding the Philippines and large parts of Indonesia, while including Ceylon (now Sri Lanka).

By the late 1970s a broadly accepted understanding of the geographic scope of Southeast Asia and the areas it encompassed had been established. Though, during ASEAN's early years, it was ASEAN itself that determined which states qualified as part of Southeast Asia for the purpose of membership, effectively allowing the organisation to shape the region's political boundaries based on shared interests and strategic priorities rather than fixed geographic definitions.

== Ideas of Southeast Asian unity before 1967 ==
=== Tunku Abdul Rahman's role ===
In the late 1950s Southeast Asian leaders began exploring a region-led framework for cooperation amid the Cold War and the newly won independence of many states. Earlier attempts at regionalism, such as the 1947 South East Asia League by Thailand, the 1950 Baguio Conference initiated by the Philippines, and the Southeast Asia Treaty Organization (SEATO, 1954), had either been limited or dominated by external powers. By 1959, leaders of Malaya (independent in 1957) and the Philippines saw the need for a purely Southeast Asian alliance. In January 1959, during Malayan Prime Minister Tunku Abdul Rahman's visit to Manila, Philippine President Carlos P. Garcia and he, together with Philippine Foreign Minister Felixberto M. Serrano, issued a joint communiqué proposing an "association of Southeast Asia" for economic and cultural cooperation. This was the first time the idea of a regional alliance led by Southeast Asian nations was formally put forward. The proposal reflected shared postcolonial interests: both Malaya and the Philippines were staunchly anti-communist (each had fought communist insurgencies at home) and sought a united front to preserve regional stability without overt reliance on Western military pacts. At the same time, they emphasised an Asian-led initiative, independent of the former colonial powers, to foster cooperation in the spirit of the 1955 Bandung Conference's principles of Afro-Asian solidarity.

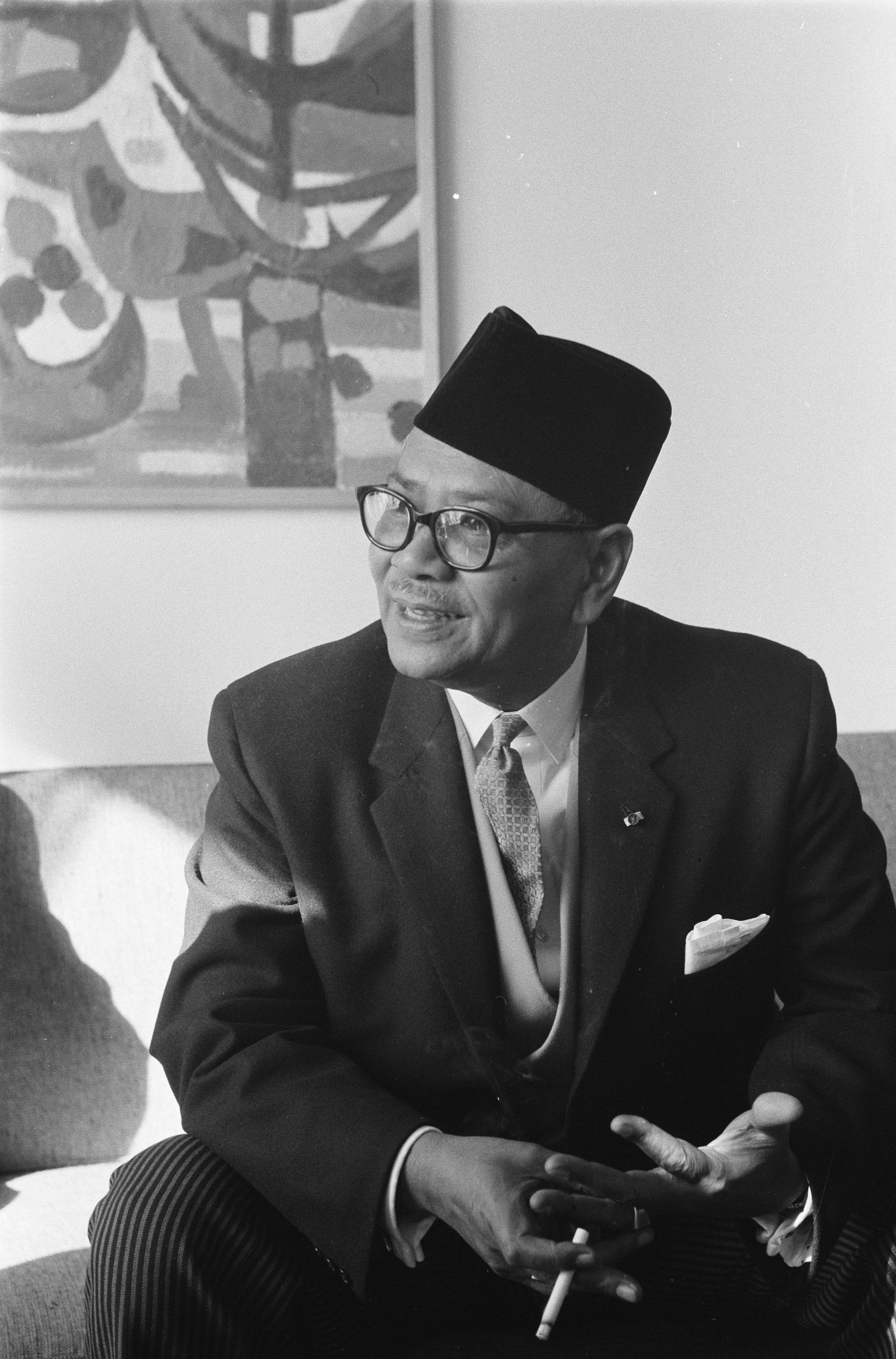
Tunku Abdul Rahman, the first prime minister of Malaysia, played a significant role in promoting regionalism in Southeast Asia.

The Malayan-Philippine proposal for an Association of Southeast Asia (ASA) was thus met with cautious reactions. Serrano initially felt it would be "presumptuous" for only a few countries to form a regional body; he preferred including at least a fourth nation. This led to overtures to other Southeast Asian states in 1959–1960. Tunku Rahman and Garcia reached out to leaders in Burma, Indonesia, Thailand, Cambodia, Laos, and South Vietnam, inviting them to join a broad regional grouping. A working committee outlined that the proposed association would prioritise cooperation in economic, social, technical, educational, and cultural fields, while remaining strictly non-political and neutral in ideology (explicitly upholding the Bandung principles). Despite the inclusive invitations, many regional governments demurred. Burma's leaders agreed in principle but ultimately declined, citing a need to focus on domestic problems and a desire to maintain strict neutrality. Cambodia's Prince Norodom Sihanouk likewise refused to participate, wary that a joint regional organisation might divide the world into Cold War blocs and compromise Cambodia's non-aligned stance. Indonesia was openly skeptical from the start. President Sukarno felt a new alliance was unnecessary given the existing Bandung Pact; he argued that ASA's proposed goals were already covered by the 1955 Asian-African Conference solidarity, and he saw ASA as potentially "unrealistic and useless." Privately, Sukarno also perceived the move as a challenge to his leadership in regional politics. He resented that the initiative had come from Kuala Lumpur and Manila, suspecting it might erode his prominence as a champion of Asian nationalism. Indonesian officials feared ASA would "degenerate into a simple anti-Communist club" aligned with Western interests, given that Malaya and the Philippines both had defence ties with the UK and US. These factors meant Indonesia (as well as other neutral states) pointedly stayed away, leaving the proponents to proceed largely on their own.

By 1960 it became clear that only Thailand was willing to join Malaya and the Philippines in the venture. Thailand's prime minister Sarit Thanarat and foreign minister Thanat Khoman were motivated to participate partly because of Thailand's frustration with SEATO's ineffectiveness (especially during the 1960–61 Laos crisis). Thailand faced growing communist subversion in neighboring Indochina and saw a non-military regional pact as a useful "balance" to its SEATO commitments. Thus, Thailand quietly entered discussions in late 1959. In April 1960 Rahman sent a special envoy to Manila to work out concrete steps with Philippine officials. In February 1961, President Garcia paid a state visit to Malaya; during this visit the Philippine and Malayan leaders (with Thailand's Foreign Minister present) agreed on measures to increase trade and cultural links as a precursor to the new association. In a joint press conference in Kuala Lumpur, they announced that Malaya, the Philippines, and Thailand would formally establish a regional organization within the year. A series of preparatory meetings followed, and a draft charter was prepared.

=== Association of Southeast Asia ===
Signatories of the First Bangkok Declaration

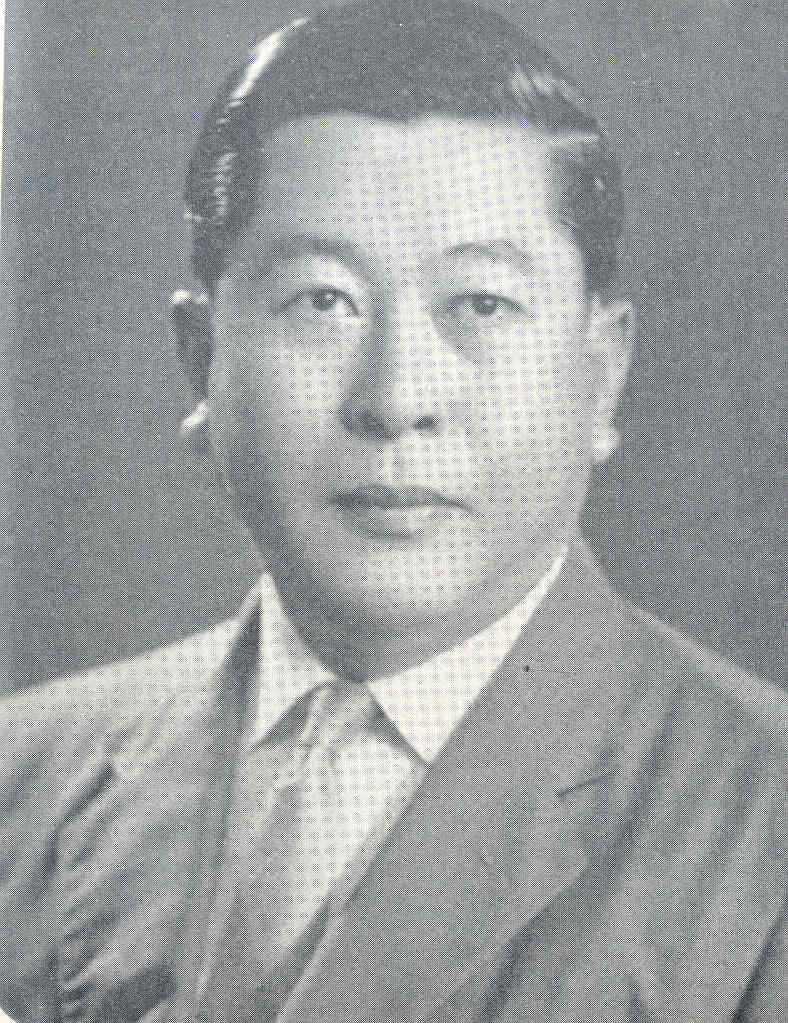
Thanat Khoman, Foreign Minister of Thailand

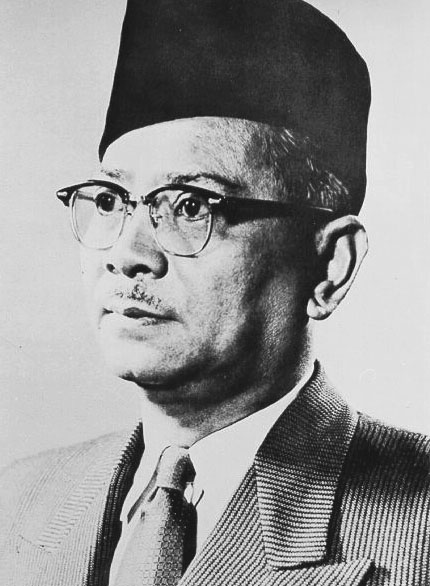
Tunku Abdul Rahman, Prime and Foreign Minister of Malaysia

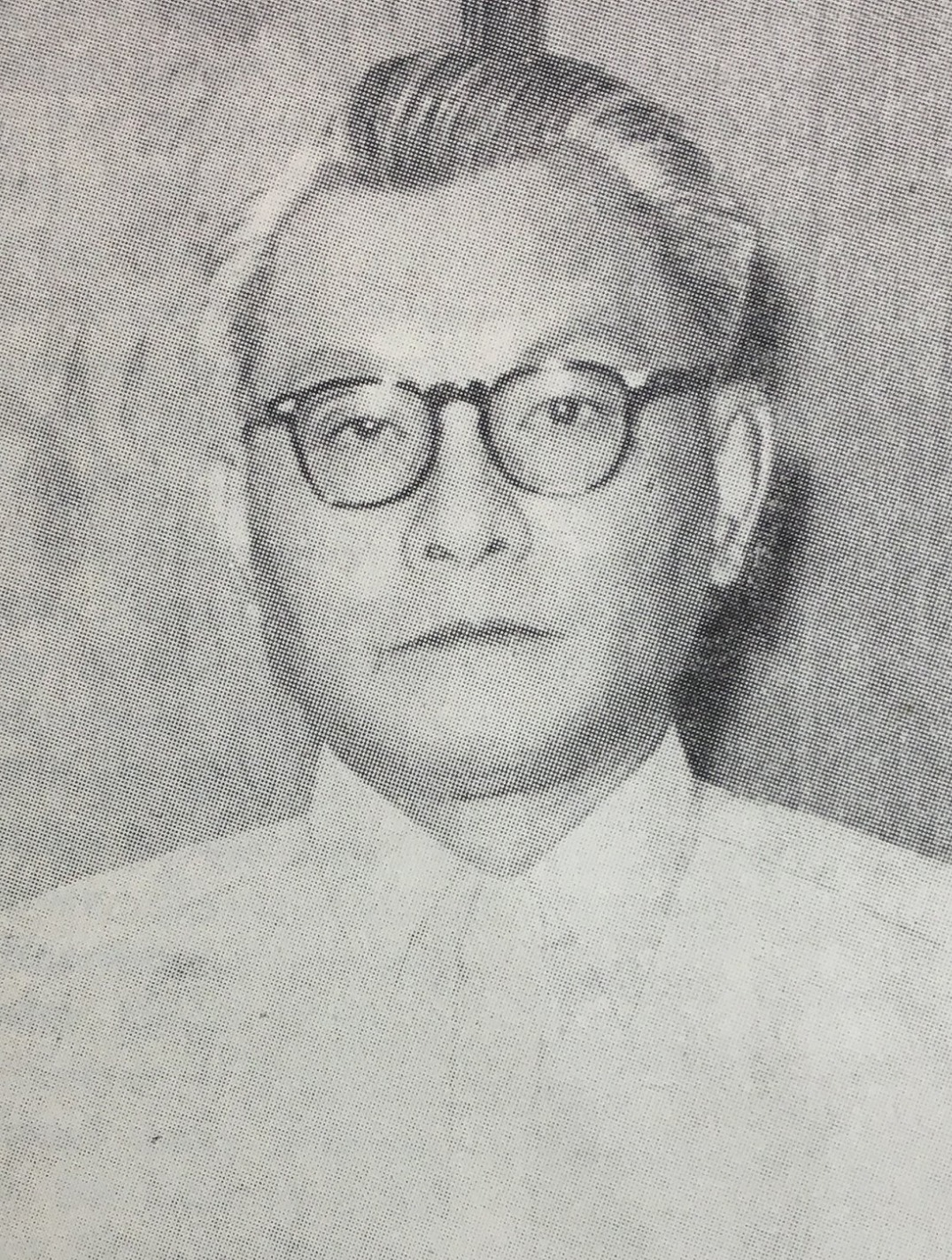
Felixberto M. Serrano, Secretary of Foreign Affairs of the Philippines

On 31 July 1961 the foreign ministers of Malaya, Thailand, and the Philippines met in Bangkok and signed what became known as the Bangkok Declaration, establishing the Association of Southeast Asia (ASA). This short document (essentially an executive agreement) declared the formation of "an association for economic and cultural cooperation among the countries of Southeast Asia to be known as ASA – Association of Southeast Asia". The founding signatories were Thailand's Thanat Khoman, Malaya's Tunku Rahman (who was both Prime Minister and Foreign Minister), and the Philippines' Felixberto Serrano. With that, ASA became the first regional organisation exclusively comprising Southeast Asian states. Notably, the name "ASA" was fitting – in Malay, Thai, and Tagalog asa means "hope," symbolising the aspirations pinned on the new alliance. The association was to promote regional cooperation in economic, social, cultural, scientific, and administrative fields, as well as to encourage mutual assistance for prosperity and security. In practice, however, all three founding members were strongly anti-communist and closely aligned with Western powers. This divergence between stated non-alignment and actual anti-communist solidarity made other regional players (especially Indonesia and Cambodia) skeptical of ASA's true intent. Some observers at the time noted that ASA's economic-cultural focus was something of a façade – the hope among its members was that closer cooperation would eventually spill over into the political and security realm.

Structurally, ASA was a relatively loose organisation, lacking a formal constitution or secretariat. The Bangkok Declaration was brief and did not establish a centralised bureaucracy; instead, coordination was to be managed through regular meetings and national focal points. In 1962 the ASA foreign ministers held a special meeting in the Cameron Highlands (Malaya) where they agreed on a basic institutional framework. They set up three standing committees, Economic, Social and Cultural, and Finance, to plan and implement cooperative projects in those spheres. A small ASA Fund was created to finance joint activities, with Malaysia (Malaya) and Thailand each initially contributing M$1 million (the Philippines was expected to match this). It was also decided that annual meetings of ASA foreign ministers would be held, rotating among the three member states. Following the inaugural 1961 Bangkok meeting, a second ASA ministerial meeting took place in Kuala Lumpur in 1962, and a third was anticipated in Manila in 1963. Though ASA's membership was small, the three countries moved quickly to demonstrate tangible cooperation.

In the months following the Bangkok Declaration, several joint projects described as ASA's "first fruits" were launched. For example, in 1962 Malaya and Thailand linked their railway systems and inaugurated the "ASA Express" train service between Kuala Lumpur and Bangkok. The inaugural train ran in April 1962 amid much fanfare, carrying Thai officials to Malaya. Likewise, to improve regional communications, the members agreed to extend a microwave telecommunications network between Malaysia and Thailand and to include the Philippines in a high-frequency radio link – an early step toward better telephonic and broadcast connections across borders. Economic cooperation was pursued through plans for trade facilitation. The ASA foreign ministers approved the negotiation of trilateral agreements on trade and navigation, aiming to boost commerce among the three economies. They also agreed to promote Southeast Asian tourism jointly and even discussed the idea of an "ASA Airways" cooperative airline venture. In the social sphere, ASA initiated notable exchanges in healthcare and education. The trio also waived visa requirements and fees for each other's citizens (at least for officials and certain passport holders) to facilitate easier travel. Cultural and student exchange programs were set up, and efforts were made to recognize each other's university degrees to encourage educational cooperation. Linguistic and educational gaps impeded some exchanges (for instance, English was commonly used in Malaya and the Philippines, but much less so in Thailand, complicating academic cooperation). All three economies were agrarian and competitive more than complementary, so immediate economic gains from ASA were limited. Moreover, without Indonesia or Burma, the region's largest markets and resources were outside ASA's framework, meaning ASA could not tackle issues like the global rubber market or regional industrialization.

=== Decline ===
ASA's momentum proved difficult to sustain as political tensions in the region escalated in the early 1960s. Ironically one of the first major strains came from within ASA's own ranks – a bilateral dispute between the Philippines and Malaya over North Borneo (Sabah). In May 1961 (just as ASA was taking shape), Tunku Rahman announced a grand plan to federate Malaya with the British territories of Singapore, North Borneo, Sarawak, and Brunei into a new nation to be called Malaysia. Initially, the Philippine government under President Garcia had not objected. But after Diosdado Macapagal assumed the Philippine presidency in late 1961, Manila's stance changed. Macapagal's administration revived a dormant Philippine claim to North Borneo, asserting historical sovereignty over Sabah. On 22 June 1962, the Philippines formally submitted this territorial claim, sparking a serious rift with Kuala Lumpur. Tunku Rahman viewed the claim as an affront to Malaya's territorial aspirations, and the issue quickly poisoned relations between the two ASA members. By the end of 1962, the Sabah dispute had paralysed ASA's activities. Joint projects were put on hold and trust between Malaya and the Philippines eroded. Tunku pointedly boycotted an ASA ministerial meeting scheduled in Manila for December 1962, making it impossible for the alliance to function. Filipino leaders, for their part, felt that Malaya's push for Malaysia (including Sabah) was subject to the outcome of the Philippine claim to North Borneo, and in late 1962 Manila began aligning its regional policy more closely with Indonesia, ASA's outsider.

At the same time Sukarno's Indonesia vehemently opposed the creation of the Federation of Malaysia, which it denounced as a neo-colonial scheme. In early 1963, Indonesia launched the Konfrontasi ("Confrontation") campaign, involving economic boycotts and armed incursions, to sabotage Malaysia's formation. Macapagal, despite ASA, felt compelled to cooperate with Indonesia against Malaysia. He saw common cause in preventing what he portrayed as British-imposed federation. Throughout 1963, the Philippines and Indonesia coordinated diplomatically in hopes of delaying or conditioning the birth of Malaysia. Thus the dispute and start of the Konfrontasi had led to the destruction of ASA.

=== Maphilindo ===
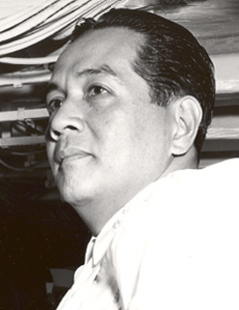
Diosdado Macapagal

In a final attempt to preserve regional cooperation amidst escalating tensions, Filipino president, Diosdado Macapagal, convened a summit in Manila during July–August 1963, bringing together Tunku Rahman and Sukarno. The summit produced the Manila Accord on 5 August 1963 and led to the formation of Maphilindo, a short-lived consultative grouping comprising Malaya, the Philippines, and Indonesia. Conceived as an "Association of Malay Peoples" or a loose confederation, Maphilindo aimed to resolve trilateral tensions through intra-regional dialogue and create unity among ethnically related nations, while minimizing external involvement. Despite its aspirational framework, Maphilindo's momentum was quickly undermined. When the Federation of Malaysia was officially established on 16 September 1963, both Indonesia and the Philippines severed diplomatic relations with Malaysia and withheld recognition of the new federation. Indonesia escalated its Konfrontasi campaign with military incursions into Borneo, peninsular Malaysia, and Singapore. The Philippines, while not directly involved militarily, aligned rhetorically with Indonesia. Consequently, Maphilindo, never institutionalized beyond the initial summit, disintegrated shortly after its creation, having failed to prevent the deepening regional conflict.

== ASA to ASEAN ==
By 1965–1966 the situation began to shift. Sukarno was ousted from power in Indonesia and General Suharto's new regime moved to end Konfrontasi. In August 1966, Indonesia and Malaysia signed a peace agreement, formally concluding Konfrontasi. The Philippines, now under President Ferdinand Marcos (who succeeded Macapagal in 1965), also normalised relations with Malaysia around the same time (Marcos quietly shelved the Sabah issue to mend fences). These developments eliminated the principal obstacles to regional cooperation, leading to a revival of the idea of Southeast Asian solidarity. However, for the former member states, it became evident that the Association of Southeast Asia (ASA) could no longer serve as a viable framework for such collaboration. Although ASA was never formally dissolved through a treaty, by 1966 it had become largely inactive. Nevertheless, its legacy proved instructive. The failure of both ASA and Malphilindo demonstrated to regional leaders the need for a new model, one that would incorporate all major Southeast Asian countries and establish stronger norms to mitigate the risk of internal disputes undermining the organisation. These insights directly influenced the formation of the Association of Southeast Asian Nations (ASEAN) in 1967.

== Initial years (1967–1978) ==
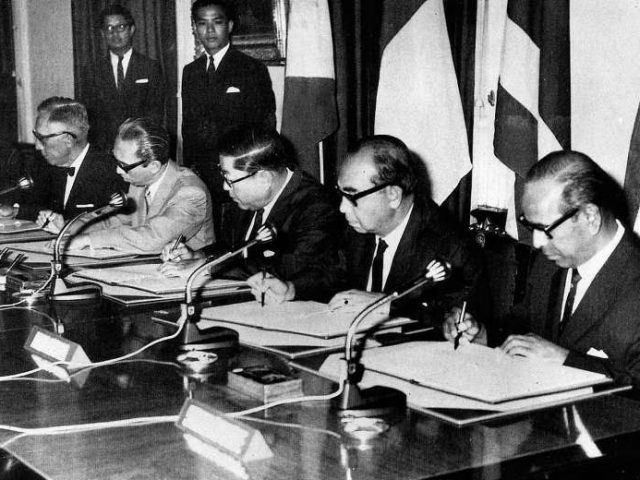
Signing of the ASEAN Declaration by five foreign ministers in Bangkok on 8 August 1967

ASEAN was created on 8 August 1967, when the foreign ministers of five countries, Indonesia, Malaysia, the Philippines, Singapore, and Thailand, signed the ASEAN Declaration. According to the declaration, ASEAN aimed to accelerate economic, social, and cultural development in the region, as well as promote regional peace, to collaborate on matters of shared interest, and to promote Southeast Asian studies and maintain close cooperation with existing international organisations. It is contended whether to whom the idea of ASEAN came about. In Anwar's analysis under the ISEAS institute, she denoted that the idea had strongly originated from Indonesia under the original Southeast Asian Association for Regional Cooperation (SEAARC) proposal. However, most sources highlight the leading role of Khoman in drafting the initial proposals, indicating that Thailand played a central role in both the early conceptualization and negotiation of SEAARC. While Indonesia participated actively in the initiative, it consistently expressed a commitment to avoiding dominance or the imposition of a fixed framework. In this context, Khoman's role as an intermediary and facilitator was instrumental in creating dialogue and consensus among the prospective member states.

The proposed name of the "Southeast Asian Association for Regional Cooperation" was largely debated during the Bangkok meeting. After the earlier proposed name was considered too lengthy and awkward, particularly the name had been troubling from the Filipino delegation who repeatedly stumbled on its pronunciation. The decision was made to retain "Association of Southeast Asia" (ASA), reflecting both continuity with the former organisation and Tunku Rahman's earlier ambition for regional cooperation. An alternative title, "Association of Southeast Asian States" (ASAS), was also used informally by the Thai secretariat, chosen for its regional resonance and Malay-inspired phrasing. Ultimately, Indonesian Foreign Minister Adam Malik proposed modifying the name to "Association of Southeast Asian Nations" (ASEAN) to distinguish it more clearly from the previous ASA framework. In a conversation with British Ambassador John Addis, Philippine Foreign Secretary, Narciso Ramos, stated that the objective was to establish a new association, described as a merger of ASA and Maphilindo, that would incorporate the most effective elements of both initiatives under a different name.

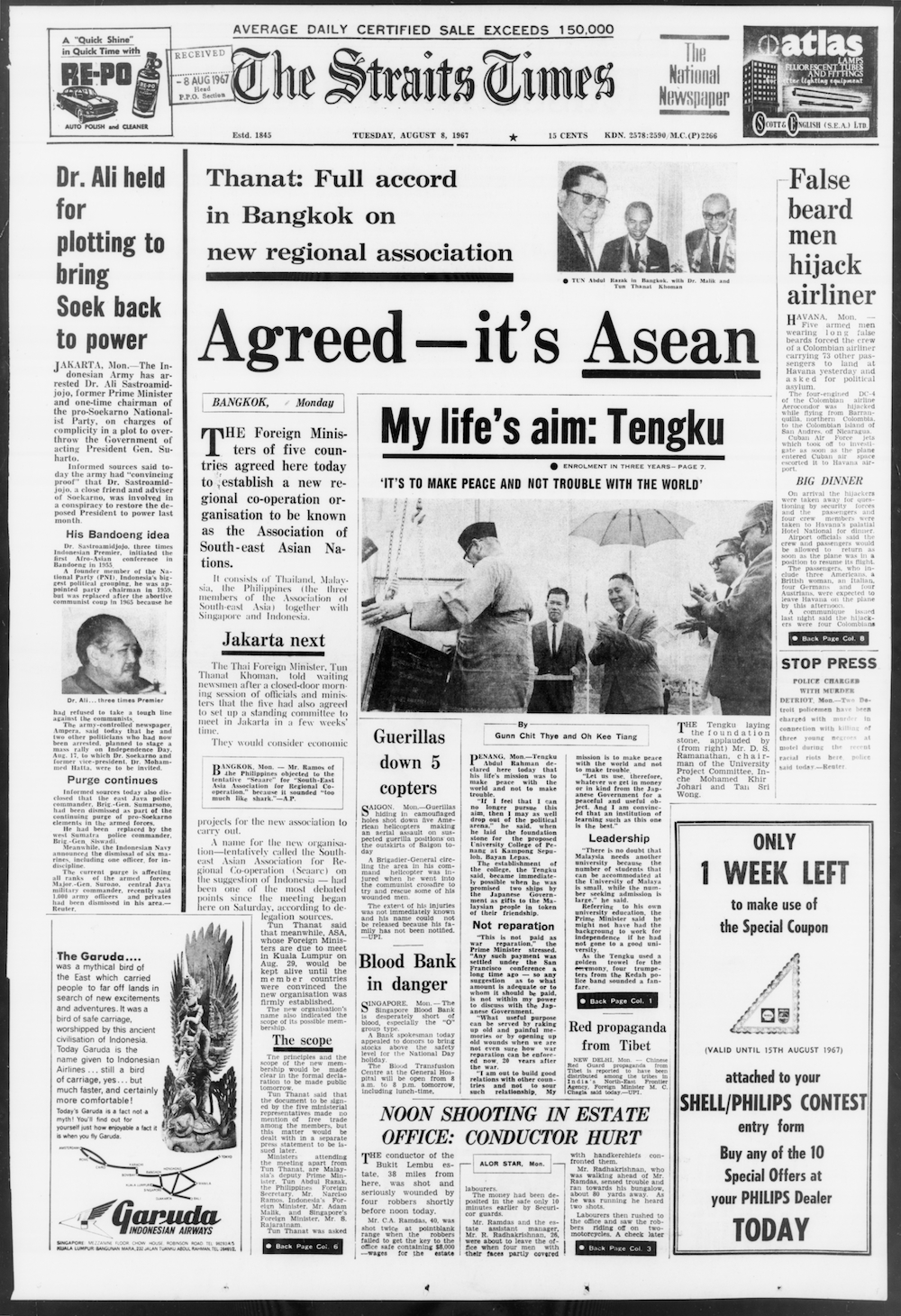
"Agreed — It's Asean." The headline on page 1 of The Straits Times newspaper on 8 August 1967.

At the time, however, ASEAN's founding members did not envisage the creation of any form of regionalism. The creation of ASEAN was initially was motivated by the desire to contain communism, which had taken a foothold in mainland Asia after World War II, with the formation of communist governments in North Korea, China, and Vietnam, accompanied by the so-called communist "emergency" in British Malaya, and unrest in the recently decolonized Philippines. The five founding members form ASEAN in the context of the Vietnam War and regional communist insurgencies, seeking to strengthen mutual cooperation and present a united front against communist expansion (though the declaration itself does not explicitly mention this threat). According to S. Rajaratnam, Singapore's Foreign Minister at the time of ASEAN's founding, stated that "the motivation behind ASEAN was not belief in the merits of regionalism as such, but it was more a response ... to the Western abandonment of its role as a shield against communism."

These events also encouraged the earlier formation of the South East Asia Treaty Organization (SEATO), led by the United States, United Kingdom, and Australia, with several Southeast Asian partners in 1954 as an extension of "containment" policy, seeking to create an Eastern version of NATO. However, the local member states of ASEAN group achieved greater cohesion in the mid-1970s following a change in the balance of power after the Fall of Saigon and the end of the Vietnam War in April 1975 and the decline of SEATO.

In ASEAN's early years, member states prioritised the creation of cooperative mechanisms and the building of trust, following a regional history marked by inter-state tensions. The launch of the ASEAN Ministerial Meeting (AMM), an annual gathering of foreign ministers, provided a critical platform for dialogue and diplomacy. The second AMM meet was held in Jakarta, Indonesia (6–7 August 1968) and the third AMM meet in the Cameron Highlands, Malaysia (16–17 December 1969). Although few joint projects were initiated during this formative period, these regular consultations played a vital role in reducing bilateral frictions. Notably, countries like Indonesia, Malaysia, and the Philippines were able to set aside contentious issues in favour of promoting cohesion between the states. By the third AMM meet, member states laid the initial institutional foundations for ASEAN by establishing a formal financial mechanism through the Agreement for the establishment of a fund for ASEAN.

=== Neutralising Southeast Asia ===
In the late 1960s and early 1970s, Southeast Asia was a focal point of Cold War tensions, with significant involvement from major powers like the United States, the Soviet Union, and China. The Vietnam War, the spread of communism, and geopolitical rivalries heightened regional instability. Amid these challenges, ASEAN sought to assert its autonomy and prevent Southeast Asia from becoming a battleground for external powers. Malaysia proposed the concept of neutralising the whole region to safeguard its sovereignty and promote regional stability. The proposal emerged in the context of significant geopolitical shifts, including the British military withdrawal from Malaysia and Singapore, the U.S. enunciation of the Nixon Doctrine, and the Soviet Union's proposal for a collective security arrangement in Southeast Asia under Leonid Brezhnev in June 1969.

The idea was initially articulated by Tun Ismail Abdul Rahman, Malaysia's then Minister of Home Affairs, during a 1968 defence debate in the Dewan Rakyat. He proposed a policy of neutralisation for Southeast Asia as a way to reduce defence expenditures and redirect funds toward social development. He also advocated for non-aggression treaties, mutual non-interference in domestic affairs, and respect for each nation's chosen form of government. Although Prime Minister Tunku Rahman was initially hesitant to endorse the proposal, his deputy, Tun Abdul Razak, viewed the concept as "wise, imaginative, and far-sighted." Following the 1969 Kuala Lumpur riots, Razak succeeded the Tunku Rahman as Prime Minister and took leadership in advancing the Zone of Peace, Freedom and Neutrality (ZOPFAN) vision. In a July 1971 speech, Prime Minister Razak stated that great power involvement had long destabilised Southeast Asia, and peace could only be achieved through neutralisation. He argued that regional states must actively create the conditions necessary for such neutralisation, demonstrating that a neutral Southeast Asia could also align with the legitimate strategic interests of the major powers.

Consequently the five ASEAN nations proclaimed the ZOPFAN under compromise. In the Kuala Lumpur Declaration of 27 November 1971, the five ASEAN foreign ministers declared Southeast Asia as a region free from any form of interference by outside powers. ZOPFAN reflects ASEAN's desire to insulate the region from Cold War conflicts and to prevent domination by any external power. Although largely aspirational, this declaration signals ASEAN's intent to pursue a neutral foreign policy stance collectively, even as the Vietnam War raged on the Indochinese peninsula. Despite its aspirational goals, the implementation of ZOPFAN faced challenges due to divergent threat perceptions among member states and their varying degrees of reliance on external powers for security and economic support; for instance, while Indonesia advocated for regional self-reliance, countries like Singapore sought external security assurances due to their strategic vulnerabilities. Additionally, the geopolitical complexities of the time, including the Vietnam War and the influence of major powers like the United States, the Soviet Union, and China, made the realisation of a truly neutral zone difficult. Consequently, ZOPFAN functioned more as a political declaration symbolising regional unity and the aspiration for autonomy rather than an actionable policy. Over time, the prominence of the ZOPFAN concept diminished, particularly around the turn of the millennium, as ASEAN adapted to new geopolitical realities and sought alternative frameworks to maintain regional autonomy and stability. ASEAN continued its trajectory of incremental cooperation, particularly in the economic and social sectors. Member states launched various joint initiatives, including efforts in food security and cultural exchanges, and explored preferential trade arrangements to enhance regional connectivity. A key institutional development was the establishment of the ASEAN Standing Committee in 1973, designed to coordinate activities between annual ministerial meetings and provide continuity in ASEAN's decision-making processes.

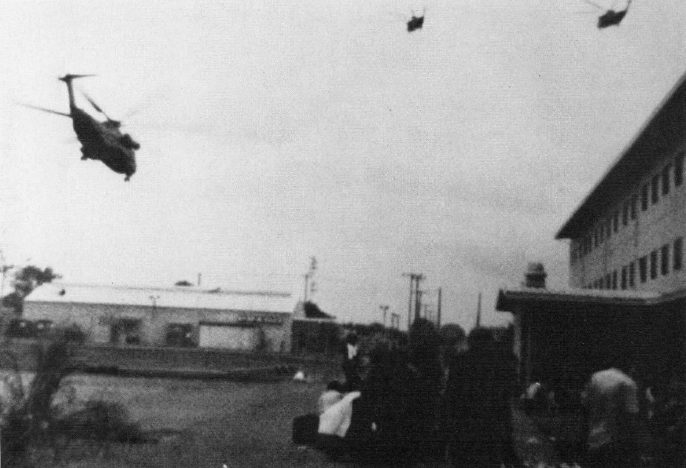
The fall of Saigon and U.S. abandonment from Indochina catalyzed rapid reforms and development of ASEAN.

The rapid and unexpected collapse of the regimes in the fall of Phnom Penh and Saigon in April 1975, and saw communist regimes come to power in Vietnam, Laos, and Cambodia, left the member states of ASEAN unprepared to the changing geopolitical landscape. In briefing U.S. President Gerald Ford and Secretary of State Henry Kissinger on the stance of Southeast Asian nations', Singaporean Prime Minister Lee Kuan Yew reccounts "one of astonishment and alarm at the rapidity with which the situation fell apart." Southeast Asian democracies began a political redoubt on the viability of the 'Domino Theory'. Malaysian Foreign Minister Tan Sri Ghazali Shafie openly dismissed 'Domino Theory', calling it "patently suspect in terms of both theory and empirical validity" and insisting that it held no relevance for Southeast Asian states.

As a grouping of anti-communist states, ASEAN did not initially admit these Indochinese countries, but it began to consider strategies for future engagement. With the shifting regional landscape following the collapse of regimes in Indochina, Malaysian Prime Minister Tun Abdul Razak offered a conciliatory stance, expressing his openness to the idea of incorporating Indochinese states into ASEAN.

In contrast Singapore's S. Rajaratnam urged ASEAN members to base their decisions on the assumption of a continued Western presence in Southeast Asia, reflecting a more cautious and pragmatic outlook. Meanwhile, Indonesia's Adam Malik adopted a non-aligned stance, advocating that ASEAN's adjustment should not be driven by fear. He emphasized that the organization's policy should focus on peaceful coexistence with the newly communist states of Indochina, signaling a more accommodating and diplomatic approach as per the Bandung Conference. The Thai Foreign Minister proposed the creation of "a forum of all Southeast Asian countries" aimed at creating dialogue and resolving tensions between the communist and non-communist states in the region. However, the momentum behind the proposal dissipated rapidly as regional tensions escalated. Skirmishes soon broke out along the Thai-Cambodian border and between Vietnam and Cambodia over contested islands in the Gulf of Thailand, undermining any immediate hopes for multilateral diplomacy and exposing deep-seated mistrust among neighbouring states. However, in the end, without mentioning ASEAN expansion, most agreed to enter friendly relations with Indochina as a way to realize the acceleration of the ZOPFAN road plan. Though, for ZOPFAN, taken under necessity rather than consensus, marking one of the rare instances in which ASEAN policy was formulated without the full support of all its member states.

Internally ASEAN's commitment to non-interference was tested by events such as the 1975 Indonesian invasion of East Timor. While the action was controversial internationally, ASEAN members tacitly accepted it, refraining from public criticism in line with the norm of non-interference. Though this act could also come from the organisation's attempt at avoiding open criticism of Indonesia, who used the invasion under the pretext of anti-communism and containment. For Vietnam, any acts of military cooperation among ASEAN countries were seen as provocation; going as far as dubbing ASEAN as the "new-SEATO" within its propaganda. As a way to unify ASEAN amidst growing uncertainties in the region, Indonesian Foreign Minister Adam Malik revived a proposal that had earlier been made by the Philippines: to convene a meeting of ASEAN heads of government. Recognising the potential of such a summit to solidify ASEAN's internal cohesion and collective identity, Malik began promoting the idea during regional consultations. His efforts coincided with a regional tour by Kukrit Pramoj, the newly appointed Prime Minister of Thailand, who successfully garnered the support of other ASEAN leaders for the proposal.

=== Beginning of ASEAN summits ===
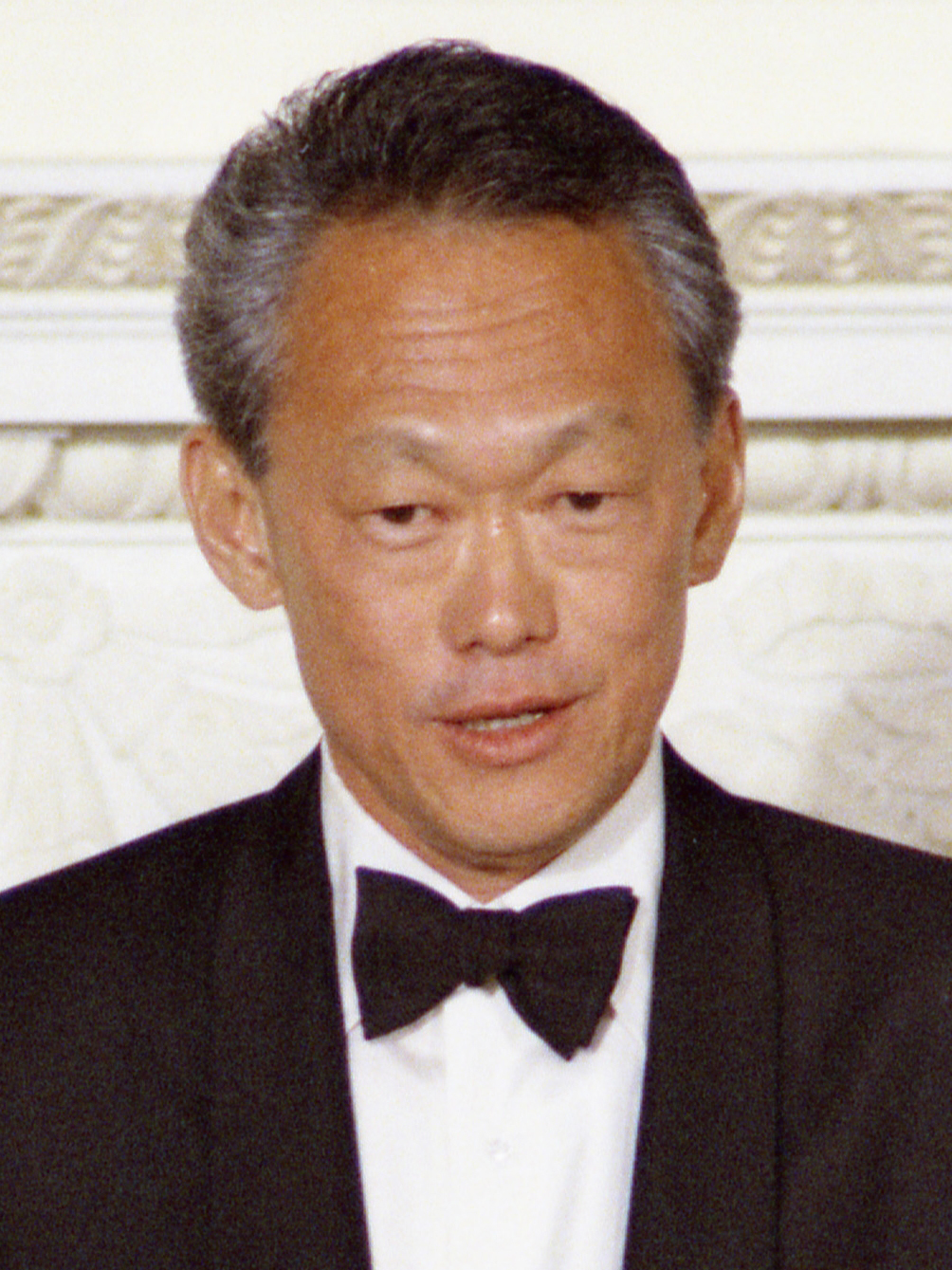

Up till yesterday, a favorite question posed by ASEAN-watchers was: 'Has ASEAN a future?' When our officials follow up on the agreements we have reached at this meeting, their question will now be: 'What kind of future will it be for ASEAN?'

— Lee Kuan Yew, at the closing of the Meeting of the Heads of Government, 24 February 1976, Denpasar, Bali, Indonesia.

The first ASEAN Summit was convened in Bali, Indonesia, on 23–24 February 1976. This landmark meeting of ASEAN heads of state/government resulted in major institutional and normative advances in ASEAN and Southeast Asian diplomacy. Convening at this summit were the leaders of the five founding members: President Suharto of Indonesia, Prime Minister Datuk Hussein Onn of Malaysia, President Ferdinand E. Marcos of the Philippines, Prime Minister Lee Kuan Yew of Singapore, and Prime Minister Kukrit Pramoj of Thailand. The summit was initiated as member states had expressed their readiness to "develop fruitful relations" and mutually beneficial co-operation with other countries of the region.

At this summit the leaders signed the Treaty of Amity and Cooperation in Southeast Asia (TAC), a peace treaty binding all members to fundamental principles of mutual respect for sovereignty, non-interference, peaceful settlement of disputes, and renunciation of threat or use of force. They also signed the Declaration of ASEAN Concord (Bali Concord I), outlining plans for intensified cooperation in politics, economics, and culture. Additionally, the ASEAN leaders agreed to establish a formal ASEAN Secretariat in Jakarta to coordinate the group's activities amidst the increasing importance of ASEAN. The 1976 summit thus provided the organisation with stronger institutional framework and a set of guiding principles that would govern inter-state relations in the region going forward. These principles collectively formed as the "ASEAN Way." Notably, the TAC's norms of amity and non-aggression were later opened for accession by countries outside the region, signalling ASEAN's hope that external powers will also respect these principles.

The second ASEAN Summit was held in Kuala Lumpur, Malaysia (4–5 August 1977), further solidifying high-level dialogue. One outcome was a push for greater economic cooperation to complement the political solidarity achieved in 1976. ASEAN leaders emphasised improving economic conditions and development at home by expanding relations with industrialised nations. Following the summit, ASEAN convened its first post-summit dialogues with key partners; meetings are held with Japan, Australia, New Zealand, and the United States, indicating ASEAN's growing diplomatic outreach. These interactions marked the start of ASEAN's formal dialogue-partner system, integrating external powers into ASEAN-led cooperation frameworks. That year, ASEAN also launched a Preferential Trading Arrangement (PTA) to begin reducing intra-regional tariffs on certain products, an initial step (albeit a limited one) towards economic integration.

== 1978–1995: Actor for peace ==
=== Crisis in Kampuchea ===
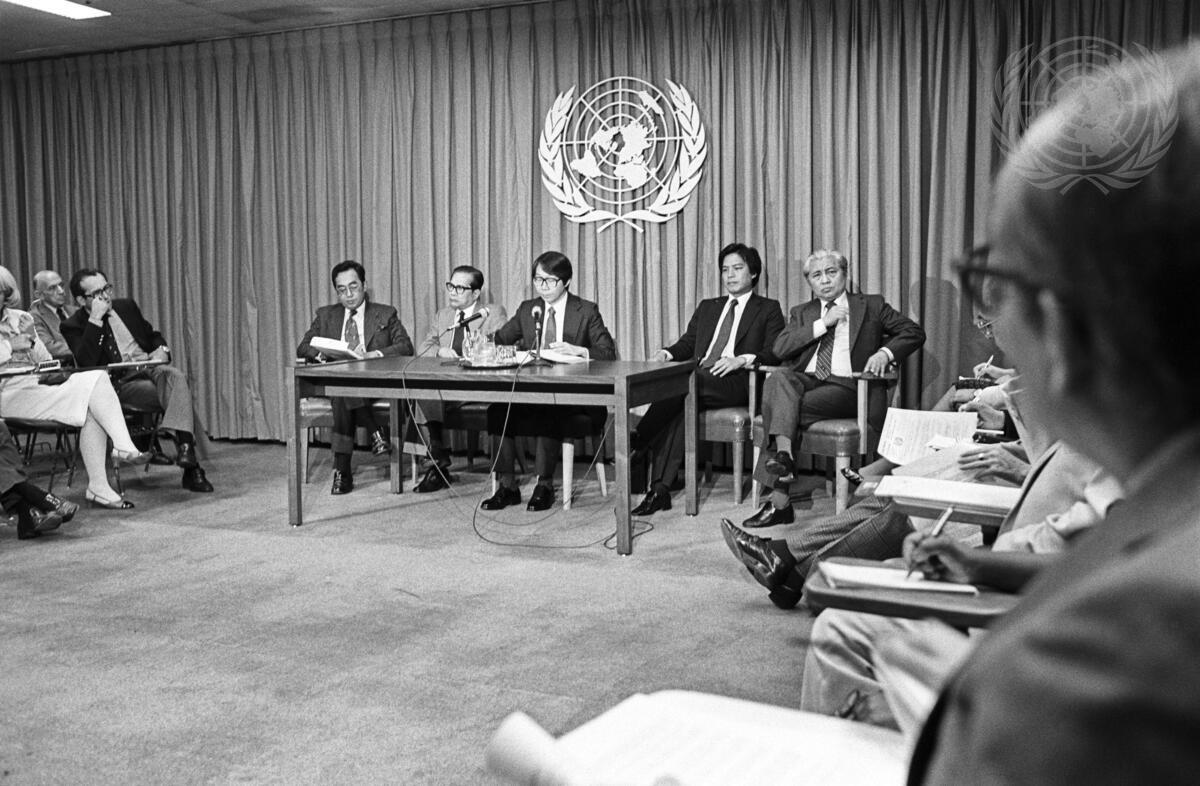
Singapore's Tommy Koh (middle) leads the ASEAN Coalition at a UN press conference after the Kampuchea conference, with envoys from Malaysia, the Philippines, Thailand, and Indonesia, 20 July 1981.

A major regional security crisis erupted when Vietnam invaded Cambodia (Kampuchea) in December 1978, toppling the Khmer Rouge regime. ASEAN, now firmly established as a diplomatic cohort, reacted in unison to this "Third Indochina War." According to Thanat Khoman, growing Vietnamese ambitions and developments within Indochina compelled ASEAN to shift its focus toward the Cambodian conflict. This realignment of priorities significantly altered the bloc's early agenda. As a result, economic cooperation, which had initially been a central objective, was almost entirely neglected and set aside. The urgency of regional security concerns, particularly the implications of Vietnam's involvement in Cambodia, pushed ASEAN to prioritize political solidarity and diplomacy over economic integration during this period. Singapore played a prominent role in advocating the Kampuchean issue at the United Nations, with Rajaratnam serving as a key spokesperson.

In 1979 ASEAN's foreign ministers coordinated a diplomatic campaign calling for the immediate withdrawal of foreign (Vietnamese) forces from Cambodia and the restoration of a neutral Cambodia. At the United Nations, ASEAN sponsored Resolution 34/22 in the UN General Assembly, which was adopted on 14 November 1979. It demanded Vietnam's withdrawal from Kampuchea. Backed by many countries (including China and the United States), ASEAN succeeded in denying international recognition to Vietnam's client regime in Phnom Penh and instead ensured that the ousted Khmer Rouge-led coalition retains Cambodia's UN seat. Through the 1980s, ASEAN annually mobilised UN support for a resolution on Cambodia and served as the diplomatic voice of the anti-Vietnamese Cambodian coalition, exemplifying ASEAN's growing role in regional conflict management.

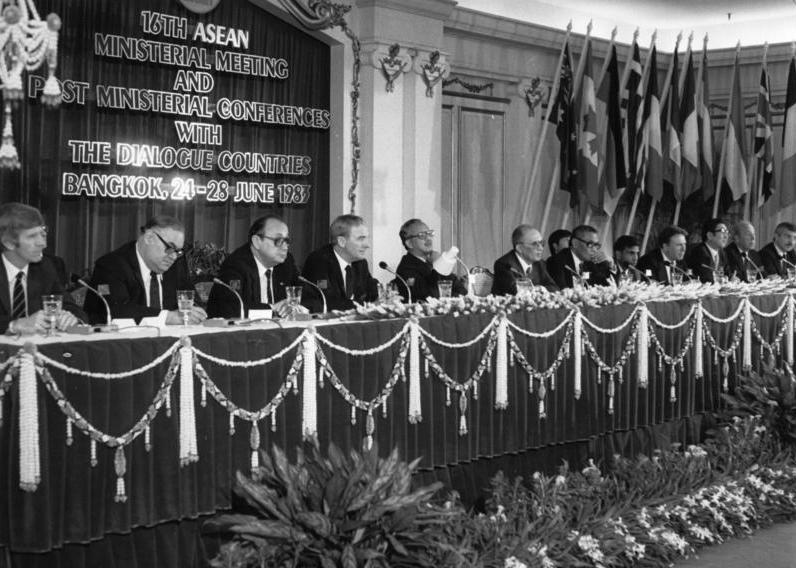
The16th ASEAN Ministerial Meeting, held in Bangkok on 24 June 1983, addressed the situation in Kampuchea (now Cambodia) amidst concerns on regional peace and stabilitty.

In 1980 ASEAN and the European Economic Community (EEC) signed a Cooperation Agreement, the first between ASEAN and a regional economic bloc. It covered trade, economic, and development cooperation. The United States, Japan, Australia, Canada, and New Zealand had earlier become ASEAN dialogue partners (formal relations established in the late 1970s), and regular ASEAN-Post Ministerial conferences begin to be held, in which ASEAN foreign ministers met their counterparts from these major powers. Meanwhile, ASEAN kept a hard line on Cambodia as it formed the "ASEAN Coalition" with Western and Chinese backing to diplomatically isolate Vietnam. ASEAN also engaged China, despite wariness of Chinese influence, due to being an ally in opposing Vietnam in Cambodia. The decade also hosted an emerging security cooperation between Vietnam and the Soviet Union, particularly that of the presence of Soviet naval activity within Southeast Asian waters, concerned many of ASEAN's states. Alarmed, Lee Kuan Yew requested that ASEAN nations conduct joint military drills. Thailand was against the plan. Likewise, Indonesia disagreed with the assessment that multilateral exercises would be provocative to the "other side" and that current bilateral links among ASEAN nations were enough to handle new security threats, rejecting any hints of a "security pact" within ASEAN.

Economic cooperation remains limited but gains some momentum with the 1981 ASEAN Industrial Cooperation scheme (to spur joint industrial projects among members). In the years following, ASEAN and its international partners, would focus and address the Indochinese refugee crisis, co-hosting an international conference and refugee centers to resolve the plight of refugees fleeing Vietnam, Laos, and Cambodia.

=== Brunei into the fold ===
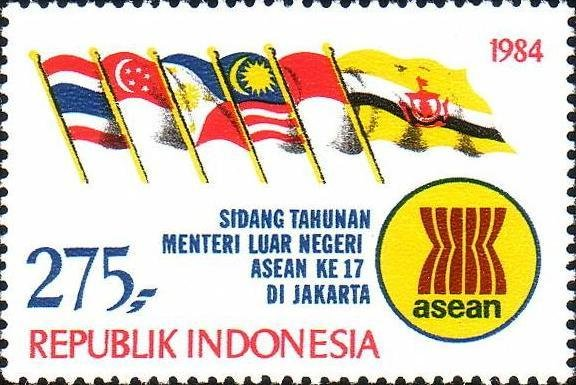
Stamp of Southeast Asian flags lined up for the admission of Brunei

Brunei joined ASEAN on 7 January 1984, becoming the sixth member of the Association. Brunei had gained full independence from the United Kingdom only a week earlier (1 January 1984) and quickly moved to align with its Southeast Asian neighbours. ASEAN's expansion to Brunei demonstrated the organisation's appeal to newly independent states in the region. With Brunei's entry, ASEAN comprised all the Southeast Asian countries except the socialist states of Indochina (Vietnam, Laos, Cambodia) and Myanmar.

Throughout the mid-1980s ASEAN continued its diplomatic efforts on the Cambodia conflict. It also collectively condemned the Soviet Union's military presence in Vietnam's Cam Ranh Bay and the general expansion of Soviet influence in Southeast Asia, consistent with ASEAN's anti-communist stance during late Cold War. Economically, member states in 1985 agreed to form an ASEAN Free Trade Area in principle, but concrete steps were delayed due to differing levels of development and concerns over competition. This hesitation persisted until the 1990s.

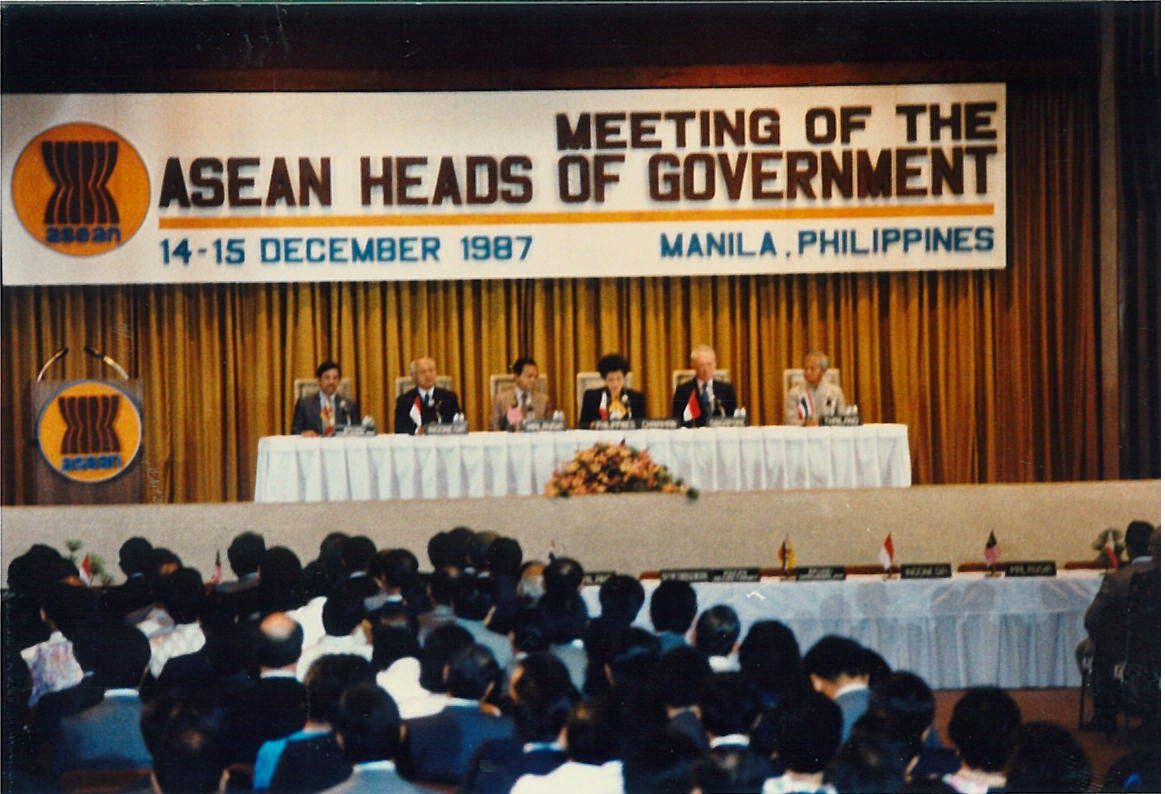
3rd ASEAN Summit, Manila 14‒15 December 1987

On 14–15 December 1987 the third ASEAN Summit was held in Manila. The summit, coming a decade after the last formal heads-of-state meeting, was convened to reinvigorate ASEAN. The leaders discussed speeding up economic cooperation and expressed a united stance on political-security issues, particularly Cambodia. It underscored the need for ASEAN to adapt to a changing regional environment as the Cold War neared its end. The summit also coincides with internal changes: the original generation of ASEAN leaders (such as Suharto, Mahathir Mohamad, Lee Kuan Yew) reinforced their commitment to ASEAN as part of their legacy. At this time, ASEAN began planning for the eventual settlement of the Cambodian conflict – Indonesia's Foreign Minister Ali Alatas initiated informal peace talks known as the Jakarta Informal Meetings (JIM) in 1988–1989, bringing together Vietnam and Cambodian factions in a neutral setting. These quiet ASEAN-led mediations laid groundwork for the comprehensive peace process that followed.

=== Finding ASEAN's role in Asia ===
The Cold War wound down, bringing significant shifts to Southeast Asia. In 1989, Vietnam announced its complete withdrawal of troops from Cambodia, a move ASEAN had long demanded. ASEAN actively participated in the international negotiations that followed: notably, ASEAN members co-chaired the Paris Peace Conference on Cambodia. A breakthrough was achieved with the signing of the Paris Peace Agreements in October 1991, ending the Cambodian conflict. ASEAN's diplomatic solidarity and engagement were critical in this outcome – ASEAN is credited with keeping the Cambodia issue in the world's attention and facilitating a solution. In 1990, ASEAN made another notable decision: it agreed to admit Vietnam, Laos, and Cambodia in principle as members in the future, shedding its Cold War reluctance.

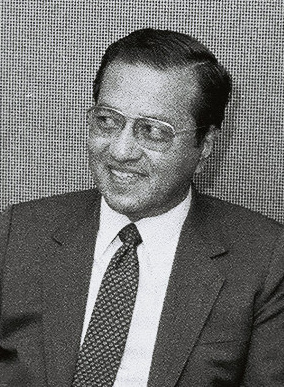
Mahathir Mohamad briefly proposed an East Asian economic bloc, comparable to that of the European Union.

In 1990 Malaysia's then Prime Minister and Pan-Asianist, Mahathir Mohamad, proposed an East Asia Economic Group (EAEG), a regional-economic bloc that would include ASEAN and its East Asian neighbors. Mahathir envisioned the EAEG as a platform for these countries to coordinate economic policies, foster closer trade relations, and collectively strengthen their economic standing in response to the formation of other regional economic blocs, such as the European Union and the North American Free Trade Agreement (NAFTA). In response to the challenges faced by the EAEG proposal, Mahathir rebranded the initiative as the East Asia Economic Caucus (EAEC), which aimed to be a consultative forum within the broader framework of the Asia-Pacific Economic Cooperation (APEC), focusing on the specific interests of East Asian nations. Despite this adjustment, the EAEC still faced resistance and did not materialize as an official entity.

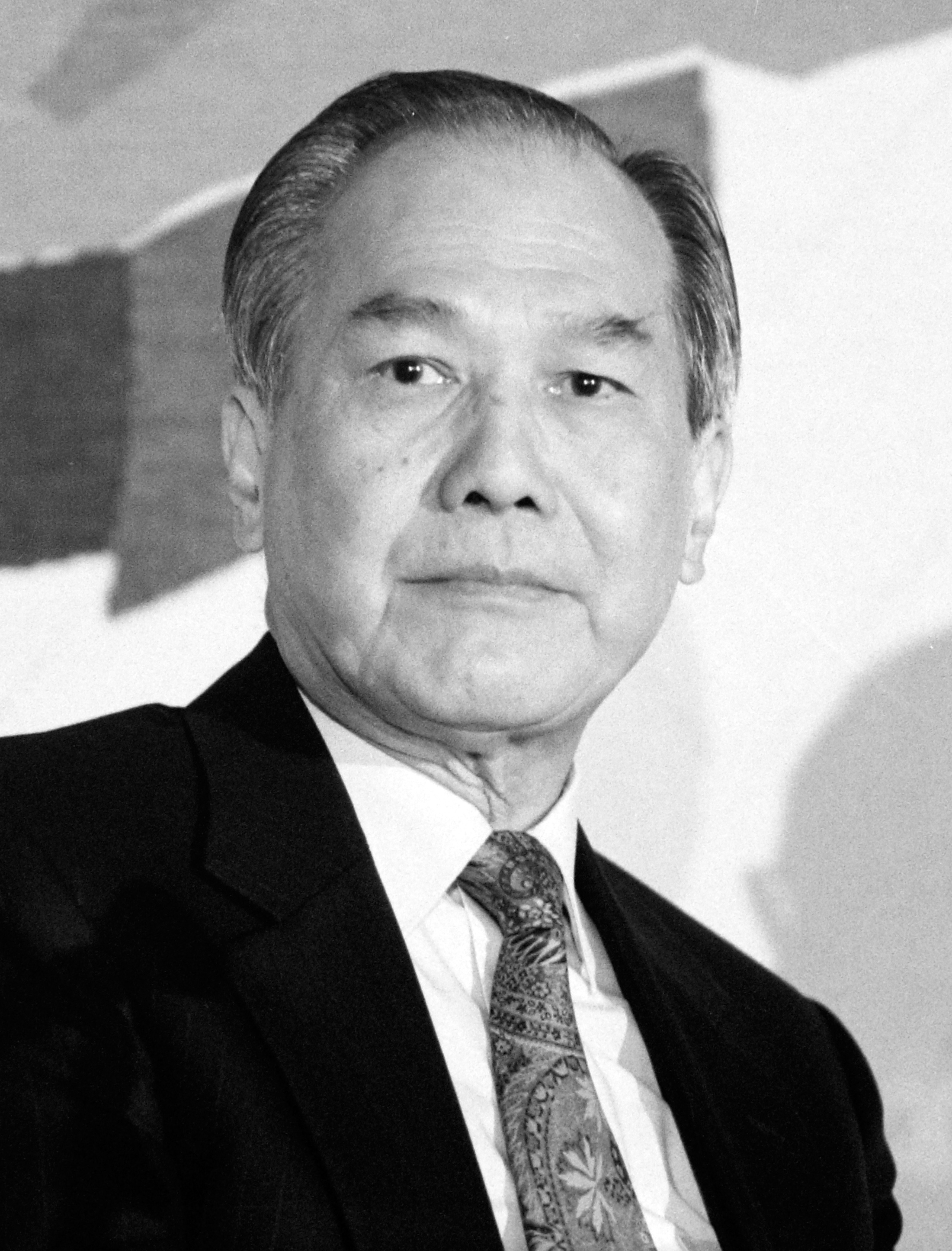
Thai Prime Minister Anand Panyarachun, who proposed the ASEAN Free Trade Area initiative

In July 1991 during the 24th ASEAN Ministerial Meeting in Kuala Lumpur, Thai Prime Minister Anand Panyarachun proposed the creation of a free trade area among ASEAN countries to Singapore's Prime Minister Goh Chok Tong. This initiative aimed to liberalize intra-ASEAN trade and strengthen the region's economic competitiveness. By September 1991, the proposal for a regional trade arrangement gained support from key ASEAN leaders, including Malaysian Prime Minister Mahathir Mohamad. Initially, Indonesian Minister of Industry Hartarto Sastrosoenarto expressed reservations about the proposal, favoring the use of a Common Effective Preferential Tariff (CEPT) scheme over any explicit reference to "free trade." However, continued advocacy from the Thai Prime Minister, combined with the absence of objections from other member states, led Hartarto to concede. The agreement on the name was finalized during the ASEAN Economic Ministers Meeting held in Kuala Lumpur on 7–8 October 1991.

Subsequently, during the fourth ASEAN Summit, held in Singapore on 27–29 January 1992, the leaders signed the Framework Agreement on Enhancing ASEAN Economic Cooperation, which led to the creation of the ASEAN Free Trade Area (AFTA). The AFTA agreement (signed 28 January 1992) committed the six members at the time to reduce tariffs on intra-ASEAN trade to 0–5% by 2008, using a Common Effective Preferential Tariff (CEPT) scheme. This move was driven by the desire to increase ASEAN's attractiveness as a production base and to compete for foreign direct investment by integrating their economies. The summit also agreed on measures to promote the freer flow of services and investment. In the political realm, ASEAN foreign ministers met in Manila in July 1992 and issued the ASEAN Declaration on the South China Sea – the first joint statement on the South China Sea disputes. In this declaration, ASEAN called for all claimants to exercise restraint and peacefully resolve territorial disputes, and it expressed ASEAN's wish to develop a code of conduct for the South China Sea.

In 1993 ASEAN began to institutionalize its post-Cold War regional role. Building on the previous year's initiatives, officials worked on implementing AFTA's tariff cuts (the CEPT scheme started in 1993, gradually lowering tariffs among members). Politically, ASEAN intensified engagement with outside powers about regional security arrangements. In July 1993, during the 26th ASEAN Ministerial Meeting and Post Ministerial Conference held in Singapore, ASEAN foreign ministers agreed to establish the ASEAN Regional Forum (ARF). This decision was part of ASEAN's efforts to engage external partners in discussions on regional security arrangements, aiming to create constructive dialogue and consultation on political and security issues in the Asia–Pacific region. At the same time, ASEAN prepared for enlargement: Vietnam began attending some ASEAN meetings as an observer in anticipation of membership, participating in regular consultations during the annual ASEAN Foreign Ministers' Meetings, and engaging in various ASEAN cooperation programs across multiple sectors. Notably, ASEAN countries contributed personnel to the UN peacekeeping force in Cambodia, under the UNTAC mission, until Cambodia's UN-sponsored elections were held on 23‒28 May 1993. Though less enthusiastic in nation building, ASEAN was keen on ensuring lasting peace in Cambodia for its eventual inclusion to the organization under the "One Southeast Asia" vision.

In July 1994 Thailand hosted the inaugural meeting of the ASEAN Regional Forum (ARF), marking a significant development in Asia-Pacific security diplomacy. Established through ASEAN's initiative, the ARF became the first multilateral security forum in the region to bring together both ASEAN member states and major external powers such as the United States, China, Japan, Russia, India, Australia, Canada, and the European Union. The forum provided a platform for dialogue and confidence-building among former Cold War adversaries under ASEAN's leadership. In 1994, Vietnam also joined the ARF as a founding member, even as it prepared for ASEAN membership. Economically, AFTA came into force the same year, and initial tariff reductions took effect; intra-ASEAN trade began to grow under these preferential rates. ASEAN foreign ministers endorsed the ARF's concept of "confidence-building measures" and envisioned it evolving towards preventive diplomacy, guided by ASEAN's principles such as those in the TAC. The year also saw ASEAN address non-traditional security issues: ministers agreed to cooperate on fighting drug trafficking, and discussed the emerging issue of maritime piracy in regional waters.

== 1995–2008: Expansion and upheaval ==
=== One Southeast Asia ===
The accession of members from 1967 to 2025

ASEAN underwent its first post-Cold War enlargement and achieved a major security milestone. Vietnam officially joined ASEAN on 28 July 1995 as the association's seventh member. Vietnam's accession to ASEAN was widely regarded as a symbolic act of reconciliation. A decade after ASEAN had opposed Vietnam's military intervention in Cambodia, Hanoi's entry into the organization in 1995 marked a turning point toward regional inclusivity and cooperation. For Vietnam, then emerging from a period of international isolation and domestic upheaval following the Third Indochina War, ASEAN was seen as a crucial diplomatic gateway to reintegration into the international community and a platform to normalize its foreign relations. Later that year, ASEAN convened its fifth summit in Bangkok, Thailand (14–15 December 1995). There, the leaders signed the Treaty of Bangkok, formally known as the Southeast Asia Nuclear Weapon-Free Zone (SEANWFZ) Treaty. The SEANWFZ Treaty committed ASEAN members to not develop or station nuclear weapons, extending the denuclearized status of the region – an idea first mooted under ZOPFAN – and invited nuclear-weapon states to respect the zone. The treaty took effect on 28 March 1997, after all but one of the member states had ratified it. It became fully effective on 21 June 2001 after the Philippines ratified it, effectively banning all nuclear weapons in the region. Economically, with Vietnam on board, ASEAN adjusted AFTA timelines by giving new members a grace period; Vietnam signed on to AFTA, but was allowed a longer schedule to reduce its tariffs. ASEAN's economic ministers also agreed on an ASEAN Framework Agreement on Services (AFAS) to begin liberalizing trade in services. In the South China Sea, tensions spiked when China occupies Mischief Reef (claimed by the Philippines) in 1995, prompting ASEAN to express concern; China agreed to informal talks with ASEAN, which would continue sporadically in coming years.

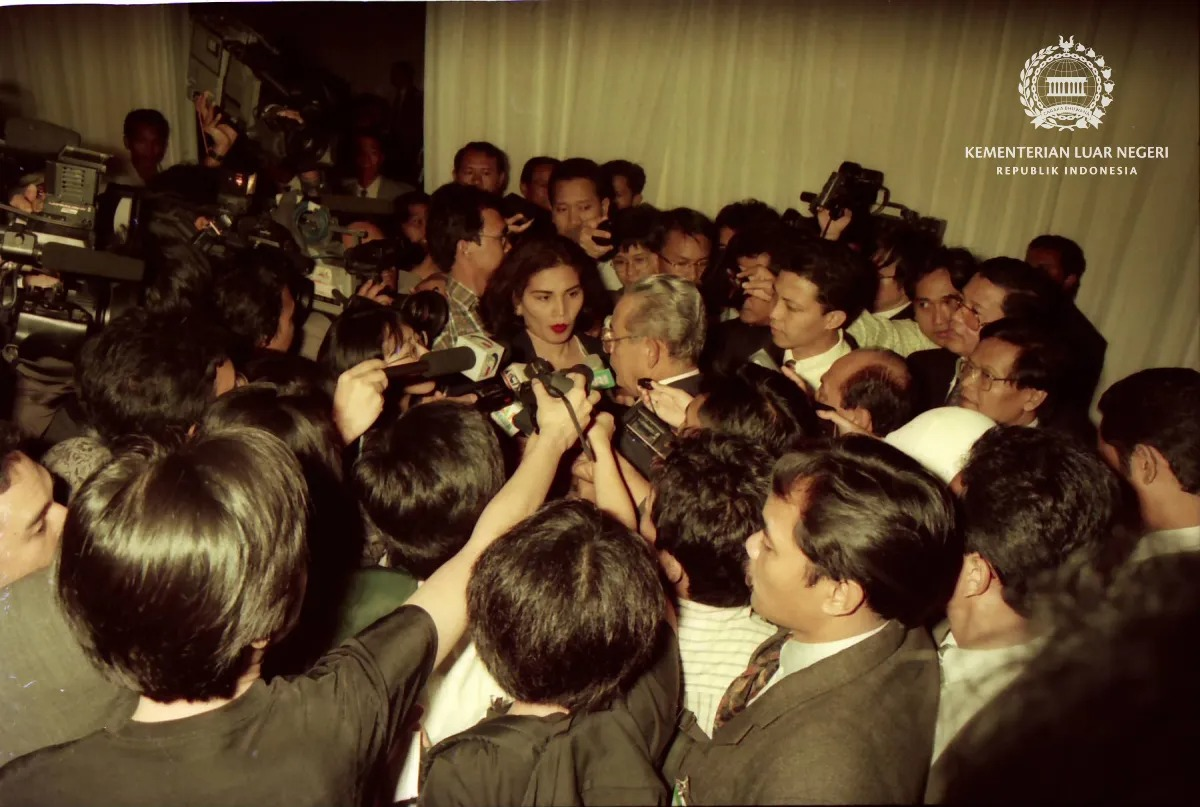
Reporters flock to an ASEAN representative during the 1st ASEAN Informal Summit, 30 November 1996

In 1996 ASEAN's focus was on laying groundwork for further expansion and strengthening external partnerships. Negotiations accelerated with Laos and Burma (now Myanmar), which were slated to join ASEAN the next year. Both countries attended ASEAN meetings as observers and aligned their policies with ASEAN norms (Burma, under an isolated military regime, saw ASEAN membership as a means to gain legitimacy and economic links – ASEAN pursued a policy of "constructive engagement" with Yangon despite Western criticism of Myanmar's human rights record). Malaysia staunchly pushed for the inclusion of Burma under the consideration of a strong organization and promises of reform, then backed by the New Order government in Indonesia led by Suharto.

In July 1996, at the annual ASEAN Ministerial Meeting (AMM) in Jakarta, India and Pakistan were accepted as ASEAN Sectoral Dialogue Partners, reflecting ASEAN's outreach to South Asia. In the same month, Russia was admitted to the ASEAN Regional Forum (ARF), having not participated in the forum's inaugural session in 1994. Russia's inclusion marked a further expansion of the ARF's geographic and strategic reach. In response to its growing membership, the ARF adopted new criteria to manage participation, including the affirmation that all members must respect and adhere to the forum's decisions and principles. These measures aimed to preserve the ARF's cohesion and effectiveness as a multilateral security dialogue platform. In March 1996, the first Asia–Europe Meeting (ASEM) summit was held in Bangkok, bringing together leaders of ASEAN (plus other East Asian countries) and the European Union for dialogue. ASEAN played a central role in ASEM's initiation, acting as the core of the Asian representation. Economically, ASEAN celebrated significant growth – by 1996, intra-ASEAN trade and investment were rising under AFTA, and discussions began on deeper integration measures (customs harmonization, standards). Culturally, ASEAN inaugurated the ASEAN Foundation in 1996 to promote people-to-people interaction and scholarships, recognizing the need to build an ASEAN identity beyond official circles.

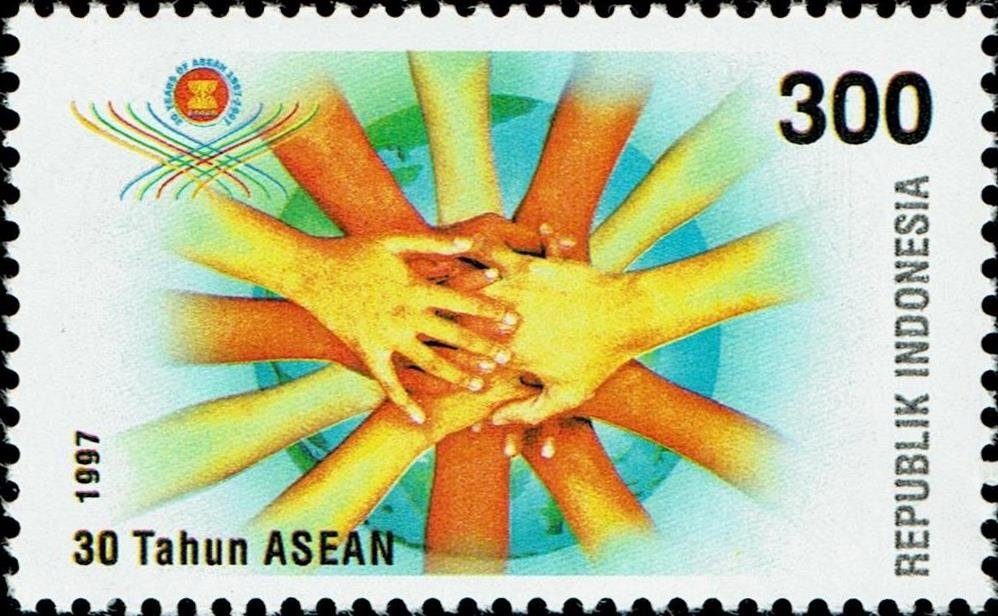
Stamp commemorating the 30th anniversary of ASEAN

In 1997 the association expanded to include Laos and Myanmar, which both joined ASEAN on 23 July 1997. Cambodia was to join at the same time as Laos and Myanmar, but a Cambodian coup in 1997 and other internal instability delayed its entry. To mark ASEAN's 30th anniversary, the leaders held an Informal Summit in Kuala Lumpur. There, they adopted ASEAN Vision 2020 on 15 December 1997. The ASEAN Foundation had also been expanded to include the goal of promoting the ASEAN identity and address issues such as poverty and socio-economic disparities among member states.

=== 1997 Asian financial crisis ===
Annual growth of GDP per capita in affected countries from 1995 to 2000

The 1997 Asian financial crisis, which began in Thailand in July and rapidly spread to Indonesia, Malaysia, the Philippines, and beyond severely impacted ASEAN economies – currencies crashed, GDPs contracted, and social unrest erupted, such as in the May 1998 riots of Indonesia. Regionally, the crisis tested ASEAN's cohesion and spurred the bloc to take unprecedented collective action. Initially, ASEAN had few instruments to deal with a financial meltdown – economic cooperation was limited and ASEAN's norms stressed non-interference in domestic affairs. However, as the crisis deepened, ASEAN members increasingly sought a coordinated response. Finance ministers began holding emergency consultations outside the regular schedule. Notably, a special ASEAN Finance Ministers' meeting was convened in Manila in November 1997, where for the first time the idea of a regional surveillance mechanism was raised.

A follow-up ministerial meeting in Kuala Lumpur on 1 December 1997 discussed the causes of the crisis and joint policy responses. In this meeting, ASEAN, together with China, Japan, and South Korea, convened the first ASEAN Plus Three (ASEAN+3) Summit. China, South Korea, and Japan spurred the meeting as it was largely prompted by the need to coordinate a response to the 1997 Asian financial crisis. The Kuala Lumpur gathering (and subsequent meetings in 1998–99) laid the groundwork for institutionalizing ASEAN+3 cooperation by 1999. One bold proposal that emerged in this period was the idea of an Asian Monetary Fund (AMF). Japan, frustrated with the slow international response, floated the AMF concept to the summit from another unrelated joint G7-IMF meetings in Hong Kong during 20–25 September 1997. As proposed in August/September 1997 as a $100 billion regional fund that Asian nations could draw on for crisis lending. This proposal was driven by Asian leaders' dissatisfaction with having to rely solely on the International Monetary Fund (IMF), where they had little influence. An AMF, funded and led by Asians, could in theory respond more quickly and tailor conditions to Asian realities. South Korea and several ASEAN countries found the idea attractive as they struggled with IMF programs. However, the AMF never materialized due to strong opposition from the United States and concerns in some quarters (including, initially, China) about duplication of the IMF. Seeing the opposition faced, Japan redirected its efforts into bilateral aid (such as the "Miyazawa Initiative" loans totaling $30 billion) and support via existing institutions like the World Bank and Asian Development Bank (ADB). Fallout from the AMF concept led to a less radical solution under the "Manila Framework" which reaffirms the central role of the IMF and continued regional-financial cooperation.

In February 1998 the ASEAN Finance Ministers met again in Jakarta and formally agreed to establish the ASEAN Surveillance Process (ASP). The ASP created a "peer review" system in which ASEAN finance ministries and central banks would regularly share financial data, monitor economic risks, and coordinate policies to prevent future crises. Though in practice this surveillance mechanism had limitations, it was a significant institutional reform – a first step toward mutual oversight of economic health within ASEAN. Another regional safety net was the ASEAN Swap Arrangement (ASA), a short-term liquidity fund that had existed since the 1970s among five original members. In the wake of the crisis, ASEAN moved to expand the ASA. They agreed to increase its resources and include all member states in the scheme. While tiny relative to the IMF packages, this swap facility symbolized ASEAN's resolve to help one another with emergency currency support.

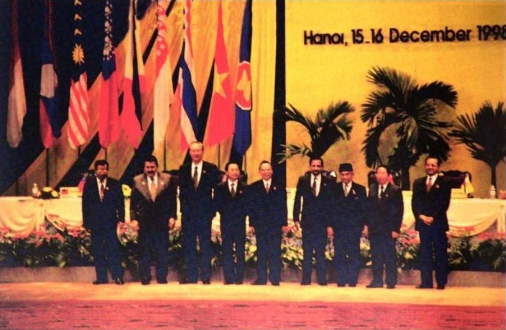
Heads of state & government of ASEAN countries pose for a family photo in Hanoi, 15 December 1998.

In 1998 ASEAN reeled back from the ongoing economic crisis and maintained momentum toward its Vision 2020. In December 1998, the Sixth ASEAN Summit was held in Hanoi, Vietnam (15–16 December), notably Vietnam's first time hosting a summit since joining. Despite the economic hardships, this summit issued the Hanoi Declaration and adopted the Hanoi Plan of Action (HPA). The HPA was ASEAN's first five-year action plan (1999–2004) to implement ASEAN Vision 2020, with measures to strengthen economic recovery, financial stability, and integration. This plan outlined measures to rebuild financial systems, strengthen banking supervision, and accelerate regional economic integration. ASEAN collectively reaffirmed its commitment to free-market principles and the ASEAN Free Trade Area (AFTA) even amid the downturn. It included initiatives for enhancing the ASEAN Free Trade Area's implementation, starting liberalization of services, and improving ASEAN investment climate. The Hanoi Summit also addressed ASEAN's expansion: Cambodia's admission to ASEAN was announced "in principle", pending resolution of its internal political situation (Cambodia had been set to join in July 1997 alongside Laos and Myanmar, but a coup in Phnom Penh in July 1997 delayed its entry). Politically during 1998, ASEAN members supported Indonesia's transition after President Suharto's resignation in 1998, and ASEAN affirmed non-interference regarding the fall of the New Order regime, while quietly encouraging stability in Indonesia.

In 1999 ASEAN achieved the goal of encompassing all ten countries in Southeast Asia. Following the stabilization of its government, Cambodia joined ASEAN on 30 April 1999, becoming the association's tenth member. To accommodate the less-developed new members (Vietnam, Laos, Myanmar, Cambodia, collectively often called the CLMV countries), ASEAN launched the Initiative for ASEAN Integration (IAI) in 1999, aimed at narrowing the development gap. This included special assistance and extended timelines for CLMV to implement ASEAN agreements. Regionally, 1999 was marked by the crisis in East Timor: after East Timorese voted for independence from Indonesia, violence erupted. ASEAN, adhering to non-interference, did not act as a group to intervene in what was then an Indonesian internal issue, but individually, ASEAN members (Thailand, Malaysia, Philippines, Singapore) contributed troops to the Australian-led UN-backed INTERFET peacekeeping force in East Timor in September 1999. Diplomatically, ASEAN and China in 1999 began talks to develop a code of conduct for the South China Sea, building on the 1992 ASEAN declaration. Meanwhile, in Manila, the ASEAN+3 process was consolidated with a second leaders' meeting and agreement to hold regular annual ASEAN+3 summits. In November 1999, the first ASEAN Plus One summit with China was held, at which China proposed a free trade area with ASEAN (this idea would later materialize as the ASEAN-China Free Trade Area in the 2000s). Economically, by the end of 1999, most ASEAN economies had rebounded from the crisis (with the notable exception of Indonesia, which was still recovering), and ASEAN collectively looked ahead to restoring high growth.

In May–July 2000 the finance ministers of ASEAN+3 meet in Chiang Mai, Thailand, and agree on the Chiang Mai Initiative (CMI), a network of bilateral currency swap arrangements among Asian countries intended to provide emergency liquidity in future. The CMI, essentially an extension of an earlier ASEAN Swap Arrangement, represents a concrete outcome of post-crisis regionalism and is hailed as a foundation for an Asian financial safety net. Within ASEAN, members start implementing the Hanoi Plan of Action, where steps are taken to harmonize customs procedures and integrate utilities and transportation networks. Politically, ASEAN foreign ministers endorse the idea of an ASEAN Troika (a three-member team) to address urgent regional issues, a mechanism tested when ASEAN deploys a ministerial Troika to facilitate dialogue in Cambodia in 2000. Currently innactive, the ASEAN Troika was to be an ad-hoc body to form and comprise all former and present foreign ministers of ASEAN nations, designed to discuss issues and problems that threatens regional peace. The Hanoi action plan also included efforts to harmonize customs procedures, modernize customs via training networks, reform valuation, risk management, ASEAN e‑Customs, and the ASEAN Single Window. The plan also called for the development of the Trans‑ASEAN transport network including roads, railways, ports, maritime corridors, and the ASEAN Highway and proposed Singapore–Kunming Rail Link.

In November 2000 an Informal ASEAN Summit in Singapore launches the Initiative for ASEAN Integration (IAI) to help newer members in projects in infrastructure, human resource development, and information technology are initiated for CLMV countries. Singapore pledged significant technical assistance funding. ASEAN also signs a cooperation agreement with China on the less sensitive area of development, while engaging China in discussions on a South China Sea code of conduct. Previously the 1st ASEAN–China Working Group meeting in Kuala Lumpur, 26 May 2000, produced a consolidated working draft negotiated since March.

=== Declaration of ASEAN Concord II ===
In 2006 ASEAN was given observer status at the United Nations General Assembly. In response, the organization awarded the status of "dialogue partner" to the UN. The UK and ASEAN were also considering a dialogue partnership.

== 2008–2017: Optimism in reformation ==
=== The ASEAN Charter ===
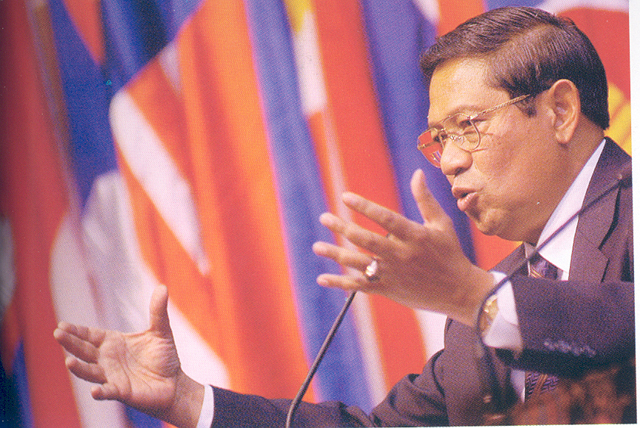
Susilo Bambang Yudhoyono, a firm believer of SEA unity, delivers remarks at the ASEAN Security Community Council Summit, 6 January 2005.

On 15 December 2008 the member states met in Jakarta to launch the charter signed in November 2007, to move closer to "an EU-style community". The charter formally established ASEAN as a legal entity, aiming to create a single trade bloc for a region encompassing 500 million people. Indonesian president Susilo Bambang Yudhoyono stated: "This is a momentous development when ASEAN is consolidating, integrating, and transforming itself into a community. It is achieved while ASEAN seeks a more vigorous role in Asian and global affairs at a time when the international system is experiencing a seismic shift". Referring to climate change and economic upheaval, he concluded: "Southeast Asia is no longer the bitterly divided, war-torn region it was in the 1960s and 1970s".

The 2008 financial crisis was seen as a threat to the charter's goals, and also set forth the idea of a proposed human rights body to be discussed at a future summit in February 2009. This proposition caused controversy, although the body would not have the power to impose sanctions or punish countries which violated citizens' rights and would, therefore, be limited in effectiveness. The body was established later in 2009 as the ASEAN Intergovernmental Commission on Human Rights (AICHR).

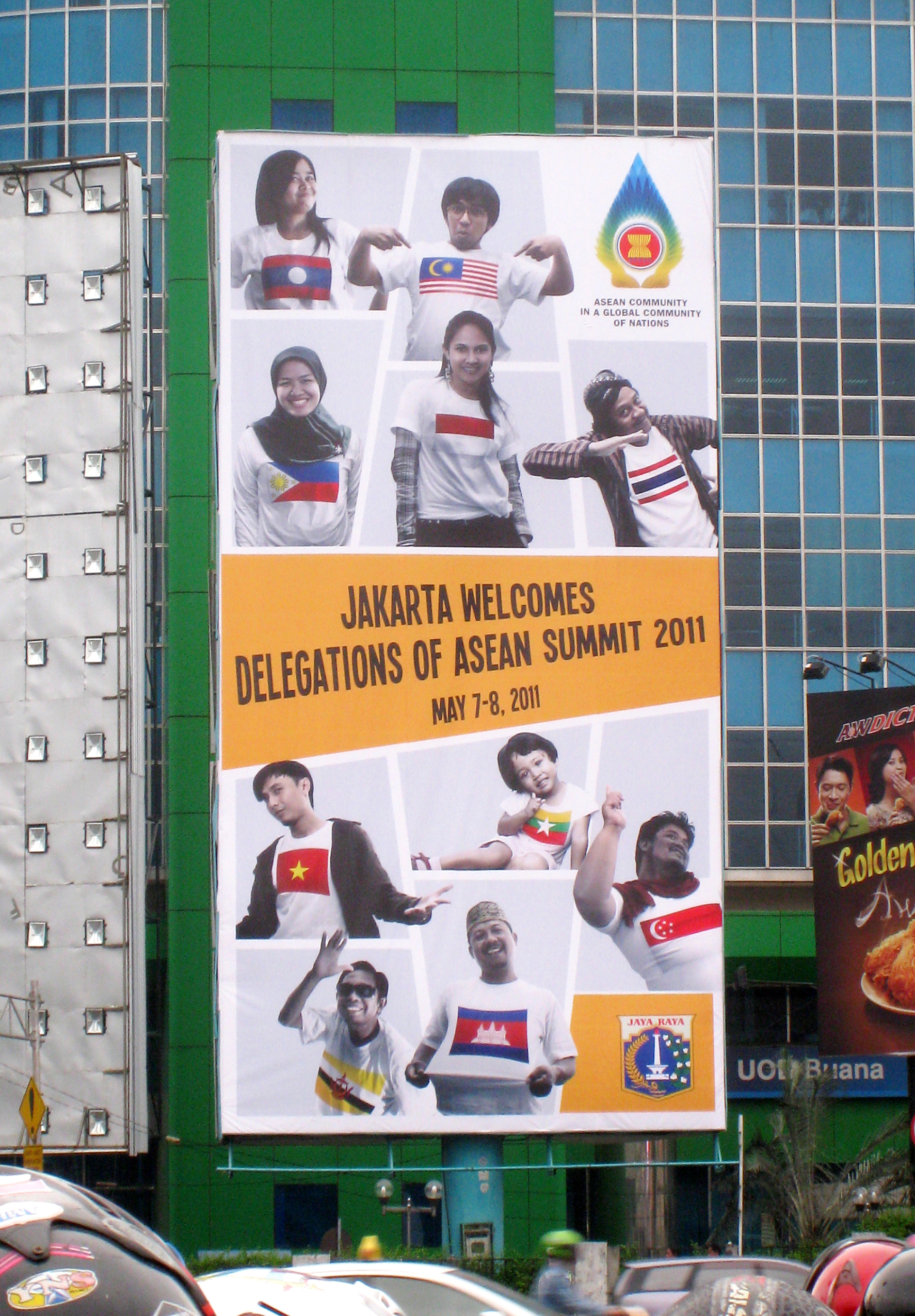
Billboard welcoming foreign delegates during the Indonesian chairmanship of ASEAN

In November 2012 the commission adopted the ASEAN Human Rights Declaration. However, their human rights declaration has been critiqued widely by the international community, with the United Nations High Commissioner for Human Rights stating that the declaration was worded in problematic ways that do not easily align with international norms. Likewise, the Human Rights Watch in the United States of America noted several important fundamental rights were omitted or not clearly established.

=== East Timorese question ===
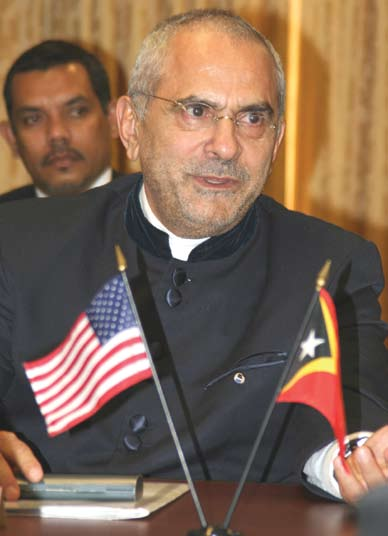
José Ramos-Horta hoped East Timor could join ASEAN before 2012.

Timor-Leste was part of Indonesia during the early years of ASEAN.

Upon becoming independent in 2002, Timor-Leste immediately began to seek ASEAN membership, seeing it as crucial to securing economic stability. However, its progress was slowed due to a lack of capacity and its much smaller economy.

In 2022 the ASEAN member states agreed to the ascension of Timor-Leste "in principle", although without a fixed timeline.

== 2017–present: Myanmar crisis ==
Since 2017 political, military and ethnic affairs in Myanmar have posed unusual challenges for ASEAN, creating precedent-breaking situations and threatening the traditions and unity of the group, and its global standing. ASEAN responses indicated possible fundamental change in the nature of the organisation.

=== Rohingya genocide ===
The Rohingya genocide erupted in Myanmar in August 2017, killing thousands of Rohingya people in Myanmar, driving most into neighbouring Bangladesh, and continuing for months. This created a global outcry demanding ASEAN take action against the civilian-military coalition government of Myanmar, which had long discriminated against the Rohingya.

As the Rohingya were predominantly Muslim (in Buddhist-dominated Myanmar), and the ethnic cleansing was framed in religious terms, other largely-Muslim ASEAN nations (particularly Malaysia, Indonesia, Singapore, and Brunei) objected, some strongly, and also objected to the burden of Rohingya refugees arriving on their shores (as did ASEAN neighbors Buddhist-dominated Thailand and Muslim-dominated observer-nation Bangladesh.) Myanmar's civilian leader, Aung San Suu Kyi, also reportedly asked ASEAN for help with the Rohingya crisis, in March 2018, but was rebuffed by ASEAN's chair, who said it was an "internal matter." ASEAN had a longstanding firm policy of "non-interference in the internal affairs of member nations," and was reluctant, as an organization, to take sides in the conflict, or act materially. Internal and international pressure mounted for ASEAN to take a firmer stance on the Rohingya crisis, and by late 2018, the group's global credibility was threatened by its inaction. In response, ASEAN began to put pressure on Myanmar to be less hostile to the Rohingya, and to hold accountable those responsible for atrocities against them.

But ASEAN's positions on the issue largely split on religious lines, with Muslim nations siding more with the Rohingya, while Buddhist nations initially sided more with Myanmar's government, threatening a sectarian division of ASEAN. Authoritarian ASEAN nations, too (mostly Buddhist), were less enthusiastic than democratic ASEAN nations (mostly Muslim), about holding Myanmar officials accountable for crimes against their Rohingya minority. However, by late 2018, most ASEAN nations had begun to advocate for a more forceful ASEAN response to the Rohingya crisis, and a harder line against Myanmar, breaking with the group's traditional policy of "non-interference" in members' "internal affairs", a break emphasized by the Rohingya crisis being formally placed on the December 2018 ASEAN summit agenda.

In early 2019 Bangladesh suggested that Myanmar create a safe haven for the Rohingya within its borders, under ASEAN supervision (later expanding that idea to include India, China and Japan among the supervisors). In mid-2019, ASEAN was heavily criticized by human rights organizations for a report, which ASEAN commissioned, which turned out to praise Myanmar's work on Rohingya repatriation, while glossing over atrocities and abuses against the Rohingya. The June 2019 ASEAN summit was shaken by the Malaysian foreign minister's declaration that persons responsible for the abuses of the Rohingya be prosecuted and punished, conduct unusually undiplomatic at ASEAN summits. ASEAN pressed Myanmar for a firm timeline for the repatriation of Rohingya refugees who fled Myanmar, pressuring Myanmar to provide "safety and security for all communities in Rakhine State as effectively as possible and facilitate the voluntary return of displaced persons in a safe, secure and dignified manner." In August 2019, the annual ASEAN Foreign Ministers' meeting concluded with a joint communique calling on Myanmar's government to guarantee the safety of all Rohingya, both in Myanmar and in exile, and pushed for more dialogue with the refugees about their repatriation to Myanmar. But later that month ASEAN's Inter-Parliamentary Assembly (AIPA) supported Myanmar's "efforts" on repatriation, with aid, restraining some members' desire for more intrusive proposals.

By January 2020 ASEAN had made little progress to prepare safe conditions for the Rohingya's return to Myanmar.

=== 2021 Myanmar coup ===
On 1 February 2021 the day before a newly elected slate of civilian leaders was to take office in Myanmar, a military junta overthrew Myanmar's civilian government in a coup d'etat, declaring a national state of emergency, imposing martial law, arresting elected civilian leaders, violently clamping down on dissent, and replacing civilian government with the military's appointees. Widespread protests and resistance erupted, and elements of the civilian leadership formed an underground "National Unity Government" (NUG). Global opposition to the coup emerged, and global pressure was brought on ASEAN to take action. Initially, ASEAN remained detached from the controversy, though Muslim-dominated members (mostly democracies, already vocal against the Rohingya genocide) expressed strong objection to the coup, while the mostly-Buddhist authoritarian members of ASEAN remained quiet.

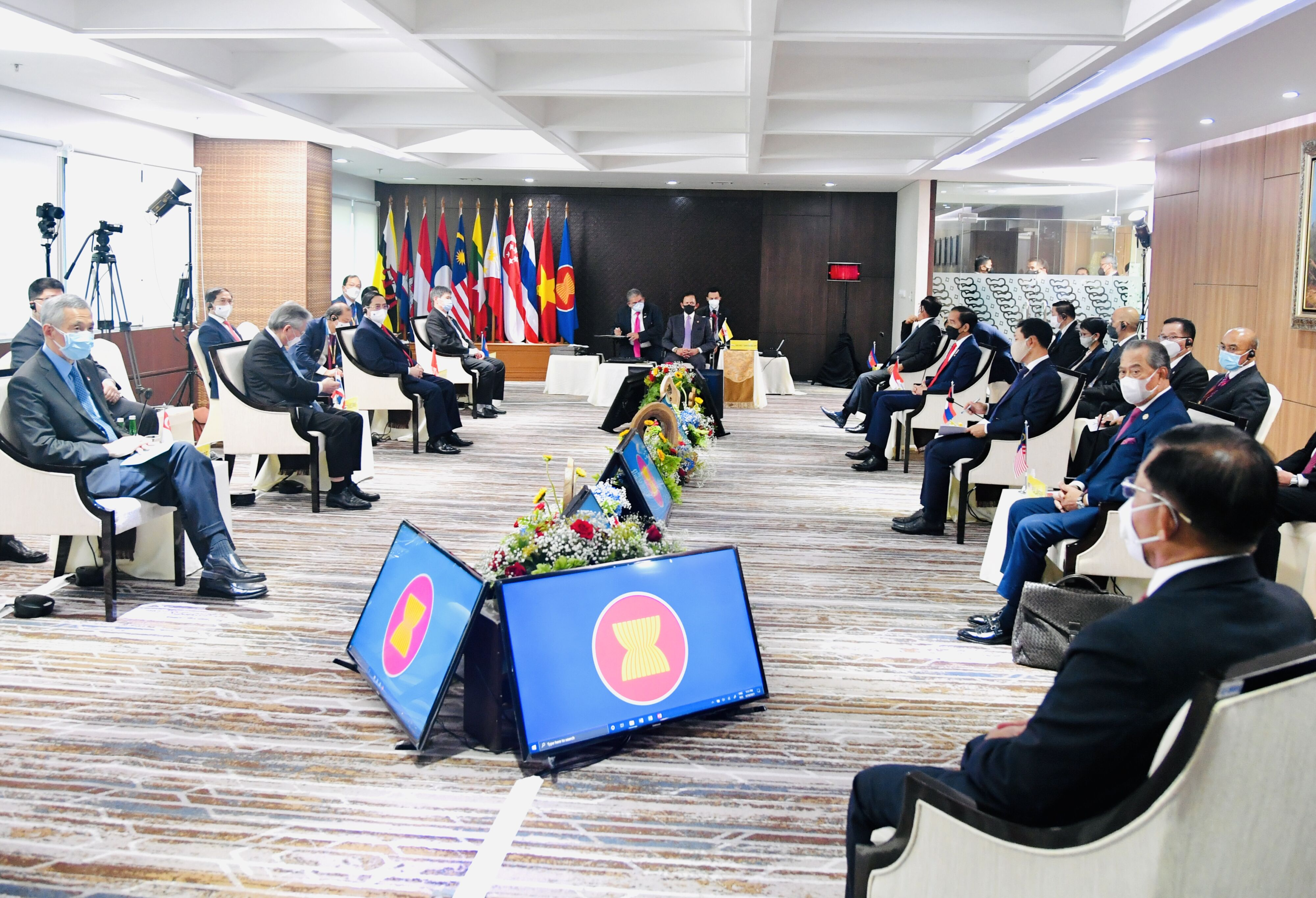
SEA leaders facing Myanmar's coup leader, Min Aung Hlaing, during the Special ASEAN Summit on the 2021 Myanmar coup d'etat

In April 2021, in the first-ever ASEAN summit called to deal primarily with a domestic crisis in a member state, ASEAN leaders met with Myanmar's coup leader, Senior General Min Aung Hlaing, and agreed to a five-point consensus solution to the crisis in Myanmar:

- The immediate cessation of violence in Myanmar;
- Constructive dialogue among all parties concerned... to seek a peaceful solution in the interests of the people;
- Mediation facilitated by an envoy of ASEAN's Chair, with the assistance of ASEAN's Secretary-General;
- Humanitarian assistance provided by ASEAN through its AHA Centre; and
- A visit to Myanmar, by the special envoy and delegation, to meet with all parties concerned.

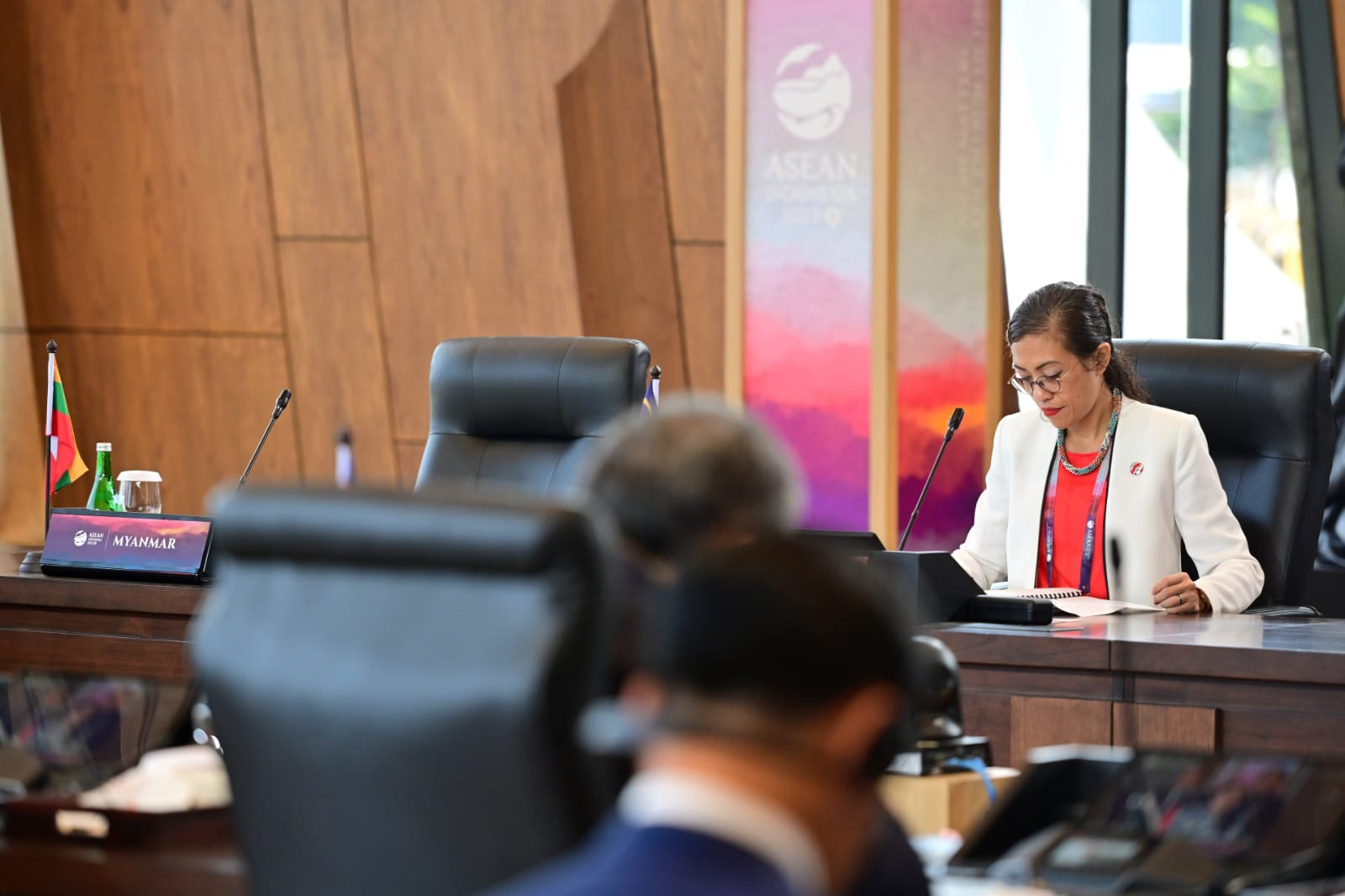
Myanmar's empty chair during the 42nd ASEAN Summit in Indonesia, 10 May 2023

The ASEAN agreement with Myanmar drew strong criticism from over 150 human rights organizations for its lax approach. Yet, the Myanmar junta did not comply with any of the points of the plan. On 18 June 2021, the United Nations General Assembly (UNGA), in a rare move, with a nearly unanimous resolution, condemned Myanmar's coup, and called for an arms embargo on the country. The UNGA consulted with ASEAN and integrated most of ASEAN's five-point consensus into the resolution (adding the demand that the junta release all political prisoners). However, while Communist Vietnam voted "yes," along with the ASEAN democracies (Indonesia, Malaysia, Singapore, and the Philippines), most authoritarian ASEAN states (Thailand, Laos, Cambodia and Brunei) abstained. An outlier, Timor-Leste voted abstention alongside ASEAN authoritarians. East Timorese officials later expressed their regret, with Ramos-Horta calling the vote a "vote of shame" and stated that the country may have isolated itself from the other members of the association.

In October 2021, despite its consensus agreement with ASEAN, Myanmar's junta refused to allow ASEAN representatives to speak with Myanmar's deposed and imprisoned civilian leader Aung San Suu Kyi. Following lobbying by the United Nations, United States, European Union, United Kingdom, and other nations, ASEAN declined to invite Hlaing to represent Myanmar at ASEAN's October 2021 summit, the first time in ASEAN's history that it did not invite a political leader from a member nation to one of its summits. Nor did ASEAN invite a representative of Myanmar's underground National Unity Government, saying it would consider inviting a non-political representative of the country, instead (though none was actually invited). The unusual ASEAN action was widely seen as a major setback for the Myanmar junta's attempt to achieve global recognition as the legitimate government of Myanmar, and a sign of broader change in the behaviour and role of ASEAN.

== See also ==
- Enlargement of ASEAN
  - Accession of Timor-Leste to ASEAN
  - Accession of Bangladesh to ASEAN
  - Accession of Papua New Guinea to ASEAN
  - Accession of Sri Lanka to ASEAN
- Pan-Asianism

Wider Southeast Asian history between World War II and the end of the Cold War in Asia 1945–1992

- End of World War II in Asia
- South East Asian League
- Bandung Conference
- Konfrontasi
- Domino Theory
- Vietnam War
- Asian Tiger
- 1997 Asian financial crisis

Wider Southeast Asian history after the end of the Cold War

- 1999 East Timorese independence referendum
- Myanmar conflict
- 2020–2021 Thai protests
