= Swap arrangement =

Swap arrangement may refer to:

- Currency swap
  - Central bank liquidity swap
- Stock swap
- Prisoner exchange
