= Chiang Mai Initiative =

Multilateral currency swap arrangement

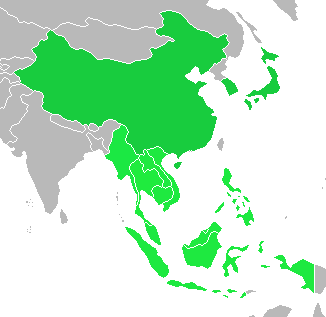
Participants of the Chiang Mai Initiative: regular ASEAN states marked light green; Plus Three states marked green

The Chiang Mai Initiative (CMI) is a multilateral currency swap arrangement among the ten members of the Association of Southeast Asian Nations (ASEAN), the People's Republic of China (including Hong Kong), Japan, and South Korea. It draws from a foreign exchange reserves pool worth US$120 billion and was launched on 24 March 2010. That pool has been expanded to $240 billion in 2012.

The initiative began as a series of bilateral swap arrangements after the ASEAN Plus Three countries met on 6 May 2000 in Chiang Mai, Thailand, at an annual meeting of the Asian Development Bank. After 1997 Asian financial crisis, member countries started this initiative to manage regional short-term liquidity problems and to avoid relying on the International Monetary Fund.

== History ==
=== Conception ===
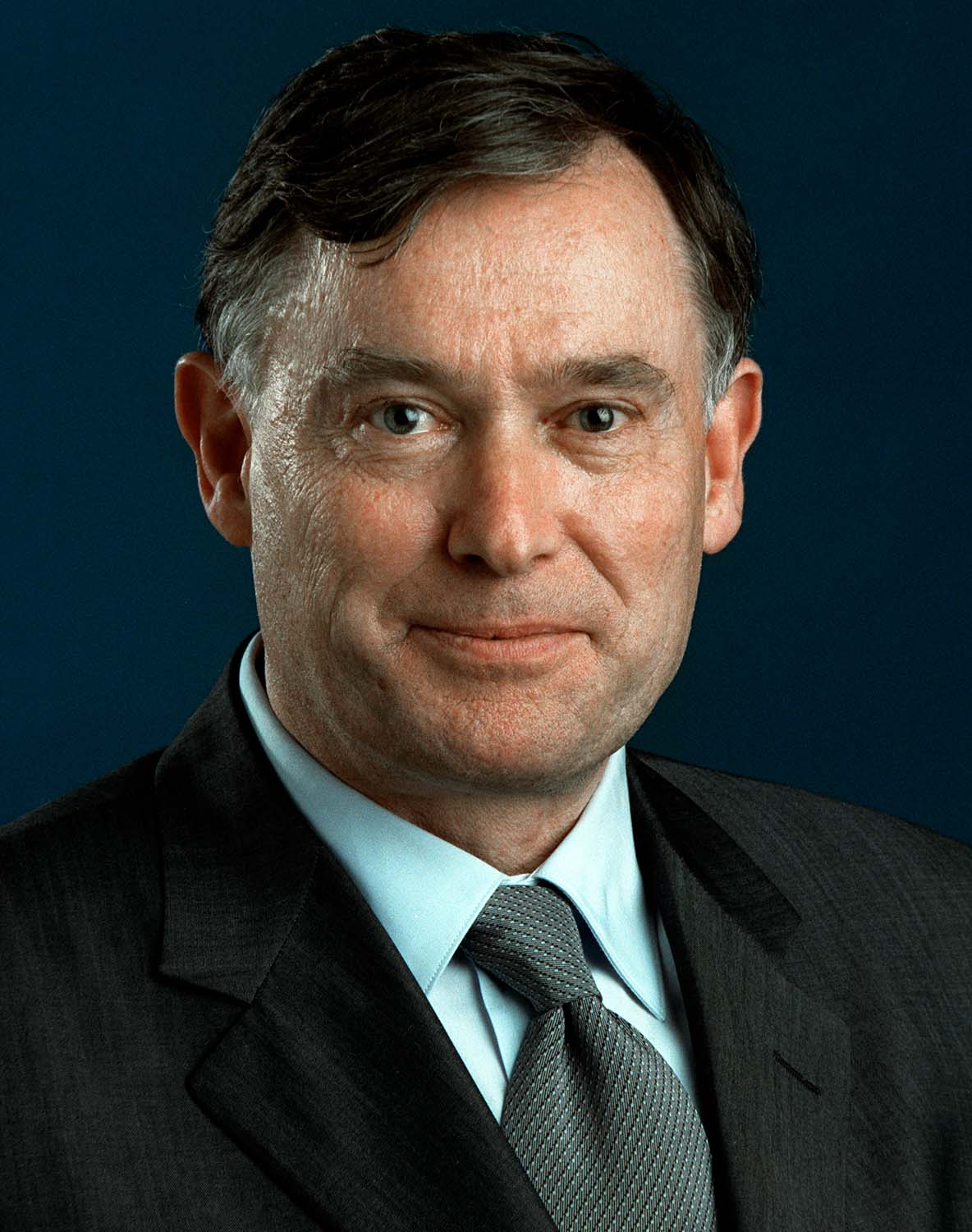
Former IMF Managing Director Horst Köhler: "Our advice [to the East Asian region] is to pursue regionalisation, not in opposition to the IMF, because the IMF is a global institution, but to do it in a complementary fashion".

At the height of the 1997 Asian financial crisis, Japanese authorities proposed an Asian Monetary Fund, which would serve as a regional version of the International Monetary Fund (IMF). However, this idea was shelved after encountering strong resistance from the United States. After the crisis, finance ministers of members of the Association of Southeast Asian Nations (ASEAN), the People's Republic of China, Japan, and South Korea met on 6 May 2000 at the 33rd Annual Meeting of the Board of Governors of the Asian Development Bank (ADB) in Chiang Mai, Thailand, to discuss the establishment of a network of bilateral currency swap agreements. The proposal was dubbed the Chiang Mai Initiative and intended to avoid a future recurrence of the Asian Financial Crisis. It also implied the possibility of establishing a pool of foreign exchange reserves accessible by participating central banks to fight currency speculation. The proposal would also supplement the financial resources of international institutions such as the IMF. Joint Ministerial Statement (JMS) was issued after the ASEAN+3 Finance Minister's Meetings have mentioned the development of the CMI.

Early critics questioned the reasoning behind the initiative. The Asia Times Online wrote in an editorial published several days after the meeting, "The idea that the existence of a currency swap arrangement or the wider concept of an Asian monetary fund [...] could have prevented the Asian crisis or the worst of it, is both wrong and politically noxious." After IMF Managing Director Horst Köhler visited five Asian nations, including Thailand, in June 2000, the Asia Times Online denounced his endorsement of "the ill-conceived and likely never to be implemented Asean plus three [...] currency-swap plan". In a 2001 interview with the Far Eastern Economic Review, Köhler stated that the CMI would promote regional economic co-operation and development and that he would not oppose the formation of an Asian Monetary Union.

=== Expansion ===
As of 16 October 2009, the network consisted of 16 bilateral arrangements among the ASEAN Plus Three countries worth approximately US$90 billion. Additionally, the ASEAN Swap Arrangement had a reserves pool of approximately US$2 billion.

=== Multilateralisation ===
In May 2007, at the 10th meeting of ASEAN+3 Finance Ministers the CMI further progress was agreed upon.

Foundation of CMI was meant to expand bilateral swaps of ASEAN. In addition, it was to aid the existing financial facilities of IMF. Nonetheless, the 2008 financial crisis proved that the CMI was not working up to its expectation and was in need of further development. Instead of seeking for CMI liquidity provision, Korea and Singapore used the US Federal Reserve as their way of securing liquidity, and Indonesia sought support from China and Japan. Consequently, policy-makers realised that the CMI needed a reserve pooling arrangement and took action to multilateralise the initiative. Hence, the Chiang Mai Initiative Multilateralisation (CMIM) Agreement was founded in 2009.

In February 2009, ASEAN+3 agreed to expand the fund to $120 billion up from the original level of $78 billion proposed in 2008.

During the April 2009 meeting of ASEAN finance ministers in Pattaya, Thailand, the individual contributions to be made by each member state toward the reserves pool were announced. Each of the six original ASEAN members—Indonesia, Malaysia, Singapore, the Philippines, and Thailand—agreed to contribute US$4.77 billion, while each of the remaining four members would contribute between US$30 million and US$1 billion. The ten countries were scheduled to meet their partners following the finance ministers' meeting, but the summit's cancellation due to the Thai political crisis delayed the launch of the multilateral agreement to a later date. When leaders of the thirteen countries finally met in Bali in May, they finalised the individual contributions of China, Japan, and South Korea. This summit also added Hong Kong as a new participant, whose contribution was added to that of China though Hong Kong remained "a monetary administration on its own". Its participation raised China's total contribution to US$38.4 billion, equal to that of Japan, and South Korea, which agreed to contribute US$19.2 billion. China and Japan remain the biggest contributors, each contributing 32 percent of total financial contributions. Including Korea, these three countries account for 80 percent of all the contributions made to CMIM while the remaining 20 percent is from ASEAN countries.

On 3 May 2012, 15th ASEAN+3 Finance Ministers and Central Bank's Governors’ meeting was held in Manila, Philippines which made an agreement about expanding CMIM from current $120 billion to 240 billion. The ASEAN+3 also agreed to adopt the CMIM Precautionary Line (CMIM-PL), which is designed on the model of PPL program within the IMF to prevent the financial crisis. In addition, IMF de-linked portion is raised from 20 percent to 30 percent and with its future goal of reaching 40 in the year 2014. Regarding the expanded funding of CMIM, countries now can receive up to $30 billion.

The Chiang Mai Initiative Multilateralisation (CMIM) Agreement was signed on 28 December 2009, and took effect on 24 March 2010.

On 11 November 2026, an amendment to the CMIM agreement entered into force, introducing the Rapid Financing Facility (CMIM-RFF). The facility provides support through currency swaps to members facing urgent balance-of-payments needs caused by sudden external shocks, including natural disasters and pandemics. The amendment also allowed drawings under the CMIM Precautionary Line to be renewed.

== Participants ==
Bloomberg estimated that participants of the Chiang Mai Initiative held more than US$4.1 trillion of foreign exchange reserves in 2009.

Flag	Country	Currency	Central bank	2013 Nominal GDP (millions of US$)	2013 PPP GDP (millions of US$)	Financial contribution (millions of US$)	Maximum borrowing (millions of US$)
People's Republic of China	China and Hong Kong	yuan and dollar	People's Bank of China and Hong Kong Monetary Authority	9,300,911 (Note: The individual nominal GDP of the People's Republic of China and of Hong Kong are US$9,020,309 million and US$280,682 million respectively.)	14,009,813 (Note: The individual PPP GDP of the People's Republic of China and of Hong Kong are US$13,623,255 million and US$386,558 million respectively.)	38,400 (Note: Hong Kong's US$4,200 million contribution is included in that of the People's Republic of China.)	19,200
	Japan	yen	Bank of Japan	5,149,897	4,778,523	38,400	19,200
	South Korea	won	Bank of Korea	1,258,586	1,687,138	19,200	19,200
	Indonesia	rupiah	Bank Indonesia	946,391	1,314,660	4,770	11,925
	Thailand	baht	Bank of Thailand	424,985	701,554	4,770	11,925
	Malaysia	ringgit	Bank Negara Malaysia	327,911	532,515	4,770	11,925
	Singapore	dollar	Monetary Authority of Singapore	286,925	338,551	4,770	11,925
	Philippines	peso	Bangko Sentral ng Pilipinas	284,472	457,314	3,680	9,200
	Vietnam	đồng	State Bank of Vietnam	155,952	343,024	1,000	5,000
	Cambodia	riel	National Bank of Cambodia	15,672	39,734	120	600
	Myanmar (Burma)	kyat	Central Bank of Myanmar	57,439	96,812	60	300
	Brunei Darussalam	dollar	Brunei Currency and Monetary Board	16,451	22,305	30	150
	Laos	kip	Bank of the Lao P.D.R.	10,262	21,083	30	150

=== ASEAN ===
Foreign exchange reserves of ASEAN members
Country	Foreign exchange reserves (US$)	Figure as of
Brunei Darussalam	50,000,000,000	December 2007
Cambodia	3,732,000,000	Dec 2012
Indonesia	107,269,160,000	Apr 2013
Laos	822	Dec 2012
Malaysia	140,312,200,000	Apr 2013
Myanmar (Burma)	3,600,000,000	November 2009
Philippines	83,951,540,000	Mar 2013
Singapore	261,678,000,000	Apr 2013
Thailand	177,803,000,000	Mar 2013
Vietnam	20,900,000,000	Dec 2012

=== People's Republic of China ===
China holds the world's largest foreign exchange reserves, which reached US$1 trillion in November 2006. The figure doubled in the second quarter of 2009 and had risen by almost 14 times within the past decade. According to a Deutsche Bank official, "China's reserves will allow the [United States] to run a higher fiscal deficit than other nations". This deficit was caused by the US government's additional spending in an effort to revive the economy from a recession. The reserves reached US$2.27 trillion in September 2009, and the country's sovereign wealth fund—the China Investment Corporation—had become more aggressive in its foreign investments.

=== Japan ===
Japan possesses the second largest foreign exchange reserves. It became the second country to reach US$1 trillion in reserves in February 2008. In contrast to China, which places "stringent" control on its currency, the Japanese government has not placed any control on the yen since 2004. The reserves reached US$1.06 trillion in October 2009.

=== South Korea ===
South Korea ranked sixth in foreign exchange reserves, which reached US$270.9 billion in November 2009. It accounted for 6.4 percent of the total ASEAN Plus Three reserves and 8 percent of the combined gross domestic product of the participating countries in 2009. The Korea Times wrote in an editorial that the country should act as a mediator between China and Japan, whose equal contributions meant that both "should refrain from racing for regional hegemony in the cooperative grouping".

== See also ==
- Comprehensive Economic Partnership for East Asia
- Asian Monetary Unit
