= Currency swap =

Currency swap may refer to:

- Cross-currency swap, a financial derivative
- Foreign exchange swap, a simultaneous purchase and sale of identical amounts of one currency for another with two different value dates
- Central bank liquidity swap, a swap line between central banks
