= Asian Monetary Fund =

The Asian Monetary Fund (AMF) was an idea put forward by the Japanese government during the 1997 Asian financial crisis at the G7-IMF meetings in Hong Kong during September 20–25, 1997, that was never implemented. The proposal was that an institution be formed to work towards setting up a regional network funded by Asian countries to overcome current and future economic crisis.

During the Asian financial crisis, Asian leaders had difficulties in dealing with both regional and international institutions such as the Association of Southeast Asian Nations (ASEAN) and particularly the International Monetary Fund (IMF). Countries such as Indonesia, Republic of Korea, and Thailand had to turn to bailouts from the IMF. However, the strict conditions of the IMF bailouts evoked discontent among Asian countries. This discontent was largely because Asian nations had little leverage on IMF crisis resolution measures despite the IMF being an international organisation. Another source of discontent was due to the financial volatility concerning the US dollar. More specifically, difficulties had arisen because for most of the 1990s, countries such as Thailand and Indonesia had largely implemented fixed exchange-rate systems with their currencies generally pegged to the US dollar.

The proposal to establish an AMF led to sharp disagreement between Japanese and United States officials because the US Treasury, which had not been consulted on the proposal, did not support the idea of creating an AMF. In the face of this opposition from the US and a reluctance to support it from China, the Asian Monetary Fund was never established.

In 2023, the Malaysian Prime Minister, Anwar Ibrahim, sought for the creation of an AMF. While China is open to the idea, Indonesia remained cautious, stating that the ASEAN membership has to commit to the idea and seeking approval among the ASEAN membership would not be easy, and it would also be hard to get participating members to commit to the proposed funds.

== See also ==
- African Monetary Fund
- Arab Monetary Fund
- European Stability Mechanism
