= Central bank liquidity swap =

Type of currency swap

Central bank liquidity swap, known as a swap line, is a type of cross-currency swap used by a country's central bank to provide liquidity of its currency to another country's central bank. In a liquidity swap, the lending central bank uses its currency to buy the currency of another borrowing central bank at the market exchange rate, and agrees to sell the borrower's currency back at a rate that reflects the interest accrued on the loan. The borrower's currency serves as collateral.

== Swap line prehistory ==
Avatars of the later currency swap lines first appeared in the period 1880–1920, when central banks exchanged gold reserves at need; but the first actual currency swap lines (between eight central banks) were set up in the 1960s: they were activated and used by three jurisdictions, the Bank of England, the Bank of Canada, and the US. The swap lines were briefly re-established after the September 11 attacks, but only became of global importance during the 2008 financial crisis.

== Reason for liquidity swaps ==
Although often criticized by the domestic audience as a "bailout" of foreign banks, liquidity swaps are structured to protect the interests of the lending bank, and are often self-serving rather than purely altruistic. Minutes of the 2008 US Federal Open Market Committee (FOMC) meeting at which the final decision was made show that members focused on countries with large holdings of U.S. dollar mortgage-backed securities, which might be tempted to dump them all at once if they lacked easier access to dollars, thereby forcing up mortgage rates and impeding recovery in the United States. Similarly, swap lines from the European Central Bank, Swiss, and Nordic central banks to Iceland and the Eastern European countries in 2008 were due in large part to households and businesses in these countries taking out Euro and Swiss Franc denominated mortgages.

== US dollar swaps ==
U.S. dollar swap lines are the most well-established and well-utilized, due to the status of the U.S. dollar as the world's main reserve currency, its liquidity, and its perception as a safe-haven currency. In the United States, the Federal Reserve operates swap lines under the authority of Section 14 of the Federal Reserve Act and in compliance with authorizations, policies, and procedures established by the FOMC.

On December 12, 2007, the Federal Open Market Committee (FOMC) announced that it had authorized temporary reciprocal currency arrangements, or central bank liquidity swap lines, with the European Central Bank and the Swiss National Bank to help provide liquidity in U.S. dollars to overseas markets. The swaps were initially capped at $24 billion, but in the crisis of autumn 2008 the cap was expanded to a total $620 billion, before in October the ECB, SNB, Bank of Japan and Bank of England were all given unlimited dollar access. Subsequently, the FOMC authorized liquidity swap lines with additional central banks. The swap lines were designed to improve liquidity conditions in U.S. and foreign financial markets by providing foreign central banks with the capacity to deliver U.S. dollar funding to institutions in their jurisdictions during times of market stress.

As of April 2009, swap lines were authorized with the following institutions: the Reserve Bank of Australia, the Banco Central do Brasil, the Bank of Canada, Danmarks Nationalbank, the Bank of England, the European Central Bank, the Bank of Japan, the Bank of Korea, the Banco de Mexico, the Reserve Bank of New Zealand, Norges Bank, the Monetary Authority of Singapore, Sveriges Riksbank, and the Swiss National Bank. The FOMC authorized these liquidity swap lines through October 30, 2009. By November 2011, swap agreements were extended until February 2013, at lower interest rates.

Immediately prior to the COVID-19 pandemic, the U.S. Federal Reserve had standing U.S. dollar liquidity swap lines with the Bank of Canada, the Bank of England, the Bank of Japan, the European Central Bank, and the Swiss National Bank. On March 20, 2020, it extended this arrangement to nine more central banks, comprising US$60 billion each with the Monetary Authority of Singapore, Reserve Bank of Australia, Banco Central do Brasil, Danmarks Nationalbank, Bank of Korea, and Banco de Mexico, and US$30 billion each with the Reserve Bank of New Zealand, Norges Bank and Sveriges Riksbank, in order to lessen strains in global U.S. dollar funding markets due to the pandemic, and mitigate their effects on the supply of credit to households and businesses across the world. On March 31, 2020, these efforts were further expanded with a new program allowing these banks to use their holdings of US Treasury securities as collateral for overnight US dollar loans, in order to "help support the smooth functioning of the US Treasury market by providing an alternative temporary source of US dollars other than sales of securities in the open market".

=== Revenue and cost impacts ===
The foreign currency that the originating bank acquires is an asset on its balance sheet. In tables 1, 9, and 10 of the H.4.1 statistical release, the dollar value of amounts that the foreign central banks have drawn but not yet repaid is reported in the line "Central bank liquidity swaps". Because the swap will be unwound at the same exchange rate that was used in the initial draw, the dollar value of the asset is not affected by changes in the market exchange rate. The dollar funds deposited in the accounts that foreign central banks maintain at the Federal Reserve Bank of New York are a Federal Reserve liability. In principle, draws would initially appear in tables 1, 9, and 10 in the line "foreign and official" deposits. However, the foreign central banks generally lend the dollars shortly after drawing on the swap line. At that point, the funds shift to the line "deposits of depository institutions".

When a foreign central bank draws on its swap line to fund its dollar tender operations, it pays interest to the Federal Reserve in an amount equal to the interest the foreign central bank earns on its tender operations. The Federal Reserve holds the foreign currency that it acquires in the swap transaction at the foreign central bank (rather than lending it or investing it in private markets) and does not pay interest. The structure of the arrangement serves to avoid domestic currency reserve management difficulties for foreign central banks that could arise if the Federal Reserve actively invested the foreign currency holdings in the marketplace.

The Federal Reserve Board issues a weekly release that includes information on the aggregate value of swap drawings outstanding. During the 2008 financial crisis and the bankruptcy of Lehman Brothers on September 15, 2008, the balance grew rapidly. As of April 2009 the balance was $293,533 million. Central bank liquidity swaps have maturities ranging from overnight to three months. Table 2 of the H.4.1 statistical release reports the remaining maturity of outstanding central bank liquidity swaps.

By September 2011, the total of lending by the Fed had come to $10 trillion (or standardised to 1-month loans, $4.45 trillion), over half of which had gone to the ECB: all loans were repaid in full, and profits made by the Fed on swap repayments in 2008-9 alone came to c. $4 billion.

== Euro swaps and repos ==
During the euro area crisis, the European Central Bank (ECB) provided euro liquidity to Hungary and Denmark

On 25 June 2020, in the early phase of the COVID-19 pandemic, the ECB announced the Eurosystem Repo Facility for Central Banks (EUREP), intended as a precautionary backstop to address liquidity stresses. The ECB initially signaled that EUREP would expire at end-June 2021, but later renewed it.

In 2020, the Central Bank of Kosovo announced that it had signed a repo agreement under EUREP for €100 million. In 2022, the Central Bank of Montenegro announced that it had gained access to EUREP for €250 million. On 17 January 2023, the ECB indicated that EUREP was used as a consequence of the Russo-Ukrainian war.

As of 8 September 2025, the ECB maintained the following liquidity line arrangements:

- unlimited standing reciprocal swap lines with the other central banks forming the so-called swap line network: Bank of Canada, Bank of Japan, Swiss National Bank, Bank of England, and Federal Reserve System;
- a limited reciprocal swap line with the People's Bank of China, established until 8 November 2028 and capped at €45 billion / CNY 350 billion;
- standing limited non-reciprocal swap lines with the Danmarks Nationalbank (capped at €24 billion) and Sveriges Riksbank (capped at €10 billion);
- EUREP repo lines extended on a non-reciprocal basis until 31 January 2027 to, respectively, the National Bank of Romania (€4.5 billion), Hungarian National Bank (€4 billion), Bank of Albania and National Bank of North Macedonia (€400 million each), Central Bank of Montenegro (€250 million), Central Bank of Kosovo and Central Bank of San Marino (€100 million each), and Andorran Financial Authority (€35 million).

Eurosystem repo facilities rely on high-quality euro-denominated collateral, whereas swap lines are backed in the counterparty's currency.

On 14 February 2026, the ECB announced an enhancement of its EUREP facility "in principle, for all central banks", while keeping its swap lines unchanged. The announcement was viewed as supporting a greater international role of the euro.

== China swaps ==
Since 2009, China has signed bilateral currency swap agreements with thirty-two counterparties. The stated intention of these swaps is to support trade and investment and to promote the international use of renminbi. Broadly, China limits the amount of renminbi available to settle trade, and the swaps have been used to obtain renminbi after these limits have been reached.

In 2015, Argentina drew on the China swap line in order to bolster the country's foreign exchange reserves. The Central Bank of Argentina reportedly converted the renminbi received through the swap into other currencies to facilitate the import of goods, which had become difficult after Argentina defaulted on its debt in July 2014.

== Other swaps ==
- During the euro area crisis, the Swiss National Bank provided liquidity to Poland and Hungary in exchange for euros
- During the 2008–2011 Icelandic financial crisis, the Swedish central bank provided liquidity to Iceland, Latvia and Estonia; the Norwegian central bank provided liquidity to Iceland; and the Danish central bank provided liquidity to Iceland and Latvia
- South Korea has signed bilateral currency swap agreements with eight counterparties. These include a currency swap with Canada for an unlimited amount and infinite time period signed in 2017 and limited amounts with China, Switzerland, Indonesia, Australia, UAE, Malaysia and Turkey, named in the order of amount signed.
- Qatar and Turkey signed a currency swap agreement in August 2018 worth US$15 billion
- China and Turkey signed a currency swap agreement in August 2018 worth US$6 billion
- Japan and India signed a currency swap agreement worth US$75 billion in October 2018

== Multilateral swaps ==
=== The Chiang Mai Initiative ===
The Chiang Mai Initiative began as a series of bilateral currency swap agreements between the Association of Southeast Asian Nations (ASEAN) countries, the People's Republic of China, Japan, and South Korea after the 1997 Asian financial crisis. These were subsequently multilateralized in 2010 into a single agreement, the Chiang Mai Initiative Multilateralization (CMIM). Despite standing at US$240 billion as of 2014, these swap lines have never actually been used.

=== BRICS Contingent Reserve Arrangement ===
The BRICS Contingent Reserve Arrangement was established in 2014 to provide a standing facility for multilateral dollar liquidity swaps between the BRICS countries, with a total capital of US$100 billion.
