= Accession of Papua New Guinea to ASEAN =

Ongoing accession process of Papua New Guinea to ASEAN

ASEAN (blue) and Papua New Guinea (red)

Flag of Papua New Guinea

The possibility of accession of Papua New Guinea to the Association of Southeast Asian Nations is currently a matter of discussion.

== Background ==
As early as 1987, Papua New Guinea's membership in the Pacific Islands Forum (PIF) was viewed as an obstacle to its joining ASEAN. In 2009, the country asked for the support of the Philippines in its ASEAN bid, however, no official response was heard as it was election season. The incumbent conservative Filipino administration which Papua New Guinea contacted and supported, dramatically lost to a more liberal administration in the 2010 Philippine election.

Indonesia is the only ASEAN member supporting Papua New Guinea's membership. Singapore, Malaysia, and Brunei have shown dissatisfaction over Papua New Guinea's economic status which has hindered its acceptance into ASEAN. Laos and Myanmar have no official position in regards to the country's ASEAN application.

Papua New Guinea has enjoyed observer status in ASEAN since 1976. Benefits Papua New Guinea has cited to ASEAN members from the country's accession include the possibility of tapping into Papua New Guinea's lead industries such as oil and gas, mining and seafood. In 2015, Papua New Guinea appointed a special envoy to resolve issues related to ASEAN, demonstrating its determination to promote full membership of ASEAN. Papua New Guinea is also taking the necessary steps to prepare for integration.

In July 2026, ASEAN Secretary-General Kao Kim Hourn declared that it is not possible for Papua New Guinea to join ASEAN due to its geographic location outside of southeast Asia, unless the alliance amends its charter which is unlikely.

== Foreign relations with ASEAN member states ==
- Indonesia (16 September 1975)
- Philippines (16 September 1975)
- Thailand (14 May 1976)
- Singapore (19 May 1976)
- Malaysia (12 July 1976)
- Brunei (1 May 1984)
- Vietnam (3 November 1989)
- Laos (6 April 1990)
- Myanmar (24 July 1991)
- Cambodia (7 October 1996)
- Timor-Leste (19 July 2002)

== Issues ==
Violent crime, political instability, poor infrastructure, discriminatory laws, and unskilled labor are obstacles preventing Papua New Guinea from joining, as well as the fact that the country is closer, culturally and geographically, to the Pacific islands to its east and that it is historically and financially tied more closely to Australia in the south, as unlike Timor-Leste, PNG was not directly administered by the colonial governments that controlled the Southeast Asian colonies. PNG was partially administered by Germany before being administered by Australia (with a brief stint under British control in the 1800s) until its independence. This is in contrast to Timor-Leste, which was occupied by Indonesia and is commonly regarded as part of Southeast Asia.

== See also ==
- Enlargement of ASEAN
  - Accession of Bangladesh to ASEAN
  - Accession of Sri Lanka to ASEAN
  - Accession of Timor-Leste to ASEAN (fulfilled)
