= Accession of Timor-Leste to ASEAN =

Timor-Leste (red) and the rest of ASEAN (blue)

Timor-Leste became a member state of the Association of Southeast Asian Nations on 26 October 2025 during the 47th ASEAN Summit, finishing a two-decade accession process.

The island nation was recognised as an observer to ASEAN soon after it gained independence in May 2002. By 2007, all of its political parties supported closer ties with the organisation, and leaders declared a "strategic decision" to seek membership. The country applied for membership in 2011, and ASEAN agreed in principle to admit the country and make it a formal observer in 2022.

Timor-Leste has the smallest GDP in the ASEAN by far. Its GDP is less than 15% of Laos, the member state with the second-smallest GDP.

== Accession requirements ==
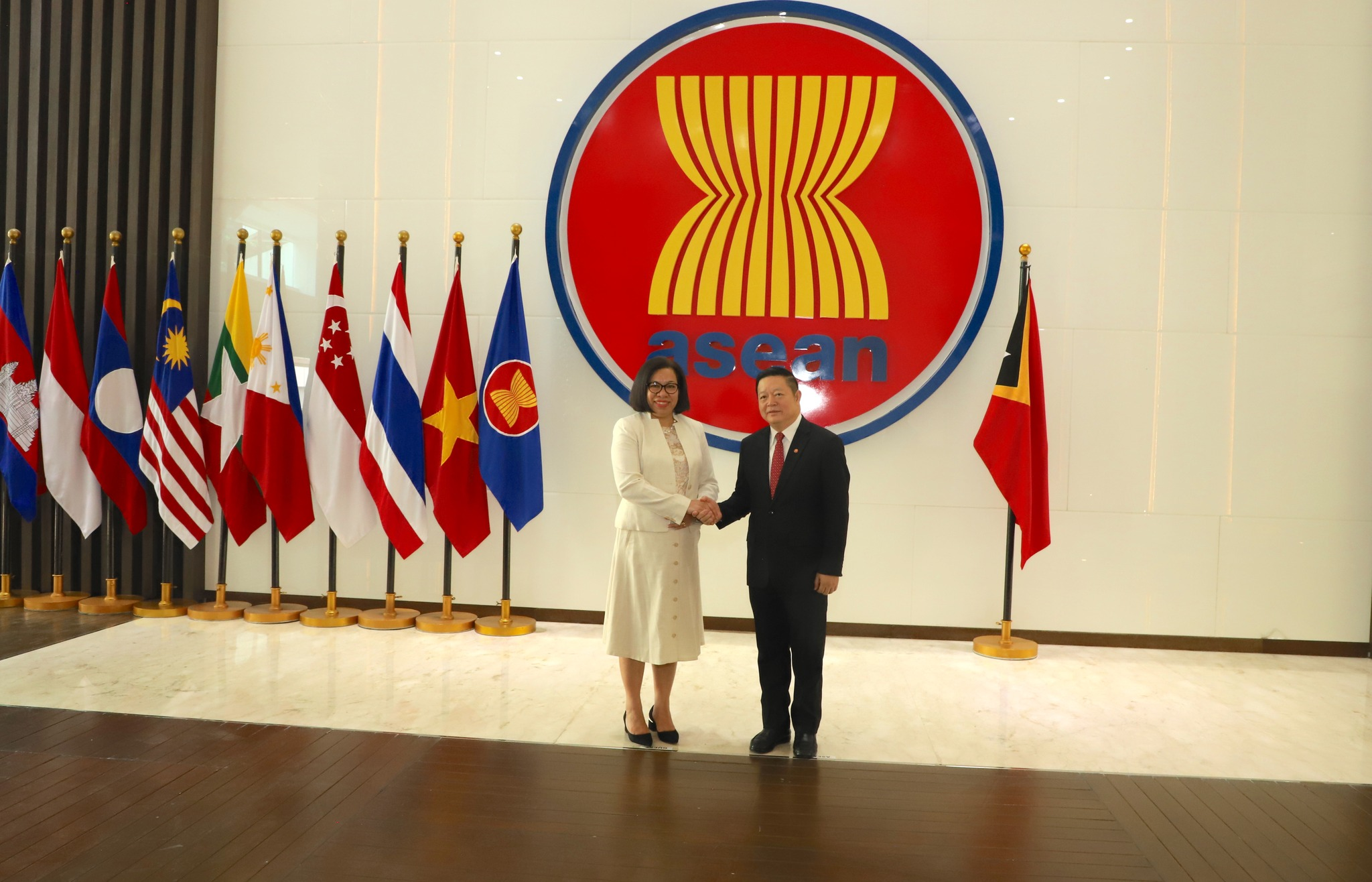
Timor-Leste's Minister of Foreign Affairs and Cooperation, Adaljíza Magno, visits the ASEAN Secretariat. Hosted by Kao Kim Hourn

The ASEAN Charter defines the following criteria for membership:

- The state must be geographically located in Southeast Asia.
- The state must be recognised by all ASEAN member states.
- The state must agree to be bound by the ASEAN Charter
- The state must be able and willing to carry out the obligations of membership such as:
  - Maintaining embassies in all current member countries of the bloc
  - Attending all ministerial meetings and summits
  - Acceding to all treaties, declarations and agreements in the bloc

=== Timor-Leste membership issues ===
To become a member of ASEAN, Timor-Leste needed to fully meet the organisation's conditions and obligations, which include the ability to meet the requirements for participation in the three main pillars of political-security (APSC), economic (AEC), and socio-cultural (ASCC). While there are no membership requirements pertaining to a country's level of development, some countries had historically opposed Timor-Leste's accession due to its underdeveloped economy. Indonesia, Malaysia, Brunei, Thailand, Cambodia, the Philippines and Myanmar supported Timor-Leste in its desire for full membership, but concerns were expressed behind closed doors that ASEAN already had enough problems with Myanmar. Singapore in particular was skeptical as to whether Timor-Leste would be able to cope with accession, objections that were finally overcome in 2025.

Timor-Leste is one of the poorest countries in Asia, facing many challenges including maintaining security, economic development, efforts to combat corruption in the national budget, and being heavily dependent on oil exports, which account for up to 80–90% of its revenue. Additionally, improving healthcare and education systems is a priority. The country's infrastructure is also relatively underdeveloped, and the literacy rate is approximately 72% as of 2022. According to the World Bank's data, in 2012, Timor-Leste had a population of 1.2 million people and a GDP of US$1.29 billion, which is only 15% of the smallest economy within ASEAN, which is Laos with a GDP of US$9.2 billion. Thus fast tracking Timor-Leste's accession to ASEAN was seen as too hasty at the time.

By 2015, Timor-Leste had fulfilled three major requirements: the country was located in Southeast Asia, was recognised by all ASEAN member states, and has opened embassies in all ASEAN member countries.

The 2023 roadmap to membership included a number of steps Timor-Leste needs to fulfil, including the capacity to host large meetings and sufficient English-speaking government staff.

== Timeline of relations with ASEAN ==
| Date | Event |
|---|---|
| 20 May 2002 | Timor-Leste gains its independence from Indonesia and is recognised as an ASEAN observer. |
| 26 July 2005 | After a case-by-case review and a delay in Pakistan's admission to the ASEAN Regional Forum due to India's disagreement, Timor-Leste joins the ASEAN Regional Forum, during the Twelfth Meeting of the ARF in Vientiane, Laos. |
| 13 January 2007 | Timor-Leste accedes to the Treaty of Amity and Cooperation in Southeast Asia. |
| 4 March 2011 | Timor-Leste officially applies for membership in ASEAN. |
| 6 July 2019 | ASEAN fact-finding mission on Timor-Leste is formed. This fact-finding mission investigates the eligibility and readiness of Timor-Leste to join the ASEAN Community. This consists of three pillars: the ASEAN Political-Security Community (APSC), the ASEAN Economic Community (AEC) and the ASEAN Socio-Cultural Community (ASCC). |
| 22 July 2019 | Timor-Leste sends delegations to the ASEAN Secretariat Technical Meeting. A delegation of 20, the largest ever delegation of East Timorese Government officials to visit the ASEAN Secretariat prior to Timor-Leste's joining, led and coordinated by the Directorate-General for ASEAN Affairs in the Ministry of Foreign Affairs and Cooperation. The delegation is composed of Director-Generals and Focal Points from line ministries working towards ASEAN accession across all the three pillars. This covers various important issues, which include learning about the ASEAN institutional framework and organic structure, decision-making bodies and processes, legal instruments and agreements, and technical cooperation. |
| 3 September 2019 | APSC Screening of Timor-Leste starts. |
| 6 July 2022 | ASCC Screening of Timor-Leste starts. |
| 19 July 2022 | AEC Screening of Timor-Leste starts. During the three-day AEC Fact-Finding Mission, delegates met with key Timor-Leste ministries/government agencies involved in the country's accession to the ASEAN Economic Agreements, including the Ministry of Finance, the Ministry of Petroleum and Minerals, the Ministry of Tourism, Trade and Industry, the Ministry of Agriculture and Fisheries, the Ministry of Public Works, the Ministry of Transport and Communication, the Customs Authority, and the Secretariat of State for Professional Training and Labor (SoSPTE). There were also meetings with Timor-Leste's Chambers of Commerce and Industry, as well as the business community. |
| 11 November 2022 | ASEAN agrees "in principle" to admit Timor-Leste; the country gains observer status at all high-level ASEAN meetings. |
| 11 May 2023 | ASEAN members finalise a dedicated road map for Timor-Leste to facilitate its full membership in the bloc. The roadmap requires Timor-Leste to align its laws and institutions with all three ASEAN pillars (APSC, AEC, and ASCC), improve human resources with strong English capacity to participate in ASEAN meetings, and upgrade basic infrastructure like airports, ports, roads, telecommunications, and hotels. It also includes readiness to contribute financially to ASEAN and to host and coordinate ASEAN activities. |
| 25 October 2025 | Timor-Leste deposited its instruments of accession to ASEAN, and accedes to the Southeast Asian Nuclear-Weapon-Free Zone Treaty. |
| 26 October 2025 | Timor-Leste is elevated to an ASEAN member state with signing of the Declaration on the Admission of Timor-Leste into ASEAN. |

=== Foreign relations with ASEAN member states ===
- Thailand (20 May 2002)
- Brunei (20 May 2002)
- Malaysia (20 May 2002)
- Philippines (20 May 2002)
- Singapore (20 May 2002)
- Indonesia (2 July 2002)
- Vietnam (28 July 2002)
- Cambodia (29 July 2002)
- Laos (29 July 2002)
- Myanmar (26 September 2006)

==== Observer state ====
- Papua New Guinea (22 July 2002)

== History ==
=== Early relations ===
In 2002, Timor-Leste was recognised as an observer of ASEAN and joined the ASEAN Regional Forum in 2005. After being admitted to the ASEAN Regional Forum (ARF) in July 2005, the application to join ASEAN was submitted in Kuala Lumpur on 28 July 2006. In preparation for accession, the country acceded to the Treaty of Amity and Cooperation in Southeast Asia in January 2007, pledging to renounce the use of force and binding Timor-Leste to non-interference in the internal affairs of ASEAN member states. In August 2007, the ASEAN states declared their willingness in principle to admit Timor-Leste.

In 2005, Timor-Leste said it wanted to be a member by 2010. In December 2007 President José Ramos-Horta restated that joining was a top priority, and he hoped to join by 2012. In January 2009, Thai Prime Minister Abhisit Vejjajiva said that his country would support Timor-Leste's membership of ASEAN by 2012.

In 2010, Timor-Leste attended the ASEAN summits as a "special guest of the presidency".

=== Accession delays ===
Timor-Leste officially applied for membership in ASEAN on 4 March 2011. As months passed, Prime Minister Xanana Gusmão put the brakes on hopes over joining ASEAN in 2011, stating that the country still lacked the necessary "human resources". After elections in 2012, the new government reaffirmed their commitment to joining the association. While Indonesia, which Timor-Leste gained their independence from in 2002, has pushed for them to be granted ASEAN membership, other countries, such as Singapore and Laos, have objected on the grounds that Timor-Leste is not yet developed enough to join. However, after the ASEAN summit in April 2013, Secretary General of ASEAN Lê Lương Minh stated that all member states supported Timor-Leste's admission to the association, although he also said that the country was not yet qualified for membership. Philippine President Benigno Aquino III pledged his country's support to Timor-Leste's ASEAN membership in June 2013. The Philippines has previously supported Timor-Leste's ASEAN membership through official documents in 2002 and 2010.

By September 2013, the ASEAN's Coordinating Council Working Group was still evaluating Timor-Leste's membership application, and Minh said that there was no timeline for when the assessment would be completed. Singapore pledged that it would not block Timor-Leste's membership in the association but did not explicitly support it, stating that plans for economic integration must not be derailed by the country's accession. In November 2013, U Aung Htoo, ASEAN Affairs Department deputy director, said that Timor-Leste would not be ready to join in 2014 since they do not have an embassy in all 10 current ASEAN member states, a necessity for membership.

In 2015, Timor-Leste said it is now ready to join the association at any time, telling via Timor-Leste's ambassador to Malaysia that their country had at least fulfilled two major requirements for ASEAN membership. The Philippines re-echoed its support for Timor-Leste's accession to ASEAN on the same year.

In 2017, the Philippines, a close ally of Timor-Leste, became the ASEAN host for 2017. However, ASEAN bypassed Timor-Leste's membership in 2017, mostly because of its lack of human resources which was pointed out by Singapore. Despite this, it was announced that Timor-Leste Prime Minister Mari Alkatiri will continue Timor-Leste's participation in ASEAN as an observer during the 2017 summit. The Philippines, Indonesia, Thailand, and Cambodia reiterated Timor-Leste's membership application during the summit, but 6 member states led by Singapore did not support the move.

In 2018, Timor-Leste's application for membership was still being studied by the association. Despite Singapore being historically opposed to Timor-Leste's accession to the association due to economic reasons, the country began to openly state that they are welcoming the country's membership application when the Timorese Prime Minister visited the latter.

On 2 July 2025, Myanmar officially notified Malaysia, the 2025 ASEAN chair, of its opposition to Timor-Leste joining the bloc in October 2025, citing interference in its internal affairs. Timor-Leste has reportedly supported the opposing democratic forces in the ongoing civil war. Timor-Leste rejected the criticisms and stated it had fulfilled all membership requirements.

=== Fact-finding mission ===
In 2019, ASEAN formed a fact-finding mission to visit the country in September to determine its readiness in joining the association. In June 2019, several ASEAN ministers reiterated their support for Timor-Leste's membership bid.

In 2021, Timor-Leste voted to abstain in a United Nations resolution which aimed to condemn the military dictatorship in Myanmar which ousted the democratically elected government of Aung San Suu Kyi. The vote was influenced by ASEAN chair Cambodia, who also voted to abstain alongside the ASEAN states of Brunei, Laos, and Thailand, while Indonesia, Malaysia, the Philippines, Singapore, and Vietnam supported the resolution. East Timorese officials later expressed their regret, with Ramos-Horta calling the vote a "vote of shame" and stated that the country may have isolated itself from the other members of the association.

Following his 2022 re-election, Ramos-Horta reiterated the country's desire to join ASEAN, aiming for a 2023 admission when Indonesia is set to chair the organisation. He later criticised the lengthy process of joining the organisation, stating that "It seems as if to reach ASEAN, you have to fulfill all the criteria to enter heaven. And then the next step is ASEAN."

== Negotiation progress ==
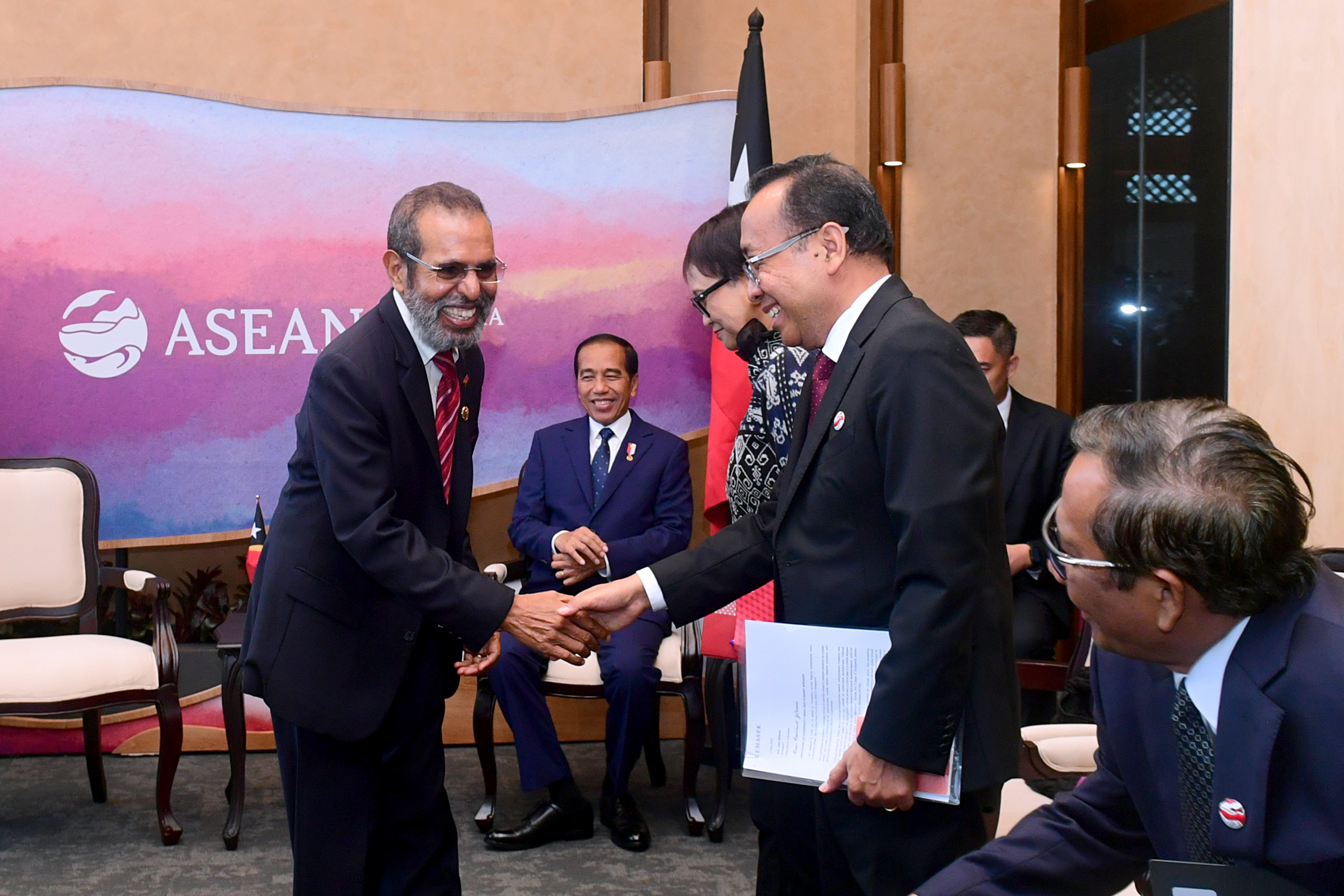
Timor-Leste, represented by Taur Matan Ruak, welcomed to its first high-level meeting in ASEAN in May 2023

In November 2022, following the 40th and 41st ASEAN Summit in Phnom Penh, the organisation issued a statement agreeing "in principle" to Timor-Leste's membership, granting Timor-Leste observer status at high-level meetings and stating that a roadmap to full membership would be submitted in the 2023 summit.

In February 2023, the country made its debut at a foreign ministerial-level meeting of ASEAN, appearing at the ASEAN Ministers' Meeting held in Jakarta.

At the 42nd ASEAN Summit held in Labuan Bajo in May 2023, Timor-Leste participated in its first high-level ASEAN meeting, with Prime Minister Taur Matan Ruak representing the country. The event marked a milestone in Timor-Leste's regional integration efforts where a roadmap to Timor-Leste's accession was adopted. During the summit's speechmaking sessions, the Prime Minister appeared visibly shook, reflecting the significance and pressure of the occasion as the nation took its initial steps on the ASEAN diplomatic stage. Prime Minister Taur Matan Ruak expected to be admitted at the end of 2023.

However, after another change of government, Prime Minister Xanana Gusmão declared in August 2023 that Timor-Leste would not join ASEAN as a democratic state as long as military governments, such as in Myanmar, were accepted in the organisation. At the following ASEAN summit in Jakarta, ASEAN encouraged Timor-Leste to continue working to fulfil the requirements for accession.

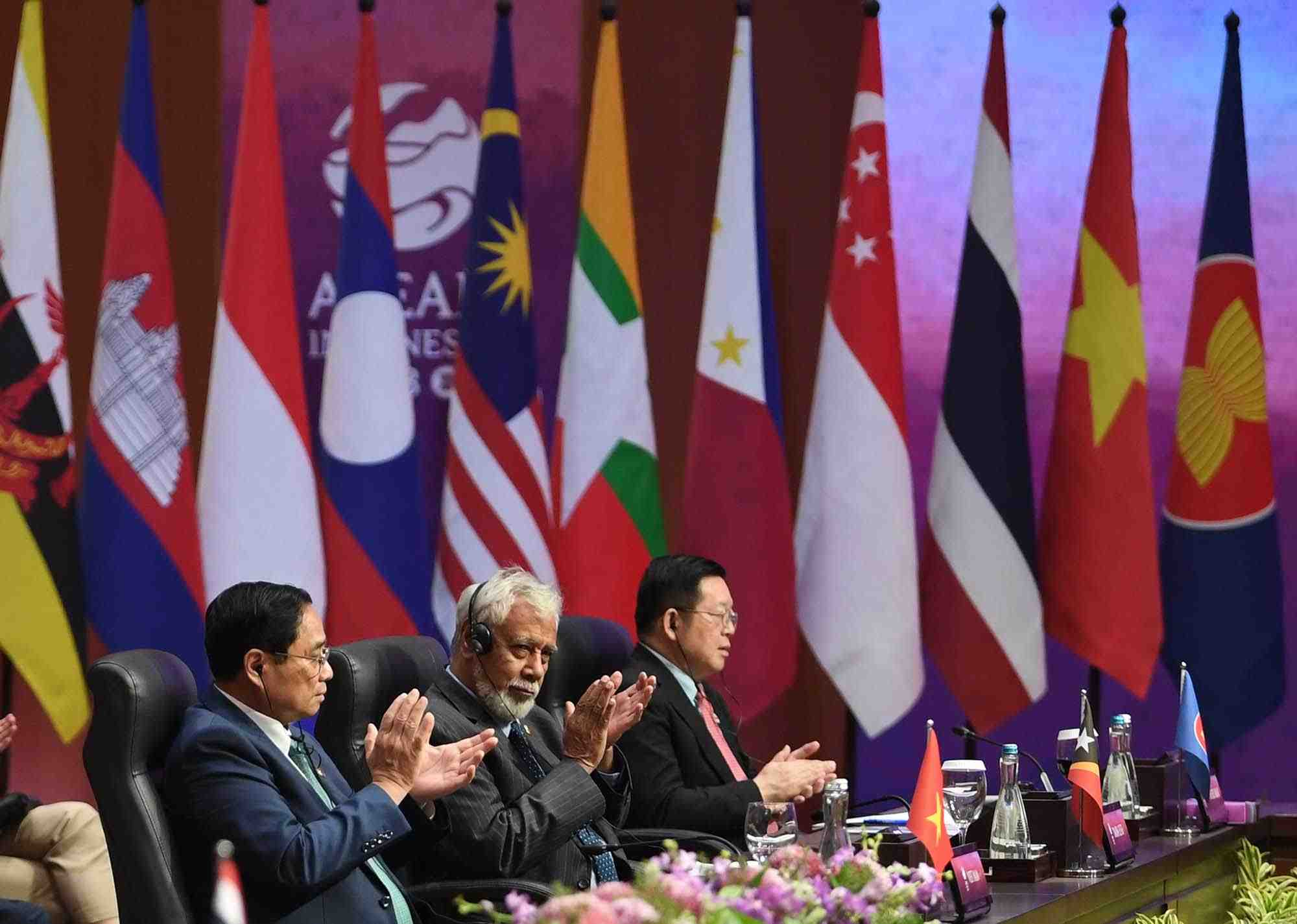
Xanana Gusmao attends the ASEAN-Canada Summit in Jakarta, 3 September 2023

At the 46th ASEAN Summit, Prime Minister Gusmão led the Timorese delegation, which included several government officials actively involved in high-level discussions. In the lead-up to the summit's plenary session, the delegation participated in key meetings of ASEAN's three community pillars, Political-Security, Economic, and Socio-Cultural, to report on the progress made in implementing the accession roadmap. Vice Minister for ASEAN Affairs Milena Rangel attended the ASEAN Senior Officials Meeting (SOM) on May 24, where she was joined by Vice Minister of Trade and Industry Augusto Júnior Trindade to sign a Memorandum of Understanding with the Economic Research Institute for ASEAN and East Asia (ERIA). The agreement aims to support the development of public policies aligned with ASEAN integration objectives.

With the 47th ASEAN Summit looming in October 2025 identified as a likely milestone for accession, Malaysian Prime Minister Anwar Ibrahim officially announced that Timor-Leste has made significant progress in fulfilling the ASEAN roadmap adopted in 2023. He described this moment as historic not only for Timor-Leste but for the broader ASEAN community, noting that the country had met six out of seven key accession pillars. He noted the operationalisation of the ASEAN Secretariat's dedicated Task Force Unit for Timor-Leste and confirmed that member states had begun internal legal processes in preparation for formal accession, scheduled for October 2025.

The signing ceremony of the Declaration on the Admission of Timor Leste to ASEAN.

Supporting this momentum, Malaysian Foreign Minister Mohamad Hasan confirmed that Timor Leste had completed a substantial portion of the legal instruments required for entry, 66 out of 84, mostly under the economic pillar, and that ASEAN member states would now begin their respective domestic processes to finalise accession by October. Support from key member states in advancements in national institutional capacity building, including Malaysia, Laos, and the Philippines, strengthened Timor-Leste's case. ASEAN foreign ministers meeting in Kuala Lumpur expressed broad support for Timor-Leste's bid and commended its implementation efforts. During the 25th ASEAN Economic Community Council Meeting, Vice Prime Minister and Coordinating Minister of Economic Affairs Francisco Kalbuadi Lay stated that nearly all ASEAN member states had expressed support for Timor-Leste's full membership. Timor-Leste completed the final step of ASEAN membership on 26 October 2025.

== Public opinion ==
=== In Timor-Leste ===
A 2018 National Public Opinion Survey by the International Republican Institute, sponsored by USAID, recorded that 76% of East Timorese supported full membership in ASEAN, with 11% having never heard of it, 8% responding 'Don't know/Refused to answer,' and only 5% expressing opposition to joining. In the same poll, 77% of people expressed a very favourable outlook towards ASEAN (an increase of 5%, from 72% in 2016), 13% held a somewhat favourable outlook, 4% had a somewhat unfavourable outlook, 1% felt strongly unfavourable, while 5% responded with 'Don't know/Refused to answer.'

=== In ASEAN ===
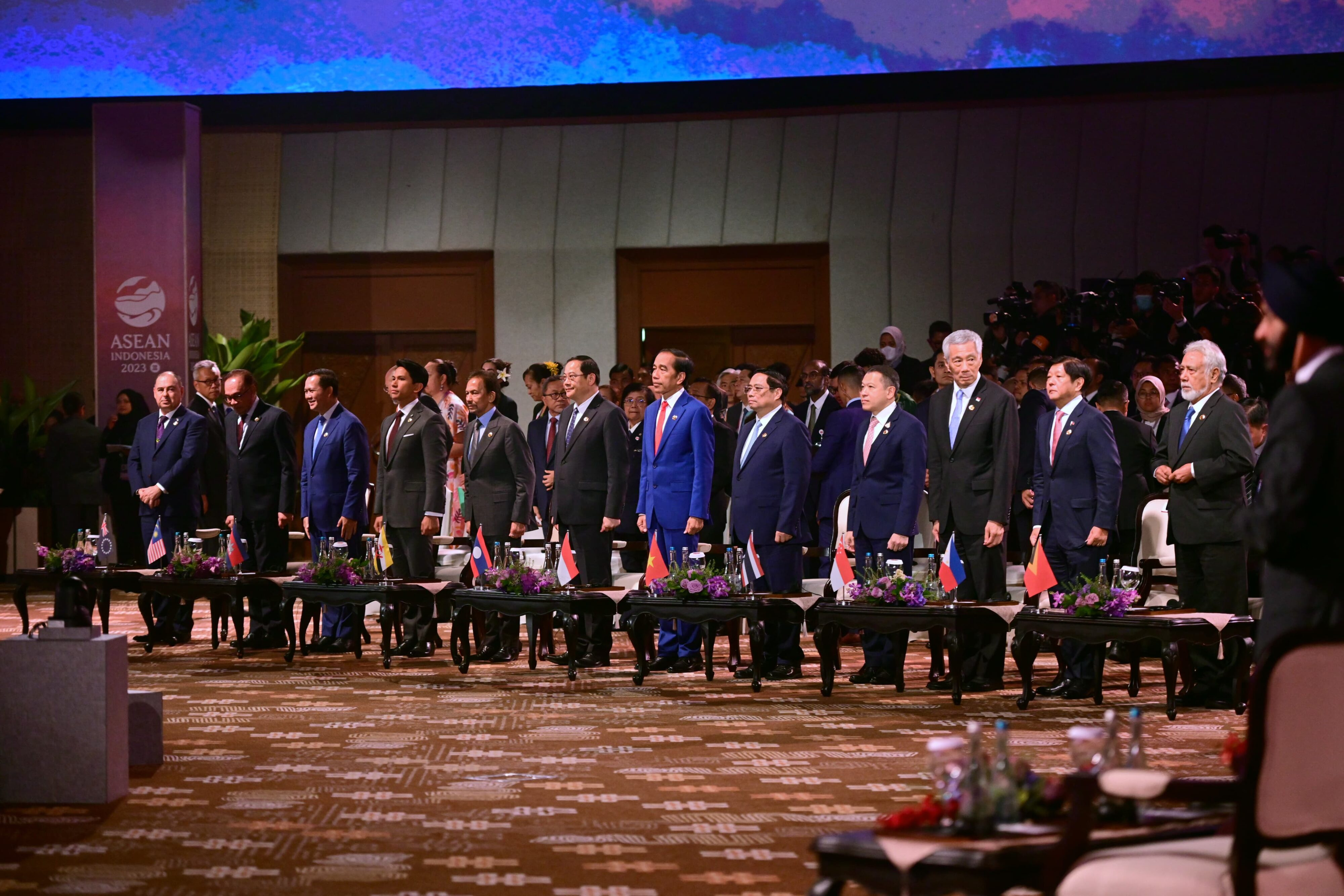
Leaders of ASEAN Countries, Cook Islands, and Timor-Leste at the 2023 ASEAN Summit. Singaporean PM, Lee Hsien Loong, briefly glances at East Timorese PM, Xanana Gusmao.

The 5th edition of the 'State of Southeast Asia' survey, published on February 9, 2023, by the ASEAN Studies Centre of the ISEAS-Yusof Ishak Institute in Singapore, reports to a conclusion that 61.5% of ASEAN respondents overwhelmingly support Timor-Leste's accession. To conduct this survey, the ISEAS-Yusof Ishak Institute surveyed a total of 1,308 people from ten Southeast Asian countries, including academics, researchers, representatives of the private and financial sectors, civil society representatives, non-governmental organisations, media professionals, government officials, and representatives of regional and international organisations. The survey was conducted over eight weeks, from November 14, 2022, to January 6, 2023. Participants answered questions on 54 topics related to regional geopolitics and the political, economic, and social situation in the region.

According to the poll, the strongest expression of support for Timor-Leste's accession came from Cambodia with 93.3%, and the Philippines with 69.7%. 67.8% from Indonesia supported their closest neighbour while nearly a quarter of Indonesia respondents (24.8%) were unsure over admitting Timor-Leste as a new member. The strongest opposition is from Myanmar at 48.7%, followed by Brunei at 45.0%, whereas Laos is most unsure of a new member joining at 38.3%. Although 26.4% of Singapore respondents remain unsure, only 11.1% expressed outright opposition. The lack of ASEAN consensus over Timor-Leste's application to join ASEAN has been frequently attributed to Singapore in the past.

Among respondents supportive of Timor-Leste's admission, 48.7% believe that a new member will enhance ASEAN's unity and centrality, while 39.9% are confident that Timor-Leste's membership will increase intra-regional trade and investment. Only 11.4% think that nothing will change in ASEAN. Vietnamese respondents are particularly optimistic, with 70.0% believing that Timor-Leste's membership will enhance ASEAN unity and centrality, significantly higher than the ASEAN average of 48.7%.

Among those opposing Timor-Leste's admission, 34.4% are concerned that ASEAN's economic integration will slow down due to Timor-Leste's membership, 29.8% believe that nothing will change in ASEAN, and 28.8% think that ASEAN's consensus-based decision-making process will be complicated by Timor-Leste's membership. Only 7.0% believe that this move will increase disunity among member states. In this category, 66.7% of Indonesian respondents foresee a slowdown in economic integration.

Of the participants who support Timor-Leste's admission, 48.7% believe that a new member will strengthen ASEAN's unity and centrality, while 9.9% are confident that Timor-Leste's accession will increase intra-regional trade and investment. Only 15.8% of respondents disagree with Timor-Leste joining ASEAN, 22.7% are not sure, and 11.4% believe that nothing will change in ASEAN.

== Impact of joining ==
=== Benefits to Timor-Leste ===
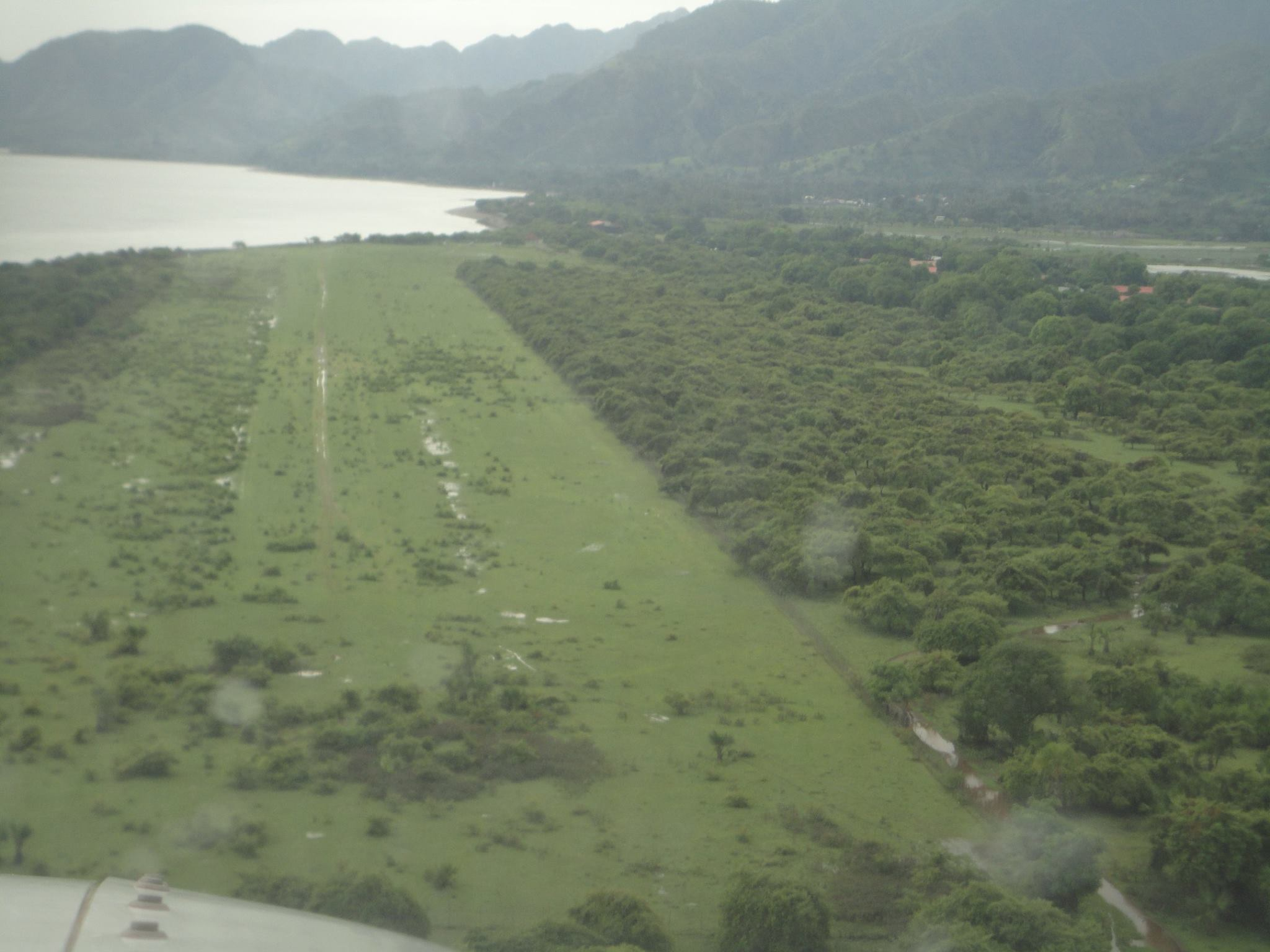
Oecusse Airport (then Palaban Airfield) in 2014

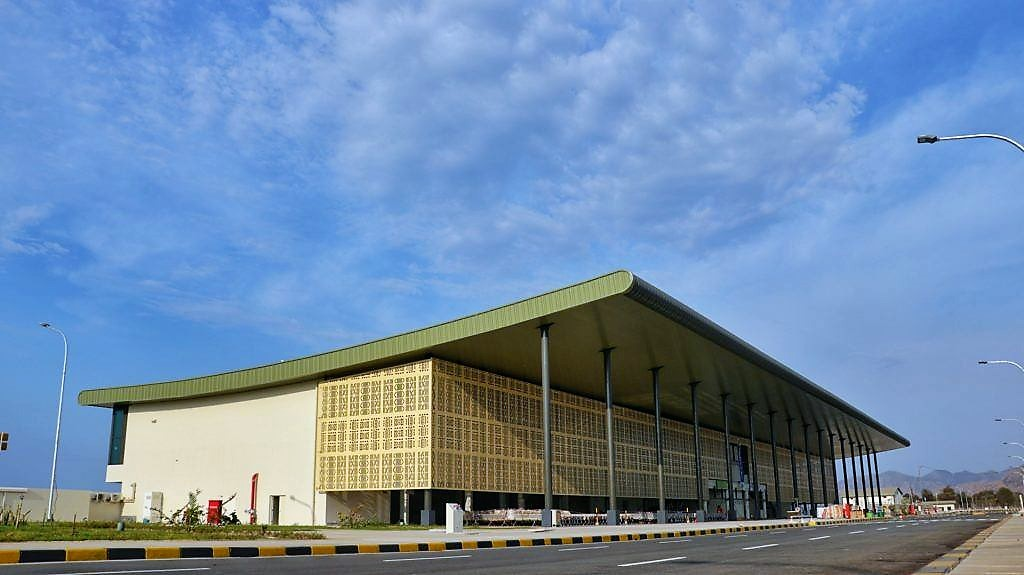
Oecusse Airport after being rebuilt by the Indonesian state-owned company Waskita Karya, funded by the government. Timor-Leste's ASEAN entry aims to boost confidence and attract more investments to the country

Timor-Leste viewed that integration into ASEAN would allow them a path for national reconciliation as it would give them access to the ASEAN market, and development funds such as the Initiative for ASEAN Integration that's aimed at narrowing the development gap between ASEAN members. It also would align themselves with other ASEAN members on global issues of common interest while seeking protection of itself under the ASEAN umbrella.

Joining ASEAN has the potential to further develop the agricultural sector in Timor-Leste.

Timor-Leste also holds a strategic position highly valued by both the United States and China for increasing global influence. It has access to crucial sea routes leading to Singapore, various Middle Eastern oil fields, and major global trade hubs in East Asia and the North American West Coast through the Australian Continent, including passages like the Malacca, Lombok, and the Sunda Straits.

=== Effects upon ASEAN ===
Timor-Leste's efforts to join ASEAN showed its desire for cohesion and its desire to contribute and integrate with the regional community. By accepting Timor-Leste, ASEAN reportedly promoted its role as a cooperation mechanism, as well as helping Timor-Leste's integration and development process take place more actively. ASEAN members would also gain access to Timor-Leste's sovereign funds with values estimated at $20 billion by 2020s for own economies.

As Timor-Leste has a geopolitical significance for China and United States, an exclusion of the country from ASEAN would turn the country towards China and potentially destabilising the regional cohesion.

== See also ==
- History of ASEAN
- Enlargement of ASEAN
  - Accession of Bangladesh to ASEAN
  - Accession of Papua New Guinea to ASEAN
  - Accession of Sri Lanka to ASEAN
