= Myanmar–Timor-Leste relations =

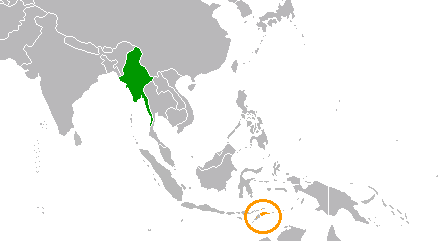

- Timor-Leste: Myanmar

Myanmar and Timor-Leste established diplomatic relations on 26 September 2006.

== History ==
=== 2021 ===
After the 2021 Myanmar coup d'etat and during the subsequent civil war in Myanmar, relations have significantly deteriorated between the two governments.

=== 2023 ===
In August 2023, the State Administration Council junta expelled the East Timorese ambassador in retaliation for the Timor-Leste government meeting with the National Unity Government of Myanmar (NUG). In December 2023, Timor-Leste President José Ramos-Horta called for Tatmadaw soldiers to defect and join the resistance, making Timor-Leste the only government to have openly expressed sympathies to anti-junta forces in Myanmar. Officials of the State Administration Council responded with outrage, running anti-Timor-Leste articles in state media referring to Ramos-Horta as a "thoughtless mouthpiece of the NUG". Additionally, "junta-backed nationalists" held a protest in Yangon against Ramos-Horta.

=== 2025 ===
On 2 July 2025, the State Administration Council of Myanmar has officially notified Malaysia, the 2025 ASEAN chair, of its opposition to Timor-Leste joining the bloc in October 2025, citing internal interference. Timor-Leste has reportedly supported the opposing democratic forces in the onging civil war.

=== 2026 ===
After the Chin Human Rights Organisation met Ramos-Horta in Timor-Leste on 14 January 2026, the State Security and Peace Commission junta accused the CHRO of violating the ASEAN Charter. The CHRO intends to sue the junta for war crimes under Timor-Leste's legal jurisdiction. The Foreign Ministry of Myanmar stated that the meeting constitutes as "blatant interference" and filed a criminal complaint against Timor-Leste. Later, on 16 February, Myanmar ordered the expulsion of the Timor-Leste's top representative after the CHRO opened its case against the junta war crimes and crimes against humanity.
