= Philippines–Timor-Leste relations =

- Timor-Leste: Philippines

Diplomatic mission
- Embassy of Timor-Leste, Pasig: Embassy of the Philippines, Dili

Envoy
- Ambassador Marciano Octavio Garcia Da Silva: Ambassador Mary Anne A. Padua

Philippines–Timor-Leste relations refer to foreign relations between the Philippines and Timor-Leste (East Timor). The Philippines was actively involved in the United Nations peacekeeping forces in Timor-Leste during its move towards independence. When several nations recognized National University of Timor-Leste's sovereignty, the Philippines began official diplomatic relations between the two governments with the establishment of an embassy in Dili and East Timor established its embassy in Pasig.

The pre-colonial kingdoms of the Philippines and East Timor had relations with each other even before the Iberian powers colonized these areas. During Magellan's Circumnavigation of the World, when his ships anchored at East Timor, they found the Lucoes (people of Luzon, Philippines) settling in East Timor and trading Philippine gold for East Timorese Sandalwood.

Since then, the Philippines has maintained strong ties with the newly born independent country, sending peacekeepers to the country since 1999 amid its struggle for independence from Indonesia. Both nations were conquered by the Iberian powers, mainly by Spain and Portugal, in the 16th century and later by emerging powers, mainly by the United States and Indonesia, in the 20th century.

== Relations ==
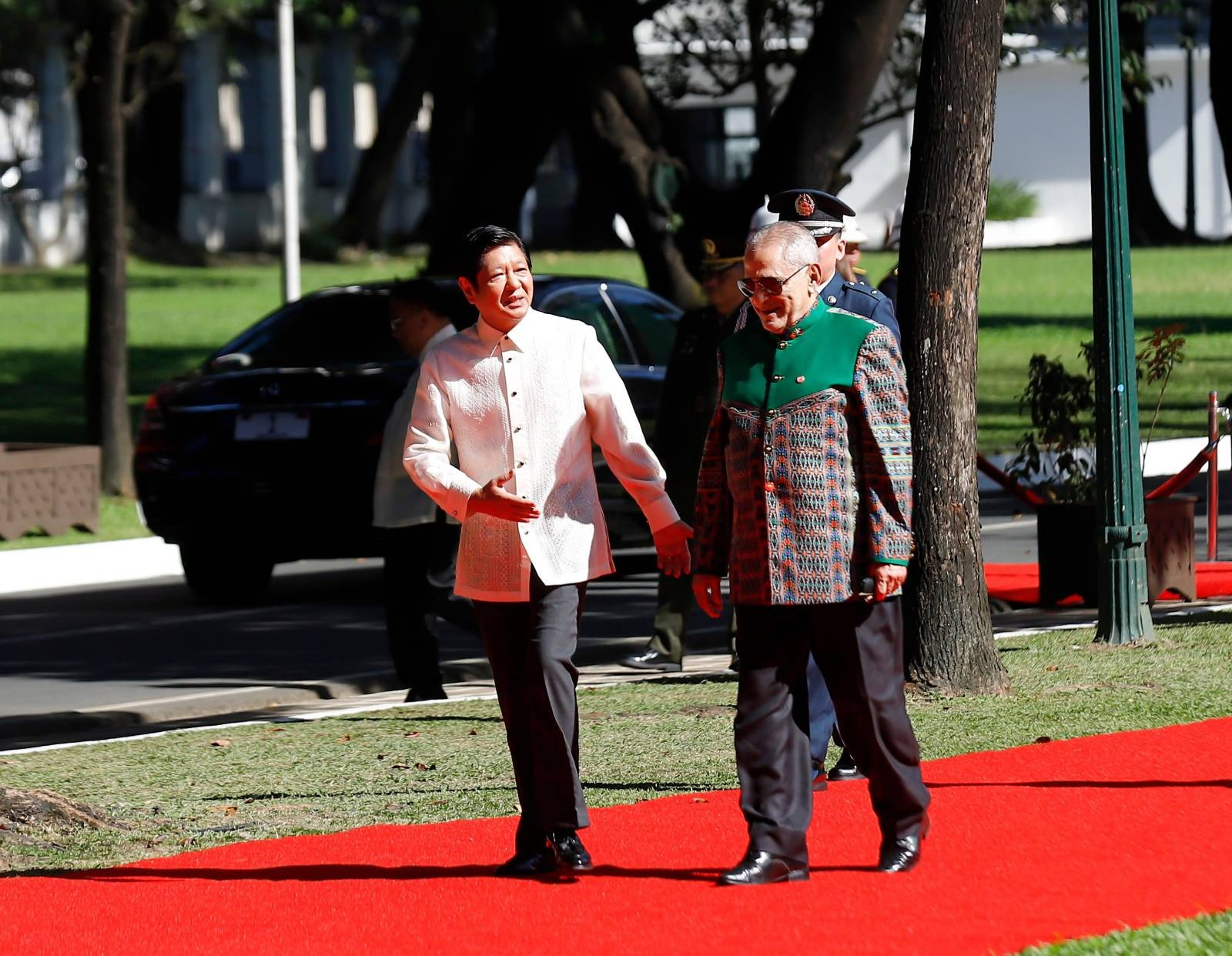
Presidents Bongbong Marcos and José Ramos-Horta during the latter's state visit to Malacañang Palace in 2023.

In 2008, Timor-Leste and the Philippines signed three agreements to boost cooperation on marine and fisheries, education, and foreign service training. Philippine President Gloria Macapagal Arroyo and East Timorese President José Ramos-Horta witnessed the signing of the pacts during their bilateral meeting. The Philippines has pledged increased commerce and trade with Timor-Leste and has also sought to cultivate cultural and educational exchanges. In 2010, when newly elected President Benigno Aquino III sworn into office, Timor-Leste President José Ramos-Horta attended his inauguration (the only foreign head of state to do so) and expected stronger trade and diplomatic relations with the Philippines under his administration. Timor-Leste Foreign Minister Jose Luis Guterres held bilateral talks with his counterpart Albert del Rosario and met with President Benigno Aquino III during his stay in Manila.

The Philippines, one of two predominantly Catholic countries in Asia, has been the strongest voice in ASEAN for Timor-Leste's ASEAN membership bid. The majority of Filipinos perceive a favorable response to East Timorese and are supportive of Timor-Leste's accession to ASEAN since its application.

=== Arnie Teves ===
==== Background ====
Arnie Teves, a former Philippine congressman from Negros Oriental's 3rd district, was accused of orchestrating the March 2023 killing of Governor Roel Degamo and others. He was expelled from the Philippine House in August 2023 for evading court orders. Teves denied the charges, claiming political persecution. In late 2023, he left the Philippines and flew to Timor-Leste. Philippine authorities sought his extradition on multiple murder charges (including Degamo's assassination). Teves applied for political asylum in Timor-Leste in 2023, but Timorese immigration authorities ultimately rejected his request (a decision he appealed).

In March 2024, Timor-Leste's police arrested Teves at a golf driving range in Dili. He was detained but later released; reports indicate that by May 2025, he remained at liberty in Dili. In May 2025, immigration authorities arrested Teves again in a late-night operation at his Dili residence (without a warrant, according to his lawyer). He was held in the Interior Ministry's Immigration Service office pending legal proceedings. The Timorese government then decided (by administrative order) to deport him to the Philippines.

On May 29, 2025, Timor-Leste's Ministry of the Interior carried out the deportation. An official Timor-Leste press release confirmed that "Filipino citizen Arnolfo Teves Jr. was deported today, May 29, 2025, by administrative decision of the Ministry of the Interior, and is already in the custody of the competent authorities of the Republic of the Philippines." The release explained that Teves "was in the country without a valid visa, without legal authorization to remain, and with a passport that his country of origin had revoked," and that his continued stay "poses risks to public order and national security." The deportation order includes a ten-year ban on Teves re-entering Timor-Leste. Timor-Leste explicitly warned that harboring a fugitive "undermines the integrity of our borders" and "our shared efforts to combat transnational crime," especially as the country prepared for full ASEAN membership.

Philippine authorities met the deported Teves upon arrival (via a Philippine Air Force aircraft) on May 29, 2025. A Department of Justice (DOJ) press release and news reports noted that an inter-agency Philippine team (DOJ, Bureau of Immigration, NBI) was mobilized to coordinate with Timorese counterparts and ensure Teves's safe, lawful repatriation. On arrival in Manila, Teves was placed under arrest to face the charges against him.

==== Impact on bilateral relations ====
===== Legal and security cooperation =====
Teves's presence in Timor-Leste became a bilateral issue. Philippine officials repeatedly requested his return, while Timorese authorities initially treated him under migration law rather than as an extradition case. In March 2025, the Timor-Leste Court of Appeal rejected the Philippines' extradition request (citing a constitutional ban on extraditing individuals at risk of inhuman treatment). The Philippine DOJ publicly expressed disappointment, calling the reversal "peculiar and legally improbable," and reiterated the need for cooperation "in the pursuit of justice." Philippine officials warned that allowing Teves to evade trial would undermine the rule of law.

Timor-Leste emphasized that Teves's extended stay was "unacceptable" and a "disruptive factor in bilateral relations." President José Ramos-Horta had warned earlier that Timor-Leste should not become a "paradise" for fugitives; he said under national law there was "no possibility" Teves could remain once legal appeals were exhausted. Timorese statements pointed to ASEAN-related responsibilities: with Timor-Leste set to join ASEAN in October 2025, its leaders stressed the need for regional legal cooperation. One government statement noted that the impending ASEAN accession "reinforces the responsibility of the Timorese state to actively collaborate with its regional partners in upholding justice, legality, and stability in the region."

Once the deportation decision was announced, both governments publicly framed it as a cooperative success. The Philippine DOJ lauded the move as an "act of regional responsibility," praising Timor-Leste's commitment to justice, the rule of law, and regional stability. The Philippines noted that the deportation was accomplished through "close collaboration" between Timorese and Philippine authorities. President Bongbong Marcos publicly thanked Timor-Leste's leaders; in a televised statement, he said it "is now time for Mr. Teves to face justice" in the Philippines, and credited President Ramos-Horta and Prime Minister Xanana Gusmão for facilitating the outcome. Marcos declared, "We want to assure the public that lawlessness will not go unpunished." On the Timorese side, the government's press release reiterated that Timor-Leste would not serve as a haven from international justice and reaffirmed its commitment to ASEAN norms of cooperation.

Throughout the affair, both nations engaged through legal channels. The Philippines submitted multiple requests (through Interpol and formal notes) for Teves's surrender. Timor-Leste's Court of Appeal initially granted and then, later in March 2025, denied those extradition requests. Simultaneously, Timorese officials handled Teves's immigration status. Ultimately, Timor-Leste invoked its domestic immigration and asylum laws to justify deportation. In so doing, Timor-Leste laid out human-rights conditions: its official statements noted that Teves could not face the death penalty (which the Philippines has abolished) and must be guaranteed fair trial and humane treatment. Philippine law enforcement and justice departments worked closely with their Timorese counterparts; upon receipt of Timorese assurances and extradition papers, a joint team of Philippine DOJ, immigration, and NBI officials accompanied the transfer and took custody of Teves.

For the most part, the case led to intensified legal cooperation rather than rupture. Philippine Justice Secretary Jesus Crispin Remulla and other officials publicly welcomed Timor-Leste's decision, noting it paved the way to end the "two-year" saga and bring Teves to face charges. Timor-Leste's stance—that Teves's unauthorized presence threatened public order—allowed diplomatic channels to resolve the issue. Both governments issued statements emphasizing their shared interest in the rule of law. Timor-Leste's formal press release reaffirmed respect for international legal norms and regional security, while Philippine statements highlighted ASEAN solidarity and mutual legal assistance.

===== Public and political discourse =====
In the Philippines, Teves's case was widely covered in the media and political arena. Philippine authorities and Degamo's family demanded accountability; Governor Degamo's widow, Janice Degamo, who was elected as the House representative of Negros Oriental's 3rd district (Teves's former seat), hailed the deportation and said it vindicated concerns that Teves's presence "compromises regional peace, security and the rule of law." President Marcos and Justice officials used the case to underscore that "political paralysis" would not excuse fugitive politicians – Marcos noted Timor-Leste's action shows that "lawlessness will not go unpunished."

Teves's supporters, by contrast, criticized the process. His lawyer, Ferdinand Topacio, and family described his May 2025 arrest in Dili as irregular; they filed a writ of habeas corpus in a Timorese court, claiming the seizure was unlawful. Teves himself has consistently denied wrongdoing, refusing to return voluntarily and alleging political persecution. These claims featured in the Philippine press but were not reflected in any official Timorese justification. In Timor-Leste public discourse, officials uniformly treated the case as one of enforcing immigration and security laws; there was little sign of domestic opposition to the deportation. Instead, Timorese leaders stressed that helping to return Teves bolstered Timor-Leste's international reputation ahead of ASEAN membership.

The Teves affair briefly created friction between the Philippines and Timor-Leste, as noted by Philippine officials, but ultimately was resolved through legal and diplomatic channels. By late May 2025, both sides portrayed the outcome as a reaffirmation of cooperation: Timor-Leste underscored its commitment to regional norms, and the Philippines thanked Timorese partners for their assistance.

== Military aid ==
The Philippines offered to help the Timor-Leste Defence Force to improve its capability through education and training with the help of the Armed Forces of the Philippines (AFP). AFP Spokesperson Col. Arnulfo Marcelo Burgos mentioned:

"Since East Timor is a very young nation with a newly-organized defense force, the Armed Forces of the Philippines offered its assistance in building their military capability".
