= Enlargement of ASEAN =

Process of expanding the Association of Southeast Asian Nations

The territories of the member states of ASEAN (ASA and Maphilindo pre-1967), animated in order of accession. Observer states in dark grey.

The enlargement of the Association of Southeast Asian Nations is the process of expanding the Association of Southeast Asian Nations (ASEAN) through the accession of new member states. This process began with ASEAN's five original members, who founded the association through the signing of the Bangkok Declaration in 1967. Since then, ASEAN's membership has grown to eleven, most recently with the accession of Cambodia in 1999 and Timor-Leste in 2025.

Currently, two states are seeking accession to ASEAN: Papua New Guinea and Bangladesh.

== Criteria ==
The ASEAN Charter defines the following criteria for membership:

- The state must be geographically located in Southeast Asia.
- The state must be recognised by all ASEAN member states.
- The state must agree to be bound by the ASEAN Charter.
- The state must be able and willing to carry out the obligations of membership.

One of the obligations of membership is that a prospective member must agree to subscribe or accede to all the treaties, declarations and agreements in ASEAN, starting with those outlined in the Bangkok Declaration of 8 August 1967 and those elaborated and developed in various subsequent treaties, declarations and agreements of ASEAN. One common concern that must be addressed through negotiations is the ability of a prospective member to participate in ASEAN Free Trade Area and all other economic co-operation arrangements. One important means of orientation for a prospective member is its attendance at ASEAN meetings and participation in co-operation projects. Other obligations of membership are that a state must maintain embassies in all current member countries of the bloc, and the country must attend all ministerial meetings and summits.

The Bangkok Declaration lays down no conditions for membership other than location in Southeast Asia and the usual principles of inter-state relations. ASEAN has no membership criteria related to the character of government, ideological system and orientation, economic policy, or level of development. If there were such criteria for membership, a regional association would not be possible in Southeast Asia, given its diversity.

ASEAN senior officials agreed in 1983 that observer status should be granted only to potential members of ASEAN who satisfy the criteria set for ASEAN membership.

=== Criteria for ASEAN Regional Forum ===
██ ASEAN full members ██ ASEAN observers ██ ASEAN Plus Three ███ East Asia Summit █████ ASEAN Regional Forum

ASEAN Regional Forum (ARF), the multilateral dialogue among Asia Pacific countries is aimed for fostering dialogue and consultation, also promoting confidence-building and preventive diplomacy throughout the region. The membership criteria for ARF, as well as other Dialogue Partners, were outlined during the second ARF in 1996, in Jakarta, Indonesia. ARF ministers adopted the criteria that ARF participants must be sovereign states, which, at China's behest, was evidently meant to exclude Taiwan. They must "abide by and respect fully the decisions and statements already made by the ARF". The criteria stress that ASEAN members "automatically" take part in the ARF.

== Historical enlargements ==
=== Founding members ===
ASEAN was established on 8 August 1967, when foreign ministers of five countries – Indonesia, Malaysia, the Philippines, Singapore, and Thailand – met at the Thai Department of Foreign Affairs building in Bangkok and signed the ASEAN Declaration, more commonly known as the Bangkok Declaration. The five foreign ministers: Adam Malik of Indonesia, Narciso Ramos of the Philippines, Abdul Razak of Malaysia, S. Rajaratnam of Singapore, and Thanat Khoman of Thailand are considered as the organisation's Founding Fathers.

=== Continued expansion ===
During the 3rd ASEAN Ministerial Meeting (AMM) held on 16–17 December 1969 at Cameron Highlands, Malaysia invited South Vietnam and the Kingdom of Laos to become an observer state of the new organization. South Vietnam, eyeing for full membership, has since sent participants to the ASEAN Ministerial Meetings from 1969, 1971, and 1972 as an observer until they were taken over by North Vietnam under the fall of Saigon.

At the 5th ASEAN Ministerial Meeting (AMM) at Singapore, Lon Nol's Khmer Republic became an observer at ASEAN under the invitation of Lee Kuan Yew. ASEAN brought Indochinese states into its Ministerial Meetings as observers while discussing ZOPFAN and regional security. Khmer's observer role effectively ended with the fall of Phnom Penh in 1975.

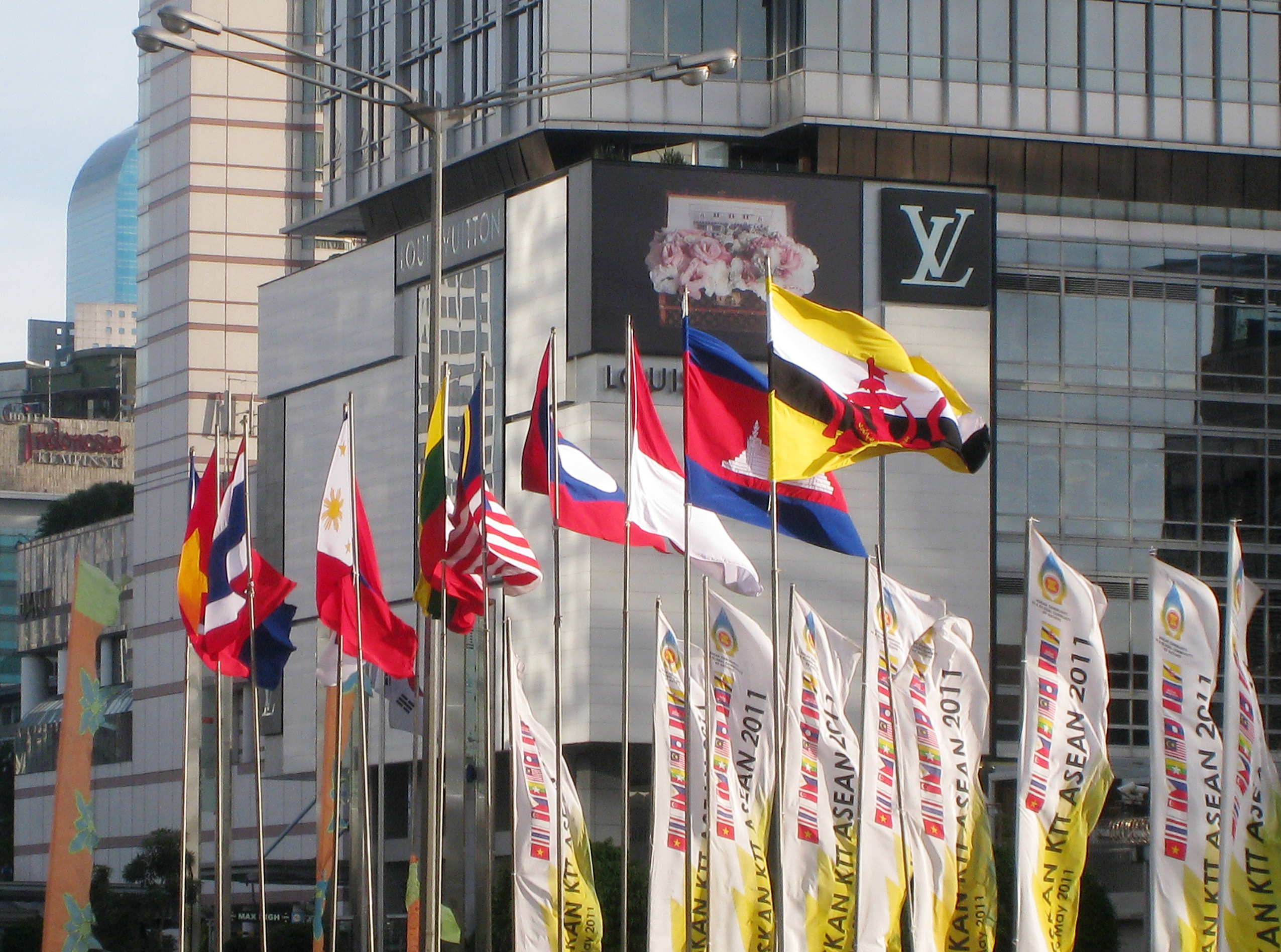
The flags of ten ASEAN members (2011); Timor-Leste, which joined later in 2025, is not present

In 1976, the Melanesian state of Papua New Guinea was accorded observer status. The bloc then grew when Brunei Darussalam became the sixth member after it joined on 8 January 1984, barely a week after the country became independent on 1 January.

In 1992, at the 4th ASEAN Summit and the subsequent 25th AMM, Vietnam joined the Treaty of Amity and Cooperation and became an ASEAN observer, then from 1993 it began regular participation in ASEAN foreign ministers’ meetings and sectoral cooperation. Vietnam would later became the seventh full member on 28 July 1995.

==== Laos, Myanmar, and Cambodia ====
The next three members of ASEAN began their application in joining the bloc in the 1990s.

Laos became an ASEAN observer at the 25th ASEAN Ministerial Meeting (AMM) in Manila, Philippines, in July 1992. At the 28th AMM in Bandar Seri Begawan, Brunei, the Lao foreign minister announced that he wished to see Laos join ASEAN in 1997, stated in a letter of application for membership dated 15 March 1996.

Cambodia was accorded observer status at the 28th AMM in July 1995. The Cambodian foreign minister applied for membership in a letter dated 23 March 1996. Like Laos, Cambodia also wished to join ASEAN in 1997.

The foreign minister of Myanmar attended the 27th and 28th AMM as a guest of the host governments. During the 28th meeting, Myanmar acceded to the Treaty of Amity and Cooperation in Southeast Asia and applied for observer status.

The heads of government of Myanmar, Laos and Cambodia met with those of ASEAN during the Fifth ASEAN Summit in Bangkok on 15 December 1995. The representative of Myanmar expressed hope that his country would be accorded observer status at the 29th AMM in 1996.

The ASEAN Security Committee (ASC) established a working group, chaired by ASEAN Deputy Secretary-General Mr. Mahadi Haji Wasli, to look into all issues on the potential membership of Cambodia and Laos. On 17 July 1996, the working group held consultations with the director-general of the ASEAN Department of Laos in Jakarta.

At the 29th AMM, Myanmar was accorded observer status, and participated in the ARF for the first time. On 12 August 1996, Myanmar submitted application for membership in ASEAN, with hopes for joining by 1997 along with Cambodia and Laos. The ASC then extended the mandate of the Working Group on the Membership of Cambodia and Laos to also include the membership of Myanmar.

Laos and Myanmar became members of ASEAN on 23 July 1997. Cambodia's membership was deferred due to the country's internal political struggle; following the stabilisation of its government, Cambodia joined on 30 April 1999.

In addition to the growth in membership, the bloc experienced a drive for further integration in the 1990s. In 1990, Malaysia proposed the creation of an East Asia Economic Caucus composing the then-members of ASEAN and the People's Republic of China, Japan, and South Korea, with the intention of counterbalancing the growing influence of the United States in the Asia-Pacific Economic Cooperation (APEC) and in the Asian region as a whole. This proposal failed, however, due to heavy opposition from the United States and Japan. Despite this failure, member states continued to work for further integration and ASEAN Plus Three was created in 1997.

In 1992, the Common Effective Preferential Tariff (CEPT) scheme was signed as a schedule for phasing tariffs and as a goal to increase the "region's competitive advantage as a production base geared for the world market". This law acted as the framework for the ASEAN Free Trade Area. After the 1997 Asian financial crisis, a revival of the Malaysian proposal was established in Chiang Mai, known as the Chiang Mai Initiative, which calls for better integration between the economies of ASEAN and the ASEAN Plus Three countries.

==== Timor-Leste ====
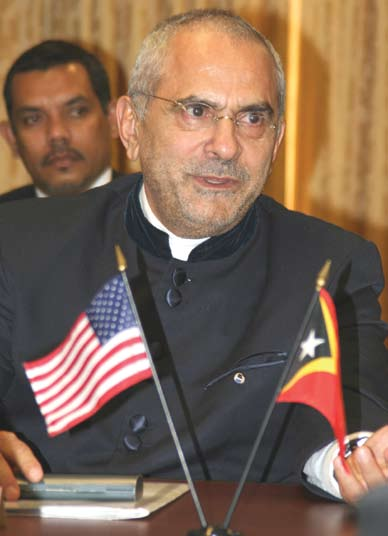
José Ramos-Horta had hoped that Timor-Leste could join ASEAN before 2012; the country eventually joined in 2025.

In March 2011 Timor-Leste submitted a membership application to ASEAN, a move which was supported by Indonesia, its former colonialist turned partner-ally, and the Philippines, its only Catholic ally in Asia.

Timor-Leste regained its independence in 2002, and from the following year took part in the Southeast Asian Games, a multi-sport event associated with ASEAN. In 2005, the country became the 25th to join the ARF. The biggest struggle toward joining ASEAN was for the young and war-torn country to maintain embassies in all ten ASEAN member countries. Timorese President José Ramos-Horta hoped to gain membership before 2012.

Lack of consensus prevented ASEAN from arriving at decisions on observer status for Timor-Leste and its accession to the Treaty of Amity and Cooperation. The treaty makes clear distinctions between the rights of regional and non-regional signatories, but whether Timor-Leste a part of the region is debatable.

Singaporean Prime Minister Lee Hsien Loong objected in late 2011 to Timor-Leste's membership, due to his desire to achieve economic integration by 2015, which the relatively less-developed Timor-Leste would make difficult. Some member states are concerned that, having experienced the entry of four relatively underdeveloped members, ASEAN would be admitting an even poorer one. Although ASEAN has no membership criteria regarding political ideology, some ASEAN countries had difficulties with Timor-Leste's eventual membership.

In 2015, Timor-Leste's ambassador to Malaysia said the country was ready to join ASEAN, having fulfilled the two major requirements of being located in the region and having opened embassies in ASEAN member countries. In 2016, Indonesia announced that Timor-Leste's membership bid could be realised in 2017, since the feasibility studies conducted by both countries on Timor-Leste's stability, security, economy, and culture would be finished by the end of 2016. The Philippines, a close ally of Timor-Leste, would be the ARF host for 2017.

In November 2022, following the 40th and 41st ASEAN Summit in Phnom Penh, the organisation issued a statement announcing that it had agreed "in principle" to East Timor's membership, granted East Timor observer status at high-level meetings and that a roadmap to full membership would be submitted at the 2023 summit. At the 42nd ASEAN Summit in Labuan Bajo in May 2023 the roadmap for Timor Leste's accession was adopted.

During the 46th ASEAN Summit, Malaysian Prime Minister Anwar Ibrahim suggested that Timor-Leste could officially join ASEAN during the following summit scheduled in October 2025. On 25 October 2025, Timor-Leste deposited its instruments of accession to ASEAN. Malaysian foreign minister Datuk Seri Mohamad Hasan stated “your presence will enrich Asean’s collective identity. Not only in demography, but politically, culturally, and economically”. On 26 October 2025, Timor-Leste officially joined ASEAN with the signing of the Declaration on the Admission of Timor-Leste into ASEAN.

== Future enlargement ==
Member states Candidates: Papua New Guinea Potential candidates for observer status: Bangladesh and Fiji

=== Papua New Guinea ===
Papua New Guinea (PNG) has been an observer of the regional bloc since 1976, earlier than any other non-original member of ASEAN. Its leaders have been pushing for full membership since at least the 1980s. During the 29th AMM in 1996, PNG Foreign Minister Kilroy Genia proposed that Papua New Guinea be accorded permanent associate membership with ASEAN. PNG Prime Minister Michael Somare stated during his visit to the Philippines in 2009 that his country was considering applying for full membership. In March 2012, Indonesian President Susilo Bambang Yudhoyono expressed his support for PNG membership in ASEAN. In June 2013 PNG Foreign Minister Rimbink Pato reiterated that the country was "very interested" in joining ASEAN. During 46th ASEAN summit in Malaysia, Indonesian President Prabowo Subianto proposed for PNG's inclusion to ASEAN.

An obstacle to PNG's admission to ASEAN has been its geographical location. Although located no farther away from ASEAN's Jakarta headquarters than northern Myanmar, PNG is usually considered to be outside Southeast Asia, according to the Wallace line which delineates Southeast Asia from Australasia, and thus ineligible for membership. When the country was granted the observer status in 1976, it was acknowledged that PNG shares the same political and economic region with ASEAN's member states, and was connected geographically, because the country forms half of the island of New Guinea, with the other half consisting of Indonesia's provinces of Papua and West Papua.

In 2015, PNG appointed a special envoy to deal with matters related to ASEAN, reflecting its determination to expedite becoming a full member of the ASEAN bloc. PNG was also taking the necessary steps to prepare itself for integration.

== Countries interested in joining ==
A number of countries had expressed an interest in becoming part of ASEAN despite being outside the geographical limits of Southeast Asia.

=== Bangladesh ===
In the 1970s, President Ziaur Rahman of Bangladesh sought to join ASEAN as part of an effort to legitimise his administration following a coup d’état that had overthrown the previous democratic government. However, the request was rejected by ASEAN on the grounds of maintaining organisational cohesion, particularly due to concerns over Bangladesh’s governance structure at the time. In response, Zia proposed the formation of a separate South Asian regional organisation in 1980, an initiative that ultimately led to the establishment of the South Asian Association for Regional Cooperation (SAARC) in 1985. Bangladesh incrementally increased its engagement with ASEAN mechanisms in the 2000s, as in July 2006, Bangladesh was admitted to the ASEAN Regional Forum (ARF), ASEAN’s security dialogue platform, as its 26th participating country. The following year, Bangladesh acceded to ASEAN’s foundational Treaty of Amity and Cooperation (TAC) on August 1, 2007.

Laos announced in 2011 that it would support Bangladesh in obtaining ASEAN observer status. The Bangladeshi government also took concrete diplomatic steps in 2013–2014 as it appointed its first dedicated Ambassador to ASEAN. Ambassador Md. Nazmul Quaunine (also Bangladesh’s envoy to Indonesia) presented credentials to the ASEAN Secretary-General in May 2014, becoming Bangladesh’s first ambassador accredited to ASEAN. That same year, the ASEAN Dhaka Committee was established as a grouping of ASEAN ambassadors in Bangladesh’s capital to promote economic and cultural links.

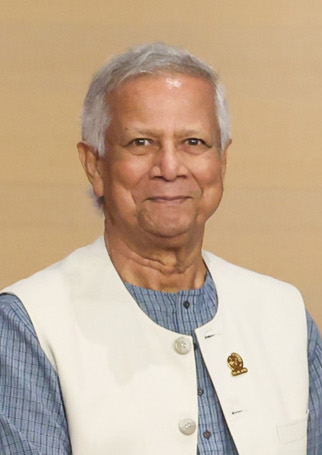
Muhammad Yunus believes that joining ASEAN was a strategic end goal for Bangladesh

In the mid-2020s, Bangladesh’s ambition to accede to ASEAN gained new momentum as a political transition in Dhaka, in the aftermath of the July Revolution, saw an interim government openly prioritise an ASEAN bid. By 2024, Bangladesh was actively campaigning for membership at high levels. In November 2024, Chief Adviser Prof. Muhammad Yunus, the interim and caretaker government of Bangladesh, publicly stated that joining ASEAN was a strategic goal for Bangladesh. Yunus had, at first, conveyed the idea to Malaysian High Commissioner Hasnah Mohammed Hashim during a visit at the State Guest House Jamuna. Hasnah would later convey the proposal to relevant authorities in Malaysia.

In early April 2025, Prof. Yunus attended the BIMSTEC summit in Bangkok, Thailand, and used the opportunity to court Thai support. At a breakfast with Thai political and business leaders, he declared that Bangladesh’s “ultimate goal is to join ASEAN as a full member,” after first becoming a sectoral dialogue partner. He sought backing from top figures in Thailand, including former Prime Minister Abhisit Vejjajiva, and other ASEAN states like Indonesia and Malaysia for Bangladesh’s membership aspirations. A few weeks later, on May 25, 2025, Yunus met former Malaysian Prime Minister Mahathir Mohamad on the sidelines of the Nikkei “Future of Asia” conference in Tokyo. He urged Mahathir to help Bangladesh in its quest for ASEAN membership, emphasising that Dhaka “needed Malaysia’s support” as ASEAN chair to advance the bid. Though supportive of Bangladesh's observer status, Mahathir held some concerns on Bangladesh's process, notably on the problems of geography as he believes that Bangladesh was "geographically too far from what is currently defined as Southeast Asia."

Nevertheless, these overtures elicited significant responses from Southeast Asian officials by mid-2025. Notably, Malaysia emerged as an outspoken supporter of Bangladesh’s potential membership. In 2025, under the chairmanship of ASEAN, Malaysia had backed Bangladesh's bid in gaining observer status. Malaysian Deputy Minister Liew Chin Tong once urged ASEAN to seriously consider Bangladesh’s inclusion, citing Bangladesh’s growing economic strength and strategic relevance. High commissioner of Bangladesh to Malaysia, M. Shameem Ahsan, believes that Bangladesh's desire to becoming part of ASEAN's sectoral dialogue partner would be a good first step to full membership.

=== Fiji ===
Fiji has expressed an interest in being granted observer status at ASEAN. In 2011, the President of Indonesia, Susilo Bambang Yudhoyono, reportedly advised the Prime Minister of Fiji, Commodore Frank Bainimarama, that he would advocate for consideration of this request during Indonesia's chairmanship of ASEAN.

In 2024, Fiji's foreign policy white paper seemingly revives the idea. The paper writes the government's continued commitment to seek observer status with ASEAN.

=== Sri Lanka ===
Sri Lanka was initially invited by Malaysia to join ASEAN as a founding member on 8 August 1967, however the country did not proceed as ASEAN was pro-Western and Sri Lanka was then pursuing a policy of non-alignment. There was also objection from Singapore over concerns of domestic instability from tensions between the two main ethnic groups of Sri Lanka. Interest from within the country later became evident and it attempted to join ASEAN by 1981. In both cases, Malaysia has been a supporter of Sri Lanka's accession into ASEAN, while Singapore opposes it. In 2007, Sri Lanka was among the 27 participants in the ARF.

In 2018, there were explicit talk from the Sri Lankan leadership about moving toward observer status as a political goal. Ranil Wickremesinghe, then acting president of Sri Lanka, held some interest in obtaining observer status as a way to advance the Sri Lankan economy.

On 15 March 2025, the Minister of Foreign Affairs Vijitha Herath announced that Sri Lanka applied for ASEAN Sectoral Dialogue Partnership.

== Other countries ==
=== Australia ===
In February 2018, independent think tank Australian Strategic Policy Institute recommended that Australia seek ASEAN membership by 2024. In 2016, former Australian prime minister Paul Keating suggested that Australia join ASEAN. During a 2018 interview with Fairfax Media, Indonesian President Joko Widodo stated that Australia should join the organisation. In March 2024, Philippine President Bongbong Marcos also expressed openness for Australia to join.

=== Brazil ===
In October 2025, Brazil President Lula da Silva said that Brazil is working to become a full member of the Association of Southeast Asian Nations (ASEAN). He is traveling in the region and seeking closer political ties with the countries and the possibility of expanding Brazilian trade to reach a market of 680 million people.

=== Mongolia ===
In May 2017, Philippine President Rodrigo Duterte said that Mongolia had expressed a desire to join ASEAN. He then stated that he would push for the other member states to include them.

=== New Zealand ===
In February 2018, independent think tank Australian Strategic Policy Institute recommended that Australia and New Zealand should join ASEAN by 2024.

=== Palau ===
In June 2019, a researcher at Johns Hopkins University recommended that Palau has the potential to meaningfully participate in ASEAN. He then argued that the United States should try to persuade Thailand to push for observer status for Palau during its chairmanship of ASEAN. In 2018, Palau and the Philippines began re-connecting their economic and diplomatic relations. As a way to enhance and expand cooperation, the country has expressed its intent to back Palau if ever it wishes to join ASEAN, as Palau also has Southeast Asian ethnic origins.

=== Serbia ===
In November 2022, Serbian Prime Minister Ana Brnabić said that Serbia would seek to cooperate with ASEAN. She also said that Serbia will have Singaporean support for this. In July 2023, Serbia's accession request to the Treaty of Amity and Cooperation in Southeast Asia was unanimously approved. In September 2024, the Serbian parliament formally requested associate membership in the ASEAN Inter-Parliamentary Assembly (AIPA), citing historical cooperation in the Non-Aligned Movement.

=== Turkey ===
In May 2017, Philippine President Rodrigo Duterte said that Turkey had expressed a desire to join ASEAN. He then stated that he would push for the other member states to include them.
