= Papua New Guinea–Philippines relations =

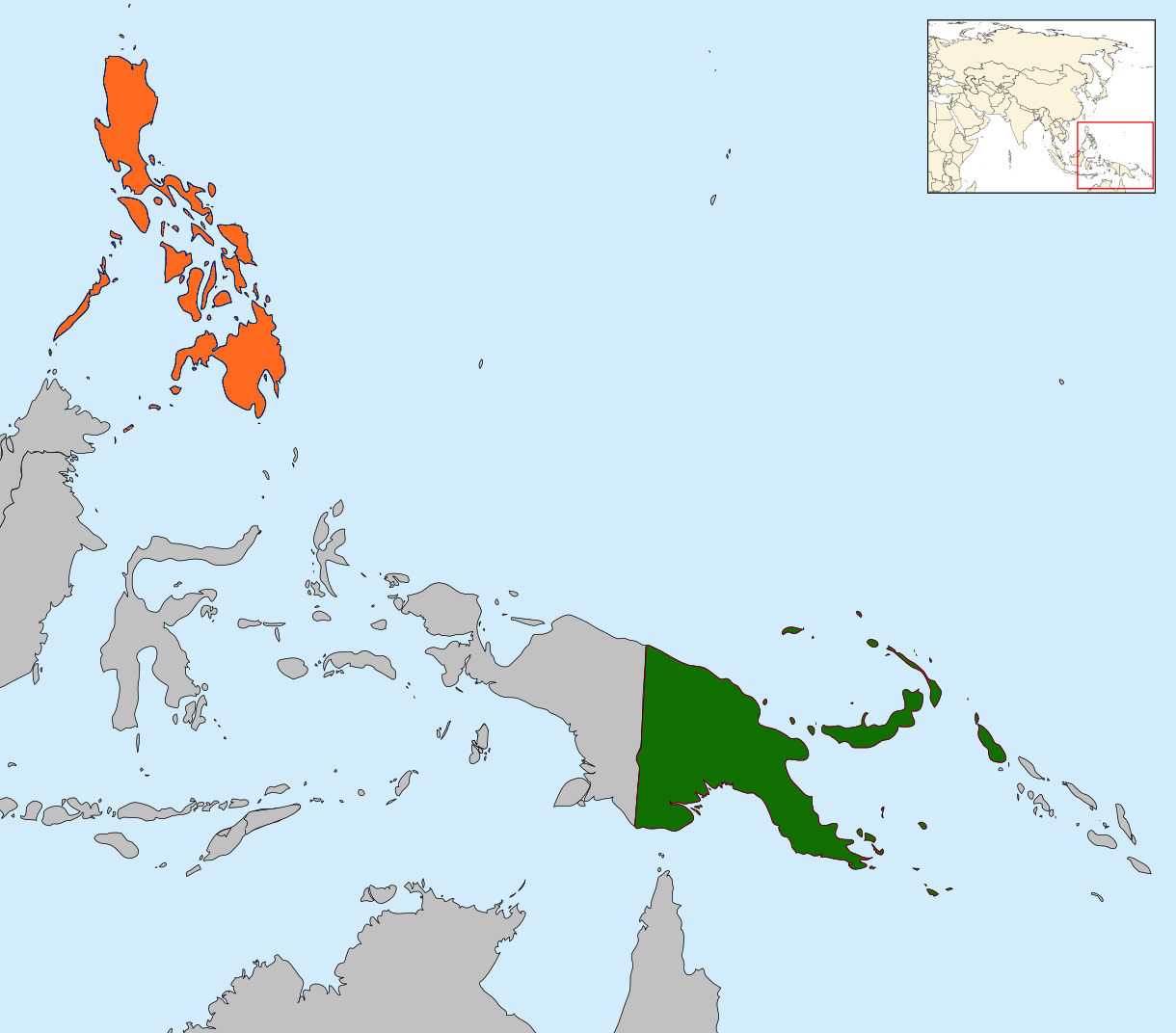

- Papua New Guinea: Philippines

Papua New Guinea–Philippines relations are the bilateral relations between Papua New Guinea and the Philippines. Papua New Guinea has an embassy in Manila and the Philippines has an embassy in Port Moresby.

== History ==
The Philippines established a Consulate-General in Port Moresby on August 19, 1974. Upon Papua New Guinea's independence on September 16, 1975, the Philippine consulate in Port Moresby was upgraded to an embassy making the Philippines one of the first countries to formalize diplomatic relations with Papua New Guinea.

== Economic relations ==
In March 2009, The Philippines and Papua New Guinea entered into a Memorandum of Understanding (MoU) that would enhance the cooperation between the two countries on the development of fisheries. The MoU will facilitate technology transfer in aquaculture development, promotion of shipping ventures, investments, technical training, joint research, and “strategic complementation” of each country's plans in the Coral Triangle – or the waters between the Philippines, Indonesia, and the Pacific Islands. The fisheries trade is significantly responsible for recent overall trade growth between the Philippines and Papua New Guinea.

In March 2012, the Philippine Bureau of Fisheries and Aquatic Resources started discussions with Papua New Guinea officials on the issues of access and trade. Under the proposed agreement, Papua New Guinea is willing to give fishing rights to Filipino commercial fishermen in its waters in exchange for agricultural commodities and rice.

In April 2024, Foreign Affairs Secretary Enrique Manalo Jr. started mentioning closer relations between the two countries in the sectors of air services, tourism, labor, agriculture fisheries and trade.

On June 17-18, 2024, the first ever Trade Committee Meeting between the two countries was held in Manila. In it, the trade ministers of both nations signed a Trade and Investment Partnership Agreement, which included a Free Trade Agreement.

In 2024, Philippine ambassador Edgar Tomas Auxilian reaffirmed the Philippines’ committment to developing Economy of Papua New Guinea Papua New Guinea’s economy, especially in manufacturing. Both nations acknowledged the other as an important ally in the pacific and emphasized their intent to explore economic opportunities for mutual benefit.

== Diaspora ==
There are about 25,000 Filipinos currently in Papua New Guinea as of 2013.

== Political relations ==
Papua New Guinea asked the Philippines for its support for its full membership bid in the Association of Southeast Asian Nations in 2009.

Papua New Guinea is intending on hosting the 2nd policy consultation meeting with the Philippines, a meeting meant to enhance diplomatic cooperation, specifically on international, mutual and regional issues.
