= Malaysia–Timor-Leste relations =

Malaysia–Timor Leste relations
- Malaysia: Timor-Leste

East Timor–Malaysia relations or Malaysia–Timor Leste relations are foreign relations between Malaysia and Timor Leste. Malaysia has an embassy in Dili, and Timor-Leste has an embassy in Kuala Lumpur. Malaysia supported Timor-Leste to be one of the members of ASEAN and towards becoming a democratic country.

== History ==
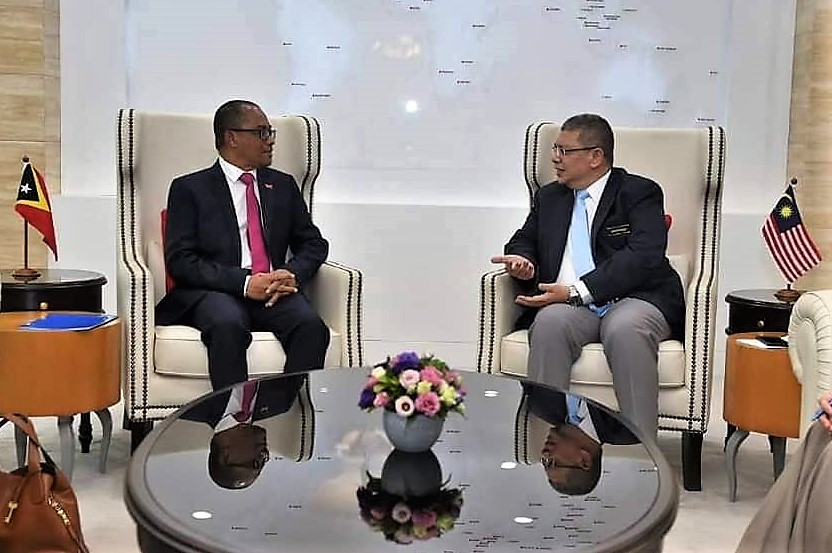
East Timor Foreign Minister Dionísio Babo visits his Malaysian counterpart Saifuddin Abdullah in Kuala Lumpur, 2019.

Since 1999, Malaysia has contributed to many UN peacekeeping missions on the country, such as one are the Operation Astute during the 2006 East Timorese crisis. Malaysia also has provided assistance to Timor-Leste in the area of human resources development through various training programmes and providing assistance to Timor-Leste in its nation building efforts. Currently, Malaysia has been consider by East Timorese as a model to develop their countries.

== Economic relations ==
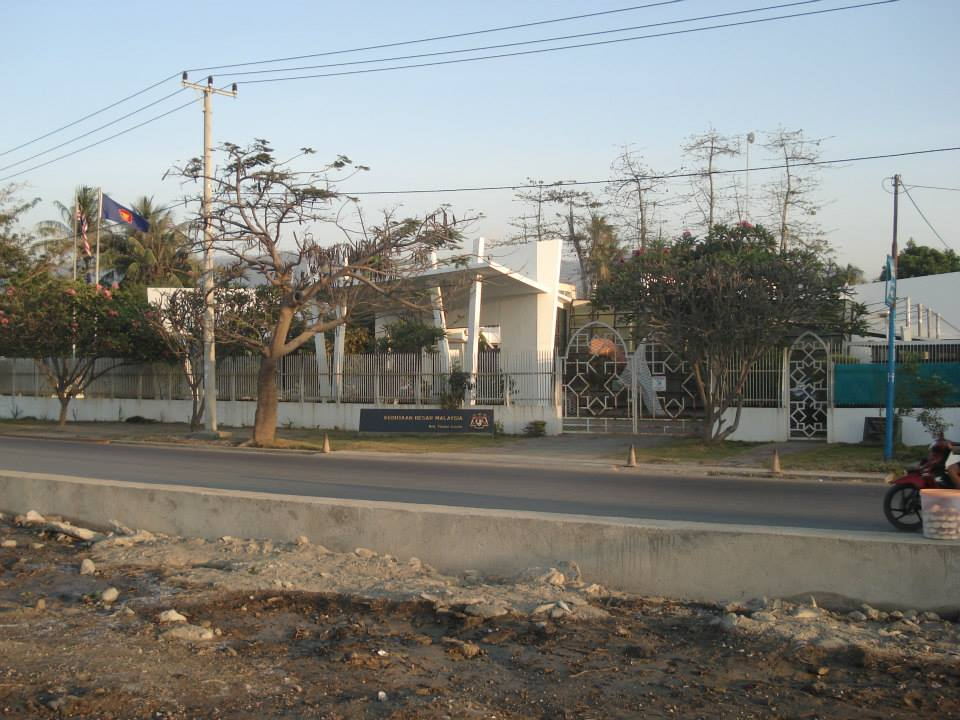
Malaysian embassy in Dili, East Timor.

Both countries are currently working together to expand the scope of co-operation and currently tangible signs of Malaysian presence in Timor-Leste can be seen in the form of restaurants, an English-teaching school and the supply of construction materials and spare parts for vehicles. In 2014, a memorandum of understanding on cooperative development and co-operation signed between the University of Malaysia Sabah and the National University of Timor-Leste, a day before an MoU on healthcare been signed. The total trade between the two countries has increased from U$10 million in 2012 to U$21.2 million in 2013 and the East Timorese government has expressed their interest to work with the Malaysian counterparts in oil and gas sectors.

== Diplomatic Relations ==
Malaysia recognized Timor-Leste immediately after its independence in 2002. The two nations established formal diplomatic ties in 2006 when Malaysia opened its embassy in Dili, followed by Timor-Leste's embassy in Kuala Lumpur in 2010.

List of Ambassadors Malaysian Ambassadors to Timor-Leste:

| Name | Tenure | Key Activities | Sources |
|---|---|---|---|
| Zainal Abidin Mohamed Zain | 2006–2009 | Established Malaysia's first embassy in Dili | The Star (2006) |
| Yahaya Abdul Jabar | 2009–2013 | Negotiated labor agreements for Timorese workers | Wisma Putra (2009) |
| Zainal Abidin Bakar | 2013–2017 | Promoted Malaysian infrastructure investments | Borneo Post (2014) |
| Izanee Che Ishak | 2017–2021 | Focused on education and palm oil trade | Bernama (2017) |
| Mohd Khalid Abbasi Abdul Razak | 2021–present | Supports Timor-Leste's ASEAN membership bid | New Straits Times (2021) |

Timorese Ambassadors to Malaysia

| Name | Tenure | Key Activities | Sources |
|---|---|---|---|
| Joaquim da Fonseca | 2010–2014 | First resident ambassador in KL | Timor Post (2010) |
| Filomeno Aleixo da Cruz | 2014–2018 | Advocated for migrant worker rights | Suara Timor Lorosae (2014) |
| Joaquim Lopes da Fonseca | 2018–2022 | Expanded trade relations | Tatoli (2018) |
| Marciano da Silva | 2022–present | Focuses on education partnerships | Dili Weekly (2022) |
