= Papua New Guinea–Timor-Leste relations =

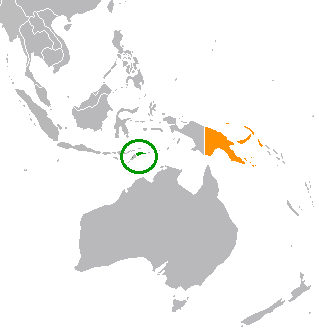

- Timor-Leste: Papua New Guinea

Papua New Guinea–Timor-Leste relations refer to foreign relations between the states of Timor-Leste and Papua New Guinea.

== History ==
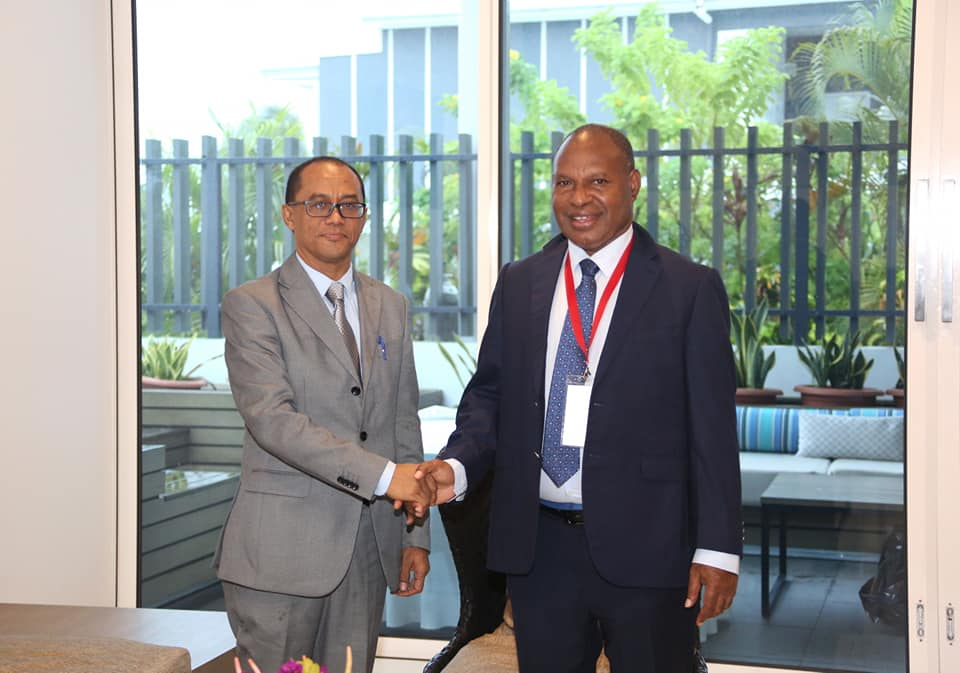
Ministers Dionísio Babo and Richard Maru (2019)

Timor-Leste and Papua New Guinea established diplomatic relations on 22 July 2002, at the end of an ACP Group conference in Fiji.

Timor-Leste is home to Papuan-speaking ethnic groups and maintains relations with the Melanesian and Pacific realm. As an observer, Timor-Leste participated in the third summit of the ACP states in July 2002 and, since August 2002, in the annual meetings of the heads of state and government of the Pacific Islands Forum. In 2016, the country joined the Pacific Islands Forum. Timor-Leste has had observer status in the Melanesian Spearhead Group since 2010.

Timor-Leste and Papua New Guinea are both members of the Non-Aligned Movement, Organisation of African, Caribbean and Pacific States and the G7+ states, in which Timor-Leste plays a leading role. Papua New Guinea holds observer status within ASEAN, while Timor-Leste became a full member since 26 October 2025.

In 2019, Richard Maru, Papua New Guinea's Minister of National Planning and Monitoring, visited Timor-Leste.

== Diplomatic missions ==
Papua New Guinea's ambassador in Jakarta, Indonesia is also responsible for Timor-Leste.

Timor-Leste is represented in Port Moresby by its Honorary Consul Chris Durman.

On 11 May 2026, Timorese President José Ramos-Horta and Papua New Guinean Prime Minister James Marape agreed to establish reciprocal embassies following a bilateral meeting ahead of the inaugural Melanesian Oceans Summit.

== Trade ==
The Timor-Leste Statistical Office does not report any trade relations between Timor-Leste and Papua New Guinea for 2018.

== See also ==
- Foreign relations of Timor-Leste
- Foreign relations of Papua New Guinea
