= St. Peter and St. Paul Major Seminary =

Roman Catholic seminary in Dili, Timor-Leste

St. Peter and St. Paul Interdiocesan Major Seminary
- Seminário Maior Interdiocesano de São Pedro e São Paulo
- Established: 10 July 2000; 25 years ago
- Religious affiliation: Roman Catholic
- Rector: Miguel Arcanjo da Costa
- Undergraduates: 250+ (2025)
- Location: Dili, Timor-Leste
- Campus: Urban
- Language: Portuguese, Tetum
- Dioceses served: Dili, Baucau, Maliana

St. Peter and St. Paul Interdiocesan Major Seminary (SPEPAL; Portuguese: Seminário Maior Interdiocesano de São Pedro e São Paulo; Tetum: Semináriu Maior Interdiosezanu São Pedro no São Paulo) is a Roman Catholic seminary located in Dili, Timor-Leste. Established in 2000 as the country's first major seminary, it serves the Archdiocese of Dili and the dioceses of Baucau and Maliana. Located in Fatumeta, the seminary currently enrolls more than 250 candidates for the priesthood.

== History ==
The seminary was established in 2000 by Bishop Carlos Filipe Ximenes Belo of Dili and Bishop Basílio do Nascimento of Baucau, who saw a need for a new seminary ahead of Timor-Leste's independence. Previously, the country had a minor seminary, Our Lady of Fatima Minor Seminary, but no major seminary. During the Portuguese colonial period, seminarians completed their studies in Macau and Portugal, and during the Indonesian occupation of East Timor between 1975–1999, candidates for the priesthood were sent to the seminaries of Flores, Kupang, and Malang. The new St. Peter and St. Paul Interdiocesan Major Seminary was canonically established by Bishop Belo on 10 July 2000. The seminary's first graduates were ordained in 2006. Between 2006 and 2008, the seminary ordained 36 new priests.

During the 2006 crisis in Timor-Leste, thousands of internally displaced people (IDPs) took refuge at the seminary. Mostly firaku (people from the eastern part of the country), they fled their homes in the nearby Bairro Pite area amid attacks by kaladi (people from the west) that peaked in May–June 2006. The seminary, which at the start of the crisis was home to 53 seminarians and six priests, became home to more than 4,000 IDPs at the height of the violence, per United Nations data. Another estimate put the figure as high as 7,000–8,000. During the crisis, mobs gathered outside the seminary gates to threaten and throw stones at the IDPs inside. The UN's International Organization for Migration provided humanitarian assistance to the camp, which as late as July 2008 was still home to more than 3,000 displaced people. From 2006 until the camp's closure, a health clinic operated at the seminary, staffed by Cuban doctors with support from the national hospital. The clinic, which served both the IDPs living at the seminary as well as people living in the nearby community, attended to more than 250 patients each day. The camp officially closed on 29 April 2008, when the last 173 families living at the seminary returned to their homes, with a grant from the Ministry of Social Solidarity to help them rebuild.

In 2013, the Instituto Superior de Filosofia e de Teologia (ISFIT) was established as an offshoot of the seminary, when the bishops of the Conferência Episcopal Timorense decided to create an institute of philosophical and theological study open not only to priests, but also laity. On 13 August 2015, the Secretary of State of the Holy See, Cardinal Pietro Parolin visited the seminary to celebrate mass with the seminarians, faculty, and bishops Norberto do Amaral and Basílio do Nascimento. On 21 September 2022, the Substitute for General Affairs of the Vatican Secretariat of State, Archbishop Edgar Peña Parra, visiting the seminary with Archbishop of Dili Cardinal Virgílio do Carmo da Silva and celebrated mass with the seminarians during his trip to Timor-Leste.

The seminary's enrollment has grown from 75 in 2008 to 126 in 2010, 150 in 2020, 238 in 2022, and more than 250 in 2025. The seminary receives candidates from Timor-Leste's three dioceses, as well as members of religious orders, including the Carmelites and Jesuits. The seminary's classes are conducted in Portuguese and Tetum.

== Rectors ==
- Alberto Ricardo da Silva (2000–2004)
- Domingos Alves da Costa (until 2012)
- Eduardo de Almeida (2012–c. 2022)
- Miguel Arcanjo da Costa (2024–present)

== Notable people ==
=== Faculty ===
- Leandro Maria Alves, Bishop of Baucau from 2023–present; served as formator at the seminary from 2008–2011
- Norberto do Amaral, Bishop of Maliana from 2010–present; served as professor of dogmatic theology and prefect of studies at the seminary from 2007–2010
- Martinho Gusmão, former priest and candidate in the 2022 East Timorese presidential election; taught philosophy at the seminary from 2006–2013
- Justino Guterres, academic, diplomat, and Ambassador of Timor-Leste to the Holy See 2007–2010; taught anthropology and sociology at the seminary from 2001–2006
- Vicente Guterres, politician; taught philosophy at the seminary from 2001–2006
- Alberto Ricardo da Silva, Bishop of Dili from 2004–2015; served as the seminary's first rector from 2000–2004

== See also ==
- Catholic Church in Timor-Leste
- List of Catholic seminaries
