= Municipal Market of Baucau =

Historic market in Baucau, East Timor

- Mercado Municipal de Baucau
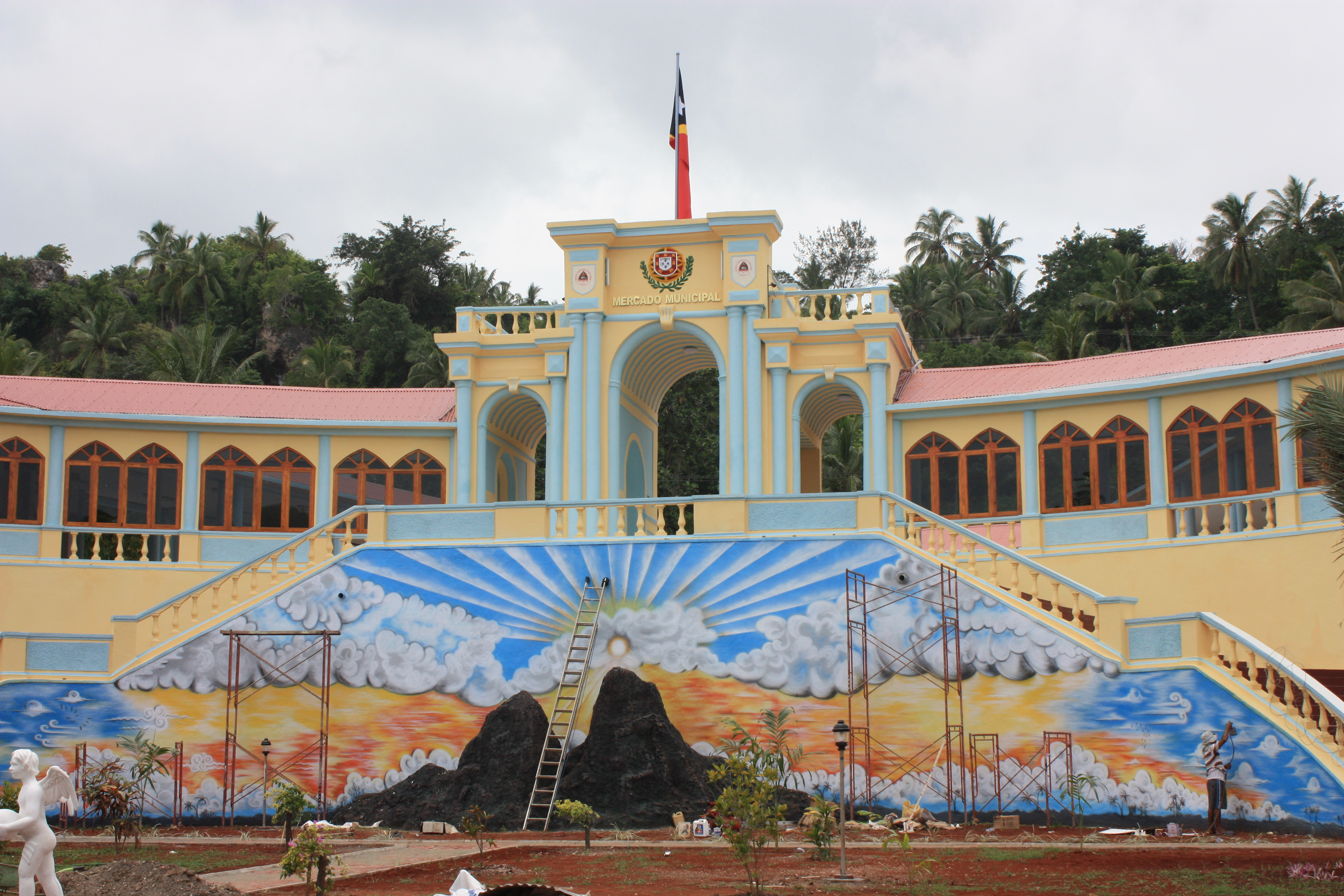
- The building in 2014
- Interactive map of the Municipal Market of Baucau area

General information
- Type: Former public market; Cultural centre
- Architectural style: Portuguese colonial
- Location: Baucau, East Timor
- Coordinates: 8°27′47″S 126°27′10″E
- Opened: 1932
- Renovated: 1970s / 2014

Technical details
- Floor count: 2

The old Municipal Market of Baucau (Portuguese: Mercado Municipal de Baucau) is an historic Portuguese colonial-style former public market in Baucau, East Timor. Since the completion of a renovation in 2014, it has been a cultural centre.

== History ==
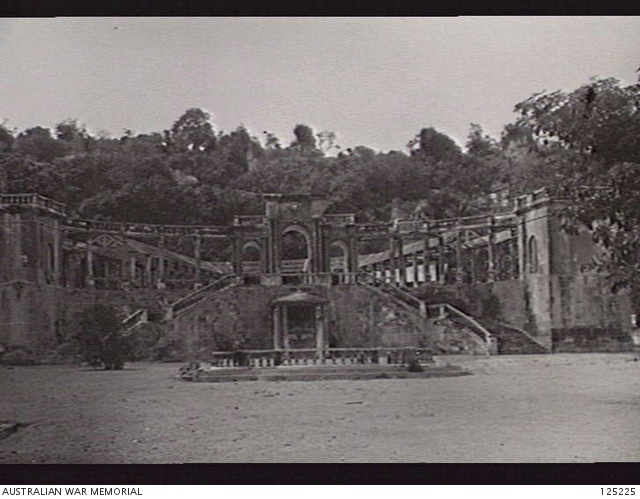
The war damaged building in 1946

The building was constructed at the initiative of Lieutenant Armando Eduardo Pinto Correia, administrator of the Baucau district from 1928 to 1934. It was part of an extravagant plan by Pinto Correia to build public buildings, residences and offices, and a group of schools, in the main towns of the district.

Opened in October 1932, the new structure "... acquired an unexpected place in the community due to the lightness of its lines and the clever way it was placed between the hillside and the meadowlands." However, it also came under fire from government bodies for being allegedly too opulent and excessive in size.

During World War II, the building was partially destroyed. It was not rebuilt until after 1970.

In March 1997, the VIP guests attending the installation of the first Bishop of Baucau, Basílio do Nascimento, dined at the market, which is beside the cathedral. Following the East Timorese independence referendum in 1999, the Indonesian military destroyed the market building again.

In 2009, the government of East Timor announced that the building, which was by then in an advanced state of degradation, would be refurbished. The aim of the restoration project was to repurpose the building as a cultural centre. According to the announcement, a mobile structure for cultural shows, conferences and exhibitions would be created in the building's central area, while rooms at its periphery would house exhibitions and a small library.

However, a Hong Kong-based journalist later reported that the "derelict old marketplace" was still yet to be restored even in 2012: "... the charming, if not slightly spooky, ... building ... sits in the centre of the laid back old town begging for restoration, nature slowly reclaiming it." The renovation work, which also involved repainting the originally white structure in a combination of yellow and blue hues with pink roofs, was not completed until 2014.

== Architecture ==
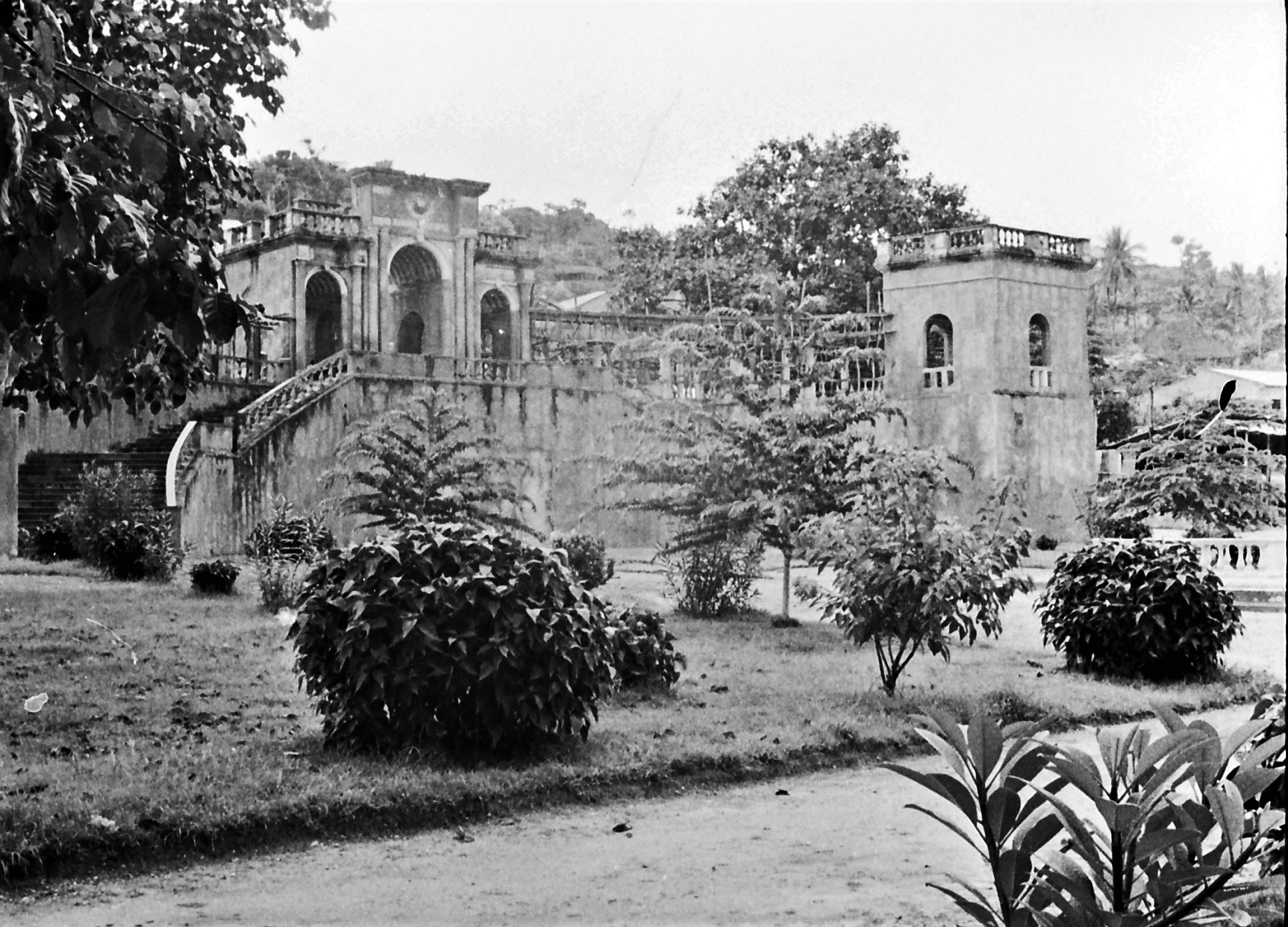
Another view of the building, in 1971

The building's French-influenced design is reminiscent of European fair and exhibition pavilions erected at the end of the 19th and beginning of the 20th century. At the time of its construction, it was unusually substantial for colonial Portuguese East Timor. Located on a slope running downwards from the south to the north, it was constructed as a large courtyard, now covered.

The southern side of the courtyard is surrounded by a semi-circular gallery made up of a colonnade and architraves. The ends of the gallery abut matching towers at the northeastern and northwestern corners of the building, respectively. The building's northern side is a less sharply curved, arched corridor linking the towers with open, well ventilated arcades. On a lower level to the north of, and overlooked by, the building is a form of public square.

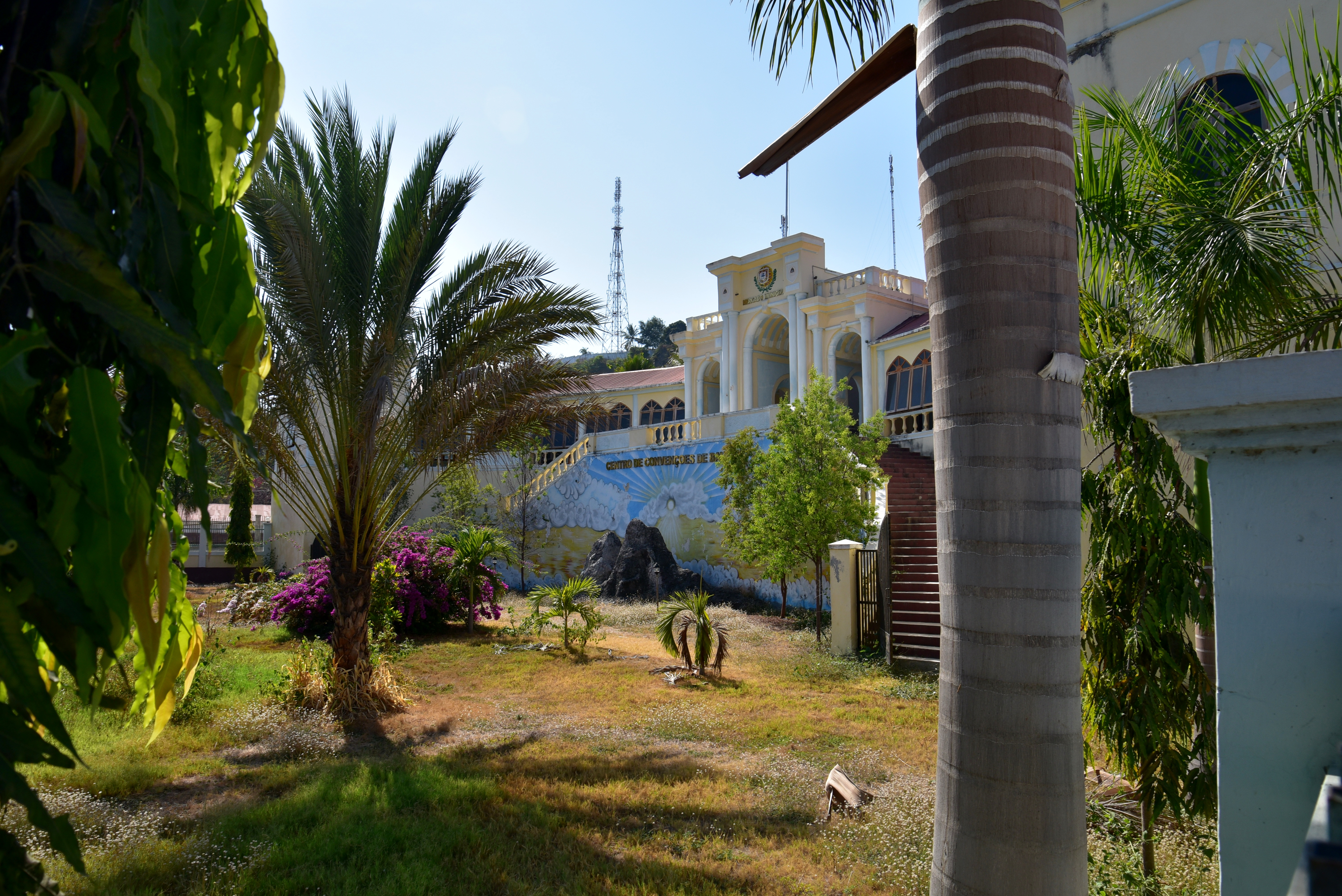
The building in 2018

The upper and lower levels are divided by a blank masonry retaining wall; two majestic staircases climb from the bases of the two towers to a landing in front of a triumphal central portal, which is crowned by a rectangular pediment decorated with the Portuguese coat of arms. Flanking the central arch of the portal are two columns with phytomorphic capitals, and also two lesser lateral arches in Serlian fashion. The columns and lateral arches combine to add lightness to both levels; they give the place a serenity more apposite to a temple.

The building originally also had a portal, pediment and columns at its lower level. Those elements were later eliminated, to the detriment of the building's composition. Additionally, the whole system of architraves between the columns of the upper floor colonnade was later decorated with lobular arches that transformed the building's appearance.
