= Leandro Maria Alves =

Roman Catholic bishop of Baucau, East Timor (born 1974)

The Most Reverend Leandro Maria Alves
- Bishop of Baucau
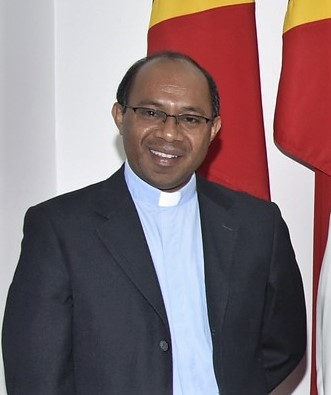
- Church: Roman Catholic Church
- Province: Díli
- Diocese: Baucau
- Appointed: 26 April 2023
- Predecessor: Basílio do Nascimento

Orders
- Ordination: 8 December 2006
- Consecration: 21 July 2023

Personal details
- Born: Leandro Maria Alves; 10 May 1974 (age 52): Ermera, Portuguese Timor; (now East Timor)
- Denomination: Roman Catholic
- Education: Widya Mandira Catholic University; Évora Higher Institute of Theology; Catholic University of Portugal; Pontifical Urban University
- Motto: Pertransivit benefaciendo

Leandro Maria Alves (born 10 May 1974) is the Roman Catholic Bishop of Baucau, East Timor. He was appointed on 26 April 2023. Previously, he served as deputy parish priest, parish administrator and parish priest of Dili Cathedral, and in many other offices in the Catholic Church in East Timor.

== Early life and education ==
Alves was born in Ermera, Portuguese Timor (now East Timor). Between 1990 and 1993, he attended St Joseph's College High School (Indonesian: SMA Kolese Santo Yoseph) in Dili, East Timor, which was then under Indonesian occupation. In 1993–1994, Alves spent a year studying a propaedeutics course, and in 1994–1995 he underwent spiritual preparation at the São Maria pilgrim hostel in Dare.

From 1995 to 1998, Alves studied in the Faculty of Philosophy and Theology at the Widya Mandira Catholic University (Indonesian: Universitas Katolik Widya Mandira) in Kupang, West Timor, Indonesia. Between 1999 and 2001, he completed a pastoral year at the Minor Seminary in Balide, Dili. From 2001 until 2004, he studied theology at the Évora Higher Institute of Theology (Portuguese: Instituto Superior de Teologia de Évora) in Évora, Portugal, and at the Faculty of Theology of the Catholic University of Portugal (Portuguese: Universidade Católica Portuguesa).

Later, between 2014 and 2017, Alves completed a licentiate in dogmatic theology at the Pontifical Urban University (Italian: Pontificia Università Urbaniana) in Rome, Italy.

== Ministry ==
=== Priesthood ===
In 2004–2005, Alves served as a pastor in the parish of Turiscai. He was ordained as a deacon in 2005, and as a priest to serve in the clergy of Dili on 8 December 2006.

From 2006 to 2007, Alves was deputy parish priest of Dili Cathedral. Between 2008 and 2011, he served as formator of the Seminary of SS Peter and Paul (Portuguese: São Pedro e São Paulo Major Seminary) (2008–2011), and from 2009 to 2014, he was director of the São Paulo Diocesan Foundation of Dili and executive director of the National Commission for Catholic Education of East Timor of the Episcopal Conference of Timor.

Alves also served between 2010 and 2012 as secretary of the diocesan Presbyteral Council of Díli, and between 2011 and 2014 as both rector of the Nossa Senhora de Fátima, Dili, and director of the associated Catholic Secondary School.

After taking a break to complete his licentiate in dogmatic theology, Alves was, from 2017 to 2020, chair of the Quality Assurance Commission for Studies at the Dom Jaime Garcia Goulart Higher Institute of Philosophy and Theology in Dili (ISFIT) of the Episcopal Conference of Timor. Commencing in 2017, he was also a professor of dogmatic theology at ISFIT and executive secretary of the Episcopal Conference of Timor (CET), and from 2019, president of the Union of Clergy of the Archdiocese of Dili.

Simultaneously, from 2017 to 2019, Alves was once again deputy parish priest of Dili Cathedral, and then, from 2020 to 2022, parish administrator of the cathedral. He became the cathedral's parish priest in 2023.

=== Episcopacy ===
On 26 April 2023, the Holy See announced that Pope Francis had appointed Alves as bishop of the diocese of Baucau, a post that had been vacant since the death of the previous incumbent, Basílio do Nascimento, in October 2021. Alves was consecrated on 21 July 2023.

Catholic Church titles
Preceded by Basílio do Nascimento	Bishop of Baucau; 2023–present	Incumbent
