= Colégio de São José Operário =

St. Joseph's High School
- Portuguese: Colégio de São José
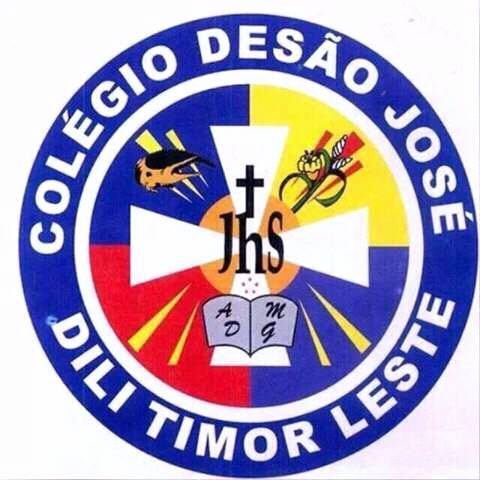

Location
- Dili; Timor-Leste; 9°25′10.82″S 125°6′49.32″E

Information
- Type: Private secondary school
- Motto: Men and Women for Others
- Religious affiliation: Catholicism
- Denomination: Jesuit (1993 – 2011)
- Established: 1979; 47 years ago
- Founder: Catholic Diocese of Díli
- Oversight: Catholic Diocese of Díli
- Staff: 36
- Enrollment: 693 students
- Website: saojose.wordpress.com

St Joseph's High School (Portuguese: Colégio de São José) is a private Catholic secondary school, located in Dili, Timor Leste. The school was founded by the Catholic Diocese of Díli in 1983–84, when East Timor was still part of Indonesia. In 1993 the school was entrusted to the Society of Jesus, with a ten-year commitment.

In 2011, the bishop of the Diocese of Dili resumed its direction. Some 50 students are seminarians, planning to become priests.

== History ==
The history of the school begins with an initiative by the Indonesian government of occupation, to enlist the support of Catholic traditionalists groups in Timor, so that, by allowing the founding of a school, it opens a channel of dialogue with the main support group for the insurgent organizations CNRM and FRETILIN.

=== Foundation ===
The Indonesian government then allowed the creation of an educational institution by the name Catholic School of Middle Education (SPGK; in Indonesian: Sekolah Pendidikan Guru Katolik) in 1979, in response to international criticism of the severe repression of civilians and the destruction of the Timorese educational system. The school was born to disseminate the principles of pancasila, which was strongly supported by religion.

In 1983 the school started to be tutored only by the São Paulo Educational Foundation of the Diocese of Díli, adopting the name St. Joseph the Worker School (in Portuguese: Externato de São José Operário), for the first time allowing the teaching of Portuguese, being the only school (with the exception of seminars Catholics) to teach the language during Indonesian rule.

Having been forced to close its doors in 1992, on charges of subversion, in 1993 Bishop Dom Ximenes Belo transferred the administration of the São José Day School to the Society of Jesus, as a maneuver for the institution to return to work.

Jesuits at the school would be a mediating force during the independence war, but priests and religious along with two Jesuits were killed by the Indonesian militia. In 1995 the faculty consisted of three Jesuits along with Jesuit scholastics, occasionally some Franciscan sisters, and Indonesian Muslims, East Timorese Christians, and Hindus from Bali.

On August 26, 1999, in an impromptu assembly, Father Joseph Ageng Marwata announced that the São José Day School would be closed indefinitely owing to "unexpected events". In October 1999, the school opened its doors to shelter refugees from the 1999 Timorese crisis, reaching 5000 people. In 1999 the school had 350 students and 42 teachers. After the crisis the school was reduced to 252 students and four teachers. In 2003 it had increased to 280 students with 10 full-time staff and 16 part-time teachers.

In 2000, reflecting the political change brought about by UNTAET's mandate, the school resumed its activities, but with a reduced number of students and teachers. With the return, the institution changed its name to St Joseph's High School or "St. Joseph the Worker Secondary School" (in Portuguese: Escola Secundária São José Operário).

At a Children's Day symposium in 2007, students from the school told of the continuing efforts needed to secure the rights of children in the country. Through the Jesuit-run Sophia University the school has formed a sister-school relationship with Sophia Fukuoka Junior and Senior High School in Fukuoka City, Chuo-ku, Tokyo, Japan.

In 2011, after 18 years under the administration of the Society of Jesus, the school was once again administered by the Diocese of Dili.

== See also ==
- Catholic Church in Timor-Leste
- List of Jesuit schools
