= List of Catholic dioceses in Timor-Leste =

The Catholic Church in East Timor, based only from Latin rites, currently consists of one archdiocese and two dioceses forming an ecclesiastical province. Previously, it only comprised three exempt dioceses, all immediately subjecting to the Holy See and depending on the Roman Congregation for the Evangelization of Peoples. On September 11, 2019, Pope Francis elevated the Diocese of Dili to the rank of a metropolitan archdiocese and, at the same time, formed the Ecclesiastical Province of Dili. He also raised Bishop Virgílio do Carmo da Silva to the rank of an archbishop.

All dioceses in East Timor are part of a national Episcopal Conference of Timor (Conferência Episcopal Timorense). There is an apostolic nunciature as papal diplomatic representation (embassy-level) to Timor-Leste (East Timor), but it is located in neighboring Indonesia's capital, Jakarta, at the same address as the Apostolic Nunciature to Indonesia, which however has another incumbent.

There are no Eastern Catholic, pre-diocesan or defunct jurisdictions.

== List of dioceses ==
=== Ecclesiastical Province of Dili ===
- Archdiocese of Díli: Cardinal Virgílio do Carmo da Silva, S.D.B.
  - Diocese of Baucau: Mgr. Leandro Maria Alves
  - Diocese of Maliana: Mgr. Norberto do Amaral

== See also ==
- List of Catholic dioceses (structured view)
- Catholic Church in East Timor

== Sources and external links ==
- GCatholic.org - data for all sections.
- Catholic-Hierarchy.
