= Alberto Ricardo da Silva =

East Timorese Roman Catholic bishop

The Most Reverend Alberto Ricardo da Silva
- Bishop of Dili
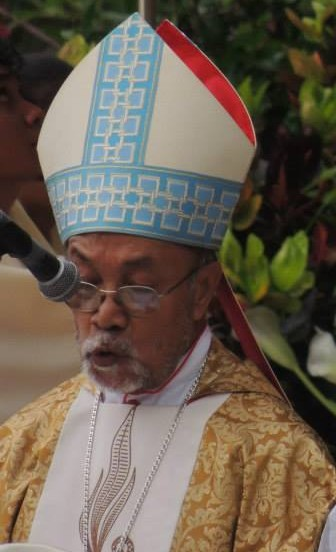
- Church: Roman Catholic Church
- Diocese: Dili
- Appointed: 27 February 2004
- Term ended: 9 February 2015
- Predecessor: Basílio do Nascimento; (as Apostolic Administrator)
- Successor: Virgilio do Carmo da Silva

Orders
- Ordination: 15 August 1972
- Consecration: 2 May 2004 by Basílio do Nascimento

Personal details
- Born: 24 April 1943 Aileu, Portuguese Timor (now Timor-Leste)
- Died: 2 April 2015 (aged 71) Dili, Timor-Leste
- Denomination: Roman Catholic

Alberto Ricardo da Silva (4 April 1943 – 2 April 2015) was the Roman Catholic bishop of Dili, Timor-Leste.

== Early life ==
He was born in Aileu, in Timor-Leste when it was still a Portuguese colony. He studied in the minor seminary of Dili and was sent to Macao to study philosophy, and to Portugal to study theology in the major seminary of Leiria.

== Career ==
He was ordained a priest on 15 August 1972 in Portugal and served as vicar general of Dili 1980-1992. He held a licentiate in spiritual theology from the Pontifical Gregorian University in Rome.

Father da Silva's duties included spiritual director and later rector at the Seminary of Our Lady of Fatima in Dare. He was rector of the Major Seminary of SS Peter and Paul in Dili at the time of his episcopal appointment.

Pope John Paul II named him as bishop of Dili on 27 February 2004 and he was consecrated on 2 May. The Bishop took for his motto "Servus Verbi Domini" (Servant of the Word of God).

He was consecrated by Bishop Basilio do Nascimento of Baucau, Timor-Leste, in the presence of seven bishops from Australia, Indonesia, Japan, Macau, and Portugal. Nearly 30,000 people attended the consecration at Immaculate Conception cathedral, including the secretary of the Apostolic Nunciature in Indonesia, Msgr. Novatus Rugambwa, the President of Timor-Leste Xanana Gusmão, Prime Minister Mari Alkatiri, along with Cabinet members and foreign envoys.

== Later career ==
On 5 December 2005, he wrote to UN Secretary-General Kofi Annan to reiterate the importance of justice to the people of Timor-Leste. He was concerned that politicians want to bury the truth to ensure that there is no accountability for those responsible for the atrocities committed from 1975 to 1999. He strongly urged the Secretary General to recommend that the Security Council adopt a Resolution under Chapter VII of the United Nations Charter to create an international tribunal for Timor-Leste.

On 1 April 2007, the Bishop told some 2,000 young Catholics during Mass at the Immaculate Conception Cathedral, Dili to commemorate the 22nd World Youth Day, to forgive each other, reconcile and forge ahead in rebuilding their violence-racked country.

On 21 February 2012, Bishop da Silva led a peace walk from Nossa Senhora Auxiliadora Church in Comoro to the bishop’s residence in Lecidere. Around 5,000 people took part, including priests, nuns, seminarians, laypeople, government officials and foreign ambassadors. The Bishop called on the people participate in the upcoming presidential election peacefully. In February 2015, Pope Francis accepted his resignation as Bishop of Dili.

Bishop da Silva died of brain cancer on 2 April 2015. On 30 January 2016, he was succeeded by Virgílio do Carmo da Silva who was appointed by Pope Francis as Bishop of Dili.

In April 2016, the Timor-Leste Prime Minister Rui Maria de Araujo praised the late Bishop da Silva as well as other Church leaders for their "invaluable and unselfish contribution" in the country's struggle for independence. He was speaking at a Mass to celebrate the first anniversary of the bishop's death.

Catholic Church titles
Preceded by Basílio do Nascimento as Apostolic Administrator	Bishop of Díli; 2004–2015	Succeeded by Basílio do Nascimento as Apostolic Administrator
