= FOKUPERS =

- Forum Komunikasi Perempuan Timor Lorosa'e
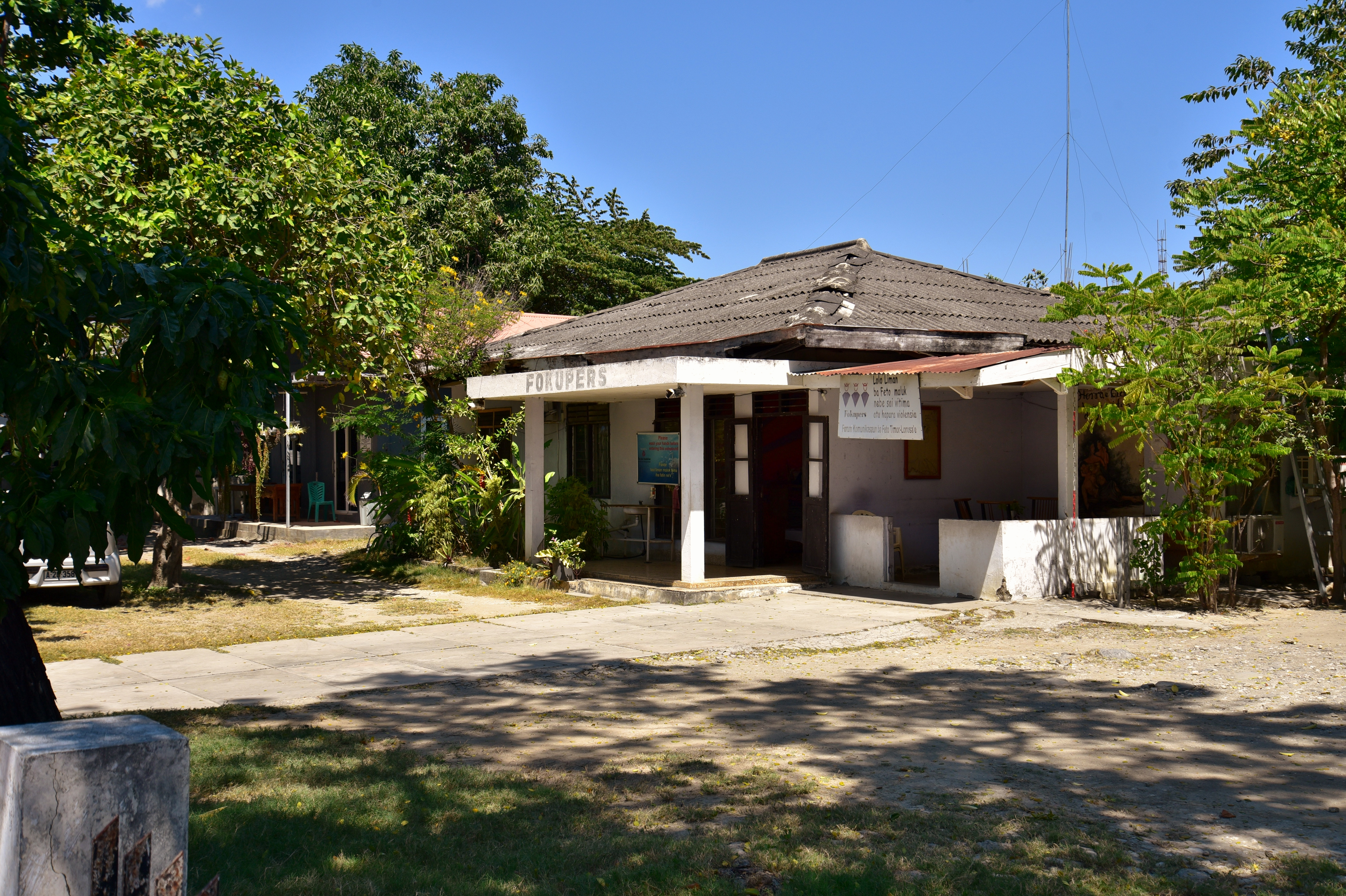
- FOKUPERS, Dili, 2023
- Formation: 1997; 29 years ago
- Founder: Timorese women activists involved in clandestine resistance networks
- Type: NGO / Non-profit organization
- Legal status: Active
- Purpose: Women's Rights, Advocacy, Gender Justice, Violence Prevention, Survivor Support
- Headquarters: Dili, Timor‑Leste
- Region served: Timor‑Leste
- Website: fokupers.org

The Forum Komunikasi Perempuan Timor Lorosa'e (lit. 'East Timor Women's Communication Forum'), or FOKUPERS, is an organization founded in 1997 to address gender‑based violence and human rights violations against women and children in Timor-Leste. The organization supports survivors of gender-based violence, conducts community education programs, advocates for changes to laws and policies that uphold women's rights. It is widely recognized as one of the first independent women's NGOs that was established during the Indonesian occupation.

== History ==
Decolonization and Political Crisis (1974-1975)

East Timor was a colony of Portugal since the 17th century when the new government officially accepted the terms of the 1960 UN resolution on decolonisation. East Timor had two popular parties, the Timorese Democratic Union (UDT― União Democratica Timorense) and the Timorese Social Democratic Association (ASDT―Associacao Social Democratica Timorense), that now changed its name to Fretilin ―the Revolutionary Front for an Independent East Timor (Frente Revolucionária do Timor-Leste Independente) in September 1974. UDT and Fretilin had both agreed to seek East Timor's independence, and created a transitional government. Indonesia exploited their inexperience by seeking to erode the potential of a united East Timor by leveraging inter‑party mistrust. Indonesia's attempt to pit the two parties against each other succeeded in undermining the possibility of a unified independence movement, by encouraging divisions, spreading misinformation, contributing to the collapse of the coalition between Fretilin and UDT. This internal conflict created the conditions for Indonesia to justify intervention, ultimately paving the way for its full-scale invasion in December 1975 and the formal integration of East Timor as Indonesia's 27th province in 1976, an annexation which the United Nations never recognized.

Humanitarian Impact of the Occupation

The humanitarian situation in East Timor deteriorated rapidly after the invasion. To flee the invasion, many Timorese went to the mountains for refuge, as the majority of the population was against Indonesia's invasion. Five months after the occupation, senior Jesuit and Divine Word Missionary officials were permitted to visit Timor-Leste. Their report estimated that only about 150, 000 people remained in areas under Indonesian control, while between 50,000 and 100,000 were killed. Two thirds of the Timorese had either taken refuge in the mountains or been killed. After three years of war and famine, the population remaining in the mountains were forced to return to areas controlled by Indonesia, which according to Indonesian official sources, was about 170 000 people, coming down from the mountains in 1978. These people were placed in guarded camps where they suffered different forms of starvation and mistreatment. Although the Indonesian military consolidated through forced relocations and guarded camps, Timorese civilians continued to resist. Armed groups and clandestine networks formed themselves to share information and preserve cultural identity. During the Indonesian occupation, the CAVR - Commission for Reception, Truth and Reconciliation in East Timor, documented widespread and systematic sexual violence against Timorese women, including inside military installations. It was found by the commission that women detainees were subjected to repeated sexual assault, coercion and severe physical abuse, often over extended periods of detention. The commission also reports cases of sexual slavery, to which women were forced into domestic servitude and subjected to ongoing sexual violence.

Emergence of FOKUPERS

FOKUPERS was created in July 1997 to support women victim of violence during the occupation. It contributed to raising public awareness of the issues of domestic violence. It was also the first independent women's NGO to form. During the final years of the Indonesian occupation, the Indonesian military was not held accountable and the survivors therefore had no real way to report sexual violence or seek justice. Displaced communities began to return from the mountains in 1999 and an increasing number of women disclosed their experience of conflict-related sexual violence. Fokupers, alongside other human rights organisations, documented these experiences by taking affidavits from returning refugees as these began to share their stories. The full extent of the violence was still unknown at that time. As these documentations increased, Fokupers expanded its efforts to reach out to women survivors of CRSV - Wartime sexual violence. They gathered testimonies and evidence, as well as tried to link survivors to the limited support services that were available. During the 1999 crisis, Fokupers was one of the local NGOs that was consulted by the United Nations Special Rapporteurs investigating human rights violations in East Timor.

== Organizational Development ==
Since Timor-Leste independence, after the end of the Indonesian occupation, Fokupers has undergone a gradual shift in its focus and activities. As the group originally focused on documenting and supporting survivors in conflict-related sexual violence, its work gradually shifted towards responding to cases of domestic violence and other forms of gender-based harm. Fokupers continues to encounter survivors of conflict-era abuses among its clients, but does not record these cases as a distinct category.

Fokupers has now restructured its internal divisions, operating through three main program areas: Advocacy and Awareness, Survivors' Empowerment, and Legal Assistance. These programs include community awareness, trainings and advocacy to strengthen women's rights at all levels, and intersection.

== Programs and Activities ==
Support Services

Fokupers engages with women survivors by supporting them to come together for group solidarity, education within the community about CRSV, experiences lived by women during conflicts and the persistent challenges, and psychological support. Their work strengthens survivors' ability to organize and advocate for their rights, while also offering direct practical support, such as through distribution of sewing machines. Additionally, the organization helps connect survivors with government support programs.

In 2002, the organization was part of a campaign for the adoption of the Law Against Domestic Violence (Lei Kontra Violénsia Doméstika, LKVD). The law was enacted in 2010, and later spread across municipalities.

== Achievements ==
Constitutional Participation (2001)

In 2001, women affiliated with Fokupers led a national campaign initiative to ensure women's voices in rural areas were represented in the new RDTL Constitution. Out of the 10 demands they asked for, 9 were successfully secured.

Fokupers has now established two women's shelters (Uma-Mahon), one in Dili and one in Maliana, as well as a transit house in Suai. These shelters provide direct assistance to women affected by gender-based violence and ensure the well-being of victims. They were initially created in 1998 to enhance the temporary shelters for victims of the Indonesian occupation, but today still operate and provide direct protection to women escaping violence.

== Funding ==
The organization's funding structure combines grants from international partners with financial support from the Timor-Leste government, which reflects the broader funding model that is common among NGOs in the country.

== Conflict with Catholic Church ==
In March 2009, a representative of FOKUPERS spoke at the Women for Peace Conference in Dili, advocating for the decriminalization of abortion in Timor-Leste "based on [the mother's] circumstances." The conference panel utlimately recommended that abortion should be legal in cases of incest, sexual abuse, and whenever the pregnancy threatens the life of the mother or the baby.

The panel's recommendations were opposed by the Catholic Church, which 95% of Timor-Leste's population are members of. The dioceses of Dili and Baucau requested that the legislature of Timor-Leste make no changes to the existing code on abortion, which had been criminalized during the Indonesian Occupation. The Church held that solutions to women's issues in the country should instead be solved by addressing poverty, trauma, and unemployment.

== Bibliography ==
- Commission for Reception, Truth and Reconciliation in Timor-Leste. (2005). Chega! A plain guide: The final report of the Timor-Leste Commission for Reception, Truth and Reconciliation. https://truthcommissions.humanities.mcmaster.ca/wp-content/uploads/2021/02/Report_Chega_A-Plain-Guide_Final-Report-of-the-Timor-Leste-Commission-for-Reception-Truth-and-Reconciliation_TRC.pdf
- Global Survivors Fund. (2023). Timor-Leste: Country report. https://www.globalsurvivorsfund.org/wp-content/uploads/2025/09/Report_Timor-Leste_Dec2023_EN_Web.pdf
- Fernandes, C. (2015). Accomplice to mass atrocities: The international community and Indonesia’s invasion of East Timor. Politics and Governance, 3(4), 1–11. 10.17645/pag.v3i4.272.
- FOKUPERS. (2025). The access to justice, land and property for survivors of gender-based violence in Timor-Leste. FOKUPERS.
- Hall, N. (2009). "East Timorese Women Challenge Domestic Violence". Australian Journal of Political Science. 44 (2): 309–325. doi:10.1080/10361140902862818.
- Hill, H. (2005). Co-operating with TImor-Leste: Options for Good Practice edited by Helen Hill and Pamela Thomas.
- Hunt, J. (2016). "FOKUPERS–The East Timorese Women's Communication Forum: The development of Timor's first women's NGO". Women and the Politics of Gender in Post-Conflict Timor-Leste. Routledge. pp. 65–82.
- Leach, M., Mendes, N. C., da Silva, A. B., Ximenes, A. da C., & Boughton, B. (Eds.). (2010). Hatene kona ba / Compreender / Understanding / Mengerti Timor-Leste: Proceedings of the Understanding Timor-Leste Conference, Universidade Nasional Timor-Lorosa’e, Dili, Timor-Leste, 2–3 July 2009. Timor-Leste Studies Association.
- Loney, Hannah; Pereira, Zelia; Webster, David; Feijó, Rui Graça (2025). Loney, Hannah; Pereira, Zelia; Webster, David; Feijó, Rui Graca (eds.). Everyday Diplomats: The Global Solidarity Movement for Timor-Leste, 1975-99. Timor International Solidarity Archive. doi:10.71661/181. ISBN 978-1-0695889-0-6.
- United Nations. (2002). The United Nations and East Timor: An overview of events leading to independence. Department of Public Information. https://peacekeeping.un.org/mission/past/etimor/UntaetB.htm
- United Nations General Assembly. (1999). Situation of human rights in East Timor: Report of the joint mission to East Timor undertaken by the Special Rapporteurs (A/54/660). https://digitallibrary.un.org/record/407002
