= Immaculate Conception Cathedral, Dili =

Immaculate Conception Metropolitan Cathedral Portuguese: Catedral Metropolitana da Imaculada Conceição
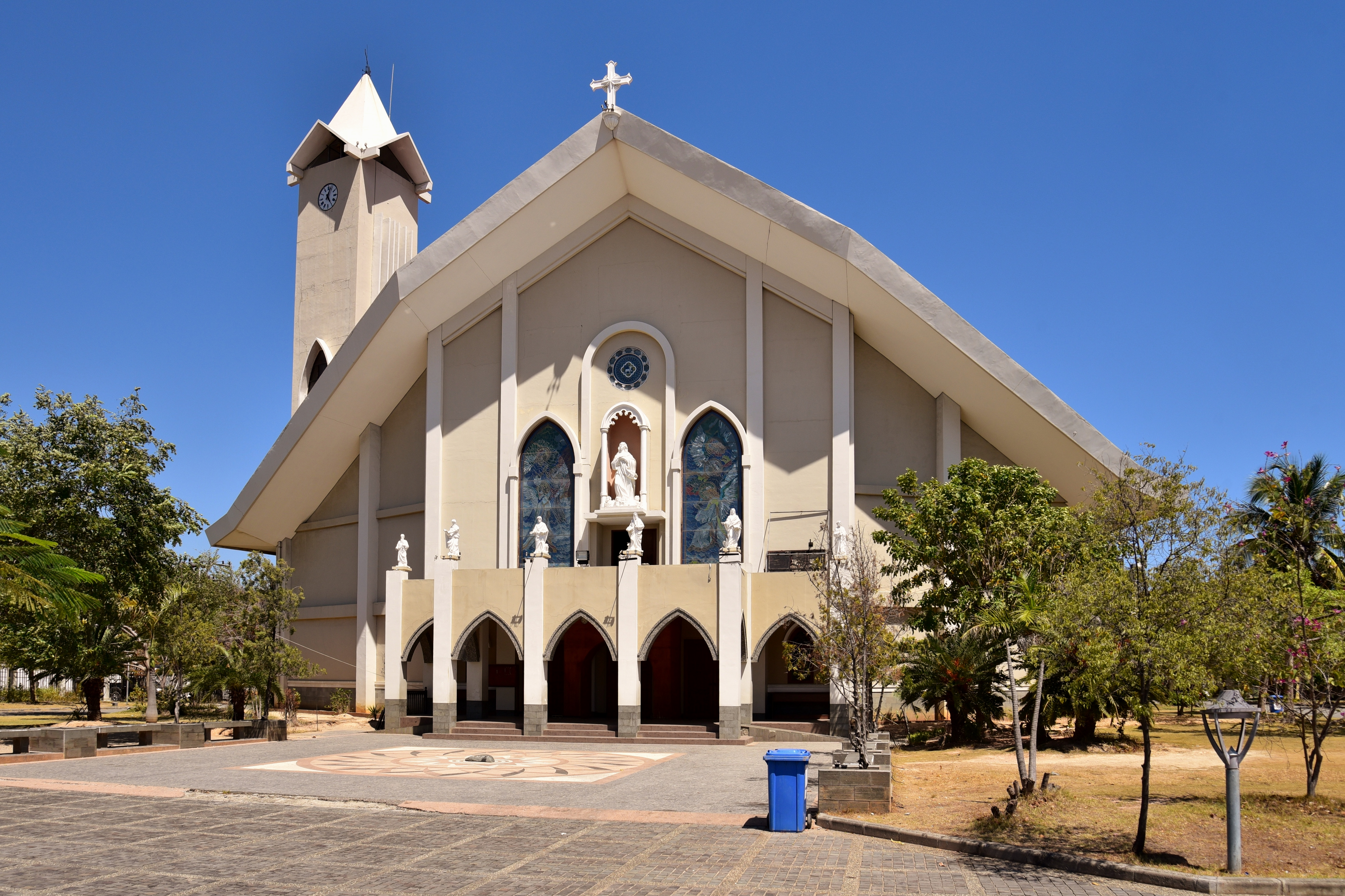
- The cathedral in 2023
- Immaculate Conception Metropolitan Cathedral; Portuguese: Catedral Metropolitana da Imaculada Conceição
- 8°33′30″S 125°34′3″E
- Location: Díli
- Country: Timor-Leste
- Denomination: Roman Catholic

History
- Status: Cathedral
- Consecrated: 2 November 1988

Architecture
- Functional status: Active

Administration
- Province: Dili
- Diocese: Dili

Clergy
- Bishop: Rt. Rev. Virgílio do Carmo da Silva, SDB, DD

The Immaculate Conception Metropolitan Cathedral (Portuguese: Catedral Metropolitana da Imaculada Conceição) in Dili is the main church of the Roman Catholic Archdiocese of Dili, Timor-Leste.

== History ==
Plans to build the cathedral began in 1984, with the Indonesian government providing funding totalling about US$235,000. The cathedral, situated on a 10,000-square-meter plot, measures 1,800 square meters and can hold 2,000 people. Indonesian president Soeharto on 2 November 1988 officially inaugurated Dili's new Catholic cathedral, reportedly the largest in Southeast Asia. The ceremony was attended by Dili's apostolic administrator, Bishop Carlos Filipe Ximenes Belo.

In October 1989 it was blessed by Pope John Paul II.

The cathedral played an important part in the country's independence struggle, with leaders like the Nobel laureate Bishop Belo advising people to go into the country's election with the spirit of humility of Jesus Christ.

The Church of San Antonio de Motael was the pro-cathedral of Dili before the cathedral was constructed.

== Current events ==
On 1 March 2007 the country's new apostolic nuncio, Archbishop Leopoldo Girelli, celebrated Mass at the cathedral and then visited camps for displaced people in and around the capital, and the Seminary of Our Lady of Fatima.

On 27 April 2002 around 2,000 people gathered at the cathedral for the arrival from Portugal of a statue of Our Lady of Fatima, which was to go on tour for three weeks as part of the celebrations ahead of the country's independence. Mary, Our Lady of Fatima, is the patroness of East Timor. Among those welcoming the statue were Bishop Carlos Filipe Ximenes Belo, Bishop Basilio do Nascimento and other religious representatives.

The two Catholic bishops of East Timor and the papal nuncio to the country jointly urged people to end a prolonged spate of violence and pray for national reconciliation and peace, after Mass on 4 March 2007 at Immaculate Conception Cathedral.

Father Jose Maia was the parish priest of Immaculate Conception Cathedral in 2009.

== Gallery ==
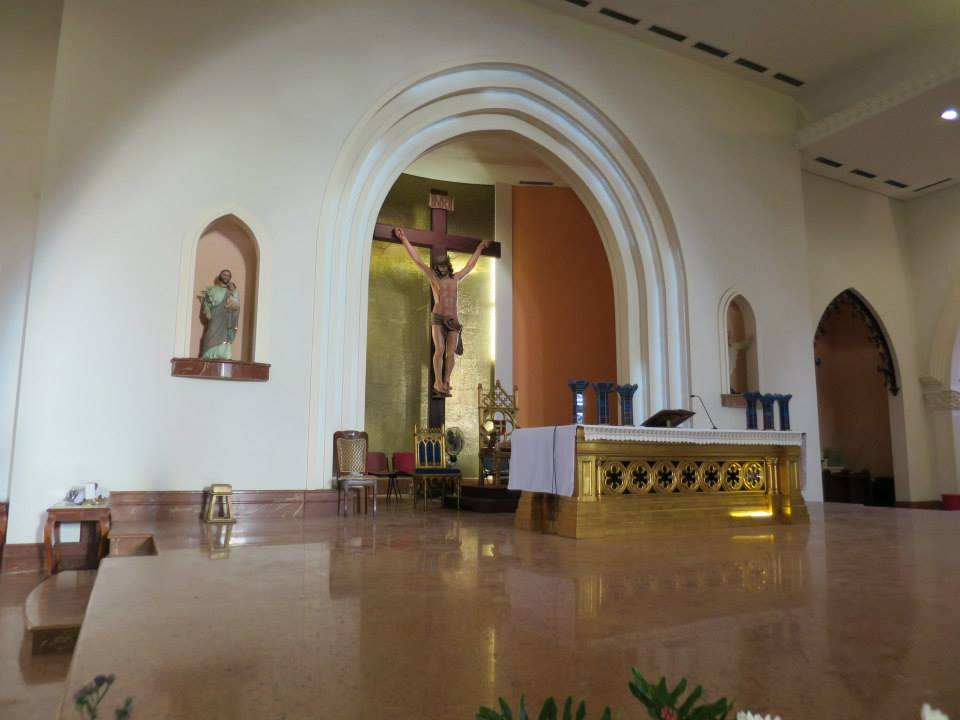
Altar

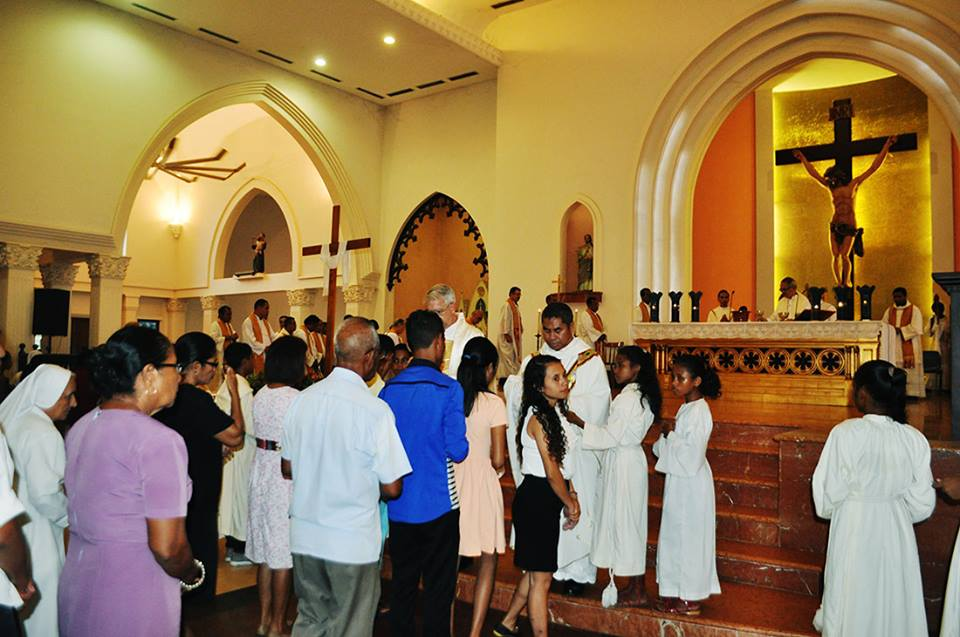
Church mass

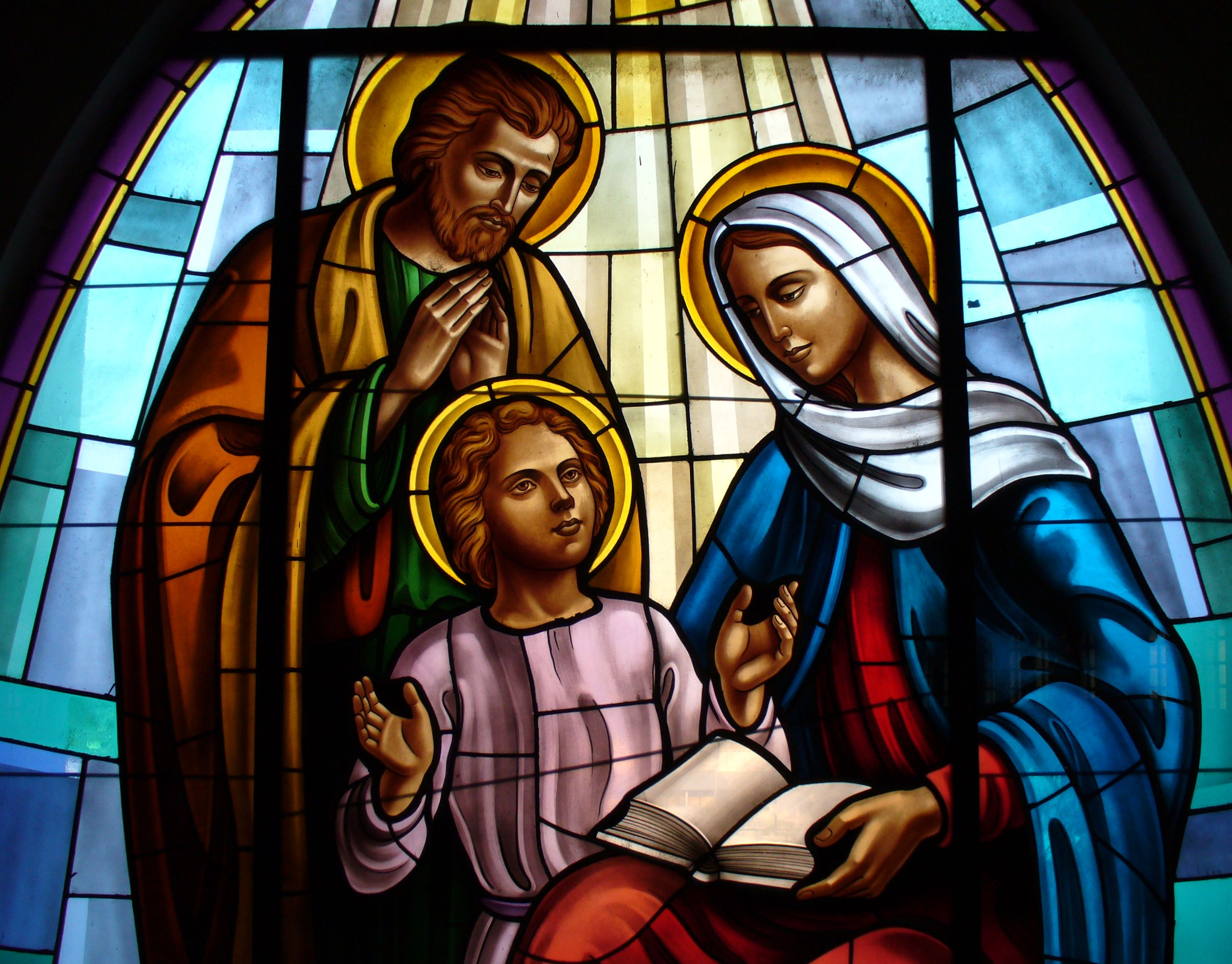
Church window

== See also ==
- Catholic Church in Timor-Leste
