= St. Anthony Cathedral, Baucau =

Coordinates: 8.4619°S 126.4538°E

St. Anthony Cathedral
- Catedral de Santo Antonio de Baucau
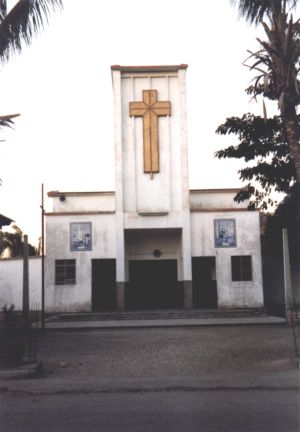
- St. Anthony Cathedral
- Location: Baucau
- Country: East Timor
- Denomination: Roman Catholic Church

Clergy
- Bishop: Basilio do Nascimento

The St. Anthony Cathedral (Portuguese: Catedral de Santo Antonio de Baucau), or just Baucau Cathedral, is a religious building that is located in the town of Baucau, in the north part of the Asian country of East Timor. The cathedral is in the Vila Salazar neighbourhood, to the north of Baucau.

The building serves as the headquarters of the Roman Catholic Diocese of Baucau (Dioecesis Baucanus or Diocese de Baucau) which was created in 1996 by bull Quo aptius consuleretur of Pope John Paul II. It is located in the old town, in Suco Buruma. The temple follows the Roman or Latin rite and is under the pastoral responsibility of the Bishop Basilio do Nascimento.

== Building ==
Located on the front of the cathedral on the sides there are two images, in white and blue, simply called tiles. The image on the left shows Mary, the right to the patron saint of the cathedral, St. Anthony of Padua, with the child Jesus in her arms. The bell tower rises above the entrance portal.

== See also ==
- Roman Catholicism in East Timor
- Saint Anthony Cathedral Basilica

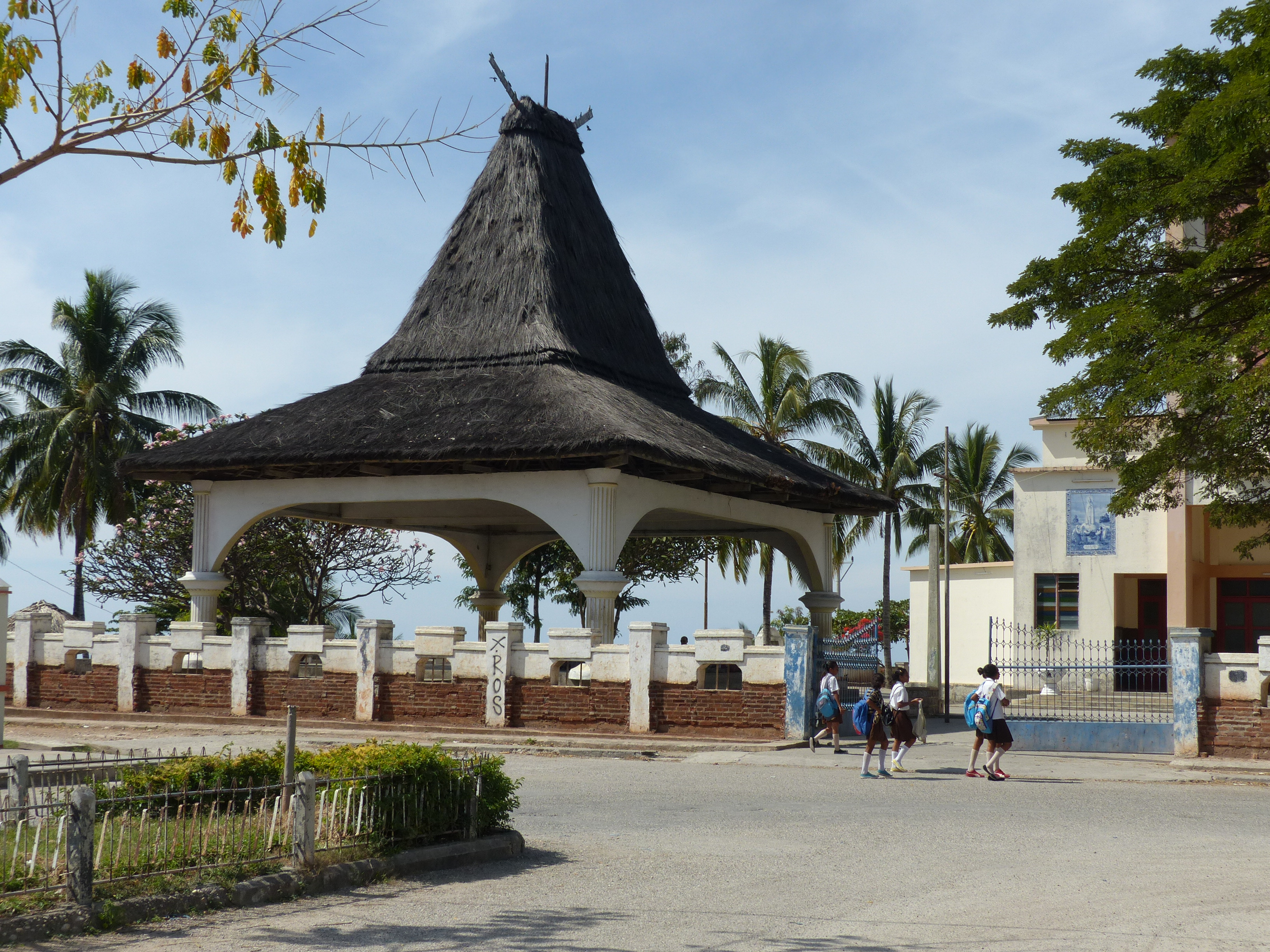
Esplanade of the Cathedral of Baucau
