= Martinho da Costa Lopes =

East Timorese religious and political leader

Martinho da Costa Lopes (11 November 1918 – 27 February 1991) was an East Timorese religious and political leader. He was a priest of the Catholic Church, the highest-ranking official of the Church in East Timor from 1977 to 1983, and a member of the National Assembly in Lisbon.

== Biography ==
Martinho da Costa Lopes was born on 11 November 1918 in the Manatuto district of Portuguese Timor. He grew up in an era when the Portuguese church, in what was then Portuguese Timor, cooperated closely with the Portuguese colonial government. He attended the Minor Seminary of Nossa Senhora de Fátima in Soibada from 1935 to 1938 and then spent two years at the minor seminary in Macau and six years at the major seminary there. He returned to East Timor in September 1946 to teach at Colégio de S. Francisco Xavier and Colégio-Liceu Dr. Francisco Machado. He was ordained a priest on 18 April 1948. He then took up pastoral assignments in Bobonaro.

By 1975 he was vicar general of Diocese of Dili, the principal assistant of the bishop, José Joaquim Ribeiro. (Note: Though Ribeiro had no sympathy for separatist politics that would end the identification of the government and the Church, he played a neutral role as rival parties sought to control East Timor after Portugal announced its intention to end its colonial rule.) The two of them joined in opposition to the Indonesian invasion of December 1975 and Ribeiro showed courage in communicating his views to foreign reporters, but he found himself close to nervous collapse by late 1977.

He also knew that the post-colonial world offered no role for a European-born bishop like himself. His request to be allowed to retire was granted by Pope Paul VI on 22 October 1977. Lopes, at the age of 58, was named apostolic administrator of the diocese, the highest-ranking Church official in Portuguese Timor, heading the region's only diocese, though not given the rank of bishop. The Diocese of Díli had once been part of the ecclesiastical hierarchy that mirrored that of Portugal's colonies, but on 1 January 1976 had been given exempt status, making it directly subject to the pope. Some 25-30% of the population of East Timor was Catholic in 1975, but the Vatican and its nuncio to Indonesia were equally concerned for the Catholics who formed a far smaller percentage of the population of Muslim-majority Indonesia.

Over the next several years, "he was an outspoken critic of human rights violations in his native East Timor. His calls for intervention by the United Nations or for curtailment of United States military aid to the Indonesian Government went unheeded."

In 1981, the country's lingua franca, the Tetum language, was made an official language of the Catholic liturgy in East Timor in place of Indonesian.

He initially raised allegations of atrocities and starvation with the Indonesian military in private without success. Beginning in 1981, he waged a public campaign by writing letters to overseas contacts and allowing them to be published in newspapers. In particular, he criticised the forced conscription of 50,000 men and boys to form a human chain to help crush the Fretilin resistance, and he denounced the Indonesian army for the massacre of 500 women and children at the Shrine of St Anthony at Lacluta in September 1981.

He was reprimanded by the military and infuriated President Suharto. Never before had an East Timorese so publicly exposed and humiliated the Indonesian Armed Forces. His response was: "I feel the irrepressible need to tell the whole world about the genocide being practised in Timor so that, when we die, at least the world will know we died standing."

Meanwhile, he continued to highlight the evidence of massive starvation in the resettlement camps and gave his support to his priests who sought to stand alongside the people. He sought a private audience with the pope without success.

In a letter to Australia, he accused the Indonesian military of mass murder, and anticipated widespread famine unless large food supplies were urgently imported. His predictions were proved correct.

After Lopes wrote to Australian officials in late 1981 to warn of an impending famine, Gough Whitlam, former Australian prime minister, a longtime advocate of Indonesian control of East Timor, visited East Timor in March 1982, met with Lopes, and disputed his claims.

== Retirement and death ==
Government officials complained to the Vatican that Lopes' sermons were "inciting nationalist sentiment". A 2006 report of the Australian government said that former Australian Prime Minister Gough Whitlam played an "instrumental" role in the campaign for Lopes' removal as well. Pope John Paul removed Lopes as administrator in May 1983.

Since he was not a bishop, he served at the sufferance of the pope and had no recourse. Many Timorese clergy wrote to the Vatican to protest his removal. He continued to campaign on behalf of the Timorese, mobilizing support worldwide on the basis of universal human rights to counterbalance the anticolonial rhetoric of guerillas resisting the Indonesian. He settled in Alges, Portugal. He died in a Lisbon hospital on 27 February 1991.

His name remains associated with a historic re-orientation of the Timorese church towards local culture. During the years he led the diocese, the Church, re-oriented from a Portuguese colonial viewpoint to the service of the indigenous population, grew in numbers not seen during centuries of Portuguese missionary activity.

Lopes was succeeded as Apostolic Administrator by Carlos Felipe Ximenes Belo in 1988.
