= Virgílio do Carmo da Silva =

Timorese Catholic cardinal (born 1967)

His Eminence Virgílio do Carmo da Silva SDB
- Cardinal, Archbishop of Díli
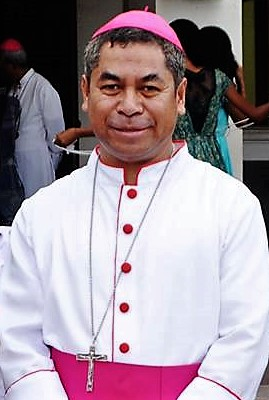
- do Carmo da Silva in 2017
- Church: Roman Catholic Church
- Archdiocese: Dili
- Province: Díli
- Appointed: 11 September 2019
- Predecessor: Himself; (as Bishop); Alberto Ricardo da Silva; (as previous Bishop)
- Other posts: Vice President, Episcopal Conference of Timor Leste
- Previous posts: Bishop of Dili; (2016–2019)

Orders
- Ordination: 8 December 1998
- Consecration: 19 March 2016 by Joseph Marino
- Created cardinal: 27 August 2022 by Pope Francis
- Rank: Cardinal-Priest of Sant'Alberto Magno

Personal details
- Born: Virgílio do Carmo da Silva; 27 November 1967 (age 58): Venilale, Portuguese Timor; (now Timor-Leste)
- Denomination: Roman Catholic
- Education: Salesian Pontifical University
- Motto: Caritas Christi urget nos; ('The love of Christ inspires us')
- Coat of arms

Ordination history
History
Priestly ordination
- Date: 18 December 1998
- Place: Parañaque
Episcopal consecration
- Consecrated by: Joseph Marino
- Date: 19 March 2016
- Place: Dili

Styles of Virgílio do Carmo da Silva
- Reference style: His Eminence
- Spoken style: Your Eminence
- Religious style: Cardinal
- Informal style: Cardinal

Virgílio do Carmo da Silva, SDB (born 27 November 1967) is a Timorese Catholic prelate who was appointed Bishop of Dili on 30 January 2016. He became an archbishop when the diocese was elevated in 2019.

Prior to his appointment to the episcopacy, he held various offices with the Society of St. Francis de Sales (the Salesians of Don Bosco).

On 27 August 2022, Pope Francis made him a cardinal, the first from Timor-Leste.

== Early life and education ==
Do Carmo da Silva was born in Venilale, in the then Baucau District, Portuguese Timor (now Timor-Leste), and is a son of José do Carmo and Isabel da Silva. He has a younger brother, Gui do Carmo da Silva; both are Salesian priests.

Do Carmo da Silva attended Salesian primary and secondary schools in Fatumaca, Baucau District. In August 2022, shortly before being created and proclaimed cardinal priest, he told Vatican News:

"... when I finished elementary school, I really wished to go to junior high school and the only one by me was run by the Salesians, for those aspiring to be future Salesians. When I approached the Salesians, they were so kind, accepting me to stay and study there. I gradually discovered my Salesian, as well as priestly, vocation."

In 1983, he made his aspirancy, pre-Seminary, in Fatumaca, and in 1989–1990 he entered the novitiate, also in Fatumaca. On 31 May 1990, he took his first vows (first profession), with the Salesians. He then studied in the Philippines, taking courses in philosophy in Canlubang and in theology in Parañaque.

On 19 March 1997, he made his final vows (permanent or "perpetual" profession).

== Ministry ==
=== Salesian service ===
Do Carmo da Silva was ordained as a priest in Parañaque on 8 December 1998.

From 1999 to 2002, he was a formator of aspirant for the Salesians. He then served in 2002 and 2005 as bursar of the formation house in Venilale and as parish vicar.

Between 2005 and 2007, he studied in Rome for a licentiate in spirituality at the Salesian Pontifical University.

Following his return to Timor-Leste, he served from 2007 to 2014 as novice master for the Salesians. Between 2009 and 2014, he was also director of the Salesian House and the Don Bosco Technical High School in Fatumaca.

In 2015, he was selected as provincial superior of the Salesians in Timor-Leste and Indonesia.

=== Episcopacy ===
On 30 January 2016, Pope Francis appointed him bishop of Díli. He replaced Bishop Alberto Ricardo da Silva, who had died of brain cancer the previous April.

He received his episcopal consecration on 19 March 2016 from Archbishop Joseph Marino, Apostolic Nuncio to Timor-Leste, assisted by Bishops Basílio do Nascimento of Baucau and Norberto do Amaral of Maliana. Government officials, including President Taur Matan Ruak, sent congratulations, marking the end of years of contentious relations between the government and religious leaders.

In April 2018, do Carmo da Silva spoke in support of the launch by the Catholic Church and the government of Timor-Leste of a campaign to promote inbound spiritual pilgrimages. In his view, it was time for the church and government to unite and develop forms of religious tourism. "Sacred places are not only bringing people closer to God. They also have economic and cultural values," he said. He also asked his diocese's parish priests to collaborate with those who maintained the country's religious sites, not merely to keep them clean, but also to give visiting pilgrims peace of mind.

The following month, police in Díli were placed on high alert after learning of potential attacks by Islamic extremists on churches as well as do Carmo da Silva, after the recent elections in the country.

On 11 September 2019, Pope Francis created the ecclesiastical province of Díli, making Díli a metropolitan archdiocese, and appointed do Carmo da Silva as the archdiocese's and Timor-Leste's first archbishop.

With his background as an educator, do Carmo da Silva has worked closely with the Timorese government in an effort to improve the country's educational opportunities and its quality of education. As Timor-Leste has a very young population (with an average age in 2020 of only 20.8 years), he has also emphasised the task of educating and forming young people in the Catholic faith.

On 8 December 2021, do Carmo da Silva combined with Prime Minister Taur Matan Ruak to inaugurate Timor-Leste's first Catholic university, dedicated to John Paul II, the establishment of which fulfilled a long-term goal of the archdiocese.

Do Carmo da Silva has also sometimes commented on more general political matters. For example, in the lead up to the 19 April 2022 presidential election in Timor-Leste, he called on the eventual winner to "keep his election promises so that the people do not lose confidence" and to "be close to the people not only during the campaign, but also during the term of office, so he can know the difficulties faced by the citizens." He also urged Timorese to "uphold the Constitution" and work together in converting their nation "into a peaceful, prosperous and democratic society".

On 29 May 2022, Pope Francis announced he would appoint do Carmo da Silva as a cardinal, the first such official from Timor-Leste. Do Carmo da Silva was surprised to hear that he was among the 21 new cardinals Pope Francis had decided to elevate. "I am convinced that Pope Francis did not offer this to me, Virgilio, but rather to the Church and the people of Timor-Leste," he said at a news conference the following day. He continued:

"The people and the Church of Timor-Leste deserve this grace and recognition from God, in a country where the Gospel arrived 500 years ago and which celebrated the 20th anniversary of its independence on May 20."

During a papal consistory on 27 August 2022, Pope Francis created and proclaimed him cardinal priest, assigning him the title of Sant'Alberto Magno. At the age of 54, he became the second youngest cardinal, after Bishop Giorgio Marengo, 48, Apostolic Prefect of Ulaanbaatar in Mongolia. Four days later, on 31 August 2022, he, together with Timorese from various countries, and a group of Indonesians, participated in a Eucharistic Celebration of Thanksgiving in the Tetum language at the Chapel of the Pontifical Urban University, with the ambassador of Timor-Leste to Italy and other civil officials also being present.

That week, he also told an interviewer that Timor-Leste's having a Catholic majority had eased reconciliation with Indonesia after Timor-Leste's independence was restored in 2002. He praised Timor-Leste's adoption earlier in 2022 of the Document on Human Fraternity signed by Pope Francis and Ahmed el-Tayeb in 2019. He also noted that the country's efforts to promote religious tourism include representatives of other religions, that there was already a large mosque in Dili and a large Hindu temple was under construction.

In early September 2022, the new cardinal visited the headquarters of the Portuguese Province of the Salesians, in Lisbon, where he was received by the provincial superior and by the acting director of the Salesians in Lisbon.

He participated as a cardinal elector in the 2025 papal conclave that elected Pope Leo XIV.

== See also ==
- Cardinals created by Pope Francis

Catholic Church titles
Preceded by Alberto Ricardo da Silva	Bishop of Díli; 2016–2019	Elevated to Archbishop
New title	Archbishop of Díli; 2019–present	Incumbent
