= Basílio do Nascimento =

Roman Catholic bishop of Baucau, East Timor (1950–2021)

The Most Reverend Basílio do Nascimento
- Bishop of Baucau
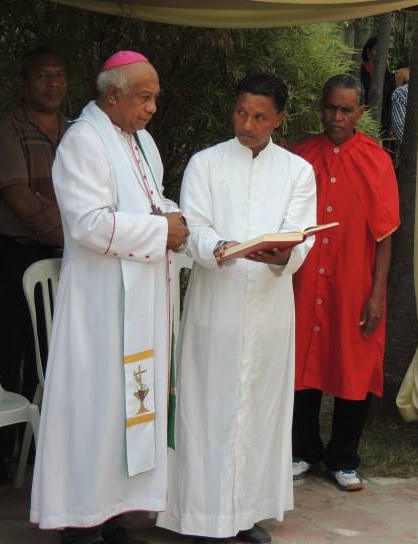
- Nascimento (left) in 2015
- Church: Roman Catholic Church
- Province: Díli; (from 11 September 2019)
- Diocese: Baucau
- Appointed: 6 March 2004
- Term ended: 30 October 2021
- Predecessor: Office established
- Successor: Leandro Maria Alves
- Other posts: President, Episcopal Conference of Timor-Leste; (2012–2019)
- Previous posts: Titular Bishop of Septimunicia; (1996–2004); Apostolic Administrator of Baucau; (1996–2004); Apostolic Administrator of Dili; (2002–04; 2015–16)

Orders
- Ordination: 25 June 1977 by David de Sousa
- Consecration: 6 January 1997 by Pope John Paul II

Personal details
- Born: Basílio do Nascimento; 14 June 1950: Suai, Portuguese Timor; (now East Timor)
- Died: 30 October 2021 (aged 71) Dili, East Timor
- Denomination: Roman Catholic
- Education: Institut Catholique de Paris
- Motto: Et vocem Spiritu Sancto; ("The voice of the Holy Spirit")

Basílio do Nascimento Martins (14 June 1950 – 30 October 2021) was the East Timorese Roman Catholic Bishop of Baucau.

He was born in Suai, then Portuguese Timor. He later moved to Portugal, where he was ordained as a priest in Évora, in 1977. He worked for 20 years in Portugal and France before returning home in 1994, which was at the time under Indonesian occupation.

He became apostolic administrator of the new Diocese of Baucau on 30 November 1996 and titular bishop on 6 January 1997. When Carlos Filipe Ximenes Belo retired, Nascimento became apostolic administrator of the Diocese of Dili, until the new Bishop of Dili, Alberto Ricardo da Silva, was installed on 6 March 2004. Nascimento then became the Bishop of Baucau.

In October 1999, the President of the National Council of Timorese Resistance Xanana Gusmão thanked Bishop Nascimento for the support of the Church in the struggle for independence.

Concerned that the names of the thousands of lives lost during Indonesia's occupation of the country will be forgotten in the name of reconciliation with Indonesia, on 21 January 2006 he said that reconciliation with Jakarta without justice is meaningless.

From the establishment of the Episcopal Conference of Timor-Leste (CET) in April 2012 until 2019, Nascimento served as its inaugural President.

On 31 March 2018, Nascimento collapsed during Mass at St. Anthony's Cathedral in Baucau and was rushed to Dili National Hospital. He recovered and was discharged on 4 April 2018. He was the head of the East Timorese Bishops' conference.

Bishop do Nascimento died from a heart attack on 30 October 2021, in the Guido Valadares National Hospital in Dili. The President of East Timor Francisco Guterres awarded Nascimento with the country's highest honour, the Order of Timor-Leste.

== Honours ==
Ribbon	Award	Date awarded	Notes
	Grand Cross of the Order of Liberty, Portugal	7 December 1999	
	Collar of the Order of Timor-Leste	1 November 2021 (posthumous)	

Catholic Church titles
New title	Apostolic Administrator of Baucau; 1996–2004	Succeeded by Himself as Bishop of Baucau
Preceded by Carlos Filipe Ximenes Belo	Apostolic Administrator of Díli; 2002–2004	Succeeded by Alberto Ricardo da Silva as Bishop of Díli
Preceded by Himself as Apostolic Administrator of Baucau	Bishop of Baucau; 2004–2021	Succeeded by Leandro Maria Alves
Preceded by Alberto Ricardo da Silva as Bishop of Díli	Apostolic Administrator of Díli; 2015–2016	Succeeded by Virgílio do Carmo da Silva as Bishop of Díli
