= Baucau =

City in Timor-Leste

- City
- Cidade de Baucau (Portuguese); Cidade Baukau (Tetun)
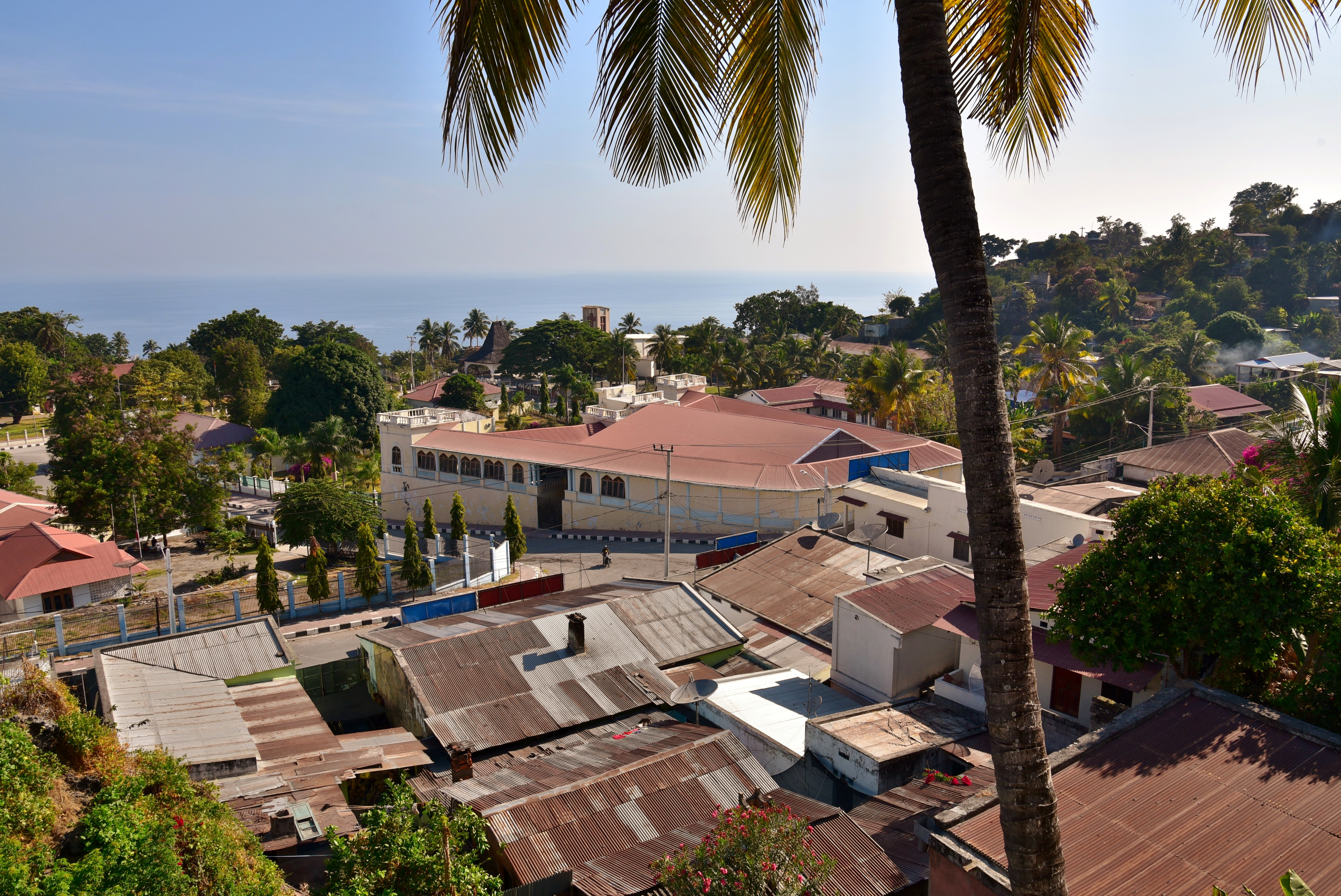
- View of the Old City, Baucau

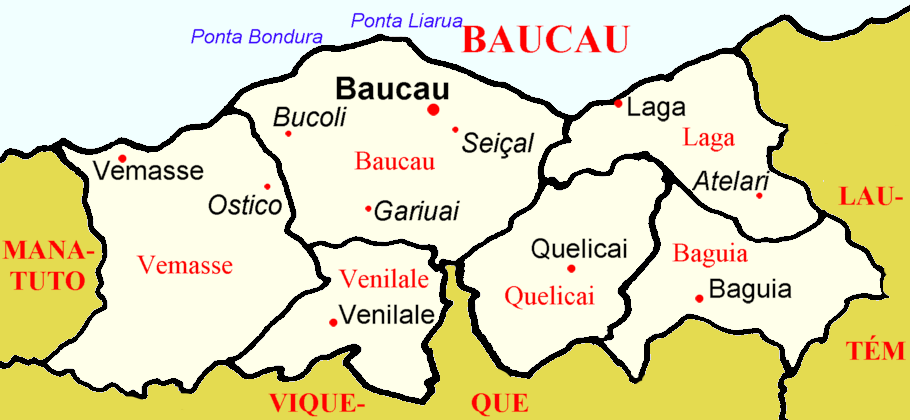
- Location in Baucau Municipality

- Location in Timor-Leste
- Coordinates: 8°27′46″S 126°27′13″E
- Country: Timor-Leste
- Municipality: Baucau
- Sucos (villages): List: 11

Area
  - Total: 369.53 km^{2} (142.68 sq mi)
- Elevation: 336 m (1,102 ft)

Population (2015)
  - Total: 14,961
  - Density: 40.487/km^{2} (104.86/sq mi)
- Time zone: UTC+09:00 (TLT)
- Climate: Aw

Baucau (Portuguese: Baucau, Tetun: Baukau) is the second-largest city in Timor-Leste, after Dili, the capital, which lies 122 km (76 mi) to its west.

Baucau has about 16,000 inhabitants, and is the capital of Baucau municipality, located in the eastern part of the country. In the times of Portuguese Timor, Baucau was little more than an overgrown village, and for part of those times was called Vila Salazar, after the Portuguese dictator António de Oliveira Salazar.

== Geography ==
The administrative post of Baucau is divided into 11 villages (sucos).

- Suco Bahú
- Suco Bucoli
- Suco Buibau
- Suco Buruma
- Suco Caibada Uaimua
- Suco Samalari
- Suco Seisal
- Suco Tirilolo
- Suco Triloka
- Suco Gariuai
- Suco Uailili

== Infrastructure ==
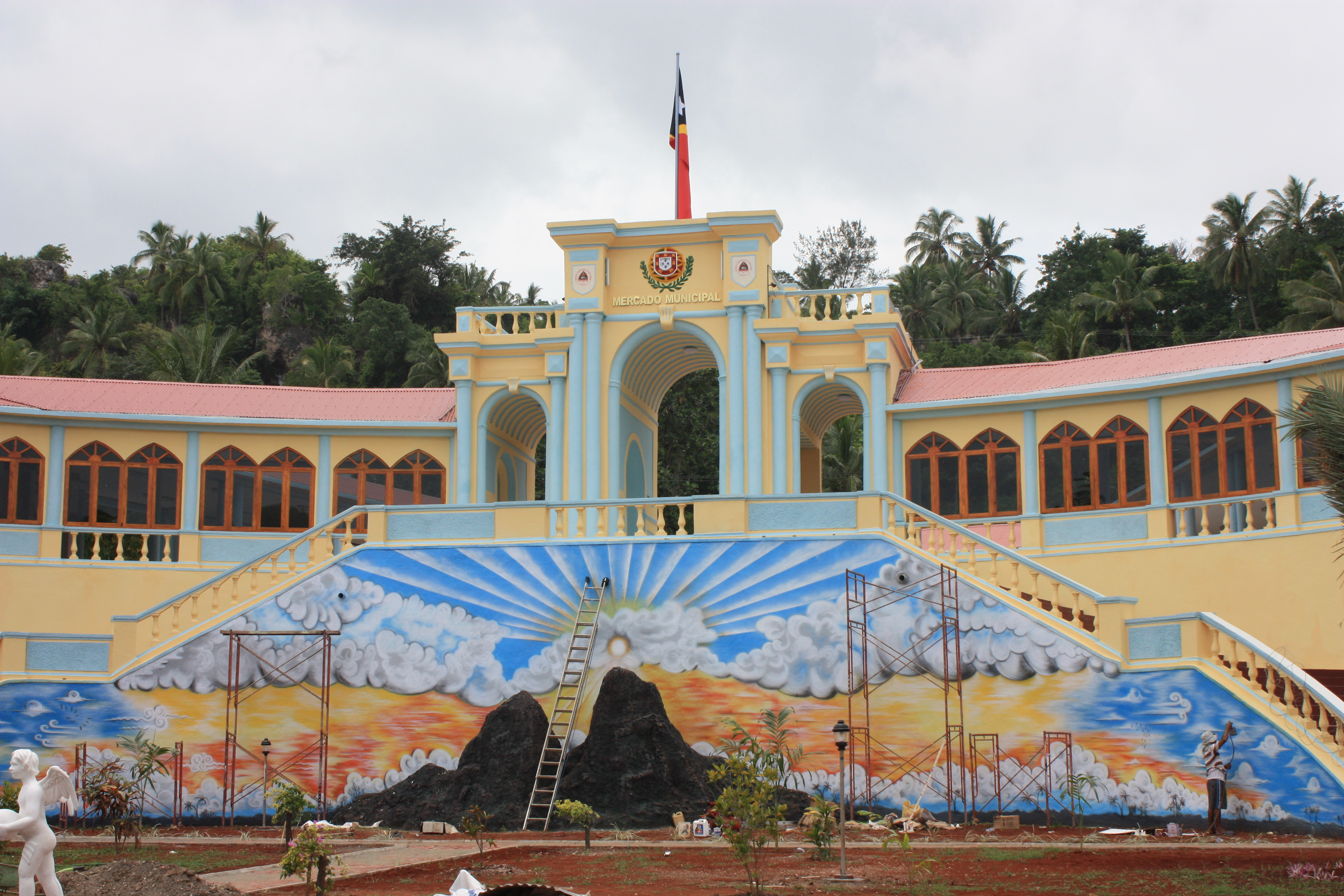
Municipal market building in Baucau

Much of the infrastructure of the city and the surrounding area was damaged or destroyed by pro-Indonesian militia during the violence that followed the referendum for independence in 1999. Nevertheless, in the old part of Baucau there survive a few relics from the Portuguese colonial era, such as large colonial houses, churches, and public buildings. One of these is the Pousada de Baucau, a large pink hotel whose restaurant has views of the ocean.

The shops, restaurants, and street market stalls (predominantly fruit and vegetable sellers) conduct business, although unemployment, particularly among the young, is very high. There are a few successful experiments that have converted old war-oriented businesses into light engineering, new businesses such as East Timor Roofing that has generated employment and training opportunities, and a number of small businesses are beginning in the areas of hygiene and health, food production and processing, transport, small retail, and tourism. The convent next to the Pousada de Baucau has a small retail outlet selling locally produced hand crafts.

The Instituto Católico para a Formação de Professores (ICFP) – the Catholic Teachers College – is owned by the diocese and is responsible for training future and untrained teachers for Timor-Leste. With more than 300 graduates teaching throughout the country, and more than 400 teachers with upgraded qualifications, ICFP is dedicated to rebuilding the country through education of future generations.

Baucau also has a hospital, a nursing school and a swimming pool owned by the Pousada de Baucau.

== Climate ==
Climate data for Baucau (1917–1963)
Month	Jan	Feb	Mar	Apr	May	Jun	Jul	Aug	Sep	Oct	Nov	Dec	Year
Record high °C (°F)	36.0 (96.8)	35.0 (95.0)	34.0 (93.2)	36.0 (96.8)	35.0 (95.0)	35.0 (95.0)	35.0 (95.0)	35.0 (95.0)	38.0 (100.4)	37.0 (98.6)	37.0 (98.6)	36.0 (96.8)	38.0 (100.4)
Mean daily maximum °C (°F)	27.5 (81.5)	27.3 (81.1)	28.2 (82.8)	28.8 (83.8)	28.4 (83.1)	27.8 (82.0)	27.6 (81.7)	28.2 (82.8)	29.4 (84.9)	30.1 (86.2)	30.2 (86.4)	28.8 (83.8)	28.5 (83.3)
Daily mean °C (°F)	23.8 (74.8)	23.6 (74.5)	24.1 (75.4)	24.1 (75.4)	23.9 (75.0)	23.0 (73.4)	22.8 (73.0)	23.1 (73.6)	24.0 (75.2)	25.6 (78.1)	25.7 (78.3)	24.8 (76.6)	24.0 (75.2)
Mean daily minimum °C (°F)	22.0 (71.6)	21.5 (70.7)	20.9 (69.6)	20.7 (69.3)	20.5 (68.9)	19.6 (67.3)	19.1 (66.4)	18.5 (65.3)	18.5 (65.3)	17.8 (64.0)	20.9 (69.6)	21.5 (70.7)	20.1 (68.2)
Record low °C (°F)	17.3 (63.1)	16.4 (61.5)	16.1 (61.0)	14.4 (57.9)	13.8 (56.8)	13.3 (55.9)	12.2 (54.0)	13.2 (55.8)	13.2 (55.8)	14.7 (58.5)	17.2 (63.0)	16.9 (62.4)	12.2 (54.0)
Average rainfall mm (inches)	213.2 (8.39)	220.7 (8.69)	152.3 (6.00)	153.7 (6.05)	95.5 (3.76)	37.9 (1.49)	19.5 (0.77)	10.6 (0.42)	4.8 (0.19)	7.2 (0.28)	76.4 (3.01)	186.0 (7.32)	1,177.8 (46.37)
Average rainy days (≥ 0.1 mm)	20	17	16	15	10	6	4	2	0	1	7	15	113
Average relative humidity (%)	84	87	80	77	71	67	63	56	55	58	67	78	70
Mean monthly sunshine hours	158.1	149.7	213.9	207.0	251.1	228.0	263.5	297.6	300.0	313.1	303.0	204.6	2,889.6
Mean daily sunshine hours	5.1	5.3	6.9	6.9	8.1	7.6	8.5	9.8	10.0	10.1	10.1	6.6	7.9
Source: Deutscher Wetterdienst

== Religion ==
Baucau is the seat of the Roman Catholic Diocese of Baucau, one of the three bishoprics in Timor-Leste. It was founded on 30 November 1996, when the bishopric in Dili split. Its bishop is Basilio do Nascimento.

== Transportation ==
Six kilometers from the city lies the Cakung Airport (code IATA: BCH), a.k.a. LANUD for the local people. It has what is currently the country's longest airport runway, as Dili's Lobato International Airport can only serve small aircraft like the Boeing 737. It served as the country's principal airport before the Indonesian invasion in 1975, when it was taken over by the Indonesian military.

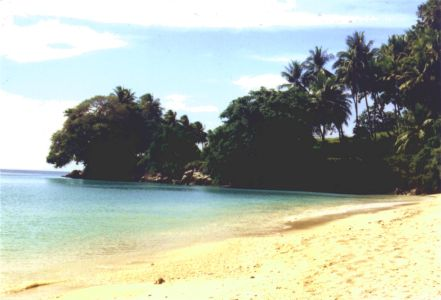
The beach in Baucau

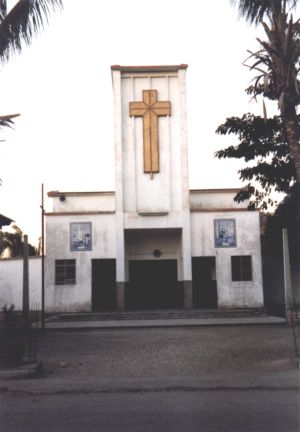
Church of Baucau

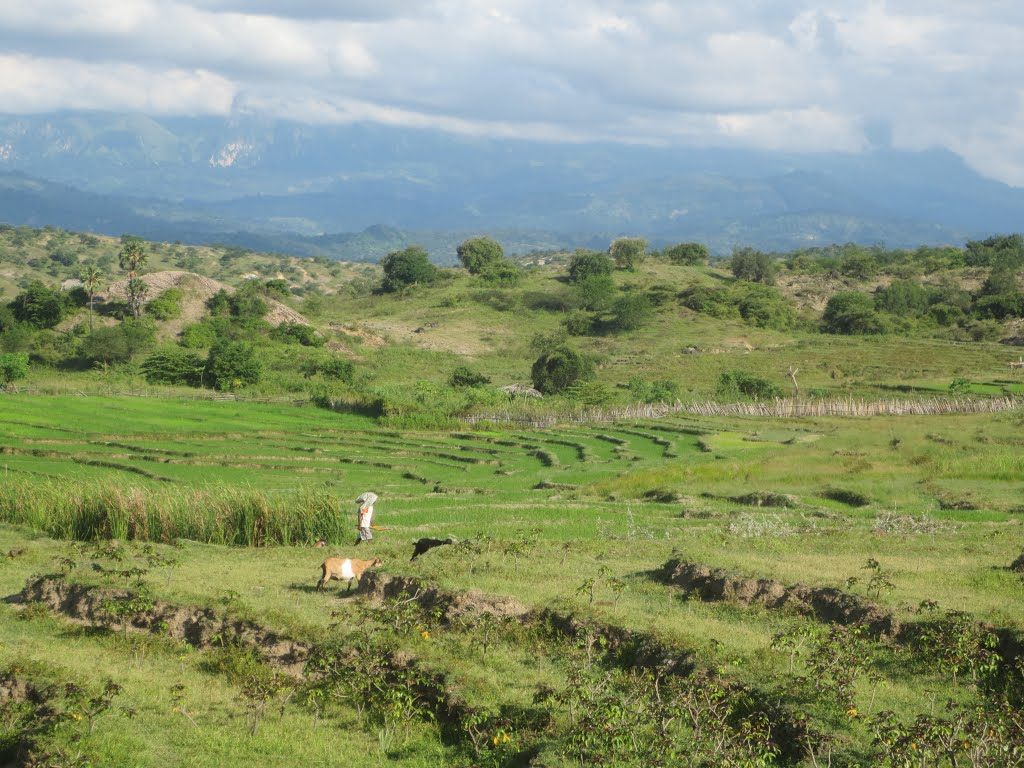
Fields of Baucau area

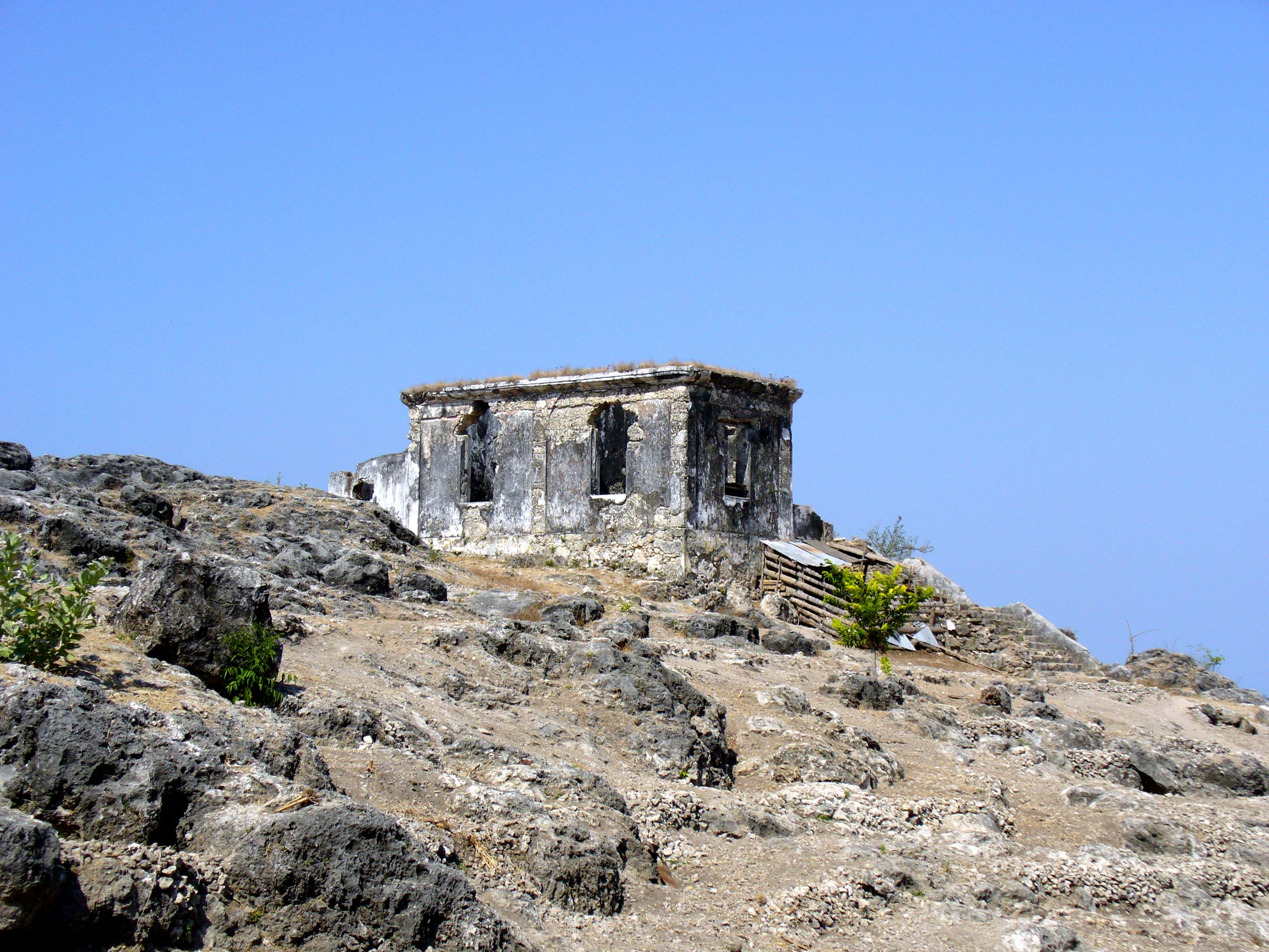
Colonial building

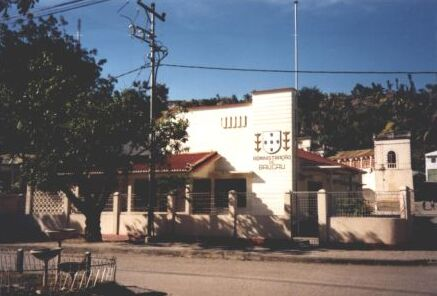
Administration building

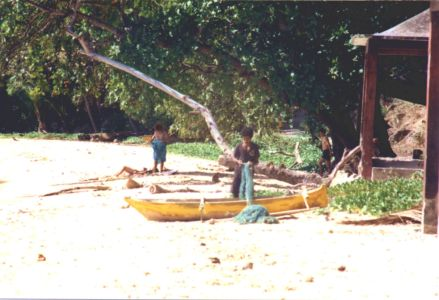
Fisher on the beach

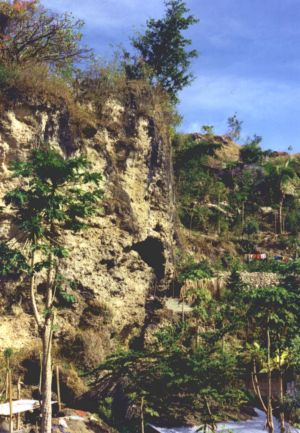
Upper part of Baucau city

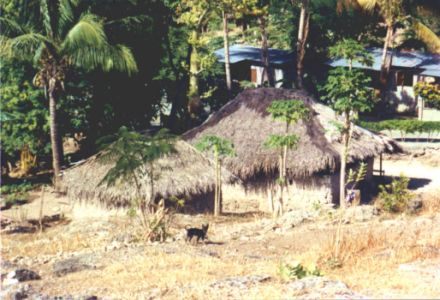
Huts in the lower part

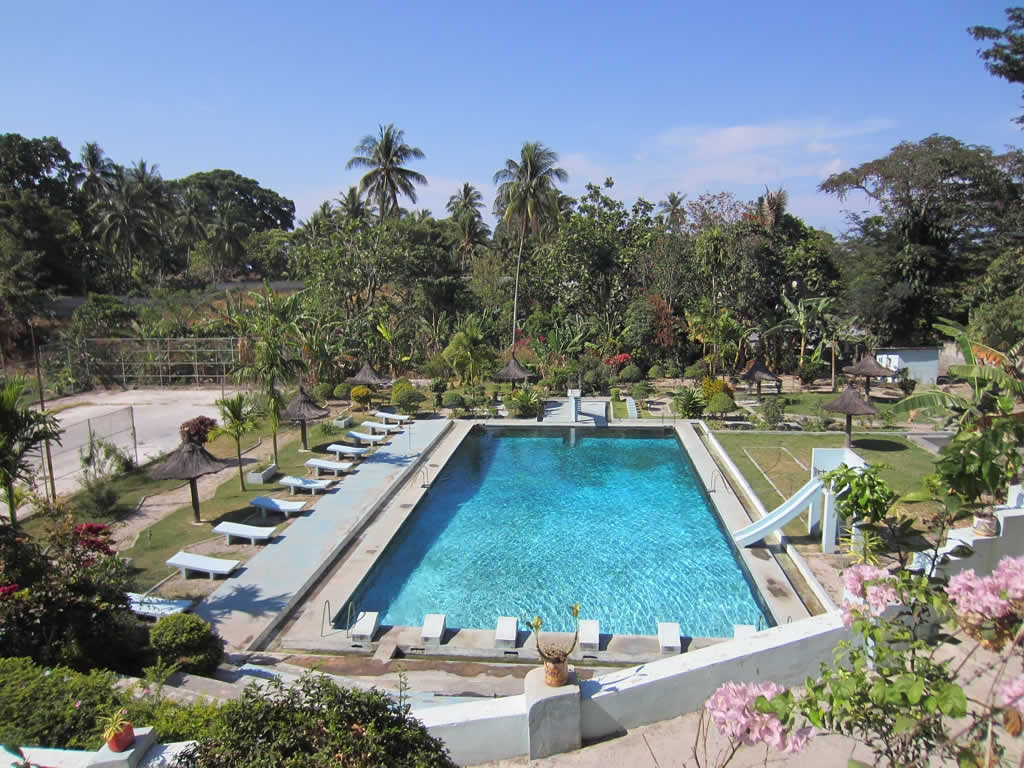
Public pool in Baucau

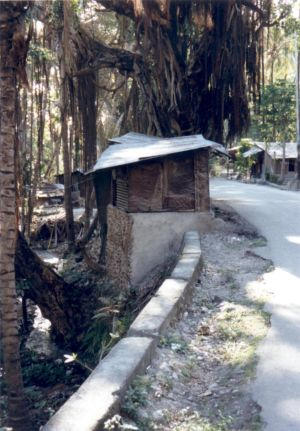
Street from city center to the beach

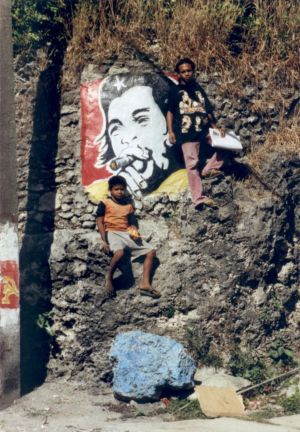
Wall painting

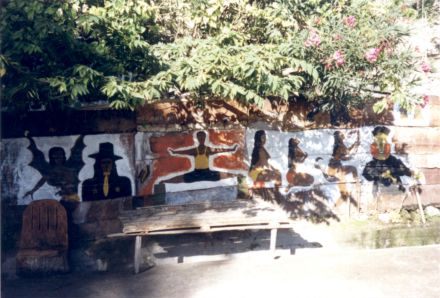
Wall painting
