= Carlos Filipe Ximenes Belo =

Roman Catholic bishop (born 1948)

The Most Reverend Carlos Filipe Ximenes Belo SDB
- Apostolic Administrator Emeritus of Díli; Titular Bishop of Lorium
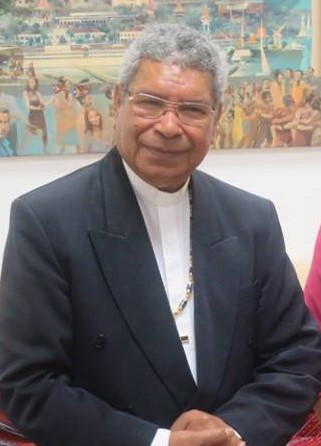
- Belo in 2016
- Church: Latin Church
- See: Lorium (titular see)
- Appointed: 21 March 1988
- Previous posts: Apostolic Administrator of Dili; (1988–2002)

Orders
- Ordination: 26 July 1980 by José Policarpo
- Consecration: 19 June 1988 by Francesco Canalini

Personal details
- Born: 3 February 1948 (age 78): Vemasse, Baucau, Portuguese Timor; (now Timor-Leste)
- Residence: Maputo, Mozambique
- Parents: Domingos Vaz Filipe; Ermelinda Baptista Filipe
- Education: Catholic University of Portugal; Salesian Pontifical University
- Motto: Caritas Veritatis-Veritas Caritatis
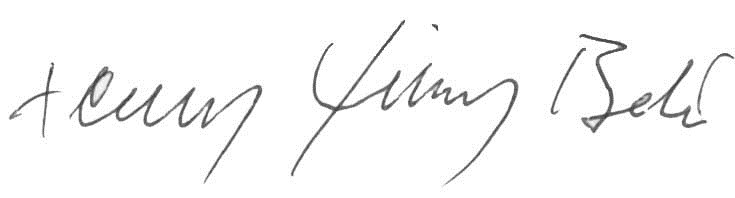
- Signature: Carlos Filipe Ximenes Belo's signature

Styles of Carlos Ximenes Belo
- Reference style: The Most Reverend
- Spoken style: Your Excellency
- Religious style: Monsignor

Carlos Filipe Ximenes Belo, SDB, commonly known as Carlos Belo or Ximenes Belo (Portuguese: [ˈkaɾluʃ fiˈlipɨ ʃiˈmenɨʃ ˈbɛlu]; born 3 February 1948) is an East Timorese prelate of the Catholic Church. He became a bishop in 1988 and served as the apostolic administrator of the Diocese of Díli from 1988 to 2002. In 1996, he shared the Nobel Peace Prize with José Ramos-Horta for working "towards a just and peaceful solution to the conflict in East Timor". He is a professed member of the Salesians.

== Early life and religious vocation ==
Carlos Filipe Ximenes Belo was the fifth child of Domingos Vaz Filipe and Ermelinda Baptista Filipe, born in the village of Wailakama, near Vemasse, on the north coast of Portuguese Timor. His father, a schoolteacher, died two years after Belo was born. He attended Catholic schools at Baucau and Ossu and then entered the minor seminary in Dare outside Dili, graduating in 1968. From 1969 until 1981, apart from periods of practical training in East Timor and Macau from 1974 to 1976, Belo studied philosophy at the Catholic University of Portugal and the Salesian Pontifical University.

Belo took his final vows as a member of the Salesian Society on 6 October 1974 and was ordained a priest on 26 July 1980. He returned to East Timor in 1981, taking Indonesian citizenship as required since Indonesia had invaded East Timor following the Carnation Revolution. Belo became a teacher for 20 months and later director for two months at the Salesian College at Fatumaca.

== Apostolic administrator ==
After Monsignor Martinho da Costa Lopes was removed as apostolic administrator in 1983, his position remained vacant until Belo was appointed titular bishop of Lorium and apostolic administrator of the Diocese of Dili, the senior official of the Catholic Church in East Timor, on 21 March 1988. On 19 June 1988, he was consecrated a bishop by the Apostolic Nuncio to Indonesia, Archbishop Francesco Canalini. He chose as his episcopal motto Caritas Veritatis-Veritas Caritatis.

Belo continued on Lopes' path and after five months of taking office he preached a sermon that denounced the Kraras massacre of 1983 and condemned the many Indonesian arrests. He undertook a program of overseas contacts to counter the world's ignorance of the violence in East Timor.

In February 1989 he wrote to the president of Portugal, the pope, and the secretary-general of the United Nations calling for the UN to sponsor and oversee a referendum on the future of East Timor and for international assistance for the East Timorese, who were "dying as a people and a nation". This appeal to the UN became public in April. He further antagonized Indonesian authorities when he gave sanctuary in his own home to youths escaping the Santa Cruz massacre in 1991 and endeavoured to expose how many were killed.

Belo's labours on behalf of the East Timorese and in pursuit of peace and reconciliation were recognised when, along with José Ramos-Horta, he was awarded the Nobel Peace Prize on 10 December 1996. (Note: Their selection as recipients of the Nobel Peace Prize was announced on 12 October 1996.) Belo capitalised upon this honour by meeting with a variety of world leaders, including US President Bill Clinton and Nelson Mandela of South Africa.

Following Timor-Leste's independence on 20 May 2002, Belo went to Portugal for several months of medical treatment. He later said he was "suffering from both physical and mental fatigue that will require a long period of recuperation". He and Bishop Basílio do Nascimento, the administrator of another diocese in Timor-Leste, met privately with the pope on 28 October 2002. Pope John Paul II accepted his resignation as Apostolic Administrator of Dili on 26 November 2002. Nascimento was named to succeed him. The Vatican announcement did not explain his retirement at the age of 54, but cited the provision of canon law that allows a bishop to retire for grave reasons or health problems.

== Later activity ==
Following his resignation Belo travelled to Portugal where he said he underwent medical treatment for cancer.

By the beginning of 2004, there were repeated calls for him to return to Timor-Leste to run for president. In May 2004 he told Portuguese state-run television RTP that he had "decided to leave politics to politicians".

Belo started working in the Diocese of Maputo in Mozambique in June 2004 and described his role as "assistant parish priest": "I do pastoral work by teaching catechism to children, giving retreats to young people. I have descended from the top to the bottom." He told an interviewer that he had left Díli because the new political situation required new leadership that could undertake the work of reconciliation without the associations he had with earlier battles. He said he had chosen Mozambique because he did not think he could learn another language and that he had consulted his Salesian superior and Cardinal Crescenzio Sepe, who headed the Curia department responsible for missionary territory. He planned to stay for a year. In 2024 The New York Times reported that Belo was "said to be working as a priest in Mozambique".

== Other awards ==
In 1995, he received the John Humphrey Freedom Award from the Canadian human rights group Rights & Democracy.

On 3 August 1988 he received the Grand Cross of the Order of Liberty from the government of Portugal.

In 2004 he was awarded an honorary doctorate by CEU Cardinal Herrera University.

He was named the Lusophonic Personality of the Year 2010 by the International Lusophone Movement of the Lisbon Academy of Sciences.

== Sexual abuse allegations ==
On 28 September 2022, De Groene Amsterdammer, a Dutch magazine, reported that two men alleged Belo sexually abused them and others as children in East Timor. The magazine's research indicated that Belo sexually abused male children before and during his tenure as a bishop, both in Fatumaca and Díli. The next day a Vatican spokesperson confirmed that Church officials had imposed disciplinary sanctions against Belo in 2020 less than a year after receiving allegations in 2019 about his behavior in East Timor years earlier. These included restrictions on Belo's movements and the exercise of his ministry as well as prohibiting him from having contact with children. He was also forbidden to have any contact with East Timor. The Vatican "modified and reinforced" its disciplinary actions in 2021. Its spokesman said that Belo accepted these rules in both years.

== See also ==
- List of peace activists

== Notes ==
Catholic Church titles
Preceded by Martinho da Costa Lopes	Apostolic Administrator of Díli; 1988–2002	Succeeded by Basílio do Nascimento
