= Diocese of Baucau =

Roman Catholic diocese in East Timor

Coordinates: 8.4619°S 126.4540°E

Diocese of Baucau Dioecesis Baucanus Diocese de Baucau Dioseze Baukau

catholic
- Seal of the Diocese of Baucau

Location
- Country: Timor-Leste
- Territory: Baucau, Lautém, Manatuto, and Viqueque municipalities
- Metropolitan: Archdiocese of Dili

Statistics
- Area: 6,987 km^{2} (2,698 sq mi)
- Population: Total; Catholics: (as of 2012); 366,000; 351,000 (95.9%)
- Parishes: 22

Information
- Denomination: Catholic Church
- Sui iuris church: Latin Church
- Rite: Roman Rite
- Cathedral: St. Anthony Cathedral

Current leadership
- Pope: Leo XIV
- Bishop: Leandro Maria Alves
- Vicar General: Francisco Pinheiro da Silva

Map
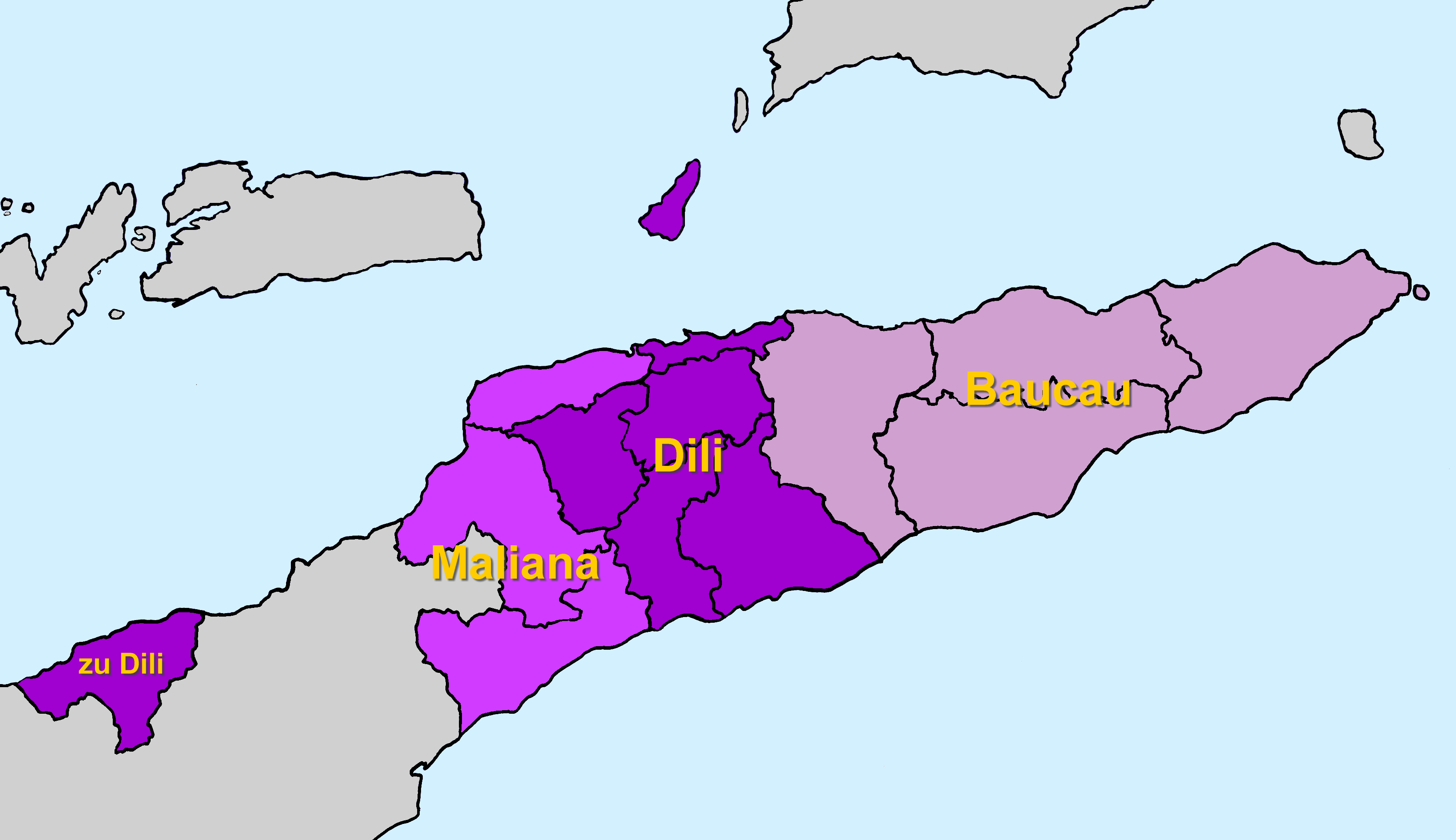
- Location of the diocese within Timor-Leste

The Roman Catholic Diocese of Baucau (Latin: Dioecesis Baucanus; Portuguese: Diocese de Baucau; Tetun: Dioseze Baukau) is a Latin Church diocese of the Catholic Church in Timor-Leste. One of three dioceses in the country, it was established in 1996 by Pope John Paul II. It serves nearly 400,000 Catholics in the municipalities of Baucau, Lautém, Manatuto, and Viqueque, covering a total area of 6,987 km^{2} (2,698 square miles). The current bishop of Baucau is Leandro Maria Alves since 2023.

The mother church of the diocese is St. Anthony Cathedral in Baucau. The diocese has 22 parishes and is served by 81 priests, 30 religious brothers, and 184 religious sisters. It operates a number of primary and secondary schools and administers health and social programs within its territory.

== History ==
- November 30, 1996: Established as the Diocese of Baucau from the Diocese of Díli

When the diocese was started there were only 21 priests plus a number of nuns from several religious congregations to serve about 200,000 Catholics. In 2018 there were 150 young men from Baucau Diocese studying in seminaries.

=== Current events ===
Bishop Basilio do Nascimento launched Radio Fini Lorosae (eastern future radio), the new radio station set up by Baucau diocese, on March 20, 2006 following a Mass held at St. Anthony Cathedral to mark the diocese's ninth anniversary. The station office is located just 100 meters from the cathedral. Baucau Vicar General Father Francisco da Silva and Father Jose Antonio, the cathedral parish priest, concelebrated the anniversary Mass.

On 19 May 2007 President Alexander Xanana Gusmão awarded the Dom Martinho da Costa Lopes Medal to Father Mario do Carmo Lemos Belo, former vicar general of the Baucau diocese and several deceased Catholic clergy and Religious in recognition of their contributions to the liberation of the country.

In 2009 the government gave US$1.5 million to two dioceses in East Timor — Dili and Baucau, which they are to receive annually “to run social programs for people”. Poverty remains a massive problem since independence in 2002, with about half of the 1 million population unemployed and 45 per cent living on less than US$1 a day.

On 23 June 2016 the blessing and dedication of the new St John de Brito chapel took place in Cairui in Baucau, built with project support from Catholic Mission (Australia).

The Maria Auxiliadora Medical Clinic run by the Salesians of Don Bosco in the town of Venilale, has been serving the residents of Venilale and 13 surrounding villages for many years. In 2014, the clinic cared for more than 7,300 patients focusing on the care of mothers and babies.

== Bishops ==
1. Bishop Basílio do Nascimento (6 March 2004 – 30 October 2021; apostolic administrator from 30 November 1996)
2. Bishop Leandro Maria Alves (26 April 2023 – present)

== Structure ==
The Diocese of Baucau is a suffragan diocese within the ecclesiastical province of Dili. Along with the bishops of Dili and Maliana, the bishop of Baucau is a member of the Timorese Episcopal Conference. The conference is represented in the Federation of Asian Bishops' Conferences.

=== Territory ===
The diocese covers a total area of 6,987 km^{2} (2,698 square miles). Its territory comprises the eastern municipalities of Baucau, Lautém, Manatuto, and Viqueque. The diocese borders the Archdiocese of Dili to the west. As of 2022, the diocese has a total population of 408,778, of whom 398,538 (97.5%) are Catholic. The remaining few thousand are roughly divided equally between Protestants and non-Christians, including Muslims, Buddhists, Hindus, and animists.

=== Personnel ===
The diocese is led by Bishop Leandro Maria Alves, who is assisted by vicar general Msgr. Francisco Pinheiro da Silva. As of 2022, the diocese has 43 secular priests and 38 religious priests, with 68 seminarians in formation. Additionally, there are 30 religious brothers and 184 religious sisters living and working in the diocese. In 2022, there were 516 catechists in the diocese. As of 2018, six male religious congregations were operating in the diocese, along with 23 female congregations.

=== Parishes ===
As of 2022, the diocese was divided into 22 parishes, with 206 missions. In 2024, Nossa Senhora do Rosário de Fátima in Mehara became the diocese's newest parish; previously, it was a mission of the Lospalos parish.

Parish	Location	Municipality
São José Operário	Baguia	Baucau
Sagrado Coração de Jesus	Baucau	Baucau
St. Anthony (cathedral)	Baucau	Baucau
São João Bosco	Laga	Baucau
Santa Teresinha do Menino Jesus	Quelicai	Baucau
Nossa Senhora da Graça	Vemasse	Baucau
Sagrado Coração de Jesus	Venilale	Baucau
Nossa Senhora do Rosário de Fátima	Iliomar	Lautém
Cristo Rei	Lautém	Lautém
São Paulo	Lospalos	Lautém
Nossa Senhora Rainha dos Apóstolos	Luro	Lautém
Nossa Senhora do Rosário de Fátima	Mehara	Lautém
São Vicente Ferrer	Laclo	Manatuto
Nossa Senhora da Graça	Laclubar	Manatuto
Nossa Senhora do Rosário	Laleia	Manatuto
Santo António	Manatuto	Manatuto
Nossa Senhora da Imaculada Conceição	Natarbora	Manatuto
Sagrado Coração de Jesus	Soibada	Manatuto
Santo António	Lacluta	Viqueque
Nossa Senhora do Imaculado Coração	Nahareca	Viqueque
Santa Teresinha do Menino Jesus	Ossu	Viqueque
Nossa Senhora de Fátima	Uatulari	Viqueque
Nossa Senhora do Rosário de Fátima	Uatucarbau	Viqueque
Imaculada Conceição	Viqueque	Viqueque

== See also ==
- Catholic Church in Timor-Leste
- List of Catholic dioceses in Timor-Leste
