= Archdiocese of Dili =

Roman Catholic archdiocese in East Timor

Coordinates: 8.5584°S 125.5676°E

Archdiocese of Dili Archidioecesis Diliensis Arquidiocese de Díli Arkidioseze Dili

catholic
- Seal of the Archdiocese of Dili

Location
- Country: Timor-Leste
- Territory: Atauro, Aileu, Ainaro, Dili, Ermera, Manufahi, and Oecusse municipalities
- Ecclesiastical province: Dili

Statistics
- Area: 4,755 km^{2} (1,836 sq mi)
- Population: Total; Catholics: (as of 2022); ▲783,437; ▲740,250 (94.5%)
- Parishes: 33

Information
- Denomination: Catholic Church
- Sui iuris church: Latin Church
- Rite: Roman Rite
- Established: 4 September 1940; 85 years ago, as Diocese of Dili; 11 September 2019; 6 years ago, as Archdiocese of Dili
- Cathedral: Immaculate Conception Cathedral
- Secular priests: 74 (2022)

Current leadership
- Pope: Leo XIV
- Archbishop: Virgílio do Carmo da Silva
- Vicar General: Graciano Santos Barros

Map
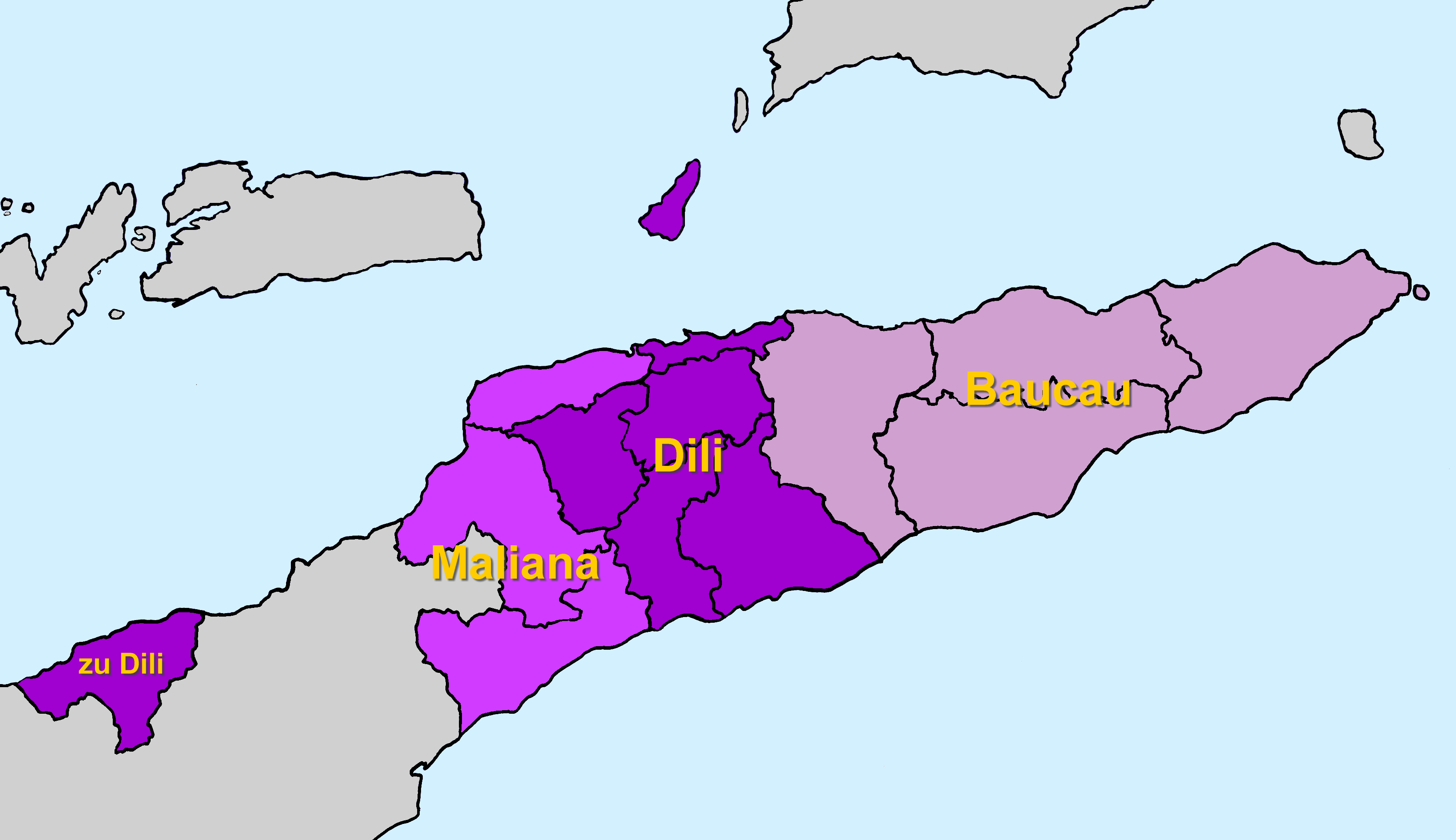
- Location of the archdiocese within East Timor

The Archdiocese of Dili (Latin: Archidioecesis Diliensis; Portuguese: Arquidiocese de Díli; Tetum: Arkidioseze Dili) is a Latin Church archdiocese of the Catholic Church in Timor-Leste. Centered in Dili, the country's capital and largest city, it has two suffragan dioceses, Baucau and Maliana. The oldest of the Timor-Leste three dioceses, it was established in 1940 by Pope Pius XII. Its status was raised to a metropolitan archdiocese in 2019 by Pope Francis. The current archbishop of Dili since 2016 is Cardinal Virgílio do Carmo da Silva.

The Archdiocese of Dili serves over 740,000 Catholics across the municipalities of Atauro, Aileu, Ainaro, Dili, Ermera, Manufahi, and Oecusse, covering a total area of 4,775 square kilometres (1,844 sq mi). The mother church of the archdiocese is Immaculate Conception Cathedral in Dili. As of 2022, the archdiocese has 33 parishes and 234 missions, and is served by 74 secular priests and 1,024 religious priests, brothers, and sisters.

The archdiocese operates two seminaries, St. Peter and St. Paul Major Seminary and the historic Our Lady of Fatima Minor Seminary, as well as a number of primary and secondary schools. The archdiocese is also home to Universidade Católica Timorense, established in 2021, which operates under the auspices of the Conferência Episcopal Timorense.

== History ==
- 4 September 1940: Established by the bull Sollemnibus Conventionibus of Pope Pius XII as the Diocese of Díli from the Diocese of Macau. It was made a suffragan of the Archdiocese of Goa and Daman.
- On 1 January 1976 with the bull Ad nominum of Pope Paul VI the diocese was given exempt status, which made it immediately subject to the Holy See.
- In 1983 Bishop Carlos Filipe Ximenes Belo, SDB, took over the administration of the Dili diocese. Then the only diocese in the territory, the 700,000 Catholics were divided into 30 parishes administered by 71 priests.
- 12 October 1989: Pope John Paul II celebrated Mass with crowds of young people of East Timor.
- On 30 November 1996 it lost a portion of its territory to the newly erected Diocese of Baucau.
- On 20 June 2002, Portugal's ambassador to East Timor inaugurated the official residence of Dili's archbishop, a €300,000 building financed entirely by the Portuguese government, to replace the archbishop's former home, which had been burned down in September 1999.
- In 2009 the East Timorese government gave US$1.5 million to two dioceses in East Timor—Dili and Baucau—which they are to receive annually "to run social programs for people". Poverty remains a massive problem since independence in 2002, with about half of the 1 million population unemployed and 45 per cent living on less than US$1 a day.
- In 2017 the diocese had 28 parishes with 585,958 Catholics. In 2019 it had grown to 30 parishes in the five districts of Dili, Ermera, Aielu, Ainaro and Manufahi. It has 149 priests, including 63 diocesan priests, 86 religious priests, 132 brothers and 432 nuns. The country's only major seminary, St. Peter and St. Paul Major Seminary, is located within the diocese.
- On 11 September 2019, Pope Francis elevated Dili to the status of a metropolitan archdiocese; the Ecclesiastical Province of Dili has suffragan sees, the dioceses of Baucau and Maliana. Bishop Virgílio do Carmo da Silva was raised to the rank of archbishop.

== Bishops ==
=== Bishops and apostolic administrators ===
- Jaime Garcia Goulart (12 October 1945 – 31 January 1967; apostolic administrator from 18 January 1941)
- José Joaquim Ribeiro (31 January 1967 – 22 October 1977)
- Martinho da Costa Lopes (apostolic administrator, 22 October 1977 – May 1983)
- Carlos Filipe Ximenes Belo, SDB (apostolic administrator, 21 March 1988 – 26 November 2002)
- Basilio do Nascimento (apostolic administrator, 26 November 2002 – 27 February 2004)
- Alberto Ricardo da Silva (27 February 2004 – 9 February 2015)
- Virgílio do Carmo da Silva, SDB (30 January 2016 – 11 September 2019)

=== Archbishops of Dili ===
- Virgílio do Carmo da Silva, SDB (11 September 2019 – present)

== See also ==
- Catholic Church in Timor-Leste
- List of Catholic dioceses in Timor-Leste
