= Catholic Church in Timor-Leste =

- Portuguese: Igreja Católica em Timor-Leste; Tetun: Igreja Katólika iha Timor-Leste; Indonesian: Gereja Katolik di Timor Leste
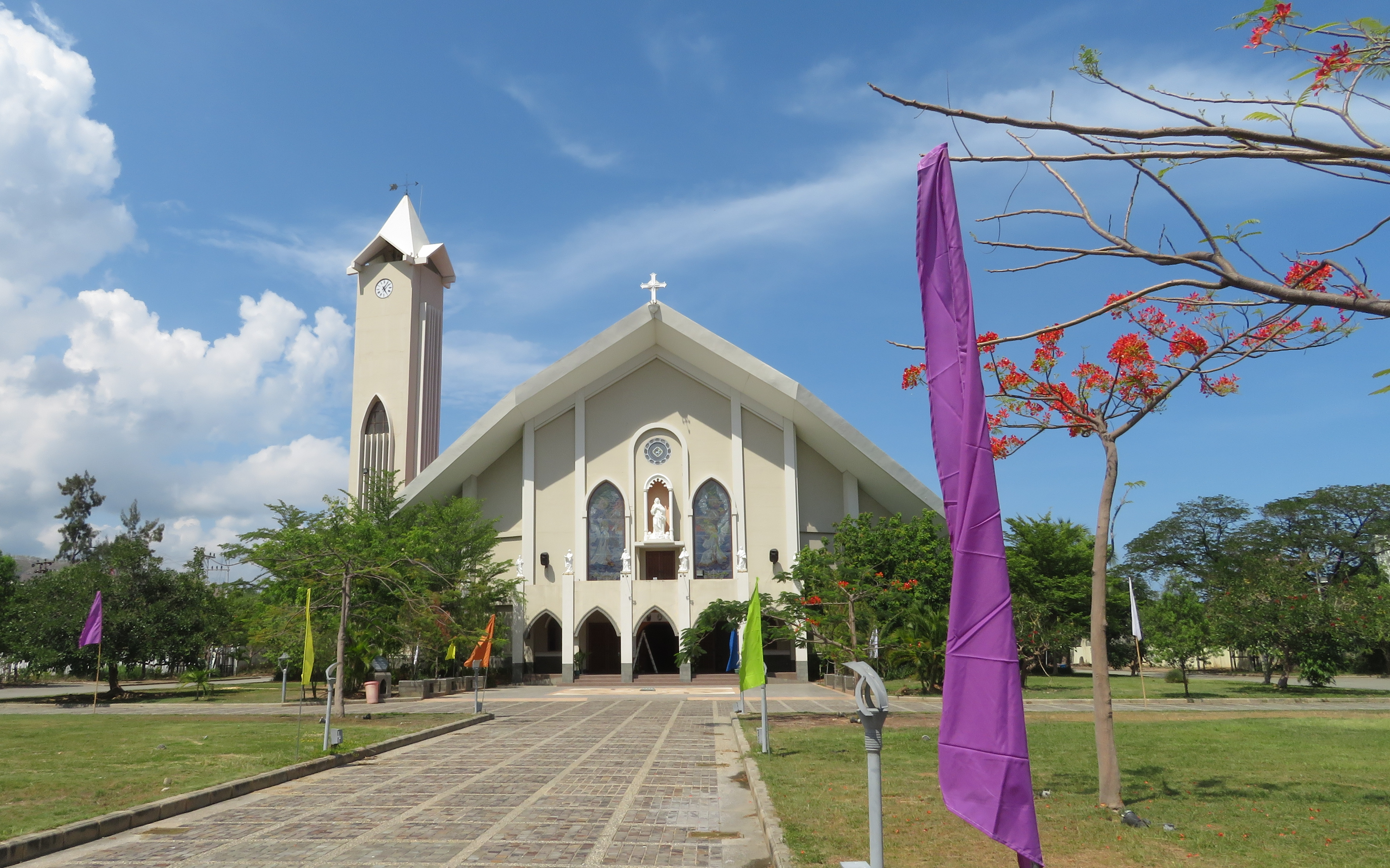
- Immaculate Conception Cathedral, Dili
- Type: National polity
- Classification: Catholic
- Orientation: Latin
- Scripture: Bible
- Theology: Catholic theology
- Governance: Episcopal Conference of Timor
- Pope: Leo XIV
- Apostolic Nuncio: vacant
- Region: Timor-Leste
- Language: Tetum, Indonesian, Portuguese, Latin
- Origin: 1515; Pre-colonial Timor (Later Portuguese Timor, Portuguese Empire)

The Catholic Church in Timor-Leste is part of the worldwide Catholic Church, under the spiritual leadership of the pope in Rome.

== Organization ==
Upon its independence from Indonesia, Timor-Leste became only the second predominantly Catholic country in Asia (after the Philippines), a legacy of its status as a former Portuguese colony.

About 98.3% of the population was Catholic in Timor-Leste in 2016, which meant over 1,000,000 faithful.

The country was divided into three dioceses: Dili, Baucau and Maliana (erected in 2010). These dioceses are immediately subject to the Holy See.

The Apostolic Nunciature to East Timor is Marco Sprizzi, who took over from Wojciech Załuski in 2022.

== History ==
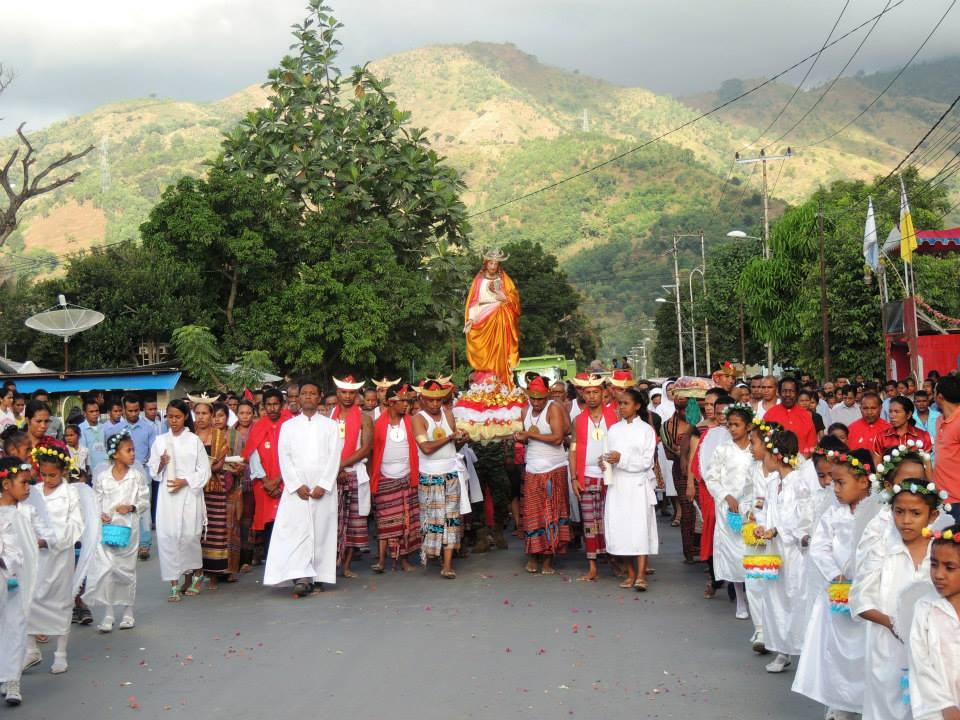
Procession in Becora, Dili

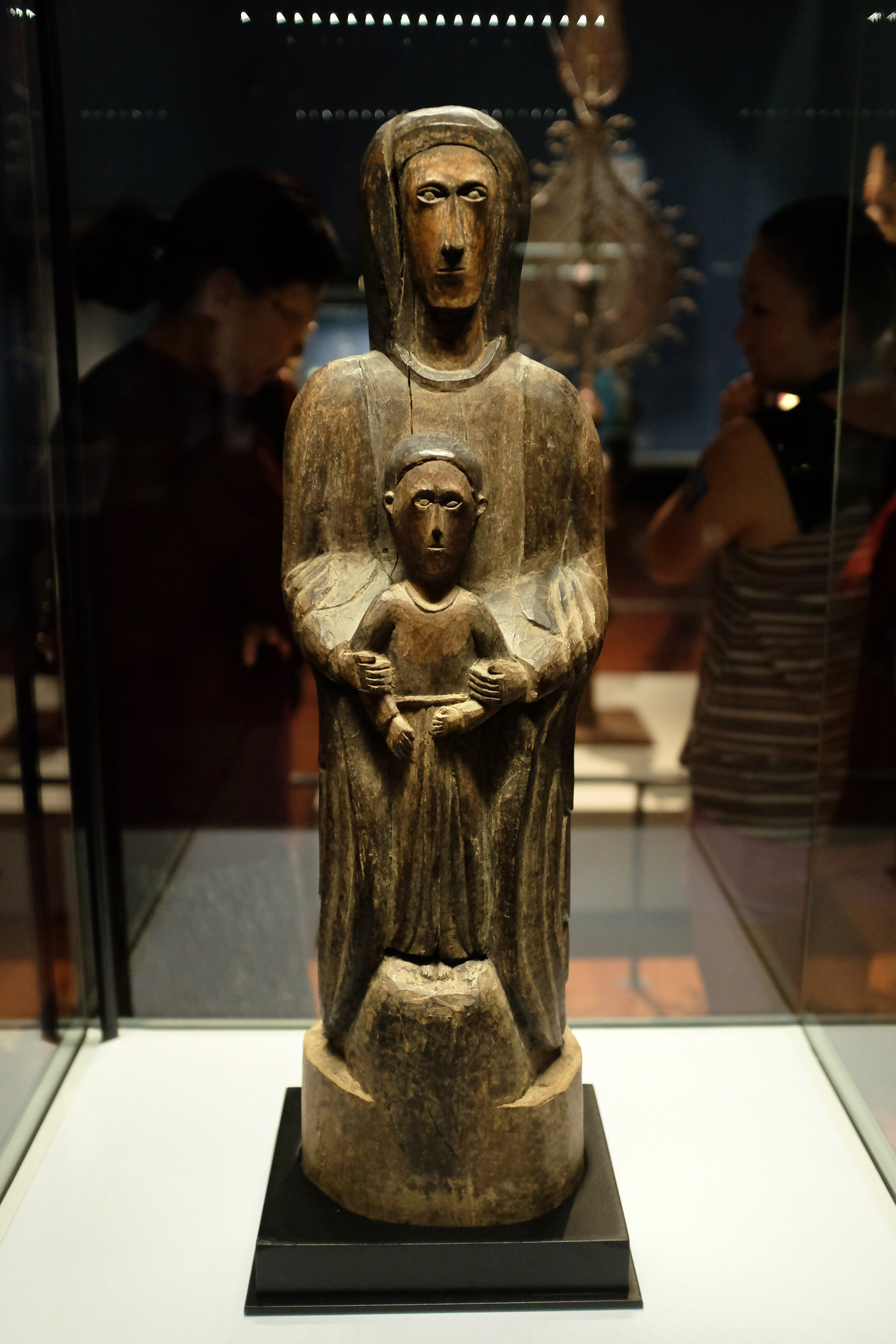
Virgin and child from Timor-Leste, 19th century

In the early 16th century, Portuguese and Dutch traders made contact with Timor-Leste. A Dominican mission was sent by the bishop of Malacca to Solor in 1562, and became established at Lifau in present-day Timor-Leste in 1641. Portugal took over and maintained control of Timor-Leste until 1974, with a brief occupation by Japan during World War II.

Indonesia invaded East Timor in 1975 and annexed the former Portuguese colony. East Timorese animist belief systems did not fit with Indonesia's constitutional monotheism, resulting in mass conversions to Christianity. Portuguese clergy were replaced with Indonesian priests (especially with Javanese priests) and Latin and Portuguese Mass was replaced by Indonesian Mass. Officially splitting from the Portuguese Church in 1975, the Church in East Timor never joined the Indonesian Church. The Church played an important role in society during the Indonesian occupation of East Timor. While just 20% of East Timorese called themselves Catholics at the time of the 1975 invasion, the figure surged to reach 95% by the end of the first decade after the invasion.

During the occupation, Bishop Carlos Ximenes Belo became one of the most prominent advocates for human rights in Timor-Leste and many priests and nuns risked their lives in defending citizens from military abuses.

Pope John Paul II's 1989 visit to Timor-Leste exposed the occupied territory's situation to world media and provided a catalyst for independence activists to seek global support. Officially neutral, the Vatican wished to retain good relations with Indonesia, the world's largest Muslim nation. Upon his arrival in Timor-Leste, the pope symbolically kissed a cross then pressed it to the ground, alluding to his usual practice of kissing the ground on arrival in a nation, and yet avoiding overtly suggesting Timor-Leste was a sovereign country. He spoke fervently against abuses in his sermon, whilst avoiding naming the Indonesian authorities as responsible. The pope spoke out against violence in Timor-Leste, and called for both sides to show restraint, imploring the East Timorese to "love and pray for their enemies."

In 1996, Bishop Belo and José Ramos-Horta, two leading East Timorese activists for peace and independence, received the Nobel Peace Prize for ""their work towards a just and peaceful solution to the conflict in East Timor".

A number of priests and nuns were murdered in the violence in Timor-Leste that followed the 1999 independence referendum. The newly independent nation declared three days of national mourning upon the death of Pope John Paul II in 2005.

The Catholic Church remains very involved in politics, with its 2005 confrontations with the government over religious education in school and the forgoing of war crimes trials for atrocities against East Timorese by Indonesia. They have also endorsed the new prime minister in his efforts to promote national reconciliation. In June 2006 Catholic Relief Services received aid from the United States to help victims of months of unrest in the country. The number of churches grew from 100 in 1974 to over 800 in 1994.

In 2015, the Salesians of Don Bosco and the Daughters of Mary Help of Christians, with the help of an international relief organization Stop Hunger Now, provided more than 1,100 students across the country with better nutrition through fortified rice-meals.

Pope Francis visited Dili from 9 to 11 September 2024; 600,000 out of 1 million Timorese attended his mass.

== See also ==
- List of Catholic dioceses in East Timor
  - Archdiocese of Díli (erected 1940 from the Roman Catholic Diocese of Macau)
    - Diocese of Baucau (erected 1996 from Roman Catholic Diocese of Díli)
    - Diocese of Maliana (erected 2010 from Roman Catholic Diocese of Díli)
- Religion in Timor-Leste
- Apostolic Nunciature to East Timor
