= First Lady of Timor-Leste =

- Flag of Timor-Leste
- Incumbent; Vacant since 20 May 2022
- Residence: Nicolau Lobato Presidential Palace
- Formation: 1975

The first lady of East Timor (Portuguese: Primeira-dama de Timor-Leste) is the title attributed to the wife of the president of Timor-Leste.

== First ladies of Timor-Leste ==
=== First ladies of East Timor during the War for Independence ===
| Portrait | Name | Term Began | Term Ended | President | Notes |
|---|---|---|---|---|---|
| | Lucia Osorio Soares | November 28, 1975 | December 7, 1975 | Francisco Xavier do Amaral | Lucia Osorio Soares married Francisco Xavier do Amaral in 1974, a year before East Timor's short-lived proclamation of independence. However, the couple separated shortly after their marriage. Francisco Xavier do Amaral never remarried. |
| | Position vacant | December 7, 1975 | December 31, 1978 | Nicolau dos Reis Lobato (Acting president in exile) | Lobato's wife, Isabel Barreto Lobato, was executed by Indonesian forces in Dili on December 8, 1975, one day after the Indonesian invasion of East Timor. |

=== First ladies of Timor-Leste following the restoration of independence ===
| Portrait | Name | Term Began | Term Ended | President | Notes |
|---|---|---|---|---|---|
| | Kirsty Sword Gusmão | May 20, 2002 | May 20, 2007 | Xanana Gusmão | Xanana Gusmão met Kirsty Sword, an Australian-born a teacher and human rights activist, in 1994 while he was serving a 20-year sentence as a political prison during the Indonesian occupation. The couple married in 2000, shortly after his release from prison. Upon regaining independence in 2002, Sword become the first post-independence First Lady of East Timor. Sword Gusmão focused on education during her tenure. In March 2015, Sword and Gusmão announced their separation. |
| | Position vacant | May 20, 2007 | February 11, 2008 | José Ramos-Horta | José Ramos-Horta and his former wife, Ana Pessoa Pinto, had divorced prior to his victory in the 2007 East Timorese presidential election. President Ramos-Horta was shot and seriously wounded in an assassination attempt on February 11, 2008. While her remained president, two interim presidents served in office from February 11, 2008, until April 17, 2008. Their wives held the positions of interim first lady during that time. |
| | Maria Goretti Guterres Marques | February 11, 2008 | February 13, 2008 | Vicente Guterres | |
| | Joy Aquino Siapno | February 13, 2008 | April 17, 2008 | Fernando de Araújo | Jacqueline "Joy" Aquino Siapno, a political economist and analyst, served as interim First Lady during 2008. Aquino Siapno, who is originally from the city of Dagupan in the Philippines, is the country's only first lady of Filipina origin. She authored several books on the culture, history and politics of East Timor, Aceh, Indonesia, the Philippines and other regions of Southeast Asia. |
| | Position vacant | April 17, 2008 | May 20, 2012 | José Ramos-Horta | José Ramos-Horta returned to office full-time following an assassination attempt in March 2008. He and his former wife, Ana Pessoa Pinto, had divorced before he became president. |
| | Isabel da Costa Ferreira | May 20, 2012 | May 20, 2017 | Taur Matan Ruak | |
| | Cidália Lopes Nobre Mouzinho Guterres | May 20, 2017 | May 20, 2022 | Francisco Guterres | |
| | Position vacant | May 20, 2022 | Present | José Ramos-Horta | José Ramos-Horta was reelected to office in the 2022 East Timorese presidential election. He and his former wife, Ana Pessoa Pinto, had divorced before he became president. |
