= António da Conceição =

East Timorese politician (born 1964)

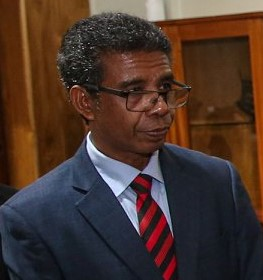
- Conceição in 2020

Member of the National Parliament
- Incumbent
- Assumed office 13 June 2018

Minister for Commerce and Industry
- In office 15 September 2017 – 22 June 2018
- Prime Minister: Mari Alkatiri
- Preceded by: Constâncio Pinto
- Succeeded by: Ágio Pereira (acting)

Minister of State, Coordinator of Social Affairs and Minister of Education
- In office 10 August 2015 – 15 September 2017
- Prime Minister: Rui Maria de Araújo
- Preceded by: Fernando de Araújo
- Succeeded by: Rui Maria de Araújo (acting)

Minister of Commerce, Industry and Environment
- In office 8 August 2012 – 10 August 2015
- Prime Minister: Xanana Gusmão; (to 16 February 2015); Rui Maria de Araújo; (from 16 February 2015)
- Preceded by: Gil Alves
- Succeeded by: Constâncio Pinto

Personal details
- Born: 8 October 1964 (age 61) Leorema, Liquiçá; Portuguese Timor (now East Timor)
- Party: Democratic Party (PD)
- Spouse: Fátima Néves Camões

António da Conceição (born 8 October 1964), also known by his nom de guerre Kalohan (transl. "Cloud"), is an East Timorese politician, and a member of the Democratic Party (PD). He has held several Ministries in the government, and as of 2021 was a Member of the National Parliament.

== Early life and career ==
Conceição was born in Leorema, Liquiçá, Portuguese Timor (now East Timor). He went to elementary school at the Children's College of Sagres (Portuguese: Colégio Infantil de Sagres) in Maliana until 1975. Then, after a short break, he attended the Seminary of Our Lady of Fatima (Portuguese: Seminário Menor de Nossa Senhora de Fátima) in Dare, Dili, and St Joseph's High School (Portuguese: Colégio de São José) in Balide, Dili. From 1987 to 1991, he studied philosophy and theology in Malang, Indonesia.

During the Indonesian occupation of East Timor, Conceição was a member of the National Resistance of East Timorese Students (Portuguese: Resistência Nacional dos Estudantes de Timor-Leste (Renetil)). While studying in Malang, he was also the regional secretary of Renetil. From 1991, he was part of Renetil's eight-member Presidium, and he was active in the resistance until 1999. In 2001, together with other members of RENETIL, he founded the PD.

In 1999, Conceição was the Executive Officer of Timor Aid based in Dili. From 2001 to 2002, he was the Advisor to the II UNTAET Transitional Government on the Development of the Commission on Planning. He then completed a Master's degree in international relations and strategic studies at Lancaster University in the United Kingdom from 2003 to 2005.

== Political career ==
In the 2012 East Timorese parliamentary election, Conceição was elected to the National Parliament from fourth place on the PD list. However, on 8 August 2021 he was sworn in as Minister of Commerce, Industry and Environment in the V Constitutional Government under Prime Minister Xanana Gusmão. He therefore had to give up his parliamentary seat.

When the VI Constitutional Government was formed in February 2015 by new Prime Minister Rui Maria de Araújo, Conceição retained his ministerial office. On 2 June 2015, the leader of the PD, Fernando de Araújo, died suddenly. He had also been Minister of State, Coordinator of Social Affairs and Minister of Education, and on 10 August 2015, Conceição was appointed to succeed him in all three of those offices. Conceição's successor as Minister of Commerce, Industry and Environment was Constâncio Pinto.

In March 2016, the coalition between CNRT and PD broke down, over a conflict between the government and parliament on the one hand and President Taur Matan Ruak on the other. The dispute related to the appointment of the Commander of the Timor Leste Defence Force. To ensure the stability of the government, Conceição and the other members of the PD in the executive announced their withdrawal from the party. They kept their offices as independent politicians.

Despite this development, Conceição remained Secretary General of the PD, and on 27 January 2017 he finally declared his candidacy for the 2017 East Timorese presidential election as the PD's nominee. In the vote on 20 March 2017, he received just under one third of the ballots cast, and finished in second place. Subsequently, in the parliamentary election of 2017, Conceição was elected to the National Parliament from second place on the PD list. However, he only attended the first day of parliament on 5 September 2017 and then waived his seat in favor of Júlio Sarmento da Costa.

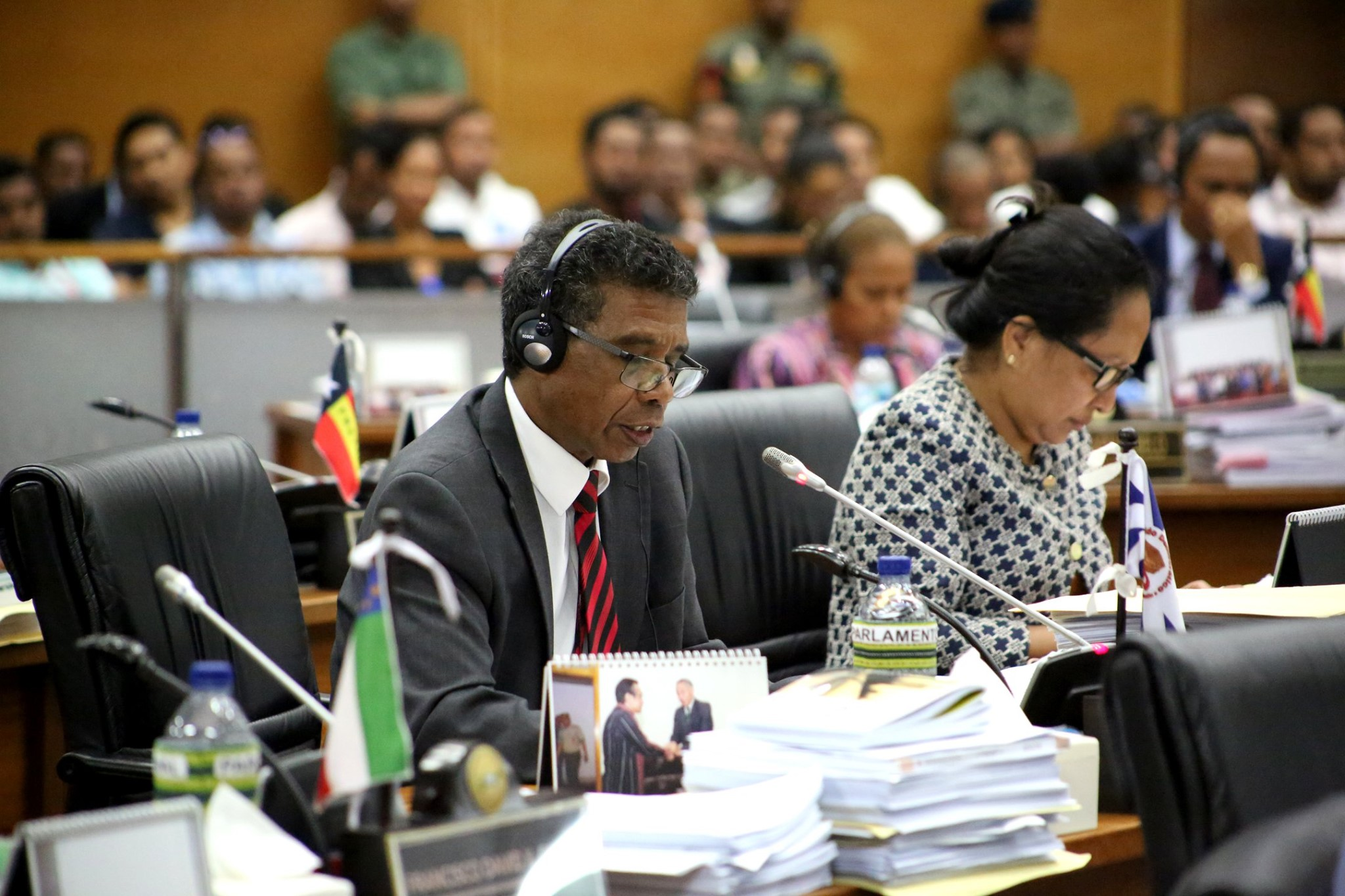
Conceição during a parliamentary session in 2020

On 15 September 2017, Conceição was sworn in as Minister for Commerce and Industry in the VII Constitutional Government under Prime Minister Mari Alkatiri. As that Fretilin / PD minority administration could not prevail in the National Parliament, President Francisco Guterres dissolved the parliament and called a fresh parliamentary election. In the election, held on 12 May 2018, Conceição was again elected, from second place on the PD list, to the parliament, in which the PD initially became part of the opposition. His tenure as a Minister ended when the VIII Constitutional Government took office on 22 June 2018.

As of 2021, Conceição was a Member of the V Legislature of East Timor and two of its Committees.

== Personal life ==
Conceição is married to Fátima Néves Camões.
