= Clotilde Maria de Fátima =

East Timorese revolutionary and first wife of President Francisco Guterres

- Born: 15 November 1950; Ossu, Portuguese Timor
- Died: 15 November 1981 (aged 31); Ossu, East Timor
- Cause of death: Gunshot wound
- Other name: Lou Tik (nom de guerre)
- Years active: 1975–1981
- Organization: Popular Organization of Timorese Women
- Political party: Fretilin
- Spouse: Francisco Guterres (m. 1978)

Clotilde Maria de Fátima e Silva (15 November 1950 – 15 November 1981), also known by her nom de guerre Lou Tik, was an East Timorese revolutionary and the first wife of Francisco Guterres, who went on to become the 6th president of Timor-Leste.

Fátima was born on 15 November 1950 in the village of Nahareca, Ossu, in what was then Portuguese Timor. She became involved as an activist in the East Timorese independence movement starting in August 1975. She joined the Revolutionary Front for an Independent Timor-Leste (Fretilin) and was a member of the party's women's wing, the Popular Organization of Timorese Women (OPMT). It was during this time that she met her future husband, Francisco Guterres, nom de guerre Lú-Olo, who was her superior within the Fretilin structure in Ossu .

Following the Indonesian invasion of East Timor in December 1975, Fátima became a member of the clandestine front supporting Fretilin's resistance activities. Between late 1975 and February 1977, she served as a zone assistant in the Ossu area under the leadership of Horácio da Silva. Beginning in March 1977, she once again began serving under Guterres' leadership. At this time, she held the position of political assistant and was also responsible for the OPMT's activities in the Kamnase Builó area.

Fátima and Guterres married in a guerrilla camp in the Ossu region in September 1978. Standing before a Fretilin flag, they swore before witnesses that they would fight for independence, even to death. On 15 November 1981, Guterres left their camp in Ahalekimeta near Ossu to search for food. Fátima, who was sick and pregnant at the time, stayed behind with a guard, Mariano Rubi-Loi. While Guterres was away, Indonesian forces raided the camp, shooting both Fátima and Rubi-Loi. Guterres managed to return to the camp three days later, where he found their bodies.

In November 2020, as president, Guterres posthumously awarded Fátima the Medal of the Order of Timor-Leste in recognition of her contributions to Timor-Leste's liberation struggle. She also received the Order of Falintil, awarded posthumously to East Timorese national liberation fighters who died after 1 January 1979.
