= Joy Aquino Siapno =

Filipina-American academic (born 1968)

First Lady of East Timor
- In office February 13, 2008 – April 17, 2008
- President: Fernando de Araújo (acting)
- Preceded by: Maria Goretti Guterres Marques (2008)
- Succeeded by: Isabel da Costa Ferreira (2012)

Personal details
- Born: Jacqueline Aquino Siapno c. 1967 Dagupan, Philippines
- Spouse: Fernando de Araújo (died 2015)
- Children: Hadomi
- Education: University of California, Berkeley (Ph.D.); SOAS University of London; Wellesley College (B.A.)

Jacqueline "Joy" Aquino Siapno (born c. 1967) is a Filipina-born American political economist, academic, analyst, writer, and musician specializing in Southeast Asia. She served as the First Lady of East Timor from February 13, 2008, until April 17, 2008, during the interim presidency of her husband, Fernando de Araújo. She is the first and only first lady of Filipina descent in East Timor's history.

== Biography ==
Siapno was born in the city of Dagupan, located in Pangasinan province of the Philippines. Her mother, Corona Balolong Aquino, is a lawyer. She speaks fluent Tagalog, Pangasinan, Malay, Tetum, and Bahasa Indonesia.

Siapno attended Ednas School in Dagupan until she was 14-years-old, when she moved with her mother to California in the United States. She graduated from Mt. Eden High School in Hayward, CA in 1985. Siapno received a scholarship to Wellesley College in Massachusetts, where she received a Bachelor's of Arts in political science. She then completed her master's degree at the SOAS University of London and her doctorate at the University of California, Berkeley.

During her doctoral studies at the University of California, Berkeley, Siapno studied the independence movements of Aceh and East Timor in Indonesia. She lived and worked in Aceh for several years. While studying in Indonesia, Siapno met her future husband, Fernando de Araújo, an East Timorese dissident and political prisoner who was serving a seven years in prison for "subversion against the state" in Jakarta at the time. The two exchanged letters from prison, though Indonesian authorities sometimes held the letters for up to six months. Upon Fernando de Araújo's release, Siapno moved to East Timor with him. The couple had one son, Hadomi. In a 2009 interview, Siapno "I want Hadomi to be both Filipino and Timorese."

Fernando de Araújo founded the Democratic Party, helped establish Dilli University, and was elected President of the National Parliament in August 2007. Meanwhile, Siapno continued to teach and write. She travelled from East Timor to Spain as a professor once a year.

In February 2008, then-President José Ramos-Horta was seriously injured in an assassination attempt. As president of the National Parliament, Fernando de Araújo was one of two individuals to serve as acting president during Ramos–Horta's recovery. Joy Aquino Siapno became the interim First Lady of East Timor from February 2008 to April 2008. She was still a Filipina and American citizen at the time, as her application for East Timorese citizenship had not yet been finalized. Siapno admitted at the time that, as a foreign citizen, some East Timorese showed reluctance to accept her as first lady, but it helped that she had lived and worked in the country for years.

During her short tenure as first lady, Siapno accepted an offer to join the faculty at Seoul National University's Graduate School of International Studies, beginning in August 2009. She taught as a professor at Seoul National University from 2009 until 2012.

In 2014, Joy Aquino Siapno and Fernando de Araújo formally separated after 15 years of marriage. Siapno left East Timor with her son on August 29, 2014, but their divorce was never finalized before his death from a stroke in June 2015. She published a memorial piece on her late husband and their relationship together in the Rappler, a major Philippine online news publication, in July 2015.

== Selected works ==
- Gender, Islam, Nationalism and the State in Aceh: The Paradox of Power, Co-optation and Resistance (2013)
- The Accompanists (2016)
