= Cidália Guterres =

Former First Lady of East Timor

Cidália Lopes Nobre Mouzinho Guterres
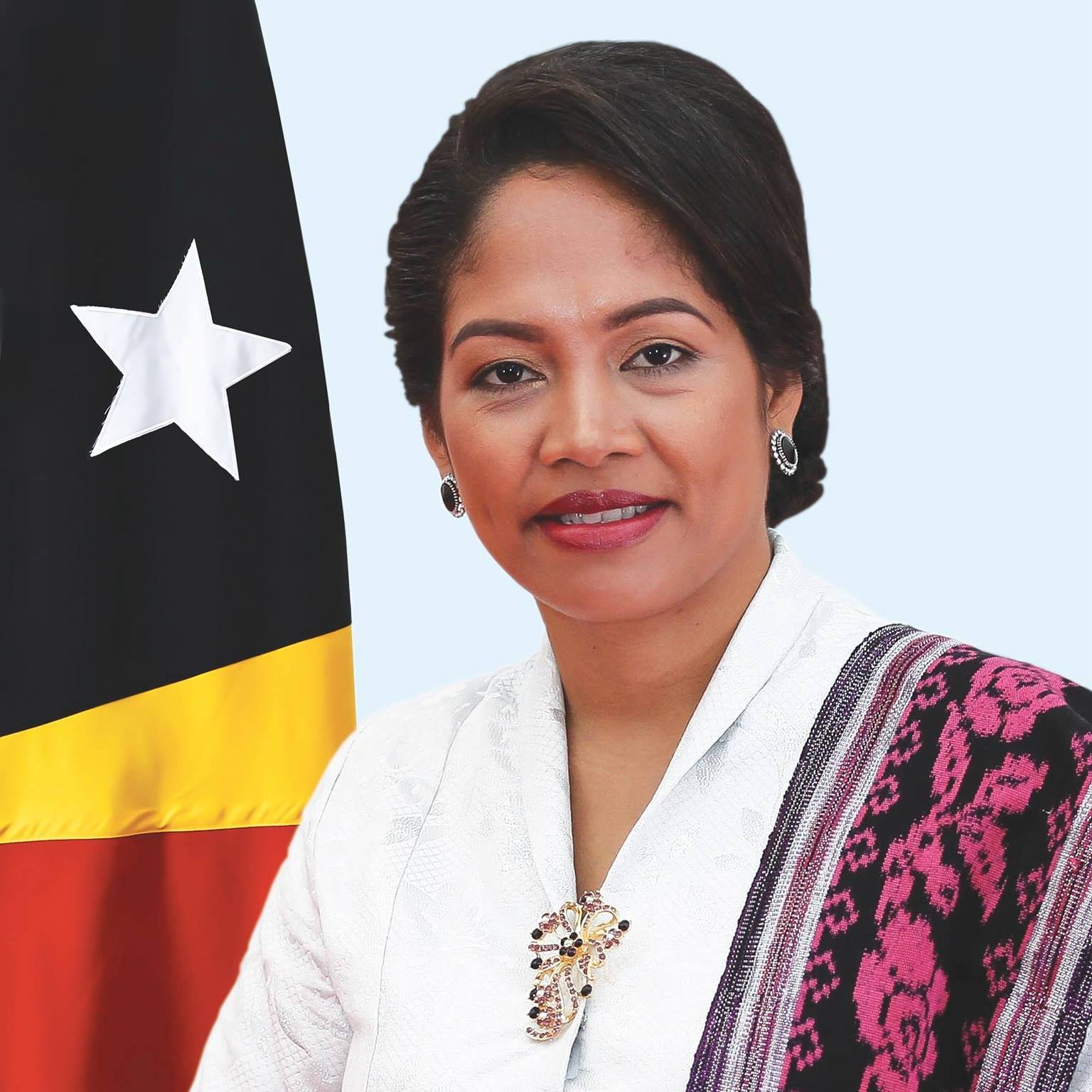
- Guterres in 2020

First Lady of East Timor
- In role 20 May 2017 – 20 May 2022
- President: Francisco Guterres
- Preceded by: Isabel da Costa Ferreira
- Succeeded by: Vacant

Personal details
- Spouse: Francisco Guterres
- Children: 4

Cidália Lopes Nobre Mouzinho Guterres is the widow of former president of East Timor Francisco Guterres and as such was First Lady of East Timor from 20 May 2017 to 20 May 2022. A native of the Atauro Island, in East Timor, she became the second wife of the Francisco Guterres on 4 May 2002 with whom she had three sons and one daughter.

Before her marriage, Cidália Guterres was a leading member of the Organização Popular de Mulheres Timorense, the feminist organization of the FRETILIN party whose president was Francisco Guterres.

After the presidential election of 20 March 2017, Lopes Guterres announced her claim to be engaged in social activities in favour of women, widows, orphans, as well as for old, disabled and disowned people, though the East Timor constitution didn't specifically mention such a type of a mandate for the first ladies. From that time, she started to visit a variety of social institutions on a regular basis, to assume representative charges and to be the main responsible of multiple social programs.

In a 2017 survey published by the International Republican Institute, Cidália Guterres received positive feedback from 62% of the members of the sampled size, while her predecessor Isabel da Costa Ferreira reached a target of 89%.
