= Francisco Guterres =

President of East Timor from 2017 to 2022

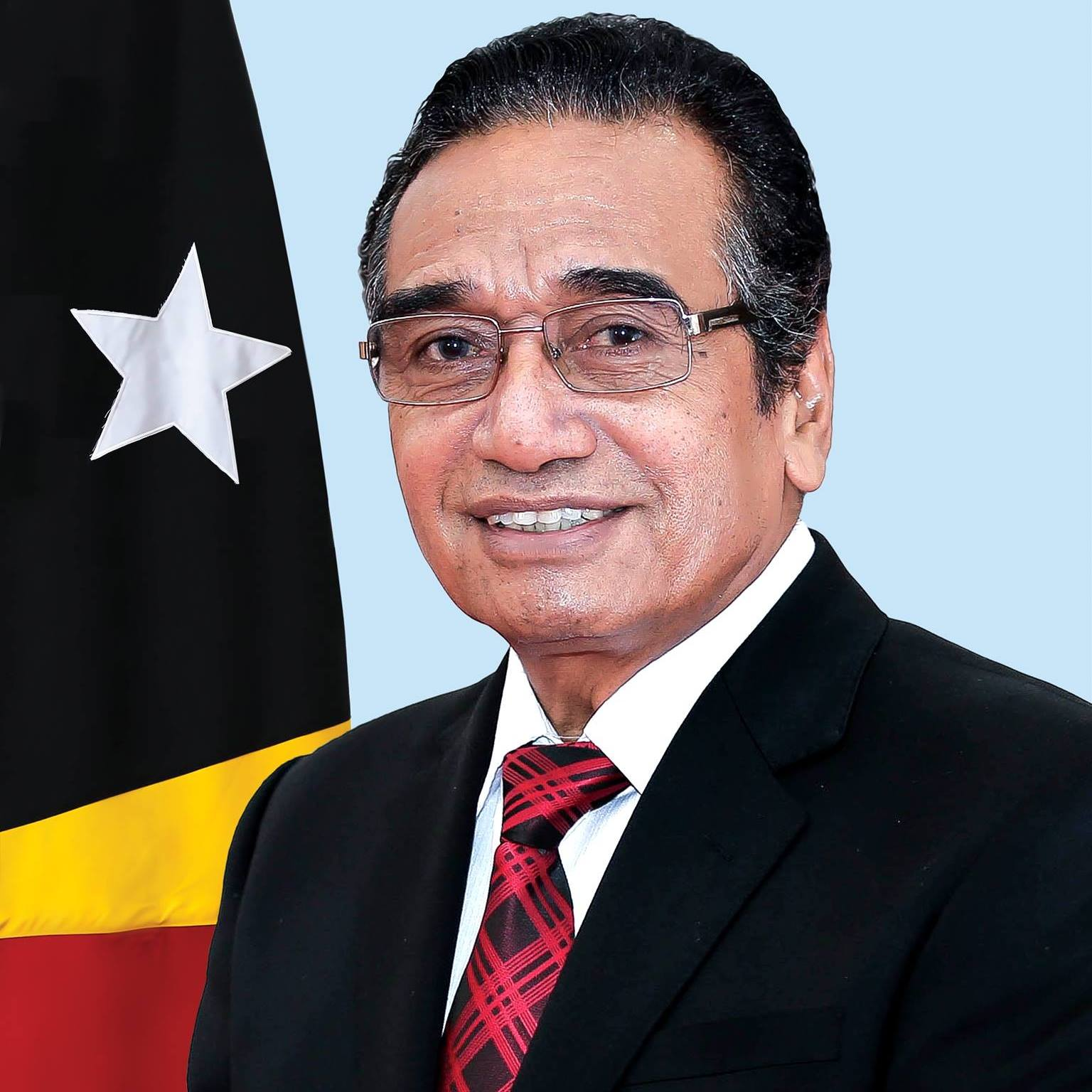
- Official portrait, 2017

6th President of Timor-Leste
- In office 20 May 2017 – 20 May 2022
- Prime Minister: Rui Maria de Araújo; Mari Alkatiri; Taur Matan Ruak
- Preceded by: Taur Matan Ruak
- Succeeded by: José Ramos-Horta

1st President of the National Parliament
- In office 20 May 2002 – 31 July 2007
- Preceded by: Position established
- Succeeded by: Fernando de Araújo

Speaker of the Constituent Assembly
- In office 17 September 2001 – 20 May 2002
- Preceded by: Position established
- Succeeded by: Himself (as President of the National Parliament)

Personal details
- Born: 7 September 1954 Ossu, Portuguese Timor
- Died: 21 June 2026 (aged 71) Kuala Lumpur, Malaysia
- Resting place: Jardim dos Heróis da Pátria
- Party: Fretilin
- Spouse(s): Clotilde Maria de Fátima (m. 1978; died 1981) Cidália Guterres (m. 2002)
- Children: 4
- Education: Universidade Nacional Timor Lorosa'e
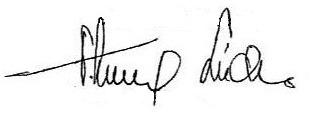
- Signature

Francisco Guterres (7 September 1954 – 21 June 2026), popularly known by his nom de guerre Lú-Olo, was an East Timorese revolutionary and politician who served as the 6th president of Timor-Leste from 2017 to 2022. A member of Fretilin, he was a leading figure in the East Timorese armed resistance during the Indonesian occupation of East Timor.

Born in Ossu, in 1969 Guterres went to Dili, the capital of Portuguese Timor, to attend secondary school. After a brief stint working in Ossu, he returned to Dili in 1974, where he became involved in the growing anti-colonial movement and joined Fretilin. After the Indonesian invasion of East Timor in December 1975, he fled to the mountains and joined a unit of Falintil, Fretilin's armed wing. He spent the entirety of the 24-year Indonesian occupation as a guerrilla, evading capture and gradually rising through the ranks of Falintil. Following Nino Konis Santana's death in 1998, he became leader of Fretilin.

Guterres returned to civilian life before the 1999 East Timorese independence referendum. In 2001, he was elected speaker of the Constituent Assembly, a precursor to the East Timorese parliament that was responsible for drafting the new country's constitution. Upon independence in 2002, he became the first president of Timor-Leste's National Parliament, serving until 2007. Guterres stood for Fretilin in the 2007 and 2012 presidential elections, but was defeated in the second round by independent candidates both times. He was elected president in the 2017 election, supported by former prime minister Xanana Gusmão and his CNRT party. Guterres ran for reelection in 2022, but was defeated in a landslide in the second round by José Ramos-Horta.

== Early life and education ==
Francisco Guterres was born on 7 September 1954 in Belas aldeia, Ossu, Viqueque District, in what was then Portuguese Timor. The son of Felix Guterres and Elda da Costa Guterres, he was the sixth of eight children, four girls and four boys. His sisters were Casilda, Domingas, Francisca, and Maria, and his brothers were António, Cornélio, and Lino. Guterres traces his lineage through his father's uma lisan, Papálo, located at the base of Ossorua mountain. His mother was of the Baimeta uma lisan. As a boy, Guterres' could be oppositional, but was also known for his integrity.

Between 1963 and 1969, he attended Colégio Santa Teresinha in Ossu, taught by Salesian priests, who exerted a strong influence on the moral development of the young Guterres. After finishing primary school, he continued his studies at the Liceu Dr. Francisco Machado in Dili. After completing secondary school in 1973, he returned to Ossu and worked at Colégio Santa Teresinha as a school monitor. In 1974, he returned to Dili to continue his studies, but stopped due to his growing involvement in the anti-colonial movement against Portuguese rule. Later in life, in 2007, he began studying at the Universidade Nacional Timor Lorosa'e, graduating in 2012 with a degree in law.

In 2005 or 2007, Guterres, began studying at the Universidade Nacional Timor Lorosa'e, taking a five-year law course taught by Portuguese professors through the Portuguese Universities' Foundation. He finished his courses in 2011 and graduated in April 2012 with a degree in law.

== Indonesian occupation and guerrilla activities ==
=== Early resistance activities ===
In 1974, Guterres joined the Timorese Social Democratic Association (ASDT), which soon took a more radical anti-colonial stance and renamed itself the Revolutionary Front for an Independent Timor-Leste (Fretilin). In 1975, he joined a mobilization team led by Vicente dos Reis "Sahe" to carry out political organizing and promote support for Fretilin among the population in Ossu. When Indonesia invaded Timor-Leste in December 1975, he joined many other Fretilin members and civilians in retreating to the mountains. He joined a unit of Falintil, Fretilin's armed wing, initially operating in the East Central region near Ossu under the command of Lino Olocassa. He would go on to spend the entirety of the Indonesian occupation in the mountains as a guerrilla fighter and resistance leader. It was during this period that Guterres received his nom de guerre, Lú-Olo, meaning "dove".

In June or July 1976, Guterres was named deputy secretary in Ossu, rising to become zone secretary later that year following his predecessor's capture. After a meeting of the Fretilin central committee in 1976, he was appointed deputy secretary for the Leste sector and began coordinating directly with Falintil commanders. In 1977 or 1978, he was named political commissar for the Ponta Leste sector. In 1978, he was appointed deputy secretary for the zone of 15 de Agosto. By late 1978, the Indonesians managed to consolidate stronger control over the East Timorese population and destroyed many of the guerrillas' support bases. Guterres survived this "encirclement and annihilation" campaign, but many of his fellow Fretilin leaders were captured or killed, including his mentor Vicente dos Reis "Sahe".

In September 1978, Guterres married Clotilde Maria de Fátima e Silva, nom de guerre Lou Tik, a political assistant to the Ponta Leste sector commissariat and a member of the Popular Organization of Timorese Women (OPMT), Fretilin's women's wing. Standing before a Fretilin flag, they swore before witnesses that they would fight for independence, even to death. O 15 November 1981, Guterres left his wife, who was pregnant and sick, at their camp in Ahalekimeta near Ossu to search for food. While he was away, the Indonesian military raided the camp, shooting Lou Tik and her guard, Mariano Rubi-Loi. Three days later, Guterres managed to return to the camp, where he found their bodies.

In March 1981, Fretilin restructured its military leadership to replace those who had been killed in combat. Guterres was appointed deputy responsible for the Central region. In 1982, Guterres was named deputy of the Leste region and also part of the command of Falintil's Third Guerrilla Company. Another source states that in July of 1982 he became deputy of the Central East (Nakroma) region under the command of António Maria da Silva Carvalho, code name Fera Lafaek. He was named political commissar in 1984, assigned to the third unit of Company B. In 1987, he served in the Cruzeiros regions, comprising Aileu, Manufahi, western Manatuto, and the eastern part of Dili.

=== Restructuring and Fretilin leadership ===
In 1987, the Fretilin central committee restructured the East Timorese resistance movement, establishing the National Council of Maubere Resistance (CNRM) as an umbrella organization for the various pro-independence parties. Falintil was also separated from Fretilin and placed under the control of the CNRM, with the intent that it would become a resistance army for all East Timorese. Xanana Gusmão became leader of the CNRM and, to be seen as apolitical, left Fretilin at the same time. Ma'huno Bulerek Karathayano became Fretilin's new leader, with Guterres, Mau Hodu Ran Kadalak, and Nino Konis Santana as his deputies. Mau Hodu was captured in 1991, followed by Xanana in 1992 and Ma'huno in 1993. Konis Santana succeeded Ma'huno as secretary of the Fretilin steering committee and replaced Xanana as leader of the CNRM.

When Konis Santana died in March 1998, Guterres was appointed leader of Fretilin. In April 1998, the Convention of Timorese in the Diaspora was held and the CNRM was succeeded by the CNRT (National Council of Timorese Resistance). Guterres was named a member of the CNRT's national policy council and secretary of the organization's internal policy front. That August, at Guterres' initiative, Fretilin held an extraordinary conference in Sydney, Australia, to reorganize its leadership. Guterres, still in East Timor, participated in the event via satellite phone. The party's steering committee was replaced by a new "presidential council", with Guterres as its general coordinator. Mari Alkatiri was appointed first deputy for the diplomatic front, and Ma'huno was named second deputy for the clandestine front. In early 1999, Guterres returned to Dili, living in hiding in a Fretilin militant's house while coordinating the party's reorganization. Soon after, with Indonesian military activities intensifying, he returned to Waimori, Viqueque.

=== 1999 referendum and Constituent Assembly ===
Following the August 1999 independence referendum, Guterres played a central role in restructuring Fretilin to prepare for the post-independence era. Guterres voted in Liaruka, Ossu, before rejoining the Falintil forces in Waimori. Soon thereafter, he joined the cantonments in Remexio and Aileu where all of Falintil's forces had gathered. There, he finally met Mari Alkatiri, who had returned after years in Mozambique, and they began developing a strategy to reorganize Fretilin. On 26 November 2000, Guterres turned in his M16 rifle and ammunition to Falintil and returned to civilian life Dili. There, he led a national conference of Fretilin leaders to restructure the party, which had lost much of its leadership during the occupation, and to prepare for the party's planned congress the following year. Fretilin carried out its first national congress in July 2001, in which Guterres elected president of the party with 89 percent of the vote and Alkatiri elected secretary-general.

Following Fretilin's victory in the August 2001 parliamentary election, Guterres was elected to the Constituent Assembly, a precursor to the current East Timorese parliament that was responsible for drafting the country's constitution prior to independence. He was sworn in along with the other members on 15 September 2001. The UN Transitional Administrator in East Timor, Sérgio Vieira de Mello, nominated Guterres as the sole candidate for speaker of the assembly. On 17 September, Guterres was elected with 68 of the 88 assembly members voting in favor, one opposed, nine abstaining, and the rest not voting or absent. After taking over chairmanship of the assembly from de Mello, Guterres delivered brief remarks in which he encouraged the body to serve the public interest. The following day, the assembly convened to elect two deputy speakers. Fretilin voted with the Timorese Social Democratic Association (ASDT) and Christian Democratic Party (PDC) to prevent the Democratic Party (PD) and Social Democratic Party (PSD) from taking the roles, and Francisco Xavier do Amaral of the ASDT and Arlindo Marçal of the PDC were elected as deputy speakers.

Ahead of the April 2002 presidential election, Guterres announced that Fretilin would give "unconditional" support to Xanana Gusmão, despite him not being a member of the party. Guterres and Fretilin secretary-general Mari Alkatiri sent a letter to Gusmão on 10 February urging him to run for president either as an independent or with the joint backing of the country's major political parties. Gusmão rejected the idea, stating "I don't want Fretilin to owe me anything nor do I want to owe Fretilin anything". During the campaign, Gusmão accused Fretilin of encouraging people to spoil their ballots or not vote to reduce his support. Gusmão also criticized Guterres and Alkariti for their remarks that they planned to go to the beach on election day as "irresponsible for leaders of a democracy in the making". Guterres and Alkariti ultimately cast blank ballots in the election, but congratulated Gusmão for his landslide victory.

== Post-independence political career ==
At midnight on 20 May 2002, the United Nations Transitional Administration in East Timor expired and Timor-Leste became a sovereign, independent state. As president of the Constituent Assembly, Guterres formally proclaimed the restoration of Timor-Leste's independence, with United Nations Secretary-General Kofi Annan symbolically transferring sovereignty to Guterres as the UN flag was lowered. At the time of independence, the Constituent Assembly became the National Parliament of Timor-Leste. Guterres became the parliament's first speaker, a position he would hold until 2007.

During the April–May 2005 protests, sparked by a government plan to make religious education in primary schools optional, Catholic protestors took to the streets of Dili to demand Prime Minister Alkatiri's resignation. Guterres stood by Alkatiri during the protests, stating that Fretilin rejected "the profoundly political and pre-insurrectional demonstration organised by the church hierarchy". In May 2006, Fretilin held its second national congress, with Guterres and Alkatiri reelected as the party's president and secretary-general, respectively.

=== 2007 presidential election ===
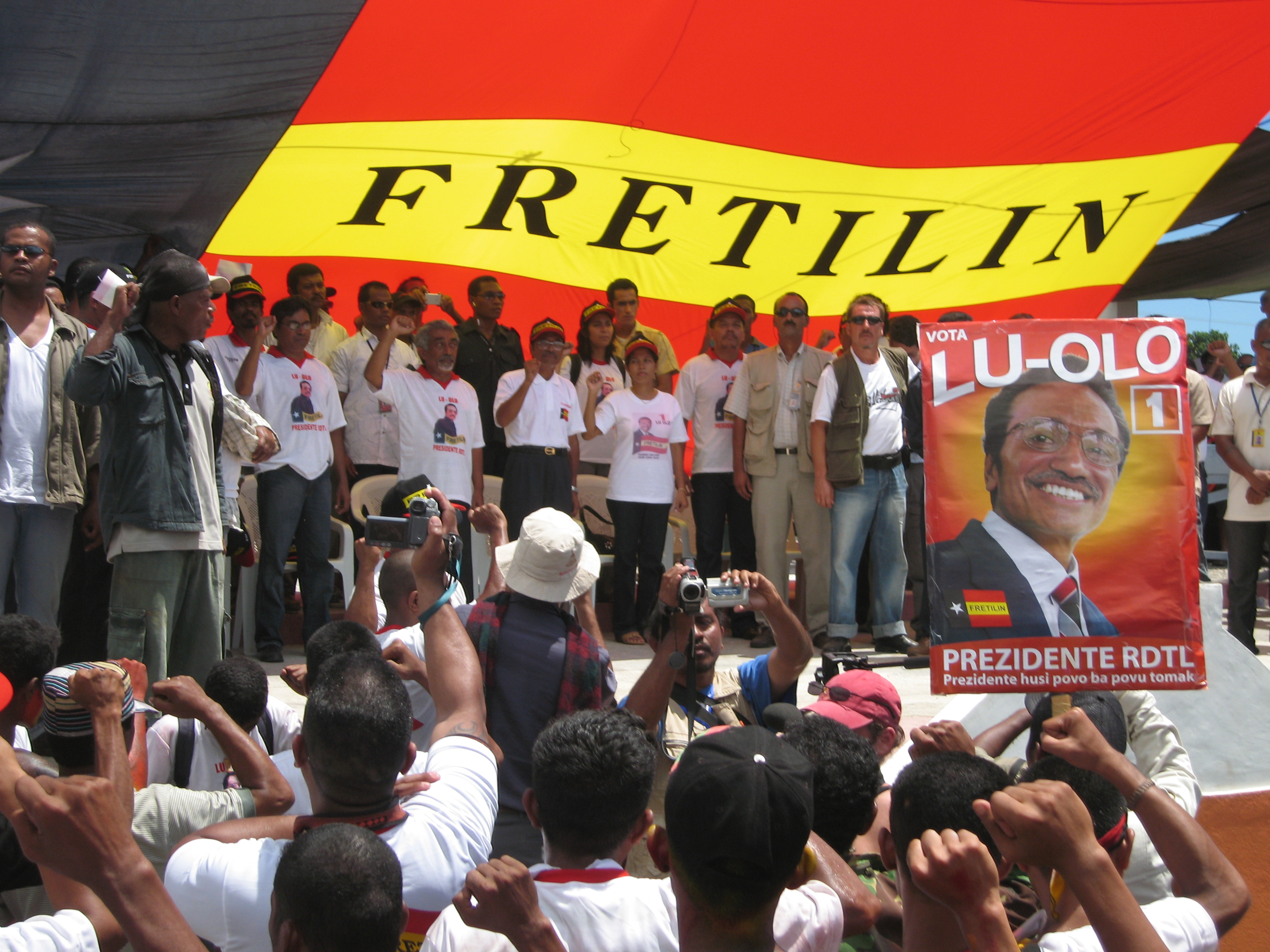
Guterres and Mari Alkatiri at a campaign event ahead of the 2007 presidential election.

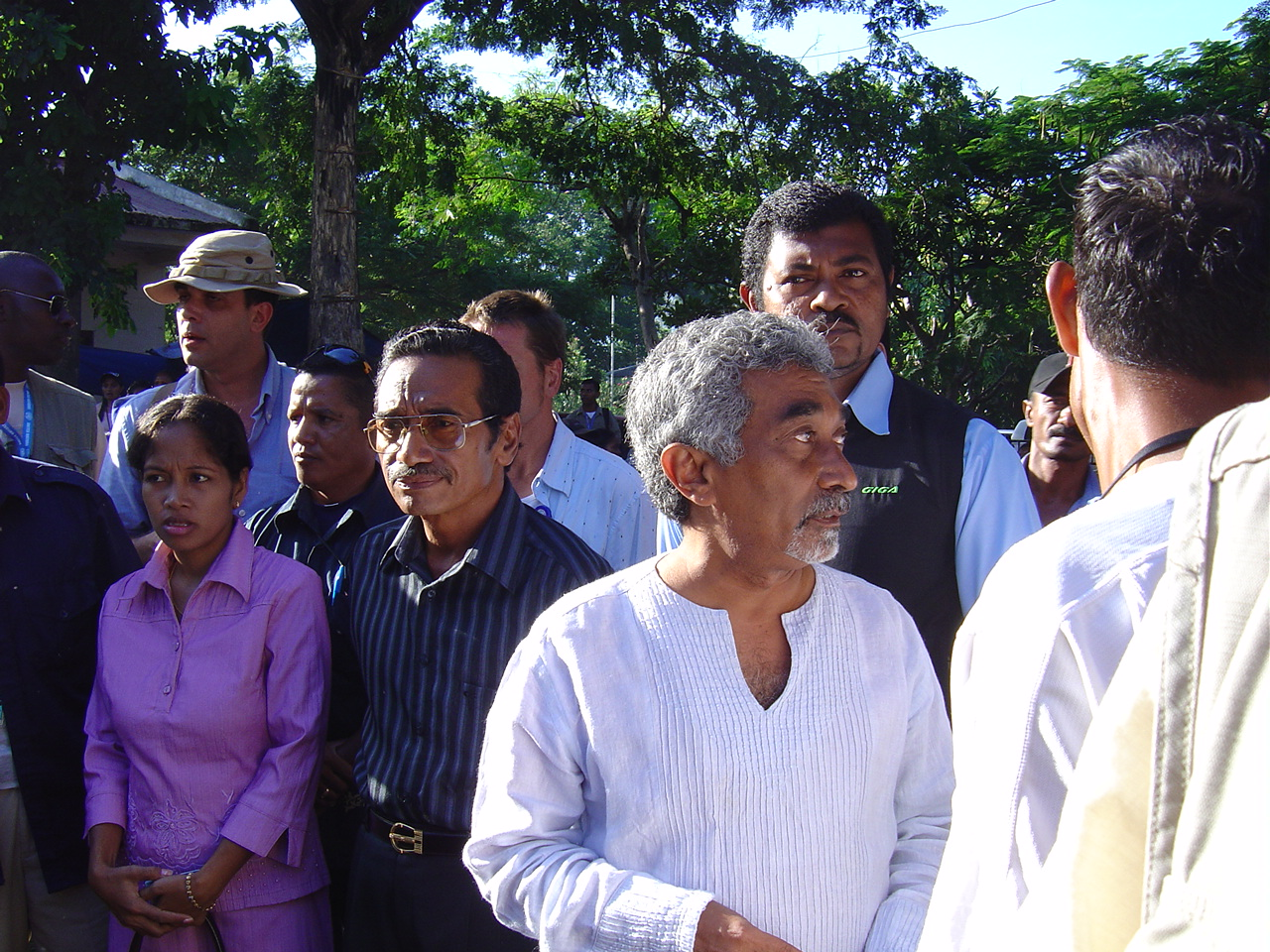
Guterres and Alkatiri on election day, 9 April 2007.

In the 2007 presidential election, Guterres ran as Fretilin's nominee, facing Prime Minister José Ramos-Horta, who ran independently, and a number of other candidates. Guterres campaigned on a populist platform, highlighting his humble origins and credentials as a veteran of the resistance struggle who spent 24 years as a guerrilla. Though he was seen as an "austere figure who lacks the popular touch", Fretilin's campaign materials emphasized his character as a "family man" with children. Ramos-Horta, an experienced diplomat who was seen as favored by the international and business communities, promised to attract foreign investment and use the Timor-Leste Petroleum Fund to promote economic development. Both candidates campaigned on a theme of unity and supported creating a welfare system for the poor, elderly, disabled, and veterans of Timor-Leste's liberation struggle.

Guterres praised Ramos-Horta's diplomatic talents, but argued that his opponent "became recognized because it was our people fighting in the mountains. [Ramos-Horta's] Nobel Peace Prize was not for him but for us.'' Guterres benefited from Fretilin's well-organized party structure and base of support among rural and eastern voters, while Ramos-Horta's campaign relied on his personal popularity and that of his most influential backer, incumbent President Xanana Gusmão. However, after five years of Fretilin rule and little improvement in the daily lives of many citizens since independence, observers sensed a desire for change among voters. Though there were some incidents of violence, the campaign was mostly peaceful.

The question of responsibility for the 2006 crisis was a central issue in the election, with Guterres blaming Gusmão for fomenting the tensions that led to Alkatiri's resignation. Ramos-Horta in turn used Alkatiri to attack Guterres during the campaign, stating that "Lú-Olo is not his own man. He is a puppet" of the former prime minister. Guterres himself was blamed by some for his role in the crisis, leading a breakaway faction within Fretilin called Mudança (meaning reform or change) led by Foreign Minister José Luís Guterres, to support Ramos-Horta's candidacy for president.

In the first round of voting, held on 9 April, Guterres took first place with 28 percent, receiving 112,666 votes. Ramos-Horta placed second with 22 percent of the vote, followed by Fernando de Araújo of the Democratic Party with 19 percent, Francisco Xavier do Amaral of the Timorese Social Democratic Association with 14 percent, and several other candidates who each received less than 10 percent of the vote. Five of the eight candidates in the first round, including Ramos-Horta, accused Fretilin of electoral fraud and voter intimidation and called for a recount. Fretilin denied the allegations and accused Ramos-Horta and outgoing President Gusmão of leading a "well-mounted campaign" of "disinformation, abuse of power, and intimidation". Timor-Leste's National Elections Commission rejected calls for a recount, stating that there would not be any major changes to the results of the vote.

Because no candidate received an outright majority, the top two candidates, Guterres and Ramos-Horta, advanced to a second round of voting. All of the losing candidates from the first round of voting backed Ramos-Horta's candidacy in the 9 May runoff. In the second round, Guterres suffering a crushing defeat, receiving 31 percent of the vote against 69 percent for Ramos-Horta. In a speech delivered from Fretilin's Dili headquarters, Guterres congratulated Ramos-Horta and urged his supporters to accept the results of the election and to avoid violence.

=== 2007 parliamentary election ===
Following his loss in the presidential election, Guterres acknowledged that Fretilin faced a "big job ahead" to retain control of parliament in the upcoming June 2007 parliamentary vote. In the election, Fretilin experienced a large drop in support, winning 29 percent of the vote, down from 57 percent in the 2001 election. While Fretilin still received the highest number of votes, no party won a majority, meaning the next government would be a coalition. Guterres himself was reelected to parliament, his name being first on Fretilin's candidate list. However, he did not take up his seat.

Timor-Leste's new parliament was sworn in on 30 July 2007 and, later that day, members voted to elect a new parliamentary speaker to replace Guterres. Fernando de Araújo of the Democratic Party was elected unanimously, defeating Fretilin's candidate, Aniceto Guterres Lopes. The vote triggered minor protests in Dili—with dozens of youths hurling stones at passing vehicles, wielding pipes and machetes, and burning tires in anger at Fretilin being "robbed"—that were quickly dispersed by police. Fretilin was sidelined in the coalition government formed after the election, which comprised Xanana Gusmão's National Congress for Timorese Reconstruction (CNRT) and three other parties, with Gusmão serving as prime minister.

=== 2012 presidential election ===
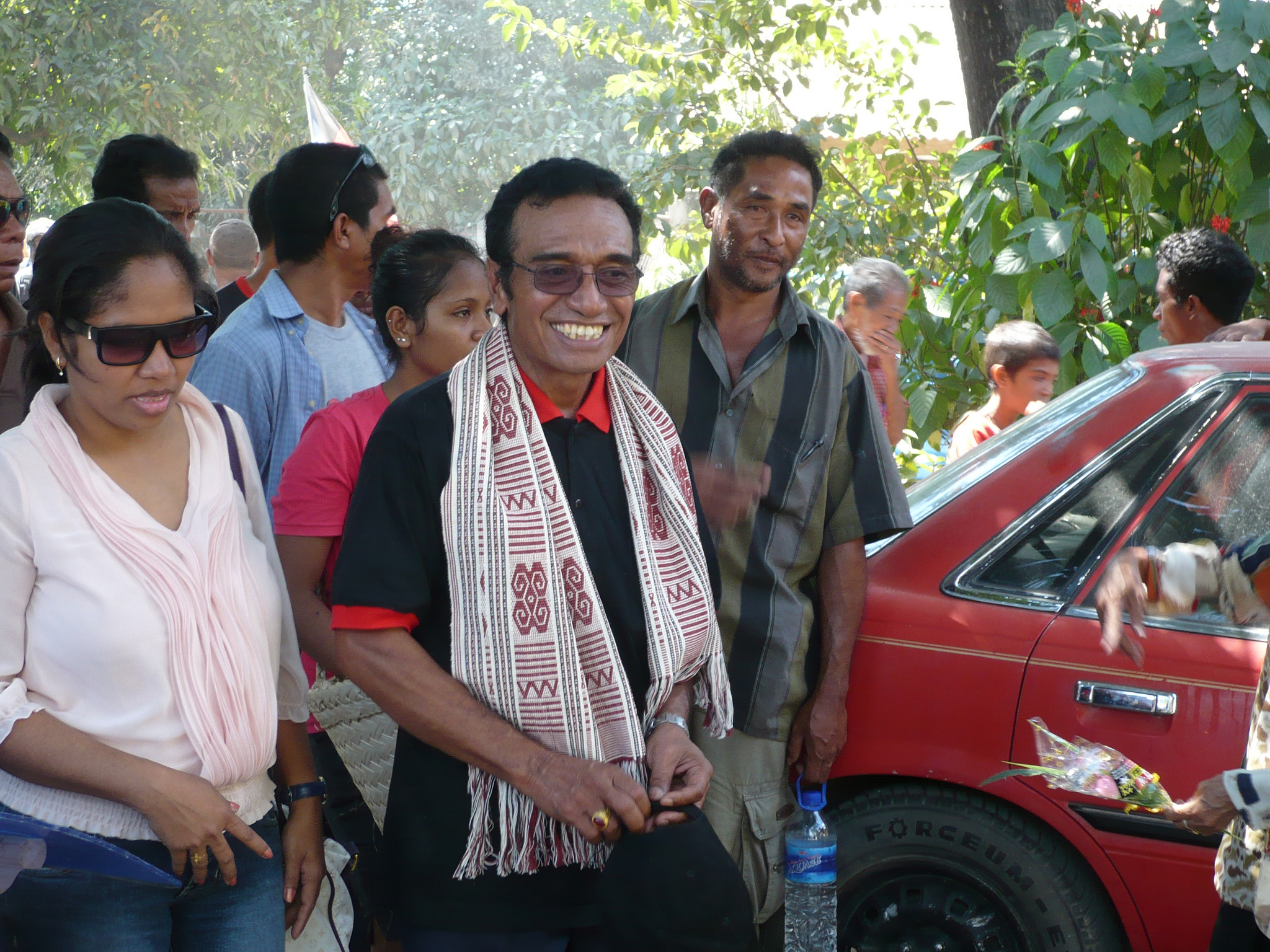
Guterres campaigning ahead of the 2012 presidential election.

In On 20 August 2011, Guterres and Alkatiri were reelected as Fretilin president and secretary-general, respectively, at the party's third national congress. On 10 October 2011, Taur Matan Ruak, the longtime commander of the Timor-Leste Defence Force, announced his independent candidacy in the March 2012 presidential election. Ruak's entry into the race put Fretilin in a difficult position. A ex-guerrilla and former Fretilin member, he was likely to draw some support from the party's base. Thus, Fretilin had to choose between nominating its own presidential candidate and risking a poor performance, or quietly supporting Ruak while losing the chance to run a campaign of its own. Both options presented risks to the party's visibility and reputation ahead of the July 2012 parliamentary election. Despite Guterres' reservations about running against Ruak, he was internally selected as Fretilin's presidential candidate by the party's central committee on 28 November 2011.

On 13 January 2012, Guterres held a press conference at Fretilin's Dili headquarters to officially announce his candidacy. He stated that he planned to be a president for all citizens with a focus on reducing poverty and strengthening democracy and sovereignty. He joined a field of around a dozen candidates, the most viable rivals being Ruak and incumbent President José Ramos-Horta. Ruak gained the backing of Xanana Gusmão's CNRT party, which withdrew its support for Ramos-Horta over his criticisms of the government. While Ramos-Horta remained a popular figure, he was the only major candidate running without the support of a political party.

Even before the official campaign period of 29 February–14 March began, friction between Guterres and Taur Matan Ruak became apparent. At an event in January in Baucau District, traditionally a Fretilin stronghold, Ruak delivered a controversial speech in which he accused Fretilin leadership of divisiveness, comparing the party to a sick calf: "We fattened it, but you have made it thin, and it will be you who will lead it to death." He warned Fretilin's leaders that his "heated" words were only the start of what would be like "a cannon... that can move mountains." He later toned down his rhetoric somewhat, stating in February that he would "embrace" Fretilin if he were elected president. During the campaign, Ruak donned military fatigues and emphasized his role as a guerrilla leader, noting in speeches that he was senior to Guterres when they both served in Falintil during the Indonesian occupation. Guterres struck a less combative tone during the campaign. He blamed the current CNRT government for wasteful spending and entrenching an over-dependence on petroleum revenue, and pledged to promote sustainable and inclusive economic development. He also vowed to respect the constitution and exercise a restrained use of presidential powers.

On election day, 17 March 2012, Guterres voted in Farol, Dili, near his home. In the first rounding of voting, Guterres placed first with 29 percent, nearly the same percentage he received in the first round of the 2007 election. Taur Matan placed second with 26 of the vote, while Ramos-Horta came third at 17 percent. With no candidate receiving more than 50 percent of the vote, the top two, Guterres and Ruak, advanced to a second round of voting. Both Ramos-Horta and the Democratic Party—whose candidate, Fernando de Araújo, placed fourth in the first round—remained neutral in the second round. Several other first-round candidates backed Guterres.

In the runoff, held on 16 April, Taur Matan Ruak won handily, receiving 61 percent of the vote against Guterres' 39 percent. The 2012 presidential election transpired calmly, with very few incidents of violence. Both Guterres and Ruak had pledged earlier to abide by the results of the election and urged their supporters to avoid violence.

In January 2014, Guterres was appointed president of the preparatory commission for Timor-Leste's presidency of the Community of Portuguese Language Countries (CPLP) and the 10th CPLP Summit, which was to be held in Dili in July.

=== 2017 presidential election ===
On 12 December 2016, Fretilin announced Guterres' selection as the party's nominee in the 2017 presidential election, his third presidential candidacy. Guterres submitted his formal application to the Court of Appeal on 4 February 2017. Guterres' application included more than 13,000 signatures of support, the most of any of the eight candidates in the race. Incumbent President Taur Matan Ruak decided not to run for reelection, instead shifting his focus to legislative politics through his new party, the People's Liberation Party (PLP).

On 23 January 2017, CNRT leader Xanana Gusmão announced that he would support Guterres' candidacy for president, calling the Fretilin leader his alin (Tetun for "younger sibling"). He noted that while he was supporting Guterres personally, the CNRT as a party had not yet formally endorsed a candidate in the race. He also denied rumors that he had recently met former President Ramos-Horta in Singapore to discuss supporting Ramos-Horta's candidacy if he were to enter the race. Ramos-Horta, who was known to be weighing a presidential bid and seen as a potential challenger to Guterres, announced that he had decided not to run several days after Xanana announced his support for Guterres.

Following Gusmão's announcement, CNRT Secretary-General Dionísio Babo Soares affirmed that Gusmão's endorsement of Guterres' was personal and that any official endorsement by the party would have to follow a formal process. However, he stated that the party would not deviate from Gusmão's support for Guterres. Natalino dos Santos, the CNRT's parliamentary leader, said that he believed all the party's members would follow Xanana's lead in supporting Guterres for president. The CNRT party strongly supported Guterres during the campaign.

With the backing of Gusmão and the CNRT, Guterres was supported by Timor-Leste's two largest largest political parties and was seen as the frontrunner in the race. Gusmão's support for Guterres was widely seen as a move to solidify arrangements for a continuation of the incumbent Fretilin–CNRT "government of national unity" after the upcoming 2017 parliamentary election, scheduled to take place a few months after the presidential vote. However, some outside observers raised concerns about the democratic implications of an election with no significant opposition.

The next most competitive candidate after Guterres was considered to be education minister António da Conceição, nom de guerre Kalohan, running as the Democratic Party candidate with the additional endorsement of KHUNTO, a smaller party. Other noteworthy candidates included the independent José Neves, José Luís Guterres of the Frenti-Mudança, and the Socialist Party's Antonio Maher Lopes. Incumbent President Taur Matan Ruak, affiliated with the newly-created PLP, initially recommended a conscience vote by his supporters, but later endorsed Conceição in the final days of the campaign.

On 10 February, Guterres inaugurated his campaign headquarters in the Aimutin neighborhood of Dili. At the event, Xanana Gusmão and Mari Alkatiri delivered speeches of support, with Gusmão stating that he believed Guterres would win a majority in the first round of voting and avoid a runoff. Rogério Lobato, the brother of Nicolau Lobato, Timor-Leste's first president in 1975, also appeared to speak in support of Guterres. At the event, Guterres announced his platform, pledging to defend constitutionality, freedom, and democratic values, and vowing to be a president for all East Timorese. He promised to strengthen Timor-Leste's relations with its neighbors in the Asia-Pacific region and to develop closer ties with the Portuguese-speaking world.

The key issues in the election were largely similar to those of the 2012 race, including political stability, veterans' issues, and economic development. Poverty, unemployment, and corruption remained major challenges in the country, which at the time was nearing 15 years of independence. Guterres adopted the campaign slogan "A president for everyone" and promised to be a unifying leader. He promised to strengthen the East Timorese judiciary, combat corruption, and work to consolidate Timor-Leste's democracy. Noting that oil revenues accounted for more than 90 percent of Timor-Leste's budget, he stated that he planned to invest in economic diversification, infrastructure, education, and healthcare. He also pledged to improve education and skills training to reduce youth unemployment.

One new issue in 2017 was Timor-Leste's maritime boundary dispute with Australia, a question that evoked strong nationalist sentiments and carried implications for the country's future petroleum revenue. This issue was seen as a point of a unity for Fretilin and the CNRT. In an interview, Guterres signaled greater openness to negotiations compared to Xanana Gusmão, including leaving open the possibility of refining gas from offshore fields in Australia; Gusmão for years had demanded that the gas be refined in Timor-Leste. However, Guterres' campaign later clarified that his stance on the negotiations was the same as that of the current government.

The campaign period for the election ran from 3–17 March, with voting taking place on 20 March. On 2 March, the day before the campaign period began, Guterres and the other seven candidates joined a prayer rally attended by 5,000 people and sponsored by the Catholic Church. The candidates joined a prayer procession that ended at a statue of Mary near the Dili bishop's residence, before signing an agreement pledging a peaceful campaign. On 3 March, Guterres launched his campaign with a rally in Gleno, Ermera Municipality, a centrally-located town chosen to signal that "there is one Timorese people, no east and no west." Both Xanana Gusmão and Mari Alkatiri appeared at the rally to speak in support of Guterres.

Results by municipality of the 2017 presidential election.

On election day, Guterres won 57 percent of the vote, with António da Conceição receiving 32 percent and the remaining 10 percent divided among the other six candidates. Guterres won nine of Timor-Leste's 13 municipalities, along with the overseas vote, while Conceição took four municipalities. Having won a majority of votes, Guterres was able to avoid a runoff with the second-place candidate. On 21 March, Conceição called Guterres to congratulate him on his victory. The following day, President Taur Matan Ruak congratulated Guterres in a statement, telling journalists he appreciated the "political maturity" of the eight candidates in the race, who complied with electoral regulations to ensure a peaceful and secure vote. The election, the first to be conducted by Timor-Leste without United Nations support, was largely peaceful, with few incidents of violence.

After final voting results were released by the National Elections Commission on 24 March, Conceição visited Guterres at his residence to concede, stating "He was a guerrilla fighter during our resistance time. He deserved the people's trust and I'll always respect him." Guterres then delivered remarks, telling a crowd of supporters, "I'll be president for all people in Timor-Leste, even those who didn't vote for me. I'll keep fighting for peace and unity of our nation." Guterres officially became president-elect on 30 March, when the election results were certified by the Court of Appeal.

== Presidency ==
Guterres took office on 20 May 2017. He became the first president since Timor-Leste's independence to be formally affiliated with a political party.

The 2017 parliamentary election produced a minority government. Guterres called for new elections in 2018, which was won by the Alliance for Change and Progress while Fretilin did not gain any seats.

The CNRT, Kmanek Haburas Unidade Nasional Timor Oan (KHUNTO), and People's Liberation Party (PLP) formed a coalition government until 2020. KHUNTO and PLP formed a coalition government with Fretilin after Guterres refused to appoint ministers from the CNRT.

Guterres ran for reelection in 2022, but was defeated in a landslide in the second round by Ramos-Horta. Ramos-Horta was sworn in as president of East Timor in a peaceful transfer of power on 20 May 2022; the 20th independence anniversary of Timor-Leste.

== Post-presidency ==
=== Death ===
Guterres died at the Prince Court Medical Centre in Kuala Lumpur, Malaysia, on 21 June 2026, at the age of 71. He had gone to Malaysia nearly a month earlier, on 23 May, on an emergency flight to receive intensive treatment by medical specialists. His family announced his death in a post on Guterres' official Facebook page. The East Timorese government declared a week of national mourning from 22 to 28 June, with flags to be flown half-mast at all public buildings. His body was flown back to Timor-Leste from Malaysia on 23 June 2026 and put on display at his home in the Farol neighborhood in Dili, where members of the public and representatives of various institutions came to pay respects and bring flowers.

On 26 June, Guterres' body was transported from his home to the Jardim dos Heróis da Pátria national heroes' cemetery in Metinaro. His coffin was carried by a black military van bearing wreaths and the flags of Timor-Leste, Fretilin, and Falintil. As the funeral procession passed through Dili, tens of thousands of people, many wearing shirts bearing Guterres' image, lined the streets to pay their final respects. Before arriving at the cemetery, the procession made stops at the Fretilin party headquarters, the Timor-Leste Defence Force building, and the Nicolau Lobato Presidential Palace. A requiem mass was held at Dili's Immaculate Conception Cathedral, followed by a final tribute at the National Parliament building before the funeral in Metinaro.

Guterres' funeral was attended by President José Ramos-Horta, former President and Prime Minister Taur Matan Ruak, Fretilin secretary-general and former Prime Minister Mari Alkatiri, Deputy Prime Ministers Francisco Kalbuadi Lay and Mariano Sabino Lopes, parliamentary speaker Maria Fernanda Lay, Chief of Defence Force Falur Rate Laek, former military chief Lere Anan Timur, and Bishop of Baucau Leandro Maria Alves, along with other politicians and civil servants, foreign dignitaries, veterans, and tens of thousands of ordinary East Timorese. Prime Minister Xanana Gusmão, who was abroad at the time of Guterres' death and not scheduled to return to Timor-Leste until 29 June, did not attend the funeral. He released a statement of condolences on 25 June, four days after Guterres' death, and directed Deputy Prime Minister Sabino to organize Guterres' state funeral.

The funeral ceremony began with a blessing of the grave by Bishop Alves, followed by a 21-gun salute. After, General Falur Rate Laek presented a commemorative medal to Guterres' first son, Francisco Cidalino "Olo-Kay". President Ramos-Horta then handed an East Timorese flag to Guterres' second son, Eldino, and Taur Matan Ruak presented a presidential decree to Guterres' youngest child, Dália. Finally, Falur Rate Laek, Taur Matan Ruak, and General Lere Anan Timur handed over a Falintil flag to Guterres' third son, Felizito. Dália also presented a poem to her father during the ceremony. Speaking on behalf of the family, Domingos Guterres called on the government to improve the national healthcare system and to take care of veterans of Timor-Leste's liberation struggle. Alkatiri and President Ramos-Horta both delivered speeches, describing Guterres as a national hero and an enduring symbol of Timor-Leste's fight for independence.

== Personal life ==
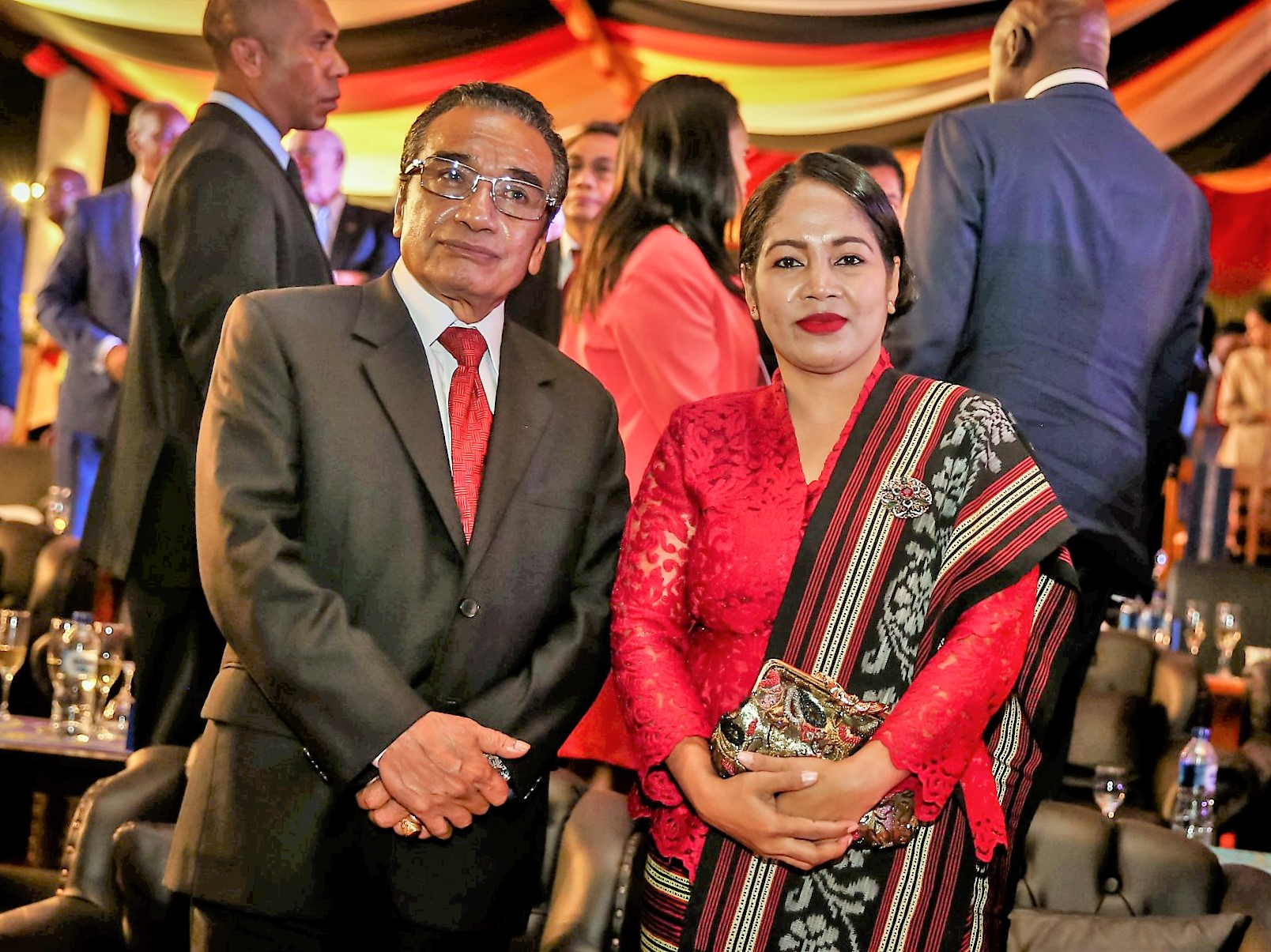
Guterres and his wife, Cidália, in 2019.

Guterres was married twice. His first wife was Clotilde Maria de Fátima e Silva, nom de guerre Lou Tik, a fellow revolutionary and member of the Popular Organization of Timorese Women (OPMT), Fretilin's women's wing. They married in a guerrilla camp near Ossu in September 1978, during the Indonesian occupation. She was killed on 15 November 1981 in an Indonesian raid, while pregnant. In November 2020, as president, Guterres posthumously awarded Clotilde the Medal of the Order of Timor-Leste in recognition of her contributions to Timor-Leste's liberation struggle.

Guterres married his second wife, Cidália Lopes Nobre Mouzinho, an Atauro native, on 4 May 2002. Cidália Guterres was also a member of Fretilin and the OPMT. The couple had four children, Francisco Cidalino "Olo-Kay", Eldino Nobre, Felizito Samora Nobre, and Dália Luliana Nobre Guterres.

Ahead of the 2007 presidential election, Guterres released a statement of pecuniary interests in which he declared few assets. He owned only one home in the country's east, and did not have a bank account or any savings, stocks, or investments.

Guterres was a self-described devout Roman Catholic. He was fluent in Portuguese, Makasae, and Tetun. He knew very little Indonesian, having never learned it formally. He spoke very little English.

== Awards and honors ==
In 2006, Guterres was awarded the Order of the Guerrilla, first degree, by President Xanana Gusmão in recognition of his political and military leadership during the national liberation struggle. On 30 August 2009, he received the Collar of the Order of Timor-Leste, the highest honor awarded by the East Timorese state, from the hands of President José Ramos-Horta. In 2012, Guterres was awarded the Medal of Merit from President Ramos-Horta for his contributions to national peace and stability. In 2022, he was awarded the Grand Collar of the Order of Timor-Leste, bestowed exclusively on heads of state, after completing his presidency.

Guterres received the Grand Collar of the Order of Prince Henry, awarded by the President of Portugal for contributions to Portuguese culture, history, and values, in a ceremony at Nicolau Lobato Presidential Palace in Dili on 19 May 2022, the penultimate day of his presidency. On 10 October 2026, Guterres was posthumously awarded the 2026 Lusophone Excellence Award by Bendito Freitas, acting president of the Council of Ministers of the Community of Portuguese Language Countries (CPLP). The award was accepted by his widow at a ceremony held at the Casino Estoril in the Portuguese Riviera for the CPLP's 30th anniversary.

Political offices
New office	President of the Constituent Assembly; 2001–2002	Office abolished
New office	President of the National Parliament; 2002–2007	Succeeded by Fernando de Araújo
Preceded by Taur Matan Ruak	President of Timor-Leste; 2017–2022	Succeeded by José Ramos-Horta
Party political offices
Preceded by Nino Konis Santana	President of Fretilin; 1998–1999	Succeeded by Mari Alkatiri
Preceded by Mari Alkatiri	President of Fretilin; 2001–2026	Vacant
First	Fretilin nominee for President of Timor-Leste; 2007, 2012, 2017, 2022	Most recent
