= 2017 East Timorese presidential election =

| ← 2012 | 20 March 2017 | 2022 → |
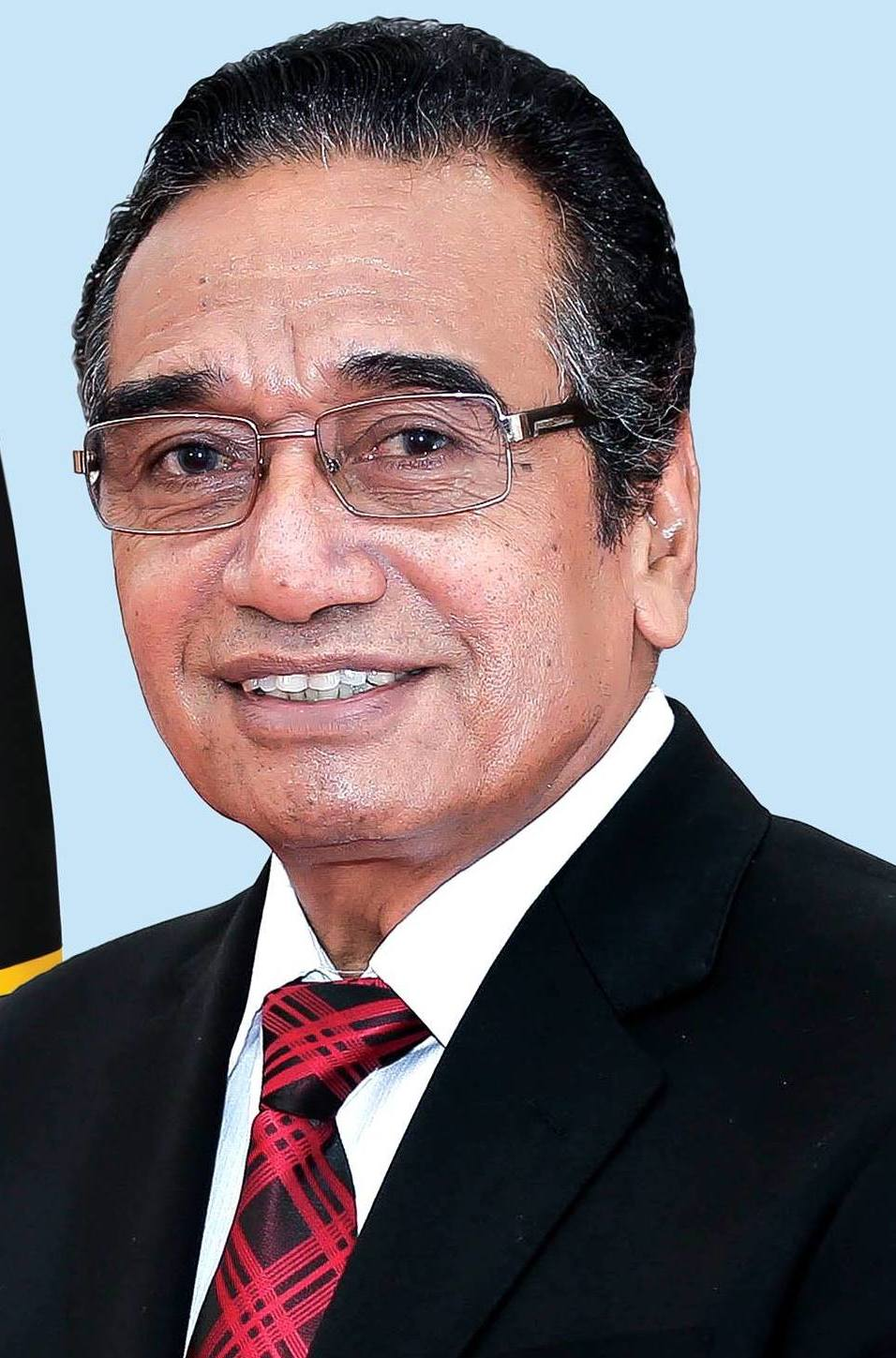

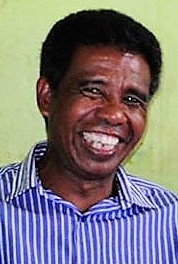
| Candidate | Francisco Guterres | António da Conceição |
| Party | Fretilin | Democratic |
| Popular vote | 295,048 | 167,794 |
| Percentage | 57.08% | 32.46% |
- Results by municipality
President before election
Taur Matan Ruak
Independent
Elected President
Francisco Guterres
Fretilin

Presidential elections were held in East Timor on 20 March 2017. Incumbent President Taur Matan Ruak, who was eligible for a second term, chose not to run for re-election. The result was a victory for Francisco Guterres of FRETILIN.

== Electoral system ==
The President of East Timor is elected using the two-round system. If it had been required, a second round would have been held on 20 April.

== Candidates ==
- José Neves (Independent), a former guerilla leader and was deputy commissioner of the Anti-Corruption Commission (Comissão Anti-Corrupção (CAC)) until July 2016.
- António da Conceição (Democratic Party)
- José Luís Guterres (Frenti-Mudança)
- Amorim Vieira (Independent)
- Luís Tilman (Independent)
- Francisco Guterres (FRETILIN)
- Antonio Maher Lopes (Socialist Party of Timor)
- Ángela Freitas (Timorese Labor Party)

== Results ==
| Candidate | Party | Votes | % |
|---|---|---|---|
| Francisco Guterres | Fretilin | 295,048 | 57.08 |
| António da Conceição | Democratic Party | 167,794 | 32.46 |
| José Luís Guterres | Frenti-Mudança | 13,513 | 2.61 |
| José Neves | Independent | 11,663 | 2.26 |
| Luís Tilman | Independent | 11,125 | 2.15 |
| Antonio Maher Lopes | Socialist Party of Timor | 9,102 | 1.76 |
| Ángela Freitas | Timorese Labor Party | 4,353 | 0.84 |
| Amorim Vieira | Independent | 4,283 | 0.83 |
| Total | | 516,881 | 100.00 |
| Valid votes | | 516,881 | 97.74 |
| Invalid/blank votes | | 11,932 | 2.26 |
| Total votes | | 528,813 | 100.00 |
| Registered voters/turnout | | 743,150 | 71.16 |
Source: CNE
