= Justino Mota =

East Timorese politician (died 1990s)

Justino Mota (died 1990s) was an East Timorse politician and independence activist. His ancestors came from Timor, Mozambique and Portugal.

== Life ==
Mota attended Liceu Dr. Francisco Machado and worked as a civil servant until the Carnation Revolution of 1974. His mother was a religious teacher and a strict Catholic. He was among a group of young Timorese people who began political involvement in pro-independence roundtables in the Portuguese Timor colony in January 1970. In 1974, after the Carnation Revolution had overthrown the Portuguese dictatorship, he joined left-oriented, East Timorese party Fretilin (ASDT), in which Mota belonged to the social-democratic wing. In the party he took over the office of the second general secretary.

In the first days of Indonesian invasion in December 1975, Mota and his wife were captured by the Indonesians. He spent three years in captivity and his wife spent 18 months. There was no court hearing. In 1982, Mota went into exile with his wife and children in Portugal. He died in the early 1990s from tuberculosis, which had already spread through the Indonesian prisoners, in Comarca Balide Prison, Dili.

== See also ==
- History of East Timor
