= President of Timor-Leste =

Head of state

President of the Democratic Republic of Timor-Leste
- Presidente da República (Portuguese); Prezidente Republika (Tetum)
- National emblem of Timor-Leste

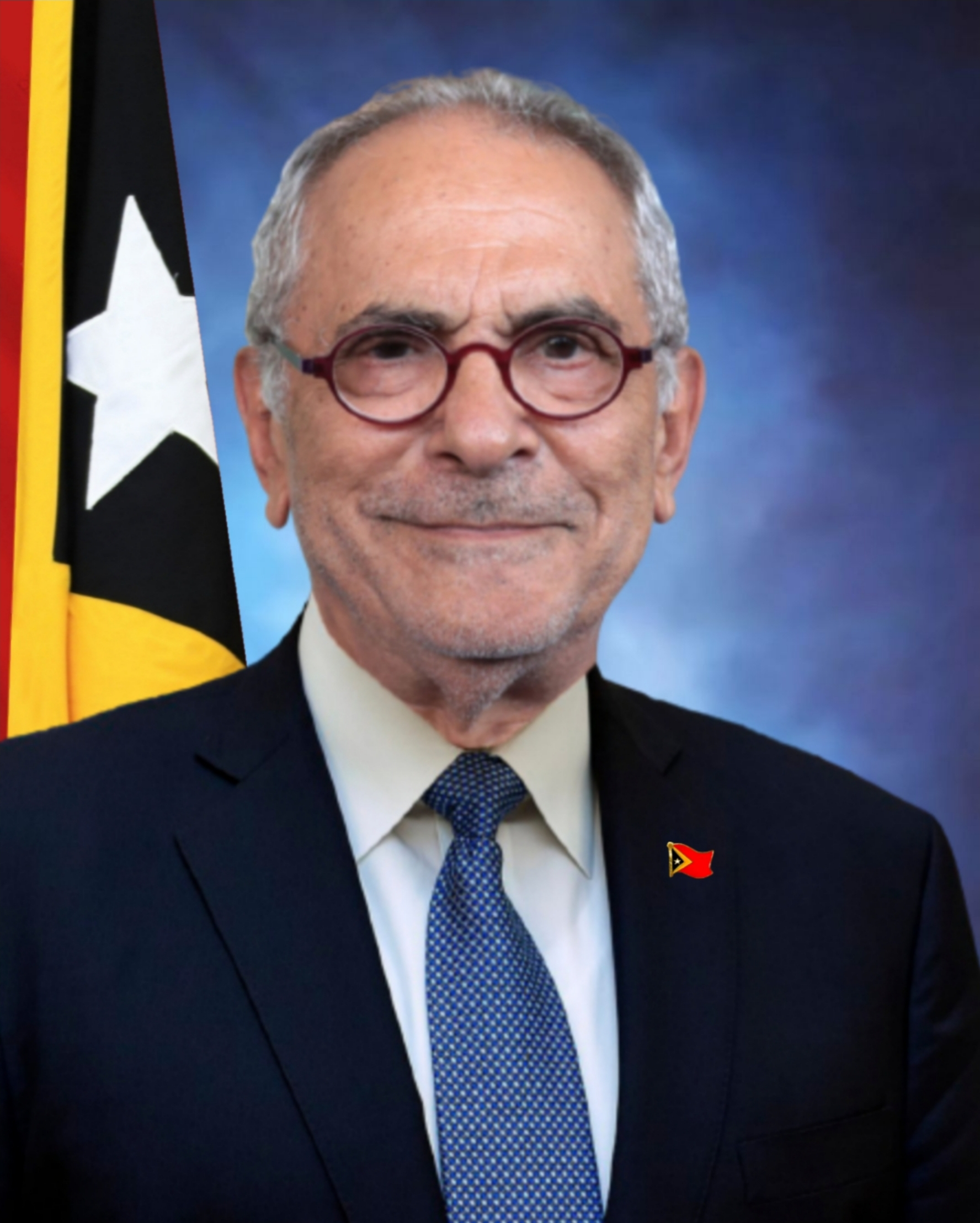
- Incumbent; José Ramos-Horta since 20 May 2022
- Style: His Excellency
- Status: Head of state
- Residence: Nicolau Lobato Presidential Palace
- Seat: Dili
- Appointer: Direct election
- Term length: Five years, renewable once
- Constituting instrument: Constitution of Timor-Leste (2002)
- Precursor: Governor of East Timor
- Formation: 28 November 1975; 50 years ago (Proclamation of Independence day); 20 May 2002; 24 years ago (East Timor independence)
- First holder: Francisco Xavier do Amaral; Xanana Gusmão
- Abolished: 17 July 1976; 50 years ago (Indonesian invasion of East Timor)
- Deputy: President of the National Parliament
- Salary: US$30,000 annually

The president of Timor-Leste, officially the President of the Democratic Republic of Timor Leste (Portuguese: Presidente da República Democrática de Timor-Leste; Tetum: Prezidente Republika Demokratika Timor-Leste) is the head of state of the Democratic Republic of Timor-Leste. The executive powers of the president are limited; however, the president is also the ex officio head of the Council of State, is able to veto legislation, and is the supreme commander of the military.

== List of presidents of Timor-Leste ==
Political parties

Fretilin
National Congress for Timorese Reconstruction (CNRT)
Democratic Party (PD)

Other factions

Independent

Symbols

† Assassinated

=== Presidents of East Timor during the War for Independence ===
No.	Portrait	Name (Birth–Death)	Term of office			Political party	Elected	Ref.
No.	Portrait	Name (Birth–Death)	Took office	Left office	Time in office	Political party	Elected	Ref.
1		Francisco Xavier do Amaral (1937–2012)	28 November 1975	7 December 1975	9 days	Fretilin / ASDT	—	
2		Nicolau dos Reis Lobato (1946–1978)	7 December 1975	31 December 1978† (Note: Killed by the Indonesian special forces.)	3 years, 24 days	Fretilin	—	

=== Presidents of the Democratic Republic of Timor-Leste ===
No.	Portrait	Name (Birth–Death)	Term of office			Political party	Elected	Ref.
No.	Portrait	Name (Birth–Death)	Took office	Left office	Time in office	Political party	Elected	Ref.
3		Xanana Gusmão (born 1946)	20 May 2002	20 May 2007	5 years	Independent	2002	
4		José Ramos-Horta (born 1949) (Note: Incapacitated from 11 February to 17 April 2008.)	20 May 2007	20 May 2012	5 years	Independent	2007	
–		Vicente Guterres (born 1956) ad interim (Note: Served as President during the 2008 assassination attempts.)	11 February 2008	13 February 2008	2 days	CNRT	—	
–		Fernando de Araújo (1962–2015) ad interim	13 February 2008	17 April 2008	64 days	PD	—	
5		Taur Matan Ruak (born 1956)	20 May 2012	20 May 2017	5 years	Independent	2012	
6		Francisco Guterres (1954–2026)	20 May 2017	20 May 2022	5 years	Fretilin	2017	
7		José Ramos-Horta (born 1949)	20 May 2022	Incumbent	4 years, 110 days	CNRT	2022	

== Latest election ==
The second round of the elections was held on 19 April between José Ramos-Horta, a former president, and the incumbent Francisco Guterres. In the runoff Ramos-Horta prevailed with 62% of the vote.

Candidate	Party	First round		Second round	
Candidate	Party	Votes	%	Votes	%
José Ramos-Horta	National Congress for Timorese Reconstruction	303,477	46.56	398,028	62.10
Francisco Guterres	Fretilin	144,282	22.13	242,939	37.90
Armanda Berta dos Santos	Kmanek Haburas Unidade Nasional Timor Oan	56,690	8.70		
Lere Anan Timur	Independent	49,314	7.57		
Mariano Sabino Lopes	Democratic Party	47,334	7.26		
Anacleto Bento Ferreira	Democratic Republic of Timor-Leste Party	13,205	2.03		
Martinho Germano da Silva Gusmão	United Party for Development and Democracy	8,598	1.32		
Hermes da Rosa Correia Barros	Independent	8,030	1.23		
Milena Pires	Independent	5,430	0.83		
Isabel da Costa Ferreira	Independent	4,219	0.65		
Felizberto Araújo Duarte	Independent	2,709	0.42		
Constâncio da Conceção Pinto	Independent	2,520	0.39		
Rogerio Lobato	Independent	2,058	0.32		
Virgílio da Silva Guterres	Independent	1,720	0.26		
Antero Benedito Silva	Independent	1,562	0.24		
Ángela Freitas	Independent	711	0.11		
Total		651,859	100.00	640,967	100.00
Valid votes		651,859	98.16	640,967	99.16
Invalid/blank votes		12,247	1.84	5,422	0.84
Total votes		664,106	100.00	646,389	100.00
Registered voters/turnout		859,613	77.26	859,925	75.17
Source: National Election Commission

== See also ==
- Politics of Timor-Leste
- History of Timor-Leste
- List of colonial governors of Portuguese Timor
- Prime Minister of Timor-Leste
- First Lady of Timor-Leste
