= Fernando de Araújo (East Timorese politician) =

President of East Timor (1963–2015)

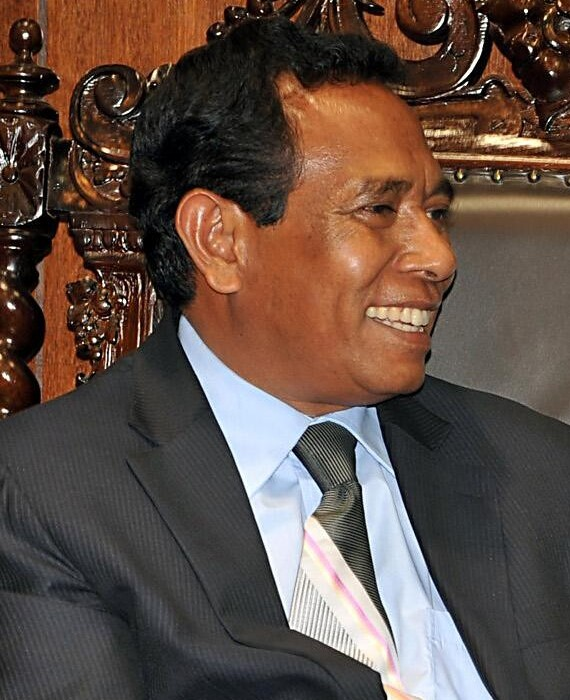
- de Araújo in 2009

President of East Timor
- Acting
- In office 13 February 2008 – 17 April 2008
- Prime Minister: Xanana Gusmão
- Preceded by: Vicente Guterres (acting)
- Succeeded by: José Ramos-Horta

President of the National Parliament
- In office 8 August 2007 – 30 July 2012
- Preceded by: Francisco Guterres
- Succeeded by: Vicente Guterres

Personal details
- Born: 26 February 1962 Manutassi, Portuguese Timor
- Died: 2 June 2015 (aged 53) Dili, East Timor
- Party: Democratic Party
- Spouse: Jacqueline Aquino Siapno
- Children: Hadomi

Fernando de Araújo, also known as Lasama (26 February 1962 – 2 June 2015) was an East Timorese activist and politician. He was a clandestine activist for the independence of East Timor, and then founded the Democratic Party after independence. He was President of the National Parliament of East Timor from 2007 to 2012. He also served as the Acting President for two months in early 2008.

== Background and early career ==
Araújo was born in Manutaci, Ainaro District, in what was then Portuguese Timor. He was of Mambai ethnicity.

At the age of 12, he witnessed all 18 members of his family massacred by the Indonesian Army. He studied literature at Udayana University in Bali, Indonesia. There he founded the National Resistance of East Timorese Students (Portuguese: Resistência Nacional dos Estudantes de Timor-Leste (RENETIL)).

== In Indonesian prison ==
Following the Santa Cruz massacre in 1991, Araújo was arrested for "subversion against the state" after completing his first year of study. In January 1992, an Indonesian court sentenced him to nine years in prison on subversion charges, with the judge saying he was guilty of "disgracing the nation [Indonesia] in the eyes of the international community". He was named by Amnesty International as a prisoner of conscience. In 1992 he won the Reebok Human Rights Award.

He was released from Cipinang Penitentiary Institution early after pressure from Indonesian human rights activists. After his release, Araújo remained in Jakarta and continued to work for self-determination and democracy in East Timor, working closely with Indonesian human rights defenders and democracy advocates.

== Timorese politics ==
Araújo returned to East Timor to work with the National Council of Timorese Resistance in the 1999 East Timorese independence referendum, which voted to make the country independent. He served as deputy foreign minister in the transitional cabinet during the United Nations Transitional Administration in East Timor that governed the country from 1999 to 2001.

Araújo founded the environmental organization Fundaçao Haburas, the weekly magazine Talitakum and the weekly party newspaper PD Vox Populi.

In 2001, he founded the Democratic Party (PD) as an alternative to the dominant Fretilin party. The PD was led by former student clandestine activists, including Renetil members. The party finished second with 8.72% of the vote in the 2002 elections. It has competed in all parliamentary elections since independence and won seats each time.

== 2007 and 2012 elections ==
Lasama de Araújo was the Democratic Party's candidate in the April 2007 presidential election. He took third place with 19.18% of the vote, and on 26 April he announced his party's support for the second place candidate, Prime Minister José Ramos-Horta, in the second round.

In the June 2007 parliamentary election, Araújo won a seat as the first name on the Democratic Party's candidate list. At the first session of the new parliament on 30 July, Araújo was elected as President of the National Parliament, defeating Aniceto Guterres of Fretilin.

He ran again in the 2012 East Timorese presidential election, taking third place with 17.3% of the vote. He was then re-elected as a deputy in the 2012 East Timorese parliamentary election. In 2015, he was named Minister of State, Social Affairs Coordinator and Minister of Education.

Araújo did not stand for the National Parliament presidency in 2012. Vicente Guterres was elected to succeed him in late July.

== Acting President of Timor-Leste ==
Following an attack that seriously wounded President José Ramos-Horta on 11 February 2008, Araújo became Acting President on 13 February.

Ramos-Horta took over again on 17 April 2008, when he returned to Timor-Leste.

== Family and personal life ==
While in prison he met his wife, Jacqueline "Joy" Aquino Siapno, a Filipino academic who was working for Amnesty International. They have a son, Hadomi. Siapno and her son left Timor in 2014, but their divorce was never finalised before his death. De Araújo died in 2015 of a stroke, aged 53.

His fighting name La Sama roughly means "someone you can not trample on."

== Honours ==
In 2012, he received the Order of Timor-Leste.

== See also ==
- Politics of East Timor

Political offices
| Preceded by Francisco Guterres | President of the National Parliament; 2007–2012 | Succeeded by Vicente Guterres |
| Preceded by Vicente Guterres; Acting | President of East Timor; Acting; 2008 | Succeeded by José Ramos-Horta |
