= 2022 East Timorese presidential election =

- 19 March 2022 (first round); 19 April 2022 (second round)
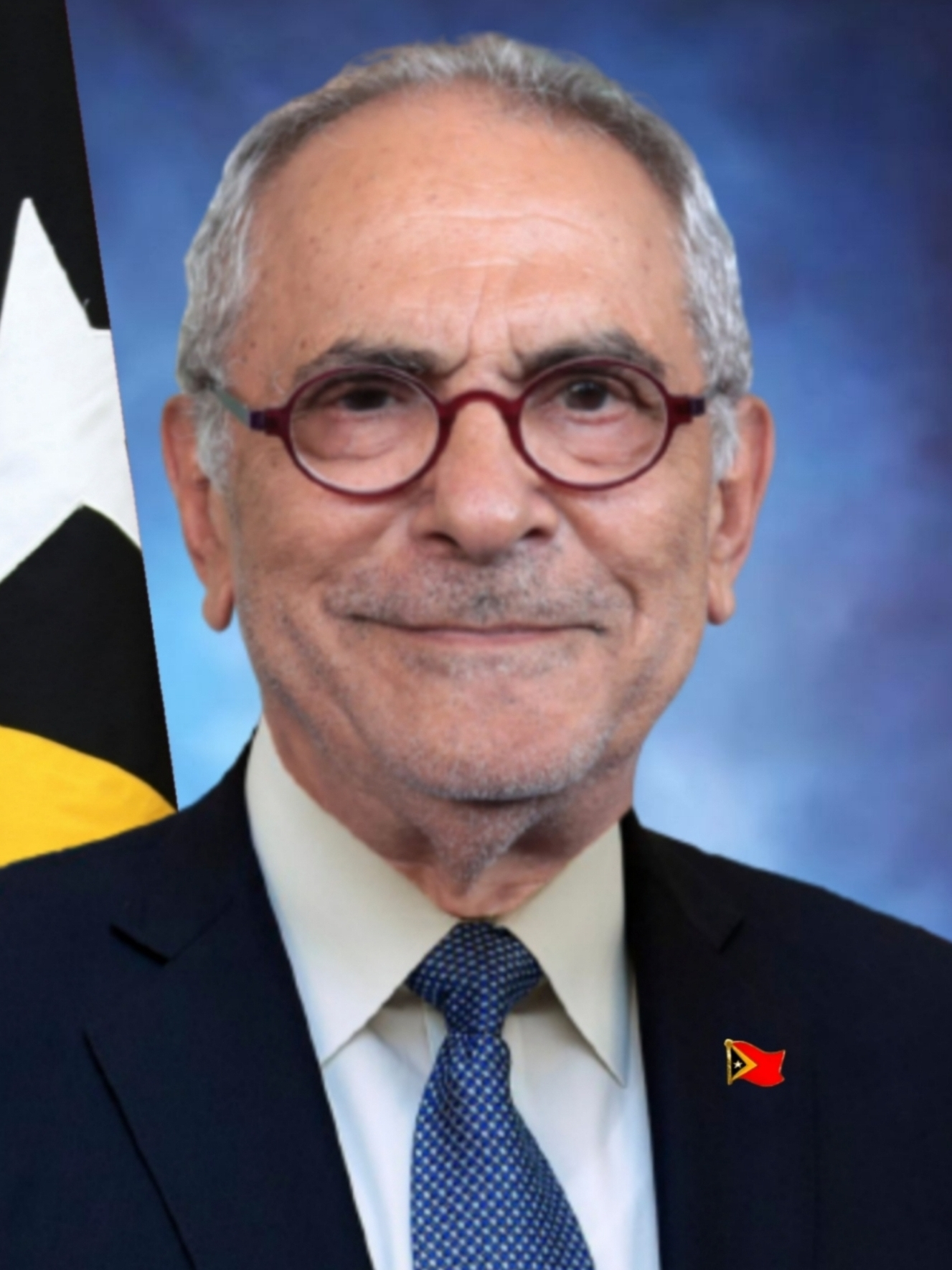

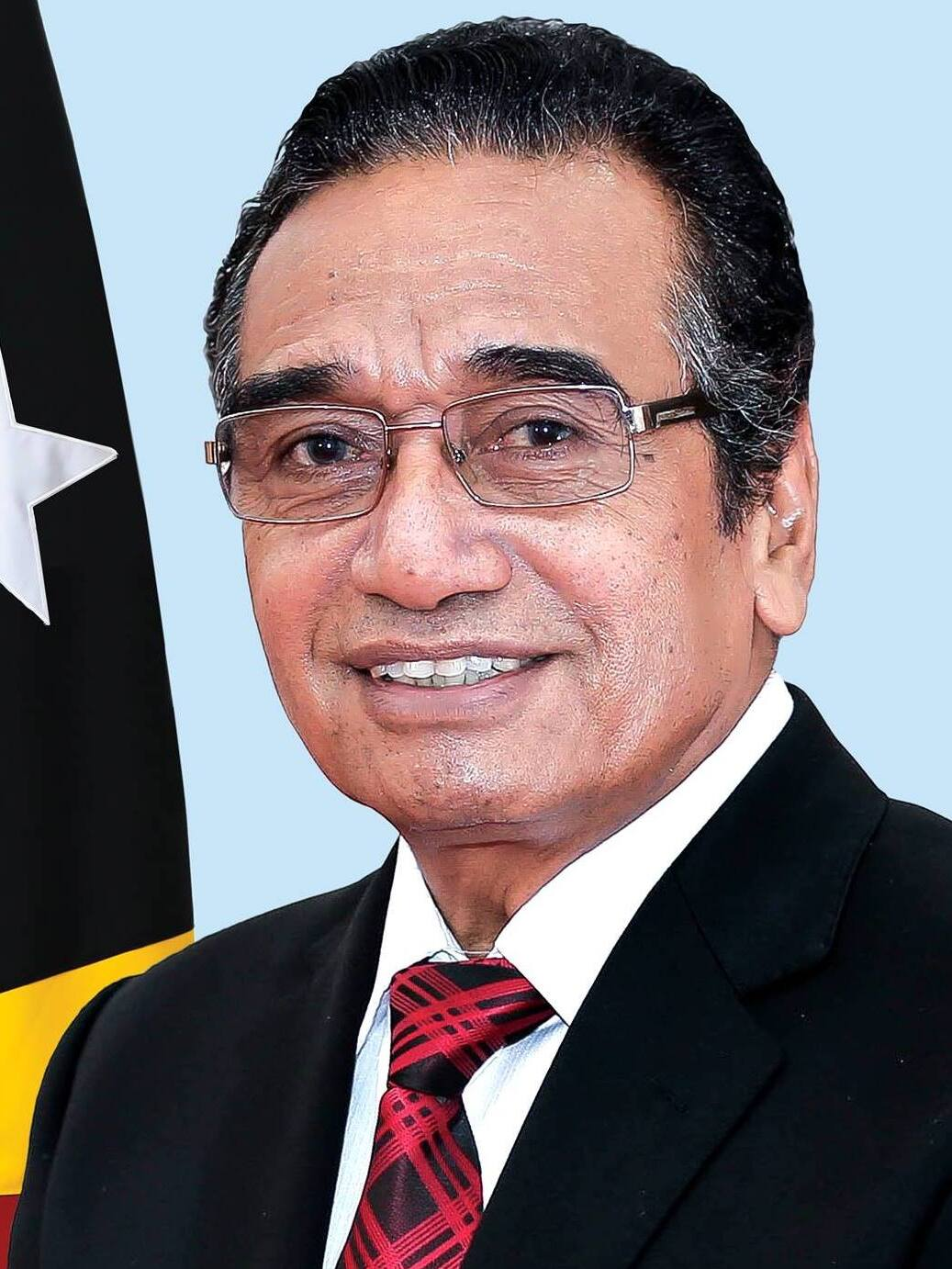
Candidate	José Ramos-Horta	Francisco Guterres
Party	CNRT	Fretilin
Popular vote	398,028	242,939
Percentage	62.10%	37.90%
President before election
Francisco Guterres
Fretilin
Elected President
José Ramos-Horta
CNRT

Presidential elections were held in Timor-Leste on 19 March 2022. Incumbent Francisco Guterres sought election to a second term. As none of the presidential nominees received at least 50% of the cast votes, a runoff was held on 19 April 2022, between the top two candidates, José Ramos-Horta and Guterres. Ramos-Horta won the runoff with 62.1% of the total votes cast.

The election marked the first time that someone had been re-elected to the East Timorese presidency (albeit to a non-consecutive term), as well as the second time that an incumbent president had been defeated – after the 2012 election, when Ramos-Horta was eliminated in the first round. As a result of constitutional provisions which limit presidents to two five-year terms in a lifetime, Ramos-Horta will be ineligible to run in any future presidential election.

== Electoral system ==
The President of Timor-Leste is elected using the two-round system. Formally, presidential candidates run as independents. However, they commonly receive the backing of political parties. In this election, Ramos-Horta was backed by the National Congress for Timorese Reconstruction (CNRT), and Guterres by Fretilin. With no single candidate in the first round getting over 50% of the vote, a second round was held a month after the first with the top two candidates.

== Campaign ==
The campaign was described as "largely peaceful and competitive" by EU electoral observer Ruiz Devesa. Younger voters, with less strong regional convictions and party affiliations, were considered a pivotal voter bloc during the election, being seen as contributing to the third-place finish of KHUNTO candidate Armanda Berta dos Santos.

Incumbent President Francisco Guterres was backed by Mari Alkatiri. Ramos-Horta's campaign was supported by Xanana Gusmão, who was dubbed the "Kingmaker of Timor Leste". The campaign between Guterres and Ramos-Horta was seen by some analysts in the Lowy Institute as a conflict between Alkatiri and Gusmao, who backed opposing candidates. Guterres' previous administration was considered by outside sources to be in political deadlock since 2017. Guterres was perceived to be running a competitive campaign despite his first round result, where he placed second. However, former Fretilin member and fourth place candidate Lere Anan Timur refused to back Guterres or Ramos-Horta. Fretilin ran a campaign stating that Ramos-Horta was unfit to be president, blaming him for the political violence and crisis that happened during his prime ministership in 2006.

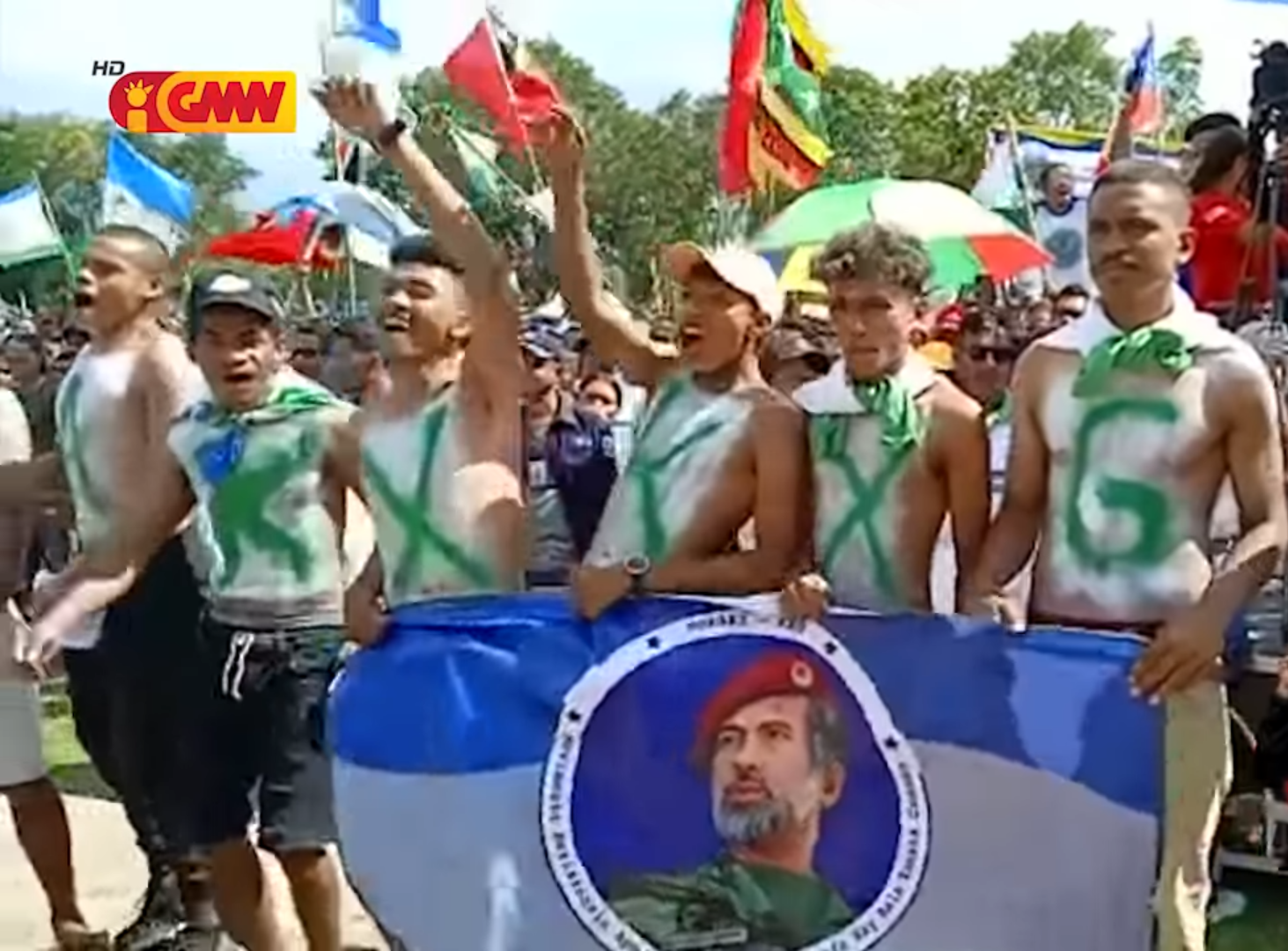
Supporters of Ramos-Horta at a rally

Former President José Ramos-Horta came out of retirement as he stated that incumbent president Francisco “Lu-Olo” Guterres had violated the constitution. Guterres had previously refused to swear in several ministers from Ramos-Horta's party on the grounds that they were currently undergoing legal investigations over corruption. Ramos-Horta stated that in the event of winning the presidential election, he would potentially dissolve parliament and call for new elections. His support from CNRT had been secured on the basis that, amongst other things, he "... , if elected, must restore constitutional order and exercise constitutional powers and dissolve parliament and call early elections." Ramos-Horta ran on a platform of poverty reduction, increasing healthcare services for mothers and children, as well as increasing job creation. He also stated that he wanted to try and improve communication across the governing political parties for the purposes of increasing stability. In addition, Ramos-Horta stated his intention on working with the government to address supply chain issues from the ongoing COVID-19 pandemic and Russian invasion of Ukraine.

== Conduct ==
Andrew Jacobs, the representative of the European Union in Timor-Leste, said an EU delegation from Brussels would be involved in the process of observation for the 2022 election.

The representative of the United States embassy in Dili, Charge d’Affaires Tom Daley, said the U.S. would send observers to oversee the election process. He added that the United States "has supported Timor-Leste in developing democracy since Timor-Leste's independence" and that the U.S. had plans to send observers to ensure the transparency of the election and the freedom of voters to be able "to choose the candidates for the president without intimidation from any party".

== Candidates ==
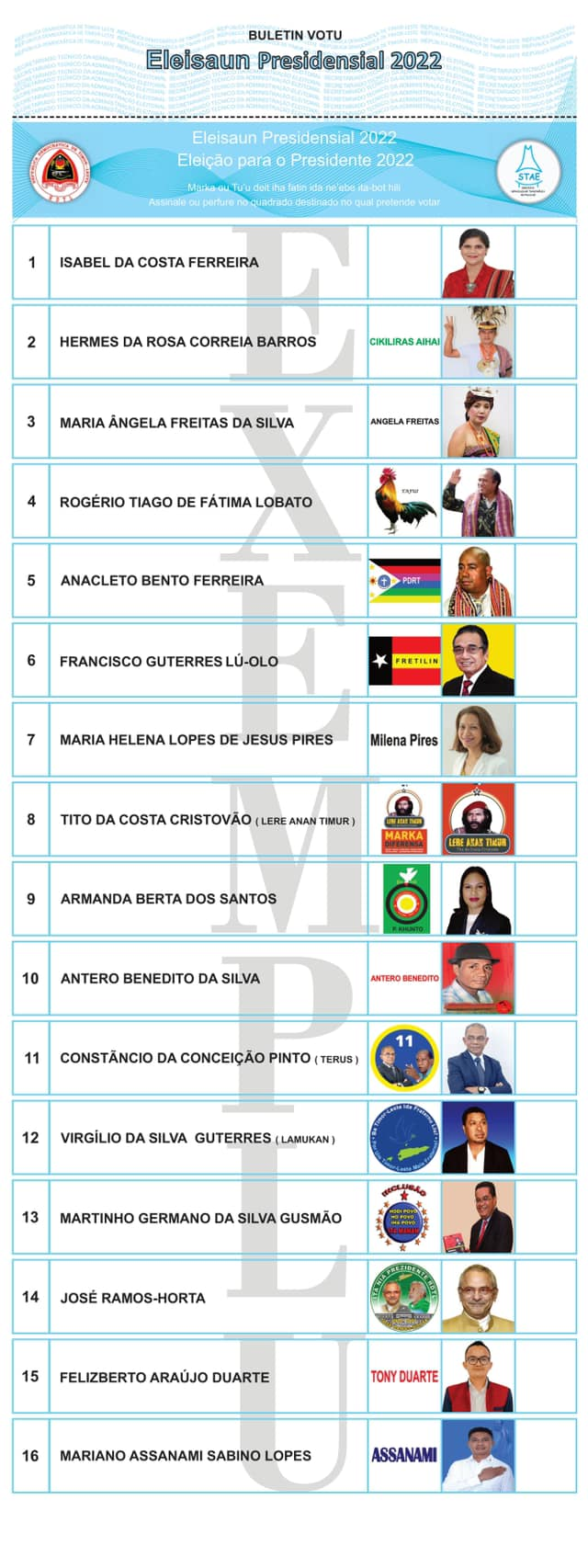
First round ballot for the election.

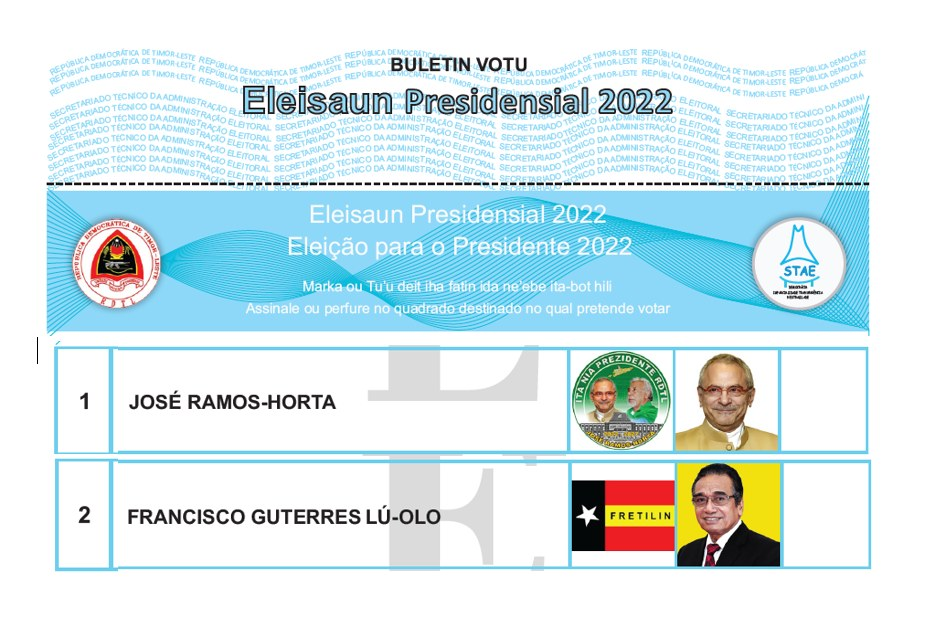
Second round ballot for the election.

Name		Party	Primary	Declaration	Notes
1.	Isabel da Costa Ferreira	Independent	–		
2.	Hermes da Rosa Correia Barros	Independent	–		
3.	Ángela Freitas	Independent	–		
4.	Rogerio Lobato	Independent	–		
5.	Anacleto Bento Ferreira	PDRT	–		
6.	Francisco Guterres	Fretilin	–	January 2022	
7.	Milena Pires	Independent	–		
8.	Lere Anan Timur	Independent	–		
9.	Armanda Berta dos Santos	KHUNTO	–		
10.	Antero Benedito Silva	Independent	–		
11.	Constâncio da Conceção Pinto	Independent	–		
12.	Virgílio da Silva Guterres	Independent	–		
13.	Martinho Germano da Silva Gusmão	PUDD	–	January 2022	
14.	José Ramos-Horta	CNRT	–	January 2022	
15.	Felizberto Araújo Duarte	Independent	–		
16.	Mariano Sabino Lopes	PD	–		

== Results ==
The second round of the elections was held on 19 April between José Ramos-Horta, a former president, and the incumbent Francisco Guterres. In the runoff Ramos-Horta prevailed with 62% of the vote.

Candidate	Party	First round		Second round	
Candidate	Party	Votes	%	Votes	%
José Ramos-Horta	National Congress for Timorese Reconstruction	303,477	46.56	398,028	62.10
Francisco Guterres	Fretilin	144,282	22.13	242,939	37.90
Armanda Berta dos Santos	Kmanek Haburas Unidade Nasional Timor Oan	56,690	8.70		
Lere Anan Timur	Independent	49,314	7.57		
Mariano Sabino Lopes	Democratic Party	47,334	7.26		
Anacleto Bento Ferreira	Democratic Republic of Timor-Leste Party	13,205	2.03		
Martinho Germano da Silva Gusmão	United Party for Development and Democracy	8,598	1.32		
Hermes da Rosa Correia Barros	Independent	8,030	1.23		
Milena Pires	Independent	5,430	0.83		
Isabel da Costa Ferreira	Independent	4,219	0.65		
Felizberto Araújo Duarte	Independent	2,709	0.42		
Constâncio da Conceção Pinto	Independent	2,520	0.39		
Rogerio Lobato	Independent	2,058	0.32		
Virgílio da Silva Guterres	Independent	1,720	0.26		
Antero Benedito Silva	Independent	1,562	0.24		
Ángela Freitas	Independent	711	0.11		
Total		651,859	100.00	640,967	100.00
Valid votes		651,859	98.16	640,967	99.16
Invalid/blank votes		12,247	1.84	5,422	0.84
Total votes		664,106	100.00	646,389	100.00
Registered voters/turnout		859,613	77.26	859,925	75.17
Source: National Election Commission

== Aftermath ==
Nobel laureate and former president José Ramos-Horta won in a landslide victory over incumbent president Francisco Guterres in the second round. Speaking to supporters in a rally, Ramos-Horta proclaimed: "I have received this mandate from our people, from the nation in an overwhelming demonstration of our people's commitment to democracy." He added he had not spoken to Guterres personally after the win but had received an invitation from Guterres' office to discuss a handover of power following the election.

United States Department of State congratulated Ramos-Horta on his election as Timor-Leste’s next president and looked forward to strengthen the partnership between the United States and Timor-Leste. In a statement, they praised the election, stating; "We commend Timorese authorities, including the Technical Secretariat for Electoral Administration and the National Elections Commission, for administering a free, fair, and transparent election and the hundreds of thousands of Timorese voters who cast their ballots peacefully. Timor-Leste’s election serves as an inspiration for democracy in Southeast Asia, the Indo-Pacific region, and the world. This achievement represents another milestone in Timor-Leste’s tremendous work to build and strengthen its robust, vibrant democracy over its nearly 20-year history as an independent nation." Ramos-Horta's victory also prompted the President of Portugal Marcelo Rebelo de Sousa to give him "the warmest congratulations on the election as president of the Republic of Timor-Leste".

Following the election, CNRT changed its strategy on whether it required Ramos-Horta to dissolve parliament and call early elections. Gusmão decided, partly to counter the international community's perception that Timor-Leste was politically unstable, and partly because of the limited time available before the next scheduled parliamentary elections, not to enforce CNRT's earlier insistence on such a course of action. The change in strategy was announced to reporters by the CNRT secretary general, Francisco Kalbuadi Lay, at a party meeting held in June 2022.
