= Isabel da Costa Ferreira =

East Timorese politician (1974–2023)

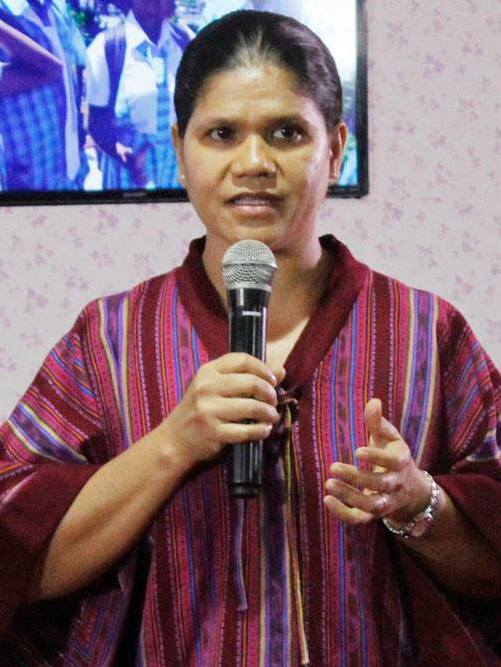
- Ferreira in 2016

Spouse of the Prime Minister of East Timor
- In office 22 June 2018 – 18 June 2023
- Prime Minister: Taur Matan Ruak
- Preceded by: Marina Ribeiro
- Succeeded by: Vacant

First Lady of East Timor
- In role 20 May 2012 – 20 May 2017
- President: Taur Matan Ruak
- Preceded by: Joy Aquino Siapno (2008)
- Succeeded by: Cidália Lopes Nobre Mouzinho Guterres

Personal details
- Born: Isabel da Costa Ferreira; 15 April 1974 Same, Portuguese Timor
- Died: 18 June 2023 (aged 49) Dili, East Timor
- Party: People's Liberation Party
- Spouse: Taur Matan Ruak (m. 2001)

Isabel da Costa Ferreira (15 April 1974 – 18 June 2023), also Isabel Ruak Ferreira, was an East Timorese jurist, human rights activist, politician, and wife of East Timor's former president and former prime minister, Taur Matan Ruak. She was the First Lady of East Timor from 2012 to 2017. Along with her husband, she was a member of Partidu Libertasaun Popular (PLP).

== Life ==
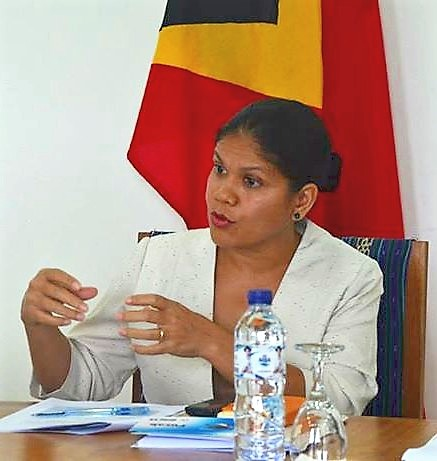
Isabel da Costa Ferreira (2015)

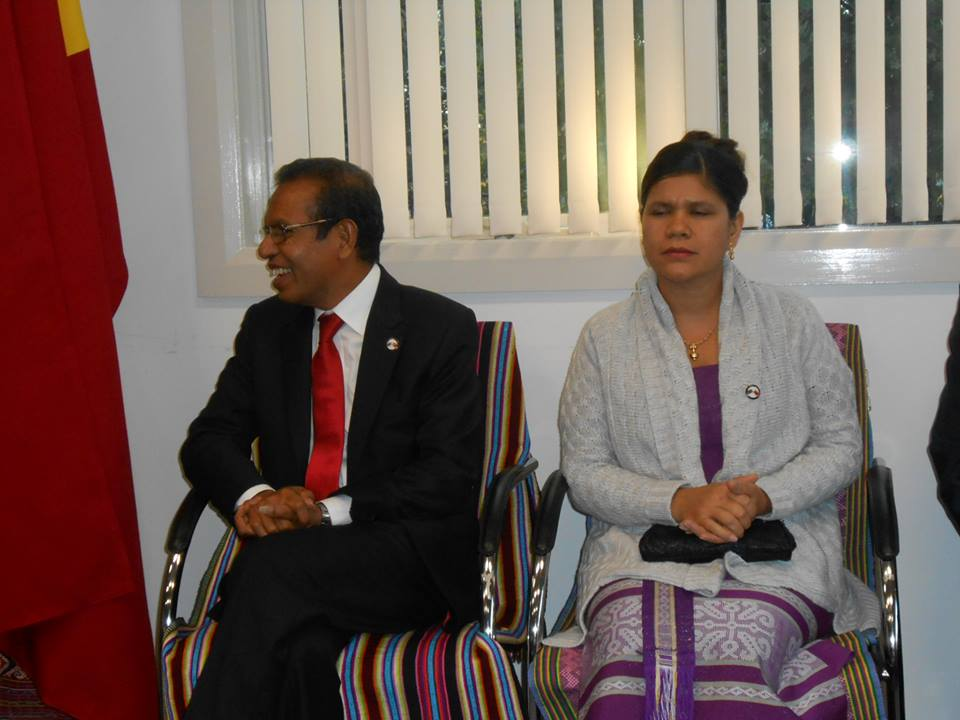
Isabel da Costa Ferreira with her husband Taur Matan Ruak

Isabel da Costa Ferreira, daughter of Mateus Ferreira and Ana Flora de Jesus Ferreira, was born in Same, Manufahi district. The second-youngest of thirteen siblings, she started primary school in 1980 and completed secondary schooling (SMA I) in 1993. In 1998, she completed her degree in law from the National University of Denpasar, Bali, Indonesia.

Isabel da Costa Ferreira started her professional career always linked to issues of human rights, and actively denounced violations committed during the period of Indonesian military occupation. For this reason, in 1998 and 1999, she worked as the General Coordinator of the NGO "Kontras Timor-Timur" and Director of the Commission of Human Rights Timor-Loro Sa'e (CDHTL) in 1999-2001.

In 2001, she was elected a Member of the Constituent Assembly, by UDT, dedicating herself, in particular, to the drafting of the articles of the Constitution of East Timor, relating to human rights.

In the period of the United Nations Transitional Administration and after the Restoration of Independence, Ferreira was responsible for diverse posts in humanitarian, political and human rights, in particular, as Vice President of Red Cross Timor-Leste (CVTL) from 2002 to 2005, Human Rights Advisor to the Prime Minister from 2001 to 2006, Deputy Minister of Justice in 2006, and Member of the Commission of Truth and Friendship (CTF) from 2005 to 2008.

After the completion of the works of CTF, Ferreira was responsible for several areas within the State apparatus, particularly: President of Secretariat of Support to the Promotion Commission of the National Police of East Timor PNTL, from 2009 to 2010; Chairperson of the Commission for the Monitoring Process of Promotions in the PNTL, from 2010 to 2012; Commissioner of the Public Service Commission, from 2011 until 2014; and Legal Adviser to the Secretary of State for Security, from 2009 to 2015; First Lady of Timor-Leste, between 20 May 2012 and 20 May 2017; Legal Adviser to the Minister of Interior, from February 2015 to June 2015; and Children Advocate and Advisor to the Minister of Education & Children Advocate, from September 2015 till 2018.

Ferreira gained further diverse organizational and institutional experience by taking on the following posts: Taskforce Coordinator for the elaboration of the pertinent law on the Provedor for Human Rights and Justice and of the related activities to its establishment (2001-2005); Taskforce Coordinator for the Human Rights National Action Plan, (2003-2006); Taskforce Member for the elaboration of the law for Former Combatants (2004-2005); Taskforce Member for the establishment of the Missing Persons Commission (2005); Member of the Permanent Group for the Government and the Church (2005); Member of the National Commission of the Rights of Children, (2005-2006); Member of the High Council of the Judiciary, (2006-2011); Coordinator of the Commission to establish the Border Management Committee, (2009-2010); Coordinator of the Negotiating Commission of the Supplementary Agreement of the PNTL (2009-2010); Security Sector Reform Committee Member, (2009- 2010).

Ferreira was invited to participate as a keynote speaker in several seminars and international conferences in Australia, China, Korea, Fiji, Indonesia, Malaysia, Portugal and East Timor, specifically, the Conference on the National Council of Timorese Resistance, on Human Rights violations in Timor-Leste, which took place in Melbourne/Australia (April/1999); Participation in the Commission for Human Rights, in Geneva/Switzerland (April 1999), the involvement focused on human rights violations under the Indonesian occupation; National Council of Timorese Resistance Conference, regarding the post Referendum situation, in Darwin/Australia (October 1999); International Conference on Missing Persons, in Jakarta/Indonesia (2001), the involvement focused on this question and also about the situation of Human Rights in Timor-Leste; Invited to the International Conference at the Federalism Institute, in Switzerland, the involvement focused on the "Role of the United Nations and its Agencies in a post-conflict country" (August 2002) and, International Conference on Border Management in Thailand (2010).

Ferreira was married to former President of the Republic Taur Matan Ruak since May 2001. They had two daughters, Lola and Tamarisa as well as a son, Quesadhip.

Ferreira was fluent in three languages namely Tetum, Portuguese and Indonesian. She died of cancer on 18 June 2023, at the age of 49.
