= Democratic Party (Timor-Leste) =

Democratic Party Partido Democrático
- Leader: Mariano Sabino Lopes
- Founder: Fernando de Araújo
- Founded: 10 June 2001
- Preceded by: National Council of Timorese Resistance
- Headquarters: Rua de Colmera, Dili
- Youth wing: Democratic Youth
- Women's wing: Democratic Women's Organisation
- Ideology: Social liberalism Decentralisation
- Political position: Centre to centre-left
- Colours: Blue, White
- National Parliament: 6 / 65

Party flag

Website
- partidodemocratico.org

The Democratic Party (Portuguese: Partido Democrático, PD) or the Democratic Party in Timor-Leste is a political party in Timor-Leste, established on 10 June 2001. Currently, most of the members of the party are of the young generation who are studying abroad, and those who have completed their studies in Indonesia, Norway, Portugal, Australia, New Zealand and the United States.

== Political history ==
In the 2001 parliamentary election held on 30 August, the party won 8.7% of the popular vote and seven out of 88 seats, the second-highest representation in parliament, after Fretilin.

In the April 2007 presidential election, the party's leader, Fernando de Araújo, took third place with 19.18% of the vote.

In provisional results of the June 2007 parliamentary election, the party won 11.30% of the vote, placing fourth.

== Election results ==
=== Presidential elections ===
Election	Candidate	1st round (Total votes)	Share of votes	Result	2nd round (Total votes)	Share of votes	Result
2007	Fernando de Araújo	77,459	19.18%	Eliminated	Lost		
2012	Fernando de Araújo	80,381	17.30%	Eliminated	Lost		
2017	António da Conceição	167,794	32.46%	Lost			
2022	Mariano Sabino Lopes	47,334	7.26%	Eliminated	Lost		

=== Legislative elections ===
Election	Leader	Votes		Seats		Positiion	Status
Election	Leader	Total	%	No.	±	Positiion	Status
2001	Fernando de Araújo	31,680	8.72%	7 / 88		2nd	Opposition
2007	Fernando de Araújo	46,946	11.30%	8 / 65	▲1	▼4th	Governing coalition (CNRT-PSD-ASDT-PD)
2012	Fernando de Araújo	48,851	10.31%	8 / 65	0	▲3rd	Governing coalition (CNRT-PD)
2017	Fernando de Araújo	55,595	9.79%	7 / 65	▼1	▼4th	Opposition
2018	Mariano Sabino Lopes	50,370	8.07%	5 / 65	▼2	▲3rd	Opposition (until 2020)
2018	Mariano Sabino Lopes	50,370	8.07%	5 / 65	▼2	▲3rd	Governing coalition (from 2020) (Fretilin-PLP-KHUNTO-PD)
2023	Mariano Sabino Lopes	64,517	9.32%	6 / 65	▲1	3rd	Governing coalition (CNRT-PD)
