= Ossu Administrative Post =

Administrative post in Viqueque Municipality, Timor-Leste

Ossu
- Administrative Post
- Posto Administrativo de Ossu (Portuguese); Postu administrativu Ossu (Tetum)
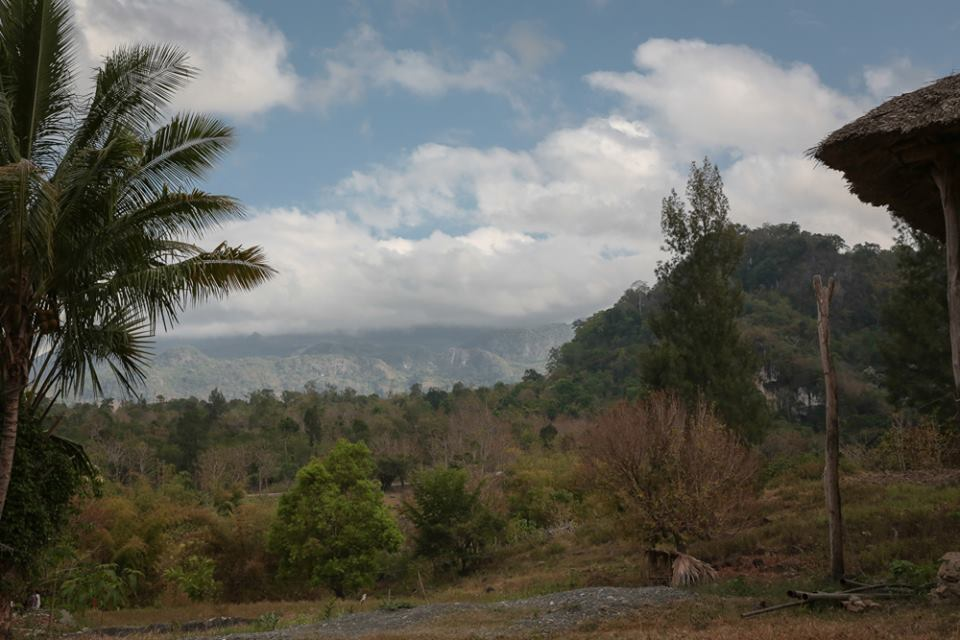
- Ossu landscape

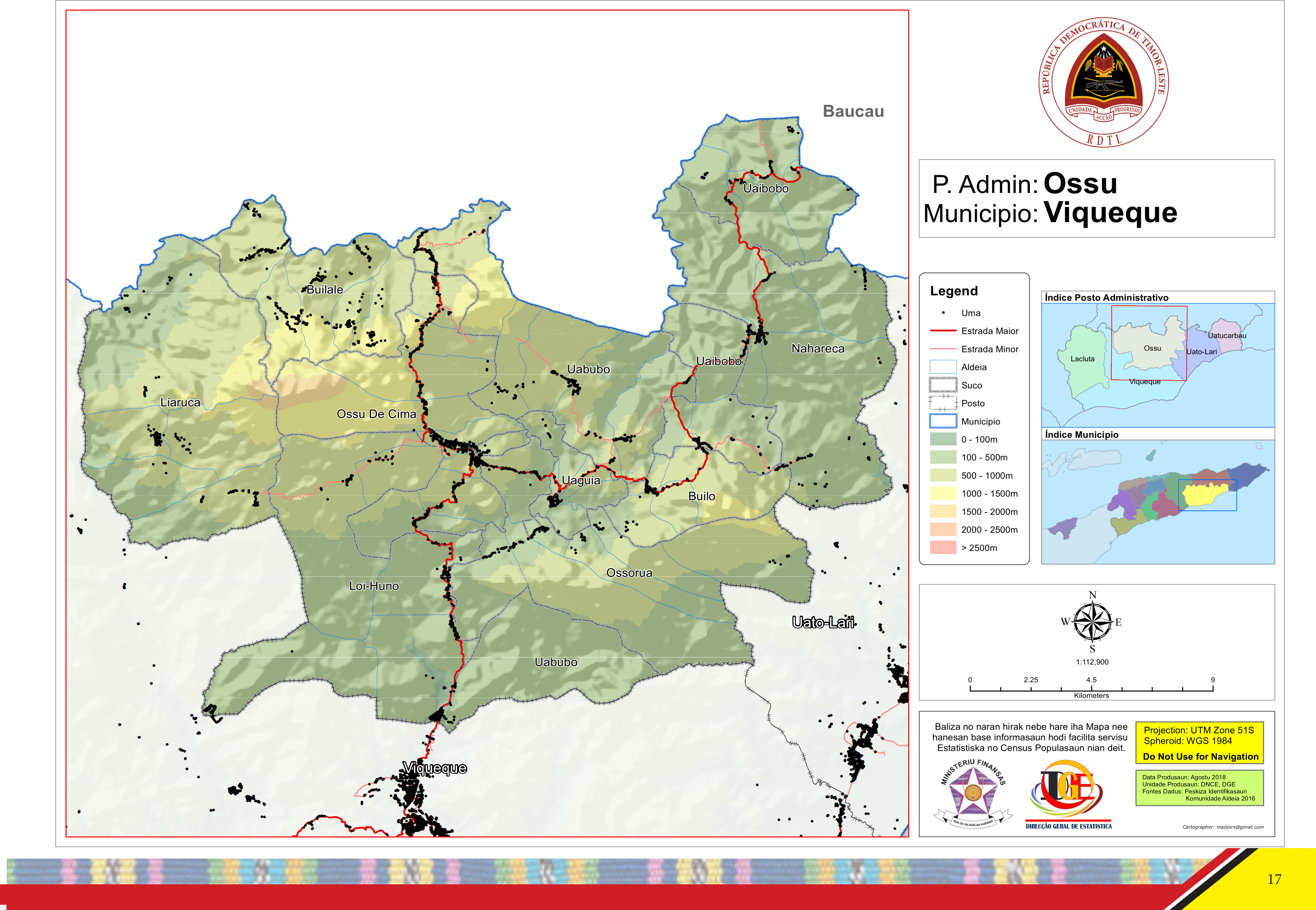
- Official map

- Location within East Timor
- Coordinates: 8°44′S 126°22′E
- Country: Timor-Leste
- Municipality: Viqueque
- Seat: Ossu de Cima
- Sucos: Builale; Builo; Liaruca; Loi-Huno; Nahareca; Ossorua; Ossu de Cima; Uabubo; Uaguia; Uaibobo

Area
  - Total: 403.7 km^{2} (155.9 sq mi)

Population (2015 census)
  - Total: 17,161
  - Density: 42.51/km^{2} (110.1/sq mi)

Households (2015 census)
  - Total: 3,717
- Time zone: UTC+09:00 (TLT)

Ossu, officially Ossu Administrative Post (Portuguese: Posto Administrativo de Ossu, Tetum: Postu administrativu Ossu), is an administrative post (and was formerly a subdistrict) in Viqueque municipality, Timor-Leste. Its seat or administrative centre is Ossu de Cima.
