= Taur Matan Ruak =

East Timorese politician (born 1956)

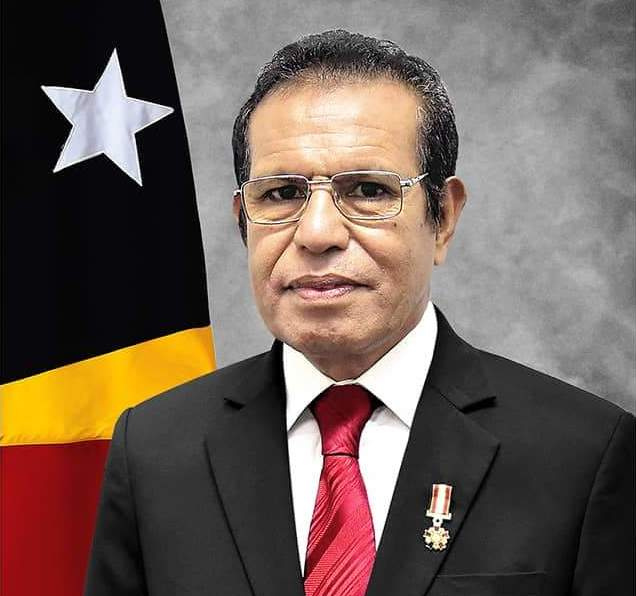
- Official portrait, 2018

5th President of Timor-Leste
- In office 20 May 2012 – 20 May 2017
- Prime Minister: Xanana Gusmão; Rui Maria de Araújo
- Preceded by: José Ramos-Horta
- Succeeded by: Francisco Guterres

9th Prime Minister of Timor-Leste
- In office 22 June 2018 – 1 July 2023
- President: Francisco Guterres; José Ramos-Horta
- Deputy: Armanda Berta dos Santos; José Maria dos Reis
- Preceded by: Mari Alkatiri
- Succeeded by: Xanana Gusmão

Personal details
- Born: José Maria de Vasconcelos; 10 October 1956 (age 70) Baguia, Portuguese Timor (now Timor-Leste)
- Party: People's Liberation Party
- Other political affiliations: Independent (before 2017)
- Spouse: Isabel da Costa Ferreira (m. 2001; died 2023)
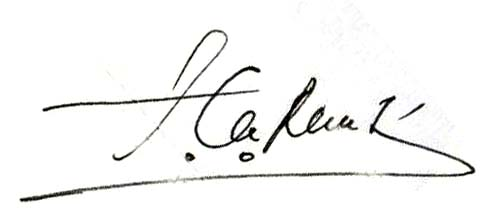
- Signature

Military service
- Allegiance: Timor-Leste
- Years of service: 1975–2011
- Rank: Major General
- Commands: Ponta Leste Sector; Falintil; Timor Leste Defence Force
- Battles/wars: Indonesian occupation of East Timor

José Maria de Vasconcelos (born 10 October 1956), popularly known as Taur Matan Ruak (lit. 'Two Sharp Eyes'), is an East Timorese politician who served as the fifth president of Timor-Leste from 2012 to 2017 and as the 9th prime minister from 2018 to 2023.

Before entering politics, he was the commander of the FALINTIL-Forças de Defesa de Timor-Leste (F-FDTL), the military of Timor-Leste, from 2002 until 6 October 2011. Prior to serving in the F-FDTL, he was the last commander of the Armed Forces of National Liberation of East Timor or FALINTIL (Forças Armadas para a Liberação Nacional de Timor Leste), the insurgent army that resisted the Indonesian occupation of the territory from 1975 to 1999. Leaving the military in 2011, he stood as an independent candidate in the 2012 presidential election and prevailed in the second round of the vote, held in April 2012.

== Biography ==
On 7 December 1975, when Indonesia invaded and occupied East Timor, Taur Matan Ruak took to the hills with the recently formed FRETILIN Army, FALINTIL. As a combatant, he participated in battles against the Indonesian military in Dili, Aileu, Maubisse, Ossu, Venilale, Uatulari and finally in Laga on the northeastern coast, where he eventually stayed. Major-General Ruak's first official FALINTIL appointment was at the end of 1976. From 1976 to 1979, he rose through the FALINTIL ranks in the two eastern military sectors, the Central East Sector and the Eastern Point, or the Ponta Leste Sector. Then he became a company commander.

Taur Matan Ruak and others regrouped the following day at the base of Monte Legumau (Monte Apara) and recommenced guerrilla operations after the collapse of the last Timorese resistance base at Matebian Mountain on 22 November 1978. He was ordered to carry out guerrilla activities in the east after the death of Commander Nicolau Lobato in December 1978. During a mission to locate survivors of the annihilation campaign, Taur Matan Ruak was captured in the Viqueque area by Indonesian Army forces on 31 March 1979. After 23 days he managed to escape and rejoin other FALINTIL forces in the mountains.

In March 1981 he was appointed Assistant Chief-of-Staff of FALINTIL, responsible for the operational command of the Eastern Sectors and later the Central Sector. Taur Matan Ruak was promoted and made responsible for strategic planning of commando operations in the Eastern sector in March 1983. Between 1984 and 1986 Brigadier Ruak was transferred and served as military adviser for commando operations in the Western Sector. After nearly 10 years of operational experience, he was promoted to Deputy Chief-of-Staff. After 1986, he was responsible for all commando operations throughout East Timor.

In November 1992, Commander-in-Chief Xanana Gusmão was captured in Dili. Taur Matan Ruak was promoted to Chief-of-Staff. Ruak became the Commander of FALINTIL after the death of Commander Konis Santana on 11 March 1998. Xanana Gusmão resigned from FALINTIL and Taur Matan Ruak was appointed the Commander-in-Chief of FALINTIL. With the restoration of Independence on 20 May 2002 he became the Chief of the Armed Forces (Chefe Estado Maior General Forças Armadas, CEMGFA) and was promoted to major general in 2009.

General Ruak was married to Isabel da Costa Ferreira from May 2001 until her death on 18 June 2023.

== Political career ==
Taur Matan Ruak played a role in the 2006 East Timorese crisis. On 2 October 2006, the United Nations Independent Special Commission of Inquiry made a number of recommendations including that several individuals be prosecuted. Notably, it found that Interior Minister Rogerio Lobato, and Defence Minister Roque Rodrigues and Defence Force Chief Taur Matan Ruak acted illegally in transferring weapons to civilians during the crisis.

Ruak resigned from his position as commander of the F-FDTL on 1 September 2011. At the time there was speculation that he was considering running for president. Ruak stated that he would make a decision on standing for election during 2012.

He was formally decommissioned by President José Ramos-Horta on 6 October 2011.

=== Election as president ===
A presidential election was held in Timor-Leste on 17 March and 16 April 2012 to choose a president for a five-year term. Incumbent President José Ramos-Horta, who was eligible for a second and final term as president, announced that he would seek nomination to be a candidate in the election. The election was seen as a test for the "young democracy" in seeking to take control of its own security. Taur Matan Ruak provisionally beat Francisco Guterres in a second round runoff.

Taur Matan Ruak was sworn in as president on 20 May 2012, on the same day that Timor-Leste marked the tenth anniversary of its independence. Both Taur Matan Ruak and José Maria de Vasconcelos are official names of the President. Throughout 2013, he made a series of "community visits" in some of the country's most remote areas.

=== Resignation as prime minister ===
Ruak announced his intention to resign the premiership in February 2020, due to a failure to pass the budget for that year. However, he retracted his resignation in March 2020 in order to deal with the COVID-19 pandemic.

== Honours ==
- Grand Collar of the Order of Prince Henry, Portugal (10 May 2012)
- Grand Collar of the Order of Timor-Leste, Timor-Leste (19 May 2017)

Political offices
Preceded by José Ramos-Horta	President of East Timor; 2012–2017	Succeeded by Francisco Guterres
Preceded by Mari Alkatiri	Prime Minister of East Timor; 2018–2023	Succeeded by Xanana Gusmão
