= Fretilin =

East Timorese political party and former resistance movement

Revolutionary Front for an Independent East Timor Frente Revolucionária do Timor-Leste Independente
- Abbreviation: FRETILIN
- President: TBD
- Secretary-General: Mari Alkatiri
- Founders: Francisco Xavier do Amaral; Mari Alkatiri; José Ramos-Horta; Nicolau dos Reis Lobato; Justino Mota
- Founded: 20 May 1974 (52 years, 186 days) (ASDT) 11 September 1974 (52 years, 72 days) (FRETILIN)
- Headquarters: Avenida Mártires da Pátria, Comoro, Dili
- Youth wing: East Timor Youth and Students Organisation
- Women's wing: Popular Organisation of Timorese Women
- Armed wing: Falintil (1975–2001)
- Ideology: Social democracy; Democratic socialism; Left-wing nationalism; 1981–1984: Communism; Marxism-Leninism
- Political position: Centre-left to left-wing 1981–1984: Far-left
- Regional affiliation: Network of Social Democracy in Asia
- International affiliation: Progressive Alliance
- Colours: Red, black, and yellow
- National Parliament: 19 / 65 (29%)

Party flag

Website
- fretilin.tl

The Revolutionary Front for an Independent East Timor (Portuguese: Frente Revolucionária do Timor-Leste Independente, abbreviated as Fretilin) is a centre-left political party and former national liberation movement in Timor-Leste. It presently holds 19 of 65 seats in the National Parliament. Fretilin formed the government in East Timor until its independence in 2002. It obtained the presidency in 2017 under Francisco Guterres but lost in the 2022 East Timorese presidential election.

Fretilin began as a resistance movement that fought for the independence of East Timor from Portugal in 1974 and proceeded to resist the Indonesian occupation of East Timor until 1999. Upon gaining her total independence in 2002, Fretilin became one of several parties competing for power in a multi-party system.

== History before independence ==
=== Ascendancy and destruction ===
Fretilin was founded on 20 May 1974 as the Timorese Social Democratic Association (ASDT). The ASDT renamed itself to Fretilin on 11 September 1974 and took a more radical stance, proclaiming itself the "sole legitimate representative" of the East Timorese people. In response to a coup by the Timorese Democratic Union (UDT) on 11 August 1975, Fretilin hastily formed an armed wing called Falintil, which emerged victorious after a three week civil war. Falintil would continue to wage war against the ABRI during its invasion on 7 December 1975 and ensuing occupation.

Fretilin formally declared East Timor's independence from Portugal on 28 November 1975 and inaugurated an 18-member cabinet with members of the Fretilin Central Committee with Francisco Xavier do Amaral as president and Nicolau dos Reis Lobato as both vice president and prime minister. The two men fell out as the pressures from the occupation escalated, and in September 1977 Lobato had do Amaral arrested for "high treason". On 31 December 1978, Lobato, do Amaral's successor as president, was killed by the Indonesian forces. He was succeeded by António Duarte Carvarino, who served until he was also tracked down and executed by Indonesian forces on 2 February 1979.

Fretilin came under enormous pressure in the late 1970s. From September 1977 to February 1979, only three of the 52 members of Fretilin's Central Committee survived.

=== Recuperation and national unity ===
Fretilin survived despite the military collapse, and was slowly rebuilt under the relatively moderate and nationalist leadership of Xanana Gusmão.

Between March 1981 and April 1984, Fretilin was known as Partido Marxista–Leninista Fretilin (PMLF), and Marxism-Leninism was officially declared the party's ideology. The name was changed back in 1984; furthermore, its revolutionary politics was abandoned in order to further national unity and acquire the support of the UDT and the Catholic Church.

== History since independence ==
In the first elections, held in 2001, the year before independence, Fretilin polled 57.4% of the vote and took 55 seats in the 88-seat Assembly. While this gave the party a working majority, it fell short of the two-thirds majority it had hoped for to dictate the drafting of a national constitution.

In the June 2007 parliamentary election, Fretilin again took first place, but with a greatly reduced 29% of the vote and 21 seats. In the election, it faced a challenge from the National Congress for Timorese Reconstruction (CNRT), led by former president Xanana Gusmão, which placed second. Although Fretilin did not win a majority of seats, its Secretary-General, Mari Alkatiri, spoke of forming a minority government. The party formed a national unity government which included the CNRT, a collaboration that they had previously rejected.

However, subsequent talks between the parties were unsuccessful in reaching an agreement on a government. After weeks of dispute between the CNRT-led coalition and Fretilin over who should form the government, José Ramos-Horta announced on 6 August that the CNRT-led coalition would form the government and that Gusmão would become prime minister. Fretilin denounced Ramos Horta's decision as unconstitutional, and angry Fretilin supporters in Dili immediately reacted to Ramos-Horta's announcement with violent protests. Alkatiri said that the party would fight the decision through legal means and would encourage people to protest and practice civil disobedience. A few days later, Fretilin Vice-president Arsénio Bano said that the party would not challenge the government in court, and expressed a desire for a "political solution" leading to the creation of a national unity government.

Francisco Guterres of Fretilin served as president of East Timor from 2017 to 2022. Guterres sought re-election to a second term in 2022, but lost to José Ramos-Horta. The CNRT was in power from 2007 to 2017, but Fretilin Secretary-General Mari Alkatiri formed a coalition government after the July 2017 parliamentary election. However, his new minority government soon fell, resulting in a second general election in May 2018, which the CNRT won as part of the 2017–2020 coalition called the Alliance for Change and Progress (AMP).

== Election results ==
=== Presidential elections ===
Election	Candidate	1st round (Total votes)	Share of votes	Result	2nd round (Total votes)	Share of votes	Result
2007	Francisco Guterres	112,666	27.89%	Runoff	127,342	30.82%	Lost
2012	Francisco Guterres	133,635	28.76%	Runoff	174,408	38.77%	Lost
2017	Francisco Guterres	295,048	57.08%	Elected			
2022	Francisco Guterres	144,282	22.13%	Runoff	242,939	37.90%	Lost

=== Legislative elections ===
Election	Leader	Votes		Seats		Position	Status
Election	Leader	Total	%	No.	±	Position	Status
2001	Mari Alkatiri	208,531	57.37%	55 / 88		▲1st	Governing majority
2007	Mari Alkatiri	120,592	29.02%	21 / 65	▼34	1st	Opposition
2012	Mari Alkatiri	140,786	29.87%	25 / 65	▲4	▼2nd	Opposition (until 2015)
2012	Mari Alkatiri	140,786	29.87%	25 / 65	▲4	▼2nd	Governing coalition (until 2015)
2017	Mari Alkatiri	168,422	29.65%	23 / 65	▼2	▲1st	Governing coalition
2018	Mari Alkatiri	213,324	34.29%	23 / 65	0	▼2nd	Opposition (until 2020)
2018	Mari Alkatiri	213,324	34.29%	23 / 65	0	▼2nd	Governing coalition (from 2020)
2023	Mari Alkatiri	178,338	25.75%	19 / 65	▼4	2nd	Opposition

== See also ==
- Free Aceh Movement
- Free Papua Movement
- Republik Maluku Selatan
- Separatism
- List of political parties in Timor-Leste
- Category:Fretilin politicians
