= Guido Valadares National Hospital =

National hospital of East Timor

- Hospital Nacional Guido Valadares (Portuguese); Óspital Nasionál Guido Valadares (Tetum)
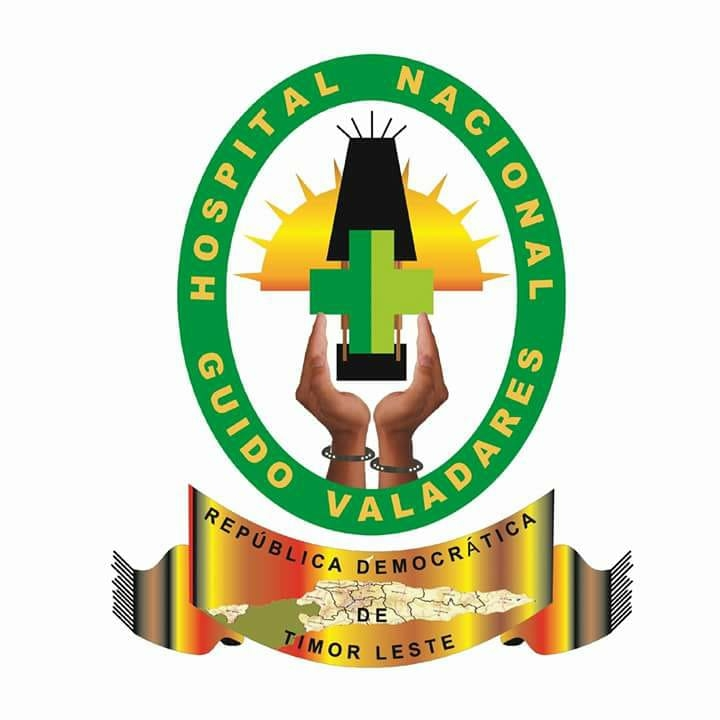

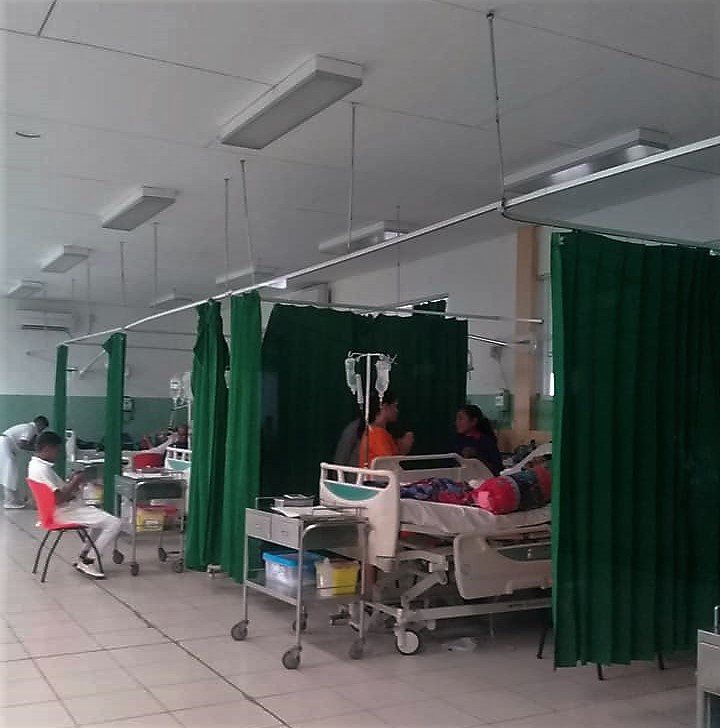
- Emergency ward of the hospital

Geography
- Location: Avenida Dom Martinho Lopes, Culu Hun, Cristo Rei, Dili, Timor-Leste
- Coordinates: 8°33′21″S 125°35′35″E

Organisation
- Care system: Public
- Type: District General

Services
- Beds: 260–340

History
- Former names: Rumah Sakit Umum Pusat Dili; (Dili Central General Hospital); Dili National Hospital
- Opened: 1982 / 1983

Guido Valadares National Hospital (Portuguese: Hospital Nacional Guido Valadares, Tetum: Óspital Nasionál Guido Valadares) (HNGV), formerly Dili National Hospital, is the Public hospital of Timor-Leste. It is located in Culu Hun, on the eastern edge of the capital city of Dili.

== History ==
The hospital was founded in 1982 by the then Indonesian administration of East Timor, and was built the following year. Initially, its name, in Indonesian, was Rumah Sakit Umum Pusat Dili (RSUP) (transl. Dili Central General Hospital); it was also known, in English, as the Dili National Hospital.

As a consequence of the 1999 crisis that led ultimately to East Timorese independence from Indonesia, the hospital was taken over by the International Committee of the Red Cross (ICRC), which managed it until 2003, a period that included a year-long preparation for hand over. During that period, the IRC and the government of East Timor cooperated in upgrading the hospital, including by expanding the number of wards and units, recruiting more staff, and improving medical and non-medical equipment.

From 2000, the United Nations Population Fund (UNFPA) assisted the hospital, by providing it with medical equipment, and in building the capacity of health staff to practice obstetrics and gynaecology, to help address the problem of high maternal mortality and other reproductive health issues.

At the same time, the Ministry of Health took steps to recruit health workers to displace those who had fled East Timor during the 1999 crisis; of the 126 doctors who had been working there in 1999, only 26 had remained in the entire country. By 2001, the Ministry had recruited 724 health workers, but as they included few higher-level trained specialists, the national hospital still had a 96% vacancy rate.

The ICRC officially handed the hospital over to the government of Timor-Leste on 29 June 2003. During the handover ceremony, Mari Alkatiri, Prime Minister of the country's first constitutional government, inaugurated several new buildings, and announced that government had officially renamed the hospital after Guido Valadares, a former member of the Fretilin National Committee and the Vice-Minister of Labor and Social Welfare in the Council of Ministers formed by Fretilin in 1975.

On 15 November 2005, Alkatiri launched a €5.9 million project for the improvement of the hospital. The project, co-financed by the government and the European Union, and scheduled for completion in October 2007, included thorough rehabilitation of the hospital complex and construction of a new operating theatre. During the launching ceremony, Alkatiri also underlined the important role that was being played by Cuba and China in staffing the hospital.

As of 2011, HNGV had 260 beds, with secondary and tertiary healthcare services. By 2014, the number of beds had increased to 340, extending over 14 wards and units; the hospital also had 581 staff, both international and local.

Also in 2014, an external accreditation assessment was carried out at the hospital using the International Finance Corporation (IFC) Hospital Readiness Accreditation survey tool. The score that year was only 5.7%; the assessment has been carried out annually ever since, to monitor improvement.

The same year, a functional analysis of HNGV carried out for the Ministry of Health concluded that management capacities were very low at all levels, with upper and middle managers having no formal educational background in management. Consequently, work organisation was very poor, as was the quality of control and supervision. Middle management and staff were generally demotivated.

According to the report of the functional analysis, poor leadership at the hospital was affecting its entire management structure. The vast majority of the people interviewed by the report's authors had said that the global situation at the hospital had been deteriorating for years, and that the deterioration had accelerated since 2011. Upper management had not been sympathetic to that view, and, in turn, had made complaints of their own about the oversight of the hospital by the Ministry.

The upper management structure at HNGV was the same as a 50 bed hospital, and the report's authors considered a revised structure HNGV was proposing to the Ministry would be worse. Additionally, there were daily major breaches of most elementary hygiene and infection prevention rules, and nobody at the hospital seemed to care. The report's recommendations included a drastic change in leadership of the hospital, an improvement in management capacities, alterations to staffing practices, work organisation, supervision and control, and increased systematisation.

After considering the report, the Ministry developed a four day training program to promote good governance of hospitals. The program was held at a number of venues, including four of Timor-Leste's regional reference hospitals, and then, in mid-October 2016, was carried out at HNGV.

The following year, 2017, the government of Japan agreed to provide HNGV with a variety of medical equipment worth 200 million yen (approximately US$1.83 million). The aim of the grant aid was to improve HNGV's healthcare service, especially for patients needing emergency or obstetrics and gynaecology care. That year's IFC Hospital Readiness Accreditation survey score was 26%; additionally, a group of researchers carried out an analysis of drug management in the hospital's department of pharmacy. The result of that analysis, which was not published until 2020, indicated that most of the management systems did not yet comply with the applicable standards.

Meanwhile, on 16 April 2019, the Deputy Minister of Primary Health Care, Élia dos Reis Amaral, swore in 17 new HNGV Heads of Department.

During the COVID-19 pandemic in 2020 and 2021, HNGV reported that it had a number of strengths relating to maintenance of quality, including leadership, an established quality team, a multi-disciplinary Quality and Safety Committee, an appropriate hospital motto ("Excellence in service, commitment, compassion and knowledge"), and motivated staff. Additionally, the HNGV quality team was involved in training at the country's five other referral hospitals, and patient satisfaction with HNGV increased from 77% in 2019 to 89% in 2021. On the other hand, there was a large pandemic-related decrease in visits to the outpatient department and the emergency room, caused mainly by a "lack of trust" in the health system and "increased fear" of the hospital during the pandemic.

A further consequence of the COVID-19 pandemic was the donation in July–August 2021 by the ICRC to Cruz Vermelha de Timor-Leste (transl. Red Cross of Timor-Leste) (CVTL) and HNGV of more than 115,000 items of personal protective equipment (PPE) and sanitation materials. As the national COVID-19 referral hospital, HNGV not only treated COVID-19 patients, but also supplied equipment, including materials donated by the ICRC, and personnel, to other health care providers that were treating the disease in East Timor.

In early 2022, the Royal Australasian College of Surgeons engaged a consultant to develop a strategic plan to improve the clinical education function at HNGV, and support the positioning of the facility as a national teaching hospital over the longer term.

On 24 June 2022, a mobile intensive care unit (ICU) arrived in Timor-Leste to be located at HNGV. It had been donated by the American people, as part of US$20 million provided to support Timor-Leste's health security. The first unit of the ICU was a 9-bed supplement to the 25 ICU beds with which the hospital was already equipped. Later that year, on 5 October 2022, the government's Council of Ministers approved a proposal by the Minister of Health, Odete Maria Freitas Belo, for the construction of a five-storey Paediatric and Coronary Intensive Care Unit at HNGV. It was expected that the unit would improve specialised quality care for emergency and urgent paedriatic cases, and also the national response to emerging and sporadic outbreaks of diseases with major public health impacts, including dengue fever and cholera.

The foundation stone for the new ICU building was laid by the Prime Minister, Taur Matan Ruak, on 26 January 2023. During the stone laying ceremony, Belo said that the facility would take two years to construct, and, when completed, would accommodate 327 beds, 81 midwives, and 163 nurses.

== Description ==
=== Overview ===
HNGV is located in Culu Hun, on the eastern edge of the capital city of Dili. It is the largest hospital in Timor-Leste, and the only national referral hospital providing primary and secondary care to patients from all over the country, in what is a challenging resource-limited environment.

=== Functions ===
At a meeting held on 21 September 2015, the government's Council of Ministers resolved as follows:

The government has formalised the recognition of Guido Valadares National Hospital as a hospital that provides secondary and tertiary healthcare services to patients forwarded by regional hospitals from all of the national territory. The hospital is endowed of legal personality and administrative, financial and asset autonomy, integrated in the indirect administration of the State.

In particular, HNGV provides the secondary health services for five of the nation's municipalities; at a further meeting of the Council of Ministers, held on 10 May 2016, it was determined that "... the hospital is to ensure the delivery of healthcare to the municipalities of Dili, Ermera, Liquiça, Manatuto and Aileu until the creation of the respective Municipal Hospitals."

These five municipalities – Timor-Leste's capital city and its four neighbours – account for 46% of the country's population. The Dili Municipality catchment area alone has around 300,000 residents, and the hospital's total catchment population is approximately 500,000.

=== Management ===
As an autonomous institution, HNGV is accountable directly to the Minister of Health, and is funded directly by the Ministry of Finance. Its management team is led by a hospital director and a clinical director; a quality focal person is in post, but no ward or service level managers.

The hospital also has no formal system for patient, family or community engagement in its management.

A significant and challenging management problem for the hospital is the number of languages used by its healthcare professionals, who may include specialist doctors from Cuba, China, Australia, or the UNFPA, as well as local doctors (who may have been trained in Indonesia). On a daily basis, English (HNGV's working language), Spanish, Portuguese, Indonesian and Tetun are used in conversation and in the hospital's clinical notes.

=== Services ===
HNGV administers both inpatient health care and a wide range of outpatient health services; it also has emergency care facilities, specialised services and enhanced laboratory facilities. As of 2022, it had 260–340 inpatient beds. On occasions, such as when there is an outbreak of dengue fever, patients are forced to share beds.

Inpatient services at HNGV cover general medicine, general surgery, paediatrics, obstetrics and gynaecology, and emergency. The hospital also admits patients for elective procedures through outpatient clinics. As of 2014, the outpatient services provided were:

- Internal medicine
- Surgery
- Paediatrics
- Obstetrics and gynaecology
- Mother and child health
- Cardiac
- Dermatology
- Dental care
- Ear, nose and throat (ENT)
- Psychology
- Angiology
- Counselling for HIV/AIDS

Additionally, HNGV has comprehensive clinical support services: laboratory and blood transfusion, pharmacy, radiology, physiotherapy and acupuncture. The on site diagnostic laboratory includes haematology, biochemistry, and histopathology; the National Health Laboratory (Portuguese: Laboratório Nacional de Saúde (LNS)), which is located nearby, provides diagnostic microbiology services.

Also on the site of the hospital, but separately from the outpatient care buildings, is a major national facility for eye care; it provides daily outpatient treatment of cataracts, and also eye health outreach to the municipalities.

=== Referrals ===
As the national referral hospital, HNGV is one of East Timor's six referral hospitals, and the country's only tertiary referral hospital. According to Ministry of Health guidelines, patients cannot be transferred from a primary level health facility to a referral hospital, or from another referral hospital to HNGV, without a referral. Consequently, a patient must often visit multiple facilities before reaching HNGV.

Other significant barriers are also frequently presented to patients needing to be treated at HNGV. Chronic shortages in patient transport, caused by inadequate coverage and malfunctioning ambulance and 'multi-function vehicle' services, are the principal barrier. Patients from remote parts of the country, including pregnant women, accident victims and those suffering from the effects of a stroke, are commonly also faced with rugged mountainous terrain, with very poor standards of infrastructure. They are often forced to rely upon medical evacuation by air to help them travel to HNGV.

Not all of the tertiary care organised for East Timorese patients is carried out at HNGV; most such care is administered overseas, under a limited number of overseas referrals. According to Júlio Sarmento da Costa (also known by his nom de guerre Meta Mali), who was appointed Minister for the Affairs of National Liberation Combatants in May 2020 [translation]:

"Many seriously ill people including veterans have to be referred to overseas hospitals to have their health checked because in Timor Leste there is no international standard hospital including Guido Valadares National Hospital (HNGV)".

Meta Mali went on to observe that the government through the Ministry of Health is therefore forced to spend a lot of money to pay for aeroplanes, hospital fees and accommodation costs for the safety of its people.

=== Teaching ===
The RACS, in collaboration with the Ministry of Health, manages a project for the provision of clinical services and training of medical staff at HNGV. The project has been conducted since 2002 under the Australia Timor-Leste Program of Assistance for Secondary Services (ATLASS), and is funded by the Australian government. As of 2016, the project involved the provision of specialists in five areas – surgery, paediatrics, emergency medicine, anaesthesia, and obstetrics and gynaecology – to assist in particular with postgraduate training of Timorese doctors and midwives.

An equivalent project, known as the East Timor Fellowship, is conducted at HNGV by the Australian Society of Anaesthetists (ASA); it supports an ASA member to assist with the training of anaesthesia non-specialists.

Additionally, under a partnership between Royal Darwin Hospital (RDH), Australia, and HNGV, paediatricians from Australia teach paediatric trainees at HNGV, and paediatric trainees from Timor-Leste spend time as paediatric registrars at RDH. The partnership project is funded by an Australian Awards Fellowship grant, and has also been supported by MIGA Medical Insurance Australia.

HNGV's principal development partner, especially in relation to teaching, is an Australian provider of health care services, St John of God Health Care, which has a memorandum of understanding (MoU) with the government to develop strategies and programs for the improvement of health care practices and nursing standards at the hospital. Since 2010, St John of God Health Care has been delivering a Nursing and Midwifery Development Program at HNGV, in partnership with the Ministry of Health. The program's aim is to improve standards in nursing and midwifery care to achieve better quality healthcare in East Timor. As of 2023, the program was supported by Santos, an Australian oil and gas exploration and production company; previously, from 2013, the supporter was the Australian subsidiary of ConocoPhillips, an American corporation, on behalf of the joint-venture partners of the Bayu-Undan project, a petroleum extraction project in the Timor Sea.

Another teaching project operated by St John of God Health Care at HNGV is a Health Manager Program (HMP), for emerging and established nurse and other hospital leaders. First delivered as a pilot course in 2016, the HMP uses project-based learning to teach participants how to lead teams, and to undertake quality improvement processes across hospital units.

HNGV is also involved in the Maternal Child Health (MCH) program run by Alola Foundation, an NGO founded in 2001 by Kirsty Sword Gusmão, a now former First Lady of East Timor. As part of that program, Alola Foundation assigns Hospital Liaison Officers at four referral hospitals, including HNGV, to educate and assist new mothers in relation to breastfeeding, and undertake early intervention for premature and underweight babies.

== See also ==
- List of hospitals in Timor-Leste
