= Odete Maria Freitas Belo =

East Timorese physician and politician

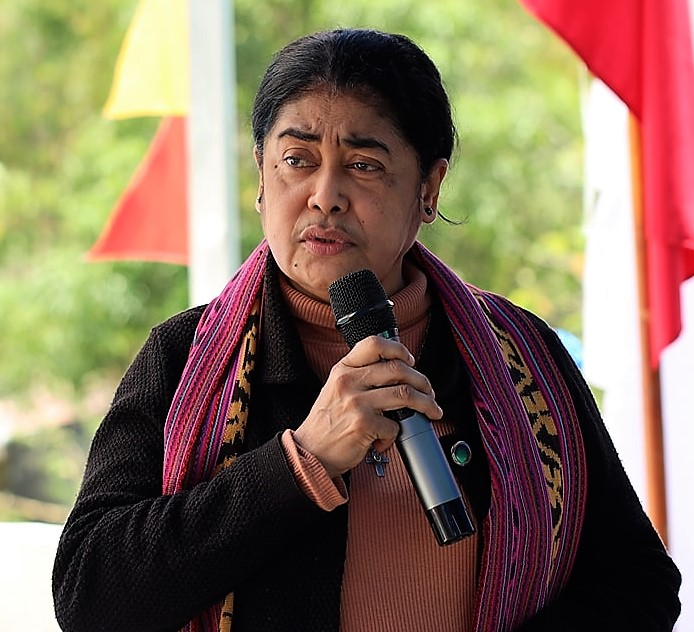
- Belo in 2022

Minister of Health
- In office 29 May 2020 – 1 July 2023
- Prime Minister: Taur Matan Ruak
- Preceded by: Rui Maria de Araújo
- Succeeded by: Élia António de Araújo dos Reis Amaral

Personal details
- Born: 21 February 1966 (age 60): Baucau, Portuguese Timor; (now East Timor)
- Party: Fretilin
- Education: Udayana University; Gadjah Mada University
- Profession: Physician

Odete Maria Freitas Belo (born 21 February 1966) is an East Timorese physician and politician, and a member of the Fretilin political party. From May 2020 to July 2023, she was the Minister of Health, serving in the VIII Constitutional Government of East Timor led by Prime Minister Taur Matan Ruak.

== Early life and education ==
Belo was born in Baucau, in the then Portuguese Timor (now East Timor). In 1996, she graduated from Udayana University, in Denpasar, Bali, Indonesia, with a degree in medicine, and in 2010, she completed a Master's degree in Public Health at Gadjah Mada University, Sleman Regency, Yogyakarta, Indonesia.

== Early and administrative career ==
Initially, Belo practised general medicine for more than five years in the Viqueque Municipality. She then spent 24 years as a health services manager and administrator.

Between 2010 and 2012, Belo was Deputy Director for Cooperation and Management of External Health Funds. From 2012, she was Chairman of the Temporary Management and Functioning Committee of the Autonomous Service of Medicines and Health Equipment E.P. (Portuguese: Serviço Autónomo de Medicamentos e Equipamentos de Saúde, SAMES E.P.). In 2015, she was appointed as chairman of the Liquidation Committee of the same public enterprise.

As of the onset of the COVID-19 pandemic in East Timor in early 2020, Belo was the general director of health care at the Ministry of Health. On 13 April 2020, she announced, in that capacity, that when the number of severely ill COVID-19 patients increased, the government would use the old 150-room Dr. António de Carvalho Hospital in Lahane as a medical facility for them.

At that time, the government was using a facility in Vera Cruz as an isolation centre for moderate COVID-19 patients; Belo also announced that if that facility became full, then an isolation centre in Tasi-tolu would be used for mild patients.

== Ministerial career ==
On 29 May 2020, following a change in the governing coalition, and the admission of Fretilin to the VIII Constitutional Government, Belo was sworn in as Minister of Health.

Upon taking up that appointment, Belo formally replaced Rui Maria de Araújo, who had resigned in 2018; two Deputy Ministers of Health, Élia António de Araújo dos Reis Amaral and Bonifácio dos Reis, respectively, had acted as Minister in the meantime, as President Francisco Guterres had declined to swear-in CNRT leader Xanana Gusmão's preferred candidate for the post.

On 1 June 2020, Prime Minister Taur Matan Ruak was reported as having said that he was optimistic that the eight new members of the government who had been sworn in the previous week, including Belo, would "strengthen" the government. The following week, on 9 June 2020, Belo attended a meeting of ministers to coordinate the implementation of the restructured government's projects and programs, at which the rehabilitation of the Lahane hospital was one of the projects analysed.

Soon afterwards, Belo and the Minister of the Presidency of the Council of Ministers, Fidelis Manuel Leite Magalhães, held two further coordinating meetings, with UNICEF and to coordinate proposals for amendments to the law, respectively, in each case in relation to the COVID-19 pandemic. Belo also met with the Deputy Minister of the Interior, António Armindo, to discuss a proposed contingency plan of procedures and sanitary measures to protect public health upon reinstatement of normal functioning of the national borders.

On 18 January 2021, the government, represented by Belo, entered into a partnership with the European Union (EU) and the World Health Organization (WHO) to "mitigate the impacts of communicable diseases, particularly COVID-19" and to make East Timor's health system stronger, more effective and more resilient. In March 2021, the UN resident representative in East Timor, Roy Trivedy, praised Belo and the Director General of the Ministry, Odete Viegas, for being "fundamental in leading the health response in the pandemic". On 16 June 2021, Belo, the EU and the WHO entered into a memorandum of understanding aimed at strengthening the government's response to COVID-19 in five regional municipalities.

Meanwhile, on 3 May 2022, Belo attended a meeting with the Ambassador of the United States of America to East Timor, Kevin Blackstone, at which the cooperation between the government and the United States in relation to the COVID-19 pandemic was discussed. In particular, the parties shared information about the construction by the United States of new isolation centres at Suai and Baucau. On 24 June 2022, Belo played a prominent role during a ceremony marking the arrival in East Timor of a mobile intensive care unit (ICU) donated by the American people as part of US$20 million provided to support East Timor's health security. She said that the ICU would be located at the Guido Valadares National Hospital (HNGV) in Dili, and that its first unit would be a 9-bed supplement to the 25 ICU beds with which the hospital was already equipped.

On 5 October 2022, the Council of Ministers approved a proposal by Belo for the construction of a five-storey Paediatric and Coronary Intensive Care Unit at the HNGV. It was expected that the unit would improve specialised quality care for emergency and urgent paedriatic cases, and also the national response to emerging and sporadic outbreaks of diseases with major public health impacts, including dengue fever and cholera.

The Prime Minister ceremonially laid the foundation stone for the new building on 26 January 2023. At the ceremony, Belo said that the facility would take two years to construct, and, when completed, would accommodate 327 beds, 81 midwives, and 163 nurses.

Two weeks earlier, on 12 January 2023, Belo launched the National Integrated Routine Immunization Campaign, to be held in all municipalities, and target children under five years of age.

Belo's tenure as Minister ended when the IX Constitutional Government took office on 1 July 2023. She was succeeded by Élia António de Araújo dos Reis Amaral.
