= National emblem of Timor-Leste =

- Armiger: Democratic Republic of Timor-Leste
- Adopted: 2007
- Motto: Unidade, Acção, Progresso (Note: Timor-Leste has not formally adopted the Portuguese-Language Orthographic Agreement of 1990, using the spelling Acção instead of Ação as specified in the agreement.) "Unity, Action, Progress"

The national emblem of Timor-Leste, also known as the Belak (Tetum for "Disk"), is one of the national symbols of the country.

== Current emblem ==
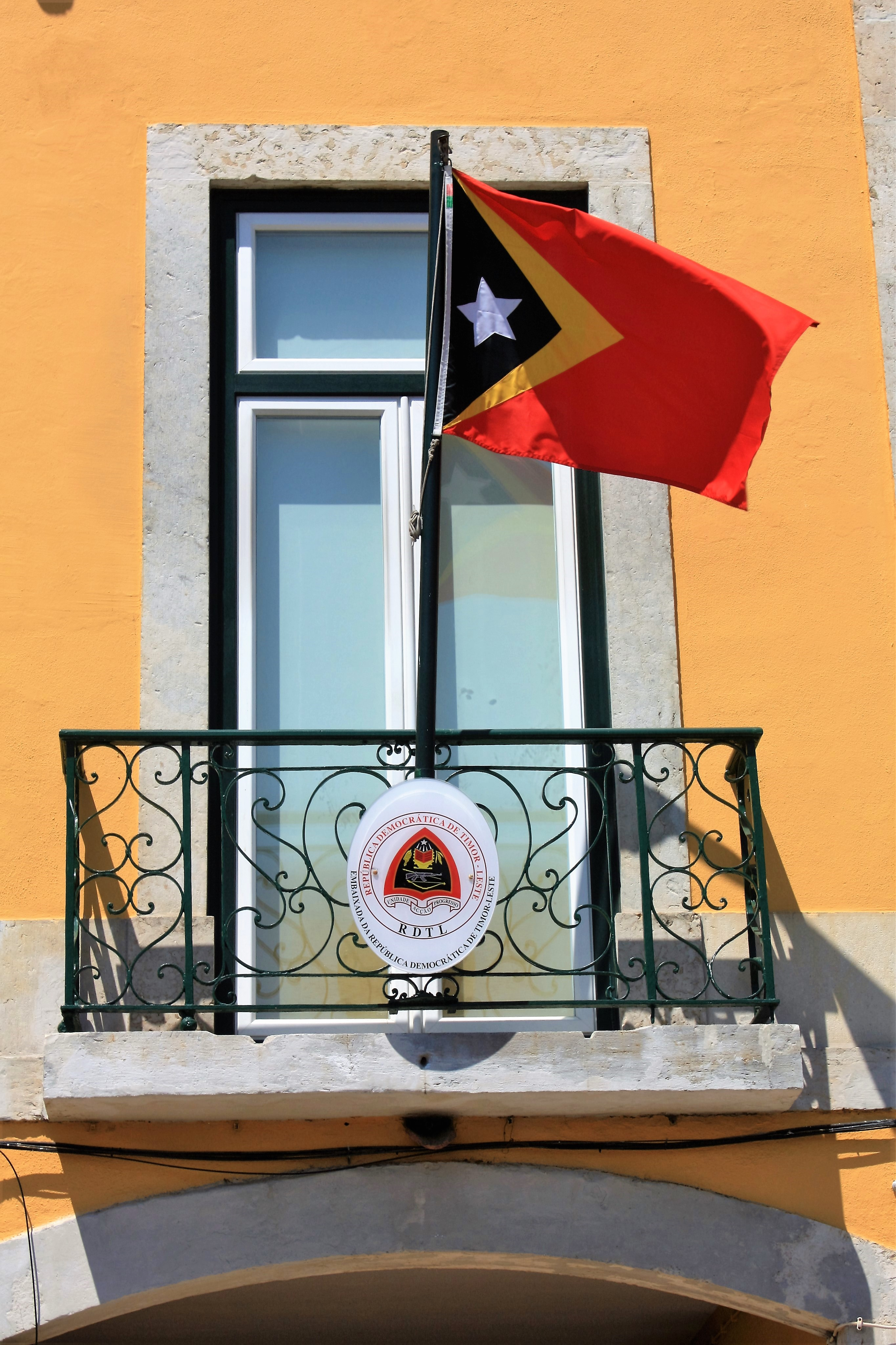
The coat of arms and flag of Timor-Leste on its embassy in Lisbon

The emblem was introduced on 18 January 2007 by Law 2/2007, replacing the coat of arms based on the shield of the National Council of Timorese Resistance (CNRT), which had been used since independence in 2002. The current coat of arms is a variant of the emblem used by East Timorese representatives during Indonesian occupation. It is based on a design first used when the country unilaterally declared independence on 28 November 1975.

=== Design ===
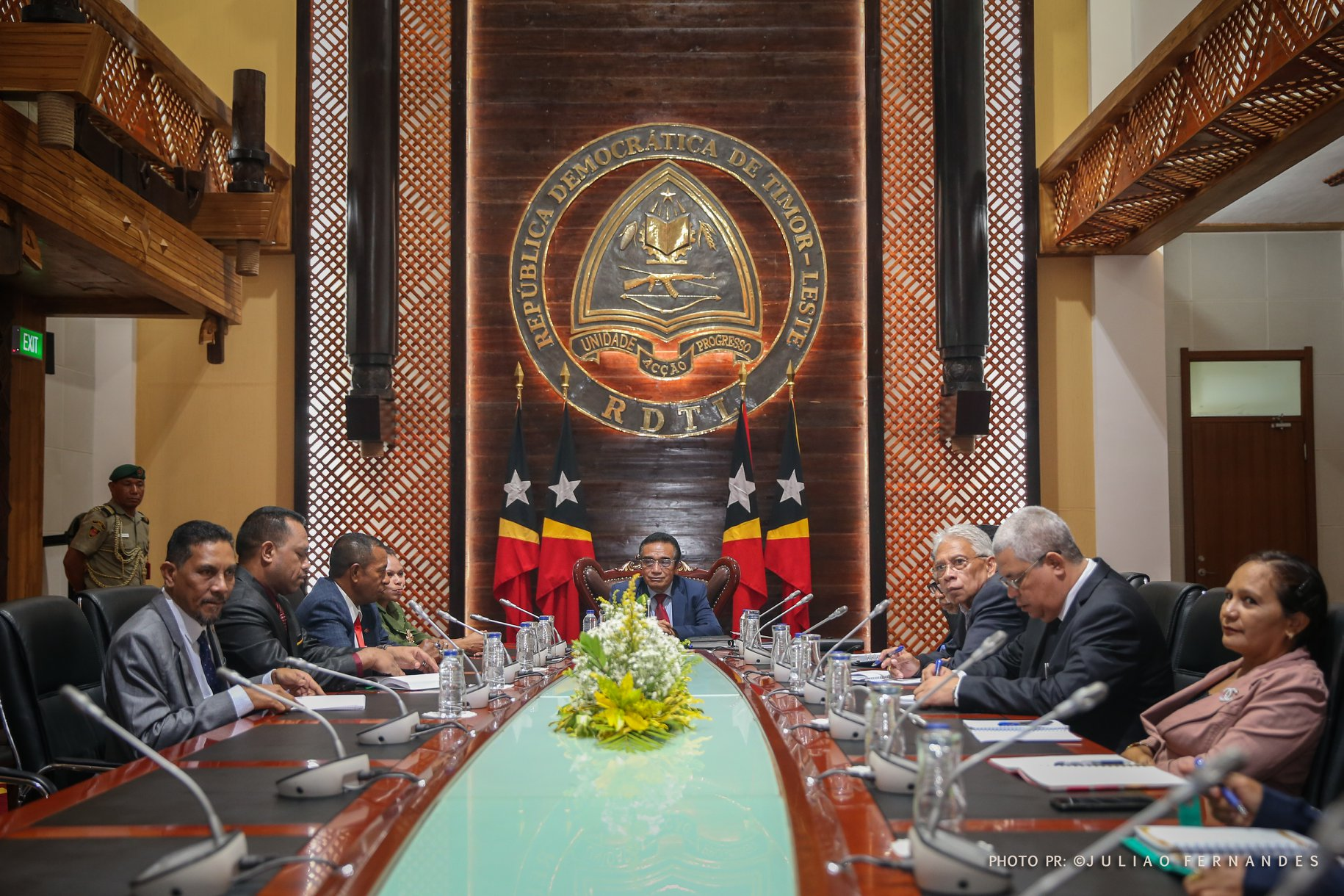
The national coat of arms in the Nicolau Lobato Presidential Palace (2020)

The center of the coat of arms shows the outline of the highest mountain in Timor-Leste, the Tatamailau (Foho Ramelau), on a white background in the national colors "ruby red" on the outside, black on the inside with a thin golden-yellow border. It is shaped like a square pyramid with three corners pointing down and one pointing up. The edges are arched.

In the center of the top corner of the mountain is a five-pointed white star. One of the points of the star, without touching it, points to the top corner of the mountain. Out of the star come five white, pyramidal rays, ending at the top of an open book located in the upper part of the black part of the mountain.

The book has a ruby red cover, the edges are golden yellow. There are four black lines on the right side of the book and five on the left. There is a golden yellow band at the bottom of the pages. The book is in front of a golden yellow cog wheel standing on a golden yellow pedestal. To the right of the gear wheel and book is an ear of rice with two leaves and eleven grains, to the left is a corncob, also with two leaves. Both are golden yellow and turned tip down.

Below the gear and book is a white-rimmed Kalashnikov with butt to the left and barrel to the right. The barrel is slightly higher than the butt, but does not touch the gear. A golden-yellow, Timorese spear (diman) lies behind the weapon, the tip of which points to the left.

Below the rifle, in the middle of the black part of the mountain, is a yellow-gold, Timorese bow (Rama-inan), the string of which points upwards.

Below the outline of the mountain is a wavy, "light red" framed, white banner on which the new national motto is written in ruby red in Portuguese: "Unidade, Acção, Progresso". This band runs in waves parallel to the edge of the mountain outline.

The mountain and banner are surrounded by two thin dark red rings. Between the circles is the official country name in Portuguese, República Democrática de Timor-Leste, on a white background with ruby red writing in the upper part . The inscription runs on the ring from the level of the lower left corner of Mount Tatamailau to the level of the lower right corner. In the lower part of the ring is the abbreviation of the country name RDTL.

=== Meaning ===
The coat of arms symbolizes the globe with the country of Timor-Leste and at the same time stands for national unity. The white background color within the ring, star and rays symbolizes peace. The yellow in the coat of arms signifies wealth, black symbolizes the eclipse that must be conquered, and red represents love of homeland and the struggle for national liberation.

The five points of the star symbolize the light of generosity and honesty leading the people to peace. Its rays represent the light of solidarity and the will to bring peace to the whole world.

The four corners of the outline of Mount Tatamailau represent the principle of the separation of powers (president, parliament, government, and judiciary) and the independence of state organs.

The open book, cogwheel, ear of rice and corncob symbolize wisdom and the people's ability to advance in the fields of education, culture, social justice, agriculture and industry.

The rifle, spear and bow represent the values of the people's centuries-long struggle for national liberation and self-defense for the honor and dignity of Timor-Leste's sovereignty. The rifle may be a homage to the emblem of Mozambique. The FALINTIL East Timor did not use a Kalashnikov in the liberation struggle.

The motto in Portuguese, "Unidade, Acção, Progresso" ("Unity, Action, Progress"), states the basic values of politics and ethics that govern the life of the nation and the people.

== Previous emblems ==
=== Portuguese colonial era (1935–1975) ===
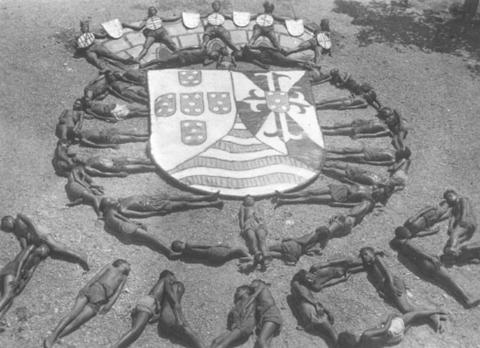
Timorese form the coat of arms of the colony with their bodies, Álbum Fontoura (1930)

In 1935, the Portuguese colonies were officially assigned coats of arms that followed a standard design pattern. (Note: published in the Diário do Govêrno) The three-part shield shows in the first field on silver five blue shields, each with five silver coins (quinas) forming a cross; the central element from the coat of arms of Portugal. The arms of Portuguese Timor followed the same format of other Portuguese colonies (later overseas provinces) with the territory being represented by the black and white Dominican cross in recognition of the role played by the Dominican Order in converting the East Timorese to Roman Catholicism. The field was silver/black eightfold confessed with a silver/black fleur-de-lys cross, additionally there was a quina in the centre of the cross. In the third field there are green waves on silver.

Coat of Arms of Portugal in Portuguese Timor (1520–1975)

Proposal for coat of arms of Portuguese Timor (1932)

Coat of arms of Portuguese Timor (8 May 1935 – 11 June 1951)

Coat of arms of Portuguese Timor (11 June 1951 – 28 November 1975)

Lesser coat of arms of Portuguese Timor (1935–1975)

=== Japanese occupation (1942–1945) ===
The imperial chrysanthemum crest was used in the territory during the Japanese occupation of Timor.

Chrysanthemum crest

=== Unilateral declaration of independence (1975) ===
After East Timor unilaterally declared independence on 28 November 1975, the Democratic Republic of East Timor used a national emblem similar to the current emblem that was adopted in 2007.

Emblem of the Democratic Republic of East Timor (1975–1976)

=== Indonesian occupation (1975–1999) ===
Indonesia invaded East Timor on 7 December 1975, established a provisional government, and annexed it the following year under the name Timor Timur as Indonesia's 27th province.

The province of Timor Timur had its own emblem, which remained in use until Indonesia rescinded its annexation in 1999. The emblem, in the Indonesian heraldic style, consisted of a golden shield containing wreaths of wheat and cotton enclosing a blue roundel containing a stylised traditional Timorese holy house (uma lulik). This was surmounted by a blue shield depicting a gold star representing the faith in one God. Below the blue shield followed a red banner with the motto "Houri Otas, Houri Wain, Oan Timor Asswa'in" in Tetum translated as "From the ages past, from today, we are Timorese warriors". Below the roundel appeared a golden traditional Timorese headdress (Kaibauk) bearing the inscription "Timor Timur".

Coat of arms of Indonesia (1976–1999)

Emblem of Timor Timur Province during Indonesian occupation (1976–1999)

=== United Nations Administered East Timor (1999–2002) ===
Following the end of the Indonesian occupation, East Timor was administered by the United Nations between October 1999 and May 2002. The United Nations Transitional Administration in East Timor used the emblem of the United Nations with the legend UNTAET below for official purposes. Following elections held August 2001, the newly established transitional government used a seal depicting an outline of the island of Timor, a crocodile, traditional head-dress and tais patterns. The seal included the words and Governo and Timor Leste in Portuguese or Timor Lorosa’e and Governu in Tetum.

Emblem of United Nations (1999–2002)

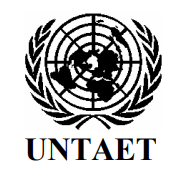
Emblem of the United Nations Transitional Administration in East Timor (UNTAET) (1999–2002)

Emblem of United Nations Administered East Timor (2001–2002)

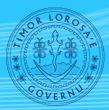
Emblem of United Nations Administered East Timor in Tetum (2001–2002)

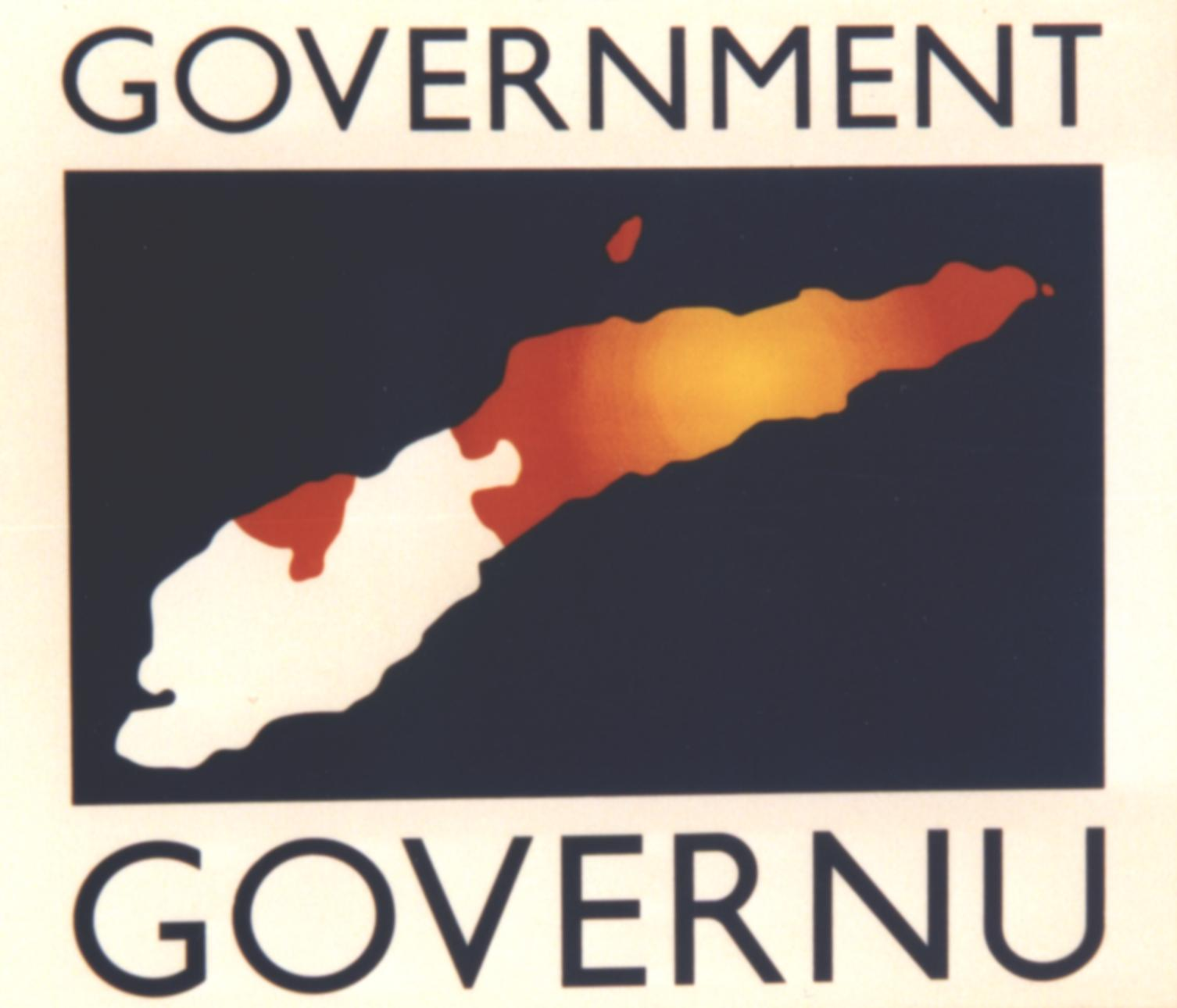
Government logo on a vehicle under UN Administration in 2002

=== First post-independence emblem (2002–2007) ===
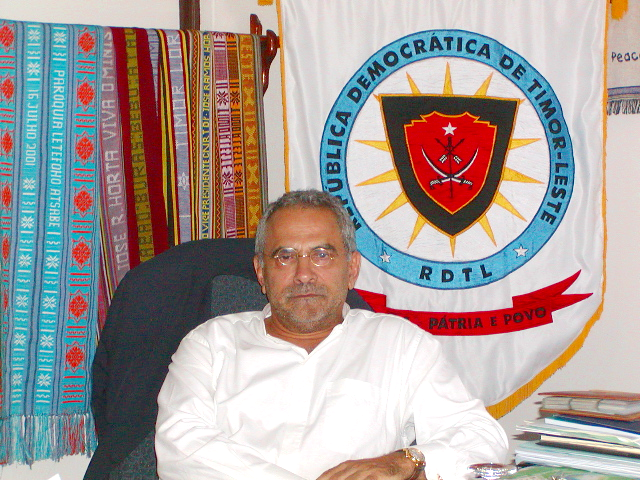
Prime minister José Ramos-Horta in front of the first emblem displayed on a Gonfalon

The first emblem of post-independence Timor-Leste contained the shield of the Conselho Nacional de Resistência Timorense (National Council of Timorese Resistance). The shield originated from the military arm of the Timorese resistance group, Falintil, in 1987. The main elements were two crossed Suriks (traditional Timorese swords), together with a spear, a star, and two arrows. The inner red shield takes the form of a quay buoy on the upper side. The country's title, in Portuguese, is on a blue ring around the shield and a sun with 14 rays. The motto in the banner translated as: "Honour, Homeland, and People".

Coat of arms of the FALINTIL and the CNRT

First emblem of independent Timor-Leste (2002–2007)

== Subnational emblems ==
Some of the Municipalities of Timor-Leste have adopted their own emblems.

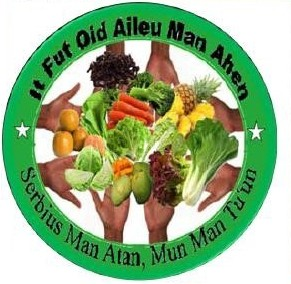
Aileu

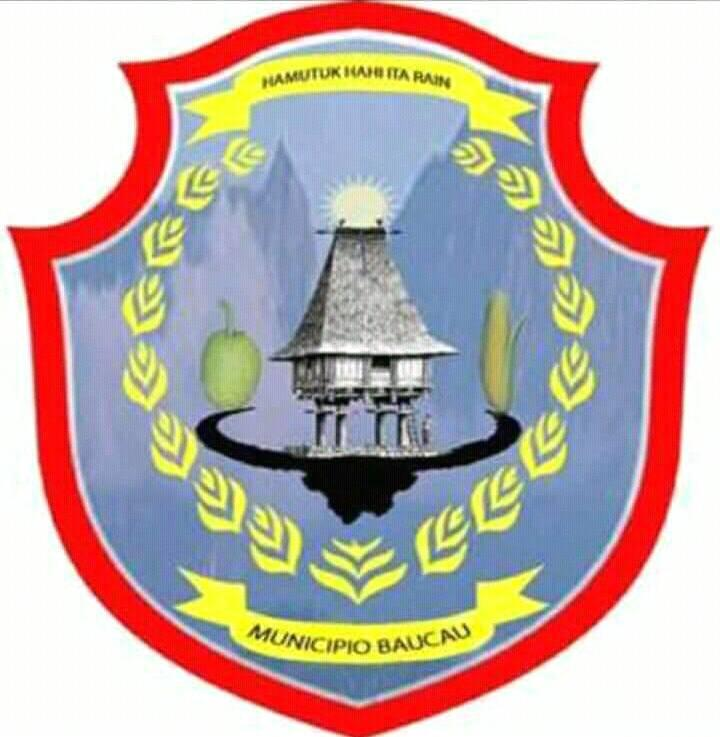
Baucau

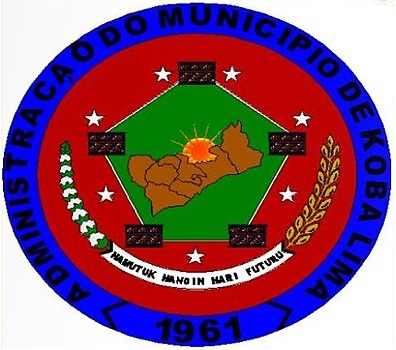
Cova Lima (former)

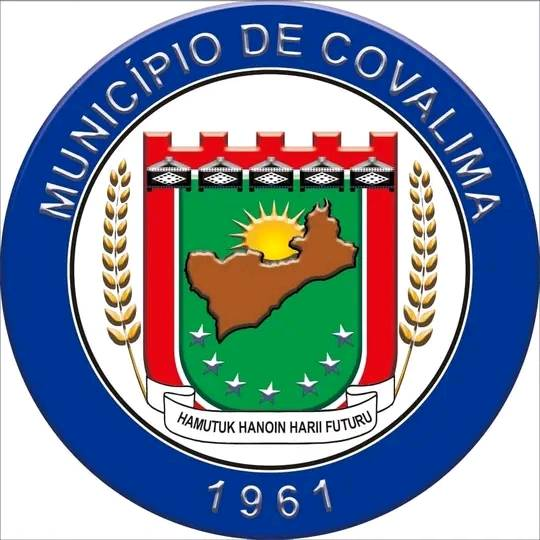
Cova Lima (current)

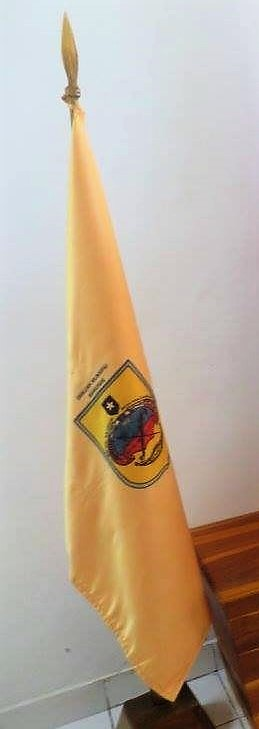
Manufahis

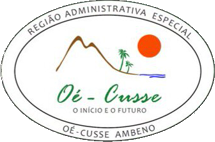
Oecusse

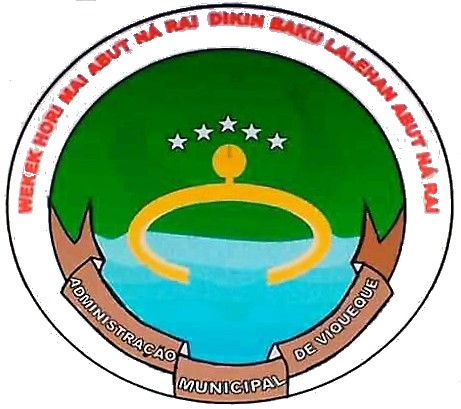
Viqueque

== See also ==
- Flag of Timor-Leste

== Sources ==
- Law 02/2007, National symbols of Timor-Leste
