= MOPH =

MOPH may refer to:

- Military Order of the Purple Heart, an American military organization
- Ministry of Public Health, a government agency name used in several countries; see List of health departments and ministries
