= Maria do Céu Sarmento =

Maria do Céu Sarmento Pina da Costa
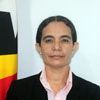

Minister of Health
- In office 16 February 2015 – 14 September 2017
- Preceded by: Sérgio Lobo
- Succeeded by: Rui Maria de Araújo

Vice Minister of Health for Management, Assistance and Resources
- In office 8 August 2012 – 15 February 2015
- Preceded by: Madalena Hanjam
- Succeeded by: Ana Isabel Soares

Deputy Dean of Academic Affairs, Faculty of Medicine and Medical Science, National University of East Timor
- Incumbent
- Assumed office 2011

Personal details
- Born: 14 April 1968 (age 58) Dili, Portuguese Timor
- Party: CNRT
- Profession: Doctor, academic

Maria do Céu Sarmento Pina da Costa (born 14 April 1968 in Dili, Portuguese Timor) is an East Timorese doctor, academic and politician. From 2015 to 2017, she was Minister of Health. Sarmento is a member of the National Congress for Timorese Reconstruction (Congresso Nacional da Reconstrução Timorense) (CNRT).

== Early life and education ==
From 1976 to 1982, Sarmento attended primary school, then junior high school for two years, and from 1986 to 1988 secondary school. Sarmento studied from 1989 at the Faculty of Medicine of Udayana University in Bali, Indonesia, and graduated in 1996.

== Medical career ==
From 1996 to 2001, Sarmento worked as an assistant physician in the Medical Department of the National Hospital in Dili, which from 1999 was under the direction of the International Red Cross. From 2001 to 2006, she was a general assistant physician in the same hospital. Then she attended a course at the National School of Public Health in Havana, Cuba, from February to June 2009. From 2009 to 2011, she was the Coordinator for Bilateral Affairs with Cuba, as well as a Technical Assistant at the Ministry of Health of East Timor. Since 2011, Sarmento has been Deputy Dean of Academic Affairs and lecturer at the Faculty of Medicine and Medical Science of the National University of East Timor in Dili.

Sarmento was a treasurer at the East Timor Medical Association from 2000 to 2005, president in 2005, and a consultant since 2006.

== Political career ==
In 2012, she was sworn in as Vice Minister of Health for Management, Assistance and Resources in the V Constitutional Government of East Timor. After the government reshuffle of 2015, she was appointed Minister of Health in the VI Constitutional Government of East Timor, being sworn in on 16 February. In 2017, Rui Maria de Araújo replaced Sarmento as Minister of Health in the new government.

== Personal life ==
Sarmento is married. She is fluent in Tetum, Malay, Portuguese and Spanish. She also speaks English.

== Awards ==
- 2002 – Woman of the year in the field of health of Queen Entertainment Timor, Dili
- July 2003 to June 2004 – Best doctor of National Hospital Guido Valadares
