= Guido Valadares =

Temorese politician and activist

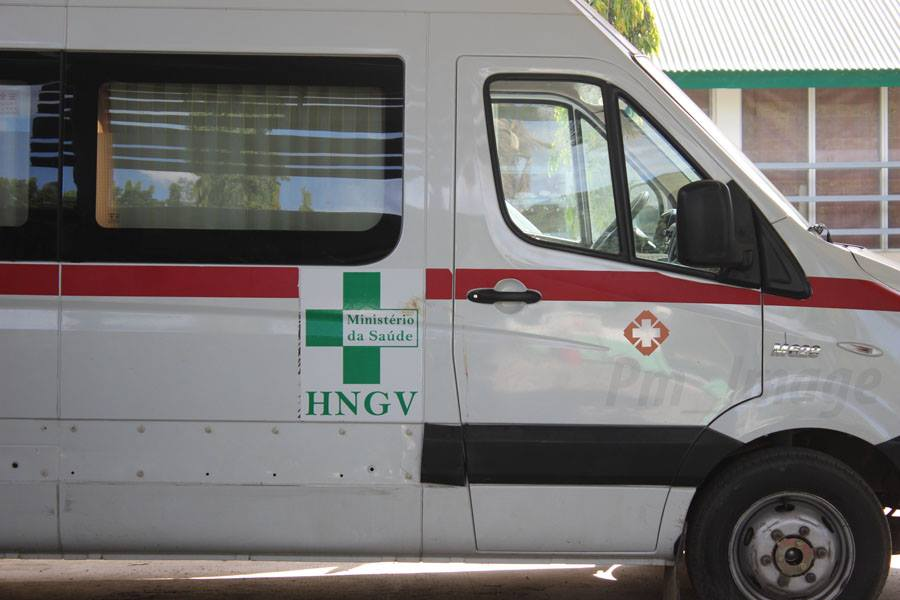
- Ambulance of the National Hospital Guido Valadares (HNGV)

Vice-Minister of Labor and Social Welfare of the FRETILIN government
- In office 1975–1975

Guido Valadares (born 12 June 1934 – 30 August 1976) was a Timorese politician and independence activist. He was a member of FRETILIN National Committee and the vice-minister of labor and social welfare of the FRETILIN government in 1975". In 2003, the national hospital of East Timor was renamed in his honor, Guido Valadares National Hospital.
