= Palácio das Cinzas =

Government building in Dili, Timor-Leste

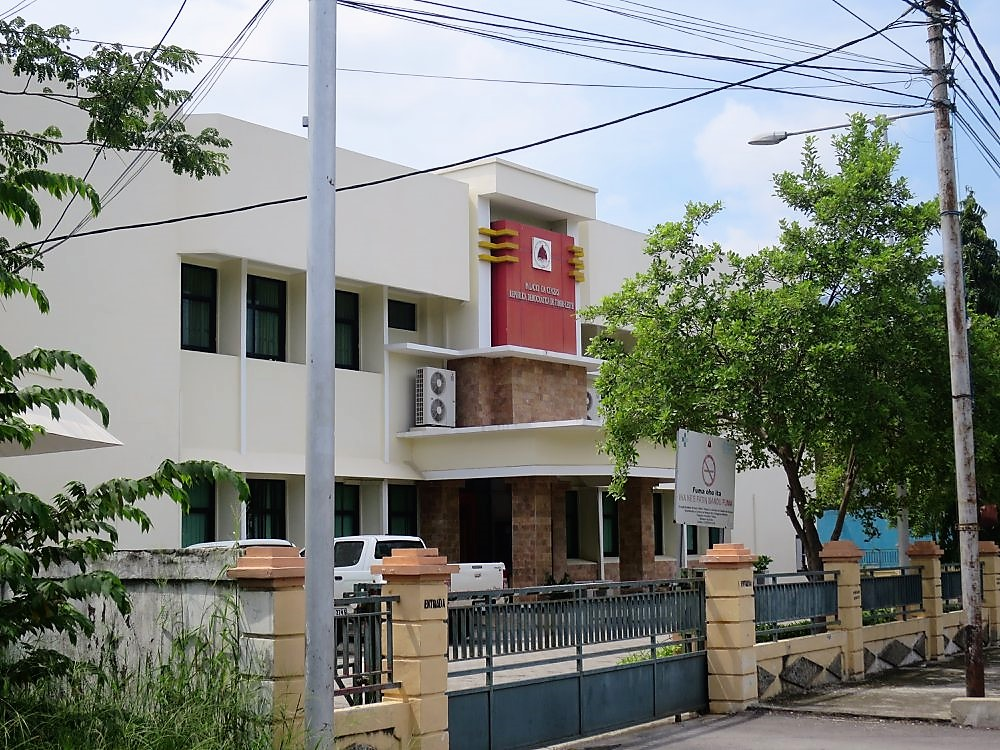
- The building in 2018
- Interactive map of the Palácio das Cinzas area

General information
- Type: Office
- Location: Rua Palácio das Cinzas, Caicoli, Dili, Timor-Leste
- Coordinates: 8°33′43″S 125°34′31″E
- Current tenants: Ministry of Health
- Renovated: 2002
- Owner: Government of Timor-Leste

Website
- Ministry of Health

The Palácio das Cinzas (transl. Palace of Ashes, or Palace of the Ashes) (Note: The expression Palácio das Cinzas is usually not translated in English language sources) is the former official workplace of the President of Timor-Leste. It served in that role from 2002 to 2009. As of 2022, it was the headquarters of the East Timorese Ministry of Health.

== History ==
During the Indonesian occupation of East Timor, the building was a police station and vehicle registration facility. In 1999, in the wave of violence caused by pro-Indonesia militia groups and Indonesian troops, it was burned down. Only the walls remained.

When Timor-Leste resumed independence in May 2002, the new Constitutional Government under Prime Minister Mari Alkatiri took over the refurbished Government Palace on the Dili waterfront. Initially, the new President, Xanana Gusmão, to whom only a pittance was available to fund his presidential office, had to make do with some spare offices in the same building. He considered that he did not have enough space to operate effectively, and that he needed to be separate from the government.

Gusmão therefore set up a discrete presidential office in the still burned-out former police station and vehicle registration facility. He had the building fitted out with plywood screens, and called it the Palácio das Cinzas. However, he continued to live in his own home, as his young nation could not afford to provide him with an official residence. On 28 October 2002, Gusmão unveiled the Palácio das Cinzas as his new official workplace. The unveiling ceremony began with a parade of cutlass-bearing tribesmen and a flag-raising carried out by three goosestepping youths. The President then cut a ribbon, and Dili's Vicar-General, Father Jose Antonio da Cunha, sprinkled holy water.

During the unveiling ceremony, Gusmão told his audience of diplomatic corps and UN officials that he had chosen the building because independence had emerged from the ashes of destruction and he wished to set an example, "to curb public expenditure... otherwise we won't achieve much in this independence process". In naming the building, the President had also been influenced by the Portuguese propensity for describing presidential offices as "palaces", and a Time magazine cover article that had heralded East Timor's rise from the ashes.

As a gesture of solidarity with Timor-Leste's impoverished people, Gusmão intentionally left the building in disrepair. It had no proper roof and only makeshift windows. However, the President did not also intend that his unconventional office arrangements would be permanent. By 2003, plans had already been drawn up for a more comfortable palace, and the Chinese government had offered to help fund its construction.

Meanwhile, the Palácio das Cinzas served its purpose, including by hosting important meetings. For example in November 2003 Gusmão held talks in the building with senior Portuguese minister Nuno Morais Sarmento, who was visiting Dili to reaffirm Lisbon's commitment to continue aiding Timor-Leste after the then scheduled end of the United Nations Mission of Support to East Timor in May 2004. Similarly, in the early stages of the 2006 East Timorese crisis Gusmão and Alkatiri met with journalists at the building, and made a number of important announcements.

Two months later, however, The New York Times described the Palácio das Cinzas as "a glorified bungalow really". In 2008, even more critical observations were made by a Portuguese journalist reporting on an interview at the building with José Ramos-Horta, Gusmão's successor as President. He asserted that the palace "... took on the haunting and sinister air of the rest of the neighbourhood." The building looked empty, it appeared that no one worked there, and the President, the palace, and Timor-Leste as a whole seemed terribly weak.

In April 2009, construction of the replacement Nicolau Lobato Presidential Palace was completed. The new palace was inaugurated on 27 August 2009. Since then, Palácio das Cinzas has been renovated, and the Ministry of Health has set up its headquarters there. In 2015, the street in which the palace is located was renamed Rua Palácio das Cinzas.
