= Sérgio Lobo =

East Timorese politician (born 1958)

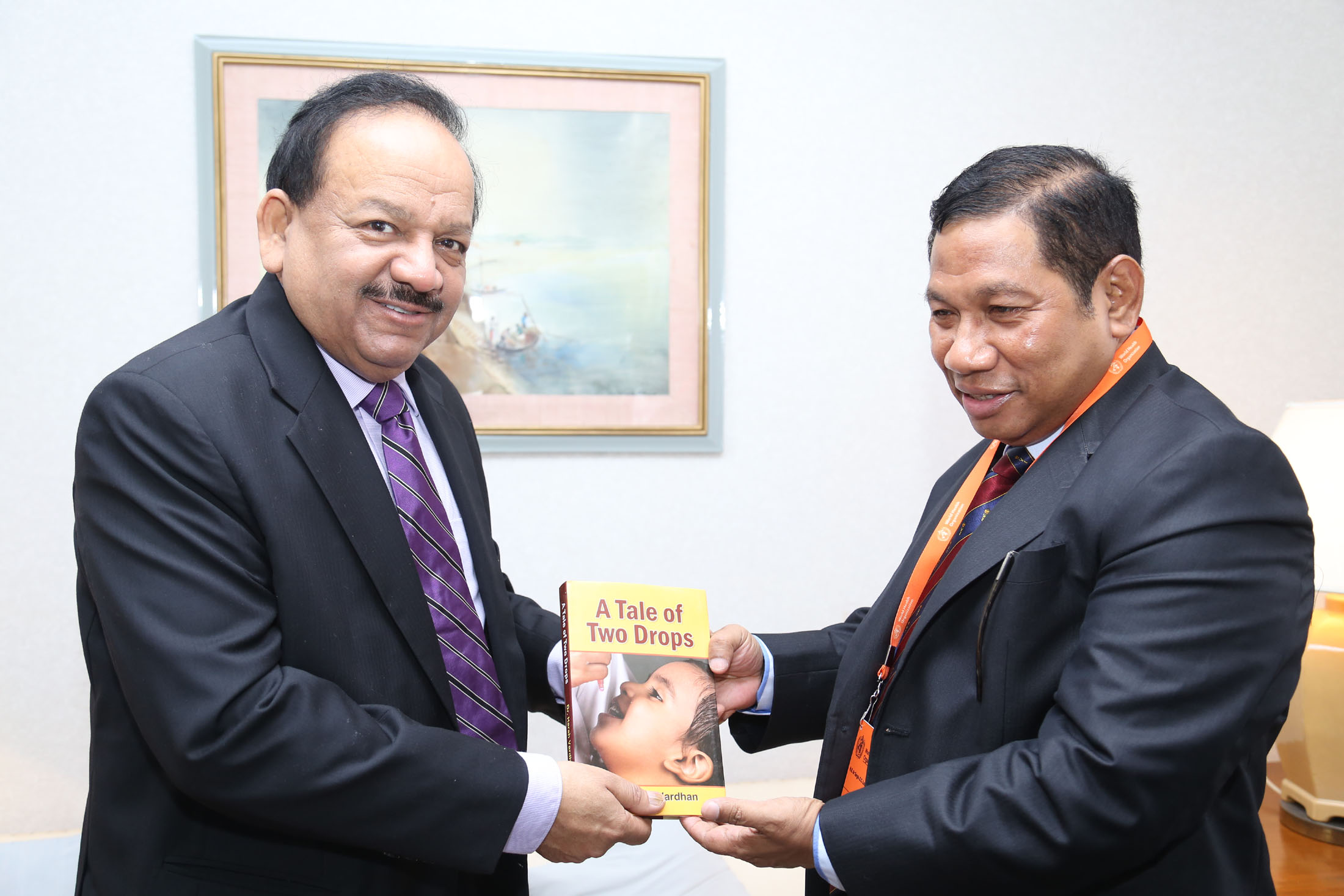
- Harsh Vardhan and Lobo in 2019

3rd Minister of Health
- In office 8 August 2012 – 16 February 2015
- President: Taur Matan Ruak
- Prime Minister: Xanana Gusmão
- Preceded by: Nélson Martins
- Succeeded by: Maria do Céu Sarmento

Personal details
- Born: Sérgio Gama da Costa Lobo; 19 July 1958 (age 68) Hatu-Builico, Portuguese Timor
- Party: National Congress for Timorese Reconstruction
- Occupation: Politician

Sérgio Gama da Costa Lobo (born 19 July 1958) is a politician from East Timor who served as the Minister of Health from 2012 to 2015. He has served as the Catholic Scouts of Dili's leader since 1978 and an international commissioner since 1980. He served on the Diocese of Dili's Pastoral Commission from 1978 to 1980. He has provided guidance to the East Timor Medical Association since 2005. Additionally from 2010 to 2014, Lobo was a member of the National Executive Council of the Cruz Vermelha de Timor-Leste (CVTL), the East Timorese Red Cross.

== Early life and education ==
In 1997, Lobo earned a degree in general surgery from Indonesia's Diponegoro University in Semarang. He finished courses in health finance at the World Bank Institute in Washington, D.C., and Pacific Senior Public Management at the Asian Development Bank Institute in Brisbane, Australia and Suva, Fiji, both in 2000. Between 2009 and 2011, Lobo studied hypnotherapy online at the American Hypnosis Motivation Institute, and in 2011, he attended the Path Light Center in Singapore.

== Political career ==
Lobo oversaw health at the Conselho Nacional de Resistência Timorense (CNRT) from 1999 to 2000. He also established the Working Group of East Timorese Health Professionals in 1999, serving as its chairman from 1999 to 2000. Lobo led the Ministry of Social Affairs' health services division during the United Nations (UN).

Lobo was taken into custody on 10 July 2001, after he allegedly hit his wife. On the same charges, he had previously been detained in February. In accordance with the accusations, over the course of their 15-year marriage, Lobo allegedly used violence on numerous occasions. At the trial, Lobo argued that the East Timorese culture gave him the right to know where his wife was and to have control over her. Lobo was placed under house arrest and granted a conditional parole from Becora prison on 25 July. He continued to be in charge of the couple's four kids. Reports on the case were used by a number of human rights and women's rights organizations to condemn the pervasive domestic violence in East Timor. A women's shelter was able to accommodate Lobo's wife. Her husband resisted filing for divorce. 2008 saw Lobo's assault and property damage trial, but he was found not guilty. In 2009, the matter was concluded.

For the 2018 East Timorese parliamentary election, Lobo was supposed to become Minister of Health again under Prime Minister Taur Matan Ruak, but President Francisco Guterres refused to appoint him, as well as other nominated members of the government, citing ethical reasons. In the case of Lobo, Guterres referred to the behavior towards his wife.

Lobo has been assigned to the government's crisis team as the Working Group on Preventing and Mitigating the COVID-19 Outbreak's coordinator due to the threat of the COVID-19 pandemic in East Timor and the commission to advise and evaluate strategies for the prevention and control of the coronavirus pandemic (Tetum: Komisaun Akompañamentu no Avaliasaun Estratéjia ba Prevensaun no Kombate Pandemia Koronavírus, CAAEPC-COVID-19).

Political offices
Preceded by Nélson Martins	3rd Minister of Health; 8 August 2012 – 16 February 2015	Succeeded by Maria do Céu Sarmento
