= Nicolau Lobato Presidential Palace =

Official workplace of the President of Timor-Leste

- Palácio Presidencial Nicolau Lobato (Portuguese); Palásiu Prezidensiál Nicolau Lobato (Tetum)
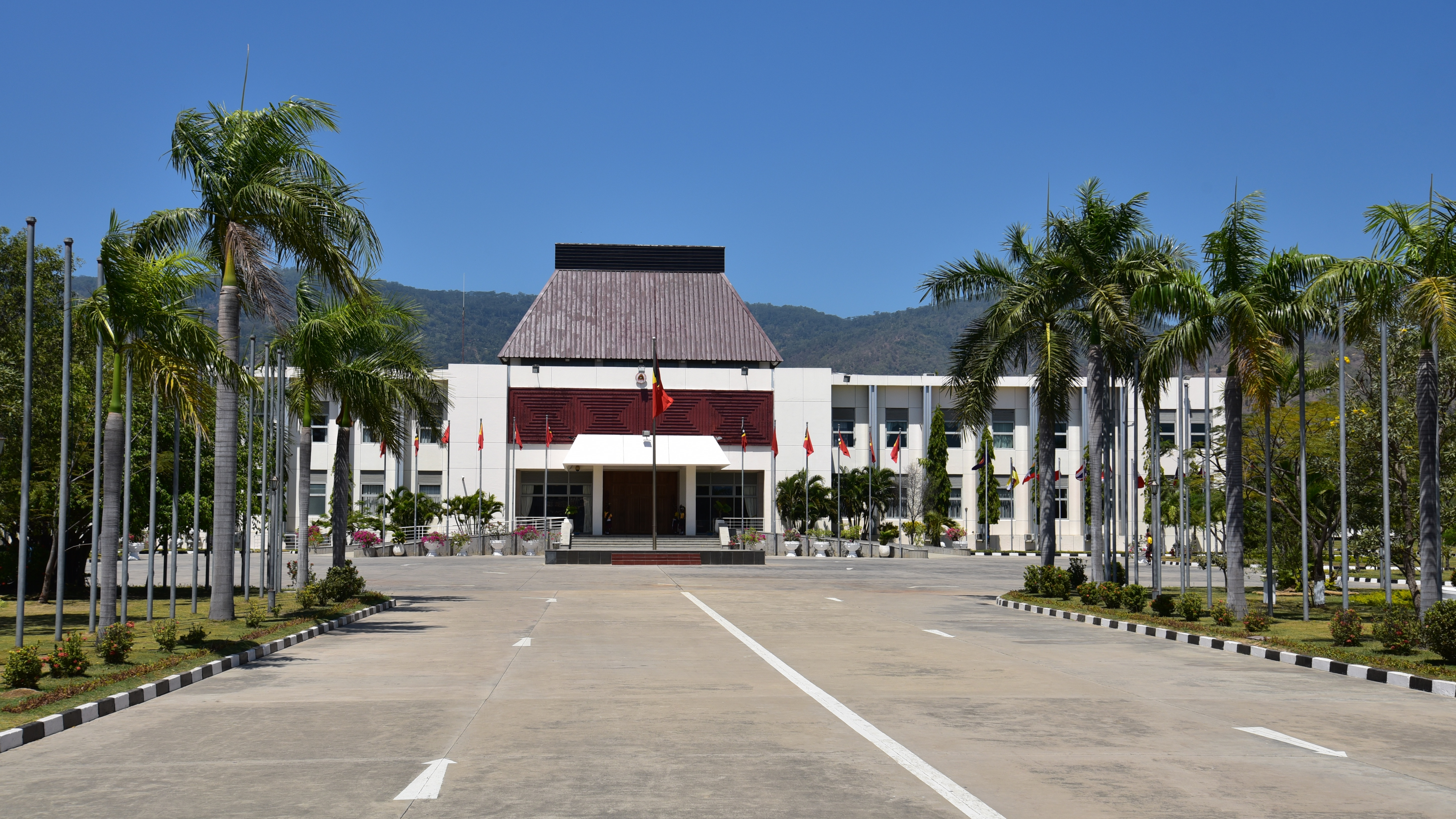
- The palace in 2023
- Interactive map of the Nicolau Lobato Presidential Palace area

General information
- Type: Presidential palace
- Architectural style: Modernist
- Location: Avenida Presidente Nicolau Lobato, Bairro Pite, Dili, Timor-Leste
- Coordinates: 8°33′19″S 125°33′47″E
- Current tenants: José Ramos-Horta
- Construction started: 2 July 2007
- Completed: April 2009
- Inaugurated: 27 August 2009
- Client: President of Timor-Leste
- Owner: Government of Timor-Leste

Website
- President of the Republic
- Logo
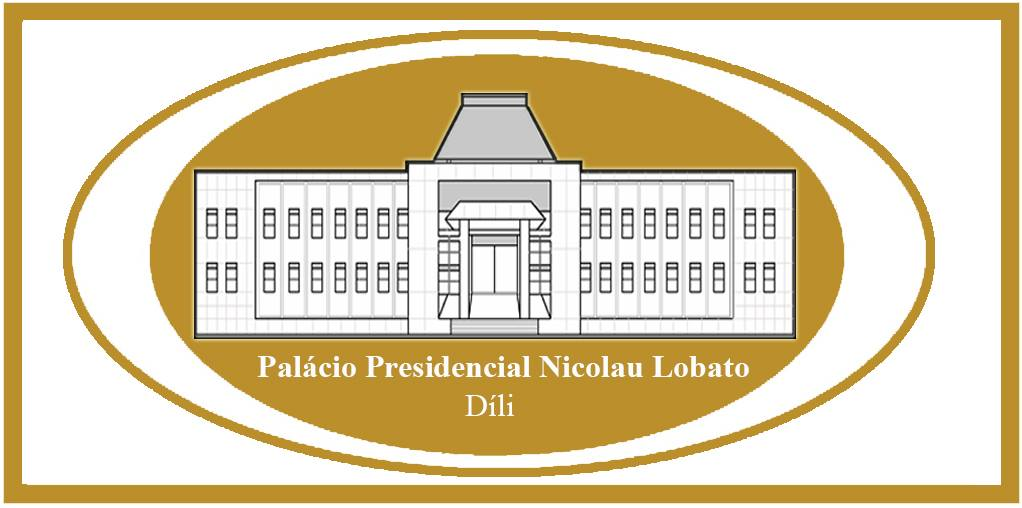

The Nicolau Lobato Presidential Palace (Portuguese: Palácio Presidencial Nicolau Lobato, Tetum: Palásiu Prezidensiál Nicolau Lobato) is the official workplace of the President of the Democratic Republic of Timor-Leste. It is located in Avenida Presidente Nicolau Lobato, Bairro Pite, a suco of Dili, the capital city of Timor-Leste, and has been the workplace of the President since 2009.

== History ==
When Timor-Leste resumed independence in May 2002, the new President, Xanana Gusmão, considered that he needed to have a presidential office discrete from the one occupied by the Constitutional Government, then headed by Prime Minister Mari Alkatiri. Gusmão therefore set up a separate presidential office in a burned-out building, which he named the Palácio das Cinzas (transl. Palace of Ashes).

However, the President did not also intend that this makeshift and unconventional office arrangement would be permanent. By 2003, plans had already been drawn up for a more comfortable palace, and the Chinese government had offered to help fund its construction.

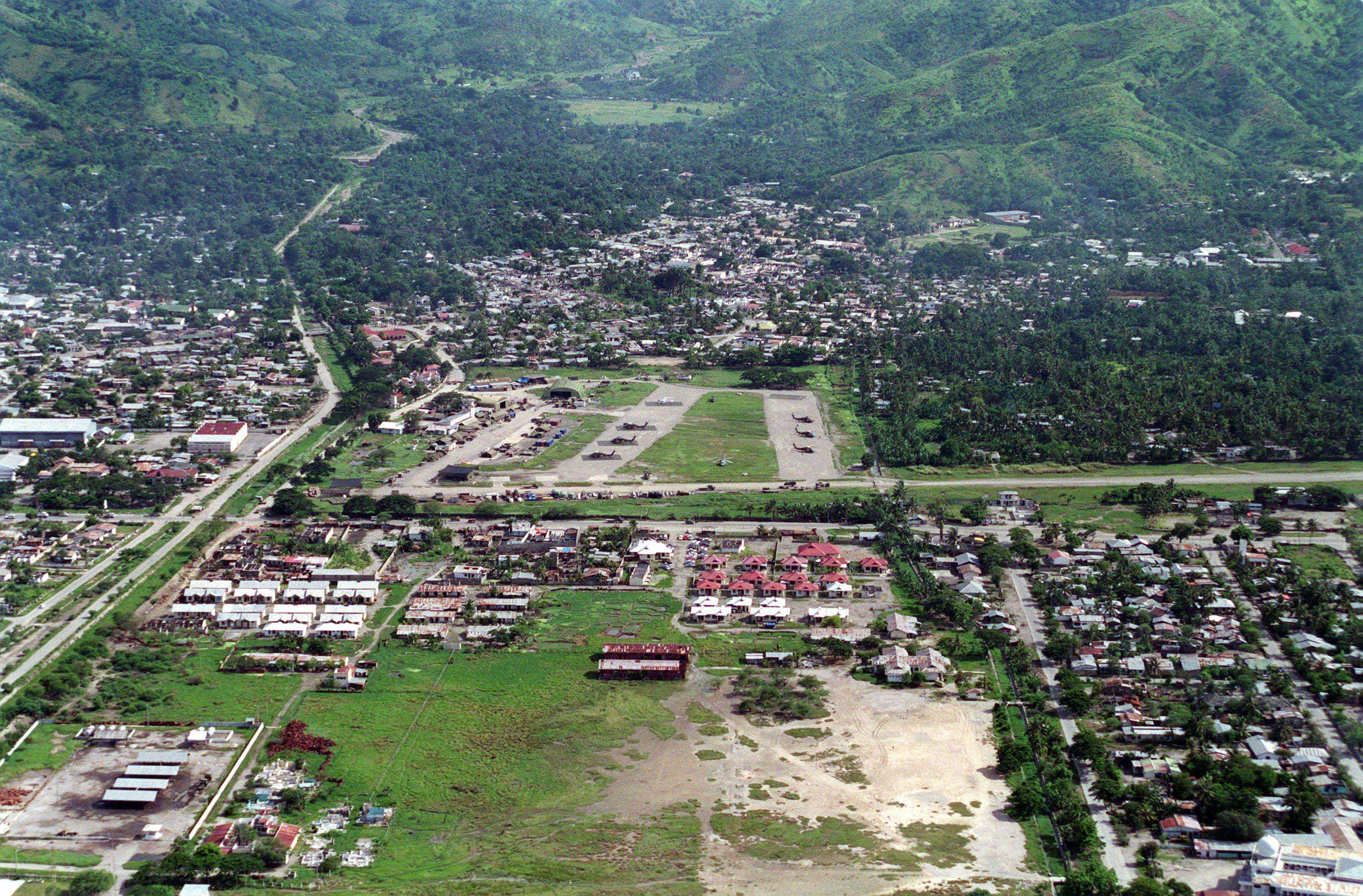
The present day Avenida Presidente Nicolau Lobato in February 2000, with Kampung Alor in the foreground. The presidential palace now stands in Bairro Pite on the site of the heliport

The foundation-laying ceremony for the new palace was held on 2 July 2007. At that time, its intended name was "Palace of Hope" (Portuguese: Palácio da Esperança); the then Chinese ambassador to Timor-Leste, Su Jian, said that the name marked the youngest country embracing challenges and marching towards a bright future.

During the twilight years of the Portuguese colonial era, the land where the palace now stands was the site of Dili's first airport, which was later transformed into a heliport. As of July 2007, the site was still being used as a helicopter base, by the Australian-led Operation Astute stabilisation force. Construction of the palace began that year, after the Australians moved out.

The palace was designed, built and furnished by the government of China, with almost no Timorese involvement. The building work was completed in April 2009. The construction cost, funded by Chinese aid, has been said to be US$6 million and US$7 million. The palace was inaugurated on 27 August 2009. Three days later, on 30 August 2009, the then President of Timor-Leste, José Ramos-Horta, announced that it had been named Nicolau Lobato Presidential Palace.

Since its inauguration, the palace and the grounds surrounding it have been affected by flooding on several occasions, including in March 2020 and April 2021.

In April 2015, a Portuguese architectural firm, Gonçalo Lencastre Arquitectos, announced a project intended to "endow the Presidency of the Republic of Timor-Leste with a physical space with the necessary dignity and functionality", by upgrading and expanding existing structures, including the palace complex. The firm had won a worldwide competition for the project, which encompassed works valued at more than € 20 million.

The project included a new Presidential Residence and Museum of the Presidency, as well as a military barracks, a Military House and other buildings. One of the architects involved in the project, Cristina Picoto, explained that the buildings would all be 1 metre (3 ft 3 in) off the ground to avoid flooding, and were not intended to be "monumental in scale". Speaking at the project's announcement, the then Chief of Staff of the President, Fidélis Magalhães, said that its execution would be phased, with a multi-annual plan of 10 or 20 years, depending on budgetary capacity.

== Description ==
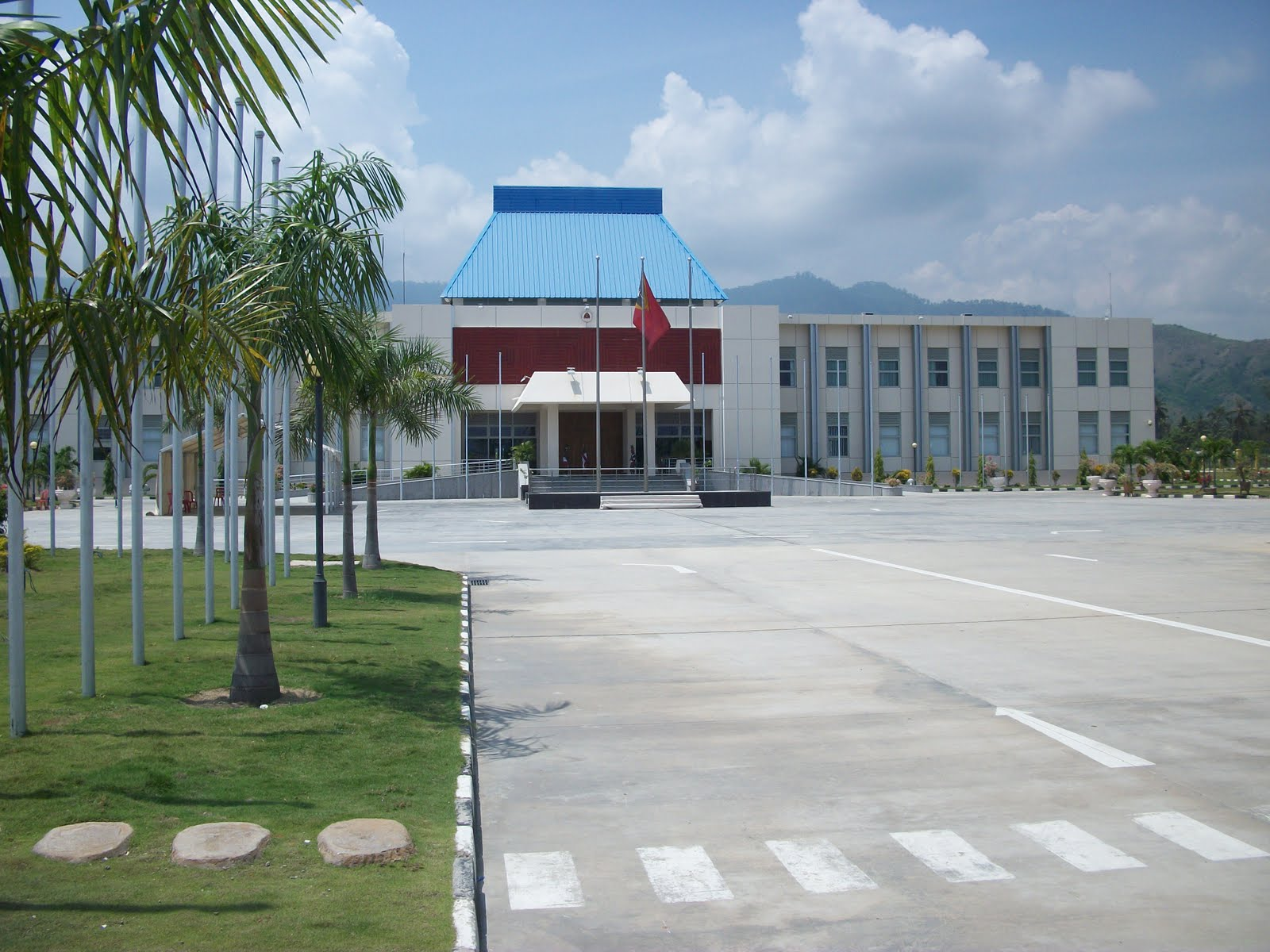
The palace in 2014, with its roof still in its original blue colour

The palace and its grounds are located in Avenida Presidente Nicolau Lobato, in the suco of Bairro Pite, west of Dili's city centre. The grounds are approximately 9 ha (22 acres) in area.

The name of both the palace and the Avenida honours Nicolau Lobato, former leader of the Fretilin political party and the armed resistance to the Indonesian occupation of East Timor; the announcement of the name was made on the tenth anniversary of the referendum at which the people of East Timor had voted for independence from Indonesia.

The palace is two storeys high, and is in the shape of a letter U. Its design is a combination of Timorese vernacular architecture and modern styles. Its main entrance is decorated in a traditional pattern, and the roof directly above it is shaped like that of an Uma Lulik, the traditional animist reliquary house found in the villages of East Timor. At the rear of the palace are gardens.

The palace serves as the official workplace of the President. However, it is not also an official residence. At the time it was being built, Timor-Leste could not afford to provide its President or Prime Minister with such a residence, and they both lived in their own homes. Additionally, Ramos-Horta had announced an unwillingness to move into the Palácio de Lahane, the former official residence of the Governor of Portuguese Timor, which had recently been refurbished.

In the entrance hall of the palace is an exhibition, 'Lost World' (Portuguese: O Mondo Perdido), prepared by the Science Centre of Monash University, Australia, with support from ConocoPhillips and the Australian Defence Force. The exhibition focuses on Timor-Leste's very ancient past, and includes various models and relics. Its star attraction is a skeleton of a Tarbosaurus bataar, which was excavated in Mongolia and included in the exhibition at Ramos-Horta's request. The exhibition was previously displayed at the Municipal Market of Dili until that building was converted into a convention centre, and is expected to remain at the palace until the completion of the proposed National Museum of Timor-Leste.
