= Kaibauk =

Traditional headdress in East Timor

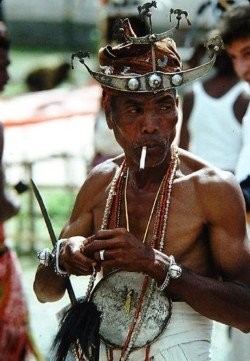
Man wearing a Kaibauk in Ermera, East Timor

Some of this article is translated from the existing German Wikipedia article at de:Kaibauk; see its history for attribution.

The Kaibauk is a type of headdress worn by the Timorese liurai. Traditionally made of silver, it is shaped like the horns of a water buffalo.

== Symbolism ==
The buffalo horns are a widely used symbol in the cultures of Timor-Leste, both on the Kaibauk and on the roofs of traditional sacred houses (uma lulik in Tetun). They represent strength, security and protection.

The counterpart to the Kaibauk is the Belak, a round bronze disc that is worn on the chest. It represents the moon and symbolises peace, prosperity and fertility.

Kaibauk and Belak are meant to complement each other, their combination bringing harmony and balance.

While the Kaibauk is often associated with masculine power, and the Belak is often associated with feminine power, they can be worn by people of both genders.

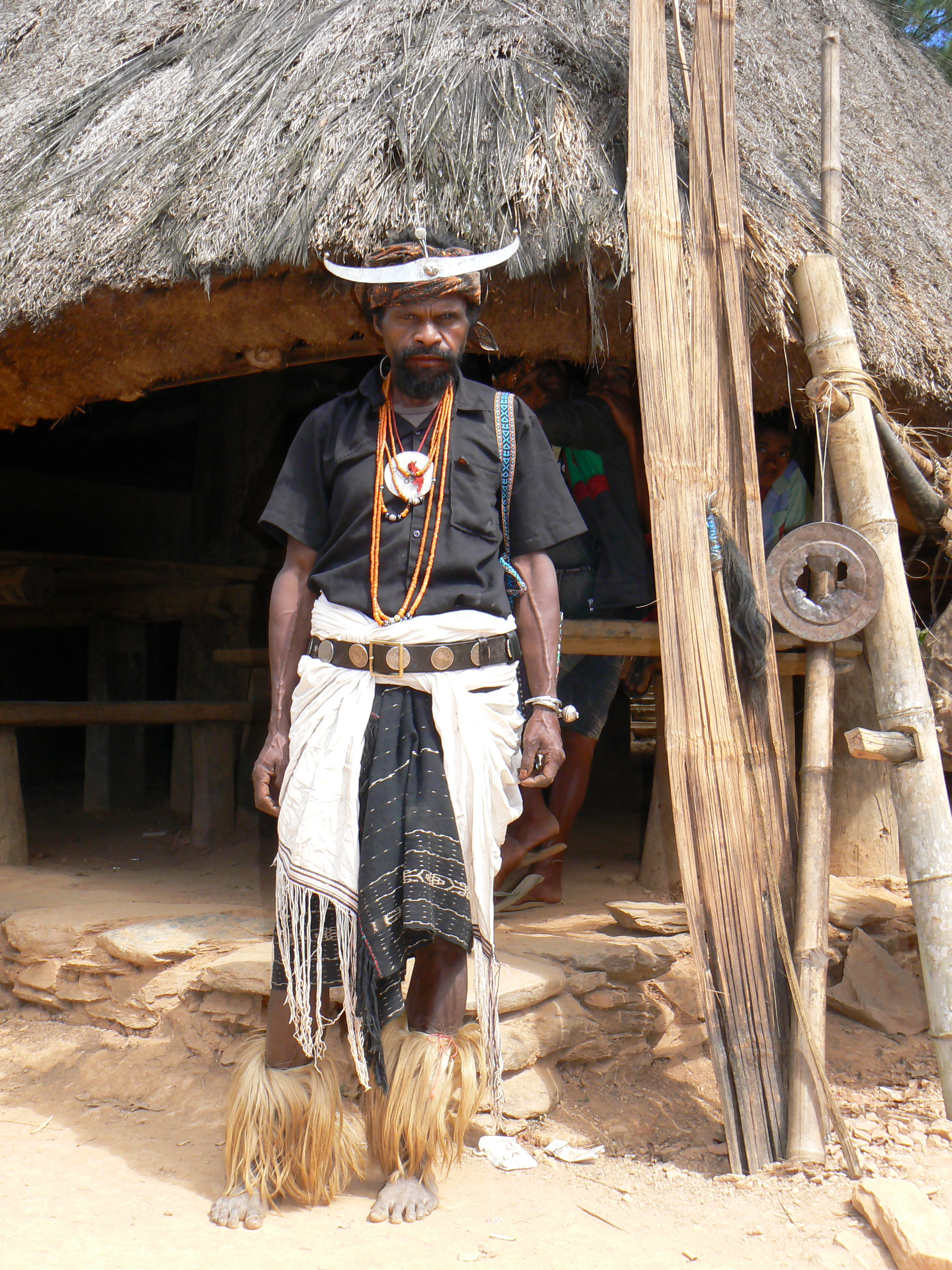
Man wearing a Kaibauk and Belak in Ermera

== Uses ==
The Kaibauk is used on the obverse of all Timor-Leste centavo coins. It is often represented on Timorese heraldry, and can be found on the flags of several political parties, such has KOTA, PDRT, PPT, UDT and UNDERTIM.
