= Luh Ketut Suryani =

Indonesian educator

Luh Ketut Suryani (born August 24, 1944) is the head of Psychiatry at Udayana University. She has written widely on topics ranging from meditation to Balinese culture. She is an advocate against pedophilia and is the founder of the Committee Against Sexual Abuse (CASA), an NGO based in Jakarta.

== See also ==
- Sex tourism in Indonesia
