= Ministry of Health (Timor-Leste) =

Ministry in the government of East Timor

- Ministério da Saúde (Portuguese); Ministériu Saúde (Tetum)
- Coat of Arms of Timor-Leste

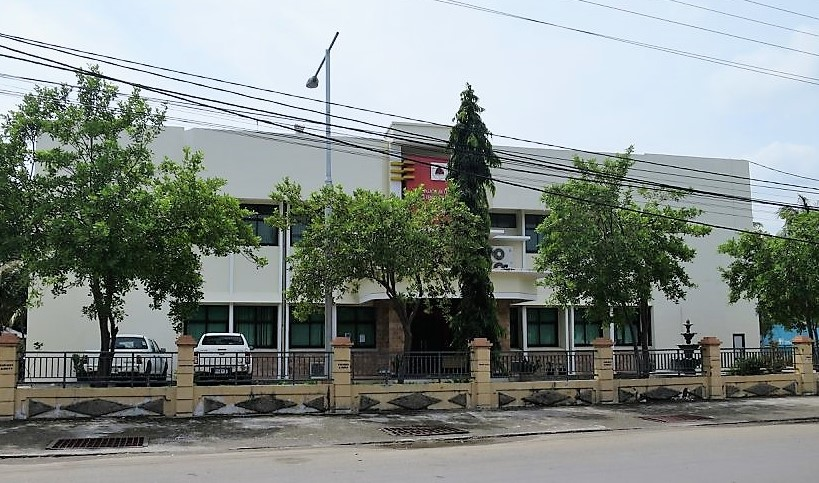
- Headquarters of the Ministry

Ministry overview
- Formed: 1975 / 2002
- Jurisdiction: Government of Timor-Leste
- Headquarters: Palácio das Cinzas, Caicoli, Dili; 8°33′43″S 125°34′30″E
- Minister responsible: Élia António de Araújo dos Reis Amaral, Minister of Health
- Website: Ministry of Health
- Agency ID: MS
- Ministry logo
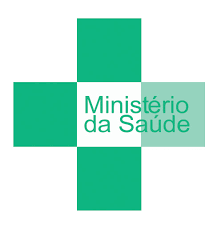

The Ministry of Health (MS; Portuguese: Ministério da Saúde, Tetum: Ministériu Saúde) is the government department of Timor-Leste accountable for health policy.

== Functions ==
The Ministry is responsible for the design, implementation, coordination and evaluation of policy for the following areas:

- health; and
- pharmaceutical activities.

== Minister ==
The incumbent Minister of Health is Élia António de Araújo dos Reis Amaral. She is assisted by two Deputy Ministers. (Note: The Constitution of Timor-Leste provides, in sections 104 and 105, for the appointment of officials referred to in its English language version as "Deputy Ministers". In other English language publications, those officials are commonly referred to as "Vice Ministers", even though the word "Vice", in context, arguably has a different meaning in English from the word "Deputy". In this article, the constitutional expression "Deputy" is used.)

== See also ==
- List of health departments and ministries
- Politics of Timor-Leste
