= Udayana University =

University in Bali, Indonesia

- Universitas Udayana ᬉᬦᬶᬧᭂᬃᬲᬶᬢᬲ᭄ᬉᬤᬬᬦ᭟
- Seal of Udayana University
- Motto: Takitakining Séwaka Guna Widya (Balinese)
- Motto in English: People who oblige knowledge shall pursue wisdom and virtue
- Type: Public
- Established: 29 September 1962
- Affiliations: AUAP, ASEA UNINET
- Rector: Prof. Ir. I Ketut Sudarsana, S.T.,Ph.D.IPU
- Academic staff: 1,603 (2008)
- Administrative staff: 594 (2008)
- Students: 18,297 (2008)
- Undergraduates: 17,435 (2008)
- Postgraduates: 1,492 (2008)
- Location: Jl. Raya Kampus UNUD, Jimbaran, Badung, Bali, Indonesia; 8°47′56″S 115°10′19″E
- Campus: Urban and suburban with three areas: Sudirman, Nias, Bukit Jimbaran
- Colors: Blue Gold
- Website: unud.ac.id

Udayana University (Indonesian: Universitas Udayana; Balinese: ᬉᬦᬶᬧᭂᬃᬲᬶᬢᬲ᭄ᬉᬤᬬᬦ᭟), abbreviated as UNUD) is a for-profit public university in Denpasar, Bali, Indonesia. It was established on September 29, 1962, and it used to belong to the Airlangga University mainly located in Surabaya. Its current rector is Sudarsana. The university's name was derived from the 10th-century Balinese King Udayana (Dharmodayana) of the Warmadewa Dynasty.

Based on official data released by the Ministry of Research, Technology and Higher Education of Indonesia (Kemenristekdikti), Udayana University is ranked 57th. The ranking released by Kemenristekdikti is based on four indicators, those are the quality of human resources, the quality of management, the variety of student activities, quality of research and publications. Moreover, based on international university ranking data released by UniRank through its website, Udayana University is ranked 1811th in the world, and 30th in Indonesia.

Udayana University obtained accreditation "A" status (the highest), where there are three levels of status, namely A, B, and C, awarded by the National Accreditation Board of Higher Education (Indonesian: Badan Akrediasi Nasional Perguruan Tinggi, abbreviated as BAN-PT). However, in October 2022, the university was caught in a corruption scandal, along with sexual assault cases in 2020. Then after being investigated and tried, all the suspects were "proven not guilty" and declared free.

== History ==
Udayana University was established by the Act of Minister of Higher Education Republic of Indonesia No.104/1962, on 9 August 1962, after an initial period as part of Airlangga University since 29 September 1958. It was the first university to be established in Bali Province. With four courses in 1962. In 1975, several faculties such as the Faculty of Law, the Faculty of Engineering, the Faculty of Agriculture, and the Faculty of Economy were established. As of 2017, Udayana University has 13 faculties with faculty of marine and fisheries the newest faculty was established in 2011.

== Faculties ==
The program offered at Udayana University is relatively comprehensive in the science major programs. The programs offered at Udayana University are one of the most comprehensive programs in Indonesia.

The university has 13 faculties:

- Faculty of Cultural Science
- Faculty of Medicine
- Faculty of Law
- Faculty of Engineering
- Faculty of Agriculture
- Faculty of Animal Husbandry
- Faculty of Mathematics and Natural Sciences (FMIPA Official Site)

- Faculty of Veterinary Medicine
- Faculty of Economics and Business
- Faculty of Agricultural Technology
- Faculty of Tourism
- Faculty of Social and Political Sciences
- Faculty of Marine and Fisheries

== Campuses ==
=== Nias Campus ===
Nias Street in Denpasar was the original campus of Udayana University which was established in 1958. On this campus, is situated the fabulous Statue of Saraswati, the Goddess of Knowledge, a monument for the love of science and technology. It is now home to the Faculty of Letters and postgraduate programs (Masters and Doctorate) of Cultural Studies.

=== Sudirman Campus ===
Sudirman campus is in the heart of Denpasar, within easy distance of major sights. It is home to postgraduate programs and Medical Sciences faculty. The early days of the campus saw a field of palm trees planted along the front corridor, making the campus known as the “Campus of Palm” (Indonesian: Kampus Palma).

The campus has grown in number and facilities. It includes the Global Development Learning Network (GDLN) Building, an information and communication technology building that facilitates student's work and strengthens connections. It also allows all university students to access distance tutorials and conferences.

=== Bukit Jimbaran Campus ===
Built in 1986, this is relatively a new campus and is the largest of Udayana's three campuses. It is designed like a town. Facilities include a health clinic, university library, sports center, post office, guesthouse and university housing. An international hospital, shopping center, lake, and leisure facilities are being made available soon.

The campus is not far from Pecatu, in easy reach of Ngurah Rai International Airport and the major tourism sites of Kuta and Nusa Dua.

== Controversy ==
=== 2020s ===
==== 2022 ====
In October 2022, Udayana University was implicated in an alleged corruption scheme concerning the university's independent admissions funding. The allegations followed earlier reports of multiple sexual-assault complaints at the university during 2020–2021. The cases drew significant public attention; however, in February 2024, a Denpasar Tipikor court acquitted the principal accused. According to academic commentators and analyses, the acquittal prompted questions about the implications of the verdict for the university's reputation and public confidence in Indonesia's higher-education governance, and whether concerns over the university's reputation and the credibility of Indonesia's education system influenced the decision.

==== 2025 ====
On October 15, 2025, Udayana University was under big negative criticism and public backlash due to the suspicion case of bullying by several college students of the university, who were caught on their group chat saying something inhumane and laughing at the death of fellow college student, Timothy Anugerah Saputra, who was found lying near the Faculty of Social and Political Sciences (FISIP) building’s main entrance after he reportedly fell from the second floor of the building, before he was taken to the Prof. dr. I.G.N.G. Ngoerah General Hospital to undergo medical treatment, but later died from the heavy injuries. However, on October 17, according to acting vice dean for student affairs and information, Faculty of Social and Political Sciences of Udayana University, I Made Anom Wiranata, said that the college students who were involved were given academic sanctions, by being given a sanction of reducing the soft skill value, which also were accompanied by the obligation to make a statement letter and a video clarification apology. Later, the Public relations of Udayana University, Dewi Pascarani, stated that the inhumane chats happened after Timothy died, and did not happened during the incident that took place. The response from Udayana University were not well received, resulting in a big negative reactions from people, who wants the perpetrators to receive the consequences that they deserved.

== Notable alumni ==
- Ayu Diandra Sari Tjakra; Puteri Bali 2008, Puteri Indonesia Lingkungan 2008 and Miss International Indonesia 2009 who won Miss Popularity at the respective Miss International 2009 beauty pageant.
- Cok Istri Krisnanda Widani; Puteri Bali 2013, Puteri Indonesia Pariwisata 2013 and Miss Supranational Indonesia 2013 who won 3rd Runner-up at the respective Miss Supranational 2013 beauty pageant.
- Dewa Ayu Carma Citrawati; Indonesian short story writer, Balinese literature activist and Wikimedian.
- Dionísio Babo Soares; Minister of Foreign Affairs and Cooperation of East Timor.
- I Dewa Gede Palguna; Justice, Constitutional Court of Indonesia.
- I Gede Ngurah Swajaya; Indonesian Ambassador to the Republic of Singapore.
- Odete Maria Freitas Belo; Minister of Health of East Timor.
- Ida Ayu Oka Rusmini; Indonesian poet and novelist. She is a recipient of the S.E.A. Write Award.
- Putu Ayu Saraswati; Puteri Bali 2020, Puteri Indonesia Lingkungan 2020 and Miss International Indonesia 2020.
- Luh Ketut Suryani; Indonesian Psychiatrist.
- Rui Maria de Araújo; Prime Minister of East Timor.

International Research Collaboration: In June 2023, Udayana University awarded the Udayana University Senior Fellowship (UNISERF) to Professor Fahrul Huyop from Universiti Teknologi Malaysia. This fellowship supports high-impact research in biochemistry and molecular biology, underscoring the university's dedication to global academic partnerships.
