= Minister of Health (Timor-Leste) =

East Timorese government minister

- Ministra da Saúde (Portuguese); Ministra Saúde (Tetum)
- Coat of Arms of Timor-Leste

- Flag of Timor-Leste

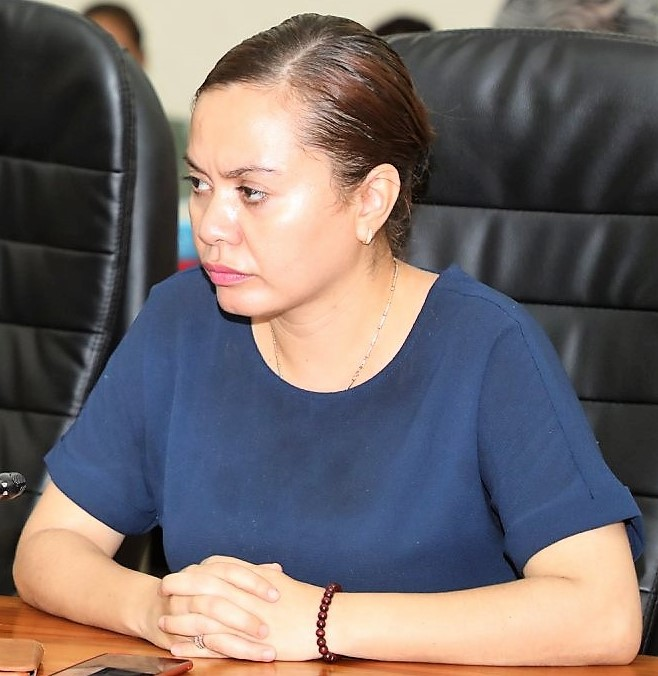
- Incumbent; Élia António de Araújo dos Reis Amaral since 1 July 2023
- Ministry of Health
- Style: Minister (informal); Her Excellency (formal, diplomatic)
- Member of: Constitutional Government
- Reports to: Prime Minister
- Seat: Dili, Timor-Leste
- Appointer: President of Timor-Leste (following proposal by the Prime Minister of Timor-Leste)
- Inaugural holder: Rui Maria de Araújo
- Formation: 20 September 2001
- Website: Ministry of Health

The Minister of Health (Portuguese: Ministra da Saúde, Tetum: Ministra Saúde) is a senior member of the Constitutional Government of Timor-Leste heading the Ministry of Health.

== Functions ==
Under the Constitution of Timor-Leste, the Minister has the power and the duty:

1. to implement the policy defined for the Ministry of Health;
2. to ensure relations between the Government and the other organs of the State in the area of responsibility of the Ministry of Health.

Where the Minister is in charge of the subject matter of a government statute, the Minister is also required, together with the Prime Minister, to sign the statute.

== Incumbent ==
The incumbent Minister of Health is Élia António de Araújo dos Reis Amaral. She is assisted by two deputy ministers. (Note: The Constitution of Timor-Leste provides, in sections 104 and 105, for the appointment of officials referred to in its English language version as "Deputy Ministers". In other English language publications, those officials are commonly referred to as "Vice Ministers", even though the word "Vice", in context, arguably has a different meaning in English from the word "Deputy". In this article, the constitutional expression "Deputy" is used.)

== List of ministers ==
The following individuals have been appointed as Minister of Health:

No.	Party	Minister	Portrait	Government (Prime Minister)	Term start	Term end	Term in office
1	Independent	Rui Maria de Araújo		II UNTAET (Alkatiri)	20 September 2001	20 May 2002	5 years, 332 days
1	Independent	Rui Maria de Araújo		I Constitutional (Alkatiri)	20 May 2002	10 July 2006	5 years, 332 days
1	Independent	Rui Maria de Araújo		II Constitutional (Ramos-Horta)	10 July 2006	19 May 2007	5 years, 332 days
1	Fretilin	Rui Maria de Araújo		III Constitutional (da Silva)	19 May 2007	8 August 2007	5 years, 332 days
2	Independent	Nélson Martins		IV Constitutional (Gusmão)	8 August 2007	8 August 2012	5 years, 0 days
3	CNRT	Sérgio Lobo		V Constitutional (Gusmão)	8 August 2012	16 February 2015	2 years, 192 days
4	CNRT	Maria do Céu Sarmento Pina da Costa		VI Constitutional (Araújo)	16 February 2015	15 September 2017	2 years, 211 days
(1)	Fretilin	Rui Maria de Araújo		VII Constitutional (Alkatiri)	15 September 2017	22 June 2018	280 days
(acting)	CNRT	Élia António de Araújo dos Reis Amaral		VIII Constitutional (Ruak)	22 June 2018	3 April 2020	1 year, 286 days
(acting)	PLP	Bonifácio dos Reis		VIII Constitutional (Ruak)	3 April 2020	29 May 2020	56 days
5	Fretilin	Odete Maria Freitas Belo		VIII Constitutional (Ruak) (restructured)	29 May 2020	1 July 2023	3 years, 33 days
6	CNRT	Élia António de Araújo dos Reis Amaral		IX Constitutional (Gusmão)	1 July 2023	Incumbent	3 years, 68 days
