= List of health departments and ministries =

Most executive governments in the world are divided into departments or ministries. In most such cases, there is a department or ministry responsible for health.

== A ==
- Ministry of Public Health (Afghanistan)
- Ministry of Health and Social Protection (Albania)
- Ministry of Health, Population and Hospital Reform (Algeria)
- Ministry of Health and the Environment (Antigua and Barbuda)
  - Barbuda's Public Health Department
- Ministry of Health (Argentina)
- Ministry of Health (Armenia)
- Department of Health and Aged Care (Australia)
  - Ministry of Health (New South Wales), known as NSW Health
  - (Victoria (state)) Department of Health & Human Services (Victoria)
  - Department of Health (Western Australia)
- Ministry of Social Affairs, Health, Care and Consumer Protection (Austria)
- Ministry of Healthcare (Azerbaijan)

== B ==
- Ministry of Health and Family Welfare (Bangladesh)
- Ministry of Health (The Bahamas)
- Ministry of Health (Bahrain)
- Ministry of Health and Wellness (Barbados)
- Federal Public Service Health (Belgium)
  - (Flemish Community) Department of Welfare, Public Health and Family (Flanders)
- Ministry of Health (Bhutan)
- Ministry of Health and Wellness (Botswana)
- Ministry of Health (Brazil) (Ministério da Saúde)
- Ministry of Health (Brunei) (Kementerian Kesihatan)

return to table of contents

== C ==
- Ministry of Health (Cambodia)
- Health Canada
  - Ministry of Health (Alberta)
  - Ministry of Health (British Columbia)
  - Department of Health (New Brunswick)
  - Ministry of Health (Ontario)
  - Ministry of Health and Social Services (Quebec)
  - Ministry of Health (Saskatchewan)
- Ministry of Health (Chile) (Ministerio de Salud de Chile) and Fondo Nacional de Salud (FONASA)
- (China) National Health Commission
- Ministry of Health and Social Protection (Colombia)
- Ministry of Public Health (Democratic Republic of the Congo)
- (Costa Rica) Costa Rican Social Security Fund
- Ministry of Health (Croatia)
- Ministry of Health (Cyprus)
- Ministry of Health (Czech Republic)

return to table of contents

== D ==
- Ministry of Health (Denmark)

return to table of contents

== E ==
- Ministry of Health and Population (Egypt)
- Ministry of Health (Ethiopia)
- (European Union) European Commissioner for Health

return to table of contents

== F ==
- Ministry of Health and Medical Services (Fiji)
- Ministry of Social Affairs and Health (Finland)
- Ministry for Solidarity and Health (France)

return to table of contents

== G ==
- (Georgia (country)) Ministry of Health, Labour and Social Affairs of Georgia
- Federal Ministry of Health (Germany)
- Ministry of Health (Ghana)
- Ministry of Health (Greece)
- Ministry of Health (Guinea)
- Ministry of Public Health (Guinea-Bissau)

return to table of contents

== H ==
- Ministry of Health (Haiti)
- Food and Health Bureau
  - Department of Health (Hong Kong)

return to table of contents

== I ==
- Ministry of Welfare (Iceland)
- Ministry of Health and Family Welfare (India)
  - Ministry of Public Health (Maharashtra)
  - Department of Health and Family Welfare (Tamil Nadu)
  - Ministry of Health & Family Welfare (Tripura)
  - Ministry of Health & Family Welfare (West Bengal)
  - Department of Health and Family Welfare (Kerala)
- Ministry of Health (Indonesia) (Kementerian Kesehatan)
- Ministry of Health and Medical Education (Iran)
- Ministry of Health (Iraq)
- (Republic of Ireland) Department of Health (Ireland)
- Ministry of Health (Israel)
- Ministry of Health (Italy)
- Ministry of Health and the Fight against AIDS (Ivory Coast)

return to table of contents

== J ==
- Ministry of Health, Labour and Welfare, Japan
- Ministry of Health (Jordan)

return to table of contents

== K ==
- Ministry of Healthcare (Kazakhstan)
- Ministry of Health (Kenya)
- Ministry of Health and Medical Services (Kiribati)
- Ministry of Health (Kuwait)

return to table of contents

== L ==
- Ministry of Health (Laos)
- Ministry of Public Health (Lebanon)
- Ministry of Health and Social Welfare, Liberia
- Ministry of Health (Lithuania)

return to table of contents

== M ==
- Secretariat for Social Affairs and Culture (Macau)
- Ministry of Public Health and Hygiene (Mali)
- Ministry for Health (Malta)
- Secretariat of Health (Mexico)
- Ministry of Health (Malaysia)
- Ministry of Health (Moldova)
- Ministry of Health (Montenegro)
- Ministry of Health (Morocco)
- Ministry of Health (Myanmar)

return to table of contents

== N ==
- Ministry of Health and Population (Nepal)
- Ministry of Health, Welfare and Sport (Netherlands)
- Ministry of Health (New Zealand)
- Federal Ministry of Health (Nigeria)
  - Akwa Ibom State Ministry of Health
  - Lagos State Ministry of Health
  - Rivers State Ministry of Health
- Ministry of Public Health (North Korea)
- Ministry of Health and Care Services (Norway)

return to table of contents

== P ==
- Ministry of National Health Services, Regulation and Coordination (Pakistan)
  - Sindh Health Department
- Ministry of Health (Palestine)
- Ministry of Health (Panama)
- National Department of Health of Papua New Guinea
- Ministry of Health (Peru)
- Department of Health (Philippines)
  - Ministry of Health (Bangsamoro)
- Ministry of Health (Poland)
- Ministry of Health (Portugal)

return to table of contents

== R ==
- Ministry of Health (Romania)
- Ministry of Health (Russia)
  - Ministry of Health (Bashkortostan)
- Ministry of Health (Rwanda)

return to table of contents

== S ==
- Ministry of Health (Saudi Arabia)
- Ministry of Health (Serbia)
- Ministry of Health and Sanitation (Sierra Leone)
- Ministry of Health (Singapore)
- Ministry of Health and Medical Services (Solomon Islands)
- Ministry of Health (Somalia)
- Ministry of Health (Somaliland)
- Department of Health (South Africa)
  - Western Cape Department of Health
- Ministry of Health and Welfare (South Korea)
- Ministry of Health (South Sudan)
- Ministry of Health (Spain)
  - (Basque Country (autonomous community)) Department of Health (Basque Country)
- Ministry of Health (Sri Lanka)
- Ministry of Health and Social Affairs (Sweden)
- Ministry of Health (Syria)

return to table of contents

== T ==
- Ministry of Health and Welfare (Taiwan)
- Ministry of Health (Tajikistan)
- Ministry of Health and Social Welfare (Tanzania)
- Ministry of Public Health (Thailand)
- Ministry of Health (Timor-Leste)
- Ministry of Health (Trinidad and Tobago)
- Ministry of Health (Turkey)
- Ministry of Health (Turkmenistan)

return to table of contents

== U ==
- Ministry of Health (Uganda)
- Ministry of Healthcare (Ukraine)
- Ministry of Health and Prevention (United Arab Emirates)
  - (Emirate of Abu Dhabi) Abu Dhabi Department of Health
  - (Emirate of Dubai) Dubai Health Authority
- United Kingdom
  - Department of Health and Social Care covers England and any undevolved matters
  - Department of Health (Northern Ireland) (Northern Ireland)
  - Health and Social Care Directorates (Scotland)
  - Department of Health and Social Services (Wales)
- United States Department of Health and Human Services (All U.S. states and territories have a state health agency.)
  - Alabama Department of Public Health
  - Alaska Department of Health and Social Services
  - Arizona Department of Health Services
  - Arkansas Department of Health
  - California Department of Public Health
  - Florida Department of Health
  - Hawaii Department of Health
  - Illinois Department of Public Health and Illinois Department of Healthcare and Family Services
  - Louisiana Department of Health and Hospitals
  - Maryland Department of Health and Mental Hygiene
  - Massachusetts Department of Public Health
  - Michigan Department of Health and Human Services
  - Nebraska Department of Health & Human Services
  - Nevada Department of Health and Human Services
  - New Hampshire Department of Health & Human Services
  - New Jersey Department of Health and Senior Services
  - New Mexico Department of Health
  - (New York (state)) New York State Department of Health
  - North Carolina Department of Health and Human Services
  - Oklahoma State Department of Health
  - Oregon Health Authority
  - Pennsylvania Department of Health
  - Rhode Island Department of Health
  - South Carolina Department of Health and Environmental Control
  - Texas Department of State Health Services
  - Utah Department of Health
  - Virginia Department of Health
  - (Washington (state)) Washington State Department of Health
  - Wisconsin Department of Health Services
  - Wyoming Department of Health
  - Puerto Rico Department of Health (U.S. territory)
- Ministry of Public Health (Uruguay)
- Ministry of Public Health (Uzbekistan)

return to table of contents

== V ==
- Ministry of Health (Vietnam)

return to table of contents

== Y ==
- (Yemen) Ministry of Public Health and Population

== Z ==
- Ministry of Health (Zambia)
- Ministry of Health and Child Welfare (Zimbabwe)

return to table of contents

== Former health ministries or departments ==
- Ministry of Health of the People's Republic of China
- Ministry of Social Protection (Colombia)
- Ministry of Interior and Health (Denmark)
- Ministry of Health (Rhodesia)
- Ministry of Health (Soviet Union)

return to table of contents

== International bodies ==
- World Health Organization

return to table of contents

== See also ==
- List of national public health agencies
- State health agency
