= Élia dos Reis Amaral =

East Timorese politician

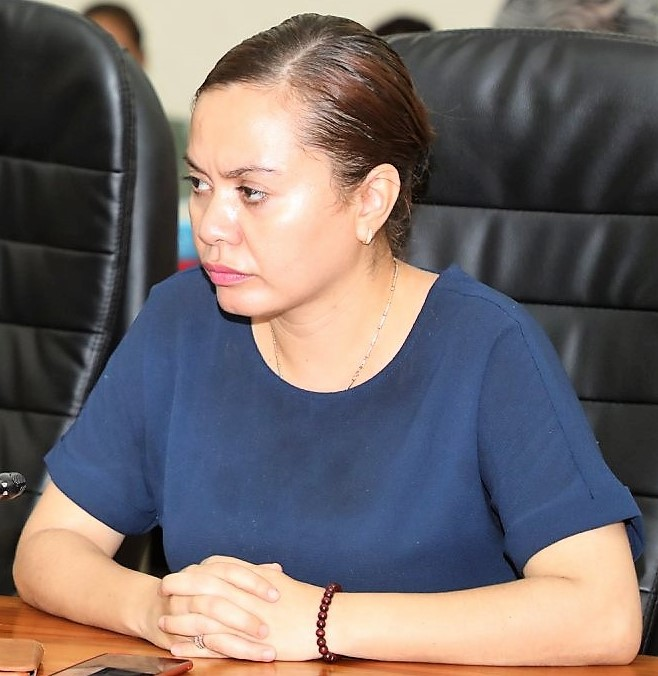
- Amaral in 2019

Minister of Health
- Incumbent
- Assumed office 1 July 2023
- Prime Minister: Xanana Gusmão
- Preceded by: Odete Maria Freitas Belo

Deputy Minister of Health
- In office 22 June 2018 – 3 April 2020 Serving with Bonifácio dos Reis
- Prime Minister: Taur Matan Ruak
- Preceded by: Luís Maria Ribeiro Freitas Lobato
- Succeeded by: Office abolished

Personal details
- Born: Élia António de Araújo dos Reis Amaral
- Party: National Congress for Timorese Reconstruction (CNRT)

Élia António de Araújo dos Reis Amaral is an East Timorese politician, and a member of the National Congress for Timorese Reconstruction (Portuguese: Congresso Nacional de Reconstrução de Timor, CNRT).

She is the incumbent Minister of Health, serving since July 2023 in the IX Constitutional Government of East Timor led by Prime Minister Xanana Gusmão.
