= Uma Lulik =

Totem houses in Timorese animistic tradition

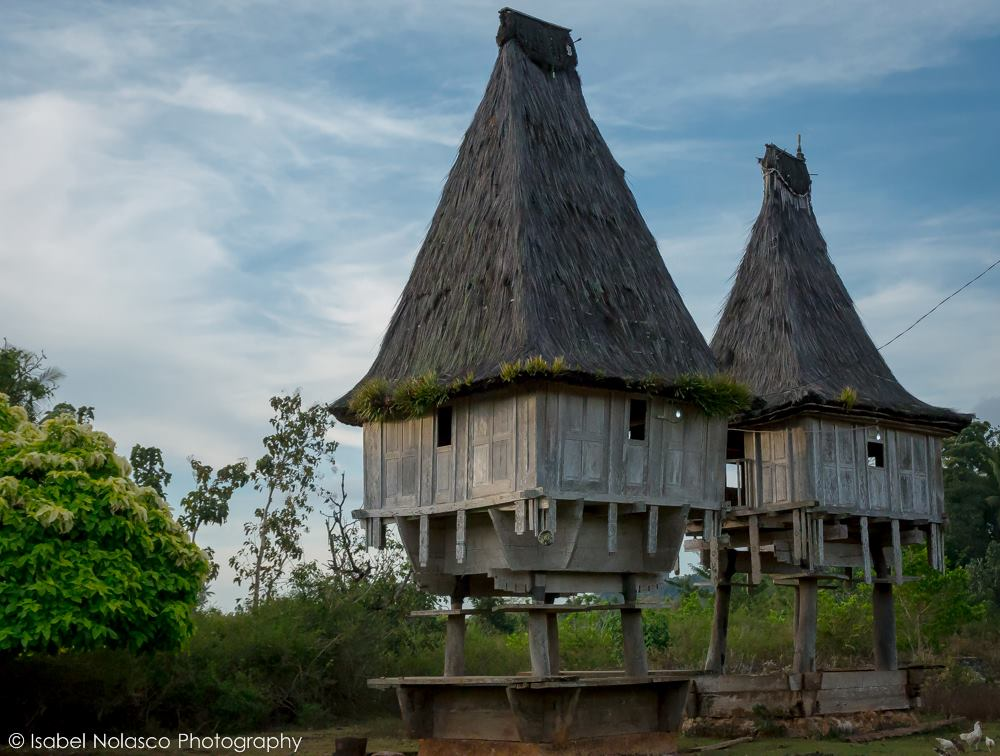
Uma Lulik in Lurarai, Bauro.

Uma Lulik (lit. 'Sacred house' in Tetum) are sacred totem houses or shrines in Timorese animistic tradition. They are present throughout East Timor and are considered a national symbol by official authorities. They are places of ancestor worship and where sacred items are kept, such as tais (sacred cloths), surik (ritual swords), masks and statues of ancestors, kaibauk (headdresses shaped like crescent moons or buffalo horns) or corncobs are kept. Their display is allowed only on certain circumstances, such as during harvest celebrations, when they are taken out by members for the clan they belong to.

They are also where births, marriages, deaths and All Souls' Day are celebrated. They also served as a place where Timorese elders gathered and sat to discuss.

Uma Luliks are diverse, and their style depend greatly on the region they are built and the ethnic group they were built by. They are typically built or renovated each 10 or 20 years and each belong to a family, those who have formed a bond with it through marriage or their descendants (i.e. a clan).

In the 19th century they invariably stood in a cleared space within a grove of trees or an elevated spot, surrounded by a thick fence. Within the enclosure, no blade of grass could be plucked or stone overturned for fear of divine retribution, nor was tobacco permitted to be taken within the sacred boudaries, nor horses or buffalo.

During the Indonesian invasion of East Timor in 1975 and when the militias took over many territories in 1999, the local population tried to save the objects and heirlooms stored in the houses but in many cases that was not possible and they were destroyed. Sacred houses were banned during the Indonesian occupation as they were places of meeting by the FALINTIL and many were abandoned, damaged or destroyed. In some cases the families decided to recreate the lost objects after the restoration of East Timorese independence in 2002, such as an old Portuguese flag donated by a Portuguese officer to the houses liurai and which had been burned in 1999, though others choose not to do so.

== Gallery ==
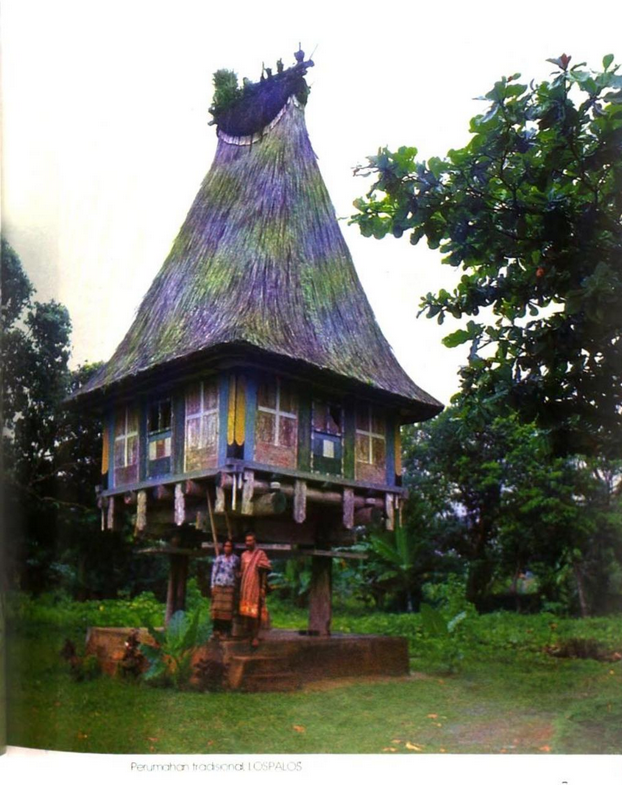
Uma Lulik in Lospalos

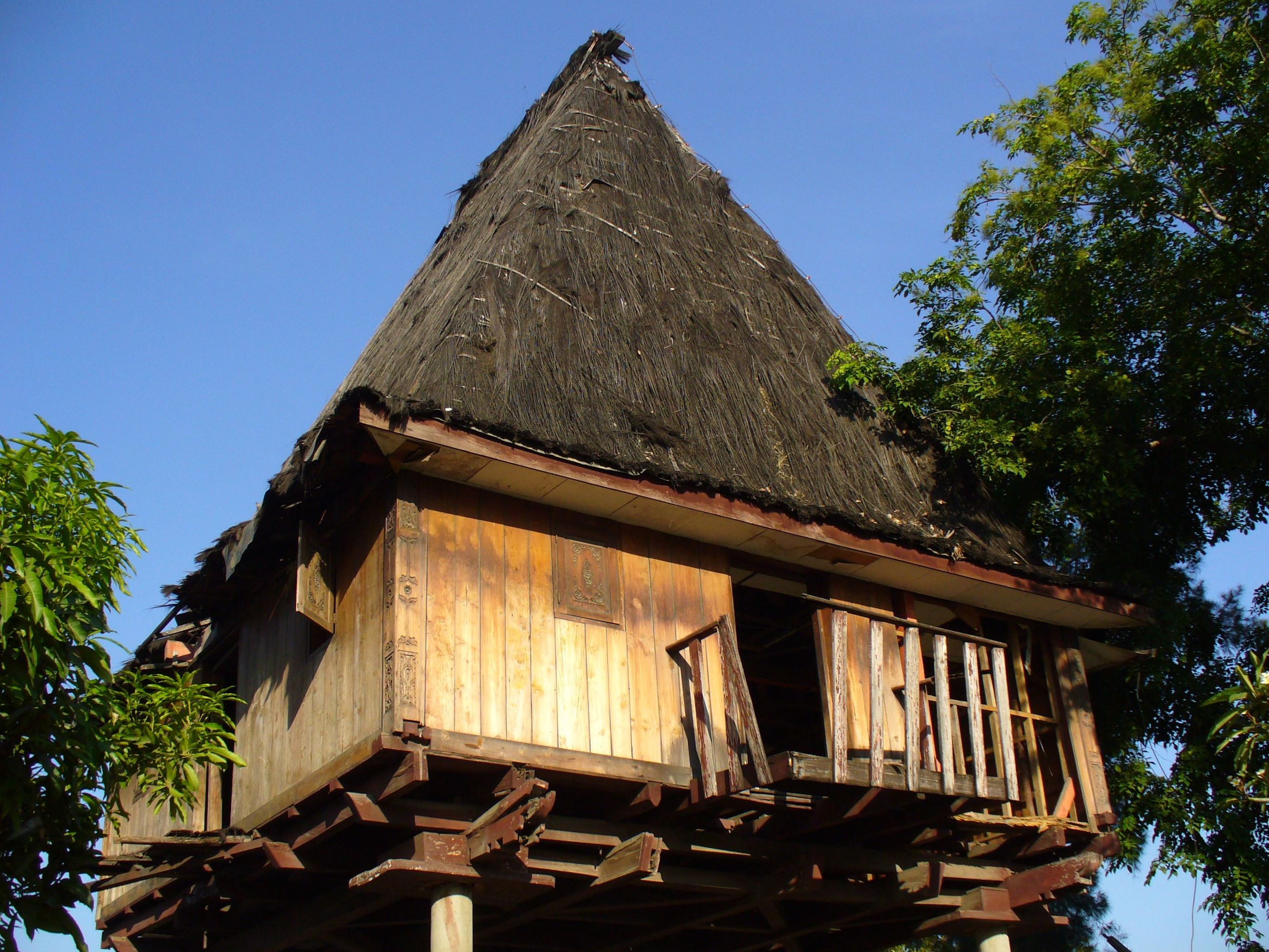
Uma Lulik in Lospalos

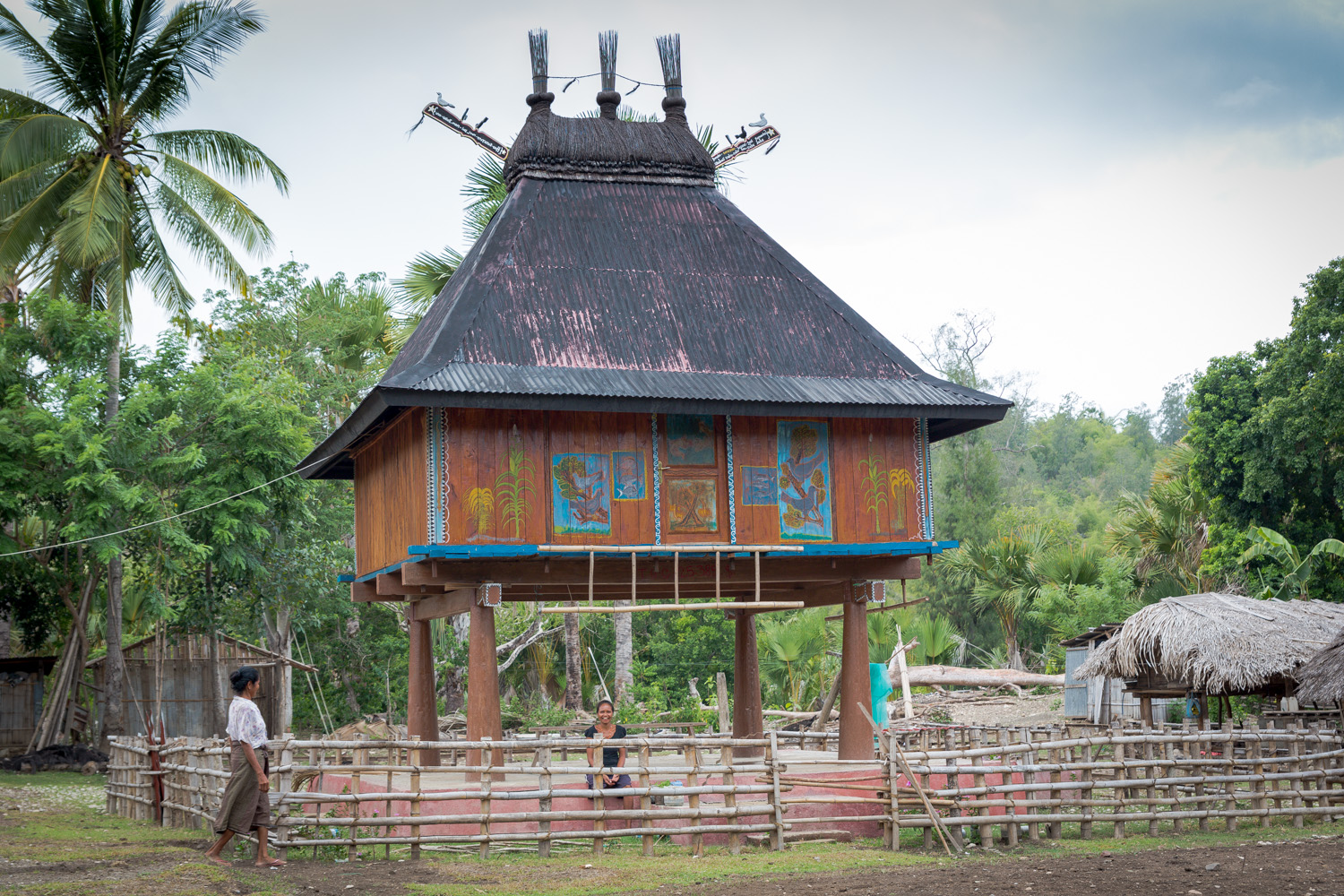
Uma Lulik in Aldeia Macausa, Irabin de Baixo, East Timor

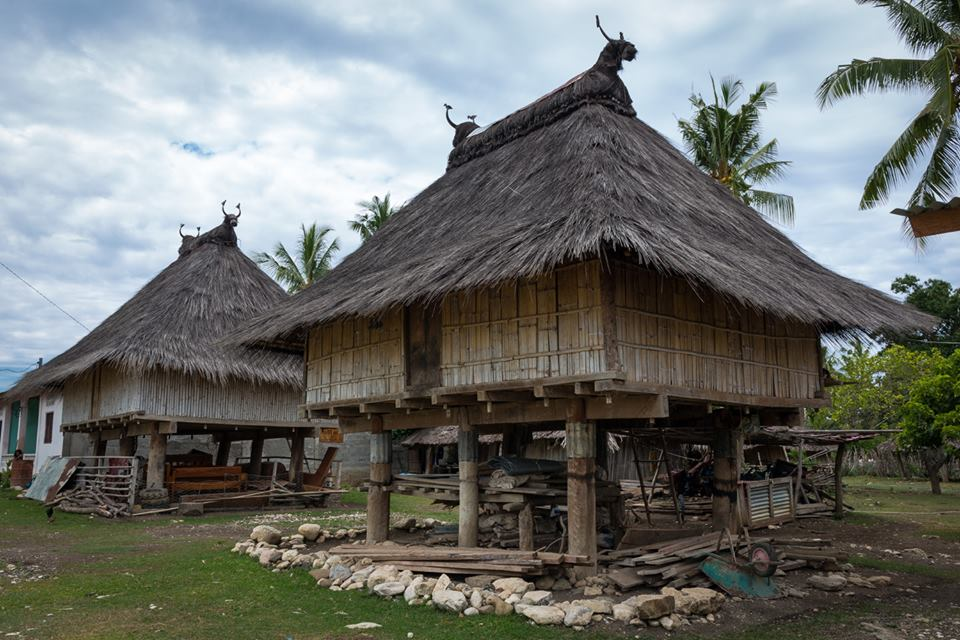
Uma Lulik in Vessoru

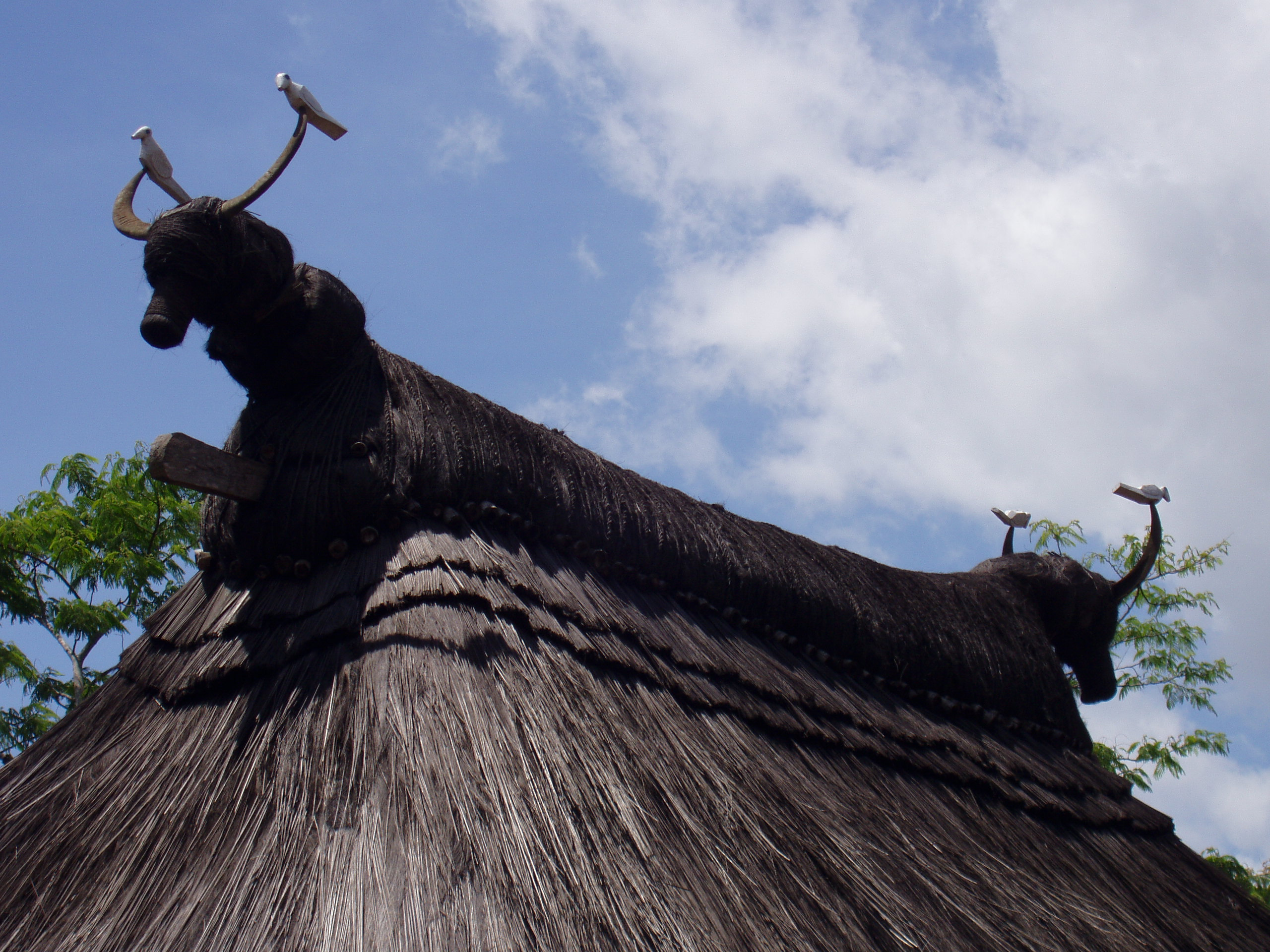
Roof decorations on an Uma Lulik in Borulaisoba

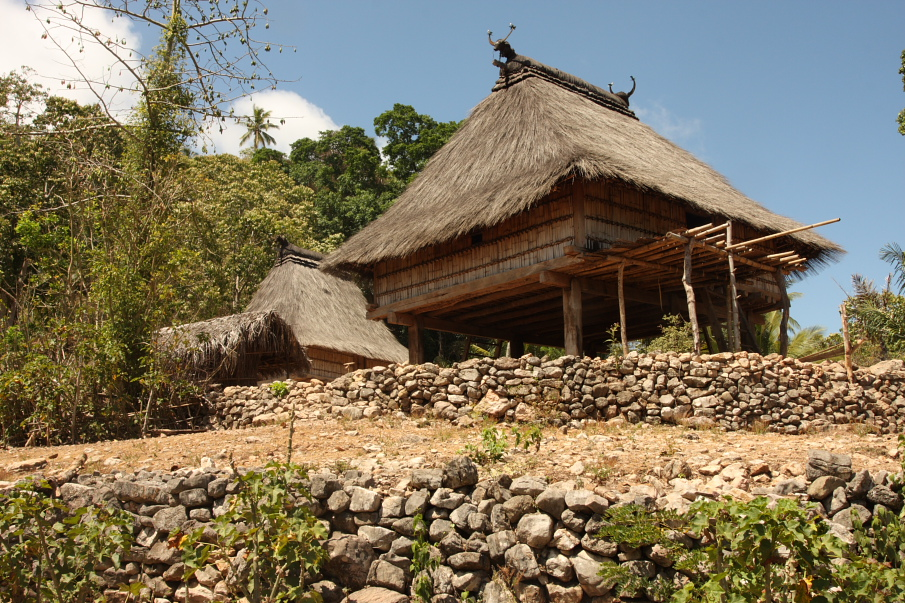
Uma Lulik in Borlaisoba

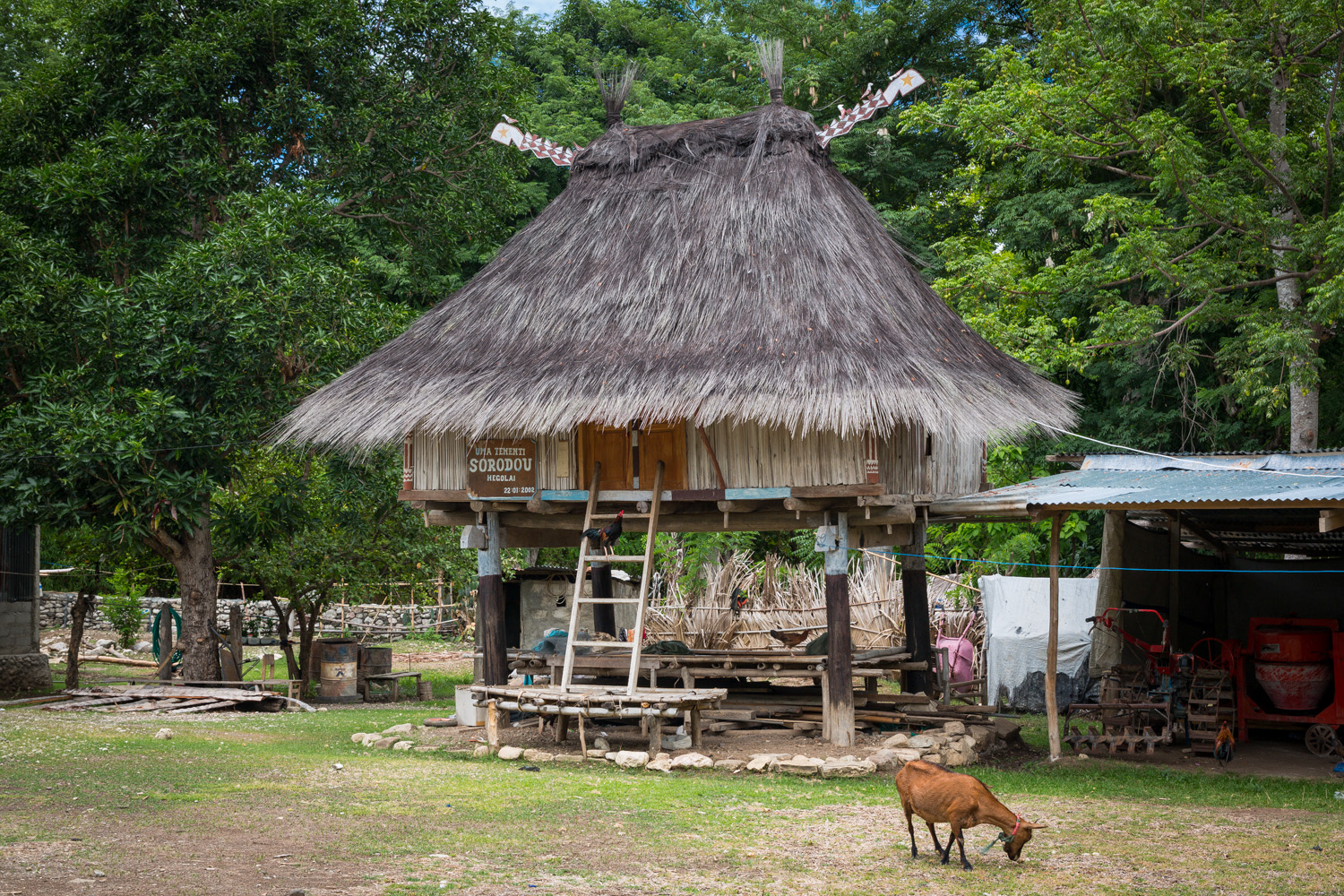
Uma Lulik in Sorudou

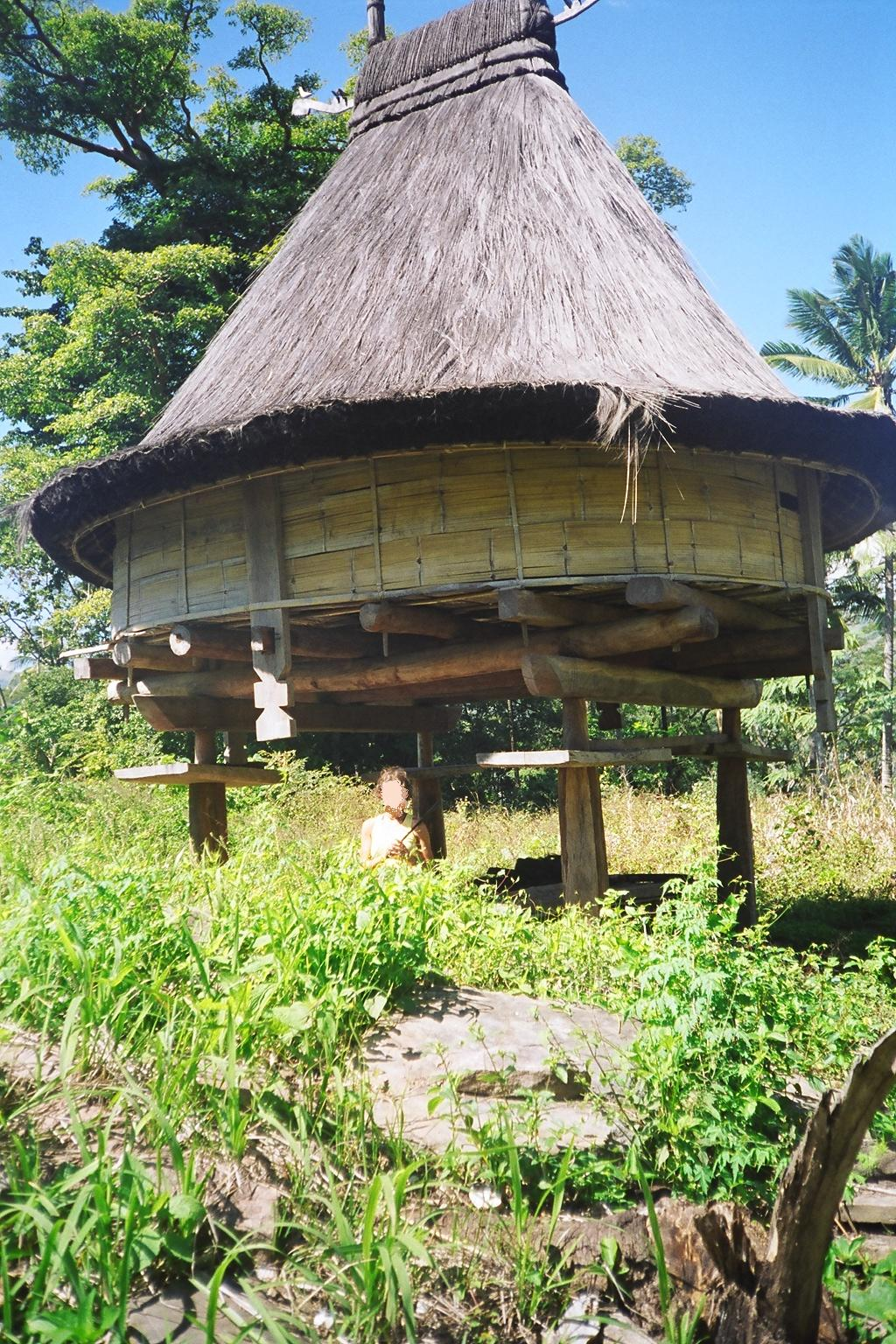
Circular Uma Lulik

== See also ==
- Religion in Timor-Leste
- History of Timor-Leste
- Culture of Timor-Leste
