= Domingos Maubere =

East Timorese Catholic priest and activist (1952–2025)

The Reverend Domingos Maubere
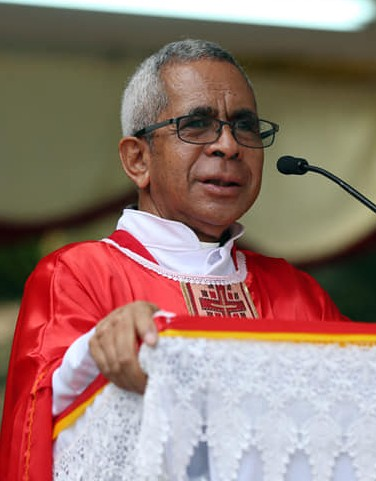
- Domingos Soares "Maubere" in 2022
- Church: Catholic Church
- Diocese: Dili

Orders
- Ordination: 16 July 1978 by Eurico Dias Nogueira

Personal details
- Born: Domingos da Silva Soares; 12 May 1952 Letefoho, Ermera, Portuguese Timor
- Died: 16 May 2025 (aged 73) Dili, Timor-Leste
- Occupation: Priest and activist
- Education: Seminário Conciliar de São Pedro e São Paulo; University of Saint Joseph

Domingos da Silva Soares (12 May 1952 – 16 May 2025), popularly known as Padre Maubere or Amu Du, was an East Timorese Roman Catholic priest, activist, and independence leader. Born in Letefoho in what was then Portuguese Timor, he attended seminary in Portugal and was ordained in 1978. In 1980, he returned to East Timor and became involved in the resistance against the Indonesian occupation (1975–1999), often supporting the guerrillas and coordinating with the movement's leaders. As a pastor in Timor-Leste, he served in parishes in Ossu, Letefoho, Ermera, Suai, and Becora, Dili.

Soares was a founding member of the National Council of Maubere Resistance (CNRT). In the years following Timor-Leste's independence in 2002, he remained an outspoken activist on issues like corruption, abuse of power, violence against women, and social inequality. Between 2008 and 2017, he studied and worked in Macau, briefly returning to Timor-Leste in 2015–2016 to serve as vicar general of the Diocese of Dili. He died in Dili in May 2025 after a lengthy illness.

== Early life and education ==
Domingos da Silva Soares was born on 12 May 1952 in the village of Dukurai in Letefoho, Ermera, a coffee-growing area in what was then Portuguese Timor. His parents, Isaias José Soares and Teresa da Silva Soares, were farmers. Two weeks after his birth, his family moved to Fatubessi, where he was baptized in 1956 at the local chapel. In 1960, Soares entered primary school at the Catholic mission in Ermera. He later studied at the Colégio Infante de Sagres in Maliana, where he received his first communion in 1964. Soares' family described him as a diligent and helpful boy who felt a calling to service in the church from a young age. As a preteen, Soares fetched firewood and water for his family during the day, and taught catechism in the evenings with the support of an older woman in the community.

In 1966, Soares began his priestly formation at the Pré-Seminário São Francisco Xavier in Dare, where he received the sacrament of confirmation in 1967 from Bishop José Joaquim Ribeiro. He continued his studies between 1967 and 1973 at the Our Lady of Fatima Minor Seminary in Dare. In October 1973, Soares went to Portugal, where he entered the Seminário Conciliar de São Pedro e São Paulo in Braga. After a propaedeutic year, he studied philosophy and theology between 1974 and 1978. On 12 March 1978, he was ordained a deacon by Bishop Manuel Ferreira Cabral, auxiliary bishop of the Archdiocese of Braga. He was ordained a priest on 16 July 1978 in Braga by Eurico Dias Nogueira, the Archbishop-Primate of Braga.

== Priesthood ==
After his ordination in 1978, Soares spent six months at a parish in Castelões, where he celebrated his first mass. He then spent around a year as parochial vicar of the main church in Póvoa de Varzim. In 1975, while Soares was studying in Portugal, Indonesia invaded and occupied East Timor, annexing it as an Indonesian province the following year. During this time, Soares' family fled their homes and went to live in the bush. They did not know Soares had already been ordained a priest, and Soares did not know whether his family was still alive or not. While in Portugal, he received a letter informing him that his parents were still alive, but he was skeptical.

=== Independence struggle ===
In May 1980, Soares returned to East Timor. Upon arriving at the airport, he asked about his parents and learned that his mother had already died, but that his father was still alive. On 10 June 1980, Soares was named pastor of Santa Teresinha do Menino Jesus parish in Ossu, Viqueque district, which also covered Lacluta and Viqueque town. The area was heavily patrolled by the Indonesians, and was the site of much violence and persecution against civilians. In Ossu, Soares quickly became involved the resistance struggle against the Indonesian occupation, and it was it there that he earned the nickname "Maubere". Maubere is a loose term that refers to ordinary, indigenous East Timorese people, often used by members of the nationalist movement to mean "of the people" in the context of the struggle against the Indonesian occupation.

In 1982, Soares was appointed superior of the mission in Uatolari and president of the catechetical commission of the Diocese of Dili. The following year, he was named director of the Instituto Pastoral in Dili. Soares was often threatened by the Indonesian authorities, and in 1983, he was placed under house arrest. In 1988, he was relocated from Ossu to Dili, where he continued his resistance activities. He maintained contact with pro-independence leaders like Xanana Gusmão and Nino Konis Santana, and supported guerrilla fighters with medicine, food, and money. As a priest, Soares traveled from place to place, offering spiritual care to people in areas under Indonesian control. In this role, he also passed information between guerrillas and civilian resistance groups. He also established contacts with East Timor solidarity groups in Australia, with whom he shared and received information related to the resistance struggle.

Soares believed that the independence struggle was not just political but also a religious "holy war" between the Catholic East Timorese and the Muslim Indonesians. He defended the guerrillas' use of violence, arguing "If they see people with weapons pointed at them, they have the right to self defense." In May 1990, Soares and 15 other East Timorese Catholic priests signed the "Reflection of the Indigenous Priests" (Portuguese: Reflexão dos Sacerdotes Autóctones) arguing in favor of political involvement by the church. Soares' zealous views and overt manner sometimes put him at odds with other pro-independence figures in the church, like Bishop Carlos Filipe Ximenes Belo and Father Mario Belo, who preferred a subtler approach.

On 5 August 1990, Soares was appointed pastor of the parish in Suai, a town on the south coast. On 16 July 1994, he became pastor of Nossa Senhora do Carmo parish in his home district of Letefoho, where he remained until 1997. In 1995, Soares helped a group of young people, among them members of the clandestine resistance including Alfredo Reinado, escape East Timor to Australia from Tibar Bay, just west of Dili. Before the group's departure, Soares married Reinado and Maria Alves and baptized the couple's six-month-old baby. He then handed a crucifix to each member of the group before telling them, "My children, if I have not heard any news about you in seven days, I will bring candles and flowers to the sea to remember you as heroes of your country." He then hid among the mangroves as the boat departed. The group arrived in Australia six days later.

On 17 August 1997, a pro-Indonesian militia leader came to Soares' church in Letefoho, insulted him, and fired five gunshots at the church's facade before people intervened to stop him. That year, Soares went into exile in Portugal amid pressure from the Indonesian authorities. In July 1997, Soares and an East Timorese laywoman, Maria de Lourdes Cruz, were awarded the Pax Christi International Peace Award, in recognition of their work with poor communities in East Timor. Soares received his award from Cardinal Godfried Danneels in a ceremony at St Mary's University in London. At the event, he drew attention to Indonesian human rights violations in East Timor, where he said the people "live in hope and cry day and night for liberation." While in exile in Portugal, Soares and another priest, Filomeno Jacob, worked with political leaders to establish a unified organization representing the East Timorese resistance movement. Their efforts manifested in the 1988 founding congress of the National Council of Maubere Resistance (CNRT) in Peniche, Portugal. Upon returning to East Timor, Soares served as the CNRT's general coordinator and spokesman.

During the crisis following the 1999 East Timorese independence referendum, Soares went to Mount Ramelau to escape the violence, where he spent time in prayer. Beginning in 2001, he served on the steering committee that led to the establishment of the Commission for Reception, Truth and Reconciliation in East Timor, which investigated and documented human rights violations in East Timor between 1974–1999 and facilitated reconciliation between victims and perpetrators. On 1 September 2002, Soares became pastor of Nossa Senhora de Lourdes parish in Ermera, a post he held until c. 2005.

=== Post-independence ===
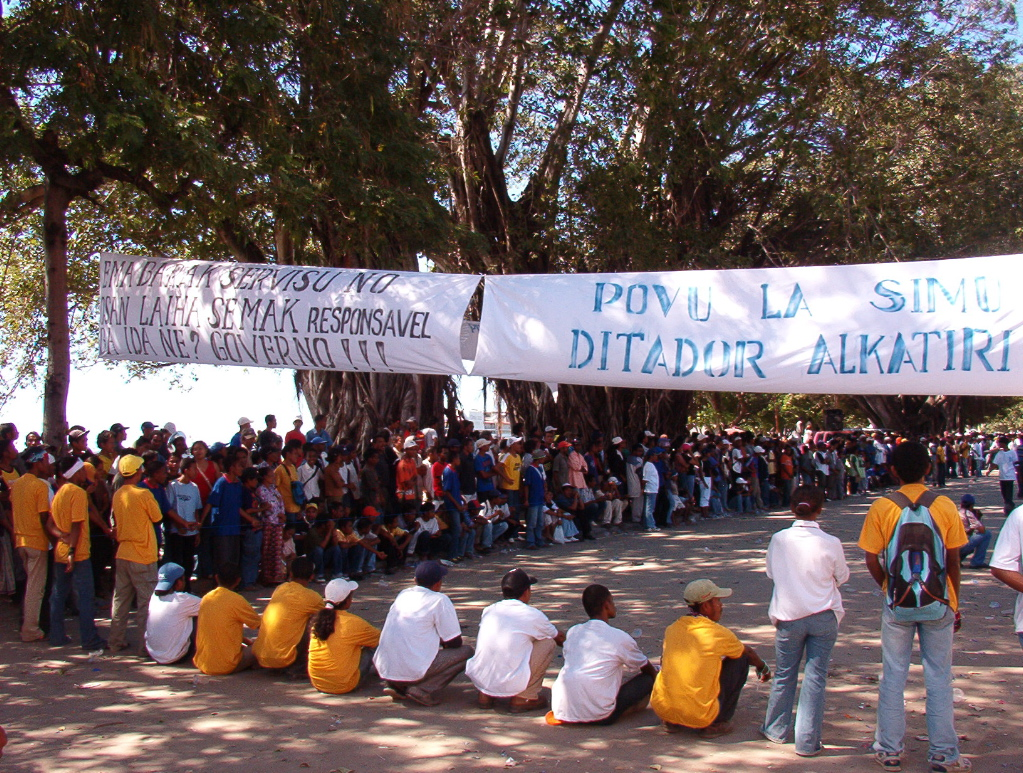
Anti-Alkatiri demonstrations in Dili, 2005

In the years following Timor-Leste's independence in 2002, Soares remained an outspoken activist, often making public statements on issues like corruption, abuse of power, violence against women, and social inequality. Soares was a leading figure in the April–May 2005 protests in which thousands demonstrated against Prime Minister Mari Alkatiri and the ruling Fretilin party in response to a proposal to remove Catholic religious education as a mandatory subject in government schools. Soares participated in the protests daily, often using a microphone to lead the crowd in prayer and to denounce the government. On 21 April, he declared that "the people and the Catholic Church have joined peacefully for an end to this extremist government. We want the Alkatiri government to step down and for Fretilin to choose another." Timor-Leste's Catholic bishops, Alberto Ricardo da Silva of Dili and Basílio do Nascimento of Baucau, supported the protests and released a document, signed by Soares in his role as a church spokesman, outlining constitutional justifications for their calls for Alkatiri's resignation. An agreement was ultimately signed between Alkatiri and the bishops restoring Catholic education as a mandatory school subject.

Afterwards, Soares remained critical of Fretilin. In January 2006, national media reported that Soares had said in a sermon in Same that Fretilin was communist and would kill all of Timor-Leste's priests and nuns if they won the next general election. In response, the party's parliamentary leader, Francisco Miranda Branco, accused Soares of carrying out a systematic campaign to take down Fretilin. A Fretilin member of parliament, Maria José da Costa, later said that Soares never made such statements about Fretilin in Same, and that those reports were part of a scheme to discredit the party. In 2007, Soares accused the government of withholding rice supplies and giving them to Fretilin supporters, a claim that Deputy Prime Minister Estanislau da Silva called "irresponsible."

During the April–June 2006 crisis in Timor-Leste, interior minister Rogério Lobato accused some clergy of supporting the "petitioners group"—defecting Timor-Leste Defence Force (F-FDTL) soldiers and their supporters, who were protesting in Dili. Soares responded that "the church is everywhere to attend to the cries and suffering of the people" and that the church was providing counsel to the petitioners to help resolve the crisis peacefully. Soares' home in Dili was set on fire at the height the crisis in May 2006. In March 2007, in the aftermath of the Battle of Same, a failed attempt by Australian forces to apprehend rebel leader and F-FDTL defector Alfredo Reinado, the government considered using Soares as a mediator. At a meeting on 9 March 2007 between Australian diplomats and East Timorese political leaders, the speaker of parliament, Francisco Guterres suggested that Soares, who was known to be sympathetic to Reinado, could talk to the rebel leader on behalf of the government to negotiate his surrender.

In 2008, Soares went to Macau, where he worked at the Cathedral of the Nativity of Our Lady while studying for his master's degree in religious sciences, and later his doctorate, at the University of Saint Joseph. In 2010, he helped to reactivate Grupo Macau Rai Timor, an East Timorese association in Macau, which was established by another East Timorese priest in 1996. In 2013, he was appointed vicar of the Diocese of Macau's ministry for Portuguese-speaking Catholics. In February 2015, he returned to Timor-Leste, having been called to serve as vicar general of the Diocese of Dili by Bishop Alberto da Silva. He returned to Macau in 2016 to complete his doctorate in Christian studies, with a dissertation titled The Diocese of Macau at the dawn of the Diocese of Dili (Portuguese: A Diocese de Macau no alvorecer da Diocese de Dili). In July 2017, he left Macau and returned to Timor-Leste. After his departure, he remained involved with a support group for East Timorese Catholic seminarians studying in Macau.

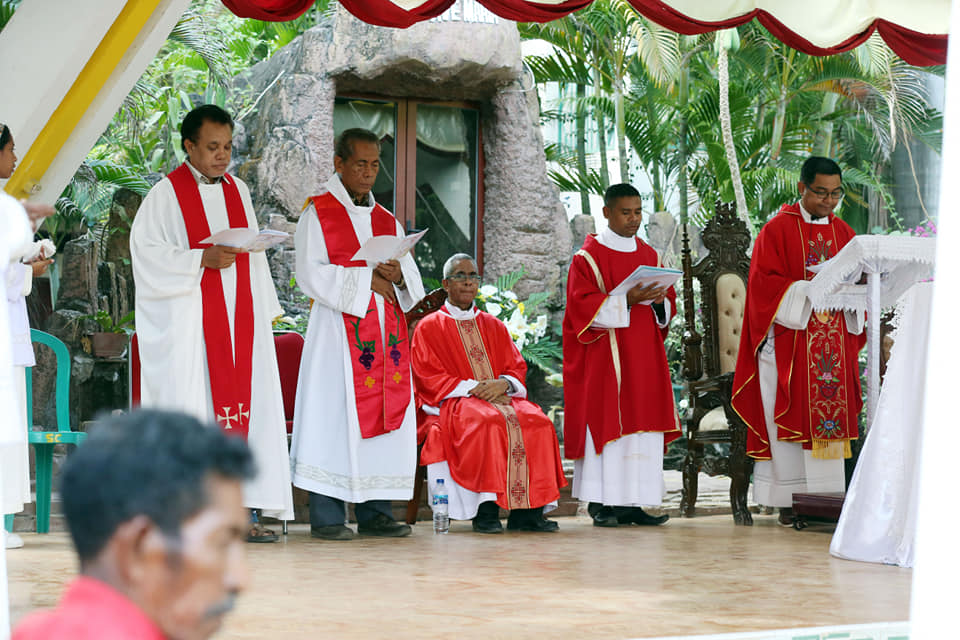
Soares (seated) in 2022 at Sagrado Coração de Jesus church in Becora, Dili

In 2018, Soares was assigned to serve at the Sagrado Coração de Jesus parish in Becora, Dili, where he remained until his death. In 2020, after fighting broke out between deputies in the National Parliament, he visited parliament and openly criticized the nation's lawmakers, saying, "[The deputies] should not behave as if they are in a cockfighting arena... I demand the leaders of this country solve national problems wisely." His remarks resonated among East Timorese social media users. Soares served as director of the Conferência Episcopal Timorense's Citizenship Education Program ahead of the 2022 presidential election. On 18 May 2023, Soares was awarded the Grand Collar of the Order of Timor-Leste in recognition of "his dedication to the national cause, and for his exemplary life testimony." Soares received his decoration the following day in a ceremony at the Palácio de Lahane in Dili.

== Illness and death ==
On 8 May 2025, Soares entered the intensive care unit (ICU) at Guido Valadares National Hospital (HNGV) in Dili, where he was placed on a ventilator and began receiving palliative care. Suffering from multiple illnesses, his condition was described as "very critical." Previously, Soares had been transferred to Malaysia for medical treatment on four occasions, and once to Indonesia in 2022. After his last visit to Malaysia, he was transferred back to Timor-Leste for palliative care. On 10 May, President José Ramos-Horta visited Soares at the hospital, calling the priest a "true hero" and remarking that it was "too early for him to leave this land." The following day, Prime Minister Xanana Gusmão also visited Soares. On 13 May, Archbishop of Dili Cardinal Virgílio do Carmo da Silva visited Soares and blessed him.

Soares died shortly after 7 a.m. on 16 May 2025, at the national hospital ICU, four days after his 73rd birthday. A lung infection was cited as his cause of death. Following his death, Catholics from around Dili began arriving at the hospital to mourn and pray. Later that morning, a requiem mass was celebrated at the hospital chapel, after which Soares' body was flown by helicopter to his home village in Letefoho for viewing by his family and the local community. The following day, his body was returned to Dili and brought to Becora parish in Dili, accompanied by a procession of police, military, family, and parishioners.

Soares' funeral mass was held on the morning of 19 May 2025 at Immaculate Conception Cathedral in Dili. Tens of thousands of Catholics attended, along with political, military, and religious figures including President José Ramos-Horta, Prime Minister Xanana Gusmão, President of the National Parliament Maria Fernanda Lay, and President of the Court of Appeal Afonso Carmona. The bishops of Timor-Leste's three Catholic dioceses, Cardinal da Silva of Dili, Bishop Leandro Maria Alves of Baucau, and Bishop Norberto do Amaral of Maliana, presided over the mass. At the mass, Soares was posthumously awarded the Order of Nicolau Lobato, a distinction awarded to veterans of Timor-Leste's national liberation struggle. Following the funeral, Soares was taken for burial at the Catholic priests' cemetery in Ailok-Laran, Dili, accompanied by a procession of Catholic clergy and faithful, as well as political figures. President Ramos-Horta praised Soares' contributions to Timor-Leste's independence struggle at the official ceremony celebrating the 23rd anniversary of the country's restoration of independence on 20 May 2025, saying, "Today, we commemorate [Soares'] memory, we renew our commitment to the values for which he lived and fought."

== Legacy ==
Soares is regarded in Timor-Leste as a hero of the country's independence struggle and was widely respected for his outspoken activism on behalf of the poor. Often called a "people's priest", and a "father of the nation", he was known for demanding accountability and effectiveness from the government in its service to the people. He was also remembered for his focus on young people, both during the East Timorese struggle for self-determination and after independence.

After his death, many political and religious figures offered paid tribute to Soares. At Soares' funeral mass, the archbishop of Dili, Cardinal Virgílio do Carmo da Silva, described Soares as a "father of the nation and the church in Timor." President José Ramos-Horta recalled his "discreet but close friendship" with Soares, who he described as "a priest who indelibly marked the path of our people." Former prime minister Mari Alkatiri, whose government was the subject of strong criticism by Soares during the 2006 crisis and after, remembered the priest as a "patriot and freedom fighter" who "gave his whole self to the struggle for this country's independence." Former president and Fretilin leader Francisco Guterres remarked that "Timor-Leste has lost a good shepherd and a tireless, intelligent, and courageous freedom fighter." The National Congress for Timorese Reconstruction (CNRT) party's parliamentary leader, Duarte Nunes, a former schoolmate of Soares', remembered the priest's "great contributions" to Timor-Leste's liberation struggle in the diplomatic sphere. Democratic Party leader Manuel Henrique Noronha likewise described Soares as "a figure who contributed greatly, and who after independence continued to use his voice in observation of the development of our country."
