= Jaime Garcia Goulart =

Portuguese Catholic prelate and missionary

- Bishop of Dili
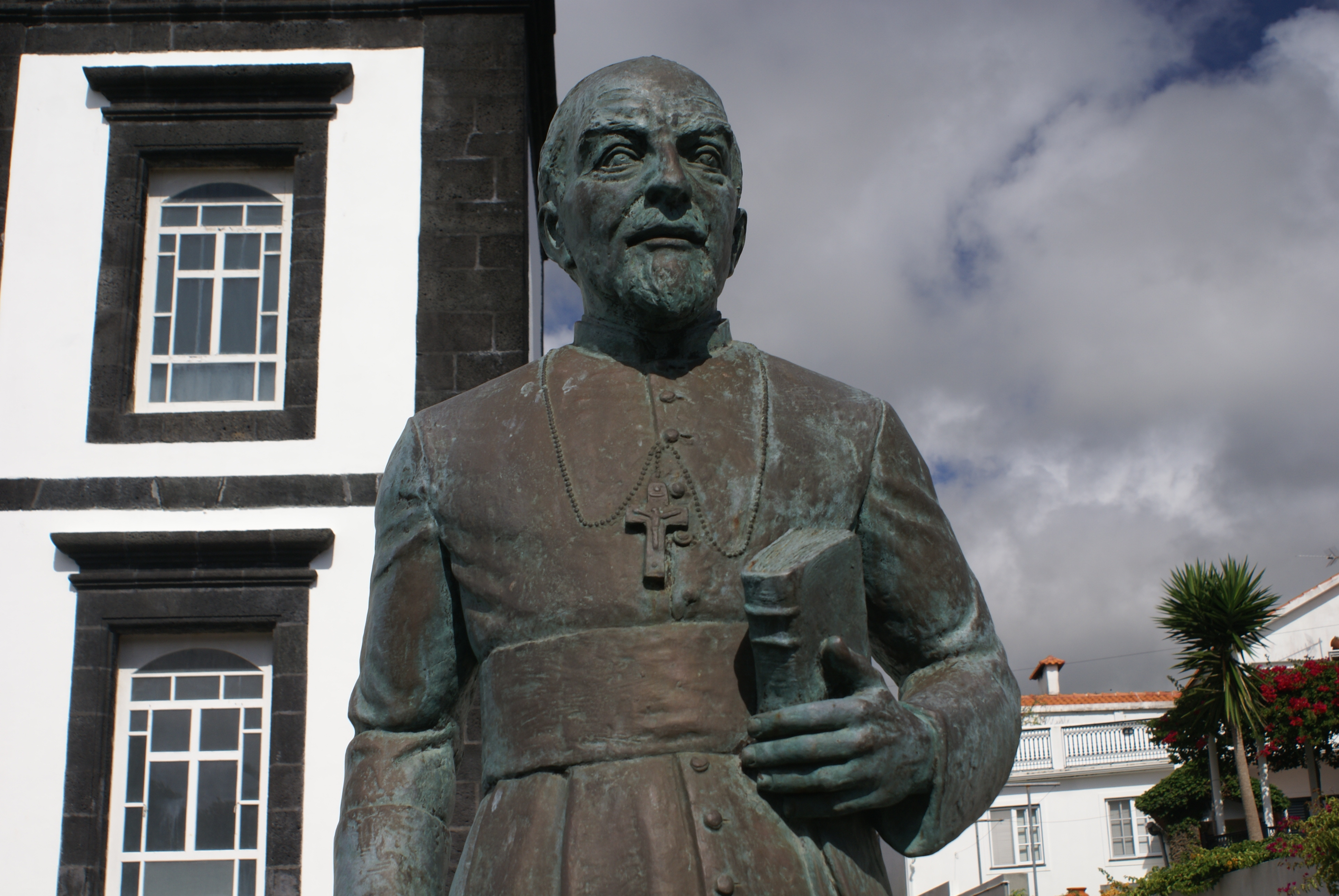
- Bust of Goulart in his hometown of Candelária on Pico Island in the Azores
- Church: Catholic Church
- Province: Goa and Daman
- Diocese: Dili
- Appointed: 12 October 1945
- Installed: 28 October 1945
- Term ended: 31 January 1967
- Predecessor: Diocese established
- Successor: José Joaquim Ribeiro
- Previous post(s): Apostolic Administrator of Dili (1941–1945)

Orders
- Ordination: 10 May 1931
- Consecration: 28 October 1945 by Giovanni Panico

Personal details
- Born: 10 January 1908; Candelária, Pico, Azores, Portugal
- Died: 15 April 1997 (aged 89); Ponta Delgada, São Miguel, Azores, Portugal
- Education: St. Joseph's Seminary; Seminário Episcopal de Angra

Jaime Garcia Goulart (10 January 1908 – 15 April 1997) was a Portuguese Catholic prelate and missionary in Portuguese Timor who served as the first bishop of the Diocese of Dili from 1945 to 1967. Born on the island of Pico in the Azores, he entered the seminary at age 13 and was ordained a priest in 1931. Between 1932 and 1940, he served as a missionary in the Portuguese colonies of Macau and Timor.

In 1941, Goulart was named apostolic administrator of the newly-created Diocese of Dili. During World War II, Goulart faced persecution by the Japanese occupying forces, prompting him to escape to Australia in 1942. Following the end of the war in 1945, he was appointed bishop of Dili and returned to Portuguese Timor. During his 20+ year tenure as bishop, Goulart oversaw a five-fold growth in the colony's Catholic population, from 30,000 (6.4% of the population) to nearly 150,000 (around a quarter). He also led the expansion of the church's education system, and gave particular attention to the training of seminarians.

Citing poor health, Goulart retired in 1967 and returned to the Azores, where for a time he oversaw a children's foundation in his hometown. He died in 1997 at the age of 89, and is buried in Ponta Delgada on the island of São Miguel

== Early life and education ==
Goulart was born on 10 January 1908 in Candelária on the island of Pico in the Azores, the son of Maria Felizarda and João Garcia Goulart. He was related on both his father's and mother's side of Cardinal José da Costa Nunes, the Bishop of Macau; his paternal grandmother, Isabel Emília da Costa, was the cardinal's paternal aunt, and his maternal grandmother, Isabel Felizarda de Castro, was the cardinal's maternal aunt. Inspired by Nunes' example, on 22 July 1921, at age 13, he left the Azores for Macau with 11 other boys to study for the priesthood. He arrived in Macau on 21 September 1921 and entered St. Joseph's Seminary. In 1929, during his third year of theological studies, he was appointed personal secretary to Cardinal Nunes. In 1930–1931, he returned to the Azores to complete his studies at the Seminário Episcopal de Angra in Angra do Heroísmo, where he was ordained a priest on 10 May 1931. He celebrated his first mass on 15 May 1931 at his home parish of Nossa Senhora das Candeias in Candelária.

== Priesthood ==
=== Missionary in Macau and Timor ===
On 13 February 1932, Goulart was sent as a missionary to the Portuguese colonies in Asia. He first returned to Macau, where he resumed his role as secretary to Cardinal Nunes. He also taught Latin and moral education at a girls' secondary school run by the Franciscan Missionaries of Mary, and for a period served as a professor at St. Joseph's Seminary. In 1933, he accompanied Nunes on a visit to Portuguese Timor, where the superior of the Catholic mission at Soibada asked the cardinal to leave Goulart with him. Cardinal Nunes accepted the request, and Goulart stayed in Soibada as a schoolteacher, later becoming the mission's superior. There, on 13 October 1936, he founded Our Lady of Fatima Minor Seminary.

On 8 September 1937, he returned to Macau, where he once again resumed his role as the bishop's secretary, and also taught at the Colégio de Santa Rosa de Lima secondary school. In December 1938, he accompanied Cardinal Nunes on a visit to Europe, during which he carried out research in Goa and Lisbon into the history of the Catholic missions in Timor. He also visited his family in Candelária for the first time since leaving to become a missionary. In April 1940, Goulart left Macau to return to Timor, having been appointed on 22 January 1940 as vicar general of all the Catholic missions in the colony. Later that year, on 4 September 1940, Pope Pius XII created the Diocese of Dili with the bull Sollemnibus Conventionibus, and on 18 January 1941, Goulart was named apostolic administrator of the new diocese. During this period, Portuguese Timor was home to more than 30,000 indigenous Catholics, with over 1,000 new converts each year. The diocese had 22 secular priests, 22 religious sisters, 30 indigenous seminarians, 27 schools for boys and 18 for girls, spread across nine central missions containing 44 smaller mission stations.

=== World War II ===
With the onset of the Pacific War during World War II, the situation in Timor became dangerous, first with the arrival of Dutch and Australian forces in December 1941, and then with the invasion and occupation of Portuguese Timor by Japan starting in February 1942. Around a month after their arrival in Timor, Japanese troops went to Goulart's principal mission in Lahane, on the outskirts of Dili. They surrounded the complex and ransacked its buildings, but found nothing incriminating. Thereafter, Goulart and the other missionaries continued their regular activities, nominally free but under the watch and frequent questioning of the Japanese. During the Japanese occupation, Goulart and other Portuguese missionaries were in contact with Australian soldiers who had remained in Timor, some of whom were Catholic and would come out of hiding to receive the sacraments of penance and the eucharist. The priests often shared food, coffee, and cigarettes with both Australian and Japanese servicemen. On several occasions, missionaries refused to divulge the whereabouts of Australian soldiers to the Japanese, at great personal risk.

In May 1942, the Allied forces began bombing Dili and the city was evacuated, with Goulart relocating his mission headquarters to Ossu. In August 1942, Goulart was beaten by Japanese soldiers after they discovered he had lent his car to rescue a wounded Royal Australian Air Force airman who had crashed in the mountains. In September 1942, Goulart and other priests were arrested and questioned by Japanese officers about their contact with Australian servicemen on the island. Goulart admitted to being in contact with Australians, giving the reason that some were Catholic and needed spiritual care. The questioning officer began choking the priest before a superior intervened. Sometime after, Goulart moved from Ossu to Soibada, and sent for other clergy to join him there.

When word spread of a Japanese order to their local Timorese allies to kill the remaining Europeans in Timor, Goulart tracked down the Australian commanding officer, Bernard Callinan, at his mountain hideout in Alas, to ask for help for himself and his fellow missionaries. Callinan offered to help them evacuate to Australia via sea from Betano on Timor's south coast. After contacting other priests and nuns to join them, the group set out on a multi-day journey to Betano. There, at midnight on 15 December 1942, Goulart and 20 other missionaries, along with a group of Portuguese civilians, boarded a Dutch destroyer, arriving in Darwin, Australia, the following day. After arriving in Australia, the missionaries initially lived in an internment camp at Bobs Farm in New South Wales. Goulart later moved to a Redemptorist monastery in Pennant Hills, Sydney, where he remained until the end of the war.

== Bishop of Dili ==
Following the end of the war, on 12 October 1945, Goulart was appointed as the first bishop of Dili. His episcopal consecration was held on 28 October of the same year in the chapel of St Patrick's Seminary in Manly, Sydney. The Holy See's Apostolic Delegate to Australia and New Zealand, Cardinal Giovanni Panico, was Goulart's principal consecrator, with Archbishop of Sydney Norman Gilroy and Bishop of Armidale John Coleman serving as co-consecrators. Goulart left Australia for Timor on 28 November 1945 on the Angola, a ship carrying more than 400 Portuguese civilians and other returnees, including 10 priests and 20 Canossian sisters. He arrived in Dili on 9 December 1945 to find a city and diocese devastated by war. Most of the church's buildings, including the Dili cathedral, were in ruins as a result of bombing campaigns and the Japanese occupation.

Goulart served as bishop of Dili from 1945 until 1967. During his episcopacy, he saw the Catholic population of Portuguese Timor increase from just under 30,000 (6.4% of the population) to nearly 150,000 (a quarter of the population). During the same period, the number of students in mission schools grew from 1,500 to 8,000. Goulart gave particular focus to the education and training of seminarians. In 1952, Goulart was awarded the Military Order of Christ with the rank of commander by the Portuguese government in recognition of his work in Portuguese Timor. He was also honored with the rank of officer of the Order of Prince Henry on 23 May 1964. Between 1962 and 1964, Goulart participated as a Council Father in the first three sessions of the Second Vatican Council.

In 1965, citing health reasons, Goulart asked the Holy See to name a coadjutor bishop with the right of succession. On 20 July 1965, José Joaquim Ribeiro was appointed to this position, arriving in Dili on 16 February 1966. On 28 December 1966, Goulart announced that he had asked Pope Paul VI two months earlier to accept his resignation due to "my precarious state of health and fatigue". Goulart officially resigned on 31 January 1967, and was replaced by Ribeiro as bishop of Dili. He was then appointed titular bishop of Trofimiana until he relinquished the office on 27 January 1971, after which he used the title bishop emeritus of Dili. When Goulart left Portuguese Timor on 28 February 1967, thousands of people lined the road leading to the Dili airport and the sides of its runway.

== Later life, death, and legacy ==
In August 1967, Goulart returned to the Azores, initially settling in Horta on the island of Faial. He later moved to his hometown, Candelária, on Pico island, where he directed the Casa de São José children's foundation. In the final years of his life, he lived with relatives in Rabo de Peixe and Ponta Delgada on the island of São Miguel. On 3 November 1985, he served as a co-celebrant at the blessing ceremony of the restored Cathedral of Angra do Heroísmo, which had been damaged five years earlier in an earthquake.

Goulart died on 15 April 1997, aged 89, at the Bom Jesus clinic in Ponta Delgada, where he had been hospitalized since March 8th of that year. His funeral mass was held at the parish church in Ponta Delgada, with Bishop of Angra António de Sousa Braga as the celebrant. Goulart is buried at the São Joaquim cemetery in Ponta Delgada.

The Diocese of Angra and Goulart's childhood parish, Nossa Senhora das Candeias in Candelária, planned several celebrations to mark the 100th anniversary of Goulart's birth on 10 January 2008. Bishop Carlos Filipe Ximenes Belo, bishop emeritus of Dili and 1996 Nobel Peace Prize winner, joined the festivities as the guest of honor. In Candelária, Belo unveiled a plaque for the renamed "Rua D. Jaime Garcia Goulart", the road where Goulart's childhood home is located. Next, Belo and Goulart's two nephews laid a wreath of flowers by the bust of Goulart in front of the Candelária parish church, followed by a mass celebrated by Belo, Bishop Emeritus of Macau Arquimínio Rodrigues da Costa, and priests from Faial and Pico. The mass was followed by folk music performance and lecture by Bishop Belo about Goulart's missionary work in Timor. During the celebrations, a message from the Timorese bishops—Alberto Ricardo da Silva of Dili and Basílio do Nascimento of Baucau—was read, which praised Goulart's contributions to the church in Timor-Leste and requested that the bishop's remains be brought to Timor-Leste as a permanent resting place.

Goulart has been described as "one of the greatest Azorean figures of all time." As bishop of Dili for more than two decades, Goulart oversaw significant growth in the diocese's Catholic population and education system. The Our Lady of Fatima Minor Seminary, which Goulart founded in 1936, was for decades the country's only minor seminary, and educated many of Timor-Leste's independence leaders. When he retired in 1967, Goulart described the seminary as his most cherished contribution as bishop of Dili. In 2013, the Instituto Superior de Filosofia e Teologia D. Jaime Garcia Goulart (ISFIT), an institution of advanced philosophical and theological study in Dili, was established as an offshoot of the St. Peter and St. Paul Major Seminary. In 2016, a documentary film, Ida Nebe Fa'an Pulsa (English: The Pulsa Seller), was released, which follows a young Timorese man who "seeks the seeds left by [Goulart] in a young nation devastated by occupations and wars for... independence."

== See also ==
- Catholic Church in Timor-Leste
