= Sacred Heart Cathedral, Maliana =

Sacred Heart Cathedral
- Catedral do Sagrado Coração de Maliana
- Sacred Heart Cathedral
- Location: Maliana
- Country: East Timor
- Denomination: Roman Catholic Church

Administration
- Diocese: Roman Catholic Diocese of Maliana

Clergy
- Bishop: Norberto Do Amaral

The Sacred Heart Cathedral (Portuguese: Catedral do Sagrado Coração de Maliana) or simply Cathedral of Maliana and more formally Cathedral of the Sacred Heart of Jesus, is a religious building affiliated with the Catholic Church which is located in the East Timor town of Maliana in Bobonaro district, near the border with Indonesia. The Cathedral follows the Roman or Latin rite and serves as the seat of the diocese of Maliana (Dioecesis Malianensis or Diocese de Maliana) which was created in 2010 by bull "Missionalem Ecclesiae" of the Pope Benedict XVI. It is under the pastoral responsibility of the Bishop Norberto Do Amaral.

== History ==
Sacred Heart Cathedral was originally the parish church of the parish of Maliana and originally under the episcopal oversight of the Diocese of Dili. It was built between 1972 and 1973 by Father Santa Pereira when East Timor was still a part of Indonesia. In 2010, following the establishment of the new diocese of Malinana by Pope Benedict XVI, it was decided that Sacred Heart Church would be the seat of the new see and was thus elevated to the status of a cathedral. The inauguration was attended by the Apostolic Nuncio to East Timor and the Vice-Prime Minister of East Timor as it became the newest Catholic cathedral.

In 2025, Sacred Heart Cathedral hosted a mass to celebrate the visit of the World Youth Cross ahead of the 2027 World Youth Day in Seoul, South Korea. By the 2010s, it was deemed that a new cathedral was needed. Plans were drawn up for a new one as early as 2013. Funding from the government of East Timor had already been granted for construction of a new episcopal palace. Construction of a new cathedral was an election promise of Prime Ministerial candidate Kay Rala.

== See also ==
- Roman Catholicism in East Timor
- Sacred Heart Cathedral (disambiguation)
