= Hospitaller (disambiguation) =

Hospitaller may refer to:

- Knights Hospitaller, a Catholic military order
- Brothers Hospitallers of Saint John of God, a Catholic religious order
- Franciscan Hospitaller Sisters of the Immaculate Conception, a Catholic religious institute
- Hospitallers Medical Battalion, a Ukrainian volunteer medical battalion

== See also ==
- Health professional
- Julian the Hospitaller
