= Fatubessi =

Fatubessi may refer to:

- Fatubessi, Ainaro, one of the Sucos of East Timor in Maubisse, district Ainaro
- Fatubessi, Ermera, suco in Hatulia, district Ermera, East Timor
