= Maria Clara of the Child Jesus =

Portuguese religious sister

Blessed Maria Clara of the Child Jesus
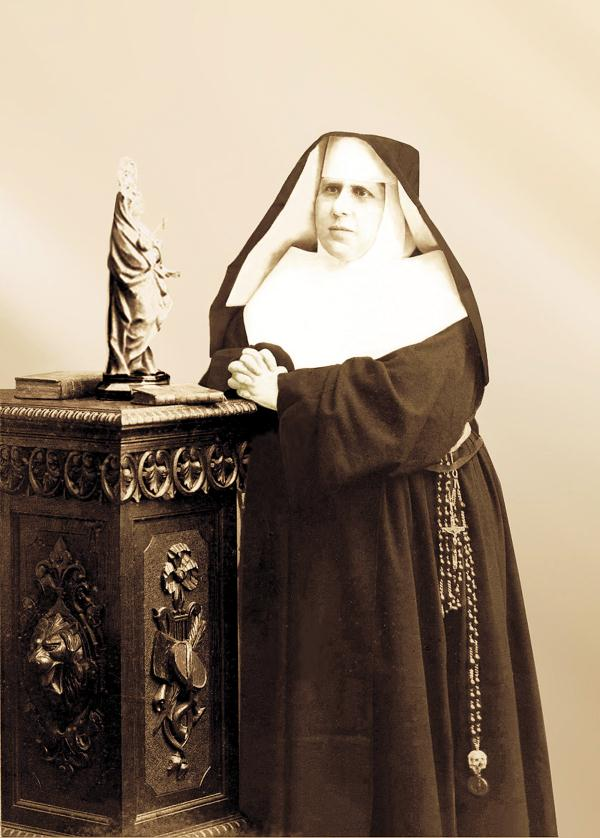

Virgin
- Born: Libânia do Carmo Galvão Mexia de Moura Telles de Albuquerque; 15 June 1843; Amadora, Lisbon, Portugal
- Died: 1 December 1899 (aged 56); Lisbon, Portugal
- Venerated in: Roman Catholic Church
- Beatified: 21 May 2011, Estádio do Restelo, Lisbon, Portugal by Cardinal Angelo Amato
- Feast: 1 December

Maria Clara of the Child Jesus (15 June 1843 – 1 December 1899) — born Libânia do Carmo Galvão Mexia de Moura Telles de Albuquerque was a Portuguese religious sister in the Roman Catholic Church who established the Franciscan Hospitaller Sisters of the Immaculate Conception in Lisbon. She led the congregation as its superior.

Her beatification was celebrated in Lisbon in 2011. Cardinal Angelo Amato presided over the solemn Mass on the behalf of Pope Benedict XVI.

== Life ==
Libânia do Carmo Galvão Mexia de Moura Telles de Albuquerque was born on 15 June 1843 in Lisbon to the nobles Nuno Tomás de Mascarenhas Galvão Mexia de Moura Telles de Albuquerque (25 January 1813 — 3 December 1857) and Maria da Purificação de Sá Carneiro Duarte Ferreira (d. 30 May 1856); her brother was Henrique Galvão Mexia Moura Sousa Telles Albuquerque (b. 15 March 1851). She received her baptism from Father Jerónimo on 2 September 1843 in the parish church of Benfica. Her godmother was Libânia do Carmo de Abranches Ferreira da Cunha.

Her family died when she was a young teenager. Her great-uncle died in her home during her adolescence and her little brother Rui died around that time. Her mother died from cholera on 30 May 1856 and her father followed mere months later in 1857 due to Yellow Fever in Saint Joseph's Hospital. In October 1857 she joined the Royal Asylum of Ajuda (Asilo Real da Ajuda) - in the palace of King Peter V - an orphanage for children of noble families that the Vincentian Sisters managed (until 1882) and remained there in the boarding school until 9 June 1862 when the Marquises of Valada invited her to reside with them. The Marchioness - a friend of her late parents - treated her like her own daughter.

She remained there until 1867 when she sought shelter at the convent of São Patrício. In 1869 she received the habit of the Capuchin order in the convent of São Patrício and assumed the name of "Maria Clara of the Child Jesus". Father Raimundo dos Anjos Beirão supported her entrance into the religious life and suggested that she entered religious life abroad due to the difficult circumstances (profession was forbidden in Portugal due to the anti-religious climate); he also supported her idea to establish a new religious congregation.

On 5 February 1870 she left Portugal for the novitiate in Calais at the Congregation of the Franciscan Hospitallers and Teachers; she commenced it on 10 February. She left for France alongside Sister Maria of Espírito Santo who returned to Portugal with her later. She made her vows on 14 April 1871 and returned to Lisbon on 1 May 1871. She was installed on 3 May 1871 as the superior and novice mistress of the Franciscan Hospitaller Sisters of the Immaculate Conception that she founded; she was recognized as the foundress in a solemn celebration on 3 May 1876. Pope Pius IX provided papal assent to the order on 27 March 1876. On 25 November 1876 she sent a letter to the Holy See to request pontifical approval of her order. Fr. Beirão died on 13 June 1878 which prompted her to guide the order alone and she could not reach the funeral in time due to her visiting the houses of Braga.

She sent the first missionaries to Africa (mainly to Angola) on 7 February 1883 and sent more to India on 24 May 1886. On 23 June 1893 the Holy See appointed the Cardinal Patriarch of Lisbon José Sebastião de Almeida Neto as the apostolic vicar to the order. In 1894 she received approval from the Holy See to open a novitiate in Panjim in the colony of Goa. From 11–14 August 1894 the General Chapter of the order re-elected her as superior general with 45 out of 60 votes. The Holy See recognized her as the order's foundress on 22 May 1896 and as superior general until her death. On 29 May 1896 the Franciscan priest Antonio de Santa Maria was made the new apostolic visitor of the order and in the 2–25 October 1897 General Chapter sought to isolate her with amending the constitution of the order; the General Chapter of 2–6 September 1896 was for researching such amendments though the presiding priest was another appointed as the visitor. The full apostolic visit concluded on 20 December 1898 during which time her powers were suspended though the end of the visit restored her powers as superior.

Her death in the evening of 1 December 1899 came due to cardiac illness coupled with asthma and a coin nodule that resulted in three hours of pain before her death. Her remains were buried on 4 December 1899 (her mortal remains were incorrupt for 55 years) in the Prazeres Cemetery and later transferred in 1954 to the convent of Santo António in Caminha and then in 1998 to the motherhouse of the order in Linda-a-Pastora near Lisbon. Her order became aggregated to the Third Order of Saint Francis.

== Beatification ==
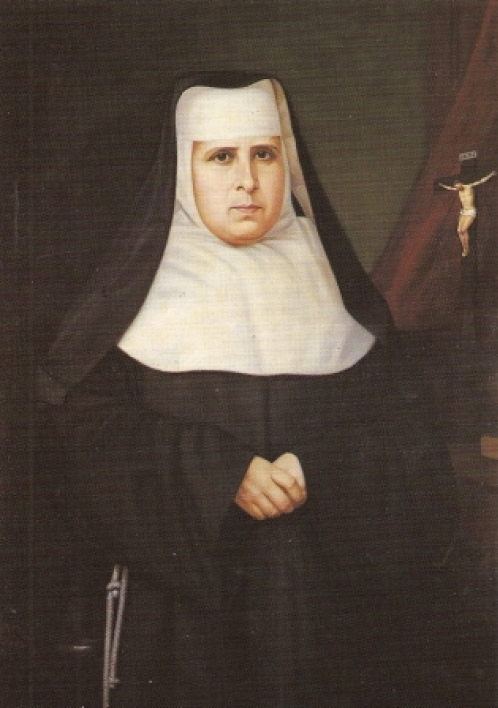
Sister Maria Clara of the Child Jesus

The beatification process commenced under Pope John Paul II on 21 August 1995 in Lisbon after the Congregation for the Causes of Saints titled her as a Servant of God and granted the official "nihil obstat" ('nothing against') to the cause - the diocesan process spanned from 18 December 1995 until its closure on 12 November 1997 in which 21 boxes of documentation was sent to Rome. The C.C.S. validated the process on 6 November 1998 and assumed charge of the boxes.

The postulation submitted the Positio to the C.C.S. in 2003 at which point the C.C.S. transferred the cause to a board of historians on 4 May 2004 so that the latter could deem there were no historical obstacles to it. The consulting theologians voted in favor of the cause on 1 February 2008 while the C.C.S. followed this decision in a meeting on 7 October 2008. She was proclaimed to be Venerable on 6 December 2009 after Pope Benedict XVI approved the fact that she had lived a life of heroic virtue.

The miracle approved for her beatification was the cure of the Spanish woman Mrs. Georgina Troncoso Monteagudo on 12 November 2003. The purported miracle was investigated in Spain in a diocesan process from 24 January 2005 until 23 April 2005 while the C.C.S. approved the process and validated it on 15 February 2008. The medical board approved the miracle on 14 January 2010 while consulting theologians followed suit on 15 June 2010; the C.C.S. also approved it on 7 December 2010.

Benedict XVI approved the miracle on 10 December 2010 and delegated Cardinal Angelo Amato to preside over the beatification on 21 May 2011 in Portugal in which the Cardinal Patriarch of Lisbon José Policarpo was in attendance and presided over the Eucharistic rites.

Her feast day is 1 December.
