= Letefoho Administrative Post =

Administrative post in Ermera Municipality, Timor-Leste

Letefoho
- Administrative Post
- Posto Administrativo de Letefoho (Portuguese); Postu administrativu Letefuó (Tetum)
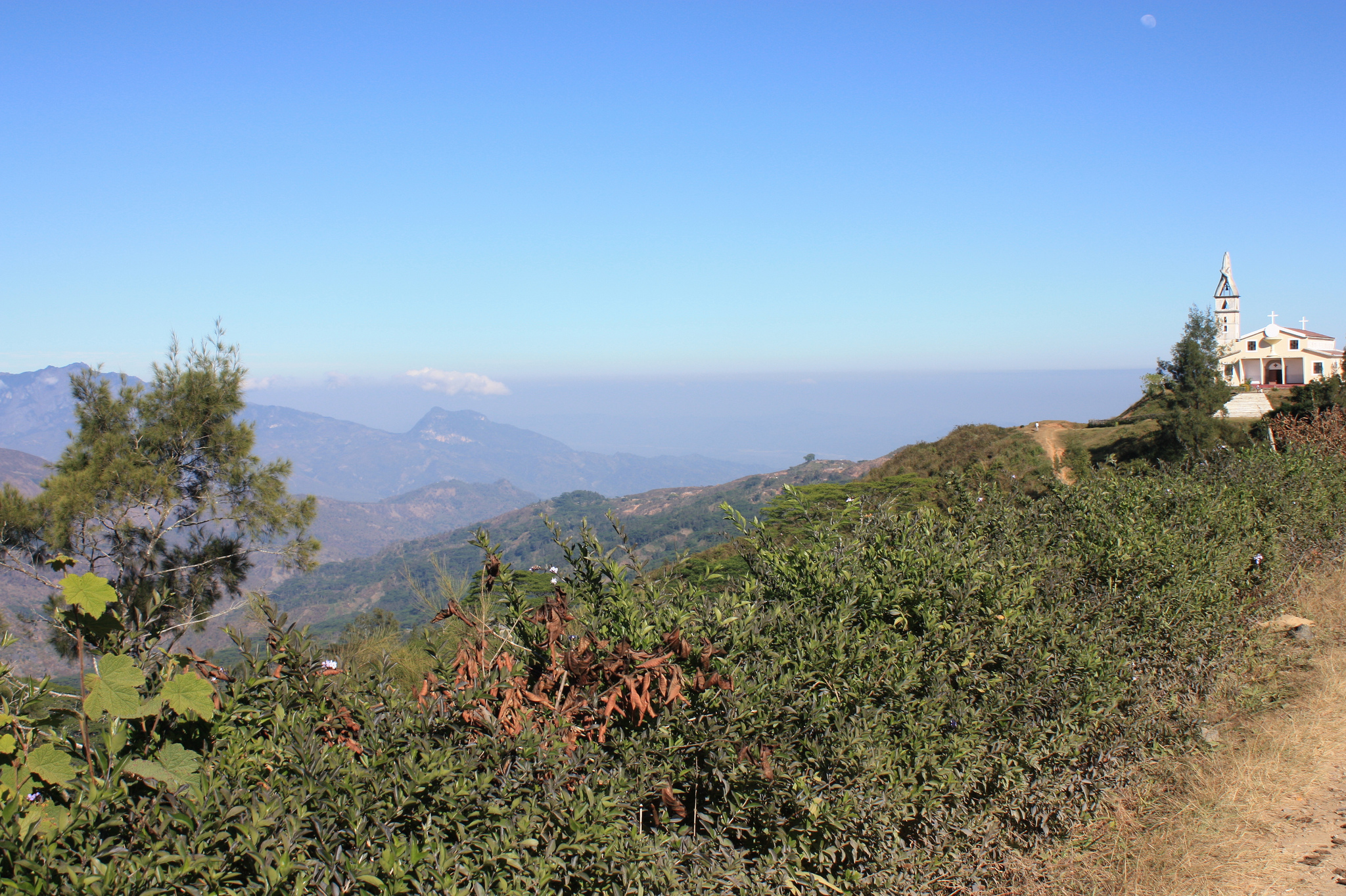
- Letefoho landscape

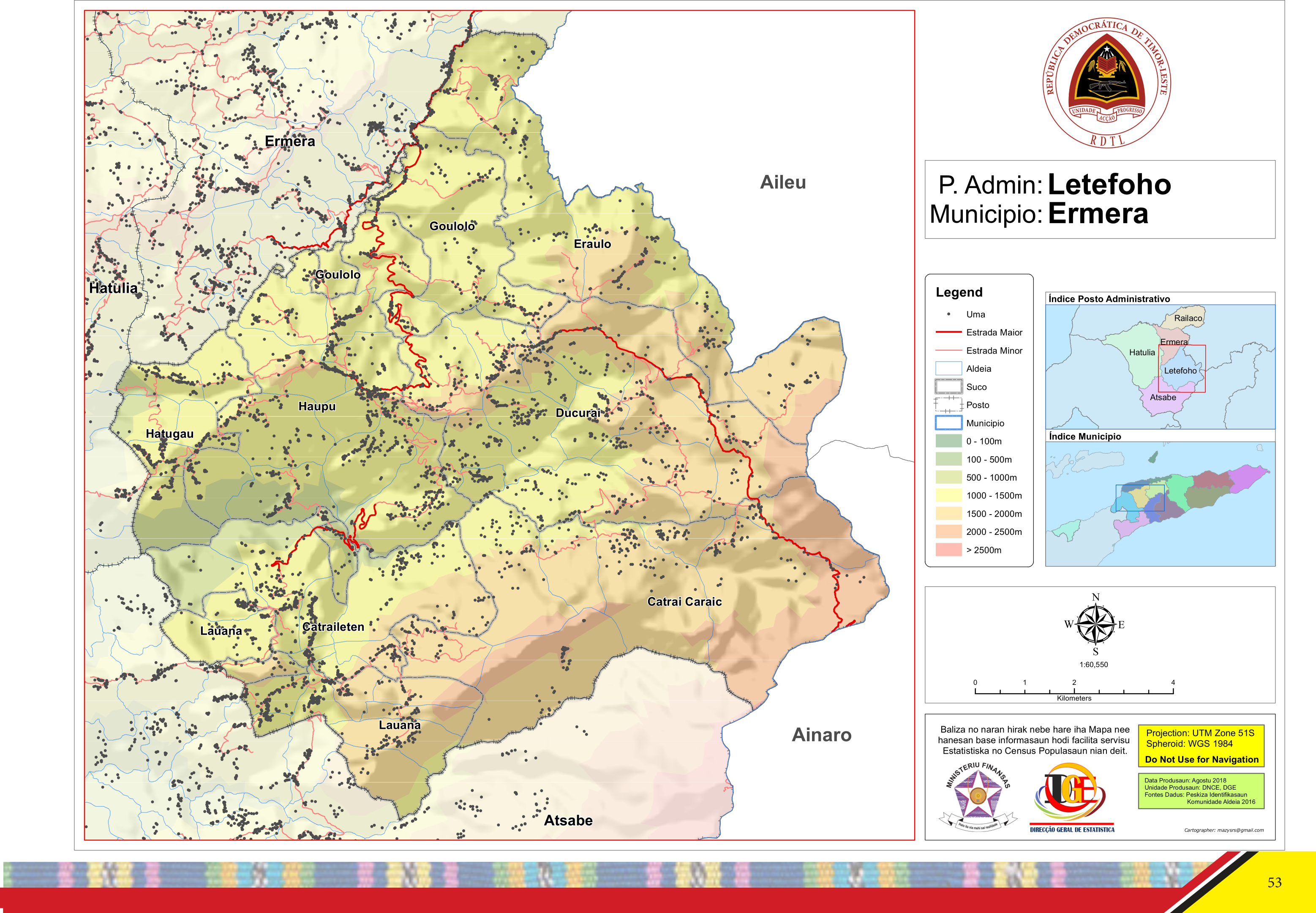
- Official map

- Location within East Timor
- Coordinates: 8°50′S 125°25′E
- Country: Timor-Leste
- Municipality: Ermera
- Seat: Haupu
- Sucos: Catrai Caraic; Catraileten; Ducurai; Eraulo; Goulolo; Hatugau; Haupu; Lauana

Area
  - Total: 133.3 km^{2} (51.5 sq mi)

Population (2015 census)
  - Total: 22,128
  - Density: 166.0/km^{2} (429.9/sq mi)

Households (2015 census)
  - Total: 3,933
- Time zone: UTC+09:00 (TLT)

Letefoho, officially Letefoho Administrative Post (Portuguese: Posto Administrativo de Letefoho, Tetum: Postu administrativu Letefuó), is an administrative post (and was formerly a subdistrict) in Ermera municipality, Timor-Leste. Its seat or administrative centre is Haupu, and its population as of the 2004 census was 19,917.

Letefoho is also known for producing coffee due to its growing condition and altitude. Letefoho coffee is exported to specialty coffee markets.

== Notable people ==
- Domingos Maubere (1952–2025), Catholic priest and activist
