= Diocese of Maliana =

Roman Catholic diocese in East Timor

Diocese of Maliana Dioecesis Malianensis Diocese de Maliana Dioseze Maliana

catholic

Location
- Country: Timor-Leste
- Territory: Bobonaro, Cova Lima, and Liquiçá municipalities
- Metropolitan: Archdiocese of Dili

Statistics
- Area: 3,142 km^{2} (1,213 sq mi)
- Population: Total; Catholics: (as of 2022); ▲297,620; ▲290,850 (▲97.7%)
- Parishes: 11

Information
- Denomination: Catholic Church
- Sui iuris church: Latin Church
- Rite: Roman Rite
- Established: 30 January 2010
- Cathedral: Sacred Heart Cathedral
- Secular priests: 22 (2022)

Current leadership
- Pope: Leo XIV
- Bishop: Norberto do Amaral
- Vicar General: Lucio Norberto de Deus

Map
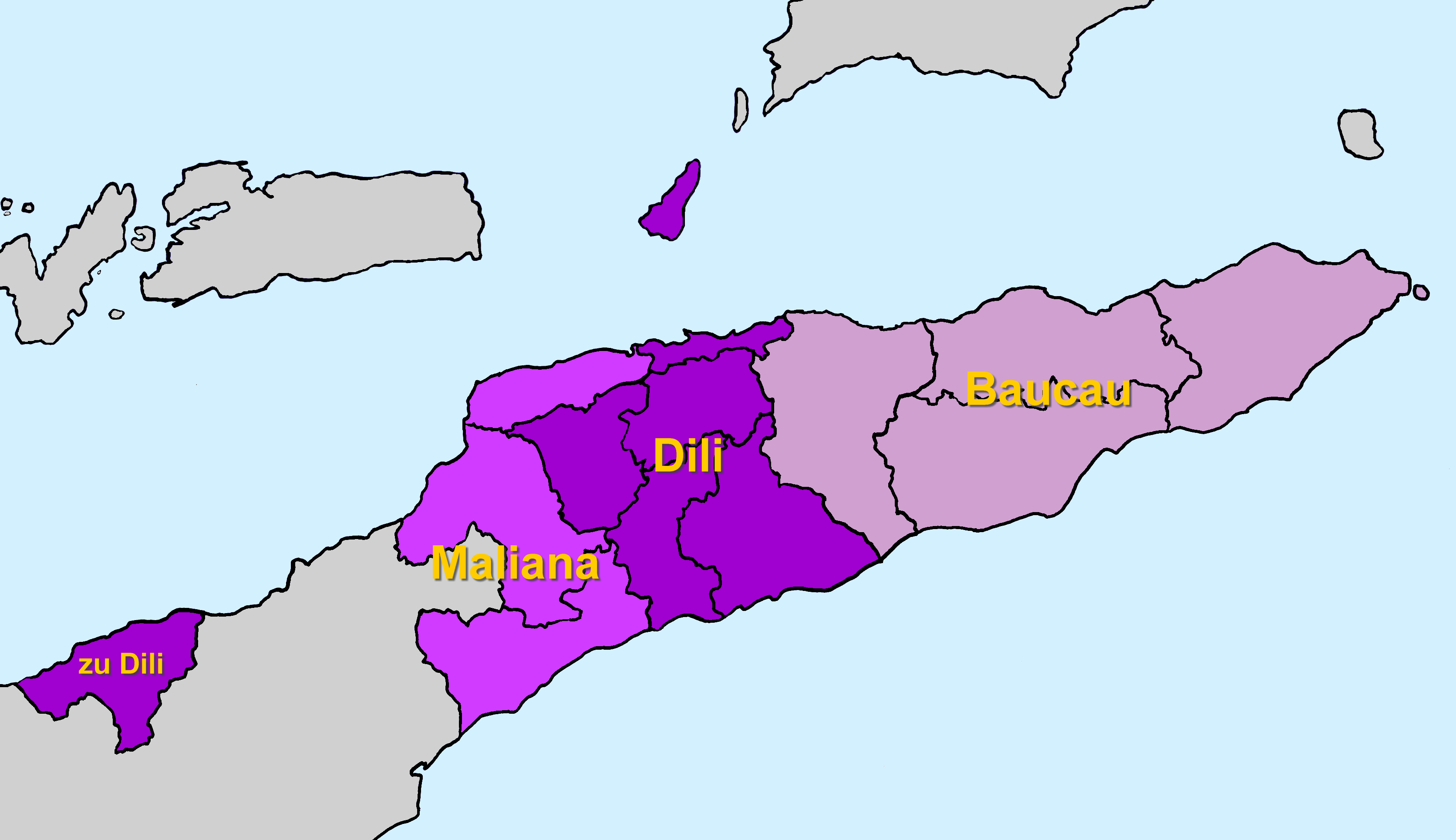
- Location of the diocese within Timor-Leste

The Roman Catholic Diocese of Maliana (Latin: Dioecesis Malianensis; Portuguese: Diocese de Maliana; Tetum: Dioseze Maliana) is a Latin Church diocese of the Catholic Church in Timor-Leste. The newest of the country's three dioceses, it was established in 2010 by Pope Benedict XVI. It serves nearly 300,000 Catholics in the municipalities of Bobonaro, Cova Lima, and Liquiçá, covering a total area of 3,142 km^{2} (1,213 square miles). The current bishop since the diocese's founding is Norberto do Amaral.

The mother church of the diocese is Sacred Heart Cathedral in Maliana. The diocese has 11 parishes and 65 missions, and is served by 50 priests, 73 religious brothers, and 131 religious sisters. It operates a minor seminary, St. Joseph Seminary, and a number of primary and secondary schools.

== History ==
Until the 1990s, the entirety of what is now Timor-Leste comprised one ecclesiastical territory, the Diocese of Dili. In 1996, the Diocese of Baucau was formed. After independence in 2002, the Holy See planned to create a third diocese centered in Same so that Timor-Leste could form its own episcopal conference. However, these plans stalled around 2005 amidst ongoing changes by the government to the country's administrative subdivision boundaries.

The Vatican's plan to create a third diocese in Timor-Leste materialized on 30 January 2010, when Pope Benedict XVI established the Diocese of Maliana, with territory taken from the Diocese of Dili. Norberto do Amaral, chancellor of the Dili diocese, was appointed as Maliana's first bishop. Amaral was consecrated on 24 April 2010 in Tasitolu, Dili, in a ceremony attended by Deputy Prime Minister José Luís Guterres, Supreme Court president Cláudio de Jesus Ximenes, attorney general Ana Pessoa Pinto, and other deputies, politicians, magistrates, diplomats, bishops, as well as thousands of priests, sisters, and laity. Amaral was installed the following day in Maliana.

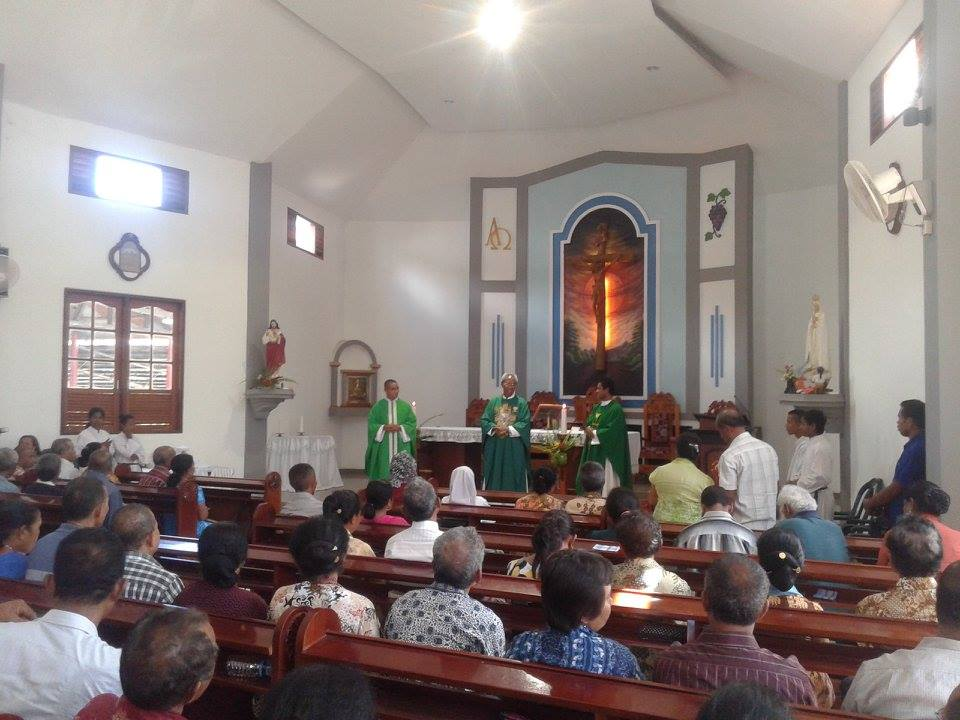
Mass at Holy Cross Church in Maliana, 2016

At the time of its creation, the diocese consisted of just over 200,000 Catholics, representing 98% of the population, and served by 10 parishes, 31 priests (six diocesan and 25 religious), and 108 religious brothers and sisters. The parish church of Maliana became the diocese's new cathedral, and the government provided funding and a building for a temporary residence for the bishop. On 17 February 2019, a new episcopal palace and chancery building were inaugurated in a ceremony attended by bishops Amaral, Virgílio do Carmo da Silva of Dili, Basílio do Nascimento of Baucau, and former President Xanana Gusmão. The new buildings were constructed with public funds provided by the prime minister's office. As of 2022, the diocese has grown to nearly 300,000 Catholics, and now has 11 parishes and 65 missions served by 50 priests and 184 religious brothers and sisters.

== Structure ==
The Diocese of Maliana is a suffragan diocese within the ecclesiastical province of Dili. Along with the bishops of Baucau and Dili, the bishop of Maliana is a member of the Timorese Episcopal Conference. The conference is represented in the Federation of Asian Bishops' Conferences.

=== Territory ===
The diocese covers a total area of 3,142 km^{2} (1,213 square miles). Its territory comprises the western municipalities of Bobonaro, Cova Lima, and Liquiçá. The diocese borders the Archdiocese of Dili to the east and the Diocese of Atambua, located in Indonesian West Timor, to the west. The diocese has a total population of 297,620, of whom 290,850 (97.7%) are Catholic. The remaining few thousand are mostly Muslim, Protestant, or animist.

=== Personnel ===
The diocese is led by its bishop, Norberto do Amaral, who is assisted by vicar general Lucio Norberto de Deus. As of 2022, the diocese has 22 secular priests, with 58 seminarians in formation. Additionally, there are 28 religious priests, 73 religious brothers, and 121 religious sisters living and working in the diocese. In 2021, there were 416 catechists in the diocese.

A number of religious orders and institutes operate in the diocese. For men, these include the Capuchins, Carmelites, Claretians, Divine Word Missionaries, and Jesuits. Female institutes include the Canossians, Carmelites, Daughters of the Queen of the Holy Rosary, Franciscan Hospitaller Sisters, Franciscan Sisters of the Sacred Heart, Holy Spirit Missionary Sisters, Missionary Sisters of the Immaculate Heart of Mary, Religious of Mary Immaculate, Religious of the Virgin Mary, Salesians, Sisters of Mercy, and several others.

=== Parishes ===
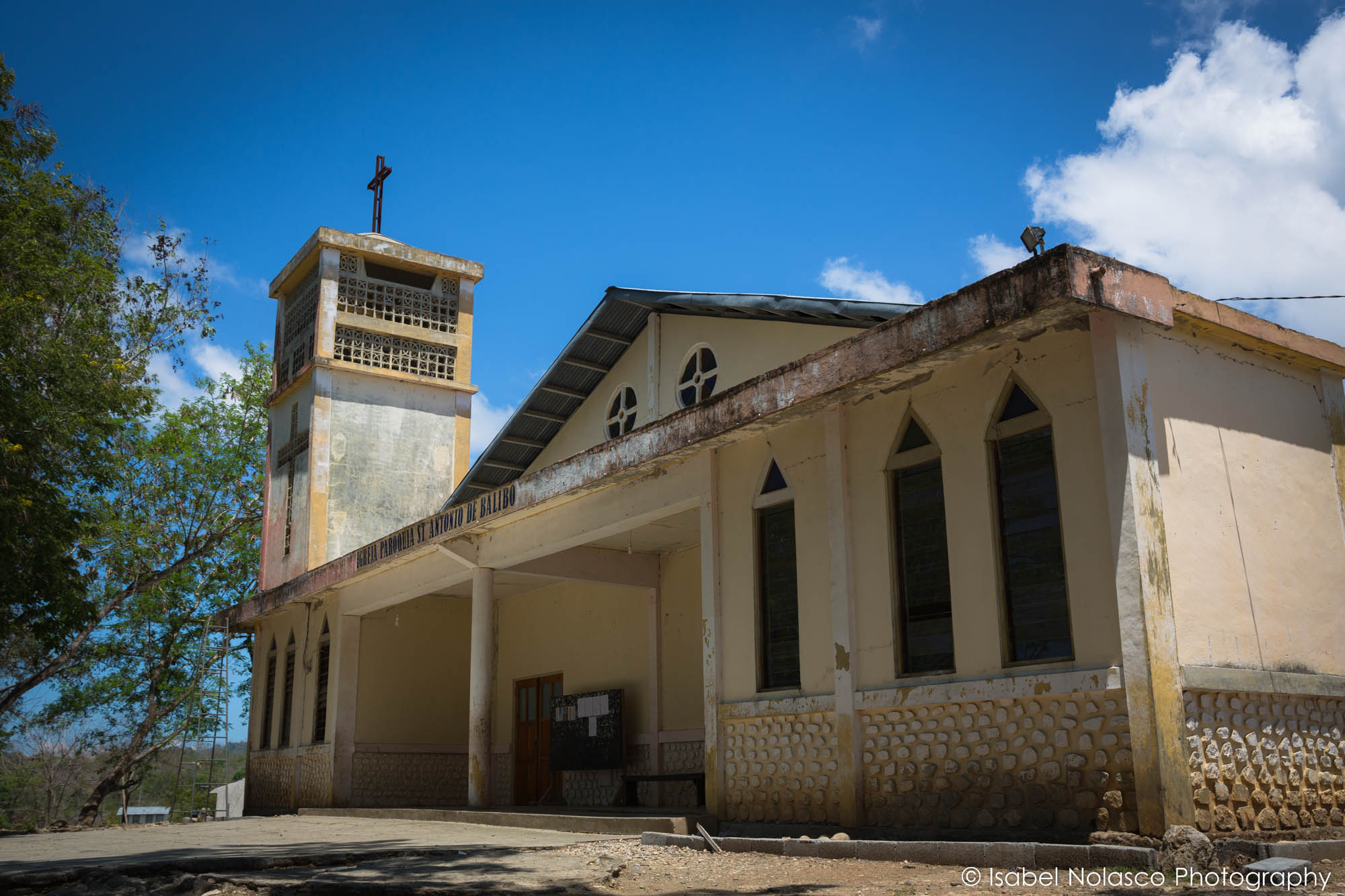
St. Anthony Church in Balibo, 2016

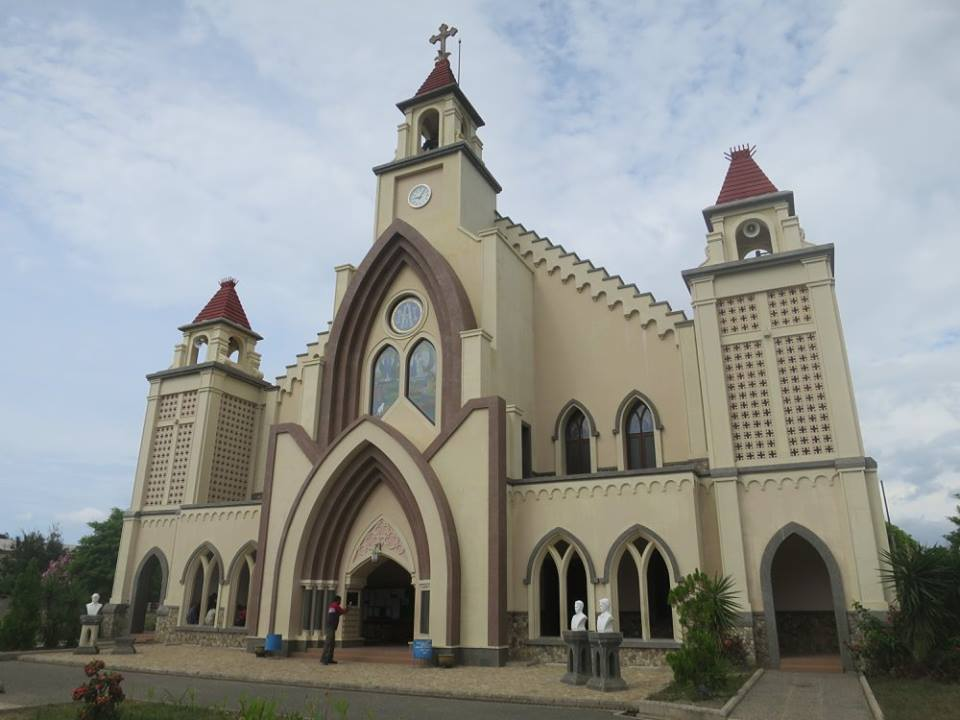
Ave Maria Church in Suai, 2016

The diocese is divided into 11 parishes, with 65 missions.

Parish	Location	Municipality
São Francisco de Assis	Atabae	Bobonaro
Santo António	Balibo	Bobonaro
Nossa Senhora da Imaculada Conceição	Bobonaro	Bobonaro
Nossa Senhora de Fátima	Lolotoe	Bobonaro
Santa Cruz	Maliana	Bobonaro
Sacred Heart of Jesus (cathedral)	Maliana	Bobonaro
Imaculado Coração de Maria	Fohorem	Cova Lima
Santo António Maria Claret	Salele	Cova Lima
Ave Maria	Suai	Cova Lima
Nossa Senhora do Carmo	Zumalai	Cova Lima
São João de Brito	Liquiçá	Liquiçá

== Bishops ==
1. Norberto do Amaral (30 January 2010 – present)

== Education ==
Fundação Sagrado Coração de Jesus (Sacred Heart of Jesus Foundation) oversees all of the Diocese of Maliana's schools. The diocese operates seven preschools with 291 total students, 19 primary schools and eight junior high schools with 6,122 total students, and five senior high schools with a total enrollment of 1,148. The diocese also runs an orphanage. Secondary schools administered by the diocese include Ave Maria in Suai, Infante de Sagres College in Maliana, and São João de Brito in Liquiçá. Other Catholic schools located in the diocese include Cristal Private Secondary School in Maliana, Divine Word College in Palaca, and St. Ignatius of Loyola College in Kasait, founded by the Society of Jesus in 2013. The diocese is also home to Don Bosco Technical School near Maliana, established in 2013 by the Salesians with funding from the Timorese and Spanish governments, which provides vocational training to 100+ boarding students. The diocese contains one Catholic higher education institution, St. John de Britto Institute, a Jesuit teachers' college in Kasait.

On 26 September 2017, the Diocese of Maliana established a minor seminary, St. Joseph Seminary, with an initial enrollment of 22 students located in a renovated diocesan school building. Previously, minor seminarians from the diocese attended Our Lady of Fatima Minor Seminary in Dili, which served the country's three dioceses and which had only 90 spots each year for more than 300 applicants. Major seminarians from the diocese attend the interdiocesan St. Peter and St. Paul Seminary in Dili.

== See also ==
- Catholic Church in Timor-Leste
- List of Catholic dioceses in Timor-Leste
