= Our Lady of Fatima Minor Seminary =

Roman Catholic minor seminary in Dili, Timor-Leste

- Seminário Menor de Nossa Senhora de Fátima
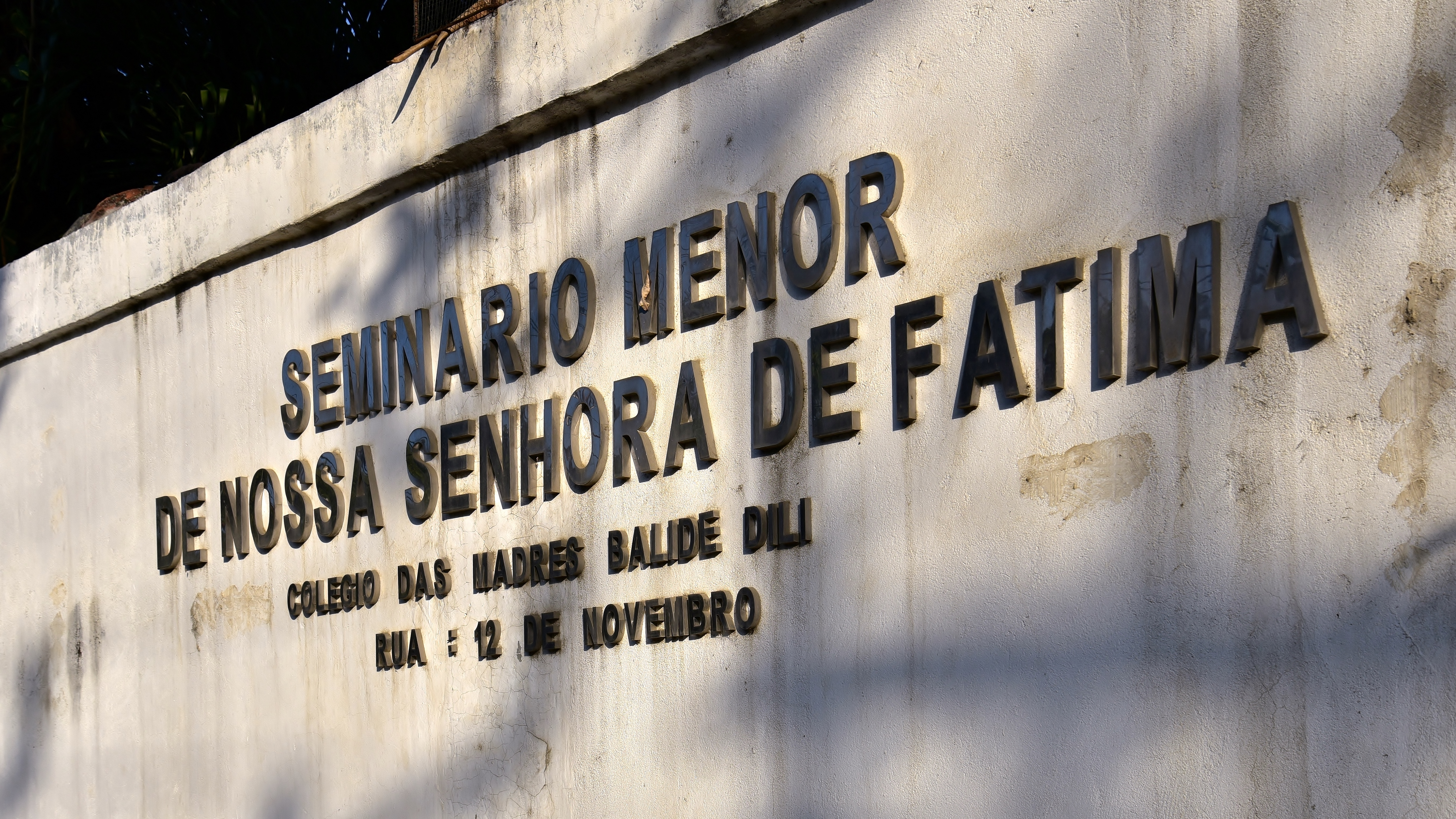
- Type: Minor seminary
- Established: 13 October 1936; 90 years ago
- Religious affiliation: Roman Catholic
- Rector: Natalino da Costa
- Students: 254 (2017)
- Location: Dili, Timor-Leste; 8°33′54″S 125°35′04″E
- Campus: Urban
- Language: Portuguese
- Website: Official website

Our Lady of Fatima Minor Seminary (SENOFA; Portuguese: Seminário Menor de Nossa Senhora de Fátima) is a Roman Catholic minor seminary located in Dili, Timor-Leste. Established in 1936, it is the country's oldest Roman Catholic seminary. Originally located in Soibada, Manatuto, it moved in 1951 to Dare, on the outskirts of Dili. The seminary was canonically registered by the Holy See in 1954. In 1958, the Jesuits took over administration of the seminary. The seminary closed after the 1975 Indonesian invasion of East Timor, reopening three years later in 1978.

== History ==
The seminary, which while at Dare sat on the top ridge of the mountains surrounding Dili, was for generations Timor-Leste's most important educational institute where almost every East Timorese leader was educated. On 13 December 1975, a few days after the start of the Indonesian invasion of East Timor, the seminary building in Dare was bombed. In 1978, Father José Martins and Father João Felgueiras reopened the seminary in Externato de S. José, a building on the outskirts of Dili. In 1983 the St. Joseph's High School became a separate institution from the minor seminary. Among the students of the high school are approximately 50 seminarians.

Until independence the medium of instruction was Indonesian.

In July 2000 the seminary was the venue for the marriage of Timor-Leste President Xanana Gusmão and Kirsty Sword. In 2001 the seminary had about 30 Timorese candidates for the diocesan priesthood. In 2017 the seminary had 254 students. On 1 March 2007 the country's new apostolic nuncio, Archbishop Leopoldo Girelli, celebrated Mass at the Immaculate Conception Cathedral, Dili, before visiting the seminary.

Father Lopes Mouzinho is the rector of the seminary in 2007. The grounds of the seminary were a sanctuary for thousands of refugees. It became one of Dili's many Internally Displaced Persons camps.

The alumni of the seminary, including President Xanana Gusmão, Bishop Alberto Ricardo da Silva of Dili and Bishop Basilio do Nascimento of Baucau, and others met at the seminary on 30 October 2004 to celebrate its 50th anniversary. Jesuit Father Leonardus Dibyawiyata who was the rector of the seminary from 1996 to 1999 also spoke on the occasion. The seminary has produced about 40 priests, including three bishops. Hundreds of politicians and professionals also are graduates of the seminary.

In 2010 the Church in Timor-Leste celebrated the 75th anniversary of the opening of the seminary, where 75 seminarians were preparing for the priesthood.

By 2010, being the country's only minor seminary, it was struggling to accommodate the growing number of candidates desiring to enter the priesthood. This led to the plan to build a second minor seminary. In 2017, the Maliana Diocese became home to the St. Joseph Seminary, Maliana, the country's second minor seminary.

In 2016, Father Angelo Salsinha was rector of the seminary. Speaking at the seminary on 8 March 2016, Msgr. Ionut Paul Strejac, the Vatican's chargé d'affaires in Timor-Leste, spoke to about 400 Timor-Leste youth mostly university and high school students in Dili Diocese about reconciliation, conflict and violence.

== Rectors ==
- Jaime Garcia Goulart (1936–1937)
- Fr. Januario (1937–1942; 1948–1950)
- Jaime Garcia Goulart (1950–1955)
- Porfirio Campos (1955–1958)
- Estanislau Liu, SJ (1958–1961)
- André Dias de Rábago, SJ (1961–1967)
- Albino de Sá, SJ (1967–1970)
- João Felgueiras, SJ (1970–1975)
- José Alves Martins, SJ (1986–1990)
- Karl Albrecht, SJ (1990–1996)
- Leonardus Dibyawiyata, SJ (1996–2000)
- Norberto do Amaral (2000–2004)
- Mouzinho Pereira Lopes (2004–2011)
- Leandro Maria Alves (2011–2014)
- Angelo Salsinha (2014– )

== Notable people ==
=== Faculty ===
- Leandro Maria Alves, bishop of Baucau (2023–present), served as the seminary's rector from (2011–2014)
- Norberto do Amaral, bishop of Maliana (2010–present), served as the seminary's rector from 2000–2004
- Jaime Garcia Goulart, first bishop of Dili (1945–1967), founder of the seminary and its rector from 1936–1937 and 1950–1955

=== Alumni ===
- Francisco Xavier do Amaral, independence leader and first president of Timor-Leste (1975)
- Norberto do Amaral, bishop of Maliana (2010–present)
- Abílio Araújo, independence leader
- Alberto Araújo, priest and independence leader; studied at the seminary 1955–1961
- Crisódio Araújo, poet, writer, and academic
- Carlos Filipe Ximenes Belo, apostolic administrator of the Diocese of Dili (1988–2002), and Nobel Peace Prize winner
- Alberto Carlos, politician and diplomat; studied at the seminary 1974–1975
- António da Conceição, politician
- Francisco Borja da Costa, independence leader, journalist, and poet who wrote "Pátria", the national anthem of Timor-Leste
- José António da Costa, priest and vicar general of the Diocese of Dili (1993–2003)
- Vitor da Costa, independence leader and politician; studied at the seminary 1963–1967
- Nicolau Lobato, independence leader and first prime minister of Timor-Leste (1975)
- Xanana Gusmão, independence leader and politician; former president (2002–2007) and prime minister of Timor-Leste (2007–2015, 2023–present)
- Domingos Maubere, priest, activist, and independence leader; studied at the seminary 1967–1973
- Alberto Ricardo da Silva, bishop of Dili (2004–2015)

== See also ==
- Catholic Church in Timor-Leste
- List of Catholic seminaries
- List of secondary schools in Timor-Leste
