= St Theresina's Church =

Roman Catholic church in Ossu, East Timor

Coordinates: 8.7431°S 126.3852°E

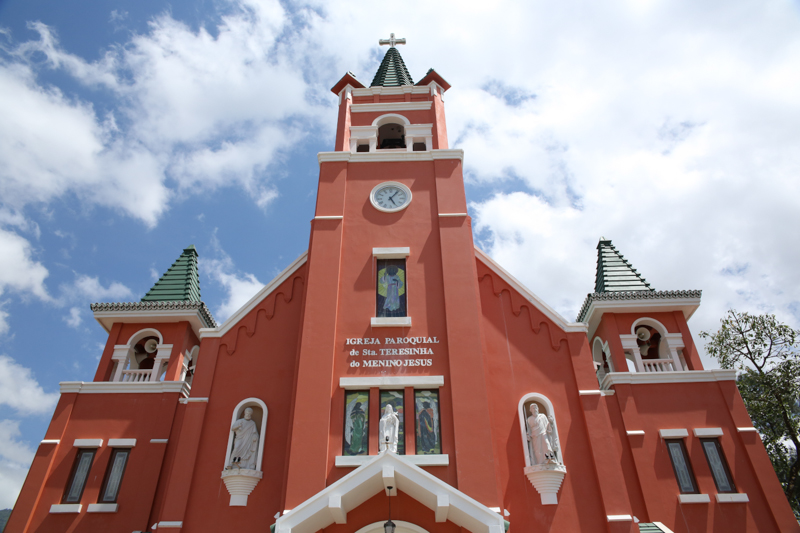
St Theresina's Church in Ossu

St Theresina's Church is a Roman Catholic church in Ossu, East Timor. It is located in the Viqueque Municipality in the Diocese of Baucau. The parish of Ossu is located approximately 150 km from Dili.

The parish facilitates many programs with and for its people: FOSKA – a youth and young adult's formation program, adult prayer groups, ministry for the sick, and care for those suffering from poverty and hunger. Ossu is also home to St Magdalena's College run by the Canossian Sisters.

== History ==
In 2007 Father Tiago Soares da Costa became the Parish Priest and as of 2010 there were approximately 21,000 people living within the parish. The number of people attending Mass on the weekends had grown necessitating a new church building.

Approximately 1,500 people would fit inside the church and on a Sunday morning there were more than 1,000 people standing outside the church building without a sound system, rendering many unable to hear the speaker.

The church building of St Theresina's was extremely dilapidated and showed signs of the years of war for independence. The piles of rocks surrounding St Theresina's were to be part of a new church building. They had been brought there by families each week, when they attend Mass. Their hope was that these rocks would contribute to the foundations of the new church. In addition, Fr. Tiago had started a ‘ten-cent fund’ where each family willingly contributed 10c each week. The money collected was used for the rebuilding of their church.

The expansion and rebuilding of the church was expected to take up to 10 years to complete. Support was also being sourced from the Timor-Leste Government and other organisations, including Catholic communities in other countries.

The small town of Ossu is also famous because Bishop Carlos Filipe Ximenes Belo attended the Catholic school here.
