= Dom Aleixo =

Timorese chieftain

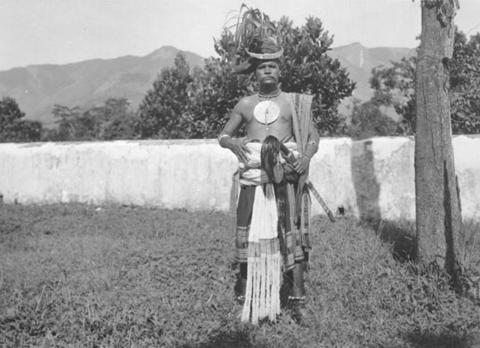
- Aleixo Corte-Real in 1940
- Born: Nai-Seço; 1886; Soro, Ainaro, Portuguese Timor
- Died: 5 May 1943 (aged 56–57); Hato-Udo, Ainaro, Japanese Timor

Nai-Seço (1886 – May 1943), better known under the name of Dom Aleixo, was a Timorese chieftain (régulo) who was aligned with the Portuguese during the East Timorese rebellion of 1911–1912 and World War II. He died fighting the Empire of Japan during the Battle of Timor and was posthumously praised by the Portuguese.

== Life ==
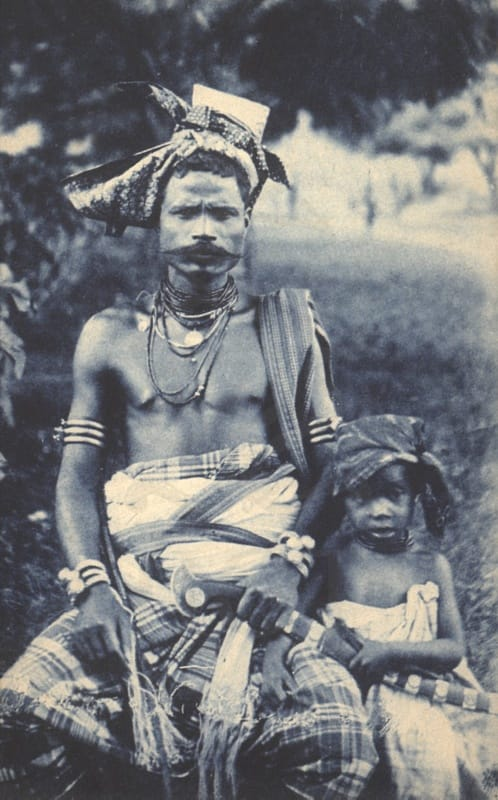
Aleixo Corte-Real in 1918

Dom Aleixo was born in Ainaro, in 1886, under the name Nai-Seço. His cousin Nai-Cau was the leader of Suro and fought for the Portuguese in the East Timorese rebellion of 1911–1912 against the bordering areas led by Liurai Boaventura of Manifahi. Aleixo also sided with the Portuguese during the conflict. He married Dona Maria Corte-Real.

Maubisse rose up in rebellion against the Portuguese in August 1942, and Aleixo sent 350 men to fight against them. He fought against the Japanese during the Battle of Timor, but his forces were pushed back from Suro to Hatu-Udo. Quei-Bere, chief of Foe-Ai-Lico and now aligned with the Japanese, separated Aleixo from his men. On 5 May 1943, Aleixo's men were disarmed and Aleixo was captured. He fought the Japanese while in captivity and was killed by a sword. Those with him, including his children, also fought, but almost all of them were killed. Only three people survived.

== Legacy ==
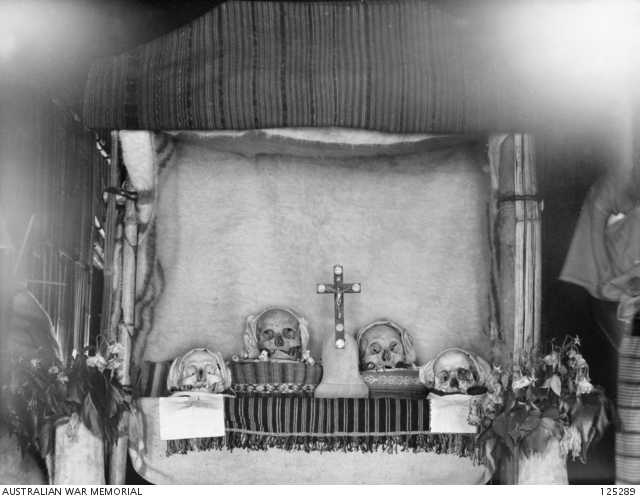
Skulls of Dom Aleixo and his three sons

Governor Manuel de Abreu Ferreira de Carvalho learned about Aleixo's story after World War II ended. Carvalho praised him as a martyr for Portugal and Aleixo was the first native Timorese that was made Portuguese. Portugal held up Aleixo as a loyal native king and national hero. His image was placed onto banknotes.

A grave was created for Aleixo on 7 September 1946. On 30 October, he was made Commander of the Military Order of Torre e Espada, of Valor, Loyalty and Merit posthumously. His widow and children were among the forty people listed by the Portuguese government in a gazette for their loyalty during the war. The first biography of Aleixo was written by José Simões Martinho in 1947.

== See also ==
- Japanese occupation of Portuguese Timor

== Works cited ==
=== Books ===
- Tsuchiya, Kisho (2024). Emplacing East Timor: Regime Change and Knowledge Production, 1860–2010. University of Hawaiʻi Press. ISBN 9780824894993.

=== Journals ===
- Farram, Steven (2017). "Colonial Neighbours in an Era of Change: Portugal and the Netherlands in Timor, 1945–1949". Bijdragen tot de Taal-, Land- en Volkenkunde. 173 (1). Brill Publishers: 23–52. doi:10.2307/26281574. JSTOR 26281574.
- Tsuchiya, Kisho (2019). "Representing Timor: Histories, geo-bodies, and belonging, 1860s–2018". Journal of Southeast Asian Studies. 50 (3). Cambridge University Press: 365–386. doi:10.2307/26859704. JSTOR 26859704.
