= Ave Maria Church =

Roman Catholic church in Suai, East Timor

Coordinates: 9.3156°S 125.2544°E

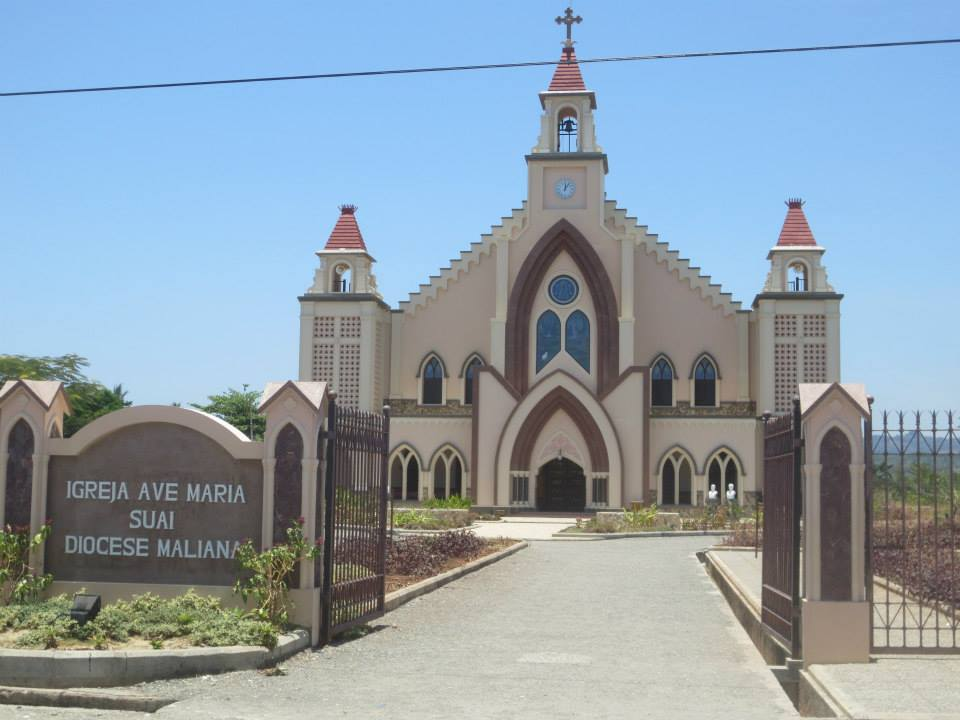
Ave Maria church

Ave Maria Church is a Latin Rite, Roman Catholic church in Suai, East Timor. The town of Suai stands 180 km from the Timorese capital of Dili, in the Cova Lima municipality and is part of the Diocese of Maliana.

The Ave Maria church has a 70-foot-tall steeple.
