= Fatubessi, Ermera =

Coordinates: 08°44′54″S 125°19′34″E

Fatubessi (Fatu Besi, Fatoe Bessi) is one of thirteen municipalities (sucos) under the sub-district administration of Hatulia, Ermera District, Timor-Leste. There is a road east from Fatubessi to the town of Ermera.

The area of Fatubessi is occupied by the former coffee plantation of the SAPT company, a Portuguese colony exploratory company in Ermera District. Fatubessi is the home of the "Hybrid of Timor" rust-resistant coffee tree, a natural hybrid of Arabica and Robusta, whose seed was sent out into the world in 1953, begetting many other coffee trees. The village also has a statue of former Portuguese Governor José Celestino da Silva, who started the coffee plantations in Timor, and one of the Catholic statue of Mother Mary Peregrine.

Fatubessi Municipality has six sub-villages (aldeia): São Francisco, Peregrinacao (Peregrina), Matanoba (Matanova), Sabsoi (Safesoy), Lebumeo, and Assulau Hautete (Asulau). During the Timor independence movement, it was chosen to be the administrative center for the six villages in order to simplify access and services for the future municipality.

== Notable people ==
- Domingos Maubere (1952–2025), Catholic priest and activist, raised in Fatubessi from infancy
