= Norberto do Amaral =

Roman Catholic bishop of Maliana, East Timor (born 1956)

The Most Reverend Norberto do Amaral
- Bishop of Maliana
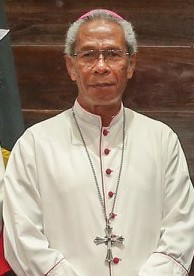
- Amaral in 2020
- Church: Roman Catholic Church
- Province: Díli; (since 11 September 2019)
- Diocese: Maliana
- Appointed: 30 January 2010
- Predecessor: Office established
- Other posts: President, Episcopal Conference of Timor Leste; (2019–present)

Orders
- Ordination: 18 October 1988
- Consecration: 24 April 2010 by Leopoldo Girelli

Personal details
- Born: Norberto do Amaral; 17 February 1956 (age 70) Ainaro, Portuguese Timor (now East Timor)
- Denomination: Roman Catholic
- Education: Seminary of Our Lady of Fatima; Major Seminary of St. Peter; Pontifical Urban University
- Motto: Veritas in Caritate; ('Truth through Caring')
- Coat of arms

Norberto do Amaral (born 17 February 1956) is the Roman Catholic Bishop of Maliana, East Timor. He was appointed on 30 January 2010. Previously, he served as an assistant pastor and as a pastor, as Rector of the Diocesan Minor Seminary in the Diocese of Díli, and in other offices in the Catholic Church in East Timor.

== Early life and education ==
Amaral was born in Ainaro in the then Portuguese Timor (now East Timor), and attended the local elementary Catholic school. Between 1981 and 1983, he studied philosophy at the Seminary of Our Lady of Fatima at Dare in the then Dili District.

In 1984, Amaral carried out a year of pastoral ministry in the parish of Ossu, in the then Viqueque District. From 1985 to 1988, he studied theology at the Major Seminary of St. Peter in Ritapiret, Flores, Indonesia.

== Ministry ==
=== Priesthood ===
On 18 October 1988, Amaral was ordained as a priest for the Roman Catholic Diocese of Díli. He later served in the following positions in that diocese: Assistant Pastor of the Parish of Ainaro, 1988; Pastor of the Parish of Maubisse, 1989–2000; Rector of the Diocesan Minor Seminary in Dili, 2000–2004.

In 2005–2007, Amaral undertook studies for a licentiate in dogmatic theology at the Pontifical Urban University in Rome. From 2007, he was Professor of Dogmatic Theology and Prefect of Studies at the Major Seminary in Dili. From 2008, he served as Chancellor of the Diocese of Dili and Director of the Diocesan Magazine Seara.

=== Episcopacy ===
When Pope Benedict XVI erected the Roman Catholic Diocese of Maliana on 30 January 2010, he appointed Amaral as its first bishop. Amaral was consecrated by Archbishop Leopoldo Girelli, the then apostolic nuncio to East Timor, on 24 April 2010, with Alberto Ricardo da Silva, Bishop of Díli, and Basílio do Nascimento, Bishop of Baucau, as co-consecrators, and was installed the following day.

The consecration ceremony was held at the Sanctuary of John Paul II, in Tasitolu, Dili, and the installation took place in Maliana.

In August 2015, Amaral joined with Archbishop Girelli, Bishop Nascimento, 8,000 faithful, and Archbishop Joseph Marino, the new apostolic nuncio to East Timor, in a celebration of 500 years of the Catholic Church's presence in East Timor. The main celebrant was Vatican Secretary of State Cardinal Pietro Parolin.

On 20 June 2017, Amaral blessed the new Kay Rala Xanana Gusmão International Airport in Suai during its official inauguration. Also present were President Francisco Guterres, Prime Minister Rui Maria de Araújo, former President and Prime Minister Xanana Gusmão and many government and church leaders.

Three months later, on 26 September 2017, Archbishop Marino, Bishop Nascimento and Amaral all attended the opening of St. Joseph Seminary, the country's second minor seminary, in Amaral's diocese. The new seminary, located within a refurbished building owned by a local diocesan school, was set to begin with 22 students.

In 2019, Amaral took office as President of the Episcopal Conference of Timor Leste (CET), in place of its inaugural President, Bishop Nascimento.

On 26 March 2020, Amaral, along with Archbishop Virgílio do Carmo da Silva and Bishop Nascimento, signed a statement confirming a decision of the Timorese Episcopal Conference cancelling mass during Easter in the whole of East Timor, due to the COVID-19 pandemic. In May 2020, the three bishops issued a statement officially reopening churches for Eucharistic celebrations.

In early March 2022, in the lead up to that month's presidential election in East Timor, Amaral, together with Archbishop do Carmo da Silva and Father Alipio Pinto Gusmao, Administrator of the Baucau diocese, sent a pastoral letter to all Catholics stating that politics is a "sacrament", and asserting that:

"All Christians involved in politics should live a political ethos based on the teachings of the Church about how to be a good person in the world and that faith in God should be used to measure politics."

In April 2023, ahead of that year's East Timorese parliamentary election on 21 May, Amaral called upon politicians to "take a role in maintaining peace and stability" rather than "attack each other or spread hatred in the presence of supporters."

== Personal life ==
At the end of February 2022, Amaral underwent intensive treatment at Guido Valadares National Hospital (HNGV) in Dili for hypertension. In March 2022, he flew to Malaysia for further medical treatment. He returned the following month.

Catholic Church titles
New title	Bishop of Maliana; 2010–present	Incumbent
