= Japanese occupation of Portuguese Timor =

Imperial Japanese military occupation of Portuguese Timor

Japanese occupation of Timor ティモール占領地 (Japanese)
- Flag Imperial Seal
- Motto: 八紘一宇 ("Hakkō Ichiu") "Eight Crown Cords, One Roof"
- Anthem: 君が代 ("Kimigayo") "His Majesty's Reign"
- Status: Military occupation by the Empire of Japan
- Capital: Dili
- Common languages: Japanese; Portuguese
- Emperor
  - 1942–1945: Hirohito
- Historical era: World War II
- Currency: Japanese military yen
Preceded by	Succeeded by
Portuguese Timor	Portuguese Timor
- Today part of: East Timor

Portuguese Timor was occupied by the Empire of Japan during World War II, between February 1942 until August 1945. It led to a major humanitarian disaster, where about 15% of the population perished from famine, breakdown of agriculture, disease, overwork or military reprisal.

The entire Portuguese administration was interned in the Liquiçá-Maubara concentration camps, the only exception being a group of former socialists and deportees styled the Red Brigades, who fled to the mountains to resist the Japanese. Other pro-Allied groups were evacuated to Australia and many Timorese would die as a result of their support for the allies.

Portuguese dictator António Salazar protested bitterly the violation of Portuguese neutrality, though he never broke official diplomatic relations with Japan. By the war's end, Portuguese ships that arrived from Mozambique revived the administration and provided invaluable relief for the population. Salazar also managed to win American support for Portugal's post-war role in Timor.

== See also ==
- Battle of Timor
- Dom Aleixo
- Japanese occupation of the Dutch East Indies
