= Franciscan Hospitaller Sisters of the Immaculate Conception =

Catholic religious institute

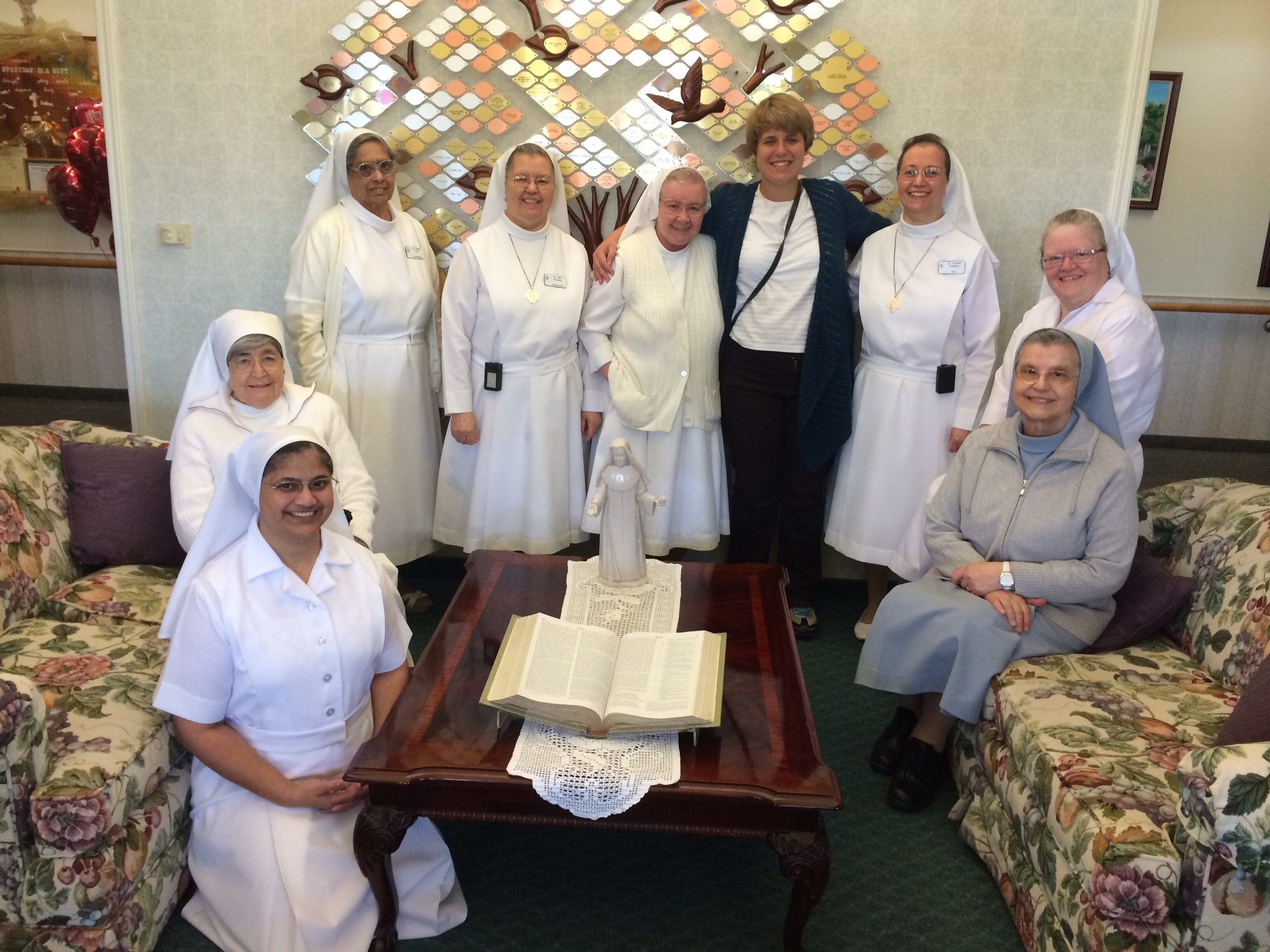
A visitor (center) meets with some Franciscan Hospitaller Sisters in Los Banos, California, who are all nurses (white habits) except for one (grey habit).

The Franciscan Hospitaller Sisters of the Immaculate Conception are members of a Roman Catholic religious institute of consecrated women, which was founded in Portugal in 1871. They follow the Rule of the Third Order Regular of St. Francis. and, as the term “hospitaller” indicates, focus their ministries on a spirit of medical care. Their charism emphasizes hospitality and service under the model of the Good Samaritan. In this congregation, the postnominal initials used after each sister's name is "F.H.I.C."

The sisters’ mission, as expressed by their foundress, Maria Clara, is "to do good where good needs to be done". These words have paved the way for a large variety of apostolates including education, catechesis, healthcare, pastoral work, assisting the elderly, missionary work, running orphanages, assisting immigrants, and assisting the homeless. The local needs where each convent is located oftentimes determine the apostolates of the sisters who live there, although generally each sister is also able to choose her preferred field of ministry to carry out. Ordinarily the habits that the sisters wear are grey, but those sisters working in the healthcare field don white habits while they are working. The daily prayer life of the sisters in this order consists of Mass, an hour of Eucharistic adoration, Liturgy of the Hours, and the rosary.

== History ==
On June 15, 1843 Libânia do Carmo Galvão Mexia de Moura Telles de Albuquerque was born in Amadora, Portugal. This third child of seven in a noble and devout Christian family had a very happy childhood until 1856 and 1857 when she suddenly lost her parents to a cholera and yellow fever epidemic. At age 14 she entering a boarding school for orphaned nobility. This school was run by the Daughters of Charity until they were expelled from Portugal in 1882 due to the anticlerical laws then passed.

For five years Telles de Albuquerque then lived in the palace of the Marquis of Valada. In 1869 at the age of 26, she entered religious life as a Capuchin nun, receiving the name Sister Maria Clara of the Infant Jesus. She soon desired to form a new community that would serve the people of Portugal who were wounded in a time of political unrest. Supported by the priest Raimundo dos Anjos Beirão, she traveled to Calais, France, for her novitiate formation under the Franciscan Hospitaller Sisters of that city, preparing to found a new community after her novitiate has been completed. After professing her vows in France on April 14, 1871, she founded the first house of her new community, called the "Congregation of the Hospitaller Sisters of the Poor for the Love of God", in Lisbon on May 3, 1871. Only five years later, on March 27, 1876, the congregation was approved by Pope Pius IX.

Despite many trials, the new religious institute continued to grow rapidly with more and more convents being established. The large number of sick, poor, and orphaned people found relief in the houses which the Sisters opened to shelter and care for them. 1883, the sisters sent their first missionaries to Angola; three years later they expanded their service to the Portuguese colony of Goa, now part of India.

On December 1, 1899, Telles de Albuquerque died. Her remains are in the crypt of the chapel of the general motherhouse in Lisbon, where many people still come to pray and ask her intercession. She was beatified on May 21, 2011, by Pope Benedict XVI, and her canonization process continues.

== Legacy ==
In 2026, this international congregation is represented in fifteen countries.

=== United States ===
In the United States, the sisters are located only in the state of California, residing in the Dioceses of San Jose, Fresno, and Monterey.

The Hospitaller Sisters first came to the United States in 1960 in order to aid Portuguese immigrants. These sisters ran and taught in schools, but their education and catechesis work has come to consist of teaching Rite of Christian Initiation of Adults and Faith Formation, or Confraternity of Christian Doctrine. The majority of the California sisters now are involved in healthcare. In Los Banos, where eleven sisters now live, the sisters run a non-profit house of residential care and skilled nursing for the elderly. This facility, called New Bethany, after the village of Bethany that Jesus stayed in, was opened in 1999. The sisters attend to their patients' physical needs, and to their spiritual needs through frequent public prayer and liturgy. The sisters in the three California houses also visit the sick and bring them Holy Communion. The United States province is the smallest of the fifteen CONFHIC provinces worldwide, but has had a renewed interest in their lifestyle amongst young women who are discerning a religious vocation. The convent in San Jose is designated as the house of formation for American vocations.
