= Ossu, Timor-Leste =

Coordinates: 8°44′S 126°22′E

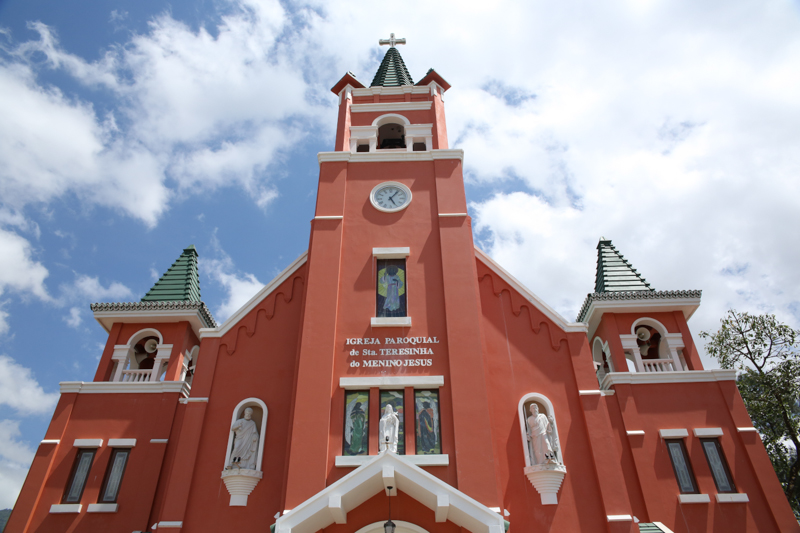
Sta. Teresinha do Menino Jesus

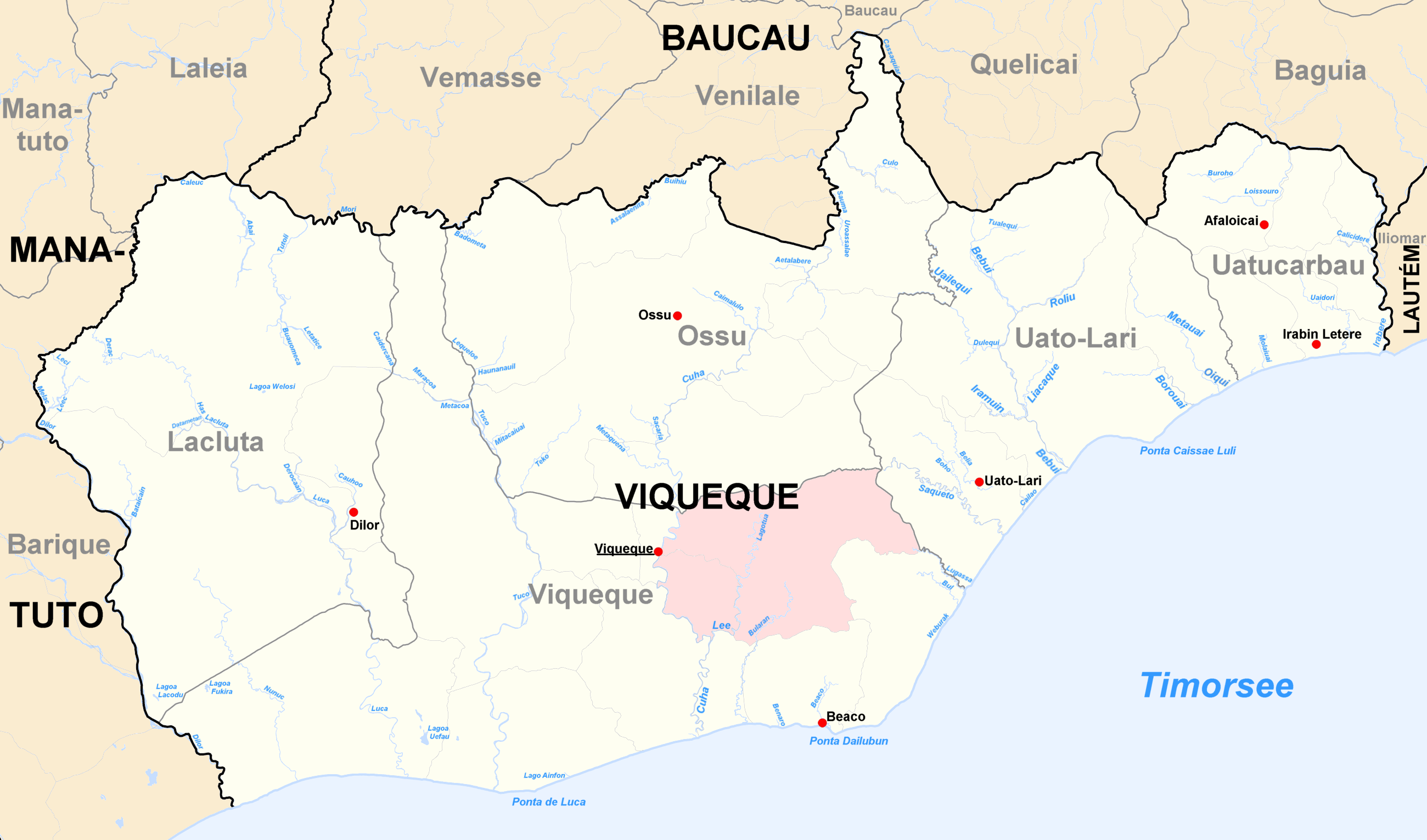
Viqueque District

Ossu is a town in Ossu Subdistrict, Viqueque District, Timor-Leste. Located 622 meters (2,041 ft) above sea level it lies approximately 13 kilometres (8.1 mi) in a straight line north of the district capital of Viqueque and about 91 kilometres (57 mi) southeast of the capital Dili. Ossu is surrounded by several mountains: the Monte Mundo Perdido in the west, the Builo in the south, the Matebian massif in the east and the Fatu Laritame the north.

In the village there is a community health center, a helipad, a primary school, a pre-secondary school and a secondary school, the Sta. Teresina Colegio. There is the Catholic parish church of Sta. Teresinha do Menino Jesus (Teresa of the Child Jesus), which was inaugurated on 30 November 2012, in the town.
