= Deaths in February 2021 =

The following is a list of notable deaths in February 2021.

Entries for each day are listed alphabetically by surname. A typical entry lists information in the following sequence:

- Name, age, country of citizenship at birth, subsequent country of citizenship (if applicable), reason for notability, cause of death (if known), and reference.

== February 2021 ==
=== 1 ===
- Soraya Abdullah, 42, Indonesian actress, COVID-19.
- Edward Babiuch, 93, Polish politician, prime minister (1980) and MP (1969–1980).
- Kwasi Baffoe-Bonnie, 71, Ghanaian media executive and politician.
- Bruce Blackburn, 82, American graphic designer (NASA).
- Umberto Bruni, 106, Canadian artist and painter.
- Tony Burns, 80, British boxer and trainer.
- Chuck Cottier, 85, American baseball player (Washington Senators, Milwaukee Braves) and coach (Chicago Cubs).
- Naty Crame-Rogers, 98, Filipino actress (A Portrait of the Artist as Filipino).
- Merryl Wyn Davies, 72, Welsh Muslim scholar.
- Dustin Diamond, 44, American actor (Saved by the Bell, Purple People Eater, Good Morning, Miss Bliss) and comedian, heart failure caused by lung cancer.
- Emil J. Freireich, 93, American oncologist, COVID-19.
- Rachna Gilmore, 67, Canadian children's writer.
- Jonas Gricius, 92, Lithuanian cinematographer (Hamlet, The Girl and the Echo, The Blue Bird).
- Joshua Hamidu, 85, Ghanaian military officer and diplomat, chief of the defence staff (1978–1979), high commissioner to Zambia (1978) and Nigeria (2003–2005).
- Peter Hindley, 76, English footballer (Nottingham Forest, Coventry City, Peterborough United), dementia.
- Mark Jensen, 60, Canadian Olympic luger (1980).
- Robert C. Jones, 84, American film editor (It's a Mad, Mad, Mad, Mad World, Guess Who's Coming to Dinner) and screenwriter (Coming Home), Oscar winner (1979).
- Jean-Pierre Jossua, 90, French writer and theologian, COVID-19.
- Chuck Kaye, 80, American music industry executive, COVID-19.
- Ewald Kienle, 92, German inventor.
- Viktor Koval, 73, Russian writer, artist and child actor (The Rumyantsev Case, An Unusual Summer), COVID-19.
- Charlotte L'Écuyer, 77, Canadian politician, Quebec MNA (2003–2014).
- Arlon Lindner, 85, American politician, member of the Minnesota House of Representatives (1993–2005).
- Robert D. Mare, 69, Canadian-born American sociologist, leukemia.
- Tony Momoh, 81, Nigerian politician and journalist, minister of information and culture (1986–1990).
- Aleksandr Nazarchuk, 81, Russian politician, deputy (1990–1993), minister of agriculture (1994–1996), and chair of the Altai Krai Legislative Assembly (1996–2008).
- P. S. Nivas, 75, Indian cinematographer and film director (Kallukkul Eeram, Enakkaga Kaathiru, Nizhal Thedum Nenjangal).
- Peter Noyes, 90, American newscaster and reporter.
- Simeon Nyachae, 88, Kenyan politician and financier, minister for finance (1998–1999).
- Jack Palladino, 76, American private investigator and attorney, head injury.
- Victor Pavlyuchenkov, 57, Russian stuntman and actor.
- Ricky Powell, 59, American photographer, heart failure.
- Serhiy Proskurnia, 63, Ukrainian stage director.
- Abd al-Sattar Qasim, 72, Palestinian writer, COVID-19.
- Tamara Rylova, 89, Russian speed skater, Olympic bronze medallist (1960).
- Đuro Savinović, 70, Croatian Olympic water polo player (1976).
- Walter Savitch, 78, American computer scientist, complications from Parkinson's disease.
- Jacqueline Shumiatcher, 97, Canadian philanthropist.
- Harold Stephens, 94, American author and adventurer, stroke. (death announced on this date)
- Charles Stewart, 93, American politician.
- John Sweeney, 86, American labor leader, president of the AFL–CIO (1995–2009).
- Ryszard Szurkowski, 75, Polish road bicycle racer, Olympic silver medallist (1972, 1976).
- Jamie Tarses, 56, American television executive (ABC Entertainment) and producer (Happy Endings, My Boys), complications from a stroke.
- Jean-Marie Touratier, 77, French writer, author and artistic director.
- Gilbert Tshiongo Tshibinkubula wa Ntumba, 78, Congolese politician, governor of Kasaï-Occidental (2006), president of Regideso.
- Temur Tsiklauri, 75, Georgian pop singer and actor, COVID-19.
- Cynthia Turner, 88, Maltese pianist, COVID-19.
- Steven A. White, 92, American Navy admiral.

=== 2 ===
- Naim Attallah, 89, Palestinian-born British book publisher, COVID-19.
- Manfred Baerns, 86, German chemist.
- Costică Bărăgan, 71, Romanian Olympic fencer.
- Peg Blitch, 86, American politician.
- Brutus, 19, American grizzly bear.
- Roy Christopher, 85, American art director and production designer (Frasier, Murphy Brown, Wings).
- Mitrofan Cioban, 79, Moldovan mathematician, member of the Academy of Sciences of Moldova.
- Maureen Colquhoun, 92, British politician, MP (1974–1979).
- Richie Cornwall, 74, American basketball player.
- Rennie Davis, 80, American antiwar activist (Chicago Seven), lymphoma.
- Libuše Domanínská, 96, Czech operatic soprano.
- David Donato, 66, American singer (White Tiger, Black Sabbath).
- Peter Dunn, 91, British paediatrician.
- Gordon W. Duffy, 96, American politician, member of the California State Assembly (1965–1974, 1974–1982).
- Héctor Epalza Quintero, 80, Colombian Roman Catholic prelate, bishop of Buenaventura (2004–2017).
- Heike Fleßner, 76, German educationalist.
- Reggie Ford, 67, Guyanese Olympic boxer (1972).
- Charan Gill, 84, Canadian social activist and community leader, cancer.
- Walter Graf, 83, Swiss bobsledder, Olympic bronze medalist (1968).
- Cecília Guimarães, 93, Portuguese actress, COVID-19.
- Albert Hale, 70, American politician, president of the Navajo Nation (1995–1998), member of the Arizona House of Representatives (2011–2017) and Senate (2004–2011), COVID-19.
- Pastor Heydra, 72, Venezuelan journalist, columnist and politician, deputy and MP, stroke due to complications from COVID-19.
- Millie Hughes-Fulford, 75, American astronaut (STS-40) and molecular biologist, lymphoma.
- Denis Huisman, 91, French academic and writer.
- Grant Jackson, 78, American baseball player (Philadelphia Phillies, Baltimore Orioles, Pittsburgh Pirates), World Series champion (1979), complications from COVID-19.
- Kim Bo-kyung, 44, South Korean actress (Friend, Epitaph, The Day He Arrives), liver cancer.
- Jeremy Mallinson, 83, English conservationist, zookeeper (Jersey Zoo), and author.
- Laura Mason, 63, British food historian, cancer.
- Captain Sir Tom Moore, 100, British military officer and charity campaigner.
- Fausta Morganti, 76, Sammarinese politician, captain regent (2005), COVID-19.
- Zwelifile Ntuli, 67, South African politician, member of the National Assembly (2009–2014) and KwaZulu-Natal Legislature (2014–2019), COVID-19.
- Vera Nunes, 92, Brazilian actress.
- John O'Keeffe, 95, Irish Gaelic footballer (Millstreet).
- John Henry Osmeña, 86, Filipino politician, member of the House of Representatives (1969–1971, 1995–1998) and Senate (1971–1972, 1987–1995, 1998–2004).
- Rudolph Pariser, 97, American theoretical chemist (Pariser-Parr-Pople method).
- Harry Mark Petrakis, 97, American novelist.
- Robert Pinker, 89, British sociologist.
- Ilse Rieth, 92, German church musician and choir director.
- David Seyfort Ruegg, 89, American-British Buddhologist, complications from COVID-19.
- Abu Salman Shahjahanpuri, 81, Pakistani Islamic historian.
- Frank Tandberg, 61, Norwegian author.
- Jean-François Voguet, 71, French politician, senator (2001–2016), COVID-19.

=== 3 ===
- Joann Aalfs, 97, American women's rights and LGBT rights activist.
- Robert A. Altman, 74, American video game executive, co-founder and CEO of ZeniMax Media.
- Antonio Amato, 86, Italian Olympic rower.
- Ali Ansarian, 43, Iranian footballer (Persepolis, Shahrdari Tabriz, national team), COVID-19.
- Jean-Pierre Bastiat, 71, French rugby union player (US Dax, national team), stroke.
- Benito Boldi, 86, Italian footballer (Catania, Cesena, Biellese), complications from COVID-19.
- Nilson Borges, 79, Brazilian footballer (Portuguesa-SP, Atlético Paranaense).
- Klaus Bühler, 80, German politician, MP (1976–2002).
- Joan Corbella, 76, Spanish psychiatrist and science communicator.
- Norbert Eimer, 80, German politician, MP (1976–1994).
- Gilles Fauconnier, 76, French linguist.
- Anne Feeney, 69, American folk singer-songwriter and political activist, complications from COVID-19.
- James Fenton, 89, Northern Irish Ulster Scots poet.
- Haya Harareet, 89, Israeli actress (Ben-Hur, The Secret Partner, The Interns).
- John H. Hoffman, 91, American space scientist.
- Willard Hunter, 85, American baseball player (Los Angeles Dodgers, New York Mets).
- Alijan Ibragimov, 67, Uzbek-born Kazakh mining executive.
- Jamali Shadat, 78, Malaysian actor (Sun Sun Thatha, Raja Lawak Astro, Upin & Ipin) and comedian, stroke.
- Abdelkader Jerbi, Tunisian film director.
- Adelaide João, 99, Portuguese actress (The End of the World), COVID-19.
- Art Jones, 85, Canadian ice hockey player (New Westminster Royals, Portland Buckaroos, Seattle Totems).
- Ismail Kijo, 68, Malaysian politician, Selangor MLA (1995–2008), COVID-19.
- Mahmoud Koushan, 88, Iranian cinematographer (Broken Spell).
- Patrick Lebon, 81, Belgian film director and screenwriter.
- Abdoul Aziz Mbaye, 66, Senegalese diplomat and politician, minister of culture (2012–2014), COVID-19.
- Pepi Merisio, 90, Italian photographer and photojournalist.
- Peter Nicholls, 84, New Zealand sculptor.
- Arthur W. Nienhuis, 79, American hematologist, CEO of the St. Jude Children's Research Hospital (1993–2004).
- Norbert Owona, 70, Cameroonian footballer (Union Douala, national team).
- Barry Pashak, 83, Canadian politician, Alberta MLA (1986–1993).
- Vera Pedrosa, 85, Brazilian diplomat and poet.
- Régine Robin, 81, Canadian historian, novelist and sociologist.
- Pong Sarasin, 93, Thai conglomerate executive and politician, deputy prime minister (1986–1990).
- Jean-Daniel Simon, 78, French film director, screenwriter (Adélaïde) and actor (Vice and Virtue, Love at Sea).
- Ashley Stephenson, 94, British horticulturalist.
- M. Bala Subramanion, 103, Singaporean civil servant, postmaster-general (1967–1971).
- Henry Tarvainen, 76, Canadian actor, COVID-19.
- Wayne Terwilliger, 95, American baseball player (Chicago Cubs, Washington Senators, New York Giants) and coach, complications from dementia and bladder cancer.
- Tony Trabert, 90, American Hall of Fame tennis player, executive, and sports commentator, Wimbledon champion (1955).
- Albán Vermes, 63, Hungarian swimmer, Olympic silver medalist (1980).
- Jim Weatherly, 77, American Hall of Fame singer-songwriter ("Midnight Train to Georgia", "Neither One of Us", "You're the Best Thing That Ever Happened to Me").
- Robb Webb, 82, American voice artist (60 Minutes, NFL Films, Fishing with John), complications from COVID-19.
- Margreth Weivers, 94, Swedish actress (Det är långt till New York, Lotta på Bråkmakargatan, Spring of Joy).
- Dahiru Yahaya, 73, Nigerian historian.

=== 4 ===
- Firouz Bagherzadeh, 90, Iranian architect and art scholar.
- William Bains-Jordan, 104, American politician, member of the Hawaii House of Representatives (1959–1962).
- Paolo Bartolozzi, 63, Italian politician, MEP (1999–2014).
- Frank Baude, 84, Swedish politician, leader of the Communist Party (1970−1998), heart attack.
- Tom Bolton, 77, American-Canadian astronomer.
- Boulos Nassif Borkhoche, 88, Lebanese-born Syrian Melkite Greek Catholic hierarch, archbishop of Bosra-Hauran (1983–2011).
- Rachel Feldhay Brenner, 74, Polish-born American literary scholar.
- A. David Buckingham, 91, Australian chemist.
- Hüner Coşkuner, 57, Turkish singer, multiple myeloma.
- Hy Cohen, 90, American baseball player (Chicago Cubs), complications from COVID-19.
- Robert Dean, 93, Canadian politician, Quebec MNA (1981–1985).
- Harry Donnelly, 83, Irish Gaelic footballer (Offaly).
- Dianne Durham, 52, American gymnast.
- Josh Evans, 48, American football player (Tennessee Titans, New York Jets), kidney cancer.
- Solomon Faine, 94, New Zealand microbiologist.
- Neville Fernando, 89, Sri Lankan physician and politician, MP (1977–1989) and founder of Neville Fernando Teaching Hospital, COVID-19.
- Santiago García, 30, Uruguayan footballer (Nacional, River Plate-UY, Godoy Cruz), suicide by gunshot.
- Ben Hannigan, 77, Irish footballer (Shelbourne, Wrexham, Dundalk).
- D. N. Jha, 81, Indian historian.
- Pyotr Kolodin, 90, Russian cosmonaut.
- Franz Josef Kuhnle, 94, German Roman Catholic prelate, auxiliary bishop of Rottenburg-Stuttgart (1976–1990).
- Mathoor Govindan Kutty, 81, Indian Kathakali artist, COVID-19.
- Robert Labine, 80, Canadian politician, mayor of Gatineau (1988–1994, 1999–2001), stroke.
- Cesare Leonardi, 85, Italian architect.
- Charles McGee, 96, American painter.
- Jaime Murrell, 71, Panamanian Christian singer and songwriter, COVID-19.
- Pierre-Antoine Paulo, 76, Haitian Roman Catholic prelate, coadjutor bishop (2001–2008) and bishop (2008–2020) of Port-de-Paix.
- Nolan Porter, 71, American R&B singer-songwriter.
- R. T. Ramachandran, 73, Indian cricket umpire.
- Ri Jae-il, 86, North Korean politician, first deputy director of the Propaganda and Agitation Department (2004–2014), lung cancer.
- Pavlos Samios, Greek painter and academic.
- Gil Saunders, 68, American soul singer (Harold Melvin & the Blue Notes), lung cancer and multiple sclerosis.
- David Shepard, 73, American politician, member of the Tennessee House of Representatives (2001–2017), cancer and COVID-19.
- Lokman Slim, 58, Lebanese publisher and political activist, shot.
- Jessie Smith, 79, American R&B singer (The Ikettes).
- F. Christian Thompson, 76, American entomologist.
- Robert Torres, 82, Brazilian politician, complications from COVID-19.
- Samuel Vestey, 3rd Baron Vestey, 79, British peer and landowner, master of the horse (1999–2018).
- William George Wells, 81, Australian scouting leader, chief scout commissioner of Scouts Australia (1992–1999).
- Stanisław Wołodko, 70, Polish Olympic discus thrower (1976).
- Vlastimil Zábranský, 84, Czech visual artist, pneumonia.

=== 5 ===
- Ezzat El Alaili, 86, Egyptian actor (The Land, Alexandria... Why?, War in the Land of Egypt).
- Robert Armstrong, 77, British racehorse trainer.
- Susan Bayh, 61, American attorney, first lady of Indiana (1989–1997), glioblastoma.
- Jean Bayless, 88, British actress (Crossroads), bone cancer.
- Jules Bélanger, 91, Canadian academic.
- Isa Bellini, 98, Italian actress (The Happy Ghost, Without Family, Love and Anarchy), presenter and singer.
- Joseph Benz, 76, Swiss bobsledder and sports official, Olympic champion (1980), COVID-19.
- Julio Canani, 82, Peruvian-born American racehorse breeder and trainer, COVID-19.
- Ruth Dayan, 103, Israeli fashion house owner and social activist, founder of Maskit.
- José Durañona, 97, Argentine Olympic swimmer.
- Dag Jostein Fjærvoll, 74, Norwegian politician, minister of defence (1997–1999) and transport (1999–2000), MP (1985–1997).
- Marie Charlotte Fayanga, 75, Central African politician and diplomat.
- Laurent Dona Fologo, 81, Ivorian politician, president of the Economic and Social Council (2000–2011).
- Imre Furmen, 87, Hungarian Olympic cyclist (1952).
- Sam Gannon, 73, Australian cricketer (Western Australia, national team).
- Alan Hill, 92, English cricket historian.
- Abdoul Jabbar, 41, Guinean singer-songwriter.
- Rob Kane, 53, American politician, member of the Connecticut Senate (2009–2017).
- James Bond Kamwambi, 53, Malawian politician, COVID-19.
- Robert E. Kelley, 87, American lieutenant general.
- Charlie Krueger, 84, American Hall of Fame football player (San Francisco 49ers), heart and kidney failure.
- Franck Louissaint, 71, Haitian painter.
- Jake McCoy, 79, American Olympic ice hockey player (1964).
- Douglas Miller, 71, American gospel singer.
- Edward Moore, 50, Irish cricketer (national team).
- Christopher Plummer, 91, Canadian actor (The Sound of Music, Beginners, All the Money in the World), Oscar winner (2012), complications from a fall.
- John Pullin, 79, English rugby union player (Bristol, national team, British Lions).
- Butch Reed, 66, American professional wrestler (Mid-South Wrestling, WWF) and football player (Kansas City Chiefs), heart complications from COVID-19.
- Said Shah, 80, Pakistani cricket umpire.
- Hershel Shanks, 90, American author and editor (Biblical Archaeology Review), founder of the Biblical Archaeology Society, COVID-19.
- Shen Zhonghou, 92, Chinese engineer, member of the Chinese Academy of Engineering.
- Atanas Skatov, 42, Bulgarian mountaineer, entomologist and ecologist, fall.
- R. C. Soles Jr., 86, American politician, member of the North Carolina House of Representatives (1969–1977) and Senate (1977–2011).
- Leon Spinks, 67, American boxer, WBA and WBC heavyweight champion (1978), Olympic champion (1976), prostate cancer.
- Ernie Tate, 86, Northern Irish-born Canadian Trotskyist and anti-war activist.
- Aurealius Thomas, 86, American Hall of Fame college football player (Ohio State Buckeyes).
- Sir Paul Tovua, 73, Solomon Islands politician, member (since 1976) and speaker (1994–2001) of parliament.
- Val Vigil, 73, American politician, member of the Colorado House of Representatives (1999–2007), stroke.
- Wim Vrösch, 75, Dutch football player (Sparta Rotterdam, Fortuna Sittard) and manager (Metalurh Donetsk).
- Vladimir Vysotsky, 66, Russian admiral, commander-in-chief of the navy (2007–2012).

=== 6 ===
- Thomas Rutherford Brett, 89, American jurist, judge (1979–2003) and chief judge (1994–1996) of the U.S. District Court for Northern Oklahoma.
- Syed Ata-ul-Muhaimin Bukhari, 75, Pakistani Islamic scholar, president of Majlis-e-Ahrar-ul-Islam (since 1995).
- Rajie Cook, 90, American graphic designer.
- Zezinho Corrêa, 69, Brazilian singer (Carrapicho), COVID-19.
- Élisabeth Du Réau, 84, French historian.
- Bodil Skjånes Dugstad, 93, Norwegian politician, deputy MP (1973–1977).
- Zamfir Dumitrescu, 74, Romanian painter.
- Nii Okwei Kinka Dowuona VI, 57, Ghanaian Ga leader, Osu Mantse (since 2010).
- Ioan Dzițac, 67, Romanian mathematician and computer scientist, heart attack.
- James Eayrs, 94, Canadian historian.
- Harry Fielder, 80, British actor (CBTV, Doctor Who, Blake's 7).
- Afonso Fioreze, 78, Brazilian Roman Catholic prelate, coadjutor bishop (2003–2004) and bishop (2004–2017) of Luziânia.
- Firmanzah, 44, Indonesian academic.
- Andrew Fraser, Baron Fraser of Corriegarth, 74, British financier and life peer, brain tumour.
- Maria Guarnaschelli, 79, American cookbook editor and publisher, complications from heart disease.
- Frank Hackinson, 93, American music publisher.
- Jolán Humenyánszky, 78, Hungarian sculptor.
- Burwell Jones, 87, American Olympic swimmer (1952).
- Kou Yang, 76, Hmong American scholar, complications from COVID-19.
- Bansi Kaul, 71, Indian theatre director.
- Hosea Kiplagat, 76, Kenyan politician and philanthropist, chair of the Co-operative Bank of Kenya.
- Krzysztof Kowalewski, 83, Polish actor (The Deluge, What Will You Do When You Catch Me?, Teddy Bear).
- Aleksandr Kozlov, 71, Russian politician, governor of Oryol Oblast (2009–2014). (death announced on this date)
- Alan Lerwill, 74, British long jumper, Commonwealth Games gold medalist (1974).
- Jan Willem Loot, 77, Dutch lawyer and cellist.
- Abdelkhalek Louzani, 75, Moroccan footballer (Anderlecht, K.V.V. Crossing Elewijt, Olympic Charleroi), COVID-19.
- Ken McCaffery, 91, Australian rugby league player (Eastern Suburbs, Queensland, national team).
- Columb McKinley, 70, Scottish footballer (Airdrieonians, Dumbarton).
- Osvaldo Mércuri, 76, Argentine politician, member (1985–2005) and president (1989–1997, 2001–2005) of the Buenos Aires Province Chamber of Deputies, COVID-19.
- Ezra Moseley, 63, Barbadian cricketer (Glamorgan, West Indies, national team), traffic collision.
- Louis Pailhas, 94, French civil servant.
- René Victor Pilhes, 86, French writer and publicist.
- Ossy Prestige, 56, Nigerian businessman and politician, member of the House of Representatives (since 2015).
- Ken Roberts, 84, Welsh football player (Aston Villa) and manager (Chester City).
- Miyuri Samarasinghe, 81, Sri Lankan actress (How to Be an Adult, Avurududa, Bheeshanaye Athuru Kathawak).
- George Shultz, 100, American politician, secretary of labor (1969–1970), the treasury (1972–1974), and state (1982–1989).
- Pál Simon, 91, Hungarian chemical engineer, politician, minister of heavy industry (1975–1980).
- Jarnail Singh, 67, Singaporean aviation medicine pioneer.
- Bruce Taylor, 77, New Zealand cricketer (Canterbury, Wellington, national team).
- Claudette White, 49, American jurist, chief judge of the Quechan Tribal Indian Court (2006–2020) and for the San Manuel Band of Mission Indians (2018–2020), complications from COVID-19.
- Monique Yvinou, 92, French Olympic gymnast (1948).

=== 7 ===
- Akhtar Ali, 81, Indian tennis player and coach.
- Ralph Backstrom, 83, Canadian ice hockey player (Montreal Canadiens, Los Angeles Kings), six-time Stanley Cup champion.
- Lilliane Brady, 90, Australian politician, mayor of Cobar Shire (1995–1999, 2001–2004, since 2007).
- Marshall Cassidy, 75, American public address announcer and sportscaster.
- Cheng Rongshi, 93, Chinese physical chemist, member of the Chinese Academy of Sciences.
- Cathy Cochran, 76, American jurist, judge of the Texas Court of Criminal Appeals (2001–2015).
- Louise Elisabeth Coldenhoff, 85, Indonesian military officer.
- Roz Cron, 95, American alto-saxophonist.
- Luis Feito, 91, Spanish painter, COVID-19.
- Pedro Gomez, 58, American sports journalist (The Mercury News, The Arizona Republic, ESPN).
- Oscar González Loyo, 61, Mexican comic book artist (Karmatron).
- Jerry Graves, 82, American basketball player (Mississippi State Bulldogs).
- Lew Hill, 55, American basketball coach (UTRGV Vaqueros).
- Maxine Horner, 88, American politician, member of the Oklahoma Senate (1986–2004).
- Jean Josselin, 81, French Olympic boxer (1960).
- Tommy Kenny, 87, Irish sports administrator, president of the Ladies' Gaelic Football Association (1977–1979).
- Robert J. Lagomarsino, 94, American politician, member of the California State Senate (1961–1974) and U.S. House of Representatives (1974–1993), secretary of the House Republican Conference (1985–1989).
- Leslie Laing, 95, Jamaican runner, Olympic champion (1952).
- Karen Lewis, 67, American labor leader, president of the Chicago Teachers Union (2010–2014), glioblastoma.
- Elliot Mazer, 79, American audio engineer and record producer.
- Stefano Mazzonis di Pralafera, 72, Italian opera director (Opéra Royal de Wallonie), cancer.
- J. Hillis Miller, 92, American literary critic, COVID-19.
- Nicole Mosconi, 78, French philosopher and professor.
- John Mullally, 90, Canadian politician, MP (1963–1965).
- José Ramón Ónega, 81, Spanish journalist, writer and politician, civil governor of Province of Zamora (1979–1982) and Biscay (1982–1984), COVID-19.
- Mario Osbén, 70, Chilean footballer (Colo-Colo, Cobreloa, national team), heart attack.
- Clayton Pachal, 64, Canadian ice hockey player (Boston Bruins, Colorado Rockies).
- Lula Pereira, 64, Brazilian football player (Santa Cruz, Ceará) and manager (Flamengo), complications from a stroke.
- Susan Playfair, 80, American author.
- Giuseppe Rotunno, 97, Italian cinematographer (All That Jazz, Amarcord, Sabrina), BAFTA winner (1981).
- Ricardo Silva Elizondo, 67, Mexican singer and actor (Destilando Amor, El premio mayor, Amigas y rivales), COVID-19.
- Duke Simpson, 93, American baseball player (Chicago Cubs), Alzheimer's disease.
- Moufida Tlatli, 73, Tunisian film director (The Silences of the Palace, The Season of Men), minister of culture (2011), COVID-19.
- Jackie Vautour, 91, Canadian fisherman and activist, liver cancer and pneumonia.
- Whelan Ward, 91, English footballer (Bradford City, King's Lynn).
- S. Clay Wilson, 79, American cartoonist (The Checkered Demon, Zap Comix).
- Ron Wright, 67, American politician, member of the U.S. House of Representatives (since 2019), COVID-19.

=== 8 ===
- Roza Akkuchukova, 70, Russian singer, COVID-19.
- Maaher At-Thuwailibi, 28, Indonesian Islamic preacher.
- Davey Armstrong, 64, American Olympic boxer (1972, 1976), complications from dementia.
- Malik Badri, 88, Sudanese psychologist.
- Luis Barruffa, 74, Uruguayan Olympic cyclist.
- Roland Berthiaume, 93, Canadian caricaturist.
- Stig Brøgger, 79, Danish artist.
- Servando Cano Rodríguez, 78, Mexican singer-songwriter and producer.
- Jean-Claude Carrière, 89, French novelist and screenwriter (The Discreet Charm of the Bourgeoisie, The Phantom of Liberty, The Unbearable Lightness of Being).
- Osvaldo Cattone, 88, Argentine theatre actor and director, prostate infection.
- Cala Cimenti, 45, Italian mountaineer, avalanche.
- Tony Collins, 94, English football player (Sheffield Wednesday, Watford) and manager (Rochdale).
- Claude Crabb, 80, American football player (Washington Redskins, Philadelphia Eagles, Los Angeles Rams), complications from COVID-19.
- Graham Day, 67, English footballer (Bristol Rovers, Portland Timbers).
- Dave Egerton, 59, English rugby union player (Bath, national team), COVID-19.
- Roger Englander, 94, American television director and producer.
- Nola Fairbanks, 96, American actress (Paint Your Wagon).
- Corrado Francia, 74, Italian singer.
- Terry Glenville, 77, English swimmer.
- Haguroyama Sojō, 86, Japanese sumo wrestler.
- George Hasay, 73, American politician, member of the Pennsylvania House of Representatives (1973–2006).
- Shlomo Hillel, 97, Iraqi-born Israeli politician and diplomat, speaker of the Knesset (1984–1988), minister of police (1969–1977) and internal affairs (1977).
- Darshan Lal Jain, 93, Indian social activist.
- Adam Kopczyński, 72, Polish Olympic ice hockey player (1972), COVID-19.
- Cyril Mango, 92, British scholar.
- José Maranhão, 87, Brazilian politician, deputy (1983–1994), senator (2003–2009, since 2015) and governor of Paraíba (1995–2002, 2009–2011), COVID-19.
- Robert Desmond Meikle, 97, Irish botanist.
- Jane Mellanby, 82, British neuroscientist, cancer.
- Shūichirō Moriyama, 86, Japanese actor (Shall We Dance?, Tsuribaka Nisshi Eleven, Ōedo Sōsamō) and voice actor, pneumonia.
- Harry A. McEnroe, 90, American politician, member of the New Jersey General Assembly (1980–1996).
- Joan Clark Netherwood, 88–89, American photographer.
- Yurnalis Ngayoh, 78, Indonesian civil servant and politician, governor of East Kalimantan (2006–2008).
- GertJan Nijpels, 69, Dutch politician, mayor of Opmeer (since 2004), cardiac arrest.
- Tokuyasu Nishii, 76, Japanese table tennis player.
- Jean Obeid, 81, Lebanese politician, minister of foreign affairs and emigrants (2003–2004) and MP (1991–2005, since 2018), COVID-19.
- Rynagh O'Grady, 66, Irish actress (Far and Away, Father Ted, Breakfast on Pluto).
- Stan Palys, 90, American baseball player (Philadelphia Phillies, Cincinnati Redlegs, Tokyo Orions).
- Haroon Rasheed, 58, Pakistani cricketer (Lahore, Pakistan Railways).
- Phil Rollins, 87, American basketball player (Philadelphia Warriors, Cincinnati Royals, Pittsburgh Rens).
- Marty Schottenheimer, 77, American football player (Buffalo Bills) and coach (Cleveland Browns, Kansas City Chiefs), complications from Alzheimer's disease.
- Willie Scott, 61, American football player (Kansas City Chiefs, New England Patriots).
- Anthony Sowell, 61, American serial killer.
- Michał Szewczyk, 86, Polish actor (Eroica, The Two Who Stole the Moon, The Young Magician).
- Tong Djoe, 94, Indonesian shipping executive.
- Els Vader, 61, Dutch Olympic sprinter (1980, 1984, 1988), major duodenal papilla cancer.
- Mary Wilson, 76, American Hall of Fame singer (The Supremes), hypertensive atherosclerotic cardiovascular disease.
- Vera Wülfing-Leckie, 66, German-born British homeopath and translator.
- Beatriz Yamamoto Cázarez, 63, Mexican politician, deputy (since 2012), COVID-19.
- Seyyed Mohammad Ziaabadi, Iranian Islamic scholar, coronary heart disease.

=== 9 ===
- Aleksandr Blinov, 66, Russian equestrian, Olympic champion (1980), hypothermia.
- Éamonn Breslin, 80, Irish Gaelic footballer (Ballyfermot Gaels, Dublin County).
- Roland Chassain, 74, French politician, deputy (2002–2007).
- Peter C. Clapman, 84, American investment chief executive, complications from COVID-19.
- Chick Corea, 79, American jazz keyboardist (Return to Forever) and songwriter ("Spain", "500 Miles High"), 23-time Grammy winner, cancer.
- Kojo Dadson, 68, Ghanaian actor (Love Brewed in the African Pot, Run Baby Run, Elmina) and musician.
- Michael Downing, 62, American writer and academic, cancer.
- Richard Elmore, American educator (HGSE).
- Gerald Feil, 87, American cinematographer (Friday the 13th Part III, Silent Madness, He Knows You're Alone).
- Valeria Gagealov, 89, Romanian actress (The Mill of Good Luck, Mihail, câine de circ), COVID-19.
- Stewart Greenleaf, 81, American politician, member of the Pennsylvania House of Representatives (1977–1978) and Senate (1979–2019).
- Jean Grossholtz, 91, American women's studies professor.
- John Hora, 80, American cinematographer (Twilight Zone: The Movie, Gremlins, Explorers), heart failure.
- Ivan Izquierdo, 83, Argentine-born Brazilian neurobiologist, pneumonia.
- Rajiv Kapoor, 58, Indian actor (Ram Teri Ganga Maili, Aasmaan, Hum To Chale Pardes), heart attack.
- Rosemary Karuga, 92, Kenyan visual artist.
- Josef Kolmaš, 87, Czech sinologist and tibetologist.
- Ebbe Kops, 91, Danish Olympic boxer (1952).
- Donald Kouri, 82, American physicist.
- Franco Marini, 87, Italian politician, president of the senate (2006–2008), minister of labour (1991–1992) and MP (1992–2013), COVID-19.
- Prince McJunkins, 60, American football player (Ottawa Rough Riders), complications from COVID-19.
- Baldev Raj Nayar, 89, Indian-born Canadian political scientist, cancer.
- Jean-Charles Perazzi, 84, French writer and journalist.
- Christy Ryan, 63, Irish Gaelic footballer and hurler (St Finbarr's, Cork County).
- Yisa Sofoluwe, 53, Nigerian footballer (Abiola Babes, national team), COVID-19.
- Ghédalia Tazartès, 73, French musician.
- Diógenes Vergara, 50, Panamanian politician, deputy (2014–2019), shot.

=== 10 ===
- Victor Ambrus, 85, Hungarian-born British illustrator.
- Maite Axiari, 71–72, French feminist activist and cultural activist.
- Gertrūda Benze, 87, German-born Lithuanian linguist and doctor.
- Bruce Berger, 82, American writer, poet and pianist, lung disease.
- Dick Bunt, 91, American basketball player (New York Knicks, Baltimore Bullets).
- James Celebrezze, 83, American politician and jurist, member of the Ohio House of Representatives (1967–1974) and justice of the Supreme Court of Ohio (1983–1985).
- Billy Conigliaro, 73, American baseball player (Boston Red Sox, Milwaukee Brewers, Oakland Athletics).
- Alberto Corazón, 79, Spanish graphic designer and artist.
- Katherine Creag, 47, American newscaster (WNYW, WNBC).
- Edward W. Crosby, 88, American professor and academic administrator.
- Dai Davies, 72, Welsh footballer (Wrexham, Everton, national team), pancreatic cancer.
- Goran Daničić, 58, Serbian actor (The Meeting Point, The Robbery of the Third Reich, When I Grow Up, I'll Be a Kangaroo).
- Larry Flynt, 78, American publisher (Hustler), founder of Larry Flynt Publications, heart failure.
- Fanne Foxe, 84, Argentine-born American stripper.
- Tamaz V. Gamkrelidze, 91, Georgian linguist and Hittitologist, president of the Georgian National Academy of Sciences (2005–2013).
- Ibrahim Othman Ibrahim Idris, 60, Sudanese ex-detainee (Guantanamo Bay).
- Maurizio Liverani, 92, Italian film director (Il solco di pesca), screenwriter and journalist, heart attack.
- Jorge Morel, 89, Argentine classical guitarist and composer.
- Ebba Nørager, 93, Danish actress.
- Benjamin Orenstein, 94, Polish-born French Holocaust survivor and lecturer.
- Egil Øyjord, 92, Norwegian engineer.
- Pachín, 82, Spanish football player (Real Madrid, national team) and manager (Hércules).
- Heinz Schuster-Šewc, 94, German Sorbian Slavic scholar.
- Tim Selwood, 76, English cricketer (Middlesex, Central Districts).
- Lee Sexton, 92, American banjo player.
- Zainul Haque Sikder, 90, Bangladeshi businessman, founder of the Sikder Group, COVID-19.
- Takao Suzuki, 94, Japanese sociolinguist.
- Luc Versteylen, 93, Belgian Jesuit priest, founder of Agalev, COVID-19.
- Taavo Virkhaus, 86, Estonian-American conductor and composer, COVID-19.
- Mack Walker, 91, American historian, COVID-19.

=== 11 ===
- L. Desaix Anderson, 84, American diplomat, chargé d'affaires ad interim to Vietnam (1995–1997).
- Lila Oliver Asher, 99, American artist, complications following surgery.
- George Benneh, 86, Ghanaian academic administrator and politician, minister of finance (1981) and vice-chancellor of the University of Ghana (1992–1996).
- Beth Bentley, 99, American poet.
- S. Prestley Blake, 106, American restaurateur, co-founder of Friendly's.
- Richard Bracken, 90, American film editor (Swamp Thing, Rich Man, Poor Man, Power Rangers), kidney failure.
- Rusty Brooks, 63, American professional wrestler (IWCCW, WWF, FOW).
- Teresa Burga, 86, Peruvian artist.
- Jacques Crickillon, 80, Belgian writer.
- Bukhari Daud, 61, Indonesian academic and politician, regent of Aceh Besar (2007–2012).
- Pierre-Guillaume de Roux, 57, French editor.
- Charles Passmore Graham, 93, American lieutenant general.
- Mary Matsuda Gruenewald, 96, American writer, pneumonia.
- Wynn Hawkins, 84, American baseball player (Cleveland Indians).
- Phil Horrocks-Taylor, 86, English rugby union player (Leicester Tigers, British & Irish Lions, national team).
- Noboru Ishiguro, 88, Japanese Olympic racewalker (1964).
- Lateef Jakande, 91, Nigerian journalist and politician, governor of Lagos State (1979–1983) and minister of works (1993–1998).
- John James, 72, English footballer (Port Vale, Chester City, Tranmere Rovers).
- Antonis Kalogiannis, 80, Greek singer, heart attack.
- Maria Kastrisianaki, 72, Greek broadcaster, cancer. (death announced on this date)
- John Kirkham, 79, English footballer (Wolverhampton Wanderers, Peterborough United, Exeter City).
- Stan LePard, 64, American video game music orchestrator (Halo, Destiny, Guild Wars 2), intracerebral hemorrhage.
- Reg Lewis, 85, American bodybuilder and actor (Sextette).
- Abu Sujak Mahmud, 82, Malaysian politician, Selangor MLA (1986–1999) and mayor of Shah Alam (2000–2002).
- Marcelino da Mata, 80, Portuguese army officer, COVID-19.
- Frank Mills, 93, British actor (Coronation Street).
- Rowena Morrill, 76, American fantasy illustrator.
- Javier Neves, 67, Peruvian lawyer and academic, minister of Labour and Promotion of Employment (2004–2005), COVID-19.
- Fritz Obersiebrasse, 80, German Olympic sprinter.
- Robert E. Pearlman, 81, American explorer, complications from lung cancer.
- Arlene Pieper, 90, American runner.
- Afzalur Rahman, 78, Indian politician, Assam MLA (1978–2011).
- Rubén Alfonso Ramírez, 84, Guatemalan television presenter and politician, minister of education (2015–2016).
- Leslie E. Robertson, 92, American structural engineer (World Trade Center, Shanghai World Financial Center, Bank of China Tower), blood cancer.
- Jayalal Rohana, 56, Sri Lankan actor (Tikiri Suwanda, Sinhawalokanaya, Nidahase Piya DS) and screenwriter, complications from a heart attack.
- Pat Russell, 97, American politician, member (1969–1987) and president (1983–1987) of the Los Angeles City Council.
- Isadore Singer, 96, American mathematician (Atiyah–Singer index theorem), Abel Prize winner (2004).
- Eli Soriano, 73, Filipino televangelist (Ang Dating Daan).
- Philip A. Stadter, 84, American scholar of Greek historiography.
- Mladen Vranković, 83, Croatian football player (HNK Rijeka, Kansas City Spurs) and manager (NK Orijent).
- Michael J. Weber, 78, American research scientist, pancreatic cancer.
- Joan Weldon, 90, American actress (Them!, Gunsight Ridge, Day of the Badman).

=== 12 ===
- Mahamed Abdiqadir, Somali royal, grand sultan of Isaaq (since 1975).
- Gianni Beschin, 67, Italian football referee.
- Tom Bethell, 84, British-born American music journalist and author, complications from Parkinson's disease.
- Ellen Cheever, 72, American interior designer and kitchen historian.
- William Chervy, 83, French politician, senator (1981–1998).
- Chris Conn, 83, British Grand Prix motorcycle road racer, heart attack.
- Marcia Diamond, 95, Canadian actress (Deranged, Black Christmas, Spy Games).
- Antonio Giménez-Rico, 82, Spanish film director (Retrato de Familia, Jarrapellejos, The Disputed Vote of Mr. Cayo) and screenwriter, COVID-19.
- Milford Graves, 79, American jazz drummer (New York Art Quartet), heart failure.
- Roger Griffin, 85, British astronomer.
- Celso Güity, 63, Honduran footballer (Marathón, Sula, national team), cancer.
- Zdeněk Hoření, 91, Czech journalist and politician, editor-in-chief of Rudé právo (1983–1989), member of the CSFR (1976–1986) and the CNR (1986–1990), pneumonia and COVID-19.
- Paolo Isotta, 70, Italian musicologist and writer.
- Norman Jukes, 88, English footballer (York City).
- Tohami Khaled, Libyan military officer, head of the Internal Security Agency, COVID-19.
- Maurizio Mattei, 78, Italian football referee, COVID-19.
- Atashasta Justus Nditiye, 51, Tanzanian politician, MP (since 2015), traffic collision.
- Rupert Neve, 94, British electronics engineer (Neve Electronics), pneumonia and heart failure.
- Bernard Nsayi, 78, Congolese Roman Catholic prelate, bishop of Nkayi (1990–2001).
- Christopher Pennock, 76, American actor (Dark Shadows, General Hospital, Guiding Light).
- Frederick K. C. Price, 89, American televangelist, founder of the Crenshaw Christian Center, COVID-19.
- Prie GS, 56, Indonesian journalist (Suara Merdeka), cartoonist, and radio and television host, heart attack.
- Paavo Pystynen, 89, Finnish Olympic long-distance runner (1964).
- Helen Rae, 83, American artist.
- Fujie Sakamoto, 97, Japanese nurse and midwife.
- Eunice Sato, 99, American politician, mayor of Long Beach (1980–1982).
- Tom Scullion, 81, Irish Gaelic footballer (Bellaghy, Derry).
- John Palmer, 4th Earl of Selborne, 80, British peer and businessman, member of the House of Lords (1971–2020).
- Simon Sheppard, 72, American writer and activist, kidney cancer.
- Lynn Stalmaster, 93, American casting director (Judgment at Nuremberg, Deliverance, Superman).
- Russ Thyret, 76, American music executive, chairman and CEO of Warner Bros. Records (1995–2001).
- Richard Tomita, 93, American Olympic weightlifter (1948).
- Pavel Vácha, 80, Czech photographer.
- Carlo Wagner, 67, Luxembourgish politician, deputy (1994–1999, 2004–2013) and minister of health (1999–2004).
- Mary E. Young, 92, American historian.

=== 13 ===
- Xabier Agirre, 69, Spanish politician, member of the Basque Parliament (2004–2005, 2005–2007, 2012–2016).
- Simonetta Bernardi, 81, Italian historian.
- Inger Bjørnbakken, 87, Norwegian alpine skier, world champion (1958), fire.
- Pat Bond, 94, American BDSM activist, founder of The Eulenspiegel Society, congestive heart failure.
- Louis Clark, 73, English musical arranger (Electric Light Orchestra, Hooked on Classics), conductor, and keyboardist.
- Peter G. Davis, 84, American music critic.
- Sydney Devine, 81, Scottish singer.
- Marco Dimitri, 58, Italian Satanist, heart attack.
- Jonathan Edewor, 78, Nigerian Anglican prelate, bishop of Oleh (1999–2012).
- Bud Estes, 74, American politician, member of the Kansas House of Representatives (2014–2017) and Senate (since 2017), mayor of Bucklin (1976–1990).
- Urs Jaeggi, 89, Swiss sociologist, painter, and author.
- Franz Jalics, 93, Hungarian Roman Catholic Jesuit priest and theologian, COVID-19.
- Bolesław Kwiatkowski, 78, Polish Olympic basketball player (1968).
- George Mandel, 101, American Beat writer.
- Helen Meier, 91, Swiss writer.
- Dave Nalle, 61, American political writer, game author and font designer, COVID-19.
- Masashige Narusawa, 96, Japanese film director and screenwriter (The Woman in the Rumor, Street of Shame).
- Olle Nygren, 91, Swedish speedway rider, COVID-19.
- Alberto Oliart, 92, Spanish politician, minister of defence (1981–1982) and chairman of RTVE (2009–2011), COVID-19.
- Frank Orr, 84, Canadian Hall of Fame sports journalist (Toronto Star).
- Andon Qesari, 78, Albanian actor and stage director.
- James Ridgeway, 84, American investigative journalist (The Village Voice, The New Republic, The Wall Street Journal).
- Enrique Rodríguez Galindo, 82, Spanish anti-ETA Civil Guard and convicted state terrorist (GAL), COVID-19.
- Emanuel Rubin, 92, American pathologist.
- Sinyo Harry Sarundajang, 76, Indonesian politician, mayor of Bitung (1991–2000), governor of North Sulawesi (2005–2015) and ambassador to the Philippines (since 2018).
- Raymond Specht, 96, Australian plant ecologist.
- Kadir Topbaş, 76, Turkish politician, mayor of Beyoğlu (1999–2004) and Istanbul (2004–2017), complications from COVID-19.
- Ansley Truitt, 70, American basketball player (Dallas Chaparrals, Crispa Redmanizers), COVID-19.
- Max Vernon, 85, British police officer and hostage negotiator (Balcombe Street siege, Iranian Embassy siege), pneumonia complicated by COVID-19.
- Yury Vlasov, 85, Russian writer and weightlifter, Olympic champion (1960).
- Françoise Winnik, 68, French-born Canadian chemist and researcher.
- Pavel Winternitz, 84, Czech-born Canadian mathematical physicist.
- Alan Woan, 90, English footballer (Northampton Town, Crystal Palace, Aldershot).

=== 14 ===
- Jody Alderson, 85, American swimmer, Olympic bronze medalist (1952).
- Blanca Álvarez González, 63, Spanish journalist, writer and poet, multiple organ failure.
- Mourid Barghouti, 76, Palestinian poet and writer (I Saw Ramallah).
- Catherine Belsey, 80, British literary critic and academic, stroke.
- William M. Boothby, 102, American mathematician.
- Jacqueline Donny, 93, French beauty pageant contestant, Miss France (1948), Miss Europe (1948).
- Constance Fozzard, 88, English obstetrician and gynecologist.
- Hywel Francis, 74, Welsh politician, MP (2001–2015) and chair of the Joint Committee on Human Rights (2010–2015), cancer.
- Robert R. Glauber, 81, American academic, pancreatic cancer.
- Ari Gold, 47, American singer-songwriter, leukemia.
- Ulla Johansen, 93, Estonian-German ethnologist.
- Serhii Kamyshev, 64, Ukrainian diplomat, ambassador to China (2004–2009, since 2019), heart attack.
- Finn Knutsen, 88, Norwegian politician, MP (1985–1989).
- Berta Berkovich Kohút, 99, Czechoslovak-born American Holocaust survivor, complications from COVID-19.
- Nevenka Koprivšek, 61, Slovenian actress and theatrical producer.
- Christopher Lee, 79, British writer (This Sceptred Isle) and historian, COVID-19.
- W. J. M. Lokubandara, 79, Sri Lankan politician, member (1977–2010) and speaker (2004–2010) of the Parliament and governor of Sabaragamuwa Province (2010–2015), COVID-19.
- Sir William Macpherson, 94, Scottish jurist, High Court judge (1983–1996), hereditary chief of Clan Macpherson (since 1969).
- Audrey Meaney, 89, English-Australian archaeologist and historian.
- Carlos Menem, 90, Argentine politician, president (1989–1999), senator (since 2005) and governor of La Rioja Province (1973–1976, 1983–1989), complications from urinary tract infection.
- Michael Menaker, 86, Austrian-born American chronobiologist.
- William Meninger, 88, American Trappist monk.
- Doug Mountjoy, 78, Welsh snooker player.
- Nguyễn Tài Thu, 89, Vietnamese physician.
- Ion Mihai Pacepa, 92, Romanian intelligence officer and defector, COVID-19.
- Iain Pattinson, 67, British screenwriter, leukemia.
- Jean Roulland, 89, French sculptor.
- Syarifudin Tippe, 67, Indonesian military officer, rector of the Defence University (2011–2012).
- Hylke Tromp, 85, Dutch polemologist.
- Pilar Unzalu, 63, Spanish politician, member of the Basque Parliament (2000–2004) and deputy (2008–2009).
- Lorenzo Washington, 34, American football player (Alabama Crimson Tide, New England Patriots).
- Zachary Wohlman, 32, American boxer.

=== 15 ===
- Werner Aderhold, 83, German musicologist.
- Kōjirō Akagi, 87, Japanese painter.
- Andreas Apostolopoulos, 69, Greek-Canadian real estate developer.
- Tito Arecchi, 87, Italian physicist, fall.
- Steuart Bedford, 81, English conductor and pianist.
- Florence Birdwell, 96, American educator, musician and singer.
- Doris Bunte, 87, American politician, member of the Massachusetts House of Representatives (1973–1984), cancer.
- Dame Fiona Caldicott, 80, British psychiatrist and academic administrator, principal of Somerville College, Oxford (1996–2010).
- Alberto Canapino, 57, Argentine racing car engineer, COVID-19.
- Gilles Capelle, 71, French Olympic field hockey player.
- Ed Coil, 89, American basketball executive (Detroit Pistons).
- Sandro Dori, 82, Italian actor (Be Sick... It's Free, Il Prof. Dott. Guido Tersilli, primario della clinica Villa Celeste, convenzionata con le mutue) and voice actor.
- Jimmy Evans, 81, American politician, attorney general of Alabama (1991–1995), complications from pneumonia and heart attack.
- Lucien Gourong, 77, French writer, singer, and storyteller, COVID-19.
- Lucía Guilmáin, 83, Mexican actress (Las fuerzas vivas, Length of War, Darker Than Night), COVID-19.
- Andréa Guiot, 93, French operatic soprano, COVID-19.
- George Hart, 75, British Egyptologist.
- Gerard Hemsworth, 75, British artist.
- Richard H. Holm, 87, American chemist.
- Vincent Jackson, 38, American football player (San Diego Chargers, Tampa Bay Buccaneers).
- Nechan Karakéhéyan, 88, Greek-born Armenian Catholic hierarch, ordinary of Eastern Europe (2005–2010) and Greece (1991–2000), eparch of Ishafan (2001–2003).
- Golnoush Khaleghi, 80, Iranian music researcher, composer, and arranger.
- Derek Khan, 63, Trinidadian-American fashion stylist, COVID-19.
- Muhammed Seif Khatib, 70, Tanzanian politician, MP (1995–2015).
- Raymond Lévesque, 92, Canadian singer-songwriter, poet, and actor (Bernie and the Gang), COVID-19.
- Leopoldo Luque, 71, Argentine footballer (River Plate, Unión, national team), world champion (1978), COVID-19.
- Kenny McDevitt, 91, English footballer (Tranmere Rovers).
- Gideon Meir, 74, Israeli diplomat, ambassador to Italy and Malta (2006–2011), cancer.
- Zdzisław Najder, 90, Polish literary critic, historian and political activist.
- John Oyioka, Kenyan politician, MP (2017–2021).
- Johnny Pacheco, 85, Dominican-American musician (Fania All-Stars) and label executive (Fania Records), complications from pneumonia.
- José Pedrozo, 38, Paraguayan footballer (Antofagasta, San Marcos de Arica), traffic collision.
- Gregorio Américo Pérez Valdés, 79, Cuban baseball player, prostate cancer.
- Eva Maria Pracht, 83, German-Canadian equestrian, Olympic bronze medalist (1988), COVID-19.
- Jalaluddin Rakhmat, 71, Indonesian politician, MP (2014–2019), COVID-19.
- Lilia Quindoza Santiago, 72, Filipino writer and academic.
- P. B. Sawant, 90, Indian jurist, judge of the Supreme Court (1989–1995), cardiac arrest.
- Rowsch Shaways, 74, Iraqi politician, prime minister of Kurdistan Region (1996–1999) and vice president (2004–2005).
- Arne Sorenson, 62, American hotel executive, president and CEO of Marriott International (since 2012), pancreatic cancer.
- Andreas Teuber, 78, American academic and actor (Doctor Faustus).
- Ștefan Tudor, 77, Romanian rower, Olympic bronze medallist (1972).
- István Turu, 58, Hungarian Olympic boxer (1988), COVID-19.
- Betty Willingale, 93, British television producer and script editor.
- Rhea Woltman, 92, American pilot (Mercury 13).

=== 16 ===
- José Álvarez de Paz, 85, Spanish politician, deputy (1979–1987) and MEP (1986–1995) and civil governor of Pontevedra province (1994–1996).
- Irit Amiel, 89, Polish writer and poet.
- Jason Benjamin, 50, Australian artist.
- James Bishop, 93, American painter.
- Carman, 65, American Christian singer, complications from hiatal hernia surgery.
- Otakar Černý, 77, Czech sports journalist and television presenter.
- Doğan Cüceloğlu, 83, Turkish psychologist, aortic dissection.
- Trevor Dannatt, 101, British architect (Royal Festival Hall).
- Don Dietrich, 59, Canadian ice hockey player (Chicago Blackhawks, New Jersey Devils), complications from cancer and Parkinson's disease.
- Niki Erlenmeyer-Kimling, 88, American psychiatric geneticist.
- Wayne Giardino, 77, Canadian football player (Ottawa Rough Riders).
- Werner Grobholz, 78, German violinist.
- Jeong Gyeong-mo, 96, South Korean writer and reunification activist
- Rama Jois, 89, Indian politician and jurist, governor of Jharkhand (2002–2003) and Bihar (2003–2004), chief justice of the Punjab and Haryana High Court (1992), heart attack.
- John F. Kordek, 82, American diplomat.
- Lew Krausse Jr., 77, American baseball player (Milwaukee Brewers, Boston Red Sox, St. Louis Cardinals), cancer.
- Agnes Lange, 91, German politician, member of the Bürgerschaft of Bremen (1984–1991).
- Bernard Lown, 99, Lithuanian-born American inventor and cardiologist, developer of the defibrillator, pneumonia and heart failure.
- Muhammad Arshad Malik, 72, Pakistani Olympic weightlifter.
- Ángel Mangual, 73, Puerto Rican baseball player (Oakland Athletics, Pittsburgh Pirates), World Series champion (1972, 1973, 1974).
- Joan Margarit, 82, Spanish poet, Miguel de Cervantes Prize winner (2019), cancer.
- Maïté Mathieu, 92, French political activist and feminist.
- Jessica McClintock, 90, American fashion designer.
- Gustavo Noboa, 83, Ecuadorian politician, president (2000–2003) and vice president (1998–2000), governor of Guayas Province (1983–1984), heart attack.
- Wayne Nunnely, 68, American college football coach (UNLV Rebels, San Diego Chargers, Denver Broncos) and player (UNLV).
- Atsutada Otaka, 76, Japanese composer.
- Saw Swee Hock, 89, Singaporean mathematician and philanthropist.
- Jan Sokol, 84, Czech philosopher and politician, MP (1990–1992) and minister of education, youth and sports (1998), Charter 77 signatory.
- Claudio Sorrentino, 75, Italian voice actor and dubbing director, COVID-19.
- Soul Jah Love, 31, Zimbabwean reggae singer.
- Si Spencer, 59, British comic book writer (Books of Magick: Life During Wartime, The Vinyl Underground).
- Yusriansyah Syarkawi, 70, Indonesian politician, regent of Paser (1999–2004, since 2016).
- Tonton David, 53, French reggae singer, stroke.
- Sleiman Traboulsi, Lebanese politician and magistrate, minister of electrical and water resources (1998–2000).
- Michel Vuillermet, 70, French film director.

=== 17 ===
- Oscar Albarado, 72, American boxer, WBA/WBC super welterweight champion (1974–1975).
- Özcan Arkoç, 81, Turkish footballer (Hamburger SV, Beşiktaş, national team).
- Françoise Cactus, 56, French musician (Stereo Total) and author, breast cancer.
- Jacinto Cayco, 96, Filipino Olympic swimmer (1948).
- Carlos Chacón Galindo, 86, Peruvian politician, provincial mayor of Cusco Province (1967–1969, 1987–1989).
- Raffaele Cutolo, 79, Italian mobster, founder of the Nuova Camorra Organizzata, pneumonia.
- Darius Elias, 48, Canadian politician, Yukon MLA (2006–2016).
- Marc Ellington, 75, American-born Scottish folk-rock singer-songwriter, musician and conservationist.
- Edwin A. Fleishman, 93, American psychologist.
- Francis B. Francois, 87, American engineer.
- Jan Geersing, 80, Dutch politician, mayor of Ferwerderadiel (1988–2001).
- Seif Sharif Hamad, 77, Tanzanian politician, vice president (2010–2016, since 2020) and chief minister of Zanzibar (1984–1988), COVID-19.
- Frances Harris, 71, Australian-born British historian.
- Mary Holt, 96, British politician, MP (1970–1974).
- Ali Hossain, 80, Bangladeshi composer.
- Henry B. Heller, 79, American politician, member of the Maryland House of Delegates (1987–2011).
- Iraj Kaboli, 82, Iranian writer, linguist and translator.
- Sir Eddie Kulukundis, 88, British shipping magnate and philanthropist.
- Rush Limbaugh, 70, American Hall of Fame radio host (The Rush Limbaugh Show), author, and political commentator, complications from lung cancer.
- Andrea Lo Vecchio, 78, Italian composer, lyricist and record producer, COVID-19.
- Francisco Luzón, 73, Spanish banker, complications from amyotrophic lateral sclerosis.
- John Manning, 80, English footballer (Tranmere Rovers, Barnsley).
- Christine McHorse, 72, American ceramics artist, COVID-19.
- Omar Moreno Palacios, 82, Argentine folk singer-songwriter, guitarist and gaucho, encephalitis.
- Joseph Pastor Neelankavil, 90, Indian Syro-Malabar Catholic hierarch, eparch of Sagar (1987–2006).
- Sanjaya Rajaram, 78, Indian-born Mexican scientist, COVID-19.
- John K. Rafferty, 82, American politician, member of the New Jersey General Assembly (1986–1988), mayor of Hamilton Township (1976–1999).
- Vasco do Rego, 96, Indian Jesuit priest.
- Mike Renshaw, 72, English-born American soccer player (Rhyl, Dallas Tornado, United States national team).
- Sir Derek Roberts, 88, British engineer and academic administrator, provost of University College London.
- René Roemersma, 62, Dutch activist.
- Donald P. Ryder, 94, American architect.
- Gianluigi Saccaro, 82, Italian fencer, Olympic champion (1960).
- Tetsurō Sagawa, 84, Japanese actor, complications from amyotrophic lateral sclerosis.
- Luna Shamsuddoha, 67, Bangladeshi software and banking executive, chairman of Janata Bank (since 2018).
- Satish Sharma, 73, Indian politician, MP (1991–1998, 1998–2004, 2010–2016), minister of petroleum and natural gas (1993–1996).
- Naomi Shelton, 78, American musician.
- Martha Stewart, 98, American actress (Doll Face, Johnny Comes Flying Home, Are You with It?) and singer.
- Gene Summers, 82, American rockabilly singer, complications from an injury sustained at home.
- Humphrey Taylor, 82, English Anglican clergyman, bishop of Selby (1991–2003).
- U-Roy, 78, Jamaican reggae singer.
- Martí Vergés, 86, Spanish footballer (España Industrial, Barcelona, national team).
- Mufwankolo Wa Lesa, 85, Congolese humorist and theatre director.
- Murray Weideman, 85, Australian football player (Collingwood, Victoria) and coach.
- Nancy Worden, 66, American artist and metalsmith, complications from amyotrophic lateral sclerosis.
- Jyrki Yrttiaho, 68, Finnish politician, MP (2007–2015).
- Avetis Zenyan, 85, Russian cinematographer.

=== 18 ===
- Amīr Aṣlān Afshār, 101, Iranian diplomat, ambassador to West Germany (1973–1977) and the U.S. (1969–1972), COVID-19.
- Luis Balagué, 76, Spanish road bicycle racer.
- Balanchine, 30, American Thoroughbred racehorse, Epsom Oaks and Irish Derby winner (1994).
- Vittore Bocchetta, 102, Italian sculptor, painter and academic.
- Alan Curtis, 90, British actor (Carry On Henry, Doctor Who, Four Dimensions of Greta).
- Thomas Dann, 40, English cricketer.
- Abdullahi Dikko, 60, Nigerian government official.
- Mark van Drumpt, Dutch sports physiotherapist (Garryowen, Limerick), cancer.
- Graeme English, 56, British Olympic freestyle wrestler (1988).
- Patricia Fargnoli, 83, American poet and psychotherapist.
- Wolf-Peter Funk, 77, German-born Canadian religious historian.
- Ketty Fusco, 94, Swiss-Italian actress, director and writer.
- Hans-Werner Grosse, 98, German glider pilot.
- Sergo Karapetyan, 72, Armenian politician, minister of agriculture (2010–2016), COVID-19.
- Mushahid Ullah Khan, 68, Pakistani politician, senator (since 2009) and minister of climate change (2015, 2017–2018).
- Isaac Thomas Kottukapally, 72, Indian film score composer (Swaham, Thaayi Saheba, Adaminte Makan Abu).
- Carol LaBrie, 74, American model.
- Frank Lupo, 66, American television writer and producer (The A-Team, Wiseguy, Walker, Texas Ranger).
- Jan Mans, 80, Dutch politician, mayor of Meerssen (1982–1989), Kerkrade (1989–1994), and Enschede (1994–2005).
- Farouk Muhammad, 71, Indonesian police officer and politician, senator (2009–2019).
- Andrey Myagkov, 82, Russian actor (The Irony of Fate, Office Romance, A Cruel Romance), People's Artist of the RSFSR (1986), heart attack.
- Leslie Osterman, 73, American politician, member of the Kansas House of Representatives (2011–2019).
- Juan Pizarro, 84, Puerto Rican baseball player (Milwaukee Braves, Chicago White Sox), cancer.
- Prince Markie Dee, 52, American rapper (The Fat Boys), heart failure.
- Bill Ramseyer, 84, American football player, coach and administrator.
- John Roach, 87, American football player (Green Bay Packers).
- Nikolina Ruseva, 77, Bulgarian Olympic sprint canoeist.
- Yehoshua Sagi, 87, Israeli intelligence officer and politician, director of the Military Intelligence Directorate (1979–1983) and member of the Knesset (1988–1992).
- Kristofer Schipper, 86, Dutch sinologist.
- John Spencer, 74, Australian rugby league player (Balmain, New South Wales).
- Guido Stagnaro, 96, Italian film director (I cinque del quinto piano) and screenwriter (In Love, Every Pleasure Has Its Pain), co-creator of Topo Gigio, COVID-19.
- Chris Vincent, 86, British motorcycle sidecar road racer.
- Jack Vivian, 79, Canadian ice hockey coach (Bowling Green Falcons, Cleveland Crusaders).
- Donald C. Wintersheimer, 89, American jurist, justice of the Kentucky Supreme Court (1983–2007).
- Leonid Yachmenyov, 83, Russian basketball coach (WBC Dynamo Novosibirsk, women's national team).

=== 19 ===
- Faisal Abdulaziz, 53, Bahraini footballer (Muharraq, national team).
- Luigi Albertelli, 86, Italian songwriter ("Zingara") and television author, complications from a fall.
- Ebba Andersson, 85, Swedish footballer (Öxabäcks, national team).
- Đorđe Balašević, 67, Serbian singer-songwriter (Rani Mraz), COVID-19.
- Michel Bernard, 88, French politician, deputy (1986–1988).
- Philippe Chatel, 72, French singer-songwriter, heart attack.
- Bobby Lee Cook, 94, American lawyer (Wayne Williams, Bobby Hoppe, Jake Butcher).
- Kenneth Davey, 88, English academic.
- Arthur Dial, 90, American painter and sculptor.
- Arturo Di Modica, 80, Italian-American sculptor (Charging Bull), cancer.
- Louise Munro Foley, 87, Canadian-born American writer.
- Lawrence Otis Graham, 59, American attorney and author.
- Rupert Hambro, 77, British banker, businessman and philanthropist.
- Jocelyn Hardy, 75, Canadian ice hockey player (California Golden Seals, Cleveland Crusaders) and coach (Shawinigan Cataractes), complications from a heart attack.
- Frank Judge, 74, American translator and poet.
- Joseph Kesenge Wandangakongu, 92, Congolese Roman Catholic prelate, bishop of Molegbe (1968–1997).
- Ludvík Liška, 91, Czech Olympic middle-distance runner (1952).
- Liu Fusheng, 89, Chinese politician, delegate to the National People's Congress (1975–1978, 1988–1998).
- Calixto Malcom, 73–74, Panamanian jurist and Olympic basketball player (1968).
- Fousiya Mampatta, 52, Indian football player and manager, cancer.
- Leonard Martino, 95, American politician, member of the Pennsylvania House of Representatives (1969–1974).
- Adolf Mathis, 83, Swiss Olympic alpine skier (1960, 1964).
- Ioannis Mazarakis-Ainian, 98, Greek army officer and historian.
- Mya Thwe Thwe Khine, 20, Burmese protester (2021–2022 Myanmar protests), complications from gunshot wounds.
- Tayseer Najjar, 46, Jordanian journalist, heart disease.
- Clotilde Niragira, 52–53, Burundian politician and lawyer, minister of justice (2005–2007), stroke.
- Dianna Ortiz, 62, American Roman Catholic nun and anti-torture advocate, cancer.
- Jerold Ottley, 86, American music director and choral conductor, complications from COVID-19.
- Les Pridham, 83, Australian footballer (Essendon).
- Naomi Rosenblum, 96, American photography historian, heart failure.
- Tommy Ross, 93, British Olympic speed skater.
- Silvio Sérafin, 82, French footballer (FC Nancy, Angers SCO, Angoulême-Soyaux Charente).
- LaVannes Squires, 90, American basketball player (Kansas Jayhawks).
- Bill Wright, 84, American golfer.

=== 20 ===
- Chris Ajilo, 91, Nigerian highlife musician.
- I Gede Ardhika, 76, Indonesian politician, minister of culture and tourism (2000–2004).
- Serpil Barlas, 64, Turkish singer.
- Mauro Bellugi, 71, Italian footballer (Inter Milan, Bologna, national team), complications from COVID-19.
- Michael Bowling, 64, American politician.
- Richard Boyd, 78, American philosopher.
- Philippe Brizard, 87, French actor.
- Joe Burke, 81, Irish accordionist.
- Gerald Cardinale, 86, American politician, member of the New Jersey General Assembly (1980–1982) and Senate (since 1982).
- Henri Courtine, 90, French judoka.
- Chris Craft, 81, British racing driver.
- David de Keyser, 93, British actor (On Her Majesty's Secret Service, Diamonds Are Forever, Doctor Who).
- Fredrik Stefan Eaton, 82, Canadian businessman and philanthropist.
- Charlotte Fielden, 88, Canadian novelist.
- Charley Hill, 73, British art crime investigator, complications from heart surgery.
- Bob Hindmarch, 90, Canadian academic and ice hockey coach (UBC Thunderbirds, national team).
- Dean Ho, 88, American professional wrestler (WWWF, PNW, NWA Hawaii), complications from chronic traumatic encephalopathy.
- Halja Klaar, 90, Estonian film artist.
- Alcide M. Lanoue, 86, American military officer, surgeon general of the United States Army (1992–1996).
- Koyya Hassan Manik, 67, Maldivian actor (Hinithun Velaashey Kalaa, Ihsaas, Bos) and producer, COVID-19.
- Nurul Haque Miah, 76, Bangladeshi chemist.
- Jean-Yves Moyart, 53, French criminal lawyer and blogger.
- Yemane Niguse, Ethiopian politician and Tigray activist, assassinated.
- Rosamond Asiamah Nkansah, 91, Ghanaian police officer, first woman recruited into the Ghanaian force.
- Maurice Pelé, 92, French road racing cyclist.
- A. T. M. Shamsuzzaman, 79, Bangladeshi actor (Surja Dighal Bari, Hajar Bachhor Dhore) and playwright.
- Richard Shephard, 71, British composer and headmaster.
- Yuri Shvachkin, 90, Russian chemist.
- Gene Taylor, 68, American pianist (Canned Heat, The Blasters, The Fabulous Thunderbirds).
- Nicola Tempesta, 85, Italian Olympic judoka (1964, 1972).
- Wai Yan Tun, 16, Burmese protester, shot.
- Douglas Turner Ward, 90, American playwright and actor (The River Niger), co-founder of the Negro Ensemble Company.
- Stan Williams, 84, American baseball player (Los Angeles Dodgers, Cleveland Indians) and coach (Cincinnati Reds).

=== 21 ===
- Mireya Arboleda, 92, Colombian classical pianist.
- Rod Arrants, 76, American actor (Search for Tomorrow, Days of Our Lives, Rent).
- Brian Brennan, 77, Irish-born Canadian author and historian.
- Christopher Cardozo, 72, American art collector, photographer and publisher, stroke.
- Arthur Cook, 92, American sports shooter, Olympic champion (1948).
- Kevin Dann, 62, Australian rugby league player (Penrith Panthers, New South Wales).
- Isabelle Dhordain, 62, French journalist.
- Patricia Drennan, 87, British cartoonist and illustrator, lung cancer.
- André Dufraisse, 94, French racing cyclist, world cyclo-cross champion (1954–1958).
- Barbara Field, 87, American playwright, complications from a stroke.
- Dick Geary, 75, British historian.
- Charlie Gorin, 93, American baseball player (Milwaukee Braves).
- Katie Hurley, 99, American politician, member of the Alaska House of Representatives (1985–1987).
- Judy Irola, 77, American cinematographer (Northern Lights, Working Girls), complications from COVID-19.
- Giovanni Knapp, 77, Italian racing cyclist, complications from a fall.
- Mike Law, 78, Canadian football player (Edmonton Eskimos).
- Shane Lewis, 47, Australian Olympic swimmer (1992).
- Jan Lityński, 75, Polish politician and journalist, deputy (1989–2001).
- Hélène Martin, 92, French singer and songwriter.
- Graeme Nicholson, 84, Canadian philosopher.
- Bernard Njonga, 65, Cameroonian activist and politician.
- Jean-Claude Ruiz, 66, French Olympic boxer.
- Radamés Salazar, 46, Mexican politician, senator (since 2018), COVID-19.
- Hal Santiago, 80, Filipino Illustrator and writer.
- Zlatko Saračević, 59, Croatian handball player and coach, Olympic champion (1996).
- Glynne Thomas, 85, British ice hockey player (Streatham Redskins, Wembley Lions, national team).
- Abdülkadir Topkaç, 67, Turkish astronomer, cancer.
- Geoffrey Ursell, 77, Canadian writer, complications from Parkinson's disease.
- Marc Waelkens, 72, Belgian archaeologist.
- Doug Wilkerson, 73, American football player (Houston Oilers, San Diego Chargers).
- Alexander Zhdanov, 70, Russian actor (The Wind of Travel, Pugachev, Russian Symphony), People's Artist of the RSFSR (1995).

=== 22 ===
- Roy Addison, 82, British Olympic boxer.
- Luca Attanasio, 43, Italian diplomat, ambassador to the Democratic Republic of the Congo (since 2017), shot.
- Sir John Bailey, 92, British lawyer and public servant, HM procurator general and treasury solicitor (1984–1988).
- Seif Bamporiki, Rwandan politician, shot.
- Paul Barber, 85, English bishop.
- Peter J. Barnes III, 64, American politician, member of the New Jersey General Assembly (2007–2014) and Senate (2014–2016).
- Jack Bolton, 79, Scottish footballer (Ipswich Town, Raith Rovers, Dumbarton).
- Georges Bonnet, 101, French writer and poet.
- Paolo Castaldi, 90, Italian composer and essayist.
- Raymond Cauchetier, 101, French photographer, COVID-19.
- Hipólito Chaiña, 67, Peruvian doctor and politician, member of Congress (since 2020), COVID-19.
- Jean Cleymans, 76, Belgian physicist.
- Mohanbhai Sanjibhai Delkar, 58, Indian politician, MP (1989–2009, since 2019).
- Xato de Museros, 88–89, Spanish Valencian pilotari.
- Aleksander Doba, 74, Polish kayaker and adventurer.
- William F. English, 86, American politician.
- Lawrence Ferlinghetti, 101, American poet (A Coney Island of the Mind) and co-founder of City Lights Bookstore, interstitial lung disease.
- Maria Ghezzi, 93, Italian designer (La Settimana Enigmistica) and painter.
- Yekaterina Gradova, 74, Russian actress (Seventeen Moments of Spring, The Meeting Place Cannot Be Changed), stroke.
- Laurindo Guizzardi, 86, Brazilian Roman Catholic prelate, bishop of Bagé (1982–2001) and Foz do Iguaçu (2001–2010).
- Martin Heffernan, 76, Irish Gaelic footballer (Tullamore, Offaly).
- Pairoj Jaisingha, 77, Thai actor (Tears of the Black Tiger).
- Gary Kirkpatrick, 79, American concert pianist.
- Miguel Arsenio Lara Sosa, 68, Mexican politician, member of the Congress of Yucatán (1998–2001), heart attack.
- Lamberto Leonardi, 81, Italian football player (Roma, Juventus) and manager (Salernitana).
- Jean-François Leroux-Dhuys, 86, French writer and historian.
- Liu Zhongshan, 92, Chinese army officer and politician, political commissioner of National University of Defense Technology (1990–1994).
- Richard Marriott, 90, English banker and public administrator, lord lieutenant of the East Riding of Yorkshire (1996–2005).
- Olle Martinsson, 76, Swedish Olympic ski jumper (1964).
- Anis al-Naqqash, 70, Lebanese political activist and guerrilla fighter, COVID-19.
- Benno Ndulu, 71, Tanzanian banker, governor of the Bank of Tanzania (2008–2018).
- Jack Quaid, 88, Irish hurler (Feohanagh-Castlemahon, Limerick).
- Peter Rattray, 62, New Zealand cricketer (Canterbury).
- Consuelo Rodríguez Píriz, 60, Spanish politician, member of the Assembly of Extremadura (since 2011), COVID-19.
- Yalchin Rzazadeh, 74, Azerbaijani pop singer.
- Giancarlo Santi, 81, Italian film director (The Grand Duel, Quando c'era lui... caro lei!).
- Daviz Simango, 57, Mozambican politician, mayor of Beira (since 2003) and leader of the Democratic Movement of Mozambique (since 2009), complications from COVID-19 and diabetes.
- Anant Tare, 67, Indian politician, Maharashtra MLC (2000–2006).
- John Vattanky, 89, Indian Jesuit theologian.
- Philippe Venet, 91, French fashion designer and couturier.
- Thomas Vinciguerra, 57, American journalist (The New York Times, The Wall Street Journal, The New Yorker) and writer.
- Jack Whyte, 80, Scottish-Canadian novelist (The Skystone, The Singing Sword, The Saxon Shore), cancer.
- Dick Witcher, 76, American football player (San Francisco 49ers), liver cancer.

=== 23 ===
- Vojkan Borisavljević, 73, Serbian composer (Hell River, Barking at the Stars).
- Franco Cassano, 77, Italian sociologist and politician, deputy (2013–2018).
- Harry Clark, 88, English footballer (Darlington, Hartlepool United).
- Jerzy Dietl, 93, Polish economist and politician, senator (1989–1991).
- Abdul Qadir Djaelani, 82, Indonesian Islamic preacher and politician, MP (2000–2004).
- P. J. Garvan, 92, Irish hurler.
- Jean Grenet, 81, French politician, deputy (1993–1997, 2002–2012) and mayor of Bayonne (1995–2014).
- Fausto Gresini, 60, Italian Grand Prix motorcycle racer, world champion (1985, 1987) and founder of Gresini Racing, complications from COVID-19.
- Peter Harris, 85, English television director (The Muppet Show, Spitting Image, Bullseye), COVID-19.
- Rafael Gurrea Induráin, 80, Spanish politician, member (1979–2007) and president (2003–2007) of the Parliament of Navarre.
- Herbin Hoyos, 53, Colombian journalist and broadcaster (Cadena SER), COVID-19.
- Gary Inness, 71, Canadian ice hockey player (Washington Capitals, Pittsburgh Penguins, Philadelphia Flyers), dementia.
- Othman Kechrid, 100, Tunisian politician, minister of the interior (1979–1980).
- Rahul Khullar, 68, Indian civil servant, chairman of the Telecom Regulatory Authority of India (2012–2015).
- Tormod Knutsen, 89, Norwegian Nordic combined skier, Olympic champion (1964).
- Syed Abul Maksud, 74, Bangladeshi journalist (Prothom Alo) and writer.
- Margaret Maron, 82, American mystery writer, complications from a stroke.
- Julio Márquez de Prado, 72, Spanish judge, president of the High Court of Justice of Extremadura (2004–2019).
- Yves Martin, 91, Canadian sociologist.
- Juan Masnik, 77, Uruguayan football player (Nacional, national team) and manager (Atlético Marte).
- Art Michalik, 91, American football player (San Francisco 49ers, Pittsburgh Steelers) and professional wrestler.
- Gord Miller, 96, Canadian politician, Ontario MPP (1975–1990).
- Wolfango Montanari, 89, Italian Olympic sprinter (1952).
- Sergiu Natra, 96, Romanian-born Israeli composer.
- Pastoral Pursuits, 20, British Thoroughbred racehorse, July Cup winner (2005).
- Luz María Puente, 97, Mexican pianist.
- Néstor Mario Rapanelli, 91, Argentine economist, businessman (Bunge & Born) and politician, minister of economy (1989).
- Henry D. Sahakian, 84, Iranian-born American businessman, founder of Uni-Mart.
- Geoffrey Scott, 79, American actor (Dynasty, Dark Shadows, Hulk), Parkinson's disease.
- Sealy Hill, 17, Canadian Hall of Fame Thoroughbred racehorse.
- James Sedin, 90, American ice hockey player, Olympic silver medalist (1952).
- František Šedivý, 93, Czech resistance fighter and political prisoner.
- Willy Ta Bi, 21, Ivorian footballer (national team), liver cancer.
- Heinz Hermann Thiele, 79, German transportation and parts executive (Knorr-Bremse, Vossloh) and investor (Lufthansa).
- Frits Veerman, 76, Dutch nuclear espionage whistleblower.
- Bob Witz, 86, American artist and poet.
- Ahmed Zaki Yamani, 90, Saudi Arabian politician, minister of petroleum and mineral resources (1962–1986).

=== 24 ===
- Wolfgang Boettcher, 86, German classical cellist.
- Antonio Catricalà, 69, Italian civil servant and lawyer, secretary of the Council of Ministers (2011–2013), suicide by gunshot.
- Bulantrisna Djelantik, 73, Dutch-born Indonesian Balinese dancer and physician, pancreatic cancer.
- Tom Foley, 74, Irish racehorse trainer (Danoli), cancer.
- Gary Halpin, 55, Irish rugby union player (London Irish, Leinster, national team).
- Philippe Jaccottet, 95, Swiss poet and translator.
- Jocephus, 43, American professional wrestler, congenital heart defect.
- Val Keckin, 83, American football player (San Diego Chargers).
- Ayong Maliksi, 82, Filipino politician, member of the House of Representatives (1998–2001, 2010–2013), governor of Cavite (2001–2010).
- Enda McDonagh, 90, Irish Roman Catholic priest.
- Atsushi Miyagi, 89, Japanese tennis player, U.S. National doubles champion (1955).
- Sylvia Murphy, 89, Canadian singer, COVID-19.
- Alan Robert Murray, 66, American sound editor (Letters from Iwo Jima, American Sniper, Joker), Oscar winner (2007, 2015).
- Dal Orlov, 86, Russian film critic, screenwriter (Leader, Hard to Be a God) and writer.
- Peter Ostroushko, 67, American violinist and mandolinist.
- Ronald Pickup, 80, English actor (Darkest Hour, The Best Exotic Marigold Hotel, The Mission).
- Joseph Ponthus, 42, French writer, cancer.
- Sardool Sikander, 60, Indian folk and pop singer, COVID-19.
- N'Singa Udjuu, 86, Congolese politician, first state commissioner of Zaire (1981–1982).

=== 25 ===
- Art Anderson, 84, American football player (Chicago Bears, Pittsburgh Steelers).
- Mashari Al-Ballam, 49, Kuwaiti actor, COVID-19.
- Peter Beadle, 87, New Zealand artist.
- Albert Bers, 89, Belgian footballer (Sint-Truidense V.V.) and football coach (Belgium women's national team).
- Ivy Bottini, 94, American artist and civil rights activist.
- Arkady Davidowitz, 90, Russian writer and aphorist, cardiac arrest.
- Lorys Davies, 84, Welsh archdeacon.
- Craig Dixon, 94, American Olympic hurdler, bronze medalist (1948).
- Joseph Duffey, 88, American academic, anti-war activist and government official.
- Klaus Emmerich, 92, Austrian journalist, COVID-19.
- Hugh Fate, 91, American politician, member of the Alaska House of Representatives (2001–2005).
- Simone Gad, 73, Belgian-born American artist and actress (Speed).
- John Geddert, 63, American gymnastics coach, suicide by gunshot.
- Manfred Gerstenfeld, 84, Austrian-born Israeli author and economist.
- Andrei Gherman, 79, Moldovan physician, minister of health (2001–2005).
- Peter Gotti, 81, American mobster (Gambino crime family).
- Bede Vincent Heather, 92, Australian Roman Catholic prelate, auxiliary bishop of Sydney (1979–1986) and bishop of Parramatta (1986–1997).
- Zdeněk Herman, 86, Czech physical chemist.
- Darrius Johnson, 48, American football player (Denver Broncos, Kansas City Chiefs), heart failure.
- Jim Johnson, 92, Australian Hall of Fame jockey.
- Rafi Levi, 83, Israeli footballer (Maccabi Tel Aviv, Sydney Hakoah, national team).
- John Mallard, 94, British medical researcher.
- Leroy J. Manor, 100, American Air Force lieutenant general, joint commander of Operation Ivory Coast.
- Muriel Marland-Militello, 77, French politician, deputy (2002–2012).
- Hannu Mikkola, 78, Finnish rally driver, world rally champion (1983), cancer.
- Archibald Mogwe, 99, Botswanan politician and diplomat, minister of foreign affairs (1974–1984).
- Erik Myers, 40, American comedian, actor and writer, traffic collision.
- Vishnunarayanan Namboothiri, 81, Indian poet.
- Andrei Palii, 80, Moldovan agronomist, genetics specialist, member of the Academy of Sciences of Moldova.
- Antoine Pfeiffer, 80, French reformist pastor, president of the Protestant Reformed Church of Alsace and Lorraine (1988–2000).
- Bob Pixel, 44, Ghanaian photographer, complications from COVID-19.
- Yves Ramousse, 93, French Roman Catholic prelate, apostolic vicar of Phnom Penh (1962–1976, 1992–2001) and Battambang (1992–2000), COVID-19.
- Hussein F. Sabbour, 85, Egyptian civil engineer and architect.
- George Sanford, 78, British political scientist.
- Juan Francisco Sarasti Jaramillo, 82, Colombian Roman Catholic prelate, archbishop of Cali (2002–2011), complications from COVID-19.
- Lyndsay Stephen, 69, Australian golfer.
- Finn Sterobo, 87, Danish Olympic footballer.
- Bahjat Suleiman, 72, Syrian general and diplomat, COVID-19.
- Masako Sugaya, 83, Japanese voice actress (Bannertail: The Story of Gray Squirrel, Astro Boy, Ohayō! Spank).
- János Szabó, 83, Hungarian politician, MP (1990–1994) and minister of agriculture (1993–1994).
- Maurice Tanguay, 87, Canadian businessman and sporting director.
- Ton Thie, 76, Dutch footballer (ADO Den Haag, San Francisco Golden Gate Gales).
- Vladimir Zuykov, 86, Russian film animator (Film, Film, Film), artist and illustrator, COVID-19.

=== 26 ===
- Tarhata Alonto-Lucman, 94, Filipino politician, governor of Lanao del Sur (1971–1975).
- Ladislava Bakanic, 96, American Olympic gymnast (1948).
- David Manyok Barac Atem, South Sudanese military officer, COVID-19.
- Patricia Bartley, 103, British codebreaker.
- Jacques Beckers, 87, Dutch-born American astronomer.
- Tarek El-Bishry, 87, Egyptian politician and judge, head of the constitutional review committee (2011), complications from COVID-19.
- Rosmarie Bleuer, 94, Swiss Olympic alpine skier (1948).
- Martin Brauer, 49, German actor.
- Bill C. Davis, 69, American playwright (Mass Appeal) and actor, complications from COVID-19.
- William de Gelsey, 99, Hungarian-British banker and economist.
- Johnny DeFazio, 80, American professional wrestler (WWWF), cancer.
- Noel Elliott, 74, Irish rugby union player (Dolphin, Munster, national team).
- Mo Forte, 73, American football coach (Denver Broncos).
- Ronald Gillespie, 96, Canadian chemistry professor, VSEPR theory model co-developer.
- Irving Grundman, 92, Canadian ice hockey general manager (Montreal Canadiens).
- José Guccione, 69, Argentine politician and physician, deputy (2011–2015), COVID-19.
- Mitsusuke Harada, 92, Japanese-English martial artist.
- Eva Herlitz, 68, German businesswoman and writer.
- Bob James, 68, American rock singer-songwriter (Montrose), stomach ulcer complications. (death announced on this date)
- Aleksandr Klepikov, 70, Russian rower, Olympic champion (1976).
- Philip Ray Martinez, 63, American jurist, judge of the U.S. District Court for Western Texas (since 2002), heart attack.
- Des McAleenan, 53, Irish-American soccer player (Connecticut Wolves) and coach (New York Red Bulls).
- David McCabe, 80, British fashion photographer.
- John Mendenhall, 72, American football player (New York Giants).
- Horacio Moráles, 77, Argentine Olympic footballer (1964).
- Al Naples, 94, American baseball player (St. Louis Browns).
- Lorne Nicolson, 84, Canadian politician.
- Miloš Novák, 68, Czech ice hockey player, 1971 European U19 bronze medalist.
- D. Pandian, 88, Indian politician, MP (1989–1996), sepsis.
- Jean Perrottet, 95, French architect.
- Joel A. Pisano, 71, American jurist, judge of the U.S. District Court for New Jersey (2000–2015).
- Àngel Pla, 91, Spanish-born Andorran wood carver, COVID-19.
- Alfredo Quintana, 32, Cuban-born Portuguese handballer (FC Porto, national team), cardiac arrest.
- Janice Sarich, 62, Canadian politician, Alberta MLA (2008–2015), cancer.
- Anura Senanayake, Sri Lankan police officer and singer, cancer.
- Stan Shaw, 94, British cutler.
- György Snell, 71, Hungarian Roman Catholic prelate, auxiliary bishop of Esztergom–Budapest (since 2014), COVID-19.
- Sir Michael Somare, 84, Papua New Guinean politician, chief minister (1973–1975) and prime minister (1975–1980, 1982–1985, 2002–2010, 2011), pancreatic cancer.
- Ferdinand Vega, 84, Puerto Rican Olympic archer (1972).
- Ryan Vierra, 52, American athlete, cancer.
- Gabriel Zavala, 76, Mexican-born American mariachi musician and teacher, COVID-19.

=== 27 ===
- Nozar Azadi, 82, Iranian comedian and actor.
- Alexander Barinev, 68, Russian ice hockey player (Kristall Saratov, HC Spartak Moscow, VEU Feldkirch).
- Serge Bec, 88, French poet.
- Vilmos Benczik, 75, Hungarian Esperantist.
- Juan Antonio Bolea, 90, Spanish politician, president of the Government of Aragon (1978–1981) and deputy (1977–1979), heart attack.
- Mike Bradner, 83, American politician, member (1967–1977) and speaker (1975–1977) of the Alaska House of Representatives, complications from COVID-19.
- Mike Burns, 84, British-born Irish newscaster (RTÉ News at One, This Week, World Report).
- Rachel Cathoud, 74, Swiss actress (The Porter from Maxim's, The Wonderful Day), COVID-19.
- José Manuel Cortizas, 58, Spanish sports journalist and voice actor, COVID-19.
- Dante Crippa, 83, Italian footballer (Brescia, Juventus, S.P.A.L.), complications from COVID-19.
- Edgar Gillock, 92, American politician, member of the Tennessee Senate (1969–1983).
- Linus Nirmal Gomes, 99, Indian Roman Catholic prelate, bishop of Baruipur (1977–1995).
- Alvils Gulbis, 84, Latvian basketball player (Rīgas ASK, VEF Rīga).
- Patrick Hoguet, 80, French politician, deputy (1993–1997, 2002–2003).
- Kenneth Lamar Holland, 86, American politician and lawyer, member of the U.S. House of Representatives (1975–1983).
- Ferdinand van Ingen, 87, Dutch Germanist.
- Marta Martin Carrera-Ruiz, 80, Cuban-American television personality, (El Gordo y la Flaca), COVID-19.
- Russ Martin, 60, American radio broadcaster (KEGL, KLLI-FM).
- Pascal Monkam, 90, Cameroonian businessman.
- Angel Moraes, 55, American DJ and producer.
- N. K. Sukumaran Nair, 78, Indian environmentalist.
- Ng Man-tat, 69, Hong Kong actor (My Heart Is That Eternal Rose, A Moment of Romance, Shaolin Soccer), liver cancer.
- Louis Nix, 29, American football player (Notre Dame Fighting Irish, Houston Texans), drowned.
- Éva Olsavszky, 91, Hungarian actress.
- Didier Poissant, 97, French Olympic sailor (1956).
- Peter Raedts, 72, Dutch historian, complications from a fall.
- Bill Sanders, 90, American political cartoonist.
- DeWitt Searles, 100, American major general.
- Robert Sommer, 91, American environmental psychologist.
- Mariano Valdés Chávarri, 74, Spanish cardiologist and academic, COVID-19.
- Erica Watson, 48, American actress (Precious, Chi-Raq), comedian and writer, complications from COVID-19.
- Michael Wieck, 92, German violinist and author.

=== 28 ===
- Carlos Alberto Abaunza, 61, Nicaraguan Olympic high jumper.
- Sabah Abdul-Jalil, 69, Iraqi football player (national team) and manager (Al-Naft, Al-Quwa Al-Jawiya), COVID-19.
- Artidjo Alkostar, 72, Indonesian judge, member of the Supreme Court (2000–2018).
- Taslim Azis, 56, Indonesian pesilat and politician, MP (2019).
- Milan Bandić, 65, Croatian politician, mayor of Zagreb (2000–2002, since 2005), heart attack.
- Michael J. Barron, 87, American jurist, judge of the Milwaukee County Circuit Court (1972–1988).
- Aqel Biltaji, 80, Jordanian politician, mayor of Amman (2013–2017), complications from COVID-19.
- Johnny Briggs, 85, English actor (Coronation Street, Man About the House, Carry On England).
- Theona Bryant, 89, American actress (The Miracle of the Hills, The Private Lives of Adam and Eve, The Last Time I Saw Archie), pneumonia.
- Larry Crabb, 77, American Christian counselor and author.
- Irv Cross, 81, American football player (Philadelphia Eagles, Los Angeles Rams) and sportscaster (The NFL Today).
- Zbyszek Darzynkiewicz, 84, Polish-American cell biologist.
- Sunil de Silva, 80, Sri Lankan politician, attorney general (1988–1992).
- Richard Faith, 94, American composer.
- Arnfinn Graue, 94, Norwegian nuclear physicist.
- Tom Green, 72, American Mormon polygamist, COVID-19.
- Roger Kibbe, 81, American serial killer, strangled.
- William Liller, 93, American astronomer.
- Ty Lund, 82, Canadian politician, Alberta MLA (1989–2012).
- Anna Majani, 85, Italian entrepreneur, COVID-19.
- Mamoru Morimoto, 81, Japanese Olympic runner (1964).
- Ian North, 68, American punk and new wave musician (Milk 'N' Cookies), heart attack.
- Jorge Oñate, 71, Colombian vallenato singer, complications from COVID-19.
- Mary Oshlag, 79, American bridge player, complications from Alzheimer's disease.
- Mahinur Qasimi, 91, Kazakh-born Chinese politician, delegate to the National People's Congress (1959–1975) and member of the Standing Committee (1988–1993).
- Glenn Roeder, 65, English football player (Queens Park Rangers) and manager (West Ham United, Newcastle United), brain cancer.
- Andrew Sardanis, 89, Cypriot-Zambian journalist and businessman.
- Karl Schiewerling, 69, German politician, MP (2005–2017).
- Yousuf Shaaban, 89, Egyptian actor (There is a Man in our House, Mother of the Bride, My Wife, the Director General), COVID-19.
- Syd Slocomb, 90, Australian footballer (St Kilda).
