= Michel Vuillermet =

French film director (1950–2021)

- Born: 13 March 1950
- Died: 16 February 2021 (aged 70)
- Occupation: Film Director

Michel Vuillermet (13 March 1950 – 16 February 2021) was a French film director.

== Biography ==
After studying modern humanities and history, Vuillermet joined the Institut des hautes études cinématographiques. Originally a cameraman, he first directed a film in 1980 with Le Règlement intérieur. It won best screenplay at the Festival du Livre de Nice and was presented at the Cannes Film Festival. He would also direct several documentaries for television.

Michel Vuillermet died on 16 February 2021, at the age of 70, twenty five days short from his 71st birthday.

== Filmography ==
- Le Règlement intérieur (1980)
- Le Cahier bleu clair (1981)
- Le piano des sondes (1981)
- Le Trio en mi bémol (1990)
- Rythme et mélodie de l'Océan Indien (1991)
- Nous, enfants du rock (1992)
- Le Grand méchant Zouc (1993)
- Les Mille compagnons (1994)
- Humanitaires face à a guerre (1995)
- André Malraux (1996)
- Afrique rouge (1997)
- Lucien Bodard ou Lulu le Chinois (1998)
- Superphenix ou Le Chaudron Magique (1999)
- Zafair Kaya (2000)
- Algérie, mémoires du raï (2001)
- Saddam Hussein, le maître de Bagdad (2002)
- Jean Malaurie, l'appel du Nord (2003)
- Côte d'ivoire, gagnons la paix (2004)
- Edouard VIII d’Angleterre, la faillite d'un roi (2004)
- Edmond Charlot, éditeur algérois (2005)
- Klimt ou le testament d'Adèle (2006)
- Léopold III ou la chute d'un roi (2007)
- Evian 38, la conférence de la peur (2009)
- Marie-Curie, au-delà du mythe (2011)
