= Andrei Palii =

Moldovan agronomist (1940–2021)

- Born: 1 May 1940; Scorțeni, Kingdom of Romania
- Died: 25 February 2021 (aged 80); Chișinău, Moldova
- Occupation: Agronomist

Andrei Palii (1 May 1940 – 25 February 2021) was a Moldovan agronomist. He was an elected corresponding member of the Academy of Sciences of Moldova and was inducted into the Order of Work Glory. He also received the Meritul Civic Medal in 1993.
