= Anna Majani =

Italian entrepreneur (1936–2021)

- Born: 4 February 1936; Bologna, Italy
- Died: 28 February 2021 (aged 85); Bologna, Italy
- Occupation: entrepreneur

Anna Majani (4 February 1936 – 28 February 2021) was an Italian entrepreneur. She was nicknamed "the queen of chocolate".

== Early life and education ==
Majani was born in Bologna, Italy, where her family owned a chocolate factory. When she was 15 she became pregnant. When she was 18 she began working in the family business after completing her studies, beginning a collaboration with her father, Francesco in the family's chocolate business. Majani's mother, Luisa Cavedoni, was a homemaker.

== Career ==
Her family's chocolate factory was founded by her ancestors in 1796, and calls itself the first chocolate-making company in Italy. Majani took control of the company in 1985, but by that time the family had sold most of its shares in the company. In order to reclaim ownership she had to mortgage her house. She became vice president, with her son Francesco Mezzadri Majani, whom she called "brother" because they were so close in age. Her son took care of the finances while Majani designed dozens of new shapes, textures and packages for their chocolate collections. She turned her family's chocolates into design objects, and added charisma to the company's brand.

Majani died in Bologna on 28 February 2021, aged 85, of COVID-19. The chocolate factory was the oldest chocolate factory in Italy with, at the time of her death, 225 years of history.
