= Maïté Mathieu =

French political activist (1928–2021)

Maïté Mathieu (24 December 1928 in Fécamp (Seine-Maritime) - 16 February 2021) was a French leftist Catholic political activist and feminist.
