= Blanca Álvarez González =

Spanish writer (1957–2021)

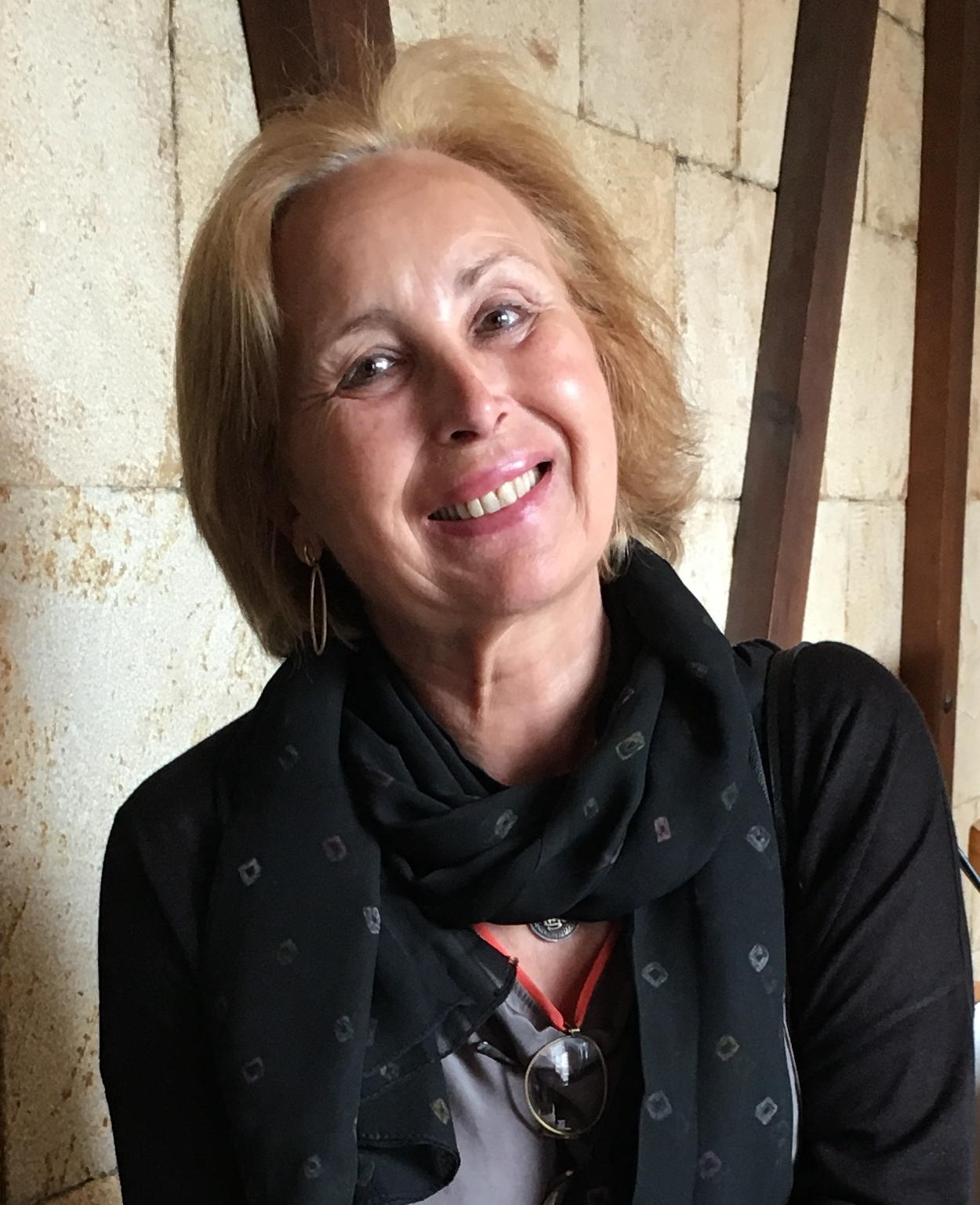
Blanca Álvarez González, 2016

Blanca Álvarez González (8 September 1957 – 14 February 2021) was a Spanish journalist, writer, and poet. Her work included poetry, novels, and essays, as well as children's and youth literature.

== Awards ==
- International Poetry Prize, Cálamo Awards.
- White Ravens 2001 for "Milú, un perro en desgracia" (Milú, a dog in disgrace).
- 2002, XIII Ala Delta Prize for "Caracoles, pendientes y mariposas" (Snails, earrings and butterflies)
- 2004, National Libraries of Venezuela chooses his book "El puente de los cerezos" as the best book published in Spanish.
- 2004, Critics' Prize of Asturias.
- 2005, Destino Infantil Apel-les Mestres Award 2005.
- 2007, Finalist in the Lazarillo Prize with "El maleficio de la espina", Destino Publishing House.
- 2007, "Palabras de pan" is chosen by the National Libraries of Venezuela, once again, as the best title published in Spanish.
- 2012, Anaya Prize for Children's Literature, for her children's novel "Aún te quedan ratones por cazar"
