= José Manuel Cortizas =

Spanish sports journalist (1963–2021)

- Born: José Manuel Cortizas Valladares; 1963; Bilbao, Spain
- Died: 27 February 2021 (aged 58); Barakaldo, Spain
- Occupation: Sports Journalist

José Manuel Cortizas (1963 – 27 February 2021) was a Spanish sports journalist and voice actor. He worked as a columnist for El Correo. and dubbed the voice of Hiroshi Nohara in the cartoon series Crayon Shin-chan.

== Biography ==
Cortizas began working for El Correo in the early 1990s, where he covered news on Bilbao Basket and golfer Jon Rahm, as well as live Formula One races and other rallies. Other sports he covered include football and boxing.

Cortizas dubbed for the series Crayon Shin-chan among others. He dubbed over a number of films and series.

José Manuel Cortizas died from COVID-19 during the COVID-19 pandemic in Spain in Barakaldo on 27 February 2021, at the age of 58.
