= Gabriel Zavala =

Mexican-born American mariachi musician and teacher (died 2021)

- Born: Mexico
- Died: February 26, 2021; Anaheim, California
- Occupation(s): Musician, teacher

Gabriel B. Zavala (died February 26, 2021) was a Mexican-born American mariachi musician and teacher, who became a "trailblazer" after moving to Orange County, California, where he played music with the group Los Siete Hermanos Zavala, and in 1996 started an academy, the Rhythmo Mariachi Academy, in Anaheim, California.

Zavala died in Anaheim at age 76 from complications of COVID-19. After his death, his son Oliver continued the academy.
