= Éva Olsavszky =

Hungarian actress (1929–2021)

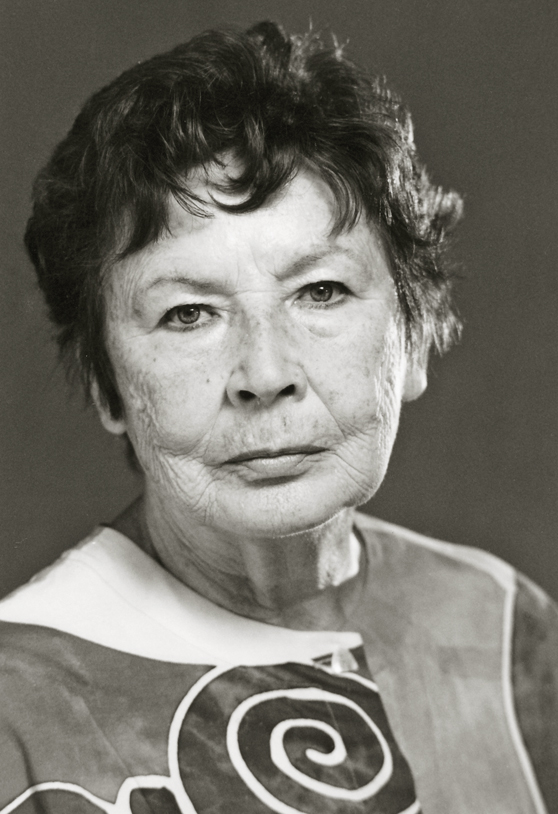
- Born: 18 September 1929; Budapest, Hungary
- Died: 27 February 2021 (aged 91)
- Occupation: Actress
- Years active: 1976–2008
- Spouse: Kun Vilmos (?–2015) (his death)

Éva Olsavszky (Budapest, 18 September 1929 – 27 February 2021) was a Hungarian actress. She co-founded the National Theater from 1980 and the Katona József Theater from 1982.
