= Gertrud Bense =

German linguist (1933–2021)

- Born: 22 April 1933; Pilkallen, East Prussia, Prussia, Germany (today Dobrovolsk, Kaliningrad Oblast, Russia)
- Died: 10 February 2021 (aged 87); Halle, Saxony-Anhalt, Germany
- Occupation: Linguist

Gertrud Bense (Lithuanian: Gertruda Benzė; 22 April 1933 – 10 February 2021) was a German linguist specializing in the Lithuanian language.

== Biography ==
Following World War II, Bense found herself in the Lithuanian Soviet Socialist Republic due to the redrawing of borders. She learned the Lithuanian language and graduated from the Martin Luther University of Halle-Wittenberg in 1961, earning her PhD. She then taught linguistics at her alma mater until 1993, carrying out vast amounts of research on the ethnographic region of Lithuania Minor and the texts of Protestant Lithuanian hymns. She also published a textbook on the Lithuanian language.

Gertrud Bense died on 10 February 2021, at the age of 87.
