= Hylke Tromp =

Dutch university teacher (1935–2021)

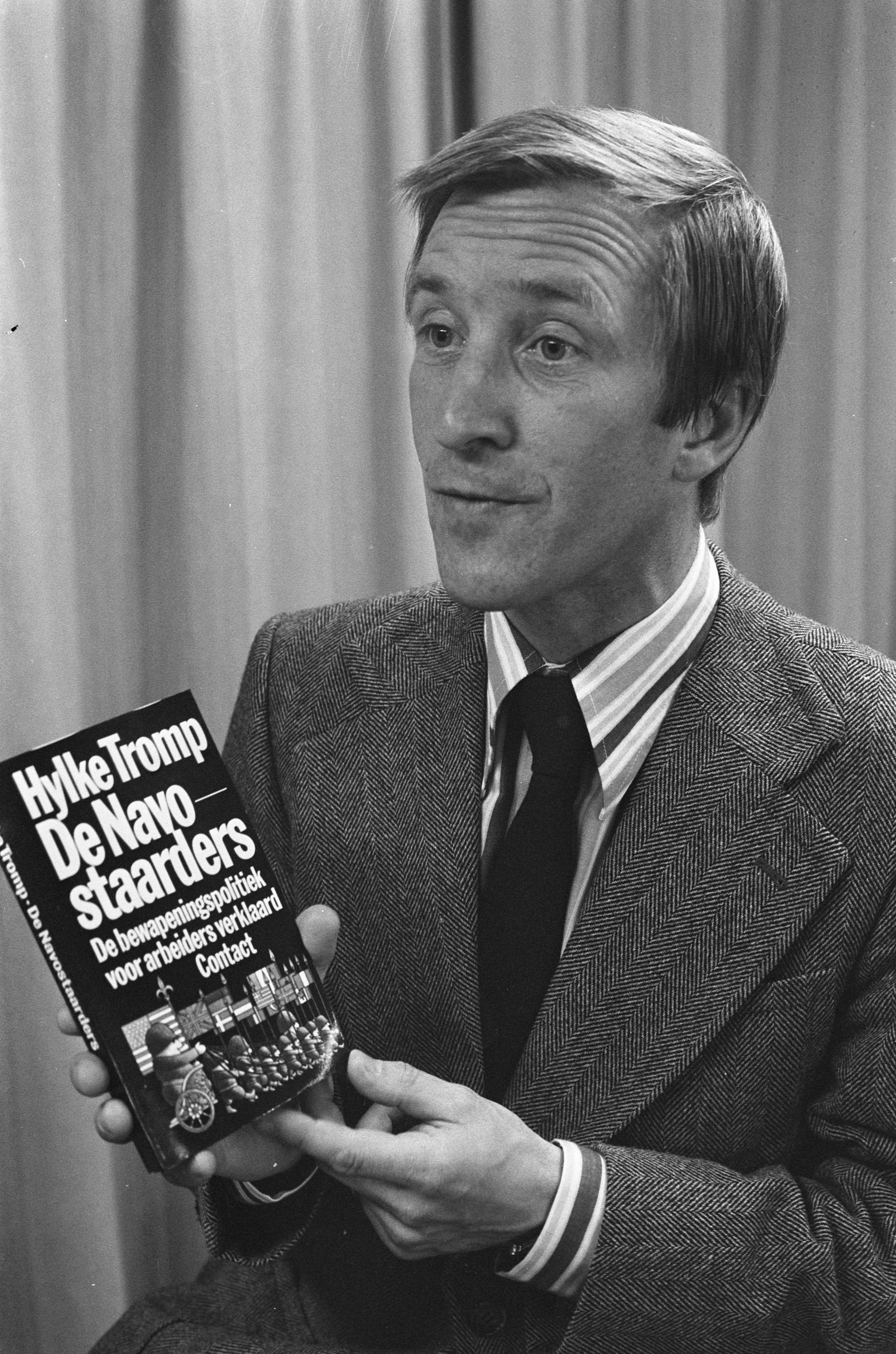
Hylke Tromp, 1974

Hylke Wybe Tromp (Sneek, 27 July 1935 - The Hague, 14 February 2021) was a Dutch polemologist.

== Career ==
Tromp studied social and political sciences at the Catholic University of Nijmegen where he obtained his doctorate in 1962. He also studied at the Free University of Berlin, where he would return in the summer of 1974 as a guest lecturer. Since 1964 he has been affiliated with the Polemological Institute, which falls under the Faculty of Law, of the University of Groningen, where he obtained his doctorate in war studies in 1976 with a dissertation on political views on political behavior in international situations. In 1980, he was appointed professor there in polemology, in which position he succeeded professor Bert Röling. After being director of the institute of polemology for some time, the institute was closed, after which Tromp was appointed director-general of the Inter University Center for Post Graduate Studies in Dubrovnik.

He was a member of the advisory board of the International Peace Institute (IIP) in Vienna. He was the elder brother of political scientist Bart Tromp.
