= Helen Rae =

American outsider artist (1938–2021)

Helen Rae (1938–2021) was an American outsider artist. Rae used fashion magazines as the inspiration and starting point for her colored-pencil drawings. A self-taught artist, Rae was deaf and non-verbal. She lived in Claremont California all of her life, and received recognition for her work late in life. Rae held her first solo exhibition in 2016, at age 76.

Her work is included in the collection of the Museum of Modern Art, New York.
