= Avetis Zenyan =

Russian cinematographer (1935–2021)

- Born: 25 December 1935; Beirut, Lebanese Republic
- Died: 17 February 2021 (aged 85)
- Occupation: Cinematographer

Avetis Zenyan (Russian: Аветис Назарович Зенян; 25 December 1935 – 17 February 2021) was a Russian cinematographer.

== Biography ==
Born in Beirut, Zenyan attended a French school in Aleppo before moving to Armenia in 1946. In 1954, he began attending the All-Union State Institute of Cinematography and defended his thesis in 1960. After his graduation, he worked for Armenfilm and Mosfilm. He then worked as a cameraman for numerous films produced in the Soviet Union, as he was the only cameraman to work on all parts of the television series War and Peace. He also aided in the restoration of the 1934 film Jolly Fellows. Additionally, he worked for the Communist Party, for which he filmed the Chernobyl disaster from a helicopter.

Avetis Zenyan died on 17 February 2021, at the age of 85.
