= Mufwankolo Wa Lesa =

Congolese humorist (1935–2021)

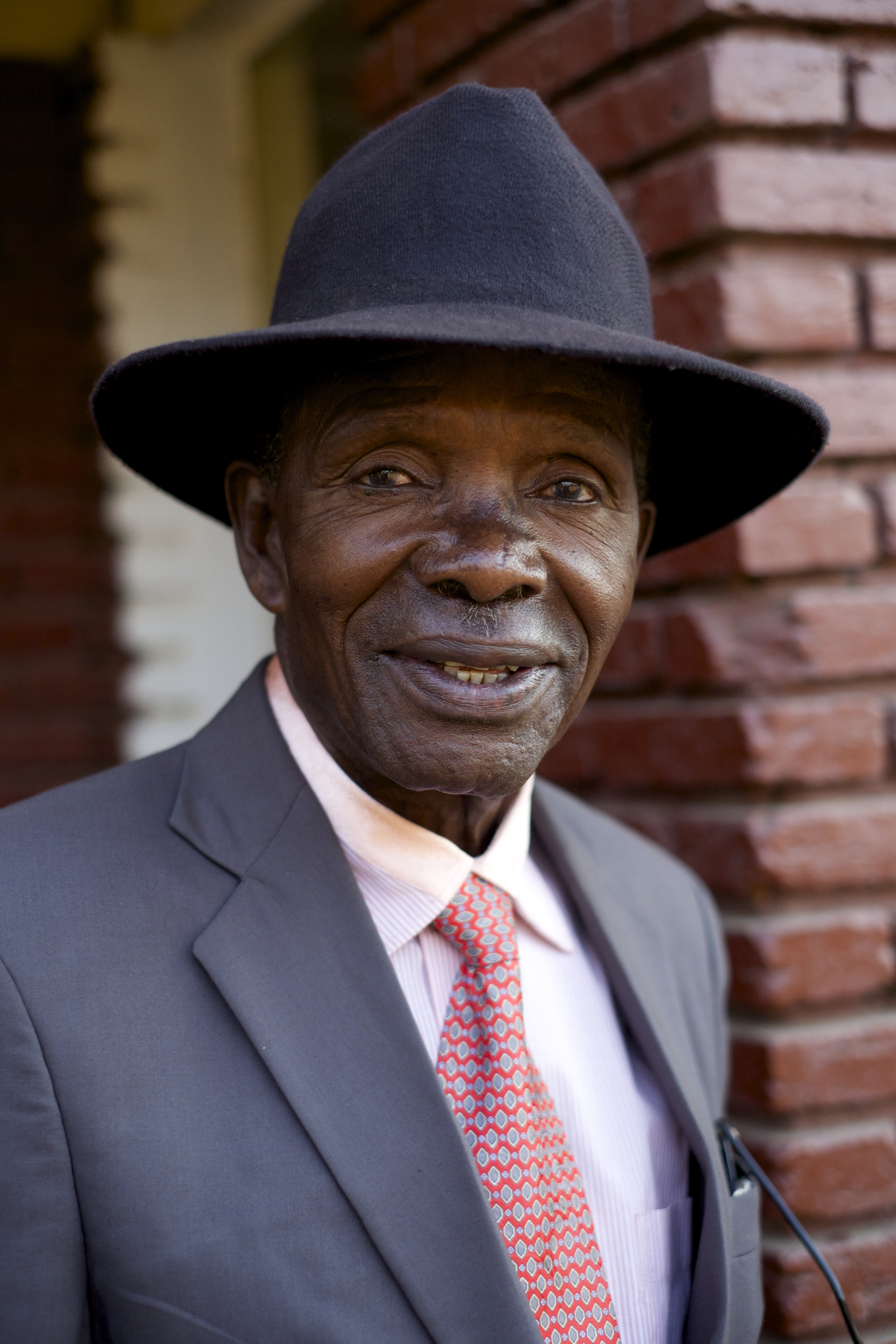
- Wa Lesa in 2014
- Born: 12 July 1935; Kuluwa, Belgian Congo
- Died: 17 February 2021 (aged 85); Lubumbashi, Democratic Republic of the Congo
- Occupation: Humorist

Mufwankolo Wa Lesa (12 July 1935 – 17 February 2021) was a Congolese humorist and theatre director. He made significant contributions to the theatrical and cultural scene in Katanga.
