= Nicole Mosconi =

French philosopher and professor (1942–2021)

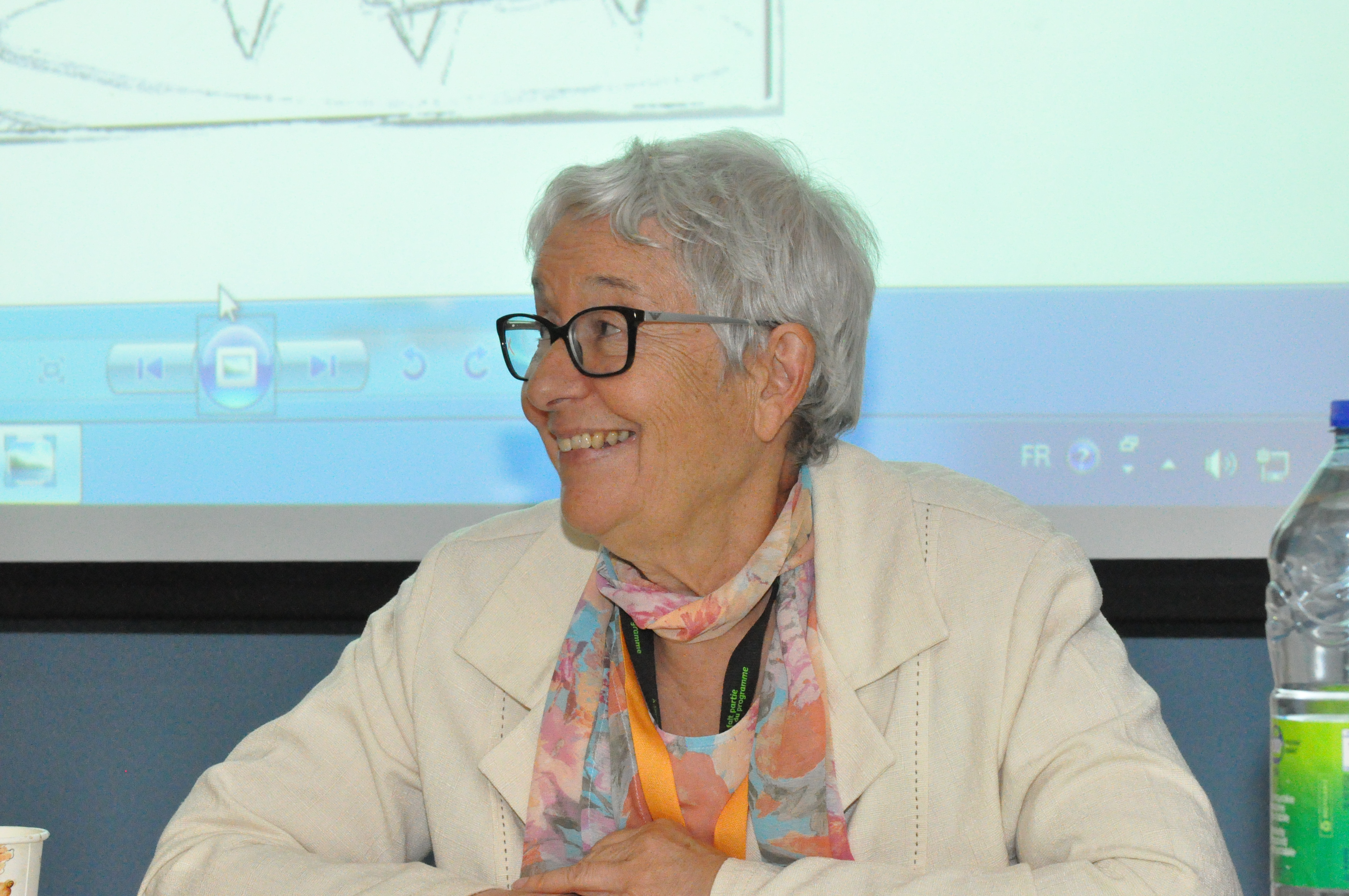
- Mosconi in 2015
- Born: Nicole Aubineau; 2 June 1942
- Died: 7 February 2021 (aged 78)
- Occupations: Philosopher; Professor

Nicole Mosconi (2 June 1942 – 7 February 2021) was a French philosopher and professor. A specialist in educational questions, she was a member of the Institut Émilie-du-Châtelet from 2006 until her death.

== Biography ==
Mosconi, née Aubineau, graduated from the École normale supérieure de jeunes filles in 1961 with an agrégation in philosophy. She earned a doctorate from Paris Nanterre University in 1986 under the direction of Gilles Ferry with the title "La mixité dans l'enseignement secondaire : un faux-semblant ?" In 1992, she published "Savoir, rapport au savoir et différence des sexes". In 1994, she became a professor of educational sciences.

Mosconi participated in research activities with the Centre de recherches éducation et formation in Nanterre, as well as at the University of Paris 8 Vincennes-Saint-Denis. With her team in Saint-Denis, she contributed to epistemology research. With her Nanterre team, she published three books, titled Savoir et rapport au savoir, Pour une clinique du rapport au savoir, and Formes et formation du rapport au savoir. She was particularly interested in the study of sex and gender, and how social and educational factors result in differences of performance between genders in school and careers.

Mosconi sat on the management committee of the Institut Émilie-du-Châtelet upon its foundation in 2006, and remained a member after her retirement. She served on the board of directors of the Association nationale des études féministes from 1998 to 2008. She served on the editorial board of the journals Recherche & formation and Travail Genre et Sociétés. She also served on the reading board of Carrefours de l'éducation.

Nicole Mosconi died on 7 February 2021 at the age of 78.

== Publications ==
=== Books ===
- La mixité dans l'enseignement secondaire, un faux-semblant ? (1989)
- Égalité des sexes en éducation et formation (1998)
- Plaisir, souffrance, indifférence en éducation (2002)
- Traité des sciences et des pratiques de l'éducation (2006)
- De la croyance à la différence des sexes (2016)
- Genre et éducation des filles : Des clartés de tout (2017)

=== Collective Works ===
- Savoir et rapport au savoir (1989)
- Pour une clinique du rapport au savoir (1996)
- Formes et formation du rapport au savoir (2000)
- Autobiographie de Carl Rogers. Lectures plurielles (2003)

== Distinctions ==
- Knight of the Legion of Honour
