= Maite Axiari =

Spanish feminist activist (1949–2021)

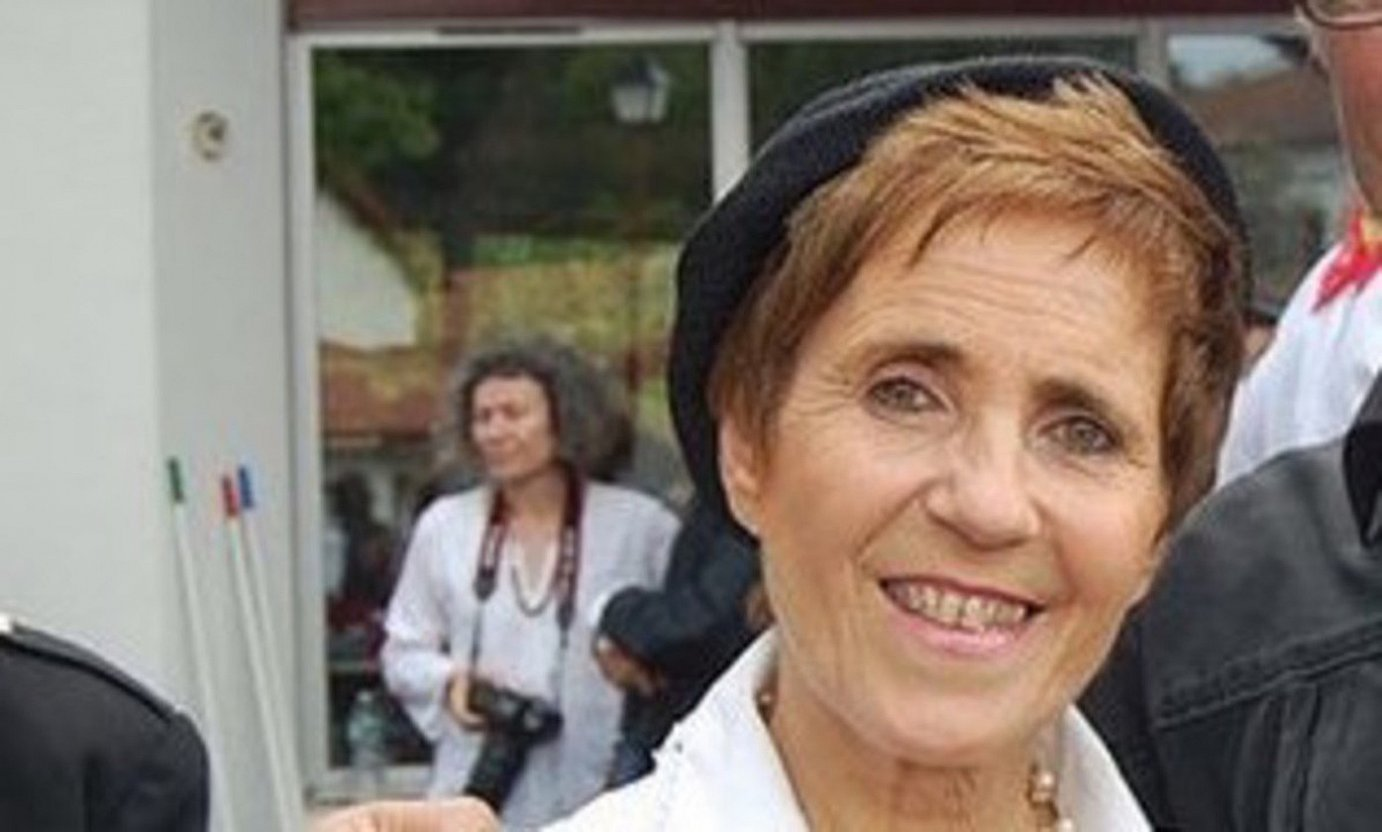

Maite Axiari (Espelette, 1949 - 10 February 2021) was a French Basque feminist activist.

She was one of the pioneers of the feminist movement and human rights in the Basque Country. She was a member of the Bohemian Wives Choir. She was the organizer of the Errobi festival and president of the Eskandrai association.

She was the founder of the Ezkandrai association, with her husband Beñat Axiari, which promoted various cultural initiatives, such as the Les Ethopiques festival in Bayonne and the Errobiko Festival in Itsasun.
