= N. K. Sukumaran Nair =

Indian environmentalist (1942–2021)

N. K. Sukumaran Nair (6 June 1942 – 27 February 2021) was an acclaimed environmental activist and General Secretary of Pampa Samrakshana Samithi (PSS).

== Early life ==
He was born at Poovathur in Pathanamthitta District, Kerala State. He was the recipient of Jaiji Peter Foundation Gold medal and citation for the State's best environmental activist in the year 2007. He has recently been engaged in working to save the Pamba River. He was given the Paristhithi Mithra award in February 2018.
