= Tong Djoe =

Indonesian businessman (1926–2021)

- Born: 26 September 1926; Medan, Dutch East Indies
- Died: 8 February 2021 (aged 94); Jakarta, Indonesia
- Occupation: Businessman

Tong Djoe (26 September 1926 – 8 February 2021) was an Indonesian businessman. He was the President of Tunas Group Pte. Ltd., based out of Singapore. He also helped play a key role in diplomatic relations between Indonesia and China. He had a close relationship with President Sukarno, helping forge trading ties with him and Mao Zedong.

In 1998, Djoe was awarded a Service Star for his contributions to Indonesian-Chinese trade by President B. J. Habibie. He died in Jakarta on 8 February 2021 at the age of 94.
