= Françoise Winnik =

French academic (1952–2021)

- Born: 2 March 1952; Mulhouse, France
- Died: 13 February 2021 (aged 68); Helsinki, Finland
- Occupation: academic
- Awards: Prix Acfas Urgel-Archambault (2015)

Françoise Winnik (2 March 1952 – 13 February 2021) was a French-born Canadian chemical researcher and professor. She was awarded the Prix Acfas Urgel-Archambault in 2015.

Winnink was born and raised in France, where she earned her undergraduate degree in chemical engineering at the National School of Chemistry in Mulhouse, in 1973. She finished her master's degree and PhD in Toronto, Canada in 1974 and 1979 respectively. She later became associate professor at the University of Montreal. the chemistry and physics departments at McMaster University in Canada. In 2018, she moved to Finland and worked at the University of Helsinki. She was elected Foreign Member of The Finnish Society of Sciences and Letters in 2013.

Winnik died in Helsinki on 13 February 2021.

== Publications ==
- 2001. S. Mansouri, Y. Mehri, F. M. Winnik, M. Tabrizian. « Investigation of the layer-by-layer assembly onto fully functional human red blood cells in suspension for attenuated immune response », dans Biomacromolecules, 2001, 12, pp. 585–592.
- 2010. V. A. Kryuchkov. J. C. Daigle, K. M. Skupov, J. Claverie, F. M. Winnik. « Amphiphilic polyethylenes leading to surfactant-free thermoresponsive nanoparticles », dans Journal of American Chemistry Society, 2010, 133(44), pp. 15573–15579.

== Awards ==
2015 : Lauréate du prix Acfas Urgel-Archambault
