= Kōjirō Akagi =

Japanese painter (1934–2021)

Kōjirō Akagi (赤木 曠児郎, Akagi Kōjirō) (3 January 1934 – 15 February 2021) was a Japanese painter. He was born in Okayama, Japan, but was based in France.

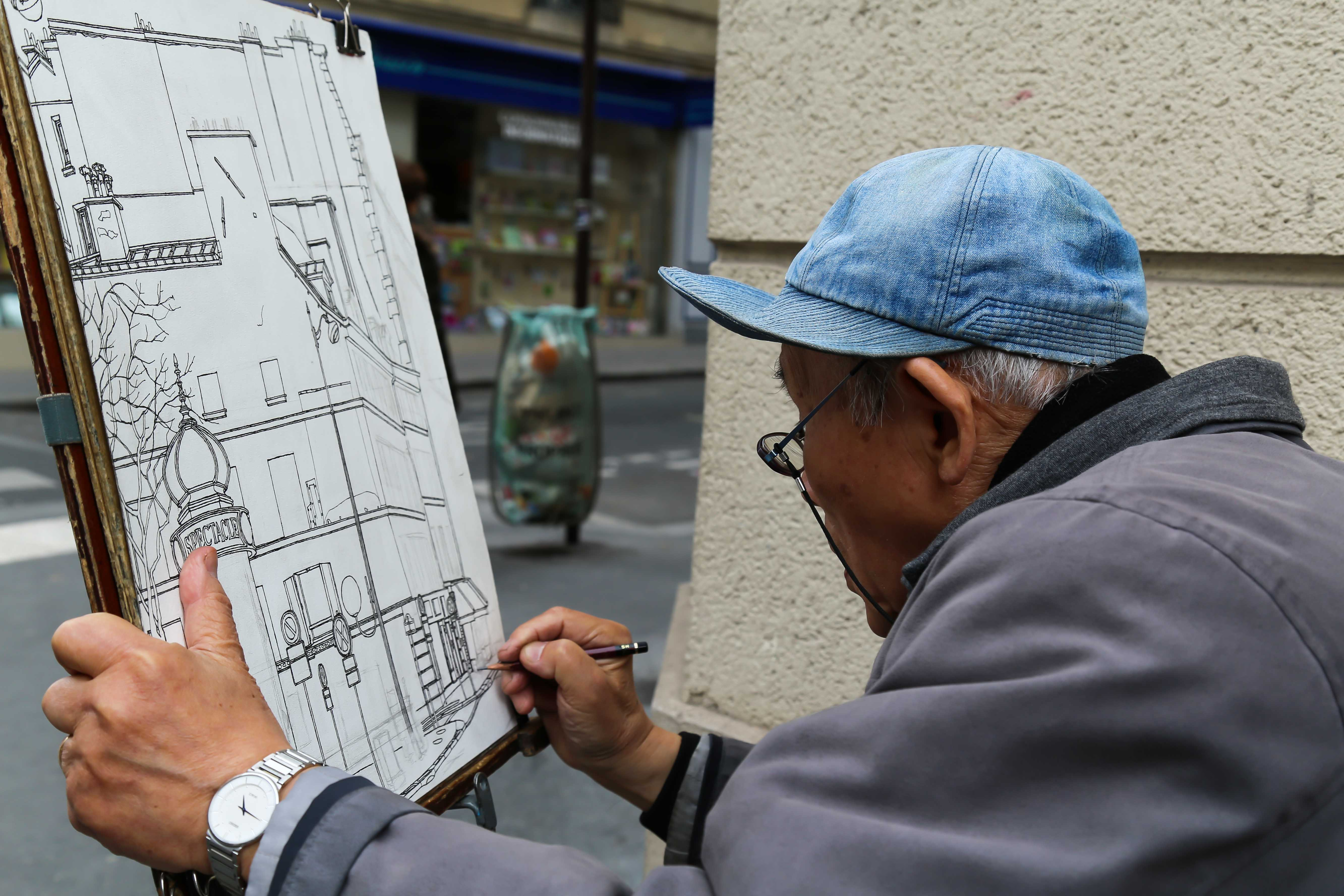

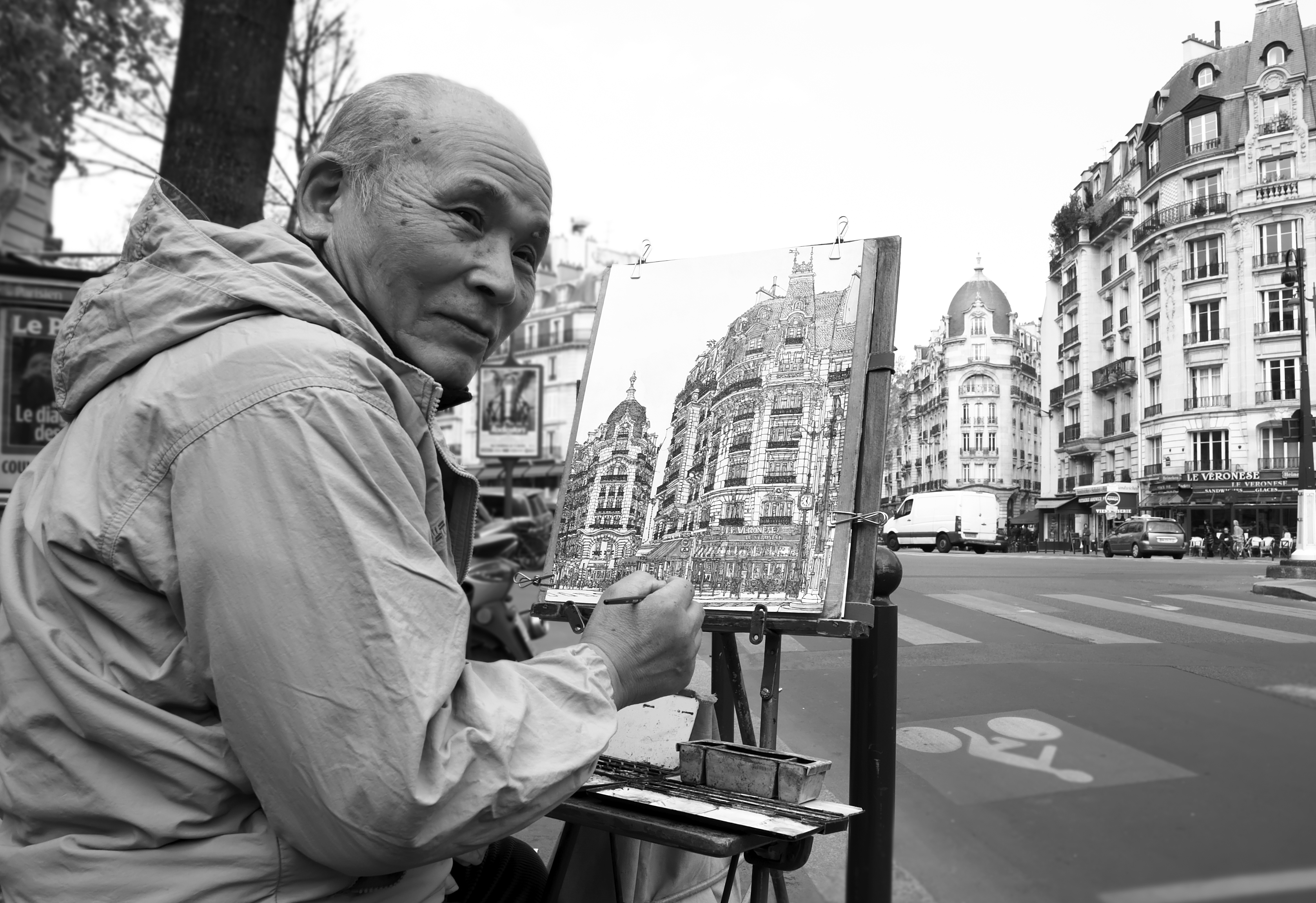

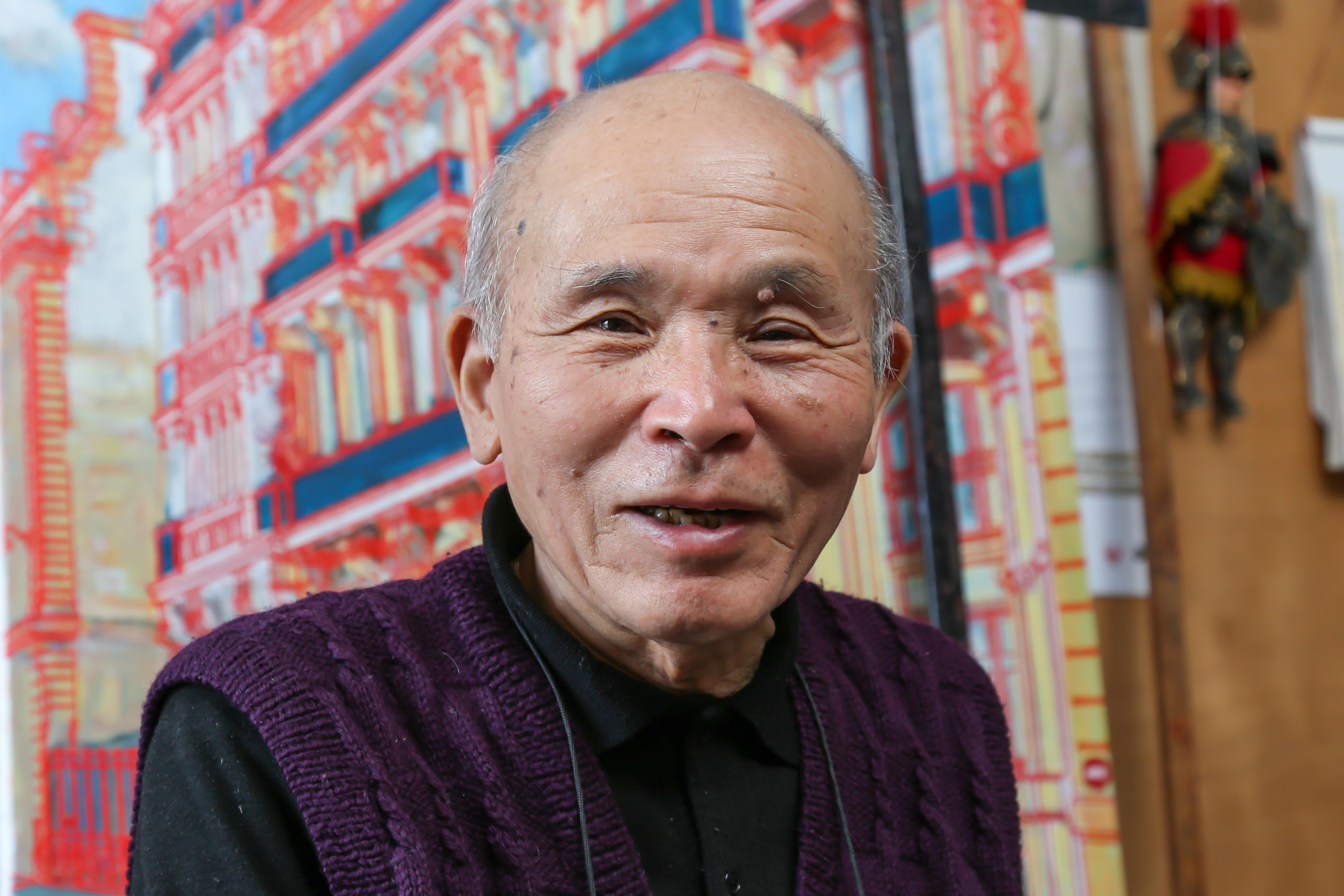

== Life and career ==
- 1956 Bachelor's degree in physics. Okayama University, Japan.
- 1963 Arrived in France from Japan. Beaux-Arts, Paris.
- Professor Brianchon studio, followed by Professor Mattey.
- 1971 Gold Medal for watercolours. Le Salon Salon des Artistes Français.
- 1974 Gold Medal for oil painting. Member Hors Concours (HC) Le Salon Salon des Artistes Français.
- 1975 Award of the President of the French Republic, International Art Exhibition, Toulon, President of jury Edouard Pignon, France.
- 1991 Charles Cottet Prize. National Exhibition of Fine Arts, France.
- 1994 Navy Blue Ribbon Medal by Japanese Government.
- 1998 Second Navy Blue Ribbon Medal by Japanese Government.
- 2000 Gold Medal for engraving. Grimaldi Castle and Museum, France.
- 2002 Puvis de Chavanne Prize. National Exhibition of Fine Arts, France.
- 2002 Honor Medal of the Japanese Minister of Foreign Affairs.
- 2005 Order of the Rising Sun, gold rays with rosette, Japan.
- 2006 Who's Who Prize. Le Salon, Art en Capital, Grand Palais, France.
- 2011 Award of picture 2011, Salon d'automne, France.
- 2014 Knight of the Order of Arts and Letters, France.
- 2014 VERDAGUER's Prize of the painting 2014 of the Institut de France by Académie des beaux-arts, France.
- 2019 Medal of Honor by Mayor of Paris 15th, France.

== Public exhibitions in France ==
- 1978–1979: "My Paris" Carnavalet Museum of the City Paris.
- 1986: "AKAGI - Paris Architecture" College Students' Youth Club.
- 1993: "Akagi's Paris" Étoile Mitsukoshi Space (an event for the 10th anniversary of the two towns' friendship: Paris–Tokyo)
- 1998: "Akagi's Paris " Trocadéro Library.
- 2002: "Akagi – From the country of the rising sun to eastern Paris" (Town hall of Paris 20th district)
- 2002: "Invited artist for the year's retrospective" (with Kisling) Independents' Salon.
- 2004: "Akagi, 40 years in Paris, 1963–2003" Paris-Museum, Archaeological Crypt.
- 2008: "France Japan: one century and half cross-looks, Mathurin Méheut, Kojiro Akagi " Town hall of Paris 9th district and, in parallel, at the House of Brittany.
- 2009: "Kojiro Akagi known and unknown" Town hall of Paris 5th district.
- 2012: "Akagi Exhibition, Yôkoso! Paris" Town halls of Paris 5th and 8th districts.
- 2015: "Akagi at the Pyramide of Saint-Amand-Montround city" Saint-Amand-Montround.
- 2016: "Akagi - one hundred views of Paris" Castle and Garden of Villandry, Loire France.
- 2019: "85years Mr AKAGI" Town hall of Paris 15th.

== Associations ==
- 1963 Member of the Japanese Artists Association, Japan.
- 1968 Member of Salon des Independents, France.
- 1970 Member of Salon d'Automne, France.
- 1970 Associate member of French Artist society (outside competition member since 1974)
- 1973 Member of Salon National des Beaux-Arts, France.
- 1982 Committee Member Salon International des Beaux-Arts, France.
- 2002 Honorary vice-president Salon National des Beaux-Arts, France.

== Museum collections ==
- 1975 Toulon City Museum, France
- 1979–1981, 1987, 1991–1993, 2013 Carnavalet Museum of Paris (128 works of art: 3 oil paintings and 125 watercolors), France.
- 1981–2013 Cernuschi Museum, Paris, (1 painting, 1 engraving), France.
- 1981–2002 MOA Museum of Atami (2 oil paintings and 1 watercolor), Japan.
- 1991 Vatican Museum, Department of religious modern arts, Italy
- 1993 Royal Ueno Museum, Tokyo (1 oil painting). Culture Prefectural Kyoto Museum City of Kyoto (1 oil painting), Japan.
- 1993–1998 Prefectural Museum of Okayama (5 oil paintings, 2 watercolors and 53 illustrations of Sany Newspaper), Japan.
- 1993–2005 Kurashiki City Modern Museum (3 oil paintings), Japan.
- 1998–2009 WAKO Museum, Kasaoka (3 oil paintings), Japan.
- 2000 Grimaldi Castle and Museum (2 silk-screens), France.
- 2001 Nariwa City Museum (1 watercolor), Japan.
- 2002–2014 Grez-sur-Loing City Museum (1 oil painting and 2 watercolors), France.
- 2003–2005 Patricia Clark Museum (1 oil painting, 2 watercolors), Iowa, USA.
- 2014 Toulouse-Lautrec Museum of Albi (1 watercolor), France.

== Collectives collections ==
- 1971–1973 French State (2 oil paintings), France.
- 1983 Saidaiji High School (1 oil painting) Okayama, Japan.
- 1986 Foyer des Lycennes (1 oil painting) Paris, France.
- 1993 Okayama City Hall (1 oil painting), Japan.
- 1996-2006 Embassy of Japan (1 oil painting and 2 watercolors), France.
- 1997 Sanyo High School for Girls, Okayama (1 oil painting and 2 engravings), Japan.
- 1998 Trocadero Library, Paris (1 engraving) France.
- 2000 Okayama University (1 engraving), Japan.
- 1975–2010 National Library, Paris (collection engraving), France.
- 2011 Japanese cultural center in Paris (1 oil painting) Paris, France.
- 2014 Prefecture of Okayama (1 oil painting), Okayama, Japan.
- 2018 Maison Franco-japonais (1 oil painting), Ebisu,Tokyo, Japan.
- 2019 Town Hall of Paris 15th (1 oil painting), France.
