= Yuri Shvachkin =

Russian chemist (1930–2021)

Yuri Petrovich Shvachkin (Russian: Ю́рий Петро́вич Швачкин; 15 November 1930 in Yevpatoria, USSR – 20 February 2021 in Moscow, Russia) was a Soviet and Russian chemist.

== Career ==
He was a Doctor of Chemistry, Professor of the Department of Chemistry of Natural Compounds, Faculty of Chemistry, Moscow State University. He is one of the first Soviet scientists who worked on the development of methods for the synthesis of human insulin and was heavily invested in the study of human semen.
