= Richard Tomita =

American weightlifter (1927–2021)

Richard Kiyoshi Tomita (July 8, 1927 – February 12, 2021) was an American weightlifter who competed in the 1948 Summer Olympics.
