= Ellen Cheever =

American interior designer (1949–2021)

Ellen Cheever (1949 – February 12, 2021) was an American interior designer and kitchen historian.

She played a critical role in establishing the fields of kitchen and bathroom design.

Cheever died in February 2021, in Wilmington, Delaware.
