= Joan Clark Netherwood =

American photographer (1932–2021)

- Born: 1932; York, SC
- Died: February 8, 2021 (aged 88–89)

Joan Clark Netherwood (1932 – 8 February 2021) was an American photographer. With Elinor Cahn and Linda Rich, she was a founder and active participant in the East Baltimore Documentary Survey Project between 1975 and 1980. Her work is included in the collection of the Smithsonian American Art Museum and the Library of Congress.
