= Pavel Vácha =

Czechoslovak photographer (1940–2021)

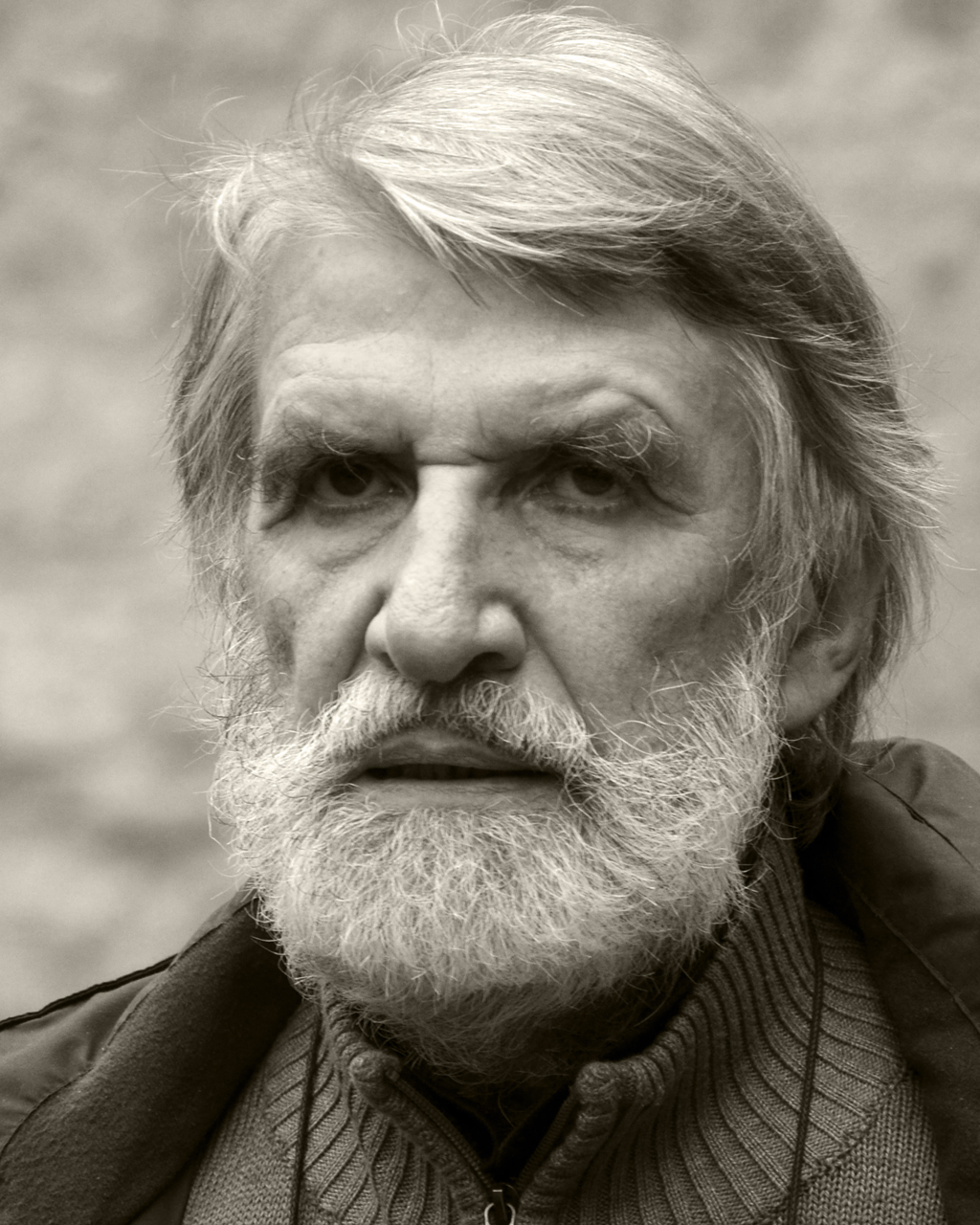
Pavel Vácha, 2016

Pavel Vácha (11 June 1940 in Prague – 12 February 2021 in Prague) was a Czech photographer.

== Life ==
He studied geology in high school and worked as a geologist for several years. In the years 1963–1967, he worked simultaneously as a photo reporter for the Czechoslovak Sport daily. He studied photography at the Film and Television Faculty of the Academy of Performing Arts in Prague, graduating in 1971. He collaborated with the magazines Mladý svět and Květy. In 1979, he married Věra Hlaďová. They had two children together. In 1992, he worked briefly with the daily Prostor.

According to the Records of Counterintelligence and Intelligence Units of the StB (Records under Section 7 of Act No. 107/2002 Coll.), Pavel Vácha was a StB agent with the pseudonym Sad (Registration number (file number) 27676, Archive number 780352).
