= Simonetta Bernardi =

Italian historian (1940–2021)

- Born: 23 January 1940; Rome, Kingdom of Italy
- Died: 13 February 2021 (aged 81); Rome, Italy
- Occupation: Historian

Simonetta Bernardi (23 January 1940 – 13 February 2021) was an Italian historian and academic. She taught at the Sapienza University of Rome and at Roma Tre University.

== Biography ==
Bernardi graduated from the Vatican School of Palaeography, Diplomatics and Archives Administration in 1965 with a degree in medieval history. Much of her research focused on that of Italian Jews during the Middle Ages and the Renaissance, a large proportion of which was on behalf of Tel Aviv University. She also covered the Marche region in medieval Italy's economic sphere, as well as the role of women in the workplace in the area. In these studies, she worked with the International Commission for the History of Representative and Parliamentary Institutions and other national societies.

Simonetta Bernardi died in Rome on 13 February 2021 at the age of 81.

== Works ==
- Le pergamene del Monastero di Santa Caterina (1983)
- Note sulla comunità ebraica di Cingoli nel Medioevo (1986)
- Esempi di assistenza a Cingoli nel secolo XIII: gli ospedali di Spineto e di Buraco (1986)
- Nobiltà feudale ed istituzionale nel comitato di Osimo fra XIII e XV secolo: esempi nel ceto dirigente del Comune di Cingoli, in Dimensioni e Problemi della ricerca storica (1993)
- Presenze ebraiche nelle Marche: un caso nella Valle del Fiasta (1993)
- La religione e il trono: Pio VIII nell'Europa del suo tempo: convegno di studi (1993)
- Gli ebrei nella società maceratense fra XIV e XV secolo (1995)
- La presenza dimenticata: il femminile nell'Italia moderna fra storia, letteratura, filosofia (1996)
- Monasteri femminili di Cingoli nei secoli XIII-XIV (2001)
- Un territorio, una città: l'evoluzione di Cingoli fra X e XII secolo (2005)
- Mala tempora per gli ebrei nella Marca Anconetana: alcuni documenti della metà del XVI secolo, in Una manna buona per Mantova, Studi in onore di Vittore Colorni (2004)
- Nuovi spunti di ricerca per la questione ebraica nel Medio Evo (2005)
- Da municipium romano a castrum medievale: Cingulum nella guerra gotica (2006)
- I medici nella società comunale: appunti da documentazione marchigiana
- L'Archivio storico del comune di Cingoli (2020)
