= Deaths in October 2021 =

The following is a list of notable deaths in October 2021.

Entries for each day are listed alphabetically by surname. A typical entry lists information in the following sequence:

- Name, age, country of citizenship at birth, subsequent country of citizenship (if applicable), reason for notability, cause of death (if known), and reference.

== October 2021 ==
=== 1 ===
- Buddy Alliston, 87, American football player (Winnipeg Blue Bombers, Denver Broncos).
- Oğuzhan Asiltürk, 86, Turkish politician, MP (1973–1980, 1991–2002), minister of the interior (1974–1977) and of industry and technology (1977–1978), COVID-19.
- John Blackburn, 73, British Anglican priest, chaplain general of the British Army (2000–2004).
- Adam Blatner, 84, American psychiatrist.
- British Idiom, 4, American Thoroughbred racehorse.
- Howard W. Carroll, 79, American politician.
- Peter Darke, 67, English footballer (Plymouth Argyle).
- Scott Eaton, 77, American football player (New York Giants).
- Renán Fuentealba Moena, 104, Chilean politician, deputy (1957–1965), president of Christian Democratic Party (1961–1965, 1972–1973) and senator (1965–1973).
- Raymond Gniewek, 89, American violinist.
- Nora Gúnera de Melgar, 78, Honduran politician, first lady (1975–1978), mayor of Tegucigalpa (1990–1994) and deputy (2007–2014).
- Erwin J. Haeberle, 85, German social scientist and sexologist.
- Richard W. Hanselman, 93, American businessman.
- Fred Hill, 81, English footballer (Bolton Wanderers, national team).
- William Izarra, 74, Venezuelan politician, military official and diplomat, senator (1998–1999) and ambassador to North Korea (since 2021), COVID-19.
- Alfredo Jadresic, 96, Chilean Olympic high jumper (1948) and scientist.
- Lissy Jarvik, 97, Dutch-born American psychiatrist.
- Ibrahim Kefas, 73, Nigerian politician, military administrator of Cross River State (1993–1994) and Delta State (1994–1996).
- Vytautas Kolesnikovas, 72, Lithuanian painter and politician, member of the Supreme Council (1990–1992) and signatory of the Act of the Re-Establishment of the State of Lithuania.
- Paul Linger, 46, English footballer (Charlton Athletic, Brighton & Hove Albion), pancreatic cancer.
- Ewert Ljusberg, 76, Swedish musician, president of the Republic of Jamtland (since 1989).
- Frank LoCascio, 89, American mobster (Gambino crime family).
- Bob Mendes, 93, Belgian accountant and writer.
- Hugo Anthony Meynell, 85, English academic.
- Edgar Morales, 81, Salvadoran Olympic footballer.
- Robin Morton, 81, Irish folk musician.
- M.O. Nelson, 100, Canadian business executive.
- Andreas Neocleous, 82, Cypriot lawyer and politician, founder of Andreas Neocleous & Co and MP (1970–1976), COVID-19.
- Eberhard Panitz, 89, German writer.
- Sune Sandbring, 93, Swedish footballer (Malmö FF, national team).
- Andrea Schroeder, 57, American politician, member of the Michigan House of Representatives (since 2019), stomach cancer.
- Brian Sherratt, 77, English footballer (Oxford United, Stoke City, Barnsley).
- Frieda Stahl, 99, American physics historian.
- Jimmy Stevens, 79, English musician.
- Sir Dennis Walters, 92, British politician, MP (1964–1992).
- Earle Wells, 87, New Zealand sailor and rower, Olympic champion (1964).
- Zhang Hanxin, 85, Chinese physicist, member of the Chinese Academy of Sciences.
- Zhang Xudong, 59, Chinese military officer, commander of the Western Theater Command (2020–2021), cancer.

=== 2 ===
- Tajdar Babar, 85, Indian politician, Delhi MLA (1993–2008).
- Ziauddin Ahmed Bablu, 66, Bangladeshi politician, MP (2014–2019), complications from COVID-19.
- Jack Biondolillo, 81, American bowler, dementia with complicating kidney failure.
- Dana Bumgardner, 67, American politician, member of the North Carolina House of Representatives (since 2013), cancer.
- Ladislav Čepčianský, 90, Czech Olympic sprint canoeist (1956, 1960).
- Anthony Downs, 90, American economist and politologist (An Economic Theory of Democracy).
- Richard Evans, 86, American actor (Peyton Place, Islands in the Stream, Dirty Little Billy).
- Michel Fernex, 92, Swiss physician.
- Rose Franco, 87, American warrant officer.
- Agostino Gambino, 88, Italian jurist and politician, minister of communications (1995–1996).
- Chuck Hartenstein, 79, American baseball player (Chicago Cubs, Pittsburgh Pirates, St. Louis Cardinals).
- Jim Hess, 84, American college and high school football coach (Angelo State Rams, Stephen F. Austin Lumberjacks, New Mexico State Aggies).
- Matt Holmes, 54, British military officer, Commandant General Royal Marines (2019–2021).
- Peter Jenkins, 77, Canadian politician, mayor of Dawson City (1980–1994, 2009–2012) and Yukon MLA (1996–2006), COVID-19.
- Joe Kantor, 78, American football player (Washington Redskins).
- Hans Kruse, 91, Samoan civil servant and rugby union player (national team).
- Ladislaus Löb, 88, Romanian-born Swiss Germanist and Holocaust survivor.
- Alfredo Martínez Moreno, 98, Salvadoran jurist, diplomat and writer, president of the Supreme Court (1968), director of the ASL (1969–2006) and minister of foreign affairs (1967–1968).
- Stuart McDonald, 90, American editorial cartoonist and politician.
- Dattaram Maruti Mirasdar, 94, Indian writer and humourist.
- Mortimer Mishkin, 94, American neuropsychologist.
- Valeriu Mițul, 60, Moldovan political activist, mayor of Corjova, Dubăsari (since 1995).
- Leonard Moss, 89, English Anglican clergyman, archdeacon of Hereford (1991–1997).
- Ioannis Palaiokrassas, 87, Greek politician, minister of finance (1990–1992) and European commissioner (1993–1994).
- Inder Bir Singh Passi, 82, Indian mathematician.
- Colin Pratt, 82, English motorcycle speedway rider (Poole Pirates, Stoke Potters, Hackney Hawks), cancer.
- Dave Roberts, 88, Panamanian-American baseball player (Houston Colt .45s, Pittsburgh Pirates, Tokyo Yakult Swallows).
- Bill Russo, 74, American college football coach (Lafayette Leopards, Wagner Seahawks).
- Umer Shareef, 61, Pakistani comedian and television host (The Shareef Show Mubarak Ho), pneumonia.
- Herta Staal, 91, Austrian actress (The Charming Young Lady, My Sister and I, Where the Ancient Forests Rustle).
- Franciszek Surmiński, 86, Polish racing cyclist.
- Sebastião Tapajós, 78, Brazilian guitarist and composer.
- John Wes Townley, 31, American racing driver (NASCAR Camping World Truck Series), shot.
- Michel Tubiana, 68, French lawyer and jurist.
- Sidney Walton, 102, American World War II veteran.
- Major Wingate, 37, American basketball player (Springfield Armor, Shanxi Zhongyu, Tofas Bursa).

=== 3 ===
- Todd Akin, 74, American politician, member of the Missouri (1989–2001) and U.S. House of Representatives (2001–2013), cancer.
- James Baar, 92, American author and public relations consultant.
- Paul Barratt, 77, Australian public servant, secretary of the Department of Primary Industries and Energy (1996–1998) and Defence (1998–1999).
- Luis Belló, 92, Spanish football player (Hércules, Cieza) and manager (Real Zaragoza).
- Blanka Bohdanová, 91, Czech actress (Romeo, Juliet and Darkness, Když rozvod, tak rozvod, Thirty Cases of Major Zeman).
- Siegfried Borchardt, 67, German political activist.
- Lee Brozgol, 80, American artist.
- Sir John Chilcot, 82, British civil servant, kidney disease.
- Antonio Debenedetti, 84, Italian writer, journalist and poet.
- Samantha Epasinghe, 54, Sri Lankan actress, COVID-19.
- Anouman Brou Félix, 86, Ivorian musician.
- Josep Maria Forn, 93, Spanish film director (Companys, procés a Catalunya) and actor.
- Alan Grahame, 67, British motorcycle speedway rider (Poole Pirates, Hull Vikings, Cradley Heathens), injuries sustained in a race collision.
- Cynthia Harris, 87, American actress (Mad About You, Edward & Mrs. Simpson, Three Men and a Baby).
- Neil Hawryliw, 65, Canadian ice hockey player (New York Islanders).
- José Luis Lamadrid, 91, Mexican footballer (Club Necaxa, national team).
- Daniel Leone, 28, Italian footballer (Pontedera, Reggiana, Catanzaro), brain cancer.
- Ivan Lubennikov, 70, Russian painter.
- Maurice Malleret, 90, French writer and historian.
- Irwin Marcus, 102, American psychiatrist.
- Jorge Medina, 94, Chilean Roman Catholic cardinal, bishop of Rancagua (1987–1993) and Valparaíso (1993–1996), prefect of the Congregation for Divine Worship (1996–2002).
- Ghanashyam Nayak, 77, Indian actor (Taarak Mehta Ka Ooltah Chashmah, Krantiveer, Hum Dil De Chuke Sanam), cancer.
- Tomas Norström, 65, Swedish actor (The Hunters, Good Evening, Mr. Wallenberg, The White Viking), brain tumor.
- Dan Petrescu, 68, Romanian businessman, plane crash.
- Marc Pilcher, 53, British makeup artist (Bridgerton, Downton Abbey, Mary Queen of Scots), Emmy winner (2021), COVID-19.
- Marta Rojas, 93, Cuban journalist (Granma) and writer.
- Neal Sher, 74, American lawyer.
- Bernard Tapie, 78, French businessman, politician and actor (Men, Women: A User's Manual), deputy (1989–1996) and president of Olympique de Marseille (1986–1994), stomach cancer.
- Lars Vilks, 75, Swedish visual artist, founder of Ladonia, traffic collision.

=== 4 ===
- Louise Bäckman, 94, Swedish Sámi academic.
- Roger Stuart Bacon, 95, Canadian politician, premier of Nova Scotia (1990–1991) and Nova Scotia MLA (1970–1993).
- Benedita Barata da Rocha, 72, Portuguese immunologist.
- Mohamed Ali Bouleymane, 79, Tunisian politician, mayor of Tunis (1986–1988, 1990–2000).
- Mike Connelly, 85, American football player (Dallas Cowboys).
- Sergey Danilin, 61, Russian luger, Olympic silver medallist (1984).
- Laurie Davidson, 94, New Zealand yacht designer (NZL 32).
- Eugenio Duca, 71, Italian politician, deputy (1994–2006), heart attack.
- Terry Eades, 77, Northern Irish football player (Cambridge United, Watford) and manager (Histon), cancer.
- Michael Ferguson, 84, British television director and producer (EastEnders, The Bill, Casualty).
- Willy Haeberli, 96, Swiss-born American nuclear physicist.
- John Paul Harney, 90, Canadian politician, MP (1972–1974).
- John Hastie, 83, New Zealand sport shooter.
- Edwin Holliday, 82, English footballer (Middlesbrough, Sheffield Wednesday, Hereford United).
- Bazyl Jakupov, 56, Kazakhstani politician, governor of Kostanay (2015–2019).
- Ivan Johnson, 68, Bahamian-born English cricketer (Worcestershire) and journalist.
- Alan Kalter, 78, American television announcer (Late Show with David Letterman).
- Philippe Levillain, 80, French historian and academic.
- Li Zhengming, 90, Chinese engineer, member of the Chinese Academy of Engineering.
- Zbigniew Pacelt, 70, Polish Olympic swimmer (1968, 1972) and modern pentathlete (1976).
- Budge Patty, 97, American Hall of Fame tennis player.
- Valeriy Pidluzhny, 69, Ukrainian long jumper, Olympic bronze medallist (1980).
- Eddie Robinson, 100, American baseball player (Cleveland Indians) and general manager (Texas Rangers, Atlanta Braves), World Series champion (1948).
- Sebastian Shaw, 53, Vietnamese-born American serial killer.
- Shakti Sinha, 64, Indian civil servant, director of the Nehru Memorial Museum & Library (2015–2019), cardiac arrest.
- Leonard Sullivan, 86, American politician.
- Joy Watson, 83, New Zealand children's author.
- John Welsby, 83, British rail executive, chairman of the British Railways Board (1995–1999), cancer.

=== 5 ===
- Nadia Chaudhri, 43, Pakistani-born Canadian psychologist, ovarian cancer.
- Cristóvão de Aguiar, 81, Portuguese writer.
- Siran Upendra Deraniyagala, 79, Sri Lankan archaeologist, director general of archaeology (1992–2001).
- Pat Fish, 63, English musician (The Jazz Butcher).
- Jürgen Goslar, 94, German film director (Terror After Midnight, Albino) and actor (Derrick).
- Hobo Jim, 68, American folk singer-songwriter, cancer.
- Robert Hosp, 81, Swiss footballer (Lausanne-Sport, national team).
- Abdulazeez Ibrahim, 63, Nigerian politician, senator (1999–2007).
- Ernest Lee Johnson, 61, American convicted criminal, execution by lethal injection.
- Gerald D. Jones, 88, American politician.
- Pierre Légaré, 72, Canadian comedian.
- Sid Lovett, 93, American politician.
- Lloyd McNeill, 86, American jazz flutist.
- Fathali Oveisi, 75, Iranian actor (Captain Khorshid, Hamoun, Love-stricken).
- Yosef Paritzky, 66, Israeli politician, member of the Knesset (1999–2006) and minister of national infrastructures (2003–2004).
- Barney Platts-Mills, 76, British film director (Bronco Bullfrog, Private Road).
- Nikolai Rasheyev, 86, Ukrainian film director (Bumbarash) and screenwriter (Vertical).
- Manfred Hermann Schmid, 74, German musicologist.
- Jerry Shipp, 86, American basketball player (Phillips 66ers, national team), Olympic champion (1964).
- Hester McFarland Solomon, 78, American-born British analytical psychologist.
- Pavao Štalter, 91, Croatian animator, director, and screenwriter.
- Zoran Stanković, 66, Serbian military officer and politician, minister of defence (2005–2007) and health (2011–2012), COVID-19.
- Keith Thomas, 92, English footballer (Exeter City, Plymouth Argyle, Sheffield Wednesday).
- Lynn A. Thompson, 81, American religious leader, President of the Priesthood of the Apostolic United Brethren (since 2014).
- Nikos Tsoumanis, 31, Greek footballer (Kerkyra, Panthrakikos, Apollon Pontus), suffocation.
- Pam Williams, 88, New Zealand businesswoman and philanthropist.
- Ye Keming, 84, Chinese engineer, member of the Chinese Academy of Engineering.
- Juozas Žemaitis, 95, Lithuanian Roman Catholic prelate, bishop of Vilkaviškis (1991–2002).

=== 6 ===
- Juhan Aare, 73, Estonian journalist.
- Sir Noel Anderson, 77, New Zealand judge, president of the Court of Appeal (2004–2006) and justice of the Supreme Court (2006–2008).
- Andrianafidisoa, Malagasy military officer and convicted coupist, leader of the 2006 Malagasy coup d'état attempt.
- Lou Antonelli, 64, American author.
- Tomoyasu Asaoka, 59, Japanese footballer (Nippon Kokan, Yomiuri, national team).
- Vigen Chitechyan, 80, Armenian politician and diplomat, deputy prime minister (1993–1995) and ambassador to European Union (1997–2009).
- Alvin Deutsch, 89, American copyright attorney.
- Gerald Home, 70, British actor (Return of the Jedi, London Boulevard) and puppeteer (Little Shop of Horrors), liver cancer.
- Patricia McMahon Hawkins, 72, American diplomat, ambassador to Togo (2008–2011).
- Patrick Horgan, 92, British-born American actor (Ryan's Hope, The Doctors).
- John Joiner, 87, Australian footballer (North Melbourne).
- Atta Kwami, 65, Ghanaian artist.
- Otilia Larrañaga, 89, Mexican actress (The Price of Living) and dancer.
- Muriel Lezak, 94, American neurophysicist.
- Valeriano Martínez, 60, Spanish politician, minister of finance of Galicia (since 2015) and member of the Parliament of Galicia (2016–2017, 2020–2021), cardiac arrest.
- Gunawan Maryanto, 45, Indonesian author and theater director, heart attack.
- Luisa Mattioli, 85, Italian actress (The Angel of the Alps, Mia nonna poliziotto, Romulus and the Sabines).
- John Morgan, 53, American economist.
- V. M. M. Nair, 101, Indian diplomat and civil servant, ambassador to Norway (1960–1967), Poland (1967–1971) and Morocco (1971–1975).
- Matti Puhakka, 76, Finnish politician, MP (1975–1991, 1995–1996), minister of transport (1983–1984) and labor (1987–1991), cancer.
- Sewa Singh Sekhwan, 71, Indian politician, Punjab MLA (1977–1985), liver disease.
- Oleg Seleznyov, 62, Russian politician, senator (since 2017), COVID-19.
- Martin J. Sherwin, 84, American historian and biographer (American Prometheus), Pulitzer Prize winner (2006), complications from lung cancer.
- Sheldon Stone, 75, American particle physicist.
- Arvind Trivedi, 82, Indian actor (Ramayan, Vikram Aur Betaal, Desh Re Joya Dada Pardesh Joya), MP (1991–1996), multiple organ failure.
- Ted Venetoulis, 87, American politician, Baltimore County executive (1974–1978).
- Yesudasan, 83, Indian cartoonist, founder of the Kerala Cartoon Academy.

=== 7 ===
- Azartash Azarnoosh, 83, Iranian linguist and scholar.
- Mel Boehland, 78, American football coach, complications from COVID-19.
- Clement Bowman, 91, Canadian chemical engineer.
- James Brokenshire, 53, British politician, MP (since 2005), secretary of state for Northern Ireland (2016–2018) and housing, communities and local government (2018–2019), lung cancer.
- Ray Charambura, 92, Canadian football player (Winnipeg Blue Bombers).
- Chen Wenxin, 95, Chinese biologist, member of the Chinese Academy of Sciences.
- Enzo Collotti, 92, Italian historian and academic.
- Jorge Coscia, 69, Argentine film director and politician, deputy (2005–2009).
- Jean-Daniel Flaysakier, 70, French doctor and journalist, heart failure.
- Fotini Dekazou Stefanopoulou, Greek politician, MP (1993–1996).
- Raoul Franklin, 86, British physicist and academic administrator, vice-chancellor of City, University of London (1978–1998).
- András Gálszécsy, 87, Hungarian politician, minister of civilian intelligence services (1990–1992).
- Johnny Gold, 89, British nightclub owner and promoter, co-founder of Tramp.
- Clifford Grant, 91, Australian operatic bass singer.
- Rick Jones, 84, Canadian-born British television presenter (Play School, Fingerbobs) and musician (Meal Ticket), esophageal cancer.
- Forrest Hamilton, 91, American basketball player (University of Missouri).
- David Kirby, 82, English cricketer (Cambridge University, Leicestershire).
- Étienne Mougeotte, 81, French journalist and media director, tonsil cancer.
- Deep Pal, 68, Indian cinematographer (Pehla Nasha).
- Félix Palomo, 84, Spanish politician, senator (1977–1982), member (1983–1995) and president (1983–1987, 1988–1995) of the Parliament of La Rioja.
- Reggie Parks, 87, Canadian professional wrestler (AWA) and engraver (WWE), COVID-19.
- Andy Porter, 84, Scottish footballer (Watford).
- Mike Ray, 85, Canadian politician, Ontario MPP (1987–1990).
- Eva Rönström, 88, Swedish Olympic gymnast (1956).
- Myriam Sarachik, 88, Belgian-born American experimental physicist.
- Jan Shutan, 88, American actress (Room 222, Ben Casey).
- Peter Silverman, 90, Canadian journalist.
- Jacques Simon, 83, French Olympic cyclist (1960).
- Louise Slade, 74, American food scientist.
- Jože Snoj, 87, Slovenian poet and novelist.
- Ralph Spinella, 98, American Olympic fencer (1960).
- Franklin Standard, 72, Cuban basketball player, Olympic bronze medalist (1972).
- Ronald S. Stroud, 88, Canadian historian and academic.
- Petra Zais, 64, German politician, member of the Landtag of Saxony (2014–2019).

=== 8 ===
- Pauline Bart, 91, American sociologist.
- Chang Yung-hsiang, 91, Taiwanese screenwriter (Beautiful Duckling, The Story of a Small Town, If I Were for Real).
- Nola Chilton, 99, Israeli theatre director.
- Roger de Ville, 86, English cricketer.
- Rabah Driassa, 87, Algerian painter and singer.
- Marina Galanou, Greek LGBT rights activist.
- Mordechai Geldman, 75, German-born Israeli poet and psychologist, cancer.
- Peter Gill, Pakistani politician, Punjab MPA (since 2018).
- Petru Guelfucci, 66, French singer.
- Billy Lamont, 85, Scottish football player (Hamilton Academical, Albion Rovers) and manager (East Stirlingshire).
- Owen Luder, 93, British architect.
- Tony MacMahon, 82, Irish button accordion player and radio and television broadcaster, subject of Slán leis an gCeol.
- Jack Manning, 92, New Zealand architect.
- Arthur Mattuck, 91, American mathematician.
- Jim McInally, 73, Canadian ice hockey player (Hamilton Red Wings, Nashville Dixie Flyers).
- Henri Mitterand, 93, French academic and author.
- Raymond T. Odierno, 67, American military officer, chief of staff of the Army (2011–2015), cancer.
- Richard Ohmann, 90, American literary critic.
- Ian Ormond, 72, Scottish-born New Zealand footballer (Blockhouse Bay, national team).
- Jim Pembroke, 75, English-born Finnish rock musician (Wigwam).
- Piraisoodan, 65, Indian lyricist (En Rasavin Manasile, Thayagam, Krishna Krishna).
- Anton Polyakov, 33, Ukrainian politician, MP (since 2019).
- Bob Priddy, 91, American basketball player (Baltimore Bullets).
- Grigory Sanakoev, 86, Russian chess player.
- Sandra Scarr, 85, American psychologist.
- Sanpei Shirato, 89, Japanese manga artist (Kamui), aspiration pneumonia.
- Jorge Antonio Solis, 70, American jurist, judge (1991–2016) and chief judge (2014–2016) of the U.S. District Court for Northern Texas.
- Jem Targal, 74, American bassist (Third Power) and singer-songwriter.
- Jup Weber, 71, Luxembourgish politician, MEP (1994–1999).
- Achmad Rizal Zakaria, 58, Indonesian politician, vice mayor of Mojokerto (since 2018).

=== 9 ===
- Ali Atwa, 60s, Lebanese hijacker (TWA Flight 847), cancer.
- Abolhassan Banisadr, 88, Iranian politician, president (1980–1981), minister of foreign affairs (1979) and finance (1979–1980).
- Rich Barry, 81, American baseball player (Philadelphia Phillies).
- Colin Bell, 83, Scottish journalist.
- Garnett Brown, 85, American jazz trombonist.
- Lauren Cho, 30, American music teacher and chef. (body discovered on this date)
- Chito Gascon, 57, Filipino lawyer, chairman of the Commission on Human Rights (since 2015), COVID-19.
- Maurice J. Goyette, 87, American politician.
- A. M. Harun-ar-Rashid, 88, Bangladeshi physicist.
- Helmut Herbst, 86, German film director, producer and screenwriter (Eine deutsche Revolution).
- Keitaro Hoshino, 52, Japanese boxer, WBA minimumweight champion (2000–2001, 2002).
- J. Martin Hunter, 84, British arbitration lawyer.
- Tim Johnston, 80, British Olympic long distance runner (1968).
- Farooq Feroze Khan, 82, Pakistani military officer, chief of air staff (1991–1994) and chairman joint chiefs of staff committee (1994–1997), heart attack.
- Sikandar Hayat Khan, 87, Pakistani politician, president (1991–1996) and prime minister (1985–1990, 2001–2006) of Azad Kashmir, heart disease.
- Jean Ledwith King, 97, American attorney, teacher and political activist.
- Hosea Macharinyang, 35, Kenyan runner.
- Yossi Maiman, 75, German-born Israeli banking executive, president (2002–2013) and CEO (2006–2013) of Ampal-American Israel Corporation.
- Shawn McLemore, 54, American gospel singer.
- Stephen Brendan McMahon, 66, British neuroscientist.
- Donn B. Parker, American computer scientist.
- Pierre Pinoncelli, 92, French performance artist.
- Gilbert Py, 87, French operatic tenor.
- Mario Roccuzzo, 80, American actor (The Majestic, Barney Miller, Mr. Belvedere).
- Anne Saxelby, 40, American cheesemonger.
- Germain Sengelin, 84, French judge.
- Charlotte Strandgaard, 78, Danish author.

=== 10 ===
- Granville Adams, 58, American actor (Oz, Homicide: Life on the Street, Empire), cancer.
- Beat Arnold, 43, Swiss politician, national councillor (2015–2019), brain tumor.
- Ramon Barba, 82, Filipino inventor and horticulturist.
- Alban Bensa, 73, French anthropologist.
- Richard J. Blackwell, 92, American philosopher.
- Rajnarayan Budholiya, 60, Indian politician, MP (2004–2009), heart attack.
- Ken Casanega, 100, American football player (San Francisco 49ers).
- Jim Coley, 70, American politician, member of the Tennessee House of Representatives (2007–2020).
- Toshirō Daigo, 95, Japanese judoka.
- Cornel Drăgușin, 95, Romanian football player (Steaua București) and manager (Iraq national team, Syria national team).
- Jacob E. Goodman, 87, American mathematician and composer.
- Rafiqul Haque, 84, Bangladeshi journalist (Jugantor, The Azadi, Kishore Bangla).
- Clovis Heimsath, 90, American architect.
- Bob Herron, 97, American stuntman (Spartacus, Diamonds Are Forever, Rocky) and actor, complications from a fall.
- David Kennedy, 82, American advertising executive, co-founder of Wieden+Kennedy.
- Abdul Qadeer Khan, 85, Pakistani nuclear physicist, complications from COVID-19.
- Tasos Kourakis, 73, Greek politician, MP (2007–2019).
- Joyce Lebra, 95, American historian.
- Steve Longworth, 73, English snooker player.
- Peter O'Donnell, 97, American businessman, investor, and philanthropist.
- Luis de Pablo, 91, Spanish composer (Generación del 51).
- Megan Rice, 91, American nun and nuclear disarmament activist.
- Evelyn Richter, 91, German art photographer.
- Fandas Safiullin, 85, Russian politician, deputy (2000–2003), COVID-19.
- Sathyajith, 72, Indian actor (Dhumm, Abhi, Apthamitra).
- Evi Touloupa, 97, Greek archaeologist, curator of antiquities at Acropolis.
- Ruthie Tompson, 111, American animator (Pinocchio, Fantasia, Dumbo).
- Piet Wijnberg, 63, Dutch footballer (Ajax, NEC, DS '79).

=== 11 ===
- Emiliano Aguirre, 96, Spanish paleontologist.
- Lukas David, 87, Austrian violinist.
- Tony DeMarco, 89, American Hall of Fame boxer, world welterweight champion (1955).
- Duane E. Dewey, 89, American soldier, Medal of Honor recipient.
- Emani 22, 22, American R&B singer, injuries sustained in an accident.
- Deon Estus, 65, American bassist and vocalist (Wham!, George Michael).
- Brian Goldner, 58, American business executive and film producer (Transformers, G.I. Joe), CEO of Hasbro (since 2008), cancer.
- Jack J. Grynberg, 89, Polish-born American petroleum developer.
- Kevin Hallett, 91, Australian Olympic swimmer (1948).
- Enamul Haque, 78, Bangladeshi chemist and actor (Emiler Goenda Bahini, Ei Shob Din Ratri, Amar Bondhu Rashed).
- Trevor Hemmings, 86, British football club (Cork City, Preston North End) and racehorse owner.
- Bill Hudson, 88, American politician, member of the Alaska House of Representatives (1987–1995, 1997–2003).
- Robert Introne, 79, American politician, member of the New Hampshire House of Representatives (2000–2016).
- Orphy Klempa, 70, American politician, member of the West Virginia House of Delegates (2006–2010) and Senate (2010–2012).
- George W. Knight III, 89, American minister.
- Lavoisier Maia, 93, Brazilian physician and politician, governor of Rio Grande do Norte (1979–1983), senator (1987–1995), and deputy (1999–2007).
- Muhammad Pervaiz Malik, 73, Pakistani politician, MNA (1997–1999, 2002–2007, since 2010) and minister for commerce and textile (2017–2018), cardiac arrest.
- Boris Minakov, 93, Russian diplomat, Soviet ambassador to Ivory Coast (1986–1990).
- Antônio Afonso de Miranda, 101, Brazilian Roman Catholic prelate, bishop of Taubaté (1981–1996).
- Barry Mora, 80, New Zealand operatic baritone.
- Olav Nilsen, 79, Norwegian footballer (Viking, national team).
- Gustav Ntiforo, 88, Ghanaian Olympic sprinter.
- Geert Jan van Oldenborgh, 59, Dutch climate scientist, cancer.
- Elio Pandolfi, 95, Italian actor (In Olden Days, Obiettivo ragazze, For a Few Dollars Less).
- Darby Penney, 68, American mental health worker and disability rights activist, cancer.
- Boris Pineda, 62, Salvadoran chess player.
- Ockert Potgieter, 55, South African missionary and film director, COVID-19.
- Sir John Rogers, 93, British Royal Air Force marshal.
- Ray Sullivan, 44, American politician, member of the Rhode Island House of Representatives (2005–2011).
- İsmet Uçma, 66, Turkish politician, MP (since 2011), lung cancer.
- Nedumudi Venu, 73, Indian actor (Aaravam, Thakara, Manjil Virinja Pookkal).
- Herbert L. Wilkerson, 101, American military officer, commanding general of Camp Lejeune (1972–1973).
- Stewart Murray Wilson, 74, New Zealand convicted sex offender.

=== 12 ===
- Raúl Baduel, 66, Venezuelan military officer and politician, minister of defense (2006–2008), complications from COVID-19.
- René Basset, 102, French photographer.
- Leon Black, 89, American college basketball coach (Texas Longhorns).
- Brian Boudreau, 67, Canadian politician, Nova Scotia MLA (1993–1998).
- Warren Bryant, 65, American football player (Atlanta Falcons, Los Angeles Raiders).
- Dragutin Čermak, 77, Serbian basketball player and coach, Olympic silver medalist (1968).
- Raúl Coloma, 93, Chilean footballer (Ferrobádminton, national team).
- Ricarlo Flanagan, 41, American comedian and actor (Shameless, Walk the Prank), COVID-19.
- Hubert Germain, 101, French resistance fighter and politician, mayor of Saint-Chéron, Essonne (1953–1965) and deputy (1962–1973).
- Julie L. Green, 60, American visual artist, ovarian cancer.
- Victor Gregg, 101, British author and World War II veteran.
- Sir Thomas Harris, 76, British banker and diplomat, ambassador to South Korea (1993–1997).
- Roy Horan, 71, American actor (Game of Death II, Snake in the Eagle's Shadow) and martial artist.
- Eddie Jaku, 101, German-born Australian writer and Holocaust survivor.
- Zinaida Korneva, 99, Russian military veteran and charity fundraiser.
- Renton Laidlaw, 82, British golf broadcaster and journalist, COVID-19.
- Marcus Malone, 77, American percussionist (Santana) and composer ("Soul Sacrifice").
- Vladimir Markin, 64, Russian journalist and politician.
- Paddy Moloney, 83, Irish musician (The Chieftains) and producer.
- Chie Nakane, 94, Japanese anthropologist.
- Julija Portjanko, 38, Ukrainian-born Macedonian handball player (Kometal Gjorče Petrov, Arvor 29, Macedonia national team).
- Musa al-Qarni, 67, Saudi Arabian Islamic cleric.
- Roger St. Pierre, 79, British journalist, writer and broadcaster.
- Srikanth, 81, Indian actor (Vennira Aadai, Naanal, Selva Magal).
- Kariamu Welsh, 72, American choreographer.
- Laurent Wetzel, 71, French academic and politician, general councilor of the Canton of Sartrouville (1985–1998) and mayor of Sartrouville (1989–1995).
- George Balch Wilson, 94, American composer.

=== 13 ===
- Otis Armstrong, 70, American Hall of Fame football player (Purdue Boilermakers, Denver Broncos).
- Dario Barluzzi, 86, Italian football player (Treviso, Milan) and manager (Varese).
- Timuel Black, 102, American historian and civil rights activist.
- Viktor Bryukhanov, 85, Uzbek engineer, director of the Chernobyl Nuclear Power Plant (1970–1986).
- Ray Cranch, 98, New Zealand rugby league player (Auckland, national team).
- Piero De Masi, 84, Italian diplomat, ambassador to Namibia (1990–1996).
- Ray Fosse, 74, American baseball player (Cleveland Indians, Oakland Athletics, Seattle Mariners) and broadcaster, World Series champion (1973, 1974), cancer.
- David Galliford, 96, English Anglican clergyman, bishop of Hulme (1975–1984) and Bolton (1984–1991)
- Gonario Gianoglio, 89, Italian politician, mayor of Nuoro (1966–1971).
- Girjesh Govil, 81, Indian molecular biophysicist.
- Bill Hager, 74, American politician, member of the Florida House of Representatives (2010–2018).
- Andrea Haugen, 52, German singer (Cradle of Filth), writer and model, stabbed.
- Jennifer L. Kelsey, 79, American epidemiologist.
- Dale Kildee, 92, American politician, member of the Michigan House of Representatives (1965–1974) and Senate (1975–1976) and the U.S. House of Representatives (1977–2013).
- Emmanuel de La Taille, 89, Moroccan-born French journalist and television producer, traffic collision.
- Frances Line, 81, British broadcasting executive, controller of BBC Radio 2 (1986–1996).
- Conrado Miranda, 92, Salvadoran football player (Atlético Marte, national team) and manager (Isidro Metapán), COVID-19.
- Earl Old Person, 92, American Blackfeet chief, cancer.
- Gary Paulsen, 82, American novelist (Hatchet, Dogsong, The River), cardiac arrest.
- Norm Provan, 89, Australian rugby league player (St. George Dragons, New South Wales, national team).
- Bela Rudenko, 88, Russian music educator.
- Clem Tillion, 96, American politician, member of the Alaska House of Representatives (1963–1975), member (1975–1981) and president of the senate (1979–1981).
- Agnes Tirop, 25, Kenyan Olympic long-distance runner (2020), stabbed.
- Zafar Usmanov, 84, Tajik mathematician.
- Sir Patrick Walker, 89, British civil servant, director general of MI5 (1988–1992).
- Stephen Yang Xiangtai, 98, Chinese Roman Catholic prelate, bishop of Daming (1999–2016).
- Fumio Yamamoto, 58, Japanese author, pancreatic cancer.

=== 14 ===
- Joseph Kofi Adda, 65, Ghanaian politician, MP (2003–2013) and minister of energy (2006–2008).
- Susagna Arasanz, 60, Andorran politician and economist, minister of finance (1994–2000) and general councillor (1997), cancer.
- Abu Musab al-Barnawi, Nigerian Islamic militant, leader of ISWAP (since 2016). (death announced on this date)
- Reg Beresford, 100, English footballer (Crystal Palace).
- Clint Dunford, 78, Canadian politician, Alberta MLA (1993–2008).
- Akkiraju Haragopal, 63, Indian politician, kidney failure.
- Rodney Jory, 82, Australian physicist.
- Ojārs Ēriks Kalniņš, 71, Latvian diplomat and politician, ambassador to the United States (1993–1999) and deputy (since 2010).
- Phil Leadbetter, 59, American resonator guitar player, COVID-19.
- Margo Leavin, 85, American art dealer.
- Lee Wan-koo, 71, South Korean politician, prime minister (2015), MP (1996–2004, 2013–2016) and governor of South Chungcheong Province (2006–2009), multiple myeloma.
- Tom Morey, 86, American musician, engineer, and surfboard shaper.
- Mayumi Moriyama, 93, Japanese politician, chief cabinet secretary (1989–1990), minister of education (1992–1993) and justice (2001–2003).
- Derek Pearsall, 90, British medievalist.
- Sir Gerry Robinson, 72, Irish-born British television presenter (Can Gerry Robinson Fix the NHS?) and executive, chair of Arts Council England (1998–2004).
- Sarkasi Said, 81, Singaporean batik artist.
- Raymond Setlakwe, 93, Canadian entrepreneur, lawyer and politician, senator (2000–2003).
- Vic Sison, 84, Filipino footballer (Lions, national team), COVID-19.
- Gennady Sizov, 80, Russian diplomat, ambassador to Bolivia (1998–2003).
- Traudl Stark, 91, Austrian child actress (A Mother's Love, The Fox of Glenarvon, Passion).
- Diane Weyermann, 66, American film producer (Collective, An Inconvenient Truth, RBG), lung cancer.
- Frank Zabriskie, 87, American-born Scottish astronomer.
- Marko Živić, 49, Serbian actor (Balkan Shadows, The Belgrade Phantom) and television host (Marko Živić Show), COVID-19.

=== 15 ===
- T. K. Abdullah, 92, Indian Islamic scholar.
- Tuineau Alipate, 54, Tongan-born American football player (Minnesota Vikings, Saskatchewan Roughriders, New York Jets).
- Sir David Amess, 69, British politician, MP (since 1983), stabbed.
- Leland I. Anderson, 93, American electrical engineer.
- Avi Barot, 29, Indian cricketer (Saurashtra), heart attack.
- Dan Benishek, 69, American politician, member of the U.S. House of Representatives (2011–2017).
- André Cognat, 83, French Guinean Wayana tribal chief.
- Joanna Cameron, 73, American actress (The Secrets of Isis, I Love My Wife, Pretty Maids All in a Row), stroke.
- Michel de Roy, 72, French author.
- Kihoto Hollohon, 89, Indian politician, Nagaland MLA (1977–2013).
- Farrukh Jaffar, 88, Indian actress (Umrao Jaan, What Will People Say, Gulabo Sitabo).
- Larry Koon, 77, American politician, member of the South Carolina House of Representatives (1975–2005).
- Alfredo López Austin, 85, Mexican historian.
- Pat Mintey, 74, American racing driver.
- Gabriel Moran, 86, American academic and theologian.
- Madame Nguyễn Văn Thiệu, 90, Vietnamese socialite, first lady of South Vietnam (1967–1975).
- Miguel de Oliveira, 74, Brazilian middleweight boxer, WBC light-middleweight world champion (1975), pancreatic cancer.
- Bob Peck, 92, American athletics administrator.
- Greg Pipes, 75, American football player (Edmonton Eskimos).
- Michael S. Porder, 88, American psychoanalyst and psychiatrist.
- Ottó Prouza, 88, Hungarian Olympic volleyball player (1964).
- G. K. Govinda Rao, 84, Indian actor (Grahana, Maha Parva, Malgudi Days) and writer.
- Mario Andrea Rigoni, 73, Italian poet and writer.
- Abel Rodríguez, 50, Cuban actor (El clon).
- Reinhold Roth, 68, German motorcycle racer.
- Gerd Ruge, 93, German journalist (ARD, Die Welt), author and filmmaker.
- Metro Rybchuk, 85, Canadian politician, Saskatchewan MLA (1982–1986).
- Vano Siradeghyan, 74, Armenian politician and writer, minister of internal affairs (1992–1996) and mayor of Yerevan (1996–1998).
- Pornsak Songsaeng, 60, Thai luk thung and mor lam singer, heart attack.
- Dorothy Steel, 95, American actress (Black Panther, Poms, Jumanji: The Next Level).
- Don Stonesifer, 94, American football player (Chicago Cardinals).
- Masten Wanjala, 20, Kenyan suspected serial killer, beaten.
- Dave Washington, 73, American football player (Denver Broncos, Buffalo Bills, San Francisco 49ers).

=== 16 ===
- Dwight W. Allen, 90, American social scientist.
- Robert Bainbridge, 90, English footballer (York City, Frickley Athletic, Selby Town).
- Paul Blanca, 62, Dutch art photographer.
- Leo Boivin, 89, Canadian Hall of Fame ice hockey player (Boston Bruins, Toronto Maple Leafs, Pittsburgh Penguins) and coach.
- Denise Bryer, 93, British voice actress (Terrahawks, Return to Oz, Labyrinth).
- Felipe Cazals, 84, Mexican film director (The Garden of Aunt Isabel, Canoa: A Shameful Memory, Bajo la metralla), screenwriter and producer.
- José Ramón Ceschi, 80, Argentine Roman Catholic priest, writer, and television presenter.
- Geoffrey Chater, 100, British actor (Mapp & Lucia, Callan, Barry Lyndon).
- Wes Cooley, 65, American motorcycle road racer, complications from diabetes.
- Peter Dickson, 92, British historian.
- Sir Joseph Dwyer, 82, British civil engineer and businessman.
- Dennis Franks, 68, American football player (Philadelphia Eagles, Detroit Lions).
- Brian Gassaway, 49, American mixed martial artist (UFC).
- Reginald Green, 86, American development economist.
- Frank Hargrove, 94, American politician, member of the Virginia House of Delegates (1982–2010).
- Alan Hawkshaw, 84, British composer (Grange Hill, Countdown, Channel 4 News) and keyboard player, pneumonia.
- Kevin Hevey, 98, Australian footballer (Hawthorn).
- Roger Hui, 67, Canadian computer scientist, co-developer of J.
- George Kinnell, 83, Scottish footballer (Aberdeen, Stoke City, Sunderland).
- Viktor Kryzhanivsky, 59, Ukrainian diplomat, ambassador extraordinary and plenipotentiary of Ukraine, fall.
- Betty Lynn, 95, American actress (The Andy Griffith Show, Cheaper by the Dozen, Meet Me in Las Vegas).
- Máire Mhac an tSaoi, 99, Irish poet and linguist.
- Freddie Joe Nunn, 59, American football player (Arizona Cardinals, Indianapolis Colts).
- Hiroshi Ono, 64, Japanese pixel artist (Namco).
- Joseph M. Palmaccio, American audio engineer.
- Achille Perilli, 94, Italian painter and sculptor.
- Jean Rochon, 83, Canadian politician, Quebec MNA (1994–2003).
- Coleta de Sabata, 86, Romanian engineer, rector of Politehnica University of Timișoara (1981–1989).
- Paul Salata, 94, American football player (San Francisco 49ers, Baltimore Colts) and actor (Angels in the Outfield).
- Pat Studstill, 83, American football player (Detroit Lions, Los Angeles Rams, New England Patriots).
- Ron Tutt, 83, American drummer (Elvis Presley, Neil Diamond, Roy Orbison).

=== 17 ===
- Ahmad Shah Ahmadzai, 77, Afghan politician, acting prime minister (1995–1996).
- Laila al-Atrash, 73, Jordanian writer and journalist.
- Sergio Berlinguer, 87, Italian politician and diplomat, secretary general of the Presidency (1987–1992).
- William Bleakes, 88, Northern Irish politician.
- Anders Bodelsen, 84, Danish writer.
- Chuck Bundrant, 79, American businessman, co-founder and chairman of Trident Seafoods.
- Bruce Gaston, 74, American Thai classical musician, liver cancer.
- Nina Gruzintseva, 87, Russian Olympic sprint canoer (1964).
- Hido, 52, Japanese professional wrestler (FMW).
- Toshihiro Iijima, 89, Japanese film director (Ultra Q, Ultraman, Daigoro vs. Goliath) and screenwriter, aspiration pneumonia.
- Brendan Kennelly, 85, Irish poet.
- Abdul Jamil Khan, 91, Pakistani doctor and hospital chairman.
- Charlie Kulp, 96, American aerobatic pilot.
- David M. Livingston, 80, American physician.
- Mahipal Maderna, 69, Indian politician, Rajasthan MLA (2003–2013), cancer.
- Mike McCoy, 73, American petroleum engineer.
- Owen Medlock, 83, English footballer (Chelmsford City, Chelsea, Oxford United).
- Walter Nance, 88, American academic.
- Pamela Rose, 103, British actress.
- Ernie Ross, 79, British politician, MP (1979–2005).
- Floyd Salas, 90, American novelist and social activist.
- Léon Vandermeersch, 93, French sinologist.
- Kenneth Wilkinson, 90, Irish Anglican priest.
- Robin Wood, 77, Paraguayan comic book writer (Nippur de Lagash, Dago).
- Margaret York, 80, American police officer.

=== 18 ===
- Jack Angel, 90, American voice actor (Voltron, The Transformers, A.I. Artificial Intelligence).
- Christopher Ayres, 56, American voice actor (Dragon Ball, One Piece, Black Butler), complications from COPD.
- Manuel Batakian, 91, Greek Armenian Catholic hierarch, eparch of the U.S. and Canada (2005–2011).
- Val Bisoglio, 95, American actor (Saturday Night Fever, The Frisco Kid, Quincy, M.E.), Lewy body dementia.
- Serhiy Burimenko, 51, Ukrainian footballer (Artania, Naftokhimik Kremenchuk, Evis Mykolaiv).
- Ralph Carmichael, 94, American composer (The Blob, My Mother the Car) and arranger (Nat King Cole).
- Raymond Castellani, 88, American actor (Adam-12).
- Franco Cerri, 95, Italian jazz guitarist.
- Maxine Conder, 95, American Navy rear admiral, director, Navy Nurse Corps (1975–1979).
- Jo-Carroll Dennison, 97, American pageant winner (Miss America 1942) and actress (Winged Victory, The Jolson Story), COPD.
- Jaroslav Dočkal, 81, Czech football player (AC Sparta Prague, FK Teplice) and coach.
- David Finn, 100, American public relations executive and photographer, co-founder of Ruder Finn.
- Fred Goodall, 83, New Zealand cricket umpire.
- Edita Gruberová, 74, Slovak operatic soprano.
- Philippe Hadengue, 89, French writer and painter.
- Willy Kemp, 95, Luxembourgish road bicycle racer.
- Sami Kohen, 93, Turkish journalist (Milliyet, The New York Times).
- János Kornai, 93, Hungarian economist.
- Werner Lambersy, 79, Belgian poet.
- William Lucking, 80, American actor (Sons of Anarchy, The Rundown, The Magnificent Seven Ride!).
- Pamela McCorduck, 80, English-born American author and journalist.
- Vamona Navelcar, 91, Indian painter.
- Manuel Neri, 91, American sculptor.
- Miguel Palmer, 78, Mexican actor (Bodas de odio, Dos hogares).
- Colin Powell, 84, American general and politician, chairman of the Joint Chiefs of Staff (1989–1993) and secretary of state (2001–2005), complications from COVID-19.
- Sukhdev Rajbhar, 70, Indian politician, Uttar Pradesh MLA (1991–1995, 2002–2012, since 2017).
- Shankar Rao, 84, Indian actor.
- Charles Ryan, 94, American politician, mayor of Springfield, Massachusetts (1962–1967, 2004–2008).
- Sean Wainui, 25, New Zealand rugby union player (Taranaki, Chiefs, Māori All Blacks), traffic collision.
- Bandula Warnapura, 68, Sri Lankan cricketer (Bloomfield, national team).
- Xu Qin, 93, Chinese politician, delegate to the National People's Congress (1978–1998).
- Bill Zeliff, 85, American politician, member of the U.S. House of Representatives (1991–1997).

=== 19 ===
- Kjersti Alveberg, 73, Norwegian dancer and choreographer.
- Dulce Beatriz, 90, Cuban-born American artist.
- Abdelouahed Belkeziz, 82, Moroccan diplomat, minister of foreign affairs (1983–1985) and general secretary of OIC (2001–2004).
- Leslie Bricusse, 90, British composer (Willy Wonka & the Chocolate Factory), lyricist ("Goldfinger", "You Only Live Twice") and playwright, Oscar winner (1968, 1983).
- Patrick Byrne, 96, Irish politician, TD (1956–1969).
- Antonio Coggio, 82, Italian composer, arranger, and record producer.
- Michel Degand, 86, French artist.
- Bob Graham, 85, New Zealand rugby union player and coach (Auckland, Junior All Blacks).
- Tamara Gudima, 85, Russian politician, deputy (1993–2000).
- Pierre Kerkhoffs, 85, Dutch footballer (SC Enschede, PSV, national team).
- Sir Archie Lamb, 99, British fighter pilot and diplomat, ambassador to Norway (1978–1980).
- Branko Mamula, 100, Serbian politician and military officer, minister of defence of Yugoslavia (1982–1988), COVID-19.
- Michel Nadeau, 74, Canadian administrator and journalist.
- Tullis Onstott, 66, American geologist, complications from lung cancer.
- Donald Lewis Shaw, 84, American communication scholar.
- Gary Summerhays, 71, Canadian boxer.
- Bernard Tiphaine, 83, French actor.
- G. Ware Travelstead, 83, American property developer and entrepreneur.

=== 20 ===
- Ray Allsopp, 87, Australian footballer (Richmond, Victoria).
- Carlo Amato, 83, Italian-born Sammarinese-American businessman and diplomat, ambassador of the Sovereign Military Order of Malta to St. Lucia and St. Vincent and the Grenadines (since 1983).
- Pat Campbell, 61, American talk radio host (KFAQ), brain cancer.
- Mihaly Csikszentmihalyi, 87, Hungarian-American psychologist (flow state concept).
- Nick Dimitri, 88, American stuntman (Hard Times, The Rat Patrol) and actor (Out for Justice).
- Douglas Ewald, 84, American politician, member of the Minnesota House of Representatives (1975–1983).
- Dino Felisetti, 102, Italian politician and lawyer, deputy (1972–1987).
- Jean Fenn, 93, American operatic soprano.
- Walter Gratzer, 89, German-born British biophysical chemist.
- Tom Hannegan, 51, American politician, member of the Missouri House of Representatives (since 2017), stroke.
- Dave Harper, 55, American football player (Dallas Cowboys, Ottawa Roughriders), complications from COVID-19.
- Hans Haselböck, 93, Austrian organist and composer.
- Trevor Heath, 69, Australian footballer (Essendon, West Perth, Subiaco).
- Miguel La Fay Bardi, 86, American-born Peruvian Roman Catholic prelate, territorial prelate of Sicuani (1999–2013).
- Michael Laughlin, 82, American film director (Strange Invaders), producer (Two-Lane Blacktop), and writer (Town & Country), complications from COVID-19.
- Robert H. MacQuarrie, 86, Canadian politician, Northwest Territories MLA (1979–1987).
- Dragan Pantelić, 69, Serbian footballer (Radnički Niš, Bordeaux, Yugoslavia national team), COVID-19.
- Proterios Pavlopoulos, 75, Greek Orthodox prelate.
- Jerry Pinkney, 81, American illustrator (John Henry, The Talking Eggs: A Folktale from the American South) and children's writer (The Lion & the Mouse), heart attack.
- Eudora Quartey-Koranteng, Ghanaian diplomat, ambassador extraordinaire to Italy (since 2019), cardiac arrest.
- Gabriel Reymond, 98, Swiss Olympic racewalker.
- Dennis J. Roberts II, 80, American politician.
- Horacio A. Tenorio, 86, Mexican Latter-day Saints general authority, member of the Second Quorum of the Seventy (1989–1994).
- Bjorn Thorsrud, 58, American music producer, programmer, and audio engineer.
- Robert Thurston, 84, American science fiction author.
- Barry Turner, 75, Canadian politician, MP (1984–1988), cancer.
- Sardar Muhammad Yaqoob, Pakistani politician, deputy speaker of the National Assembly (2002–2007).
- Nyapanyapa Yunupingu, 76, Australian Yolngu painter.

=== 21 ===
- Yasin Abu Bakr, 80, Trinidadian Islamic leader (Jamaat al Muslimeen) and coupist, leader of the Jamaat al Muslimeen coup attempt.
- George Butler, 78, British-American filmmaker (Pumping Iron, The Endurance: Shackleton's Legendary Antarctic Expedition, Going Upriver), pneumonia.
- William G. Conway, 91, American zoologist, ornithologist and conservationist.
- Jean-Jacques Duval, 91, French-born American artist.
- Einár, 19, Swedish rapper, shot.
- Frank E. Eulner, 57–58, American sound engineer (Iron Man, Saving Private Ryan, Dinosaur).
- Kathy Flores, 66, American rugby union player (national team), colon cancer.
- Hartmut Geerken, 82, German author, musician and composer.
- Gurie Georgiu, 52, Romanian Orthodox bishop of Deva and Hunedoara (since 2009), COVID-19.
- Bernard Haitink, 92, Dutch conductor (Royal Concertgebouw Orchestra, Chicago Symphony Orchestra) and opera artistic director (Royal Opera House).
- Hassan Hanafi, 86, Egyptian philosopher.
- Martha Henry, 83, American-born Canadian actress (The Wars, Dancing in the Dark, Mustard Bath).
- István Herman, 74, Hungarian politician, MP (2010–2014).
- Halyna Hutchins, 42, Ukrainian-American cinematographer (Archenemy, Darlin', Rust), accidental shooting.
- Pierre Jamjian, 72, Lebanese actor.
- Michihiko Kano, 79, Japanese politician, MP (1976–1979, 2005–2012) and minister of agriculture (2010–2012).
- Tigran Karapetyan, 76, Armenian politician, chairman of the People's Party.
- Vladimir Karolev, 60, Bulgarian politician and economist, member of the Municipal Council of Sofia (2003–2011).
- Simon Lewty, 80, English artist.
- Wes Magee, 82, British poet and children's author.
- Robin McNamara, 74, American singer-songwriter ("Lay a Little Lovin' on Me") and musician.
- Billy Moran, 87, American baseball player (Los Angeles Angels, Cleveland Indians).
- Jarosław Musiał, 58–59, Polish comic book artist (Fantastyka, Magia i Miecz, Fenix).
- Hertz Nazaire, 48, Haitian-born American visual artist, complications from sickle cell disease.
- Kamela Portuges, 58, American puppeteer (Bicentennial Man, James and the Giant Peach, Being John Malkovich), pulmonary embolism.
- Žarko Potočnjak, 75, Croatian actor (Visitors from the Galaxy, The Glembays, Go, Yellow).
- Quandra Prettyman, 88, American academic.
- Tom Samek, 71, Czech-born Australian artist.
- Bima Stagg, 76, American screenwriter (Inside, Stander) and actor (Beauty No. 1).
- Saori Sugimoto, 56, Japanese voice actress (Shima Shima Tora no Shimajirō), heart failure.
- Thích Phổ Tuệ, 104, Vietnamese Buddhist monk.
- Jean Verdun, 90, French writer and Freemasonry grand master.
- Anđelko Vuletić, 88, Croatian-Bosnian poet and novelist.

=== 22 ===
- K. A. Abraham, 79, Indian cardiologist and writer.
- Janali Akbarov, 81, Azerbaijani mugham singer.
- Lilli Alanen, 80, Finnish philosopher.
- Lía Bermúdez, 91, Venezuelan sculptor.
- Jay Black, 82, American singer (Jay and the Americans), pneumonia.
- Dave Cuzens, 88, Australian footballer (Richmond).
- Adolfo J. de Bold, 79, Argentinian-Canadian cardiovascular researcher.
- Cap Dierks, 89, American politician, member of the Nebraska Legislature (1987–2003, 2007–2011).
- Irshat Fakhritdinov, 56, Russian politician, deputy (2007–2016), COVID-19.
- Ryszard Filipski, 87, Polish actor (Hubal, An Ancient Tale: When the Sun Was a God) and theatre and film director.
- Valentin Gapontsev, 82, Russian-American businessman, founder of IPG Photonics.
- Ju Gau-jeng, 67, Taiwanese politician, member of the Legislative Yuan (1987–1999), colorectal cancer.
- Vibjörn Karlén, 84, Swedish geographer and geologist.
- Vera Kuzmina, 97, Russian actress and Chuvash activist.
- Dalma Mádl, 88, Hungarian socialite, first lady (2000–2005).
- Nabiel Makarim, 75, Indonesian politician, minister of the environment (2001–2004).
- Serhiy Morozov, 71, Ukrainian football player (Zorya Luhansk, CSKA Moscow) and manager (Vorskla Poltava), COVID-19.
- Álex Quiñónez, 32, Ecuadorian Olympic sprinter (2012), shot.
- Joan Ringelheim, 82, American oral history archive director (USHMM), breast cancer.
- Peter Scolari, 66, American actor (Newhart, Bosom Buddies, Girls), Emmy winner (2016), leukemia.
- Vyacheslav Vedenin, 80, Russian cross-country skier, Olympic champion (1972).
- Vera Venczel, 75, Hungarian actress (Stars of Eger, The Toth Family).
- Sara Wilford, 89, American psychologist.
- Udo Zimmermann, 78, German composer (Weiße Rose, Der Schuhu und die fliegende Prinzessin), musicologist, and opera director.

=== 23 ===
- Mick Allan, 83, Australian Olympic rower (1956, 1960, 1964).
- Willie Aspinall, 78, English rugby league player (Warrington, Rochdale Hornets).
- Mark Barrington-Ward, 93, British newspaper editor (Oxford Mail).
- Moncef Besbes, 71, Tunisian Olympic handball player.
- Marcel Bluwal, 96, French film director (Carom Shots, The New Adventures of Vidocq) and screenwriter.
- Fabrizio Calvi, 67, French investigative journalist (Libération) and writer, assisted suicide.
- Nishat Khan Daha, 73, Pakistani politician, Punjab MPA (since 2008).
- Alfredo Diez Nieto, 103, Cuban composer and conductor.
- Frank, 18, Asian water monitor and animal actor (Jessie).
- Theodore H. Geballe, 101, American physicist.
- V. Govindan, 80, Indian politician, Tamil Nadu MLA (1989–1991, 1996–2001).
- Abdelbaki Hermassi, 83, Tunisian politician, minister of foreign affairs (2004–2005).
- Jim Malone, 95, Australian footballer (North Melbourne).
- Minoo Mumtaz, 79, Indian actress (Kaagaz Ke Phool, Sahib Bibi Aur Ghulam, Gazal) and dancer, cancer.
- Bob Neumeier, 70, American sportscaster (WBZ-TV, ESPN, NBC Sports), heart failure.
- George Olesen, 60, Danish weightlifter.
- Jiří Opavský, 90, Czech Olympic cyclist (1956).
- Peter Pharoah, 87, British public health scientist, dementia.
- Carolyn Pollan, 84, American politician, member of the Arkansas House of Representatives (1975–1999).
- Valentyna Rakytianska, 73, Ukrainian librarian, director of the Kharkiv Korolenko State Scientific Library.
- Aleksandr Rogozhkin, 72, Russian film director (Peculiarities of the National Hunt, Operation Happy New Year, The Cuckoo) and writer.
- Sir Michael Rutter, 88, British child psychiatrist.
- Vishaka Siriwardana, 65, Sri Lankan actress, (Christhu Charithaya, Bheeshanaye Athuru Kathawak), cancer.
- Cyrille Tahay, 82, Belgian politician, member of the Parliament of Wallonia (1995-1999).
- Sirkka Turkka, 82, Finnish poet.
- Grant Woods, 67, American politician, Arizona attorney general (1991–1999), heart attack.

=== 24 ===
- Fredrik Andersson Hed, 49, Swedish golfer, cancer.
- Richard C. Banks, 90, American author and ornithologist.
- Arved Birnbaum, 59, German actor (We Are the Night).
- Bùi Diễm, 98, Vietnamese diplomat, ambassador of South Vietnam to the United States (1965–1972).
- Erna de Vries, 98, German Holocaust survivor and lecturer.
- Sir John Morrison Forbes, 96, British Royal Navy admiral, Flag Officer, Plymouth (1977–1979).
- Gene Freidman, 50, Russian-American taxi executive, heart attack.
- Arnold Hano, 99, American novelist, biographer and journalist.
- Mike Hoffmann, 67, American guitarist and record producer, pulmonary embolism.
- Laura Mays Hoopes, 78, American biologist.
- Muhammad Hudori, 53, Indonesian bureaucrat, secretary-general of the Ministry of Home Affairs (since 2020).
- Keith Kerr, 90, American brigadier general and gay rights activist.
- Mamat Khalid, 58, Malaysian screenwriter and director (Puteri Gunung Ledang, Zombi Kampung Pisang, Hantu Kak Limah).
- Krzysztof Kiersznowski, 70, Polish actor (Vabank, Fever, The Mighty Angel).
- Carl Madsen, 71, American football official.
- Abdul Rahim Majzoob, 86, Pakistani Pashto poet, writer, and jurist.
- John Murton, 79, Australian footballer (Collingwood).
- Indira Nath, 83, Indian immunologist.
- Sonny Osborne, 83, American bluegrass musician (Osborne Brothers) and banjo player, stroke.
- Chandrishan Perera, 60, Sri Lankan rugby union player (national team).
- Denis Teofikov, 21, Bulgarian pop-folk singer, fall.
- John Traynor, 73, Irish criminal, cancer.
- Sunao Tsuboi, 96, Japanese hibakusha, anti-nuclear and anti-war activist.
- James Michael Tyler, 59, American actor (Friends, Motel Blue), prostate cancer.

=== 25 ===
- Zack Cernovsky, 74, Canadian psychologist.
- Abdelmajid Chaker, 94, Tunisian politician, deputy (1959–1974).
- Willie Cobbs, 89, American blues singer, harmonica player and songwriter ("You Don't Love Me").
- Fofi Gennimata, 56, Greek politician, MP (2000–2002, 2012, since 2015) and president of the PASOK (since 2015), cancer.
- Jean-Claude Guibal, 80, French politician, deputy (1997–2017) and mayor of Menton (since 1989), heart attack.
- Herbie Herbert, 73, American music manager (Journey, Roxette, Europe) and musician.
- Paul D. House, 78, Canadian fast food executive, COO (1992–2005), CEO (2005–2008), and president (1995–2013) of Tim Hortons.
- Anna Jekiełek, 83, Polish set and costume designer.
- Fernando Herrera Mamani, 55, Peruvian politician, congressman (since 2021).
- Berry Mayall, 85, British sociologist and academic, cancer.
- Ivy Nicholson, 88, American model and actress.
- Gerard Phalen, 87, Canadian politician, senator (2001–2009).
- Patrick Reyntiens, 95, British stained glass artist.
- Eeileen Romero, 47, Salvadoran politician and disability rights activist, deputy (2018–2021), cardiac arrest.
- Aleksandar Shalamanov, 80, Bulgarian footballer (Slavia Sofia, national team) and Olympic alpine skier (1960).
- Sudi Silalahi, 72, Indonesian politician and lieutenant general, secretary of state (2009–2014).
- Tim Thompson, 97, American baseball player (Brooklyn Dodgers, Kansas City Athletics, Detroit Tigers).

=== 26 ===
- Albie Bates, 80, South African rugby union player (Western Transvaal, Northern Transvaal, national team) and coach.
- Gilberto Braga, 75, Brazilian screenwriter (Escrava Isaura, Dancin' Days, Água Viva), esophagus perforation.
- Linda Carlson, 76, American actress (The Beverly Hillbillies, Murder One, Kaz), complications from amyotrophic lateral sclerosis.
- Umberto Colombo, 88, Italian footballer (Juventus, Atalanta, national team).
- Joe Lee Dunn, 75, American college football player and coach (New Mexico Lobos, Ole Miss Rebels).
- James L. Emery, American politician, member of the New York State Assembly (1965–1982) and administrator of the St. Lawrence Seaway Development Corporation (1984–1991).
- Lester Eriksson, 78, Swedish Olympic swimmer (1964, 1968).
- Bruce Flick, 88, Australian Olympic basketball player (1956).
- Tiemen Groen, 75, Dutch Olympic cyclist (1964).
- Guan Dee Koh Hoi, 67, Malaysian politician, senator (since 2020), COVID-19.
- Robert Janz, 88, Northern Irish-born American visual artist.
- Bobby Kline, 92, American baseball player (Washington Senators).
- Miguel Leal, 60, Portuguese Olympic equestrian (1996).
- Mike Lucci, 81, American football player (Cleveland Browns, Detroit Lions).
- Rose Lee Maphis, 98, American country singer.
- Nawaf Massalha, 77, Israeli politician, member of the Knesset (1988–2003), complications from COVID-19.
- Richard McCray, 83, American astronomer and astrophysicist.
- Ludovica Modugno, 72, Italian actress (Cado dalle nubi, Quo Vado?, Magical Nights) and voice actress.
- Vic Naismith, 85, Australian footballer (Richmond).
- Đuro Perić, 91, Serbian politician, MP (2008–2012, since 2020), COVID-19.
- Roh Tae-woo, 88, South Korean politician, president (1988–1993), minister of home affairs (1982–1983) and sports (1982).
- Uri Rubin, 77, Israeli Islamic scholar.
- Mort Sahl, 94, Canadian-born American comedian and actor (In Love and War, All the Young Men).
- Walter Smith, 73, Scottish football player (Dundee United) and manager (Rangers, national team).
- Lil Terselius, 76, Swedish actress (Games of Love and Loneliness), intracranial hemorrhage.
- Glen Tuckett, 93, American college baseball coach and athletic director (BYU Cougars).
- Isabel Turner, 85, British-born Canadian politician, mayor of Kingston, Ontario (2000–2003), pneumonia.
- Russell Woolf, 57, Australian radio presenter (ABC Radio Perth).

=== 27 ===
- Sandy Carmichael, 77, Scottish rugby union player (West of Scotland, Scotland national team, British & Irish Lions).
- William Cook, 57, American computer scientist (AppleScript).
- Aramesh Dustdar, 90, Iranian philosopher.
- Bob Ferry, 84, American basketball player (Detroit Pistons, St. Louis Hawks) and executive (Washington Bullets).
- Bettina Gaus, 64, German journalist (Deutsche Welle, Der Spiegel).
- Tyler Herron, 35, American baseball player (Palm Beach Cardinals).
- Russell Jennings, 66, American politician, member of the Kansas House of Representatives (since 2013), cancer.
- Gun Jönsson, 91, Swedish actress (Harry Munter, A Guy and a Gal).
- Ahmad Kamal Abdullah, 80, Malaysian poet and writer.
- William J. Lennarz, 87, American biochemist.
- Gay McIntyre, 88, British jazz musician.
- Bernd Nickel, 72, German footballer (Eintracht Frankfurt, Young Boys, West Germany national team).
- Jacek Niedźwiedzki, 70, Polish tennis player and coach.
- Per T. Ohlsson, 63, Swedish journalist (Lundagård, Expressen, Sydsvenskan).
- Arnošt Pazdera, 92, Czech footballer (Sparta Prague, FK Teplice, Czechoslovakia national team).
- Isaías Pérez Saldaña, 72, Spanish politician, member of the Parliament of Andalusia (1990–2008), and mayor of Ayamonte (1991–1996).
- Wakefield Poole, 85, American dancer, choreographer, and adult filmmaker (Boys in the Sand, Bijou).
- Salem Nanjundaiah Subba Rao, 92, Indian social worker, cardiac arrest.
- Jonathan Reynolds, 79, American screenwriter (Micki & Maude, My Stepmother Is an Alien, Leonard Part 6) and playwright, organ failure.
- P. J. Rhodes, 81, British academic and ancient historian.
- Abba Sayyadi Ruma, 59, Nigerian politician, minister of agriculture (2007–2010).
- Paul Smart, 78, English short circuit motorcycle road racer, traffic collision.
- Christopher Wenner, 66, British-East Timorese journalist (Channel 4 News) and television presenter (Blue Peter), throat cancer.
- Gerald R. Young, American intelligence official, deputy director of the National Security Agency (1988–1990).
- Ludovic Zanoni, 86, Romanian Olympic cyclist (1960).
- Peter Zelinka, 64, Slovak Olympic biathlete (1980, 1984).

=== 28 ===
- Ali Baghbanbashi, 97, Iranian Olympic long-distance runner (1952, 1956).
- Boris Binkovski, 76, German footballer (Maribor). (death announced on this date)
- Lisa Brodyaga, 81, American human rights activist.
- Pavel Coruț, 72, Romanian writer and intelligence officer.
- Jorge Cumbo, 78, Argentine quena player (Los Incas), cancer.
- Raša Đelmaš, 71, Serbian rock musician (YU Grupa, Zebra, Pop Mašina).
- John Marion Grant, 60, American convict, execution by lethal injection.
- Uwe Grimm, 58, German mathematician and physicist.
- Ann Tukey Harrison, 83, American academic.
- Linwood Holton, 98, American politician, governor of Virginia (1970–1974).
- Calvin Jones, 70, American football player (Denver Broncos).
- Rama Khandwala, 94, Indian Army officer and tour guide.
- Raymond Guy LeBlanc, 76, Canadian musician and poet.
- Florence Alice Lubega, 103, Ugandan politician, MP (1962–1980).
- Bill Luckett, 73, American politician.
- Olena Lytovchenko, 58, Ukrainian writer, COVID-19.
- Jovita Moore, 54, American news anchor (WSB-TV), brain cancer.
- M. Krishnan Nair, 81, Indian oncologist, founding director of the Thiruvananthapuram RCC.
- N. Nanmaran, 74, Indian politician, Tamil Nadu MLA (2001–2011), cardiac arrest.
- Francesco de Notaris, 77, Italian politician, senator (1994–1996) and journalist.
- João da Paula, 91, Portuguese Olympic rower (1952).
- Reinaldo Pared Pérez, 65, Dominican politician, deputy (1998–2002), member (since 2006) and president (2006–2014, 2016–2020) of the senate, suicide by gunshot.
- Cecil Perkins, 80, American baseball player (New York Yankees).
- Sir Peter Petrie, 5th Baronet, 89, British diplomat, ambassador to Belgium (1985–1989).
- Jim Pollock, 91, Canadian politician, Ontario MPP (1981–1990).
- Elaine Romagnoli, 79, American businesswoman.
- Camille Saviola, 71, American actress (The Purple Rose of Cairo, Addams Family Values, Star Trek: Deep Space Nine), heart failure.
- Sir Thomas Minshull Stockdale, 2nd Baronett, 81, British barrister.
- Dick Szymanski, 89, American football player and executive (Baltimore Colts).
- Pat Thibaudeau, 89, American politician.
- Mike Trivisonno, 74, American radio broadcaster (WTAM).
- Davy Tweed, 61, Irish rugby union player (national team) and politician, Ballymena Borough councillor (1997–2015), traffic collision.
- Miklós Zelei, 72, Hungarian poet, writer and journalist.
- Victor V. Zhenchenko, 85, Ukrainian poet, translator and singer.

=== 29 ===
- Kit Berry, British author.
- Geraldo Brindeiro, 73, Brazilian jurist, prosecutor general (1995–2003), COVID-19.
- Mehdi Cerbah, 68, Algerian footballer (JS Kabylie, RC Kouba, national team).
- Iran Darroudi, 85, Iranian artist, cardiac arrest from COVID-19.
- Dean Derby, 86, American football player (Pittsburgh Steelers, Minnesota Vikings).
- Gustave Diamond, 93, American jurist, judge (since 1978) and chief judge (1992–1994) of the U.S. District Court for Western Pennsylvania.
- Malcolm Dome, 66, English music journalist (Record Mirror, Kerrang!, Metal Hammer).
- Reidar Due, 98, Norwegian politician, MP (1977–1989) and county governor of Sør-Trøndelag (1986–1993).
- José Antonio González i Casanova, 85, Spanish jurist, academic and politician, stroke.
- Broderick Adé Hogue, 32, American art director.
- Gari Ledyard, 89, American scholar, complications from Alzheimer's disease.
- Józef Lewicki, 87, Polish Olympic swimmer.
- Herwig Maehler, 86, German papyrologist.
- Eliyahu Matza, 86, Israeli judge, justice of the Supreme Court (1991–2005).
- Ashley Mallett, 76, Australian cricketer (South Australia, national team).
- Aleksandr Martyshkin, 78, Russian rower, Olympic bronze medallist (1968).
- Charles D. Metcalf, 88, American major general and museum director (National Museum of the United States Air Force).
- Raoul Middleman, 86, American painter.
- Clément Mouamba, 77, Congolese politician, prime minister (2016–2021), minister of finance (1992–1994), COVID-19.
- Alina Obidniak, 90, Polish theatre director and actress.
- Octavio Ocaña, 22, Mexican actor (Vecinos, Lola: Once Upon a Time, La mexicana y el güero), shot.
- Yoshiko Ōta, 89, Japanese voice actress (Doraemon, Himitsu no Akko-chan, Choudenshi Bioman), heart failure.
- Bettina Plevan, 75, American lawyer, acute myeloma leukemia.
- Puneeth Rajkumar, 46, Indian actor (Appu, Abhi, Maurya), heart attack.
- Jim Small, 88, Australian politician, New South Wales MLA (1985–1999).
- Renato Zanettovich, 100, Italian violinist.

=== 30 ===
- Pepi Bader, 80, German bobsledder, Olympic silver medallist (1968, 1972).
- G. S. Bali, 67, Indian politician, Himachal Pradesh MLA (1998–2017), complications from kidney transplant.
- Harris Berman, 83, American physician, dean of Tufts University School of Medicine (2009–2019).
- Lila Greengrass Blackdeer, 89, American basketmaker.
- Alan Davidson, 92, Australian Hall of Fame cricketer (New South Wales, national team).
- René Donoyan, 81, French football player (AS Saint-Étienne, FC Nantes) and manager (FC Nantes II).
- Tony Featherstone, 72, Canadian ice hockey player (Oakland/California Golden Seals, Minnesota North Stars, Toronto Toros).
- Maurice Frilot, 80, American Olympic boxer (1964).
- Eric Greif, 59, American band manager and lawyer.
- Roger Jenkins, 81, Welsh powerboat racer, heart failure.
- Göran Johansson, 64, Swedish Olympic rower (1980).
- Daniel Jolliffe, 57, Canadian media artist, suicide.
- Valeriy Khmelko, 82, Ukrainian sociologist.
- Vyacheslav Khrynin, 84, Russian basketball player, Olympic silver medallist (1964).
- Igor Kirillov, 89, Russian news anchor (CT USSR), COVID-19.
- Bernard Malango, 79–80, Zambian Anglican prelate, archbishop of Central Africa (2001–2006).
- Valentina Malyavina, 80, Russian actress (Ivan's Childhood, A Literature Lesson, King Stag).
- Crossbelt Mani, 86, Indian film director (Midumidukki, Manushyabandhangal, Nadeenadanmare Avasyamundu).
- Gilberto Milani, 89, Italian Grand Prix motorcycle road racer.
- Basílio do Nascimento, 71, East Timorese Roman Catholic prelate, bishop of Baucau (since 2004), heart attack.
- Bert Newton, 83, Australian television presenter (In Melbourne Tonight, Good Morning Australia, Bert's Family Feud).
- Holger Obermann, 85, German footballer and journalist (Sportschau), COVID-19.
- Francisco Ou, 81, Taiwanese diplomat, minister of foreign affairs (2008–2009), ambassador to Guatemala (1990–1996, 2002–2008) and Nicaragua (1984–1985), pneumonia.
- O.Y.G Redrum 781, 49, American rapper, bone cancer.
- Jerry Remy, 68, American baseball player (California Angels, Boston Red Sox) and broadcaster (NESN), cancer.
- Gladys del Río, 79, Chilean actress and comedian.
- Justus Rosenberg, 100, Polish-born American educator, Resistance member during World War II.
- Ron Serafini, 67, American ice hockey player (California Golden Seals).
- Sonia Sheridan, 96, American artist.
- Lafayette Stribling, 87, American basketball coach (Mississippi Valley State University, Tougaloo College).
- Bernardo Tengarrinha, 32, Portuguese footballer (Vitória de Setúbal, CSKA Sofia, Boavista), Hodgkin's lymphoma.

=== 31 ===
- Doğan Akhanlı, 64, Turkish-German writer, cancer.
- Fayek 'Adly 'Azb, 63, Egyptian Olympic boxer (1984). (death announced on this date)
- Joan Carlyle, 90, English operatic soprano.
- Chang Kuo-tung, 91–92, Taiwanese actor (Love Family) and film producer, pancreatic cancer.
- Jean-Marie Chevalier, 80, French economist.
- Fernando de Parias Merry, 84, Spanish politician, mayor of Seville (1975–1977) and member of Cortes Españolas (1975–1977).
- Frank Farrar, 92, American politician, attorney general (1963–1969) and governor (1969–1971) of South Dakota.
- Joan Ford, 95, British-born Canadian physician, assisted suicide.
- Cornelia Groves, 95, American preservationist, co-founder of the Savannah Country Day School.
- Prabhakar Jog, 89, Indian violinist.
- Sir Jim Lester, 89, British politician, MP (1974–1997).
- Dorothy Manley, 94, British sprint runner, Olympic silver medallist (1948).
- Alpo Martinez, 55, American drug dealer, shot.
- James Jemut Masing, 72, Malaysian politician, Sarawak Deputy Chief Minister (since 2016) and MLA (since 1983), complications from COVID-19.
- Miguel Mena, 34, Peruvian-born American jockey, traffic collision.
- Peter Philpott, 86, Australian cricketer (New South Wales, national team), complications from a fall.
- Pike Powers, 80, American attorney, complications from Parkinson's disease.
- Walter Reichert, 92, American politician, member of the Kentucky House of Representatives (1964–1966) and Senate (1966–1974).
- Luigi Reitani, 62, Italian germanist, translator and literary critic, COVID-19.
- Michel Robidoux, 78, Canadian musician.
- Graham Ross, 76–77, British theoretical physicist.
- Dean Shek, 72, Hong Kong actor (Drunken Master, A Better Tomorrow II, The Dragon from Russia), cancer.
- Ioannis Stathopoulos, 86–87, Greek politician, MP (1974–1993).
- Antonia Terzi, 50, Italian aerodynamicist, traffic collision.
- Dame Catherine Tizard, 90, New Zealand politician, mayor of Auckland (1983–1990) and governor-general (1990–1996).
- António Topa, 67, Portuguese engineer and politician, MP (since 2015).
- Włodzimierz Trams, 77, Polish Olympic basketball player (1968).
- Aurel Vainer, 89, Romanian politician, deputy (2004–2016).
- Mary Weddle, 87, American baseball player (Fort Wayne Daisies).
- Simon Young, Irish radio presenter (RTÉ 2fm).
- Avishag Zahavi, 99, Israeli botanist.
- Andrzej Zaorski, 78, Polish actor (The Mother of Kings, Westerplatte, Pięciu).
- Don Zewin, 69, American poker player, non-Hodgkin's lymphoma.
