= Wijnberg =

Wijnberg is a surname. Notable people with the surname include:

- Nachoem Wijnberg (born 1961), Dutch poet and author
- Paul Wijnberg (1934–2013), South African naval officer
- Piet Wijnberg (1957–2021), Dutch footballer
- Selma Engel-Wijnberg (1922–2018), Dutch Holocaust survivor
