= Richard Ohmann =

American literary critic (1931–2021)

Richard Malin Ohmann (July 11, 1931 – October 8, 2021) was an American literary critic.

Richard Malin Ohmann was born on July 11, 1931, in Shaker Heights, Ohio. He received a bachelor's degree in literature from Oberlin College in 1952 and a master's and doctorate from Harvard University in 1954 and 1960, respectively.

He began teaching at Wesleyan University in 1961, where he was the associate provost from 1966 to 1969. He was a full professor of English from 1966 and was named the Benjamin Waite Professor of the English Language at some point. Ohmann held a Guggenheim Fellowship in 1964–65.

Ohmann was a Marxist. At Wesleyan, he taught a course called "Economics of Fiction". In the late 1970s he designed and oversaw a Wesleyan course called "Towards a Socialist America."

Ohmann died on October 8, 2021, in Hawley, Massachusetts.

== Books ==
- Shaw: The Style and the Man. Wesleyan University Press. 1962. OCLC 362085.
- English in America: A Radical View of the Profession. Oxford University Press. 1976. OCLC 1978095. (one chapter by Wallace W. Douglas)
- Politics of Letters. Wesleyan University Press. 1987. ISBN 978-0-8195-5175-7. OCLC 15198215.
- Selling Culture: Magazines, Markets, and Class at the Turn of the Century. Verso Books. 1996. ISBN 978-1-85984-974-3. OCLC 33403761.
