= Enzo Collotti =

Italian historian (1929–2021)

Enzo Collotti (15 August 1929 – 7 October 2021) was an Italian historian and academic. He taught contemporary history at the University of Florence, the University of Bologna, and the University of Trieste. He is considered an important historian of the Italian resistance and in the study of Nazism. He was married to his colleague Enrica Pischel.
