= Bazyl Jaqypov =

Kazakh politician (1965–2021)

Bazyl Jakupov

Akim of Kostanay
- In office 23 September 2015 – 1 February 2019
- President: Nursultan Nazarbayev
- Preceded by: Akhmedbek Akhmachanov
- Succeeded by: Qairat Akhmetov

Personal details
- Born: 5 January 1965 Tersakan, Zhaksy District, Kazakh SSR, Soviet Union
- Died: 5 October 2021 (aged 56)
- Party: NO

Bazyl Jakupov (Kazakh: Базыл Шамұқанұлы Жақыпов, Bazyl Şamūqanūly Jaqypov; 4 January 1965 – 5 October 2021) was a Kazakh politician and agronomist. Educated at Kazakh Agro Technical University, he became a member of the Nur Otan party in 2004 and served as Akim of Kostanay from 2015 to 2019.
