= Maurice J. Goyette =

American politician

Member of the New Hampshire House of Representatives from the Belknap 6th district
- In office 1974–1978
- Preceded by: David Huot

Personal details
- Born: August 16, 1934 Laconia, New Hampshire, U.S.
- Died: October 9, 2021 (aged 87) Daytona Beach, Florida, U.S.
- Party: Democratic

Maurice J. Goyette (August 16, 1934 – October 9, 2021) was an American politician. He served as a Democratic member for the Belknap 6th district of the New Hampshire House of Representatives.

== Life and career ==
Goyette was born in Laconia, New Hampshire.

In 1974, Goyette defeated Donald H. Laliberte in the general election for the Belknap 6th district of the New Hampshire House of Representatives, winning 98 percent of the votes.

Goyette died on October 9, 2021, in Daytona Beach, Florida, at the age of 87.
