= Isaías Pérez Saldaña =

Spanish politician (1949–2021)

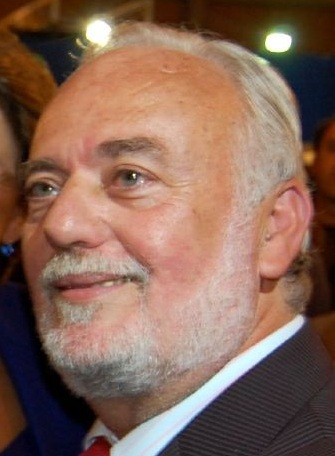
- Pérez in 2007

Minister of Agriculture, Livestock, Fisheries and Sustainable Development of Andalusia
- In office 25 April 2004 – 21 April 2008
- President: Manuel Chaves
- Preceded by: Paulino Plata
- Succeeded by: Martín Soler Márquez

Minister of Equality, Social Policies and Conciliation of Andalusia
- In office 2 August 1996 – 25 April 2004
- President: Manuel Chaves
- Preceded by: Ramón Marrero Gómez
- Succeeded by: Micaela Navarro

Member of the Parliament of Andalusia
- In office 1990–2008

Mayor of Ayamonte
- In office 1991–1996

Personal details
- Born: 28 June 1949 Ayamonte, Spain
- Died: 27 October 2021 (aged 72) Seville, Spain
- Party: PSOE

Isaías Pérez Saldaña (28 June 1949 – 27 October 2021) was a Spanish politician. A member of the Spanish Socialist Workers' Party, he served in the Parliament of Andalusia from 1990 to 2008 and was mayor of Ayamonte from 1991 to 1996.
