= Mario Andrea Rigoni =

Italian writer (1948–2021)

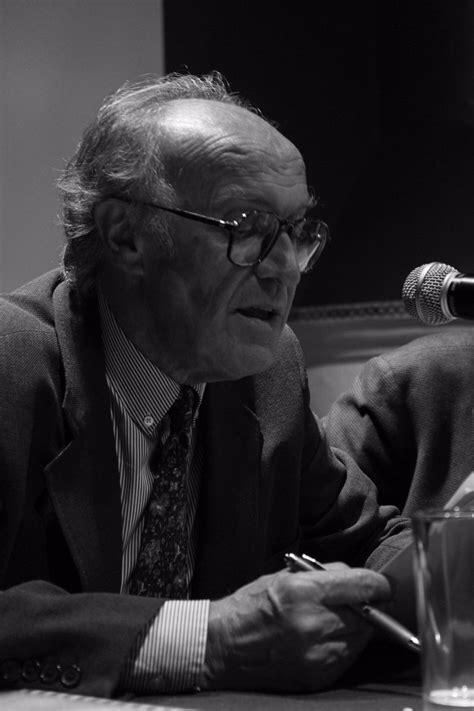
- Rigoni in 2021
- Born: 2 June 1948; Asiago, Italy
- Died: 15 October 2021 (aged 73); Montebelluna, Italy
- Occupation: Writer

Mario Andrea Rigoni (2 June 1948 – 15 October 2021) was an Italian writer. He worked as a professor of Italian literature at the University of Padua and was an editor of the works of Giacomo Leopardi and translated works by Emil Cioran.

== Works ==
=== Essays ===
- Saggi sul pensiero leopardiano (1982)
- Chi siamo: letteratura e identità ital (2004)
- Cioran dans mes souvenirs (2009)
- In compagnia di Cioran (2011)
- Ricordando Cioran (2012)
- Marilyn Monroe (2012)
- Il materialismo romantico di Leopardi (2013)

=== Editions ===
- Variazioni sull’Impossibile (1993)
- Elogio dell’America (2003)
- Dall’altra parte. Racconti (2009)
- Vanità (2010)
- Elogio della sigaretta (2010)
- Estraneità (2014)
