= Frank Zabriskie =

American-born Scottish astronomer (1933–2021)

Franklin Robert Zabriskie
- Born: 21 December 1933; Alexandria, Pennsylvania, U.S.
- Died: 14 October 2021 (aged 87); Kirkwall, Scotland
- Scientific career
- Fields: Astronomy

Frank Zabriskie (21 December 1933 – 14 October 2021) was an American-born Scottish astronomer and an Elected Fellow of the American Association for the Advancement of Science, elected in 1962.

Zabriskie was born in Alexandria, Pennsylvania on 21 December 1933. He died in Kirkwall, Scotland on 14 October 2021, aged 87.
