= Kit Berry =

English author (died 2021)

- Died: 29 October 2021
- Occupation: Author
- Writing career
- Genres: Fantasy, Urban fantasy
- Website: www.stonewylde.com

Kirsten Espensen (died 29 October, 2021), known by her pen name Kit Berry, was an English author. She was known as the author of the Stonewylde series, a fantasy series set in the fictional community of Stonewylde, which attracted an online cult following.

== Biography ==
Espensen lived in Weymouth in Dorset for many years, where she studied for her first degree in English and Media Studies at the then Dorset Institute of Higher Education. She then trained to be a teacher, and taught at local schools.

She became a full-time author and initially published the Stonewylde series under her own self-created publishing label Moongazy Publishing, before signing with Orion Publishing, citing online social networking as one of the reasons behind the series' success.

== Bibliography ==
- Magus of Stonewylde
- Moondance of Stonewylde
- Solstice at Stonewylde
- Shadows at Stonewylde
- Shaman of Stonewylde
