= George Olesen (weightlifter) =

Danish weightlifter (1960–2021)

George Oelesen (1960 – 23 October 2021) was a Danish weightlifter whose nickname was "The World's Strongest Man". He set numerous marks recognized in the Guinness Book of World Records. He posted as many as 199 of them including the heaviest boat pulled a mark he set in Sweden in 2000. He toured the U.S. doing shows and appeared on The Tonight Show with Jay Leno.

From 2009 on he was a disability pensioner. Olesen died on 23 October 2021 at the age of 60.
