= Kenneth Wilkinson (priest) =

Irish Anglican priest (1931–2021)

Kenneth Samuel Wilkinson (1931 – 17 October 2021) was an Irish Anglican priest who was Archdeacon of Ferns from 1998 until 2008.

Wilkinson was educated at Trinity College, Dublin and ordained in 1961. He was a curate at St. Michan, Dublin then the Incumbent at Killegney from 1967 to 1970. After that he was at Enniscorthy until 2002. Wilkinson died on 17 October 2021, at the age of 90.
