= Daniel Leone =

Italian footballer (1993–2021)

Personal information
- Date of birth: 3 June 1993
- Date of death: 3 October 2021 (aged 28)
- Position: Goalkeeper

Senior career*
Years	Team	Apps	(Gls)
2011–2015	Reggina	0	(0)
2012–2013	→ Pontedera (loan)	32	(0)
2013–2014	→ Reggiana (loan)	2	(0)
2014	→ Torres (loan)	19	(0)
2015–2016	Latina	0	(0)
2016–2017	Catanzaro	3	(0)
Total		56	(0)
- * Club domestic league appearances and goals

Daniel Leone (3 June 1993 – 3 October 2021) was an Italian professional footballer who played as a goalkeeper.

== Career ==
Leone played for Reggina, Pontedera, Reggiana, Torres, Latina and Catanzaro. Two of the clubs were in Serie B, but he never played higher than Serie C. He retired in 2017 after being diagnosed with a tumour in 2014. He died in October 2021 aged 28.
