= Fotini Dekazou Stefanopoulou =

Greek politician and academic (died 2021)

Member of the Hellenic Parliament
- In office 1993–1996

Personal details
- Died: 7 October 2021
- Party: Political Spring

Fotini Dekazou Stefanopoulou (Greek: Φωτεινή Δεκάζου Στεφανοπούλου; died 7 October 2021) was a Greek academic and politician. A member of the Political Spring party, she served in the Hellenic Parliament from 1993 to 1996.
