= Eudora Quartey-Koranteng =

Ghanaian diplomat (died 2021)

Eudora Quartey-Koranteng (died 20 October 2021) was the Ambassador Extraordinaire of the Republic of Ghana to Italy. She took over from Paulina Patience Abayage. She presented her credentials to the President of the Republic of Italy on 11 June 2019. She had concurrent accreditation to Slovenia, Serbia, Montenegro, and the Food and Agriculture Organization.

She died on 20 October 2021.

== Career ==
Eudora Quartey-Koranteng was appointed by President Akufo-Addo on 11 June 2019 to be Ghana's Ambassador to Italy.

During her term of office, she instituted the Embassy's Biometric Passport Printing System. She made a mark through the successful implementation of the biometric passport printing system.
