= Peter Dickson (historian) =

British historian (1929–2021)

Peter George Muir Dickson, FBA, FRHistS (26 April 1929 – 16 October 2021) was a British historian. He was Professor of Early Modern History at the University of Oxford between 1989 and 1996, and a fellow of St Catherine's College, Oxford, from 1960 until his death.

Born in 1929, Dickson was educated at Worcester College, Oxford, where he completed his undergraduate and doctoral studies. He was elected to a two-year research fellowship at Nuffield College, Oxford, in 1954 and was then a tutor at St Catherine's Society, Oxford, from 1956 until 1960, when the society was formed into St Catherine's College, Oxford, and he was elected one its first fellows. He served as the college's Vice-Master from 1975 to 1977. In 1978, he was appointed Reader in Modern History at the University of Oxford and in 1989 he was promoted to Professor of Early Modern History, a chair he held until 1996. He was a Fellow of the Royal Historical Society, and in 1988 was elected a Fellow of the British Academy, the United Kingdom's national academy for the humanities.

He died on 16 October 2021 at the age of 92.

== Publications ==
- The Sun Insurance Office 1710–1960: The History of Two and a Half Centuries of British Insurance (Oxford University Press, 1960).
- The Financial Revolution in England: A Study in the Development of Public Credit, 1688–1756 (Macmillan, 1967).
- Finance and Government under Maria Theresia, 1740–1780, 2 vols. (Clarendon Press, 1987).
