= Hertz Nazaire =

Artist and sickle cell advocate

Hertz Nazaire (October 2, 1973 - October 21, 2021) was a Haitian-American visual artist, writer, and advocate known for his mixed-media work exploring the lived experience of sickle cell disease, Black identity, and social justice. As a person living with sickle cell disease, Nazaire became a prominent voice in health equity and patient advocacy through his artistic and public engagement work. His "Sickle Cell Series" has been featured in medical publications and used worldwide in education efforts related to advancing the care of people living with sickle cell disease. He died of sickle cell disease complications at age 48 on October 21, 2021.

Early Life and Education

Hertz Nazaire was born in Port-au-Prince, Haiti, in 1973 to Yvesrose Nazaire. He and his mother immigrated to the United States at eight years of age, living first in New York and then in Bridgeport, Connecticut. Diagnosed with sickle cell anemia (HbSS) at a young age, Nazaire's experience with chronic pain and frequent hospitalizations shaped much of his artistic and personal outlook. He preferred to be called "Naz" as "Hertz" sounded too much like "hurts" and was used by classmates to tease him in his youth.

He was orphaned at age 13 when his mother died in a car crash. He lived with his godmother until the age of 18 when he became homeless for eight months. He was encouraged by his teachers at Westhill High School in Stamford, Connecticut to explore his interest in art. He went on to the Art Institute of Fort Lauderdale and University of Bridgeport but did not complete his studies due to complications of his illness and for 18 months again struggled with homelessness before finding a rent-controlled artist space.

Personal Life

Nazaire never married, though was briefly engaged. He described the challenges that living with chronic illness and the associated difficulties in maintaining regular employment as a key limiting factor in starting a family of his own. He was also aware of the risk of having children with sickle cell disease should he partner with someone also living with sickle cell disease or sickle cell trait. Due to complications related to sickle cell disease, Nazaire spent extensive periods of his life admitted to hospital for care and required monthly apheresis treatments. Sickle cell disease significantly impaired his vision, leaving him blind in his right eye and with limited vision in his left, an issue that became more prominent in his later years. In his younger years he supported himself financially through a number of short term retail jobs. In later years he earned some money from his artwork through online sales and merchandising.

Artistic Work

Nazaire’s art spans a wide range of media, including acrylic painting, mixed media, digital art, and poetry. His work is characterized by bold use of color inspired by his birthplace of Haiti, emotional intensity, and themes of pain, resilience, race, and identity. He described his path to painting as an inevitable response to a lifetime of living with pain. "Even when my work has nothing to do with sickle cell, pain is always in my paintings". In an article he authored for The Lancet Haematology, he wrote, "I became a painter not because I was gifted or talented, but because those colours and shapes provided me with an escape from suffering and dwelling in the pain." He identified as a "Sickle Cell Warrior" in a constant battle with the symptoms of his disease. Despite the challenges of living with sickle cell disease, Nazaire emphasized the importance of positivity in his life and work

Nazaire published an adult coloring book entitled, "Finding Your Colors" in 2017.

His "Sickle Cell Series" has been used in education materials internationally including on the cover of the McGraw-Hill textbook, "Sickle Cell Disease".

His "Waiting Room Project" installation, completed in 2021, features three chairs decorated with images from his "Sickle Cell Series", representing the long waits that people living with sicke cell disease often face in emergency departments.

Nazaire created a character called "Mr. Nobody Cares", represented by a cardboard box mask decorated in black marker that he would at times place over his head as part of his artistic process. He would at times wear the mask in public settings including on public transportation or while attending art events, exploring the experience of simultaneously being both visible and invisible.

Advocacy and Public Engagement

In addition to his art, Nazaire was an outspoken advocate for people living with invisible illnesses, especially sickle cell disease. He used his platform to raise awareness, combat stigma, and advocate for better access to care.

Nazaire was integral in campaigns for sickle cell awareness and contributed to educational materials for patients. He spoke about depression, disability, and the impact of anti-Black racism in health.

Recognition

Nazaire's work has been featured in art exhibitions and medical education initiatives. He was widely respected in the sickle cell community for his ability to use his own experiences to advocate for systemic change.

In 2016 he was recognized as a Rare Artist by the EveryLife Foundation for Rare Diseases for his painting, "Ten Redefined", part of his "Sickle Cell Series". He was a semi-finalist for the Holman Prize for Blind Ambition for "Waiting Room Project".

His puzzle art mural, entitled, "The World Is a Little Brighter With Pain", is displayed at Global Therapeutics (since acquired by Pfizer), a pharmaceutical company in San Francisco and maker of novel sickle cell therapeutics.

Death

Nazaire died on October 21, 2021 in Bridgeport, Connecticut, of complications from sickle cell disease.

Legacy and Influence

Nazaire's work was featured in a four-installment traveling exhibit, the "Nod to 'Naz' Exhibit: A Tribute to Hertz Nazaire" in 2023- 2024 by the Sickle Cell Disease Association of America. It has also been featured in an augmented reality exhibit entitled, "Mr. Nobody Cares AR Exhibit" by 3 Apples High.

Nazaire’s work continues to inspire other artists and activists living with chronic illness to use their work as a medium for education and advocacy.
