= Lisa Brodyaga =

American human rights lawyer (1940–2021)

Elisabeth S. Brodyaga (September 21, 1940 – October 28, 2021) was an American human rights lawyer. She ran Proyecto Libertad, a pro bono legal initiative for Central American asylum seekers. In 1986, she founded a refugee camp, Refugio del Rio Grande, in the Rio Grande Valley which she ran until her death.

Since 1981, she was certified by the Texas Board of Legal Specialization. At about that time, she became deeply involved with the work on behalf of the Central Americans. Refugio Del Rio Grande, Inc., is a non-profit, 501(c)(3) "refugee camp" on a 45 acre wilderness near San Benito, Texas, where she served as a volunteer attorney.

Most of her later work was on behalf of lawful permanent residents, caught up in the web of the 1996 amendments. Between 1996 and 2001, she litigated the issue of the retroactivity of the repeal of Section 212(c) relief, and represented approximately 50 or 60 LPRs under administratively final orders of deportation. She won thirty-plus habeas cases, with more held in abeyance while INS appealed her victory, and managed to hold INS at bay until St. Cyr was decided, at which point INS withdrew its appeals.

She has been devoted to challenging the Fifth Circuit’s conclusion that state drug convictions treated as felonies by the state are aggravated felonies. This issue was also won at the Supreme Court, in Lopez v. Gonzales, 127 S.Ct. 625 (2006), holding that drug offenses which would be misdemeanors under federal law are not aggravated felonies, regardless of how they are characterized by the state.

Prior cases she has been involved in include Guevara-Flores, an antecedent to Cardoza-Fonseca, and Diaz-Resendez, giving a broad interpretation to the scope of review of discretionary decisions, (preIIRIRA), but still useful in some instances. She has received various national awards, from the National Lawyers Guild, American Immigration Lawyers Association, and Lexis-Nexis. Early in her career, she taught at various law schools.

Ms. Brodyaga graduated in 1974 from Catholic University School of Law, in Washington, D.C. To keep her sanity, she raised animals, including horses, dogs, and a few head of cattle. To atone for all the paper she wasted on briefs and the like, she planted trees.
