= Louise Bäckman =

Swedish-Sámi researcher (1926–2021)

- Born: 15 November 1926
- Died: 4 October 2021 (aged 94)
- Other name: Nanny Götha Lovise Bäckman
- Education: Stockholm University
- Occupation: Religious researcher
- Organization: Stockholm Sami Association

Nanny Götha Lovise Bäckman (15 November 1926 – 4 October 2021), known professionally as Louise Bäckman. was a Swedish-Sámi religious researcher.

== Biography ==
Louise Bäckman grew up in the Sámi village of Vapsten and went to Sámi residential and nomadic schools for five years. Throughout her childhood and college years, she experienced anti-Sámi prejudice, as Sámi were not allowed to live in houses, and she and her classmates were punished for speaking their mother tongue.

Bäckman received her doctorate at Stockholm University in 1975 with a thesis in the history of religion on Sámi protective spirits (sáiva). Bäckman was appointed professor of religious history at Stockholm University in 1986. She was a member of the Nathan Söderblom Society and one of the founding members of the Stockholm Sami Association in 1947.

In her research, Bäckman highlighted the Sámi and, among other things, wrote about noaidis, or Sámi shamans, the bear in Sámi tradition, and the Sámi and settlers. She received an honorary doctorate in 2003 at Umeå University. In 2010, Bäckman received the year's development award from the Sámi Women's Forum.

== Selected bibliography ==
- Louise Bäckman: Study in the pre-Christian Sámi's conceptions of the underworld with emphasis on the Scandinavian Sámi, Stockholm University, Department of the History of Religions 1964
- Louise Bäckman: Sájva: notions of help and protection in sacred mountains among the Sámi, Stockholm Studies in Comparative Religion no. 13, thesis at Stockholm University 1975
- Louise Bäckman and Åke Hultcrantz: Studies in Lapp shamanism, Stockholm Studies in Comparative Religion no. 16, Stockholm University 1978
- Louise Bäckman and Rolf Kjellström (eds.): Kristoffer Sjulsson's memories: About the Vapstenlapparna in the early 1800s, Nordic Museum 1979 in the series Acta Laponica, no. 20, ISBN 917-108-129-1
