= Maurice Malleret =

French writer and historian (1931–2021)

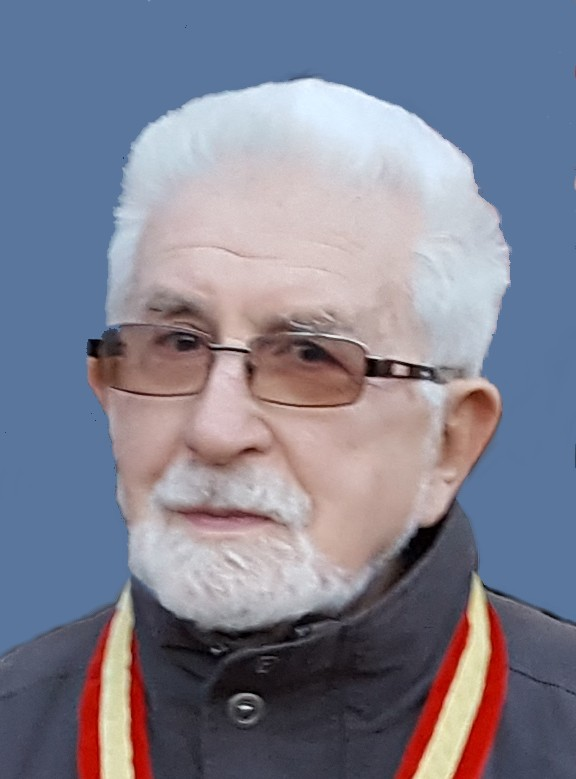
- Malleret in 2016
- Born: 30 September 1931; Cosne-d'Allier, France
- Died: 3 October 2021 (aged 90); Lavault-Sainte-Anne, France
- Occupations: Writer; Historian

Maurice Malleret (30 September 1931 – 3 October 2021) was a French writer, historian, musicologist, and poet. He collaborated with the magazine La Vie du rail and Cercle Littéraire des Écrivains Cheminots. He was a member of the Société des poètes et artistes de France, Secretary of Les Amis de Montluçon, and served on the editing committee of Les Cahiers bourbonnais.

== Biography ==
After his secondary studies in Montluçon, Malleret started his career with SNCF. He worked at the station in Treignat from 1948 to 1963 and subsequently conducted research for a logging company in Montluçon and Limoges from 1964 to 1969. He became a correspondent for the weekly newspaper La Vie du rail.

In 1956, Malleret became a member of the friends of the National Museum of Natural History, France and contributed to an exhibit for the Cité du Train in Mulhouse. He edited the monthly newsletter of Les Amis de Montluçon from 1995 to 2011. He served on the editorial board of Les Cahiers bourbonnais from 2004 to 2013.

Maurice Malleret died in Lavault-Sainte-Anne on 3 October 2021 at the age of 90.

== Distinctions ==
- Silver Medal of the Union Artistique et Intellectuelle des Cheminots Français (1995)
- Prix Athanor of the City of Montluçon (1995)
- Knight of the Ordre des Palmes académiques (2007)
- Knight of the Order of Agricultural Merit (2010)

== Publications ==
- Semailles (poésies) (1978)
- Le Musée de la traverse en bois (1983)
- Historique de l'ancienne subdivision des bois des installations fixes (1986)
- La Vigne à Lavault-Sainte-Anne, jadis et naguère (1988)
- La Descente du Cher en chemin de fer, de Mérinchal (Creuse) à Vierzon (Cher) (1988)
- Pour voir Montluçon d'une autre façon (1989)
- Trains de rêve et rêves de train (1991)
- Jean Dormoy, le forgeron du 1er mai (1994)
- Montluçon, capitale du Haut Cher (1994)
- Encyclopédie des auteurs du pays montluçonnais et de leurs œuvres (1440-1994) (1995)
- Le patrimoine des communes de l'Allier (1999)
- Pour découvrir Montluçon de la meilleure façon (2005)
- Le vignoble du Theil (2016)
