= Ottó Prouza =

Hungarian volleyball player (1933–2021)

Personal information
- Nationality: Hungarian
- Born: 13 June 1933; Salgótarján, Hungary
- Died: 15 October 2021 (aged 88); Budapest

Sport
- Sport: Volleyball

Ottó Prouza (13 June 1933 – 15 October 2021) was a Hungarian volleyball player. He competed in the men's tournament at the 1964 Summer Olympics.
