= Inder Bir Singh Passi =

Indian mathematician (1939–2021)

- Born: 20 August 1939
- Died: 2 October 2021 (aged 82)
- Awards: Shanti Swarup Bhatnagar Prize for Science and Technology
- Scientific career
- Fields: Algebra
- Workplaces: Kurukshetra University, Panjab University, Chandigarh, Indian Institute of Science Education and Research, Mohali, Ashoka University, Sonipat

Inder Bir Singh Passi (20 August 1939 – 2 October 2021) was an Indian mathematician who specialised in algebra.

IBS Passi was the former dean of university instructions (DUI) and professor emeritus of the department of mathematics at Panjab University. He was awarded in 1983 the Shanti Swarup Bhatnagar Prize for Science and Technology, the highest science award in India, in the mathematical sciences category. Passi was a noted group-theorist in India, had made significant contribution to certain aspects of theory of groups specially to the study of group rings. His results on the dimension subgroups, augmentation powers in group rings, and related problems have received wide recognition. His 1979 monograph summarizing the state of the subject is a basic reference source.
