= Když rozvod, tak rozvod =

Když rozvod, tak rozvod is a Czech comedy film. It was released in 1982.
