= Sidney Walton =

American soldier (1919–2021)

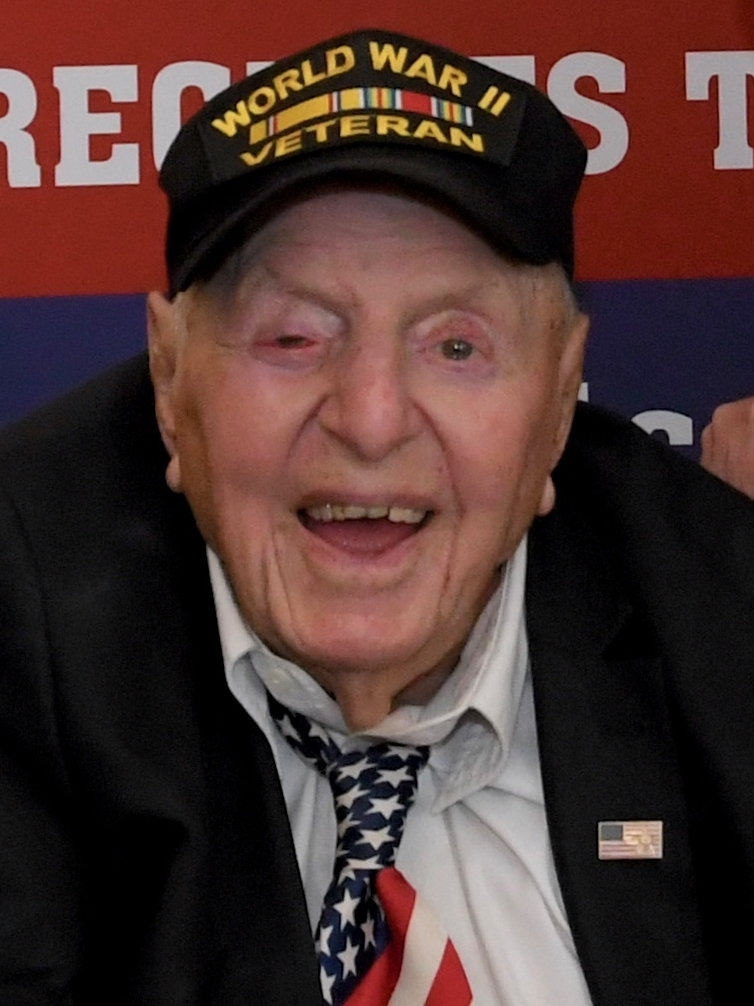
- Born: February 11, 1919; Lower East Side, Manhattan, New York City, United States
- Died: October 2, 2021 (aged 102) San Diego, California, United States
- Allegiance: United States
- Branch: United States Army
- Service years: 1941–1946
- Rank: Corporal
- Conflicts: World War II

Sidney Walton (February 11, 1919 – October 2, 2021) was a United States Army World War II veteran.

== Biography ==
Born on the Lower East Side of Manhattan, New York, on February 11, 1919, Walton spent his early life there, joining the Army in March 1941. He served during World War II, being discharged in 1946 at the rank of corporal.

After the war, he taught geology at Duke University and pursued graduate studies at Yale University. He married school teacher Rena Bell in 1954. He later had a civilian job at the United States Air Force base in Maine, and one at the NAS North Island in San Diego after having moved there in 1960.

He lived in Clairemont, San Diego, until the death of his wife in 1982, and by the late 1980s had moved to Rancho Bernardo.

In April 2018, he set out on a "No Regrets" tour with the goal of meeting the President of the United States and the Governors of all 50 states. By July 2019, he had met 23 governors and President Donald Trump.

On February 2, 2020, Walton was one of four surviving World War II veterans who participated in the coin flip for Super Bowl LIV, as the game was dedicated to them. San Francisco 49ers captain Joe Staley called the coin flip on behalf of his fellow co-captains and the captains of the Kansas City Chiefs.

He died on October 2, 2021, at the age of 102.
