= Trevor Heath =

Australian rules footballer (1952–2021)

Personal information
- Full name: Trevor James Heath
- Born: 2 March 1952
- Died: 20 October 2021 (aged 69)
- Original team: Essendon Baptists-St John's
- Height: 175 cm (5 ft 9 in)
- Weight: 74 kg (163 lb)
- Position: Half-forward

Playing career^{1}
Years	Club	Games (Goals)
1971	Essendon	1 (0)
1974–75	West Perth	25 (30)
1976–78	Subiaco	17 (17)
- ^{1} Playing statistics correct to the end of 1978.

Trevor James Heath (2 March 1952 – 20 October 2021) was an Australian rules footballer who played with Essendon in the Victorian Football League (VFL).

In 1970, Heath came runner-up in the Morrish Medal, awarded to the best and fairest player in the VFL under-19s competition. He played his only senior VFL match the next year, 147-point loss to Collingwood. Heath later played for Eastlake in the ACT, West Perth, Subiaco in the West Australian Football League (WAFL), and Wanneroo in the Western Australian Amateur Football League.
