= Pat Campbell (broadcaster) =

American talk radio host (1960–2021)

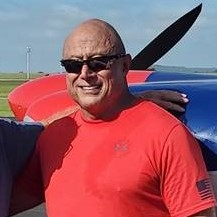
- Campbell in 2020
- Born: March 17, 1960; Buffalo, New York, US
- Died: October 20, 2021 (aged 61); Tulsa, Oklahoma, US
- Occupation: Talk radio host
- Years active: 1993–2021
- Website: 1170 KFAQ

Patrick J. Campbell (March 17, 1960 – October 20, 2021) was an American talk radio host in the Tulsa, Oklahoma, area on station KFAQ (1170 AM). He was the host of The Pat Campbell Show, which aired weekdays from 6 a.m. to 9 a.m., central standard time. He was a guest on Fox News Channel's The O'Reilly Factor, Fox and Friends, and Purity Products' weekend informercials, heard on stations all across the US.

Campbell received a Bachelor of Arts degree from Mercyhurst College. Formerly a math teacher, Campbell began his career in radio as a talk show caller. In an interview, he said that he began listening to Rush Limbaugh during the 1991 Gulf War, but remained to listen to the local host who followed, who espoused a liberal point of view. When no one called in to challenge the host, Campbell said he called in to debate him. A couple of competing radio station managers, impressed with Campbell's ability to debate the host extemporaneously, offered him a try-out as a result.

From June 2004 to April 2008, Campbell was host of The Pat Campbell Show at WFLA 540 AM in Orlando, Florida. One of Campbell's interviews made the national spotlight when, in 2005, he interviewed Rep. Tom Tancredo, who suggested that Mecca should be bombed if the U.S. was attacked with nuclear weapons. Campbell was also a regular Friday guest of Tucker Carlson while the host was on MSNBC; he was also a frequent guest of television host Rita Cosby.

In 2006, 2007, 2009, 2010 and 2011 he was named one of Talkers Magazine's 250 most influential talk show hosts.

Campbell began hosting with KFAQ in April 2008 under a three-year contract. He interviewed a multitude of guests, often with an emphasis toward issues pertaining to Oklahoma, but also with attention to national and international news and cultural issues. He was also a speaker with the Oklahoma Speaker's Bureau, speaking on topics dealing with conservative issues and world affairs, among others. He also was named one of Oklahoma's best radio personalities by Oklahoma magazine.

Campbell died from brain cancer on October 20, 2021, at the age of 61.
