= Reg Beresford =

English footballer (1921–2021)

Personal information
- Full name: Reginald Harold Beresford
- Date of birth: 3 June 1921
- Place of birth: Walsall, England
- Date of death: 14 October 2021 (aged 100)
- Positions: Forward; wing half

Youth career
- 1938–: Aston Villa

Senior career*
Years	Team	Apps	(Gls)
–1948	Birmingham City		
1948–1949	Crystal Palace	7	(1)
- * Club domestic league appearances and goals

Reginald Harold Beresford (3 June 1921 – 14 October 2021) was an English professional footballer who appeared in the Football League for Crystal Palace as a forward or wing half.

== Career ==
Beresford began his youth career at Aston Villa in 1938 and in 1946, signed for Birmingham City. He did not make an appearance for Birmingham and in August 1948, signed for Crystal Palace then playing in the Third Division South. He made his debut in the opening match of the season in a 1–5 defeat away to Reading and went on to make seven appearances in the first half of the season, scoring once in a 3–1 home win over Watford in September. In May 1949 Beresford left Crystal Palace having made seven appearances scoring once.

== Death ==
Beresford died on 14 October 2021, at the age of 100.
