= Masten Wanjala =

Kenyan suspected serial killer

- Born: 2001; Bungoma, Kenya
- Status: Deceased
- Died: 15 October 2021 (aged 20); Bungoma, Kenya
- Cause of death: Lynching

Details
- Victims: 10
- Span of crimes: 2015–2021
- Country: Kenya
- State: Nairobi

Masten Milimu Wanjala (2001 – 15 October 2021) was a Kenyan suspected serial killer. He was accused of killing 10 boys in Nairobi.

Wanjala admitted to drugging and murdering more than 10 boys since 2019, and to drinking the blood of some. He gained their confidence by pretending to be a football coach, and held some for ransom. The bodies of at least four victims were recovered after Wanjala led police to the locations where he disposed of them. Of these victims, two had been strangled, a third died of head injuries, and the fourth child's cause of death could not be established.

He was arrested on 14 July 2021, and was held at Jogoo Road police station, but had yet to be charged when he escaped from custody on 13 October. The three police officers on duty at the time were arraigned on charges of allowing and assisting his escape; they said there was a power cut at the police station that night. Two days after his escape, Wanjala was lynched by an angry mob in Mukhweya, Bungoma County, where his parents live; his parents have since disowned him.
