= Frieda Stahl =

American physicist

Frieda Axelrod Stahl (May 27, 1922 – October 1, 2021) was an American historian of physics and physics educator known for her work on the language of physics and for her advocacy of women in science. She was a professor emerita at California State University, Los Angeles.

== Life ==
Stahl was born on May 27, 1922. After earning a master's degree from Hofstra University in 1957, with the thesis Exciton states in semiconductors, she became a faculty member at California State University, Los Angeles in 1958, the first woman physicist at the university. She completed a doctorate at the Claremont Graduate School with the 1969 dissertation Teaching Physics for Scientific Literacy.

She served as associate dean of academic planning for undergraduate studies for over five years, from 1970 to 1975, before returning to physics teaching and research. After retiring as professor emerita in 1992, she remained active in research, and in 2002–2003 chaired the Committee on History and Philosophy of Physics of the American Association of Physics Teachers. She died on October 1, 2021.

== Recognition ==
Stahl was a 1999 honoree in the California State University, Los Angeles Distinguished Women Awards.

She was named a Fellow of the American Physical Society (APS) in 2003, after a nomination from the APS Forum on the History and Philosophy of Physics, "for extensive work with UCLA's archive and Web site concerning women in physics, energetic efforts to integrate history of physics into physics education, and investigations into the relationship between physics and language".

She was also a Fellow of the American Association of Physics Teachers, which in 2006 awarded her its Homer L. Dodge Citation for Distinguished Service.

== Selected publications ==
- Stahl, Frieda A. (January 1987), "Physics as metaphor and vice versa", Leonardo, 20 (1): 57–64, doi:10.2307/1578212, JSTOR 1578212, S2CID 61945749
- Stahl, Frieda A. (November 1991), "Research and teaching: partnership, not paradox", College Teaching, 39 (3): 97–99, doi:10.1080/87567555.1991.10532436, JSTOR 27558472
- Stahl, Frieda A. (March 1997), "Physics, language, and literature", The Physics Teacher, 35 (3): 143–145, Bibcode:1997PhTea..35..143S, doi:10.1119/1.2344622
