= Ioannis Stathopoulos =

Greek politician (1934–2021)

Member of the Hellenic Parliament
- In office 1974–1993
- Constituency: Constituency of Laconia

Deputy Minister for National Defense
- In office 1991–1993

Personal details
- Born: 1934 Athens, Greece
- Died: 31 October 2021 (aged 86–87)
- Party: ND

Ioannis Stathopoulos (Greek: Ιωάννης Σταθόπουλος; 1934 – 31 October 2021) was a Greek politician. A member of the New Democracy party, he served in the Hellenic Parliament from 1974 to 1993 and was Deputy Minister for National Defense from 1991 to 1993.
