= Jaroslav Dočkal =

Czech footballer (1939–2021)

Personal information
- Date of birth: 22 November 1939
- Date of death: 18 October 2021 (aged 81)
- Position: Forward

Senior career*
Years	Team	Apps	(Gls)
1960–1964	Sparta Prague	62	(15)
1964–1967	Teplice	82	(16)

Managerial career
- 1977–1978: Viktoria Plzeň
- 1982–1983: Sigma Olomouc
- 1985–1986: Mladá Boleslav
- 1990–1991: Hradec Králové
- 1998–1999: Jablonec
- * Club domestic league appearances and goals

Jaroslav Dočkal (22 November 1939 – 18 October 2021) was a Czech football player and manager.

== Career ==
Dočkal played for Sparta Prague and Teplice, and later managed Sigma Olomouc, Hradec Králové and Jablonec.
