= John Joiner =

Australian rules footballer (1934–2021)

Personal information
- Full name: John Francis Joiner
- Born: 19 June 1934
- Died: 6 October 2021 (aged 87)
- Original team: Lincoln Stars
- Height: 173 cm (5 ft 8 in)
- Weight: 67 kg (148 lb)

Playing career^{1}
Years	Club	Games (Goals)
1955–56	North Melbourne	11 (0)
- ^{1} Playing statistics correct to the end of 1956.

John Francis Joiner (19 June 1934 – 6 October 2021) was an Australian rules footballer who played with North Melbourne in the Victorian Football League (VFL).
