= James Baar =

American writer (1929–2021)

- Born: February 9, 1929; New York City, U.S.
- Died: October 3, 2021 (aged 92); Providence, Rhode Island, U.S.
- Education: Union College
- Occupations: Author; blogger; journalist
- Spouse: Beverly

James Baar (February 9, 1929 – October 3, 2021) was an American author, international corporate communications consultant, corporate communications software developer, blogger, former business executive, journalist and sometime college lecturer.

His latest books include "Conversations at the Redwood: The Portraits Speak" (historical fiction), "A King for America" (political satire) and "But Wait! There’s More! [maybe]," a book on the advertising agency business’ Golden Age and current chaos.

== Early life and career ==
Born in New York City, Baar graduated from Union College in 1949 where he majored in philosophy. Baar began his newspaper career on The Record in Troy, New York, where he "specialized in reporting obits, church notices and the occasional arson." He graduated to the United Press and subsequently was a reporter and editor in the UPI Washington Bureau and Senior Editor of Missiles & Rockets Magazine.

In his later business career, Baar has been Chief Operating Officer in four major public relations agencies: Hill & Knowlton Advanced Technology, Gray-Strayton, Creamer Dickson Basford and Lewis & Gilman. He also was Corporate Communications Officer of Computervision, managing director of General Electric's European Communications Operation and manager of various GE PR operations in the United States.

== Personal life ==
He and his wife, Beverly, lived in Providence, Rhode Island. Baar died on October 3, 2021, in Providence, Rhode Island.

== Published works ==
- Polaris! (with William E Howard), 1960, ISBN 978-0-15-172659-2
- Combat Missileman (with William E Howard), 1961, ASIN #B0007DWQD4
- Spacecraft & Missiles of the World 1962 (with William E. Howard), ASN #B0000EGOMB
- The Great Free Enterprise Gambit, 1980, ISBN 0-395-29115-1
- The Careful Voters Dictionary of Language Pollution (Understanding Willietalk and Other Spinspeak), 1999, ISBN 1-58500-078-7
- Spinspeak II: The Dictionary of Language Pollution, 2004, ISBN 1-4184-2742-X
- Ultimate Severance, 2005, ISBN 1-4208-3847-4
- But Wait! There's More (maybe) (with Donald E. Creamer), 2008, ISBN 978-1-4363-3092-3
- The Real Thing and Other Tales, 2011, ISBN 978-1-4505-5374-2
- A King for America (novella), 2013 ASIN-B00C7875C6
- Trump Card: Holding America's Enemies at Bay (with William E. Howard), ISBN 978-1482366631
- Conversations at the Redwood: The Portraits Speak, 2018, ISBN 978-1546580492
