= Eeileen Romero =

Salvadoran politician (1974–2021)

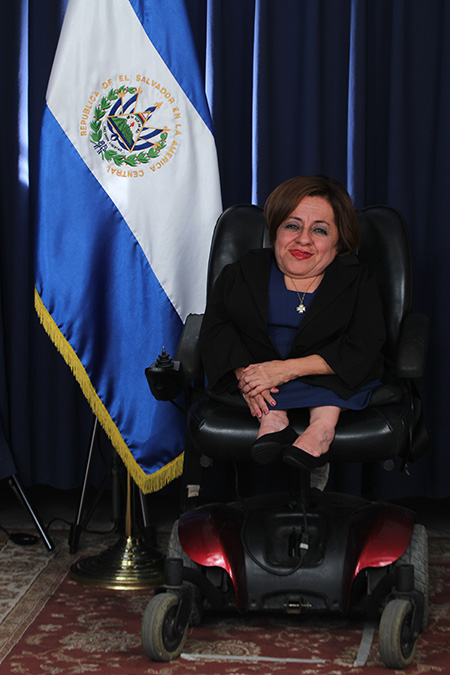
- Romero in 2018

Deputy of the Legislative Assembly of El Salvador from San Salvador
- In office 1 May 2018 – 1 May 2021

Personal details
- Born: Eeileen Auxiliadora Romero Valle; 3 February 1974 San Salvador, El Salvador
- Died: 25 October 2021 (aged 47) San Salvador, El Salvador
- Party: National Coalition Party
- Occupation: Attorney, politician, activist

Eeileen Auxiliadora Romero Valle (3 February 1974 – 25 October 2021) was a Salvadoran lawyer, politician and public servant. A member of the National Coalition Party, she served in the Legislative Assembly of El Salvador from 2018 to 2021.

== Early life ==
Eeileen Romero was born on 3 February 1974 in the San Salvador suburb of Mejicanos. Her father, Antonio Romero Diaz, was a merchant. Born with seven bone fractures, she lived with the effects of the brittle bone disease osteogenesis imperfecta throughout her life and used a wheelchair for mobility.

When she was eight years old, Romero's father died in the Salvadoran Civil War. Romero and her mother Sofia Santos Valle moved out of San Salvador to live near family in the small rural town of San Pablo Tacachico.

Due to El Salvador's lack of support for people with any type of physical disability, Romero did not begin her primary school studies until the age of 13. She persisted, completing her General Baccalaureate degree in 1998 at the Colegio Liceo Cristiano Reverendo Juan Bueno Central in San Salvador.

In 2004, she received her law degree from the Universidad Cristiana de las Asambleas de Dios (Christian University of the Assemblies of God) and became an attorney. The Supreme Court of Justice appointed her as a Lawyer of the Republic of El Salvador in 2008, a role she held until her death.

== Career ==
Eeileen Romero held many public service positions, particularly those representing persons with disabilities in national and international committees and delegations. Among her roles, she served as Legal Collaborator of the Inspection Department of the Ministry of Labor and Social Welfare of El Salvador, Delegate of the Individuals Department, and Immediate Head of the Office of User Labor Counseling.

In 2005, Romero represented El Salvador at the United Nations International Convention on the Rights of Persons with Disabilities in New York City.

Since 2011, she served as representative of the Ministry of Labor and Social Welfare of El Salvador in the Technical Committee of the National Council for Comprehensive Attention to Persons with Disabilities (CONAIPD).

Due to her success, she was often recognized in national and international media for her inspiring work. Coverage included the American network Univision, the evangelical Christian television show The 700 Club, and the British network ITV.

== Political life ==
At the end of 2017, Romero announced her candidacy for the national post of deputy for the legislative and municipal elections. In the elections, held 4 March 2018, she received 20,718 votes.

In this role, Romero carried out and led the election of magistrates, prosecutors and the receipt of a change of government. She carried out analysis, study and opinion of the matters submitted before legislative commissions; legislation and Constitutional issues; family, youth, the elderly and people with disabilities; Municipal Affairs; work; and Social Welfare. In addition, she monitored legal processes of Law Reform projects, opinions issued by the Legislative Commissions and other requests and proposals entering the Assembly.

== Health and death ==
Romero lived with physical disabilities caused by osteogenesis imperfecta, also called "crystal bones" or "brittle bone disease".

Romero died at age 47 from cardiac arrest.
