= Rama Khandwala =

India's oldest tour guide (1926–2021)

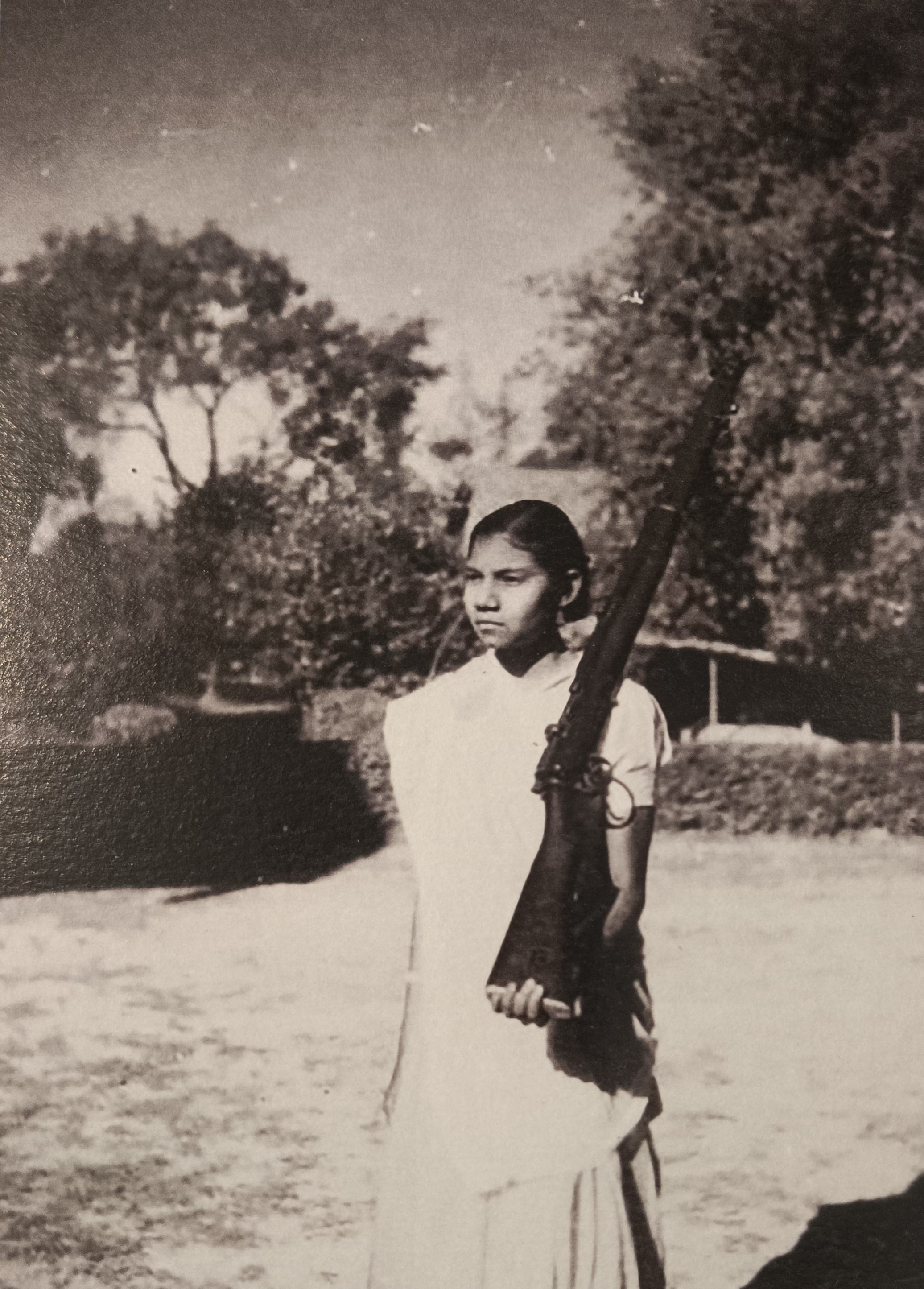
Image of Rama Mehta (1926–2021)

Rama Satyendra Khandwala (née Mehta, 3 December 1926 – 28 October 2021) was India's oldest tour guide and was the oldest living member of the Rani of Jhansi Regiment, formed by Subhas Chandra Bose during India's freedom movement.

== Early life ==
Khandwala was born on 3 December 1926 to an affluent family in Rangoon, Burma (now Yangon, Myanmar) as the fifth of seven siblings. Her grandfather was a doctor and a lawyer. Her mother, Lilavati Chhaganlal Mehta, was the recruiting officer at the Rani of Jhansi Regiment and a part of the Indian Independence League. At the age of 17, Khandwala and her sister Neelam joined the Regiment as sepoys after hearing Bose's speech in Rangoon. She attended a private school where the popular refrain was "Britain shall always rule the waves".

== Career ==
Joining as a Sepoy, Khandwala soon became the Second Lieutenant at the Regiment and led 30 Ranis for two years in Rangoon. Speaking about her experience with Conde Nast Traveller, she said:

My years in the INA were the most precious ones. The training was tough. I was promoted to be a Second Lieutenant and led 30 Ranis. That training still keeps me going. They aren’t going to make any freedom fighter-tour guides anymore, are they?

As a part of the Regiment, she was trained to be a soldier and a nurse. Military training included rifle and bayonet practice, handling machine guns and STEN guns, and defense and attack maneuvers. Medical training included working in general wards and operating rooms.

In 1944, she worked as a nurse in a hospital located in Maymyo (now, Pyin Oo Lwin) and almost died in an air raid. After World War II, she and her family were put under house-arrest for six months and later moved to Bombay (now, Mumbai) in 1946. In the initial year, she worked as a secretary in a trading firm, nurse, and a Japanese language translator but she was not very keen on desk jobs. Later, she spotted an advertisement for becoming trained tourist guides and decided to pursue it. She had learned Japanese during their occupation of Burma between 1942 and 1945. She worked as a translator for documentaries created by Japanese television channels, and corporates. During her stint as an interpreter for a Japanese documentary, she met the Dalai Lama and accompanied the King of Bhutan on a hike to Elephanta's Buddhist caves as a guide.

Khandwala served as a tour guide for over 50 years, remaining active into her later years, and was particularly popular with Japanese tourists visiting India. In 2019, she became a TEDx speaker.

== Personal life ==
Khandwala married in Bombay in 1949. Her husband died in 1982, and she had one daughter.

She died in Mumbai on 28 October 2021, at the age of 94.

== Recognition ==
In 2017, President Ram Nath Kovind felicitated Khandwala with the Best Tourist Guide Award at the National Tourism Awards. On India's 72nd Independence Day, Khandwala inaugurated and was the chief guest at the Indian Film Festival organised by the Films Division, Ministry of Information and Broadcasting.

A documentary film about her wartime experiences, entitled "Elephants do Remember," was released in 2019.
