= Achmad Rizal Zakaria =

Indonesian politician (1963–2021)

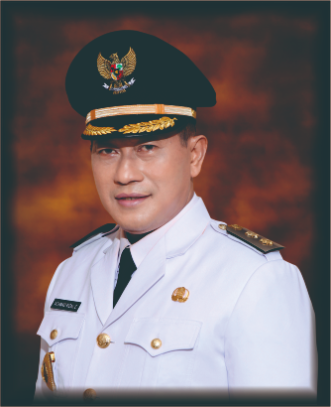
- Zakaria in 2018

Vice-Mayor of Mojokerto
- In office 10 December 2018 – 8 October 2021
- Preceded by: Suyitno

Personal details
- Born: 23 April 1963 Mojokerto, Indonesia
- Died: 8 October 2021 (aged 58) Surabaya, Indonesia
- Party: Gerindra

Achmad Rizal Zakaria (23 April 1963 – 8 October 2021) was an Indonesian politician. A member of the Great Indonesia Movement Party, he served as Vice-Mayor of Mojokerto from 2018 to 2021. He became ill on 8 October 2021 during an official activity and subsequently died.
