= Cyrille Tahay =

Belgian politician (1938–2021)

Member of the Parliament of Wallonia
- In office 1995–1999

Mayor of Comblain-au-Pont
- In office 1989–2004

Personal details
- Born: 30 October 1938 Wellin, Belgium
- Died: 23 October 2021 (aged 82) Comblain-au-Pont, Belgium
- Party: PSC

Cyrille Tahay (30 October 1938 – 23 October 2021) was a Belgian politician. He was a member of the Humanist Democratic Centre (cdH), formerly known as the Christian Social Party (PSC). He served as Mayor of Comblain-au-Pont from 1989 to 2004 and held a seat in the Parliament of Wallonia from 1995 to 1999.
