= Luigi Reitani =

Italian literary scholar, translator, and Germanist (1959–2021)

- Born: 18 July 1959; Foggia, Apulia, Italy
- Died: 31 October 2021 (aged 62); Berlin, Germany
- Occupations: Germanist, translator and literary critic

Luigi Reitani (18 July 1959 – 31 October 2021) was an Italian literary scholar, translator and Germanist.

== Biography ==
Reitani studied Italian and German literature at the University of Bari, where he received his doctorate in 1983 with a thesis on Arthur Schnitzler. In 1984–85 and from 1986 to 1991, he spent several years studying and researching in Vienna with Wendelin Schmidt-Dengler.

In 1991, Reitani became assistant, associate professor in 2000 and full professor for modern German literature at the University of Udine in 2005. He was visiting professor at the University of Klagenfurt and at the University of Basel. From 2008 to 2013, he was head of the cultural department (City Councilor for Culture) of the city of Udine. From October 2015 to September 2019, he headed the Italian Cultural Institute in Berlin. He was a board member of the Hölderlin Society in Tübingen and a member of the scientific advisory board of the Free German High Foundation in Frankfurt. In 2010, he was awarded the Golden Decoration of Honour for Services to the Republic of Austria.

Reitani was married and the father of two children. He died of complications from COVID-19 in Berlin at the age of 62.

== Work ==
Reitani was an editor and translator of an annotated bilingual edition of the entire poetry of Friedrich Hölderlin (Milano: Mondadori 2001; International Mondello Prize for Literary Translation 2002). He translated and commented on Italian editions of works by German-speaking authors (including Ingeborg Bachmann, Thomas Bernhard, Elfriede Jelinek, Ernst Jandl, Uwe Johnson, Friederike Mayröcker, Friedrich Schiller, Arthur Schnitzler, Josef Winkler). He wrote cultural articles for various daily newspapers and for the Italian radio and was co-editor of the literary series "Anemoni" at the publishing house "Marsilio" in Venice.
