= Fernando de Parias Merry =

Spanish politician (1937–2021)

Mayor of Seville
- In office June 1975 – December 1977
- Preceded by: Rafael Ariza Jiménez
- Succeeded by: José Ramón Pérez de Lama

Member of the Cortes Españolas
- In office October 1975 – June 1977

Personal details
- Born: 27 July 1937 Seville, Spain
- Died: 31 October 2021 (aged 84) Seville, Spain
- Party: FET y de las JONS

Fernando de Parias Merry (27 July 1937 – 31 October 2021) was a Spanish politician. A member of the FET y de las JONS, he served as Mayor of Seville and on the Cortes Españolas from 1975 until its disbanding in 1977. He voted in favor of the Political Reform Act and headed the Seville city council's transition to democracy.
