= Germain Sengelin =

French judge (1937–2021)

Germain Sengelin (8 August 1937 – 9 October 2021) was a French judge who worked in Mulhouse in France. He worked on organized crime related affairs, and was a judge in the Air France Flight 296 accident.

== Sources ==
- Fabrizio Calvi, L'Europe des parrains : La Mafia à l'assaut de l'Europe
