= Richard W. Hanselman =

American businessman (1927–2021)

Richard Wilson Hanselman
- Born: October 8, 1927; Cincinnati, Ohio, USA
- Died: October 1, 2021 (aged 93); Nashville, Tennessee, USA
- Education: Dartmouth College
- Occupation: Businessman
- Spouse: Beverly Baker White Hanselman
- Children: Jane
- Parent(s): Wendell and Helen Hanselman

Richard W. Hanselman (October 8, 1927 - October 1, 2021) was an American businessman. He served as the chief executive officer of Genesco from 1981 to 1986, and as its chairman from 1984 to 1986. He died in Nashville, Tennessee.
