= Proterios Pavlopoulos =

Greek Orthodox prelate (1946–2021)

Proterios Pavlopoulos (Greek: Προτέριος Παυλόπουλος; 28 July 1946 – 20 October 2021) was an Eastern Orthodox bishop. He was the Metropolitan of Diospol under the Orthodox Church of Alexandria.

Born in 1946 in Koronos, Naxos, Proterios' collegiate level education was at the Higher Faculty of the University of Athens. His post-graduate education continued at Durham University in England, where he specialised in the field of patristics.

Pavlopoulos was ordained deacon and priest in 1972, by Methodios of Aksum. Over the following years, Proterios served in a number of countries including Ethiopia, Malta, Great Britain, South Africa, and Greece in various positions including chancellor and hierarchal vicar.

On 22 February 2001, Proterios was elected archbishop of the new Archdiocese of Dar es Salaam in eastern Tanzania by the Holy Synod. He was consecrated on 3 March 2001. On 27 October 2004 he was transferred to the see of the Metropolitan of Ptolemais.

Pavlopoulos died on 20 October 2021, at the age of 75.

Eastern Orthodox Church titles
Preceded by Parthenios Danielides	Metropolitan of Ptolemais; 27 October 2004 — 26 November 2014	Succeeded by Emmanuel Kagias
