= Uwe Grimm =

German mathematician (1963–2021)

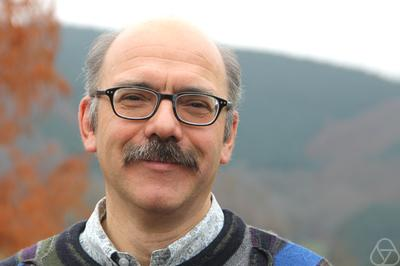
Grimm at Oberwolfach, 2014

Uwe Grimm (1963–2021) was a German mathematician and physicist. He was one of the pioneers in aperiodic tilings and their dynamical and spectral properties. He also worked in statistical physics and combinatorics.

Grimm was born on March 9, 1963, in Gütersloh, Germany. He earned his PhD from the University of Bonn in 1991 with a thesis in statistical mechanics on quantum spin chains and their symmetries, written under the supervision of Vladimir Rittenberg. After that he spent eight years as a postdoctoral researcher in Melbourne, Amsterdam and Chemnitz, where he completed his habilitation on the physics of aperiodic order. In 2000 he joined the Open University in Milton Keynes, where he became a professor in 2009. He was Head of the Department of Mathematics and Statistics from 2014 to 2016. He served as Co-editor of Acta Crystallographica Section A and was Chair of the IUCr Commission on Aperiodic Crystals from 2014 to 2017. He died on October 28, 2021, in Oxford, UK.

== Publications ==
- Baake, Michael; Grimm, Uwe, eds. (26 October 2017). Aperiodic Order. Cambridge University Press. doi:10.1017/9781139033862. ISBN 978-0-521-86992-8.
