= José Ramón Ceschi =

Argentine Catholic priest (1941–2021)

Jose Ceschi
- Born: José Ramón Ceschi; 9 January 1941; Province of Santa Fe, Argentina
- Died: 16 October 2021 (aged 80)
- Occupations: Catholic Priest, writer and TV Presenter

José Ramón Ceschi (9 January 1941 – 16 October 2021) was an Argentine Catholic priest, writer and TV presenter.

== Biography ==
José Ceschi was born on 9 January 1941 in La Penca, Province of Santa Fe, Argentina, began to dabble in religion when he was 16 years old, the age at which he made the novitiate and at 23 years old he was ordained a priest of the Franciscan order in the City of Rosario in 1964. He studied several languages in the United Kingdom and France, when he returned to Argentina he taught theology classes in the city of Rosario.

In 2017, he suffered a stroke in which he had to be intervened, since then his health was compromised. After this, he was the target of fake news on numerous occasions, about his condition of health.

== Death ==
On 16 October 2021, the San Francisco Solano de Rosario Parish confirmed Ceschi's death with a statement.
