= Miklós Zelei =

Hungarian writer and journalist (1948–2021)

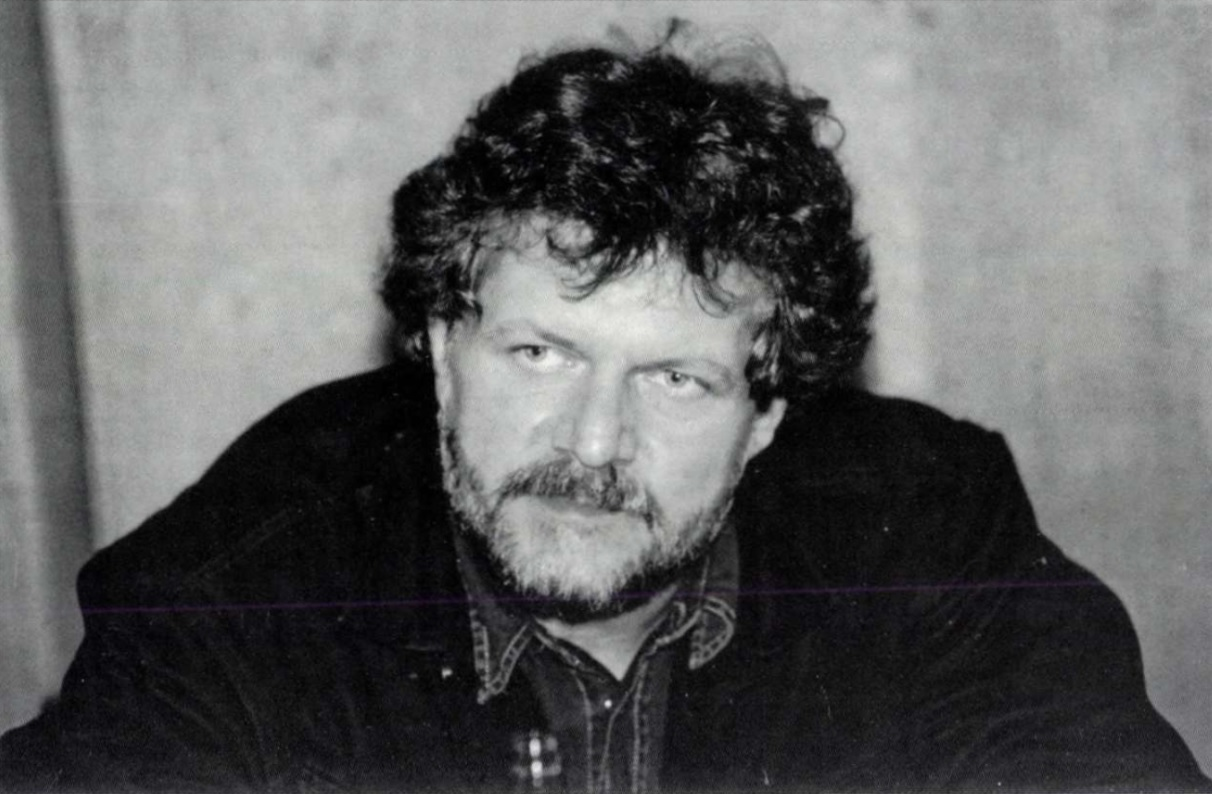
- Zelei in 2008
- Born: 8 November 1948; Kiskunhalas, Second Hungarian Republic
- Died: 28 October 2021 (aged 72)
- Occupations: Writer; Journalist

Miklós Zelei (Hungarian: Zelei Miklós; 8 November 1948 – 28 October 2021) was a Hungarian poet, writer, and journalist.

== Biography ==
Zelei graduated from the University of Szeged in 1973. He then studied at a journalism school and became editor-in-chief of the APN news agency. In 1977, he was awarded the Zsigmond Móricz Fellowship. From 1978 to 1986, he worked for the daily newspaper Magyar Hírlap and subsequently for Délmagyarország.

Zelei vocally called for an opening of the border between Mali Slemence and Veľké Slemence. His novel, A kettézárt falu, told the story of how this village was split in two.

Zelei died on 28 October 2021, at the age of 72.

== Works ==
- Alapítólevél (1980)
- Híd (1984)
- Szépséghibák (1986)
- Ágytörténetek (1988)
- A tolvajkulcs (1988)
- Tűz is volt, babám! Alapszerv Kárhelyen, 1957-58 (1989)
- Őrjítő mandragóra. Bevezetés a politikai pszichiátriába (1989)
- Az elrabolt emberöltő (1990)
- Hullaciróka (1998)
- Itt állunk egy szál megmaradásban (2000)
- A kettézárt falu (2000)
- Álljon fel! (2003)
- A halasi norma (2003)
- Hat vita (2005)
- A 342-es határkő (2006)
- Egyperces évszázad. In memoriam Örkény István novellapályázat / Abszurd flikk-flakk. Grafikai illusztrációk Örkény István szellemében (2012)
- Őrjítő mandragóra. Bevezetés a politikai pszichiátriába (2012)
- Situs inversus, az Isten balján (2013)
- Az elrabolt emberöltő. Bara Margit, Kahler Frigyes, Mérő László (2014)
- A kettézárt falu. Dokumentumregény (2017)
- Gyilkos idők. Epikus improvizációk (2020)
