= Serhiy Burimenko =

Ukrainian footballer and coach (1970–2021)

Personal information
- Full name: Serhiy Leonidovych Burimenko
- Date of birth: 2 September 1970
- Place of birth: Mykolaiv, Ukrainian SSR, Soviet Union
- Date of death: 18 October 2021 (aged 51)
- Place of death: Mykolaiv, Ukraine
- Height: 1.70 m (5 ft 7 in)
- Position: Midfielder

Youth career
- 198?–1987: Sudnobudivnyk Mykolaiv

Senior career*
Years	Team	Apps	(Gls)
1988	Sudnobudivnyk Mykolaiv	2	(0)
1989–1993	Artania Ochakiv	98	(12)
1993–1994	Evis Mykolaiv	50	(3)
1995–1996	Naftokhimik Kremenchuk	52	(2)
1996	Kremin Kremenchuk	7	(0)
1996	Hirnyk-Sport Komsomolsk	3	(0)
1997	SC Mykolaiv	13	(0)
1998	Polihraftekhnika Oleksandriya	9	(0)
1998–1999	SC Mykolaiv	16	(0)
1999	Torpedo Zaporizhzhia	16	(0)
2000–2003	Kohtla-Järve Lootus	58	(7)
2001	→ Tamme Auto Kiviõli (loan)	?	(4)
2002	→ Sillamäe Kalev (loan)	5	(0)

International career
1995	Ukraine (students)		

Managerial career
- 2003–2013: Mykolaiv youth (assistant)
- 2013–2021: Mykolaiv youth (director)
- * Club domestic league appearances and goals

Serhiy Burimenko (Ukrainian: Сергій Леонідович Буріменко; 2 September 1970 – 18 October 2021) was a Ukrainian professional footballer who played as a midfielder player and later worked as a youth coach.

== Career ==
Born in Mykolaiv, Burimenko was a product of the local Sudnobudivnyk Mykolaiv youth sportive school system. His first trainer was Oleksandr Chunikhin. On 10 October 1988, he made a professional debut for his club in the match against FC Desna Chernihiv.

His football career also included other Ukrainian clubs from different leagues (including Vyshcha Liha). He also spent three years as Estonian legionnaire. In 1995, as a member of the Ukraine national student football team, he participated in the Universiade in Japan. Then in Fukuoka, Ukrainian students under the coach Volodymyr Lozynskyi took fourth place.

After retirement from playing career, he worked as children's football trainer in MFC Mykolaiv and was a director of its youth sportive school since 2013.
