= Francesco de Notaris =

Italian politician and journalist (1944–2021)

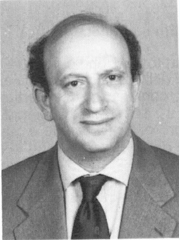

Member of the Senate of the Republic of Italy
- In office 15 April 1994 – 8 May 1996
- Constituency: Castellammare di Stabia

Personal details
- Born: 22 October 1944 Rome, Italy
- Died: 28 October 2021 (aged 77) Milan, Italy
- Party: The Network

Francesco de Notaris (22 October 1944 – 28 October 2021) was an Italian politician. A member of The Network, he served in the Senate of the Republic from 1994 to 1996.
