= Victor V. Zhenchenko =

Ukrainian poet, translator, and singer (1936–2021)

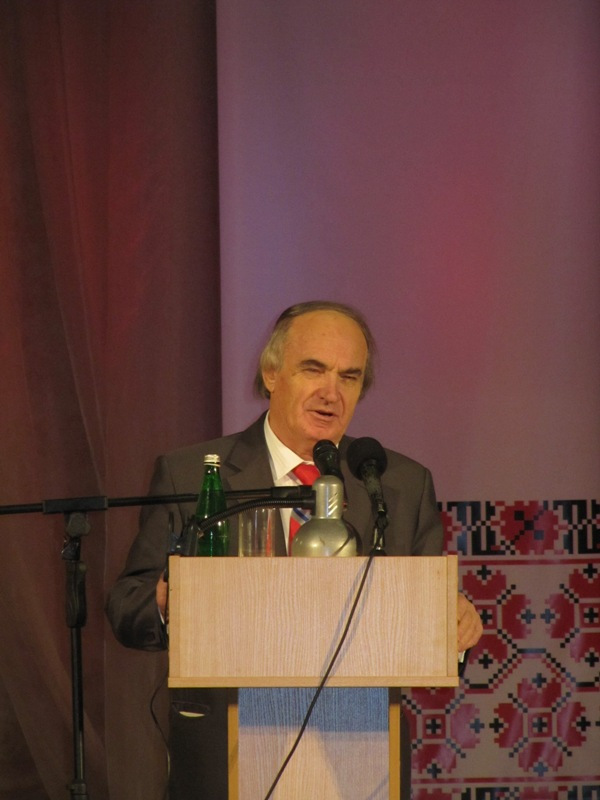
- Born: 11 October 1936; Obolon, Kyiv, Kyiv Oblast, Ukrainian SSR, Soviet Union
- Died: 28 October 2021 (aged 85); Kyiv, Ukraine

Viktor Zhenchenko (Ukrainian: Віктор Васильович Женченко; 11 October 1936 – 28 October 2021) was a Ukrainian poet, translator and singer.

He worked in the Donetsk Opera and Ballet Theater.

== Education ==
Graduated from Kharkiv National Kotlyarevsky University of Arts.

== Awards ==
- Winner of the literary prize of Andriy Malyshko.
- Honored Artist of the Ukrainian SSR
- Recipient of the title of Merited Artist of Ukraine
