= Piet Wijnberg =

Dutch footballer (1957–2021)

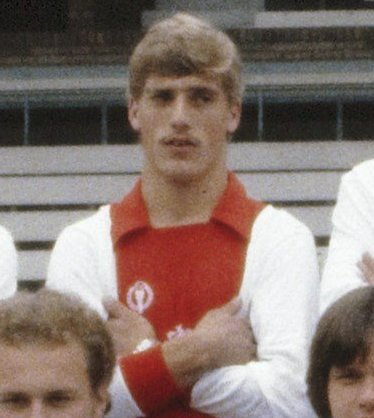

Personal information
- Date of birth: 20 October 1957
- Place of birth: Hilversum, Netherlands
- Date of death: October 2021 (aged 63)
- Position: Central defender

Youth career
- SC 't Gooi

Senior career*
Years	Team	Apps	(Gls)
1976–1978	Utrecht	0	(0)
1978–1983	Ajax	44	(1)
1981	→ Go Ahead Eagles (loan)	12	(0)
1982–1983	→ NEC (loan)	31	(0)
1983–1985	DS'79	56	(0)
1985–1990	Sparta	142	(8)
- FC Hilversum
Total		285	(9)

International career
1979	Netherlands U21	3	(0)
1986	Netherlands Olympic	1	(0)
- * Club domestic league appearances and goals

Piet Wijnberg (20 October 1957 – October 2021) was a Dutch professional footballer who played as a central defender for SC 't Gooi, Utrecht, Ajax, Go Ahead Eagles, NEC, DS'79, Sparta and FC Hilversum. He also represented the Netherlands at under-21 and Olympic levels.
