= 2021 in music =

This topic covers notable events and articles related to 2021 in music

== Specific locations ==
- African music
- American music
- Asian music
- Australian music
- Brazilian music
- British music
- Canadian music
- Chinese music
- Czech music
- Danish music
- European music
- Finnish music
- French music
- German music
- Icelandic music
- Indian music
- Indonesian music
- Irish music
- Italian music
- Japanese music
- Latin music
- Malaysian music
- Mongolian music
- Norwegian music
- Philippine music
- Polynesian music
- Scandinavian music
- South Korean music
- Swedish music
- Taiwanese music
- Vietnamese music

== Specific genres ==
- Classical
- Country
- Electronic
- Jazz
- Latin
- Heavy metal
- Hip-hop
- Progressive rock
- Rock
- K-pop

== Awards ==
63rd Annual Grammy Awards (USA)
Record of the Year: "Everything I Wanted" by Billie Eilish • Album of the Year: Folklore by Taylor Swift • Song of the Year: "I Can't Breathe" by H.E.R. • Best New Artist: Megan Thee Stallion
2021 Billboard Music Awards (USA)
Top Artist: The Weeknd • Top Male Artist: The Weeknd • Top Female Artist: Taylor Swift • Top New Artist: Pop Smoke • Top Duo/Group: BTS • Top Billboard 200 Album: Shoot for the Stars, Aim for the Moon by Pop Smoke • Top Hot 100 Song: "Blinding Lights" by The Weeknd
2021 Brit Awards (UK)
British Album of the Year: Future Nostalgia by Dua Lipa • British Single: "Watermelon Sugar" by Harry Styles • British Breakthrough Act: Arlo Parks • British Group: Little Mix
Juno Awards (Canada)
Artist of the Year: The Weeknd • Group of the Year: Arkells • Album of the Year: After Hours by The Weeknd • Single of the Year: "Blinding Lights" by The Weeknd
2021 MTV Video Music Awards (USA)
Video of the Year: "Montero (Call Me by Your Name)" by Lil Nas X • Best New Artist: Olivia Rodrigo • Artist of the Year: Justin Bieber
2021 MTV Europe Music Awards (Europe)
Best Song: "Bad Habits" by Ed Sheeran • Best Video: "Montero (Call Me by Your Name)" by Lil Nas X • Best Artist: Ed Sheeran • Best New: Saweetie
2021 American Music Awards (USA)
Artist of the Year: BTS • New Artist of the Year: Olivia Rodrigo • Collaboration of the Year: "Kiss Me More" by Doja Cat featuring SZA
Pulitzer Prize for Music (USA)
Stride by Tania León
Rock and Roll Hall of Fame (USA)
Inductees: Foo Fighters • The Go-Go's • Jay-Z • Carole King • Todd Rundgren • Tina Turner
Mercury Prize (UK)
Collapsed in Sunbeams by Arlo Parks
Polar Music Prize (Sweden)
Event cancelled as result of COVID-19 pandemic
Polaris Music Prize (Canada)
Parallel World by Cadence Weapon
Eurovision Song Contest 2021 (Europe)
"Zitti e buoni" by Måneskin (Italy)
30th Seoul Music Awards (South Korea)
Grand Prize: BTS • Best Album: Map of the Soul: 7 by BTS • Best Song: "Dynamite" by BTS • Best New Artist: Enhypen, Treasure, Aespa

== Bands formed ==
- ≠Me
- Alamat
- ASP
- Be First
- BGYO
- Bini
- Billlie
- Blitzers
- BugAboo
- Ciipher
- Dexter and the Moonrocks
- Ekko Astral
- Epex
- Feeble Little Horse
- Ho6la
- Hot Issue
- Howl Owl Howl
- Ichillin'
- INI
- Ive
- Joey Valence & Brae
- Just B
- KAIA
- Kingdom
- The Last Dinner Party
- Lightsum
- Luminous
- Lovejoy
- Mamagama
- Mirae
- The Morris Springfield Project
- Naniwa Danshi
- NTX
- Omega X
- P1X3L
- Pixy
- Purple Kiss
- Rocket
- Silk Sonic
- The Smile
- T1419
- Tri.be
- Xdinary Heroes
- The Waeve
- The Warning
- WJSN The Black

== Soloist debuts ==
- Adora
- Addison Rae
- Ai Hashimoto
- Aguri Ōnishi
- Angela Ken
- Angelina Jordan
- Ansonbean
- Ayra Starr
- Ayuni D
- BamBam
- Bella Poarch
- Belle Mariano
- Blaster
- Chlöe
- Diarra Sylla
- D.O.
- Do Han-se
- Edan Lui
- Elaiza Ikeda
- El Noba
- Gayle
- Gigi De Lana
- Hiroki Moriuchi
- Ice Spice
- I.M
- IShowSpeed
- Jay B
- Jinyoung
- Jo Yu-ri
- Joao Constancia
- Joy
- Kanako Momota
- Kwon Eun-bi
- L
- Lee Seung-hyub
- Leung Yip
- Lili
- Lisa
- Luke Hemmings
- Lyca Gairanod
- Marika Kouno
- Masato Hayakawa
- MC Cheung Tin-fu
- Miyu Honda
- Nathan Evans
- Nicholas Hamilton
- Olivia Rodrigo
- Park So-yeon
- PinkPantheress
- Reina Kondō
- Rie Takahashi
- Rosa Linn
- Rosé
- Sorn
- Takanori Iwata
- Takuya Eguchi
- Tyla
- Wendy
- Winka Chan
- Yailin La Más Viral
- Young K
- Youngjae
- Yugyeom
- Yuqi

== Bands reformed ==
- Fugees
- Big Time Rush
- C AllStar
- The Boo Radleys
- Defleshed
- Ellis, Beggs & Howard
- Faces
- Gang of Four
- Macklemore & Ryan Lewis
- New Radicals
- Mudvayne
- No Angels
- Porcupine Tree
- Shadows Fall
- TO1

== Bands on hiatus ==
- ALI
- Alphabeat
- Dogleg
- Got7
- Kariyushi58
- Lovelyz
- Silent Siren
- Suchmos
- Tokyo Performance Doll

== Bands disbanded ==
- 100%
- 1Team
- AŌP
- Ayumikurikamaki
- Beach Slang
- Berry Good
- Blackalicious
- Blu-Billion
- Brand X
- Butterfly Child
- Black Peaks
- Cabaret Voltaire
- Cellchrome
- Los Chunguitos
- Lotus Eater
- Commander Cody and His Lost Planet Airmen
- CY8ER
- Chromatics
- Daft Punk
- Datblygu
- Demons & Wizards
- Desurabbits
- Deutsch Amerikanische Freundschaft
- The Fat Boys
- GFriend
- Golden Earring
- Hollywood Monsters
- Iris
- Iz*One
- Maison Book Girl
- MKTO
- The Monkees
- Omega
- OnePixcel
- Ought
- Pink Cres.
- The Posies
- Poco
- Potty Mouth
- The Preatures
- Rascal Flatts
- Return to Forever
- Sakura Gakuin
- SGO48
- Shine
- Sly and Robbie
- Stereo Total
- sixx:A.M.
- Tenth Avenue North
- Thao & the Get Down Stay Down
- V6
- Yuck

== Deaths ==
=== January ===
- 1
  - Carlos do Carmo, 81, Portuguese fado singer
  - Misty Morgan, 75, American country music singer (Jack Blanchard & Misty Morgan)
  - Liam Reilly, 65, Irish folk rock singer and keyboardist (Bagatelle)
  - Jan Vering, 65, German gospel singer
- 3
  - Gerry Marsden, 78, English rock singer and guitarist (Gerry and the Pacemakers)
  - Warren McLean, Australian rock drummer (Machinations, I'm Talking, Divinyls)
- 4 – Alexi Laiho, 41, Finnish death metal singer and guitarist (Children of Bodom) (death announced on this date)
- 5 – John Georgiadis, 81, British classical violinist and conductor
- 6 – Paul de Leon, 52, American metal drummer (Las Cruces)
- 7
  - Deezer D, 55, American rapper and actor
  - Genival Lacerda, 89, Brazilian forro singer
  - Jamie O'Hara, 70, American country music singer-songwriter (The O'Kanes)
- 8
  - Ed Bruce, 81, American country music singer-songwriter
  - Michael Fonfara, 74, Canadian blues and rock keyboardist (The Electric Flag, Rhinoceros, Downchild Blues Band)
  - Uno Loop, 91, Estonian singer and guitarist
  - Elijah Moshinsky, 75, Australian opera director
- 10 – Thorleif Torstensson, 71, Swedish dansband singer, guitarist and saxophonist (Thorleifs)
- 11
  - Howard Johnson, 79, American jazz multi-instrumentalist
  - Mark Keds, 50, British pop punk singer (Senseless Things)
  - Don Miller, 80, American pop singer (The Vogues)
- 12 – Ron Getman, 72, American country rock guitarist and singer (The Tractors)
- 13
  - Tim Bogert, 76, American psychedelic rock bassist (Vanilla Fudge, Cactus, Beck, Bogert & Appice)
  - Duke Bootee, 69, American rapper, producer and songwriter
  - Sylvain Sylvain, 69, American glam rock guitarist (New York Dolls)
- 14
  - Duranice Pace, 62, American gospel singer (The Anointed Pace Sisters)
  - Larry Willoughby, 73, American country music singer-songwriter
- 16
  - Jason Cope, 43, American country guitarist (The Steel Woods)
  - Pave Maijanen, 70, Finnish rock keyboardist (Hurriganes, Dingo)
  - Claudia Montero, 58, Argentine classical composer
  - Phil Spector, 81, American record producer, pop musician (The Teddy Bears), and songwriter
- 17
  - Ghulam Mustafa Khan, 89, Indian classical singer
  - Junior Mance, 92, American jazz pianist
  - Sammy Nestico, 96, American jazz composer and arranger
- 18
  - Perry Botkin Jr., 87, American composer and arranger
  - Maria Koterbska, 96, Polish swing and jazz singer
  - Jimmie Rodgers, 87, American pop singer
- 20 – Joe Jordan, 79, American pop singer and musician (The Jordan Brothers)
- 21
  - Randy Parton, 67, American country music singer-songwriter
  - Marc Phillips, 66, American rock singer (Hotel) and record producer
  - Aleksey Zubov, 84, Russian jazz saxophonist and composer
- 22
  - Narendra Chanchal, 80, Indian religious singer
  - Guem, 73, Algerian jazz singer
  - James Purify, 76, American R&B singer (James & Bobby Purify)
- 23
  - Jonas Gwangwa, 83, South African jazz trombonist (The Jazz Epistles)
  - Gabriel Ruiz Díaz, 45, Argentine alternative rock bassist (Catupecu Machu)
- 24 – Tom Stevens, 64, American alternative country bassist (The Long Ryders)
- 25 – Iron, 29, South Korean rapper
- 26
  - Cara O'Sullivan, 59, Irish opera singer
  - 6 Dogs, 21, American rapper
- 27 – Trung Kiên, 81, Vietnamese classical singer
- 28
  - César Isella, 82, Argentine folk singer and guitarist (Los Fronterizos)
  - Sibongile Khumalo, 63, South African jazz and classical singer
  - Singing Sandra, 63, Trinidadian calypso singer
  - Rick Shaw, 79, American folk singer and string guitarist (The Hillside Singers)
- 29
  - Ahmed Achour, 75, Tunisian classical composer and conductor
  - Grady Gaines, 86, American blues saxophonist
  - Jeremy Lubbock, 89, English arranger and composer
  - Hilton Valentine, 77, English rock guitarist (The Animals)
- 30
  - Double K, 43, American rapper (People Under the Stairs)
  - Sophie, 34, Scottish electronic singer-songwriter and producer
  - Alla Yoshpe, 83, Russian pop singer
- 31 – Wambali Mkandawire, Malawian jazz singer

=== February ===
- 1
  - Chuck Kaye, 80, American music industry executive
  - Temur Tsiklauri, 75, Georgian pop singer (VIA Iveria)
- 2 – Aaron Wegelin, American indie rock drummer (Elf Power)
- 3
  - Anne Feeney, 69, American folk singer-songwriter
  - Jim Weatherly, 77, American pop and country music singer-songwriter
- 4
  - Stefan Cush, 60, British folk-punk singer and guitarist (The Men They Couldn't Hang)
  - Matt Harris, American power pop bassist (The Posies)
  - Jessie Smith, 79, American R&B singer (The Ikettes)
  - Nolan Porter, 71, American R&B singer-songwriter
  - Gil Saunders, American soul singer (Harold Melvin & the Blue Notes)
- 5
  - Abdoul Jabbar, 40, Guinean dance singer
  - Douglas Miller, 71, American gospel singer
  - Örs Siklósi, 29, Hungarian metalcore singer (AWS)
- 7
  - Elliot Mazer, 79, American record producer and audio engineer
  - Stefano Mazzonis di Pralafera, 71, Italian opera director (Opéra Royal de Wallonie)
  - Ricardo Silva Elizondo, 67, Mexican pop singer
- 8
  - Roza Akkuchukova, 70, Russian pop singer
  - Servando Cano Rodríguez, 78, Mexican Tejano singer-songwriter
  - Mary Wilson, 76, American R&B singer (The Supremes)
- 9
  - Chick Corea, 79, American jazz fusion keyboardist and composer (Return to Forever, Chick Corea Elektric Band)
  - Cedrick Cotton, 46, American R&B singer (Ideal)
  - Ghédalia Tazartès, 73, French musique concrète multi-instrumentalist
- 10
  - Jon Mark, 77, English pop singer-songwriter and guitarist (Mark-Almond)
  - Lee Sexton, 92, American bluegrass banjoist
- 11 – Joel Pina, 100, Portuguese fado guitarist (Amália Rodrigues)
- 12 – Milford Graves, 79, American jazz drummer (New York Art Quartet)
- 13
  - Louis Clark, 73, British symphonic rock conductor and keyboardist (Electric Light Orchestra, ELO Part II, Royal Philharmonic Orchestra)
  - Sydney Devine, 81, British country and skiffle singer
- 14
  - Erriquez, 60, Italian folk rock singer and guitarist (Bandabardò)
  - Ari Gold, 47, American R&B singer
- 15
  - Steuart Bedford, 81, British classical conductor and pianist
  - Lucien Gourong, 77, French cabaret singer
  - Andréa Guiot, 93, French opera singer
  - Raymond Lévesque, 92, French chanson singer
  - Johnny Pacheco, 85, Dominican salsa multi-instrumentalist (Fania All-Stars) and record producer
- 16
  - Carman, 65, American contemporary Christian singer
  - Tonton David, 53, French reggae singer
- 17
  - Françoise Cactus, 57, German indie rock singer and drummer (Stereo Total)
  - Ali Hossain, 80, Bangladeshi classical composer
  - U-Roy, 78, Jamaican reggae singer
- 18
  - Prince Markie Dee, 52, American rapper (The Fat Boys)
  - Miles Seaton, 41, American indie rock singer and multi-instrumentalist (Akron/Family)
- 19
  - Đorđe Balašević, 67, Serbian rock singer (Rani Mraz)
  - James Burke, 70, American soul singer (Five Stairsteps)
  - Jerold Ottley, 86, American choral conductor (Mormon Tabernacle Choir)
- 20
  - Joe Burke, 81, Irish folk accordionist
  - Richard Shephard, 71, British classical conductor
  - Gene Taylor, 68, American rock keyboardist (The Blasters, Canned Heat, The Fabulous Thunderbirds)
- 21 – Hélène Martin, 92, French chanson singer
- 22 – Yalchin Rzazadeh, 74, Azerbaijani pop singer
- 23 – Sean Kennedy, 35, Australian metalcore bassist (I Killed The Prom Queen, Deez Nuts)
- 24 – Sardool Sikander, 60, Indian folk singer
- 26 – Bob James, 68, American hard rock singer (Montrose)
- 27 – Danilo Rustici, 72, Italian progressive rock guitarist (Osanna)
- 28
  - Anna Kast, 39, Russian EDM singer (Little Big)
  - Ian North, 68, American power pop singer and guitarist (Milk 'N' Cookies, Neo)
  - Jorge Oñate, 71, Colombian vallenato singer

=== March ===
- 1 – Ralph Peterson Jr., 58, American jazz drummer (Out of the Blue, The Jazz Messengers)
- 2
  - Chris Barber, 90, English jazz bandleader and trombonist
  - Mark Goffeney, 51, American rock bassist
  - Radim Pařízek, 67, Czech heavy metal drummer (Citron)
  - Bunny Wailer, 73, Jamaican reggae singer and songwriter (Bob Marley and the Wailers)
- 3
  - Medea Abrahamyan, 88, Armenian classical cellist
  - Duffy Jackson, 67, American jazz drummer
- 4
  - Alan Cartwright, 75, English rock bassist (Procol Harum)
  - Barbara Ess, 72, American post-punk multi-instrumentalist (Y Pants, Disband)
  - Helmut Winschermann, 100, German classical oboist, and conductor (Deutsche Bachsolisten)
- 5
  - Anna Shuttleworth, 93, British classical cellist
  - Michael Stanley, 72, American rock singer-songwriter and guitarist
- 6 – Carmel Quinn, 95, Irish-American pop singer
- 7
  - Sanja Ilić, 69, Serbian folk rock keyboardist (San, Balkanika)
  - Josky Kiambukuta, 72, Congolese rumba singer (TPOK Jazz)
  - Lars-Göran Petrov, 49, Swedish heavy metal singer and drummer (Entombed, Entombed A.D., Morbid)
- 9 – James Levine, 77, American classical conductor and pianist (Metropolitan Opera)
- 8
  - Adrian Bărar, 61, Romanian heavy metal guitarist and composer (Cargo)
  - James Mac Gaw, French progressive rock guitarist (Magma)
- 11
  - Ray Campi, 86, American rockabilly musician
  - Jewlia Eisenberg, 50, American avant-rock singer (Charming Hostess)
  - Florentín Giménez, 95, Paraguayan classical and folk pianist
- 12 – Maximiliano Djerfy, 46, Argentine alternative rock guitarist (Callejeros)
- 14
  - Eulalio Cervantes, 52, Mexican rock saxophonist (Maldita Vecindad)
  - Reggie Warren, 52, American R&B singer (Troop)
- 15
  - Dragoljub Đuričić, 58, Serbian rock and jazz drummer (YU Grupa, Kerber, Leb i sol)
  - Doug Parkinson, 74, Australian pop and jazz singer (Fanny Adams, The Life Organisation)
- 16 – Bill Irvine, 87, American rock and roll pianist (Chuck Alaimo Quartet)
- 17
  - Matt Miller, 34, American indie rock keyboardist (Titus Andronicus)
  - Freddie Redd, 92, American jazz keyboardist
  - Corey Steger, 42, American metalcore guitarist (Underoath)
- 18 – Paul Jackson, 73, American jazz fusion bassist (The Headhunters, Azteca)
- 19
  - Cristián Cuturrufo, 48, Chilean jazz trumpeter
  - Gary Leib, 65, American new wave keyboardist (Rubber Rodeo)
- 20
  - Constance Demby, 81, American new age keyboardist and dulcimer player
  - Taryn Fiebig, 49, Australian opera singer
  - Yevgeny Nesterenko, 83, Russian opera singer
  - Dan Sartain, 39, American garage rock and rockabilly singer-songwriter
- 23
  - Don Heffington, 70, American roots rock drummer (Lone Justice, Watkins Family Hour)
  - Hana Hegerová, 89, Slovak chanson singer
  - Peter Viskinde, 67, Danish rock guitarist (Malurt, Big Fat Snake)
- 25 – Tavish Maloney, 24, American emo guitarist (Oso Oso)
- 26 – Brett Bradshaw, 50, American glam metal drummer (Faster Pussycat)
- 28 – Malcolm Cecil, 84, British jazz bassist and synthesizer player (Tonto's Expanding Head Band, Blues Incorporated, The Jazz Couriers)
- 29
  - Jerry Burgan, 76, American folk rock guitarist (We Five)
  - Hans Kinds, 74, Dutch blues rock guitarist (Cuby + Blizzards)
- 30 – Willie Schofield, 81, American R&B singer-songwriter (The Falcons)
- 31
  - Anzor Erkomaishvili, 80, Georgian folk singer
  - Jadwiga Wysoczanská, 93, Czech opera singer

=== April ===
- 1 – Tony Pola, Australian blues-rock drummer (Beasts of Bourbon, Kim Salmon and the Surrealists)
- 2
  - Shaukat Ali, 76, Pakistani folk singer
  - Morris "B.B." Dickerson, 71, American funk bassist and singer (War)
  - Gabi Luncă, 82, Romanian lăutărească singer
  - Nelu Ploieşteanu, 70, Romanian lăutărească singer
- 3
  - Earl Bulinski, 72, American rock musician (The Electras)
  - Jill Corey, 85, American pop singer
- 4 – Paul Humphrey, 60, Canadian new wave singer (Blue Peter)
- 5
  - Haja El Hamdaouia, 91, Moroccan aita and chaabi singer
  - Krzysztof Krawczyk, 74, Polish pop singer and composer
- 6 – Predrag Živković Tozovac, 85, Serbian folk singer
- 9 – DMX, 50, American rapper
- 10
  - Shay Healy, 78, Irish pop songwriter
  - Bob Petric, American indie rock guitarist (Thomas Jefferson Slave Apartments)
  - Bosse Skoglund, 85, Swedish blues drummer
- 11
  - Mita Haque, 58, Bangladeshi Rabindra Sagreet singer
  - Zoran Simjanović, 74, Serbian classical composer and rock keyboardist (Siluete, Elipse)
- 13
  - Farid Ahmed, 66, Bangladeshi film composer
  - Leonid Bortkevich, 71, Belarusian folk rock singer (Pesniary)
  - Rocco Filippini, 77, Swiss classical cellist
- 14
  - Michel Louvain, 83, Canadian pop singer
  - Rusty Young, 75, American country rock singer-songwriter and guitarist (Poco)
- 15 – Barby Kelly, 45, Spanish-born German folk singer (The Kelly Family)
- 16
  - Barry Mason, 85, British pop songwriter
  - Mike Mitchell, 77, American rock guitarist (The Kingsmen)
- 17 – Black Rob, 52, American rapper
- 18
  - Lew Lewis, British pub rock harmonica player (Eddie and the Hot Rods)
  - Paul Oscher, 71, American blues singer
  - Lars Ranzenberger, 53, German-born Spanish power metal bassist (Metalium)
- 19 – Jim Steinman, 73, American rock lyricist, composer, pianist, and record producer
- 20 – Les McKeown, 65, Scottish pop rock singer (Bay City Rollers)
- 21
  - Lea Dali Lion, 47, Estonian pop singer
  - Joe Long, 88, American pop rock bassist (The Four Seasons)
- 22 – Shock G, 57, American rapper (Digital Underground)
- 23
  - Fredi, 78, Finnish novelty pop singer
  - Milva, 81, Italian pop singer
- 25
  - Denny Freeman, 76, American blues guitarist
  - Rajan Mishra, 70, Indian khyal sarangi player (Rajan and Sajan Mishra)
- 27 – Paul Couter, 72, Belgian rock guitarist (TC Matic)
- 28
  - Toni Dalli, 87, Italian pop singer
  - Anita Lane, 61, Australian alternative rock singer-songwriter (Nick Cave and the Bad Seeds)
  - Liuwe Tamminga, 67, Dutch classical harpsichordist and organist
- 29
  - Johnny Crawford, 75, American pop singer
  - John Hinch, 73, British heavy metal drummer (Judas Priest, Bakerloo)
  - Tony Markellis, 68, American jam band bassist (Trey Anastasio Band)
  - Will Mecum, 48, American stoner rock guitarist (Karma to Burn, Year Long Disaster)
- 30
  - John Dee Holeman, 92, American blues guitarist
  - Anthony Payne, 84, British classical composer
  - Ray Reyes, 51, Puerto Rican pop singer (Menudo, El Reencuentro)

=== May ===
- 1
  - Debu Chaudhuri, 85, Indian classical sitarist
  - Wondress Hutchinson, 56, American dance singer (Mantronix)
- 2 – Tommy West, 78, American music producer and pop singer-songwriter (Cashman & West)
- 3
  - Phil Naro, 63, American hard rock singer (Talas)
  - Lloyd Price, 88, American R&B singer-songwriter
- 4
  - Rodolfo García, 75, Argentine psychedelic rock drummer (Almendra, Aquelarre)
  - Nick Kamen, 59, English pop singer-songwriter
  - Genji Kuniyoshi, 90, Japanese folk singer
- 6
  - Comagan, 48, Indian playback singer
  - Vanya Kostova, 64, Bulgarian pop singer (Tonika)
  - Prem Dhoj Pradhan, 82, Nepali pop singer and guitarist
  - Pervis Staples, 85, American gospel singer (The Staple Singers)
- 7
  - G. Anand, 67, Indian playback singer
  - Vanraj Bhatia, 93, Indian film composer
  - Cassiano, 77, Brazilian funk and soul singer-songwriter
- 8
  - Curtis Fuller, 86, American jazz trombonist (The Jazz Messengers)
  - Ghenady Meirson, 63, Soviet-born American pianist and vocal coach
- 10
  - Svante Thuresson, 68, Swedish jazz and schlager singer (Gals and Pals)
  - Pauline Tinsley, 93, British opera singer
- 12 – Maran, 48, Indian gaana singer
- 13
  - Norman Simmons, 91, American jazz pianist and arranger
  - Jack Terricloth, 50, American dark cabaret singer (The World/Inferno Friendship Society)
  - Bill Tsamis, 60, American metal guitarist (Warlord)
- 14 – Ester Mägi, 99, Estonian classical composer
- 15
  - Đorđe Marjanović, 89, Serbian schlager and pop singer
  - Mario Pavone, 80, American jazz bassist
- 16
  - Patsy Bruce, 81, American country songwriter
  - MC Kevin, 23, Brazilian funk carioca singer
- 17
  - Nicolas Ker, 50, French electronic singer (Poni Hoax)
  - Neal Ford, 78, American psychedelic rock singer (Neal Ford and the Fanatics)
  - Amarendra Mohanty, 63, Indian film composer and singer
- 18 – Franco Battiato, 76, Italian progressive rock and new wave singer-songwriter
- 19
  - Johnny Ashcroft, 94, Australian country and folk singer-songwriter
  - Alix Dobkin, 80, American folk singer-songwriter and guitarist
  - Martin Turnovský, 92, Czech classical conductor
- 20 – Roger Hawkins, 75, American rock and soul drummer (Muscle Shoals Rhythm Section)
- 22 – Glenn Douglas Tubb, 85, American country singer-songwriter
- 23
  - Dewayne Blackwell, 84, American country songwriter
  - Lorrae Desmond, 93, Australian cabaret singer and actress
- 24
  - John Davis, 66, American dance pop singer (Milli Vanilli)
  - Samuel E. Wright, 74, American pop singer and actor
- 25 – Søren Holm, 25, Danish indie pop singer (Liss)
- 26
  - Tom Shannon, 82, American radio DJ, songwriter and musician (The Rebels)
  - Patrick Sky, 80, American folk singer-songwriter
- 27
  - Tiit Haagma, 67, Estonian progressive rock bassist (Ruja)
  - Shantiraj Khosla, 54, Indian film composer and singer
  - Nelson Sargento, 96, Brazilian samba singer
- 28
  - Zohra Abdullayeva, 68, Azerbaijani mugham singer
  - Jimi Bellmartin, 71, Indonesian-born Dutch funk singer
- 29
  - B. J. Thomas, 78, American pop singer
  - Johnny Trudell, 82, American jazz trumpeter
- 31 - Lil Loaded, 20, American rapper

=== June ===
- 3 – Karla Burns, 66, American opera singer
- 6 – Michele Merlo, 28, Italian pop singer-songwriter
- 7 – David C. Lewis, American soft rock and new age keyboardist (Ambrosia, Shadowfax)
- 8
  - Farhad Humayun, 42, Pakistani psychedelic rock drummer and singer (Overload)
  - Dean Parrish, 78, American soul singer
- 9 – Juan Nelson, 62, American blues rock bassist (Ben Harper and the Innocent Criminals)
- 10 – Fran McKendree, 74, American folk rock singer-songwriter and guitarist (McKendree Spring)
- 11
  - Heribert Beissel, 88, German classical composer
  - Jon Lukas, 72, Maltese pop singer
- 14 – Selçuk Tekay, 68, Turkish classical composer and violinist
- 16 – Novica Zdravković, 73, Serbian folk singer
- 17 – Fane Flaws, 70, New Zealand rock guitarist (The Crocodiles, The Spats, Blerta)
- 18
  - Gift of Gab, 50, American rapper (Blackalicious)
  - Takeshi Terauchi, 82, Japanese surf rock guitarist
- 20
  - Jeanne Lamon, 71, American-Canadian classical violinist and conductor
  - Lionel Leroy, 65, French pop singer
  - Gianna Rolandi, 68, American opera singer
- 21
  - Nobuo Hara, 94, Japanese jazz saxophonist
  - Mamady Keïta, 70, Guinean djembe player
  - Pat Lupo, 66, American rock bassist (John Cafferty and the Beaver Brown Band)
- 22 – Parassala B. Ponnammal, 96, Indian Carnatic singer
- 23
  - David Edwards, 56, Welsh post-punk singer (Datblygu)
  - Ellen McIlwaine, 75, American-Canadian psychedelic rock and blues singer and slide guitarist (Fear Itself)
  - Peter Zinovieff, 88, British electronic composer and founder of Electronic Music Studios
- 25
  - Rinaldo Rafanelli, 71, Argentine psychedelic rock singer (Color Humano, Sui Generis)
  - Wes, 57, Cameroonian world music singer
- 26
  - Jon Hassell, 84, American jazz trumpeter
  - Frederic Rzewski, 83, American classical pianist and composer
  - Johnny Solinger, 55, American hard rock singer (Skid Row)
- 27
  - Willy Crook, 55, Argentine new wave saxophonist (Patricio Rey y sus Redonditos de Ricota)
  - Peps Persson, 74, Swedish blues and reggae singer
- 28
  - Burton Greene, 84, American free jazz pianist
  - Paul Koulak, 78, French television composer
- 29
  - John Lawton, 74, British rock singer (Uriah Heep, Lucifer's Friend, Les Humphries Singers)
  - Bryan St. Pere, 53, American alternative rock drummer (Hum)

=== July ===
- 1
  - Louis Andriessen, 82, Dutch classical composer
  - Steve Kekana, 62, South African soul and Mbaqanga singer
- 4
  - Sanford Clark, 85, American rockabilly singer
  - Rick Laird, 80, Irish jazz fusion bassist (Mahavishnu Orchestra, Brian Auger and the Trinity)
- 5 – Raffaella Carrà, 78, Italian pop singer
- 6 – David King, American alternative rock guitarist (Mary's Danish)
- 9 – Andy Williams, 49, American Christian rock drummer (Casting Crowns)
- 10
  - Barbara Allbut, 80, American pop singer (The Angels)
  - Byron Berline, 77, American bluegrass fiddler
  - Chris Hutka, American post-hardcore singer (The Bunny the Bear)
- 11
  - Juini Booth, 73, American jazz bassist (The Sun Ra Arkestra)
  - Sound Sultan, 44, Nigerian rapper
- 13 – Brother Resistance, 67, Trinidadian rhythm poet
- 14
  - Gary Corbett, American blues rock keyboardist (Cinderella)
  - Jeff LaBar, 58, American glam metal and blues rock guitarist (Cinderella)
- 15
  - Joe Cassidy, Irish indie pop singer-songwriter (Butterfly Child)
  - Boris Goryachev, 49, Russian a capella singer (Turetsky Choir Art Group)
  - Pyotr Mamonov, 70, Russian alternative rock singer-songwriter (Zvuki Mu)
  - Tsepo Tshola, 67, Mosotho afro-jazz singer (Sankomota)
- 16 – Biz Markie, 57, American rapper
- 17
  - Dolores Claman, 94, Canadian television composer and pianist
  - Robby Steinhardt, 71, American progressive rock singer and violinist (Kansas)
  - Graham Vick, 67, English opera director
- 19
  - Tolis Voskopoulos, 80, Greek laïko singer
  - Chuck E. Weiss, 76, American blues rock singer-songwriter
- 20 – Jerry Granelli, 80, American-born Canadian jazz drummer
- 21
  - Tõnu Aare, 67, Estonian rock singer and multi-instrumentalist (Apelsin)
  - Clarence McDonald, 76, American pianist, composer, arranger, and producer
- 22
  - Pavel Pelc, 71, Czech art rock bassist and singer (Progres 2)
  - Peter Rehberg, 53, Austrian-British electronic musician (KTL) and founder of Mego
- 23
  - Fakir Alamgir, 71, Bangladeshi folk singer
  - Wally Gonzales, 71, Filipino blues rock guitarist (Juan de la Cruz Band)
- 25 – Count M'Butu, 75-76, American blues-rock percussionist (The Derek Trucks Band) (death announced on this date)
- 26
  - Mike Howe, 55, American heavy metal singer (Metal Church, Heretic)
  - Joey Jordison, 46, American heavy metal drummer and guitarist (Slipknot, Murderdolls, Scar the Martyr, Sinsaenum)
- 27
  - Dusty Hill, 72, American blues rock bassist and singer (ZZ Top)
  - Willie Winfield, 91, American doo-wop singer (The Harptones)
- 28
  - Giuseppe Giacomini, 80, Italian opera singer
  - Shahram Kashani, 47, Iranian pop singer
  - Johnny Ventura, 81, Dominican salsa and merengue singer
- 29 – Gonzoe, 45, American rapper (Kausion)
- 30
  - Jacob Desvarieux, 65, Guadeloupean-French zouk singer
  - Tom LeGarde, 90, Australian country music singer and guitarist (The LeGarde Twins)
- 31 – Jerzy Matuszkiewicz, 93, Polish jazz saxophonist

=== August ===
- 1
  - Paul Cotton, 78, American country rock singer-songwriter and guitarist (Poco, Illinois Speed Press)
  - Kazimierz Kowalski, 70, Polish opera singer
- 3
  - Kelli Hand, 56, American techno DJ
  - Allan Stephenson, 71, British classical cellist and composer
- 4
  - Razzy Bailey, 82, American country singer
  - Jean "Binta" Breeze, 65, Jamaican dub poet
  - Paul Johnson, 50, American house DJ
  - Stan Lark, 81, American rock and roll bassist (The Fireballs)
  - Anders Pettersson, 69, Swedish dansband keyboardist (Lasse Stefanz)
- 6
  - Les Vandyke, 90, British pop songwriter
  - Wang Wenjuan, 94, Chinese yue opera singer
- 7 – Dennis Thomas, 70, American funk saxophonist (Kool & The Gang)
- 9
  - Joey Ambrose, 87, American rock and roll saxophonist (Bill Haley & His Comets)
  - Killer Kau, 23, South African rapper
  - Mpura, 26, South African rapper
  - Chucky Thompson, 53, American record producer
- 11
  - Mike Finnigan, 76, American rock and jazz keyboardist
  - Roy Gaines, 83, American electric blues guitarist
  - Caroline Peyton, 69, American folk singer-songwriter
- 12 – Ronnell Bright, 91, American jazz pianist
- 13
  - Baba Zumbi, 49, American rapper (Zion I)
  - Nanci Griffith, 68, American folk singer-songwriter
  - Pil Trafa, 62, Argentine punk rock singer (Los Violadores)
- 14 – R. Murray Schafer, 88, Canadian avant-garde classical composer
- 15 – Jagjit Kaur, 91, Indian playback singer
- 16 – Hormoz Farhat, 93, Iranian-American classical composer
- 17 – Squeak, 26, American hip hop producer (Pivot Gang)
- 20
  - Tom T. Hall, 85, American country singer-songwriter
  - Larry Harlow, 82, American salsa keyboardist (Fania All-Stars)
  - Peter Ind, 93, British jazz bassist
  - Michael Morgan, 64, American classical conductor
- 21
  - Bill Emerson, 83, American bluegrass banjoist
  - Don Everly, 84, American country-rock and roll singer and songwriter (The Everly Brothers)
- 22
  - Charles Burles, 85, French opera singer
  - Bob Fish, 72, British doo-wop singer (Darts)
  - Brian Travers, 62, British pop and reggae saxophonist and songwriter (UB40)
  - Eric Wagner, 62, American doom metal singer (Trouble, The Skull)
- 23
  - Fritz McIntyre, 62, British pop keyboardist (Simply Red)
  - Olli Wisdom, 63, British goth rock singer (Specimen) and Goa trance producer
- 24
  - Pierre Dutot, 75, French classical trumpeter
  - Charlie Watts, 80, English rock drummer (The Rolling Stones)
- 25 – Dave Harper, British indie rock drummer (Frankie & The Heartstrings)
- 26 – Kenny Malone, 83, American country drummer
- 27 – Siegfried Matthus, 87, German composer and conductor
- 29
  - Ron Bushy, 79, American psychedelic rock drummer (Iron Butterfly)
  - John Drake, 74, American rock singer (The Amboy Dukes)
  - Lee "Scratch" Perry, 85, Jamaican reggae singer-songwriter and producer
- 30 – Lee Williams, 75, American gospel singer (Lee Williams and the Spiritual QC's)
- 31 – Nobesuthu Mbadu, 76, South African mbaqanga singer (Mahotella Queens)

=== September ===
- 1
  - Adalberto Álvarez, 72, Cuban son pianist (Son 14, Adalberto Álvarez y su Son)
  - Carol Fran, 87, American soul blues singer and pianist
  - Marty Fried, 77, American rock drummer (The Cyrkle)
  - Aleksandr Khrabunov, 61, Russian rock guitarist (Zoopark)
- 2
  - Alemayehu Eshete, 80, Ethiopian jazz singer
  - MadClip, 34, Greek-American rapper
  - Mikis Theodorakis, 96, Greek classical and film composer
- 4
  - Billy Cafaro, 84, Argentine rock singer
  - Gerhard Erber, 86, German classical pianist
- 5
  - Rickie Lee Reynolds, 72, American rock guitarist (Black Oak Arkansas)
  - Sarah Harding, 39, British pop singer (Girls Aloud)
- 6
  - Sunil Perera, 68, Sri Lankan pop and baila singer (The Gypsies)
  - Bennie Pete, 45, American jazz and funk sousaphonist (Hot 8 Brass Band)
- 7 – Warren Storm, 84, American swamp pop singer and drummer
- 8
  - Susan Anway, 70, American indie rock singer (The Magnetic Fields)
  - Uno Loop, 91, Estonian estrada, pop and jazz singer, guitarist and music educator
  - Pulamaipithan, 85, Indian film lyricist
- 9 – Amanda Holden, 73, British classical librettist
- 10
  - Michael Chapman, 80, British folk singer-songwriter and guitarist
  - Rick Newell, 73, British psychedelic rock bassist (Rainbow Ffolly)
  - Rick Yancey, 73, American pop-rock singer and guitarist (Cymarron, The Remingtons)
- 11 – María Mendiola, 69, Spanish pop singer (Baccara)
- 12 – Don Maddox, 90, American country singer (Maddox Brothers and Rose)
- 13 – George Wein, 95, American jazz pianist and co-founder of the Newport Jazz Festival and Newport Folk Festival
- 14 – Vicente Zarzo Pitarch, 83, Spanish classical French horn player
- 15
  - Norman Bailey, 88, British opera singer
  - Leonard Gibbs, 73, American jazz percussionist
- 16
  - Jane Powell, 92, American pop singer
  - George Mraz, 77, Czech-born American jazz bassist and saxophonist (Quest, New York Jazz Quartet, The Thad Jones/Mel Lewis Orchestra)
- 17 – Dottie Dodgion, 91, American jazz drummer
- 19
  - Sylvano Bussotti, 89, Italian classical composer
  - András Ligeti, 68, Hungarian classical violinist
  - Mats Paulson, 83, Swedish pop singer-songwriter
  - Marina Tucaković, 67, Serbian folk and pop lyricist
- 20
  - Colin Bailey, 87, British-American jazz drummer
  - Sarah Dash, 76, American R&B and funk singer (Labelle)
  - Claude Lombard, 76, Belgian pop singer
  - Julz Sale, British post-punk singer-songwriter and guitarist (Delta 5)
  - Warner Williams, 91, American blues guitarist (Little Bit A Blues)
- 21
  - Richard H. Kirk, 65, British electronic and industrial multi-instrumentalist (Cabaret Voltaire, Sweet Exorcist)
  - La Prieta Linda, 88, Mexican pop singer
- 22
  - Bob Moore, 88, American country bassist
  - Jan Stanienda, 68, Polish classical violinist
- 23 – Sue Thompson, 96, American pop and country singer
- 24 – Pee Wee Ellis, 80, American jazz and soul saxophonist
- 25 – Patricio Manns, 84, Chilean folk singer-songwriter
- 26
  - George "Commander Cody" Frayne IV, 77, American country rock singer and keyboardist (Commander Cody and His Lost Planet Airmen)
  - Alan Lancaster, 72, British rock bassist (Status Quo, The Party Boys)
- 27
  - Darrell Bath, British punk guitarist (The Vibrators, The Dogs D'Amour)
  - Chris Ho, Singaporean new wave singer (Zircon Lounge)
  - Andrea Martin, 49, American R&B singer-songwriter
  - Teymur Mirzoyev, 85, Azerbaijani jazz singer (Gaya Quartet)
- 28
  - Nana Ampadu, 76, Ghanaian highlife singer and guitarist
  - Karan Armstrong, 79, American opera soprano
  - Pete Fullerton, 75, American folk rock bassist and singer (We Five)
  - Phi Nhung, 49, Vietnamese-American Vọng cổ singer
  - Barry Ryan, 72, British pop singer
  - Lonnie Smith, 79, American jazz organist
- 29
  - Hayko, 48, Armenian pop singer
  - Olivier Libaux, 57, French new wave and lounge guitarist (Nouvelle Vague)
  - Mike Renzi, 80, American jazz pianist and composer
- 30
  - Lennart Åberg, 79, Swedish jazz fusion saxophonist
  - Carlisle Floyd, 95, American opera composer
  - Greg Gilbert, 44, British indie rock singer and guitarist (Delays)

=== October ===
- 1
  - Raymond Gniewek, 89, American classical violinist
  - Robin Morton, 81, Irish folk singer and bodhran player (The Boys of the Lough)
  - Ewert Ljusberg, 76, Swedish folk singer
- 2
  - John Rossall, 75, English glam rock saxophonist and trombonist (The Glitter Band)
  - Sebastião Tapajós, 78, Brazilian folk guitarist
- 3 – Anouman Brou Félix, 86, Ivorian attie multi-instrumentalist
- 5 – Pat Fish, 64, British indie pop singer and guitarist (The Jazz Butcher)
- 8
  - Everett Morton, 71, Kittian-British ska drummer (The Beat)
  - Jim Pembroke, 65, British-Finnish progressive rock singer (Wigwam, Blues Section)
  - Jem Targal, 74, American psychedelic rock bassist (Third Power)
- 9 – Dee Pop, 65, American post-punk drummer (Bush Tetras, The Gun Club)
- 10 – Luis de Pablo, 91, Spanish classical composer
- 11
  - Misko Barbara, 49, Ukrainian rock singer (Dead Rooster)
  - Deon Estus, 65, American R&B bassist and singer
- 12 – Paddy Moloney, 83, Irish Celtic folk multi-instrumentalist (The Chieftains, Ceoltóirí Chualann)
- 13 – Andrea Haugen, 45, German heavy metal singer
- 14
  - Emani 22, 22, American R&B singer
  - Phil Leadbetter, 59, American bluegrass resonator guitarist
  - Tom Morey, 86, American jazz drummer
- 15 – Regi Hargis, 70, American funk guitarist and singer (Brick)
- 16
  - Tom Gray, 70, American new wave and blues rock singer-songwriter and keyboardist (The Brains, Delta Moon)
  - Ron Tutt, 83, American rock drummer (TCB Band, Jerry Garcia Band)
- 17 – Bruce Gaston, 74, American Thai classical multi-instrumentalist
- 18
  - Franco Cerri, 95, Italian jazz guitarist and bassist
  - Edita Gruberová, 74, Slovak opera singer
- 19 – Leslie Bricusse, 90, British film and theater composer and lyricist
- 21
  - Tommy DeBarge, 64, American R&B-funk bassist and singer (Switch)
  - Dmitriy Galitsky, 65, Russian pop singer and keyboardist (Sinyaya Ptitsa)
  - Bernard Haitink, 92, Dutch classical conductor and violinist
  - Sergei Krinitzin, 65, Russian progressive rock drummer (Autograph)
  - Robin McNamara, 74, American pop rock singer-songwriter
  - Allan Wilmot, 96, Jamaican-born British pop singer (The Southlanders)
- 22
  - Jay Black, 82, American pop-rock singer (Jay and the Americans)
  - Udo Zimmermann, 78, German opera and classical composer and conductor
- 24
  - Willie Cobbs, 89, American blues singer and harmonica player
  - Sonny Osborne, 83, American bluegrass banjoist (Osborne Brothers)
- 25 – Alfredo Diez Nieto, 103, Cuban classical composer and conductor
- 26 – Rose Lee Maphis, 98, American country singer
- 27
  - Letieres Leite, 61, Brazilian afro-jazz composer and conductor (Orkestra Rumpilezz)
  - William Shelby, 65, American funk keyboardist (Lakeside, Dynasty)
  - Benjamin Vallé, 47, Swedish post-punk guitarist (Viagra Boys)
- 28 – Raša Đelmaš, 71, Serbian progressive rock drummer (YU Grupa, Zebra, Pop Mašina)
- 30 – Fan Tsai, 26, Taiwanese indie rock drummer (No Party for Cao Dong)

=== November ===
- 1
  - Emmett Chapman, 85, American jazz guitarist and inventor of the Chapman Stick
  - Nelson Freire, 77, Brazilian classical pianist
  - Gilberto Grácio, 85, Portuguese luthier
  - Pat Martino, 77, American jazz guitarist
- 2
  - Sabah Fakhri, 88, Syrian Muwashshah and Qudud Halabiya singer
  - Declan Mulligan, 83, Irish-born American rock guitarist and bassist (The Beau Brummels)
  - Ernest Wilson, 69, Jamaican reggae singer (The Clarendonians)
  - Ronnie Wilson, 73, American funk multi-instrumentalist (The Gap Band)
- 3 – Georgie Dann, 81, French pop singer
- 4 – Mario Lavista, 78, Mexican film composer
- 5 – Marília Mendonça, 26, Brazilian sertanejo singer-songwriter
- 6
  - Astro, 64, British reggae singer and percussionist (UB40)
  - Andy Barker, 53, British acid house keyboardist and bassist (808 State)
  - Barry Coope, English folk singer (Coope Boyes and Simpson)
  - Marinko Rokvić, 67, Bosnian folk singer
- 7
  - Clifford Grant, 91, Australian opera singer
  - Bopol Mansiamina, 72, Congolese soukous guitarist (Les Quatre Étoiles)
- 8 – Margo Guryan, 84, American pop singer-songwriter
- 10
  - Mike “Bones” Gersema, American hard drummer (L.A. Guns)
  - John Kinsella, 81, Irish classical composer
  - Miroslav Žbirka, 69, Slovak rock singer (Modus)
- 11
  - Graeme Edge, 80, British progressive rock drummer (The Moody Blues)
  - Mark Gillespie, Australian pop singer-songwriter
  - John Goodsall, 68, American-British progressive rock and jazz fusion guitarist (Brand X, Atomic Rooster)
- 13 – Philip Margo, 79, American doo-wop singer (The Tokens)
- 15 – Heber Bartolome, 73, Filipino folk singer
- 16 – Belinda Sykes, 55, British medieval folk singer and multi-instrumentalist (Joglaresa)
- 17
  - Keith Allison, 79, American garage rock bassist (Paul Revere & the Raiders)
  - Dave Frishberg, 88, American jazz pianist and songwriter
  - Theuns Jordaan, 50, South African blues singer-songwriter
  - Young Dolph, 36, American rapper
- 18
  - Slide Hampton, 89, American jazz trombonist
  - Ack van Rooyen, 91, Dutch jazz trumpeter and flugelhornist
- 19
  - Hank von Hell, 49, Norwegian punk singer (Turbonegro)
  - David Longdon, 56, British progressive rock singer and multi-instrumentalist (Big Big Train)
- 20
  - Jim Gallagher, 78, American surf rock drummer (The Astronauts)
  - Billy Hinsche, 70, American pop singer, guitarist and keyboardist (Dino, Desi & Billy)
  - Merima Njegomir, 68, Serbian sevdah singer
- 21
  - Yul Anderson, 63, American blues and gospel singer, guitarist and pianist
  - Gurmeet Bawa, 77, Indian folk singer
  - Gordon Crosse, 83, British classical composer
- 22
  - Joanne Shenandoah, 63, American folk singer-songwriter and guitarist
  - Asya Sultanova, 98, Azerbaijani classical composer
- 23 – Tatyana Chudova, 77, Russian classical composer
- 24
  - Mārtiņš Brauns, 70, Latvian pop and theater composer and multi-instrumentalist
  - Marilyn McLeod, 82, American R&B singer-songwriter
  - Gared O'Donnell, 44, American post-hardcore singer and guitarist (Planes Mistaken for Stars)
- 25 – Betty Jean Robinson, 88, American country music singer-songwriter
- 26 – Stephen Sondheim, 91, American film and theater composer and lyricist
- 28
  - Alexander Gradsky, 72, Russian rock singer and composer
  - Laila Halme, 87, Finnish pop singer
  - Meñique, 87, Panamanian salsa singer
- 30
  - Sirivennela Seetharama Sastry, 66, Indian film and theatre lyricist and singer
  - Martin Wright, British alternative rock guitarist (Intastella)

=== December ===
- 1
  - Grand Jojo, 85, Belgian pop singer
  - Alvin Lucier, 90, American experimental composer and sound artist
- 2 – Abdel Karim al Kabli, 89, Sudanese folk singer and oud player
- 4
  - Thoppil Anto, 81, Indian playback singer
  - Stonewall Jackson, 89, American country music singer
- 5
  - John Miles, 72, British progressive rock singer-songwriter
  - Toni Santagata, 85, Italian folk singer
  - Bill Staines, 74, American folk singer-songwriter
- 6 – János Kóbor, 78, Hungarian progressive rock singer (Omega)
- 7
  - Steve Bronski, 61, Scottish new wave keyboardist (Bronski Beat)
  - DJ Scholar, British grime rapper (Ruff Sqwad)
  - Greg Tate, 63, American multi-genre guitarist (Burnt Sugar) and music critic
- 8
  - Gil Bridges, 80, American rock saxophonist (Rare Earth)
  - Barry Harris, 91, American jazz pianist
  - Chandidas Mal, 92, Indian classical singer
  - Robbie Shakespeare, 68, Jamaican reggae bassist (Sly and Robbie) and record producer
  - Ralph Tavares, 79, American R&B singer (Tavares)
- 9 – David Lasley, 74, American pop and R&B singer
- 10
  - Les Emmerson, 77, Canadian rock singer-songwriter and guitarist (Five Man Electrical Band)
  - Mensi, British punk rock singer (Angelic Upstarts)
  - Michael Nesmith, 78, American rock and country singer, songwriter and guitarist (The Monkees, The First National Band)
- 11 – Garth Dennis, 72, Jamaican reggae singer (Black Uhuru, The Wailing Souls)
- 12 – Vicente Fernández, 81, Mexican ranchera singer
- 13
  - Joe Simon, 85, American R&B and soul singer
  - Toby Slater, 42, British indie pop singer-songwriter (Catch)
- 14 – Phil Chen, 81, Jamaican rock and reggae bassist (Manzarek–Krieger, Butts Band)
- 15
  - Francisco Kröpfl, 90, Argentine classical composer
  - Wanda Young, 78, American R&B singer (The Marvelettes)
- 16
  - Hub, 62, American hip hop bassist (The Roots)
  - Terry Uttley, 70, British rock bassist (Smokie)
  - Ian Worang, 47, Canadian indie rock singer and guitarist (Uncut)
- 17
  - John Morgan, 80, English Scrumpy and Western drummer (The Wurzels)
  - Weerasak Sunthornsri, 71, Thai folk rock guitarist (Caravan)
  - Lindsay Tebbutt, Australian pub rock drummer (The Choirboys)
- 18
  - Custom, 54, Canadian alternative rock singer-songwriter
  - Tam Harvey, Scottish folk guitarist (The Humblebums)
  - Kangol Kid, 55, American rapper (UTFO)
  - Renée Martel, 74, Canadian country singer
- 19
  - Billy Conway, 66, American blues rock and alternative rock drummer (Morphine, Treat Her Right)
  - Drakeo the Ruler, 28, American rapper
  - Carlos Marín, 53, Spanish classical crossover singer (Il Divo)
- 20 – Paul Mitchell, American R&B singer (The Floaters)
- 21 – Anthony Williams, 90, Trinidadian steelband steel pan player
- 23
  - Robin Le Mesurier, 68, British rock guitarist
  - Emil Ramsauer, 103, Swiss pop bassist (Takasa)
- 24
  - J. D. Crowe, 84, American bluegrass banjo player (New South)
  - Marco Mathieu, 57, Italian hardcore punk bassist (Negazione)
  - Meor Aziddin Yusof, 54, Malaysian folk singer-songwriter
- 25 – Tiffini Hale, 46, American pop singer (The Party)
- 27 – Victor Socaciu, 68, Romanian folk singer and composer
- 29
  - Paolo Giordano, 59, Italian classical guitarist
  - Peter Klatzow, 76, German classical composer and pianist
- 30 – Stephen J. Lawrence, 82, American television composer
- 31
  - Juraj Filas, 66, Serbian classical composer
  - Ivan Mozgovenko, 97, Russian classical clarinetist

== Musical films ==
- Anita

== See also ==
- Timeline of musical events
- Women in Music
- Impact of the COVID-19 pandemic on the music industry
