= 2021 in African music =

The following is a list of events and releases that happened in 2021 in African music.

== Events ==
- 14 March – At the 63rd Annual Grammy Awards, Nigerian musician Burna Boy wins the Grammy Award for Best Global Music Album and is among the live performers.
- 18 June – South African soprano Masabane Cecilia Rangwanasha wins the Song Prize at the BBC Cardiff Singer of the World competition.
- 9 August – In recognition of South African Women's Day, Apple Music launches the third part of its Visionary Women campaign, celebrating female artists such as Makhadzi.
- October – CKay's "Love Nwantiti" becomes the most-watched music video on YouTube, the first song from Africa to achieve this.
- 14 November – The 8th African Muzik Magazine Awards takes place in Dallas, Texas.

== Albums released in 2021 ==
Release date	Artist	Album	Genre	Label	Ref
January 8	Monica Ogah	Different (EP)	Christian	Indie	
January 22	Ayra Starr	Ayra Starr (EP)	Afropop, R&B, neo-soul	Mavin Records	
January 29	KaniBeatz & Bella Alubo	Chrystical (EP)	Pop	Lightcastle Music Global	
February 4	Joeboy	Somewhere Between Beauty and Magic	Afrobeats, Contemporary R&B	emPawa	
February 5	Femi Kuti & Made Kuti	Legacy +	AfroBeat/Jazz	Partisan	
April 9	Peruzzi	Rum & Boogie	Afrobeats	DMW	
April 23	Osibisa	New Dawn	High Life/Jazz/FunkRock	Marquee Records	
April 30	Laycon	Shall We Begin	Rap	Fierce Nation	
May 16	Kpanto	Sound from the Xtreetz	Hipco	Indie	
May 21	Mdou Moctar	Afrique Victime	Electronic	Matador	
June 18	Olamide	UY Scuti	Afropop	YBNL Nation Empire Distribution	
July 9	Les Filles de Illighadad	At Pioneer Works	Tuareg rock	Sahel Sounds	
July 23	Obongjayar and Sarz	Sweetness	Afrobeat		
August 6	Ayra Starr	19 & Dangerous	Afrobeat, R&B, trap, alté	Mavin Records	
September 3	Big Zulu	Ichwane Lenyoka	Rap, Hip hop	Inkabi Records	
September 3	Sarahmée	Poupée russe	Rap, Afropop	Ste=4 Musique	
September 9	Brymo	9: Èsan	Alternative rock; afro-soul; sentimental ballad; folk music	Indie	
September 9	Brymo	9: Harmattan & Winter	Alternative rock; afro-soul; sentimental ballad; folk music	Indie	
September 15	Tems	If Orange Was a Place	alt-R&B, Soul	RCA/Since '93	
October 26	Amerado	Patience (EP)	Hiphop/Afrobeat	MicBurnerz Music	
November 5	Zlatan	Resan			

== Musical films ==
- Neptune Frost, with music by Saul Williams

== Deaths ==
- January 8 – Dorine Mokha, 31, Congolese dancer and choreographer (malaria)
- January 22 – Guem, 73, Algerian singer, composer and dancer.
- January 23
  - Jonas Gwangwa, 83, South African jazz musician
  - Ahmed Achour, 75, Tunisian composer and conductor
- January 28 – Sibongile Khumalo, 63, South African singer
- January 31 – Wambali Mkandawire (Mtebeti Wambali Mkandawire), 68, Malawian jazz singer and activist.
- February 5 – Abdoul Jabbar, 40–41, Guinean singer-songwriter
- February 16 – Soul Jah Love, 31, Zimbabwean reggae/Zimdancehall musician (complications from diabetes)
- March 7 – Josky Kiambukuta, 72, Congolese singer (TPOK Jazz).
- March 14 – Thione Seck, 66, Senegalese mbalakh singer and musician
- April 5 – Haja El Hamdaouia, 91, Moroccan singer and songwriter, known for Chaabi and Aita
- April 18 – Naïma Ababsa, 51, Algerian singer
- April 27 – Sammy Kasule, 69, Ugandan musician and singer
- May 7 – Jamal Salameh, 75, Egyptian songwriter and composer
- June 21 – Mamady Keïta, 70, Guinean drummer
- June 22 – Mzilikazi Khumalo, 89, South African composer and academic
- June 25 – Wes Madiko, 57, Cameroonian singer
- July 1 – Steve Kekana, 63, South African singer
- July 11 – Sound Sultan (Olanrewaju Abdul-Ganiu Fasasi), 44, Nigerian rapper and hip hop pioneer (angioimmunoblastic T-cell lymphoma)
- August 3 – Allan Stephenson, 71, British-born South African cellist, conductor and composer
- August 9 (killed in car crash)
  - Khanya "The Voice" Hadebe, 20s, South African amapiano musician
  - Killer Kau, 23, South African amapiano musician
  - Mpura, 20s South African amapiano musician
- August 28 – Victor Uwaifo, 80, Nigerian ogbonge musician and cultural figure
- August 31 – Nobesuthu Mbadu, 76, South African mbaqanga singer
- September 2 – Alemayehu Eshete, 80, Ethiopian singer
- September 28 – Nana Ampadu, 76, Ghanaian musician
- October 3 – Anouman Brou Félix, 86, Ivorian Akyé musician
- October 8 – Rabah Driassa, 87, Algerian artist and folk singer
- November 7 – Bopol Mansiamina, 72, Congolese guitarist, vocalist, composer, and producer
- November 17 – Theuns Jordaan, 50, South African singer-songwriter (leukaemia)
- December 27 – Defao, 62, Congolese singer-songwriter, COVID-19.

== See also ==
- 2021 in music
