= 2021 in Asian music =

== Events ==
- January 7 – Neha Kakkar becomes the first Indian singer to win a YouTube Diamond Award.
- January 10 – Pakistani singer-songwriter Jawad Ahmad releases a protest song, ""Kisana", on social media, drawing attention to a farmers' protest movement in India and Pakistan.
- March 18 – Mumbai-based composer Joseph Conrad Mendoza is accused of borrowing the music and lyrics for his song "We Can Achieve" from "Count on me, Singapore", a national song composed by Hugh Harrison in 1986. Singapore's Ministry of Culture, holders of the copyright on the song, dispute Mendoza's claim that he wrote the song in the early 1980s and lost the original tapes in a flood.
- May 2 – The BBC selects Chinese-born percussionist Fang Zhang as the BBC Young Musician of 2020.
- June – Iwan Fals wins the Lifetime Achievement Award at the 2021 Telkomsel Awards. Other award winners include Tulus, Raisa and Noah.
- October 22 – Yes I Am Student is released, marking Punjabi singer Sidhu Moose Wala's debut as a film actor.

== Albums ==
- Aisyah Aziz – Pearls (10 September)
- Band-Maid – Unseen World (January 20)
- Chaya Czernowin – Heart Chamber
- Chai – Wink
- Jace Chan – Processing (May 14)
- Joyce Cheng – Joyce to the World (December 28)
- Gray – Grayground
- Kyuso Nekokami – Mormot Lab
- Lil Mariko – Lil Mariko
- MC Cheung Tin-fu – Have a Good Time (December 22)
- Mirror – One and all (January 20)
- Morissette – Signature (EP) (August 20)

== Classical ==
- Toshio Hosokawa – Violin Concerto (Genesis)

== Film, TV and video game scores ==
- Yuki Kajiura – Sword Art Online Progressive: Aria of a Starless Night
- Alam Khan – Swapner Thikana
- Devi Sri Prasad – Cirkus
- Akira Yamaoka – The Medium (video game)

== Musical films ==
- Anita, a movie about Cantopop singer Anita Mui
- Laal Singh Chaddha (India - Hindi), with music by Pritam
- Revue Starlight: The Movie (Japan)
- Sing a Bit of Harmony (Japan), with music by Ryō Takahashi
- Tangra Blues (India - Bengali), starring Parambrata Chatterjee, with music by Nabarun Bose

== Deaths ==
- January 4
  - Lee Heung-kam, 88, Cantonese opera star
  - Elias Rahbani, 82, Lebanese lyricist and composer (COVID-19)
  - Chacha Sherly, 29, Indonesian singer (traffic collision)
- January 5 – Vennelakanti, 63, Indian lyricist (heart attack)
- January 15 – Lệ Thu, 77, Vietnamese singer
- January 17 – Ghulam Mustafa Khan, 89, Indian classical singer
- January 22 – Narendra Chanchal, 80, Indian singer
- January 27 – Trung Kiên, 81, Vietnamese classical singer.
- February 4 – Ma Zenghui, 85, Chinese single-string performer
- February 15 – Golnoush Khaleghi, 80, Iranian music researcher, composer, and arranger.
- February 17 – Ali Hossain, 80, Bangladeshi composer
- February 18 – Isaac Thomas Kottukapally, about 73, Indian film score composer
- March 17 – Mayada Basilis, 54, Syrian singer (cancer)
- March 21 – Trisutji Kamal, 84, Indonesian composer
- March 29 – Keiko Toyama, 87, Japanese pianist
- March 30 – Diljaan, 31, Indian singer (traffic accident)
- April 2 – Shaukat Ali, 76, Pakistani folk singer
- April 11 – Mita Haque, 58, Bangladeshi Rabindra Sangeet singer (COVID-19)
- May 1 – Debu Chaudhuri, 85, sitarist (complications from COVID-19)
- May 4
  - Genji Kuniyoshi, 90, Japanese singer, person of Cultural Merit
  - Sarena Li, 31, Hong Kong singer (adenoid cystic carcinoma)
- May 6
  - Comagan, 48, Indian singer, composer and actor (COVID-19)
  - Prateek Chaudhuri, 49, Indian sitarist (COVID-19)
  - Prem Dhoj Pradhan, 82, Nepalese musician, singer and composer
- May 7
  - G. Anand, 67, Indian playback singer (COVID-19)
  - Vanraj Bhatia, 93, Indian film composer
- May 10 – Abdolvahab Shahidi, 98, Iranian barbat player, singer and composer
- May 12 – Maran, 48, Indian actor and singer (COVID-19)
- May 22 – Raamlaxman, 78, Indian composer
- June 5 – S. B. John, 86/87, Pakistani ghazal singer
- June 8 – Farhad Humayun, 42, Pakistani singer and drummer (Overload).
- June 18 – Takeshi Terauchi, 82, Japanese rock guitarist
- July 10 – Murali Sithara, 65, Indian composer and music director
- July 23 – Fakir Alamgir, 71, Bangladeshi folk and pop singer
- August 2 – Kalyani Menon, 80, Indian playback singer
- August 6 – Wang Wenjuan, 94, Chinese opera performer
- August 15 – Jagjit Kaur, 93, Indian Hindi/Urdu playback singer
- August 25 – Subhankar Banerjee, 55, Indian tabla player
- August 26 – JB Tuhure, 78, Nepali protest singer and politician
- September 7 – Tanwa Rasitanoo, 50, Thai Luk thung and Phleng phuea chiwit singer
- September 8 – Pulamaipithan, 85, Indian Tamil lyricist
- September 27 – Chris Ho, Singaporean singer (Zircon Lounge), musician and radio DJ, age unknown (stomach cancer)
- October 15 – Pornsak Songsaeng, 60, Thai luk thung and mor lam singer (heart attack)
- October 17 – Bruce Gaston, 74, American-born Thai classical musician
- October 22 – Janali Akbarov, 81, Azerbaijani khananda/mugham folk singer
- November 2 – Sabah Fakhri, 88, Syrian tenor
- November 12 – Lakshman Wijesekara, 73, Sri Lankan actor, singer and composer (Miss Jenis).
- November 21 – Gurmeet Bawa, 77, Indian Punjabi folk singer
- November 22 – Asya Sultanova, 98, Azerbaijani composer
- November 26 – Bichu Thirumala, 80, Indian Malayalam lyricist
- November 30 – Sirivennela Seetharama Sastry, 66, Indian Telugu lyricist
- December 4 – Thoppil Anto, 81, Indian playback singer and composer
- December 16 – Bogalay Tint Aung, 99, Burmese composer and writer

== By country ==
- 2021 in Chinese music
- 2021 in Japanese music
- 2021 in Philippine music
- 2021 in South Korean music

== See also ==
- 2021 in music
