= Teatr Wielki =

Teatr Wielki may refer to:

- Teatr Wielki, Łódź
- Teatr Wielki, Poznań
- Teatr Wielki, Warsaw
