= Michele Merlo =

Michele Merlo may refer to:

- Michele Merlo (cyclist)
- Michele Merlo (singer)

== See also ==
- Mike Merlo, Chicago politician
