= Buddhadeb =

Buddhadeb is a given name. Notable people with the name include:

- Buddhadeb Bhattacharjee (1944–2024), Indian politician and a member of the politburo of the Communist Party of India
- Buddhadeb Bosu (1908–1974), Indian Bengali writer of the 20th century
- Buddhadeb Dasgupta (1944–2021), Indian poet and prominent contemporary filmmaker
- Buddhadeb Guha (1936–2021), popular Bengali fiction writer
