= Rijuda =

ঋজুদা
- First appearance: Rijudar Songe Jongole
- Last appearance: Rijudar Songe Sufkore
- Created by: Buddhadeb Guha

In-universe information
- Full name: Riju Bose
- Nickname: Riju (ঋজু)
- Gender: Male
- Occupation: Adventure enthusiast and detective
- Relatives: Rudra
- Nationality: Indian
- Residence: Bishop Lefroy Road, Kolkata

Rijuda (Bengali: ঋজুদা) is a fictional character written by Buddhadeb Guha. Rijuda is an adventure enthusiast who explores jungles with his sidekick Rudra and also with Titir and Bhotkai who are the friends of Rudra. Rudra is the narrator of these stories. The jungles that he wrote about were mainly in Eastern India. He first appeared in Rijudar Songe Jongole, published April, 1973. Rijuda, who was a former hunter, later on became a conservator. The books of Rijuda teach us a great deal of things about the forests of India and about its beauty. It also knocks some moral sense into the readers.

== Stories of Rijuda ==
- Albino (Ananda Pub)
- Aro Dui Rijuda (Sahityam)
- Aro Dui Notun Rijuda Kahini (Sahityam)
- Saptam Ripu
- Teen Nombor
- Aro Tin Rijuda Kahini (Sahityam)
- Bagher Mangsho Ebong Onnyo Shikar (Ananda Pub)
- Bonobibir Bon e (Ananda Pub)
- Duti Rijuda Kahini (Sahityam, 2004)
- Gugunogumbarer Deshe (Ananda Pub)
- Langra Pahan (Ananda Pub)
- Moulir Raat (Ananda Pub)
- Ninikumari r Bagh (Ananda Pub)
- Rijuda Kahini (Sahityam)
- Kuruboker Deshe
- Projati Projapoti
- Jomduar
- Rijuda Samagra [1-5] (Ananda Pub, 1993)
- Rijudar Char Kahini (Sahityam, 2002)
- Rijudar Songe Jongole (Ananda Pub)
- Rijudar Songe Boxer Jongole Ebong (Ananda Pub)
- Rijudar Songe Lobongi Bone (Ananda Pub)
- Rijudar Songe Sodorbone o Anyanyo Golpo (Sahityam)
- Rijudar Songe Sufkor e (Ananda Pub)
- Ru Aha (Ananda Pub)
- Taar Baghoa (Ananda Pub)
- Tin Rijuda (Sahityam)
- Ashtam Ripu (Sharadiya Bartaman, 1427)
- Tin Rijuda (Sahityam)
