= 2021 in European music =

This article covers events in 2021 in continental European music, arranged in geographical order.

== Events ==
- 1 January – The Vienna Philharmonic's annual Neujahrskonzert, conducted by Riccardo Muti, takes place without a live audience for the first time in the history of the concert, as a result of the COVID-19 pandemic.
- 4 January – Dutch National Opera and Ballet announces that Stijn Schoonderwoerd will be its new general director (algemeen directeur), effective from 1 February.
- 22 February – Daft Punk, the French electronic music duo, breaks up after nearly 30 years together.

== Scandinavia ==
=== Top hits ===
- Danish number-one hits of 2021
- Finnish number-one singles of 2021, Finnish number-one albums of 2021
- Norwegian number-one songs in 2020
- Swedish number-one singles and albums in 2021

== Netherlands ==
- Dutch number-one singles of 2021

== Germany ==
- German number-one hits of 2021

== Switzerland and Austria ==
- Swiss number-one hits of 2021

== France ==
- French number-one hits of 2021

== Italy ==
- Italian number-one hits of 2021

== Eastern Europe/ Balkans ==
- List of Polish number-one singles of 2021
- Czech number-one songs of the 2020s
- Hungarian number-one singles of the 2020s

== Deaths ==
- 1 January
  - Carlos do Carmo, 81, Portuguese fado singer
  - Jan Vering, 65, German gospel singer
- 3 January – Tasso Adamopoulos, 76, Greek-French violist and pedagogue (from COVID-19)
- 4 January – Alexi Laiho, 41, Finnish death metal singer and guitarist (Children of Bodom) (death announced on this date)
- 10 January – Thorleif Torstensson, 71, Swedish dansband singer, guitarist and saxophonist (Thorleifs) (COVID-19)
- 16 January – Pave Maijanen, 70, Finnish rock keyboardist (Hurriganes, Dingo)
