= Kazimierz Kowalski =

Polish operatic bass and opera manager (1951–2021)

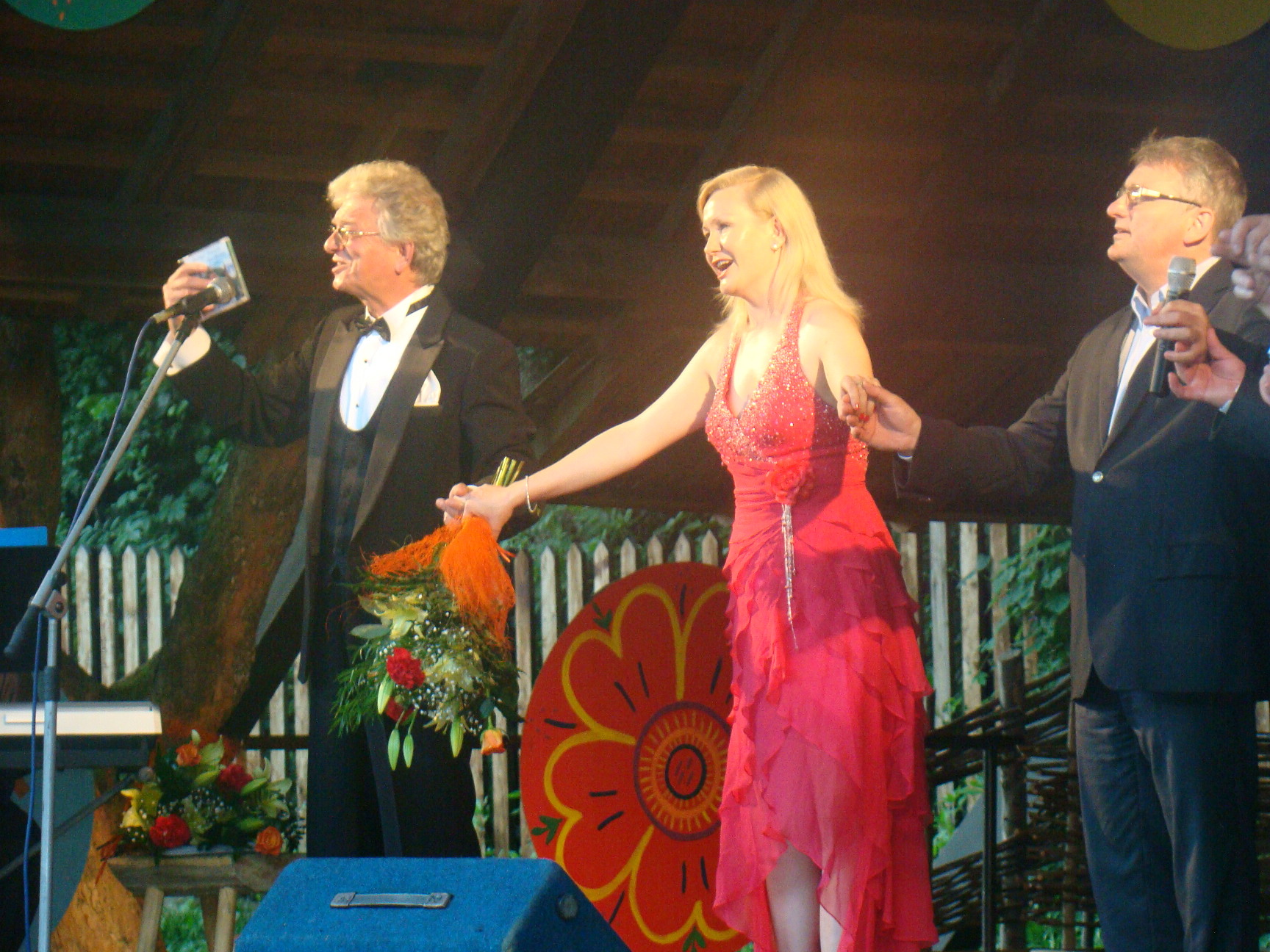
- Kowalski (left) in Sanok in 2009
- Born: 30 July 1951; Łódź, Poland
- Died: 1 August 2021 (aged 70)
- Occupations: Operatic bass; Opera manager; Television presenter
- Organizations: Grand Theatre, Łódź; Polish Chamber Opera; Polskie Radio Program I; Radio Łódź
- Awards: Cross of Merit (Poland); Medal for Merit to Culture – Gloria Artis

Kazimierz Kowalski (30 July 1951 – 1 August 2021) was a Polish operatic bass and opera manager at the Grand Theatre, Łódź, and a radio and television presenter. He founded an opera and operetta festival in the spa town Ciechocinek in 1998, and also the Polish Chamber Opera.

== Life and career ==
Born in Łódź, the son of theatrical actor Wiesław Wierusz-Kowalski, Kowalski studied voice at the Academy of Music with Antoni Majak, who was a singer and one of the founders of the Łódź Opera. Kowalski participated in the 1976 International Vocal Competition in Toulouse, achieving the highest (third) prize. The same year, he was engaged as a soloist at the Teatr Wielki (Grand Theatre) in Łódź, making his debut in the role of Kecal in Smetana's The Bartered Bride, and went on to perform leading roles.

From 1994 to 1997, he was the theatre's general and artistic director. During his era, he led a live worldwide television broadcast of Moniuszko's The Haunted Manor. The theatre was one of the few profitable theatrical institutions in Poland during his tenure. In 1998 a new theatre, the Summer Theatre, opened in the spa town Ciechocinek, where he initiated a festival of opera and operetta, managing it for more than 20 years. He also founded the Polish Chamber Opera.

Kowalski appeared on radio and television in shows such as Good evening, this is Lodz and Kazimierz Kowalski invites you. From 2000, he presented a series on Polish Radio about notable Polish artists. He ran a series on Radio Łódź titled Henryk Debich's Archive.

Kowalski managed the Grand Theatre again from 2005 to November 2008. The theatre's obituary noted:

Indefatigable in supporting young vocal talents, he always expressed great respect and empathy for his older colleagues, remembered them, benefited from their knowledge and experience, and did not let the opera audience forget about them. Always energetic, chatty, rushing to another meeting, concert or interview, he always found time for conversation.

Kowalski died on 1 August 2021, two days after his 70th birthday. He had planned to celebrate his career of 50 years in October 2021.

== Operatic roles ==
Operatic roles at the Grand Theatre included:

Opera	Composer	Role	Date
La bohème	Puccini	Alcindor	1977-04-02
Iolanta	Tchaikovsky	Bertrand	1978-03-19
Zorba	Kander	Niko	1979-02-24
Hrabina	Moniuszko	Chorąży	1979-12-08
Don Pasquale	Donizetti	Don Pasquale	1982-01-30
Lucia di Lammermoor	Donizetti	Raimondo	1983-11-19
Mefistofele	Boito	Mefistofele	1984-06-23
Così fan tutte	Mozart	Don Alfonso	1986-10-05
La Traviata	Verdi	Doktor Grenvil	1987-03-07
Tosca	Puccini	Cesare Angelotti	1988-02-20
Der Rosenkavalier	Richard Strauss	Notary	1989-03-18
Kynolog w rozterce	Henryk Czyż	Delegate	1989-12-02
Devils of Loudun	Penderecki	Rangier	1990-06-23
Don Giovanni	Mozart	Leporello; Komtur	1991-03-23
Carmen	Bizet	Zuniga	1991-09-14
Un ballo in maschera	Verdi	Tom	1993-03-20
Aida	Verdi	Pharao	1993-09-25
Ubu król	Penderecki	Giron; ciura	1993-11-09
Prince Igor	Borodin	Konczak	1994-10-22
Don Pasquale	Donizetti	Don Pasquale	1995-01-21
La bohème	Puccini	Colline	1995-02-11
Rigoletto	Verdi	Sparafucile; Ceprano	1995-04-22
The Magic Flute	Mozart	Sarastro	1995-12-16
