= Adalberto Álvarez =

Cuban pianist, director, and composer (1948–2021)

- Born: 22 November 1948; Camagüey, Cuba
- Died: 1 September 2021 (aged 72) Havana, Cuba
- Genre: Son
- Occupations: Composer, director
- Instrument: Piano
- Formerly of: Son 14; Adalberto Alvarez y su Son

Adalberto Cecilio Álvarez Zayas (22 November 1948 – 1 September 2021) was a Cuban pianist, arranger, conductor, and composer.

== Biography ==
Adalberto was born in La Havana on November 22, 1948, but considered himself a native of Camagüey, where he lived his early years. His birth in Havana had been "accidental", as his mother was visiting the capital and gave birth to him there. He began his musical career as a singer, but was admitted to the Escuela Nacional de Artes (National School of Arts) in Havana for bassoon study. He was enrolled there between 1966 and 1972, and also served as professor of Musical Literature at the Provincial School of Art of Camagüey during the 1970s. He founded the Cuban orchestra Son 14 in 1978, and later disbanded it in the 1980s. In 1984, Álvarez started the group Adalberto Alvarez y su Son, which he directed until his death from pneumonia in 2021, after contracting COVID-19. Both of these groups have been cited as incredibly influential to the Cuban music scene as a whole. He was one of the first people to publicly acknowledge his practice of Santería, an Afro-Cuban religion. The genre of his music is son, a style of music that originated in Cuba. He was also deputy to the National Assembly of People's Power between 2013 and 2018 and was elected from Camagüey municipality.

== Awards and honors ==
In 2008, he was awarded a National Music Award. He also received several distinctions which include Distinction for National Culture, Félix Varela Order, and the Cubadisco Award several times.

== Adalberto Álvarez y su Son ==
Adalberto Álvarez y su Son is a band founded in 1984 by Álvarez.
