= Stefano Mazzonis di Pralafera =

Italian opera director (1948–2021)

- Born: 24 June 1948; Rome, Italy
- Died: 7 February 2021 (aged 72); Liège, Belgium
- Occupation: Opera Director

Stefano Mazzonis di Pralafera (24 June 1948 – 7 February 2021) was an Italian opera director. He directed the Opéra Royal de Wallonie from 2007 to 2021.

== Biography ==
Born into Nobility in Rome, Mazzonis di Pralafera was a lawyer early in his career. He became director of the Teatro Communale di Bologna in 2004, and subsequently moved to Belgium to lead the Opéra Royal de Wallonie in 2007. He directed several pieces by Italian composers, such as Giuseppe Verdi, Giacomo Puccini, Gioachino Rossini, Gaetano Donizetti, and others.

Stefano Mazzonis di Pralafera died of cancer in Liège, Belgium on 7 February 2021 at the age of 72. His term as Director was set to expire on 31 July 2022.
