= Son 14 =

Son 14 is a fourteen-member son band from Santiago, Cuba, formed on November 11, 1978, by Adalberto Álvarez and Eduardo 'El Tiburon' Morales. In 1984, after having been the group's director for six years, Álvarez left Son 14 to start the orchestra Adalberto Álvarez y su Son in Havana.

== Partial discography ==
- A Bayamo En Coche (Areito, 1980)
- Son Como Son (Areito, 1981)
- Adalberto Alvarez presenta Son 14 (Areito, 1981)
- Damelo (Philips, 1983)
- Tumi Cuba Classics, Vol. 4: Son the Big Sound (Tumi, 1995)
- (with Tiburon) Cubania (Tumi, 1997)
