= Meor Yusof Aziddin =

Malaysian folk singer (1967–2021)

Meor Yusof Aziddin Meor Hassan (1967 – 24 December 2021), popularly known as Meor, was a Malaysian folk singer-songwriter in the Malay language.

== Life and career ==
He was born in Beruas, Perak in 1967. He performed from 1984 and had a major label recording release with Pesta Jiwa (2000), before deciding to take the independent route. He continued his craft as a busker in Kuala Lumpur, notably in Central Market. He was the most prolific local independent singer-songwriter with seven albums, and in a 2008 interview following his album Sakrat (songs based on poems by rising Malaysian poet Amirul Fakir), he stated that he planned to release one album a year. He relocated with his family to Ipoh, Perak, in 2006, where he also recorded, but often made trips back to Kuala Lumpur to perform. His critically acclaimed album Itu Padang...Aku Disitu (2003) is considered a classic in the non-mainstream music scene.

Meor died from COVID-19 on 24 December 2021, at age 54.

== Discography ==
- Dari Rakyat Untuk Rakyat (2009)
- Sakrat (2008)
- Yang Terlintas Di Fikiran (2006)
- Aku dan Bulan (2004)
- Itu Padang...Aku Disitu (2003)
- Pesta Jiwa II (2002)
- Pesta Jiwa (2000)

== Appearance ==
- Voices From Next Door compilation – various artists (Troubadours, 2006)
