= Buddhadeb Guha =

Bengali fiction writer (1935–2021)

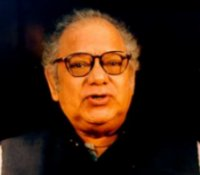
- Born: 29 June 1935; Calcutta, Bengal Presidency, British Raj
- Died: 29 August 2021 (aged 86); Kolkata, West Bengal, India
- Education: St. Xavier's College, University of Calcutta
- Occupations: Writer, chartered accountant
- Spouse: Ritu Guha ( Born : 24 March 1937 - Died : 24 December 2011 )
- Writing career
- Notable works: Madhukari, Sabinoy Nibedon, Chaprash

Buddhadeb Guha (29 June 1936 – 29 August 2021) was an Indian Bengali language fiction writer, singer and painter.

== Career ==
Born in Calcutta, Guha studied at St. Xavier's College of the University of Calcutta. He spent his early years in various districts of Eastern Bengal (now Bangladesh). Those days in Rangpur, Jaipurhat and Barisal are depicted in his Rivu series, some books from which are dedicated to friends from his youth.

Guha created Rijuda, an imaginary character who, with his sidekick Rudra, explores jungles mainly in Eastern India. He won the Ananda Puraskar in 1976 and was a chartered accountant by profession.

Apart from writing, Guha was trained to sing by Rabindra Sangeet at the Tagore school of music, Dakshinee. He learned Hindustani classical music and old-style Tappa songs from Ramkumar Chattopadhyay and Chandidas Mal. He was also a painter and toward the end of his life, when his eyesight began to fail and he dictated his writings, he fell back on this art.

== Bibliography ==
=== Novels ===
- Aainar Samne (Deys)
- Abhilas (Deys)
- Ababahika (Ananda Pub)
- Aborohi (Ananda Pub)
- Adbhut Lok (Sahityam)
- Alokjhari (Deys)
- Anwesh
- Babli (Sahityam, 1985)
- Baje Chandanpurer Korcha (Deys)
- Bangri Poshir Doo Rattir (Sahityam)
- Banjoytsnai, Sabuj Andhakare (Ananda Pub)
- Basona Kusum (Sahityam)
- Bati Ghar (Sahityam)
- Bhabar Somoi
- Bhorere Age (Ananda Pub)
- Binnyas (Ananda Pub)
- Boi Melate (Sahityam)
- Bonobasar (Deys)
- Bonobiharir Smriticharon (Rriti Prakashon)
- Chabutara
- Chandrayan (Sahityam)
- Changhar e Gaan (Deys)
- Chapras (Ananda Pub)
- Charkanya (Sahityam, 2004)
- Charumati (Sahityam, 2003)
- Chayara Dirgho Holo (Sahityam)
- Chou (Nirmal Sahityam)
- Doshti Uponyas (Ananda Pub)
- Doshti Uponyas (Sahityam)
- Kumudini
- Babli
- Jongli Mohol
- Ragmala
- Chandrayan
- Pakhsat
- Adbhut Lok
- Parijayee
- Basona Kusum
- Du-Nombor (Sahityam)
- Ektu Ushnatar Jonno (Ananda Pub)
- Gunja Phuler Mala (Deep Prakashon)
- Hajarduari (Ananda Pub)
- Halud Bosonto (Ananda Pub)
- Ilmorander Deshe
- Jagmogi (Sahityam)
- Jaoya-Asa (Deys, 1986)
- Jhaki Darshan
- Jolchobi, Anumotir Jonnye (Deys)
- Jongli Mohol (Sahityam)
- Jongoler Journal (Deys)
- Jongol Mahal (Deys)
- Jongol Sambhar (Deys)
- Jongol Mohol
- Bonobasar
- Jongoler Journal
- Paridhi
- Lobongir Jongole
- Jujudhan (Sahityam)
- Kangpokopi (Deys)
- Khelaghar
- Khela Jokhon (Ananda Pub)
- Koeler Kache (Ananda Pub)
- Kojagor (Deys)
- Kumudini (Sahityam)
- Lobongir Jongole (Deys)
- Madhukari (Ananda Pub)
- Mahulsukhar Chithi (Ananda Pub)
- Mandur Rupamoti (Sahityam)
- Mohorra
- Nagno Nirjan (Sahityam)
- Nana Galpa (Deep Prakashon, 2004)
- Oaikiki (Ananda Pub)
- Pakhshat (Sahityam)
- Palashtalir Parshi (Deys, 1985–86)
- Pamori (Sahityam)
- Pancham Prabas
- Panchasti Priyo Golpo (Sahityam)
- Panchoprodip
- Parijat Paring (Ananda Pub)
- Paridhi (Deys)
- Poheli Peyar
- Premer Golpo
- Priyo Galpo (Sahityam)
- Prothom Probas
- Prothomader Jonnye
- Pujor Somoi e (Ananda Pub)
- Ragmala (Sahityam)
- Reunion (Ananda Pub)
- Riya (Deys, 1990)
- Sajhghore, Eka
- Saldungri
- Sanjhbelate (Dey's, 2002)
- Sareng Miya (Deys)
- Sasandiri (Ananda Pub)
- Sabinay Nibedan (Ananda Pub, 1989)
- Samo (Sahityam)
- Sharaswata (Sahityam)
- Sera baro (Bikash, 1999)
- Sogotokti
- Sondheyr Pore (Ananda Pub)
- Sopord (Deys)
- Srestha Golpo
- Sukher Kache
- Ek gharer dui raat

=== Rivu ===
- Durer Bhor
- Durer Dupur (Deys)
- Najai
- Parnomochi
- Parijayii (Sahityam, 2000)
- Rivu (Deys, 1992)
- Rivur Sraban (Ananda Pub)
- Rivu [1-4] (Deys)

=== Rijuda ===
- Albino (Ananda Pub)
- Aro Dui Rijuda (Sahityam)
- Aro Dui Notun Rijuda Kahini (Sahityam)
- Saptam Ripu
- Teen Nombor
- Aro Tin Rijuda Kahini (Sahityam)
- Bagher Mangsho Ebong Onnyo Shikar (Ananda Pub)
- Bonobibir Bon e (Ananda Pub)
- Duti Rijuda Kahini (Sahityam, 2004)
- Gugunogumbarer Deshe (Ananda Pub)
- Langra Pahan (Ananda Pub)
- Moulir Raat (Ananda Pub)
- Ninikumari r Bagh (Ananda Pub)
- Rijuda Kahini (Sahityam)
- Kuruboker Deshe
- Projati Projapoti
- Jomduar
- Rijuda Samagra [1-5] (Ananda Pub, 1993)
- Rijudar Char Kahini (Sahityam, 2002)
- Rijudar Songe Jongole (Ananda Pub)
- Rijudar Songe Boxer Jongole Ebong (Ananda Pub)
- Rijudar Songe Lobongi Bone (Ananda Pub)
- Rijudar Songe Sodorbone o Anyanyo Golpo (Sahityam)
- Rijudar Songe Sufkor e (Ananda Pub)
- Ru Aha (Ananda Pub)
- Taar Baghoa (Ananda Pub)
- Tin Rijuda (Sahityam)
- Tin Rijuda (Sahityam)

== Death ==
Buddhadeb Guha died on 29 August 2021 after developing post-COVID-19 health complications.
