= Rabah Driassa =

Algerian painter and singer (1934–2021)

Rabah Driassa رابح درياسة
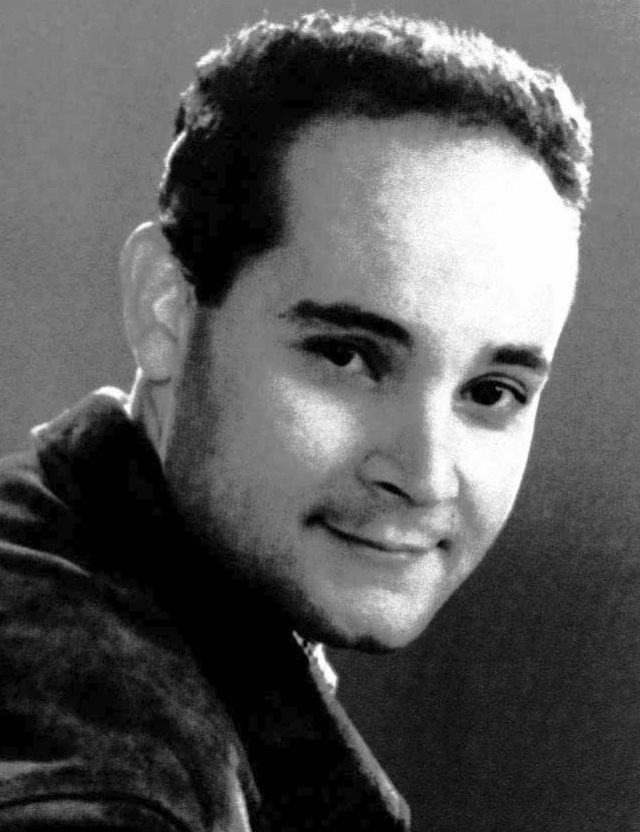

Background information
- Birth name: Rabah Driassa
- Born: 19 August 1934
- Origin: Blida, Algeria
- Died: 8 October 2021 (aged 87)
- Genres: Folk
- Occupation(s): Singer, musician
- Instrument: Vocals
- Years active: 1953–1990
- Labels: Tlemcen music

Rabah Driassa (19 August 1934 – 8 October 2021) was an Algerian painter and singer interpreting folk music. He was mostly active between the 1950s through 1980s where a number of his songs ("Hizia", "Nejma Qotbia", "El Goumri") became national hits in Algeria.

== Biography ==
Drissa was born in 1934 in Blida. He lost his mother at the age of 12, and his father at 15. Being an orphan with five brothers to help, he started his career by sculpting on glass and working on miniatures. His introduction to the music world happened in 1953, when the radio broadcasting at Khaldoun in Algiers proposed him to sing his own musical composition.

== Discography ==
Rabah Driassa has a rich discography compiled over the years through his career. Among his most famous hits:

- "Ya Lhouta"
- "Ya Tayr Lwarchane"
- "Ya Tafaha"
- "Al Momarida£"
- "Ya Zayr Lemqam"
- "Hizia"
- "Nejma Qotbia"
- "El Goumri"
