= Sebastião Tapajós =

Brazilian guitarist and composer (1943–2021)

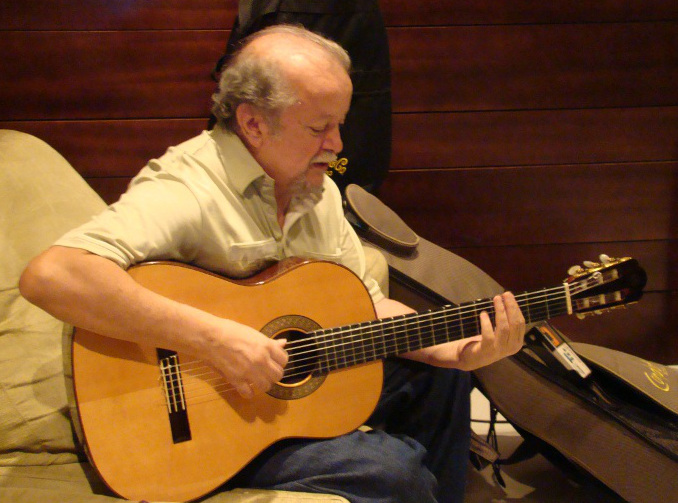
Sebastião Tapajós

Sebastião Tapajós (April 16, 1943 – October 2, 2021) was a Brazilian guitarist and composer from Santarém (Pará). He began learning guitar from his father when he was nine years old, and later studied at the Conservatório de Lisboa and at the Instituto de Cultura Hispânica de Madrid. In 1998 he composed the soundtrack for the local Pará film "Lendas Amazônicas". In the 2000s, Tapajós performed in Europe. He recorded more than 50 albums in his career.

== Discography ==
- 1963 Apresentando Sebastião Tapajós e Seu Conjunto
- 1968 O Violão e...Tapajós
- 1972 Sebastiao Tapajos + Pedro dos Santos
- 1976 Guitarra Fantástica
- 1979 Violão & Amigos
- 1982 Guitarra Criolla
- 1982 Zimbo Convida Sebastião Tapajós
- 1984 Maurício Einhorn & Sebastião Tapajós
- 1986 Visões Do Nordeste
- 1986 Painel
- 1987 Villa-Lobos
- 1988 Lado a Lado - Sebastião Tapajós and Gilson Peranzzetta
- 1989 Terra Brasis
- 1989 Brasilidade - Sebastião Tapajós and João Cortez
- 1990 Reflections - Sebastião Tapajós and Gilson Peranzzetta
- 1993 Instrumental No Ccbb - Sebastião Tapajós, Gilson Peranzzetta, Maurício Einhorn and Paulinho Nogueira
- 1997 Amazônia Brasileira - Sebastião Tapajós and Nilson Chaves
- 1997 Ontem e Sempre
- 1997 Afinidades - Sebastião Tapajós and Gilson Peranzzetta
- 1998 Da Minha Terra - Sebastião Tapajós and Jane Duboc
- 2001 Acorde Violão
