= Tatyana Chudova =

Russian composer (1944–2021)

Tatyana Alexeyevna Chudova (Russian: Татья́на Алексе́евна Чу́дова; 16 June 1944 – 23 November 2021) was a Russian composer.

== Life and career ==
She was born in Moscow and studied at the Central Music School in Moscow and then at the Moscow Conservatory. After completing her studies, she took a teaching position at the Conservatory. On 21 June 2007, she was awarded the title of Honored Master of Arts of the Russian Federation.

== Works ==
Selected works include:

- Symphony Ab. 1, 'Timur and his team'
- O myorvoy tsaverne i semi bojatiryakh, opera, 1966-7
- Na derevnyu dedushke, opera, 1978
- Bible Suite for organ
- Last lullaby with oboe solo
- Three Circles for solo cello
- Trombone sonata
- From Russian Fairytales Suite for orchestra
- Concerto for piano and orchestra No.1
- Concerto for piano and orchestra No.2
- Concerto for Orchestra
- Violin sonata
- Suite for organ
- The Warriors Cantata
- Cantata about Moscow
- The Architects for chorus and orchestra
- Concert Toccata for piano
- Symphony No.1
- Symphony No.2
- Symphony No.3

Her music has been recorded and issued on CD, including:

- Organ Music by Moscow Composers - Pedagogues of Moscow Conservatory - From the Sources to the Present - Anthology Vol. 1
