= Naïma Ababsa =

Algerian singer (1963–2021)

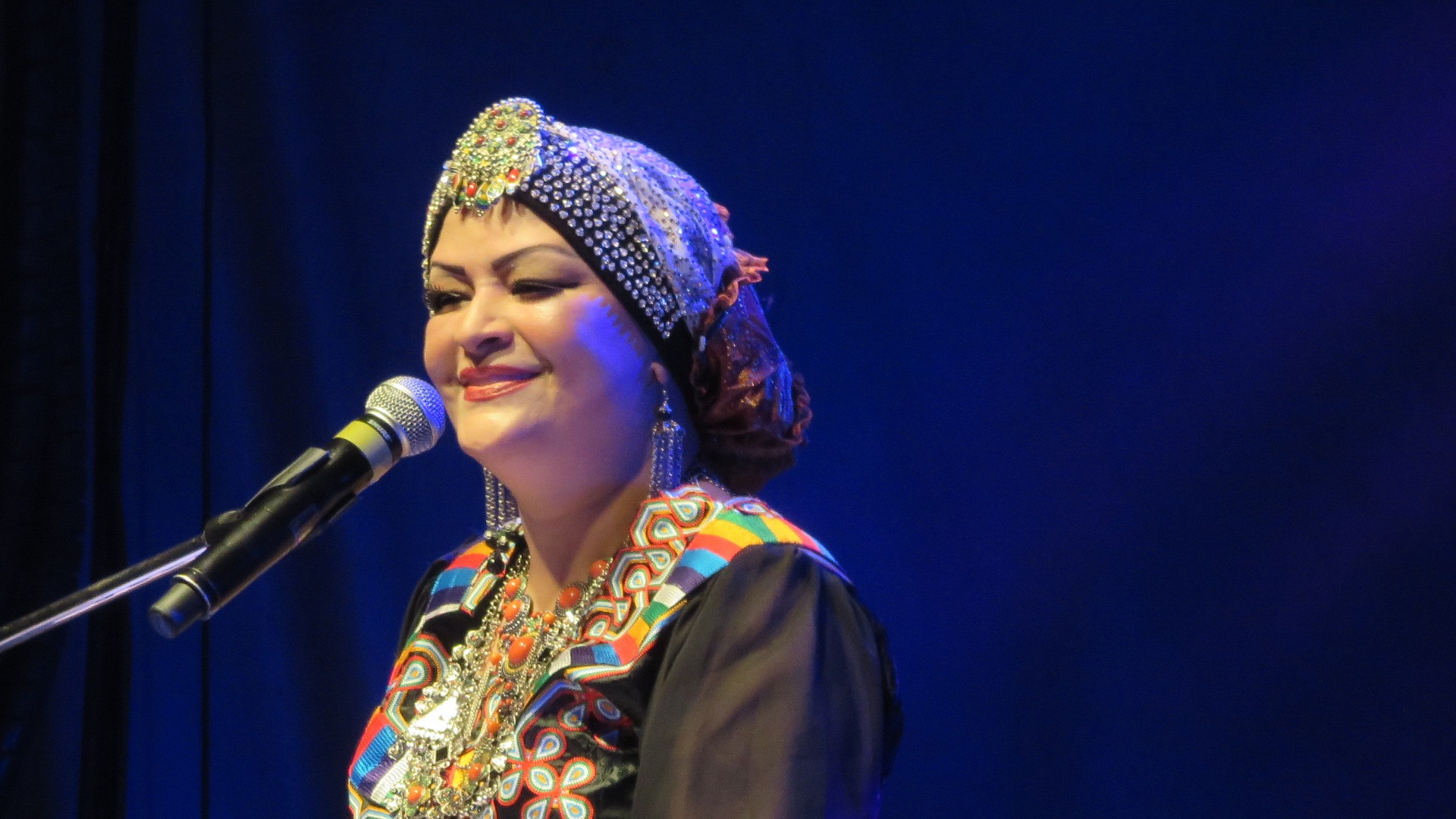
- Ababsa in 2018
- Born: 1963; Tlemcen, Algeria
- Died: April 18, 2021 (aged 57–58); Algiers, Algeria
- Occupation: Singer

Naïma Ababsa (Arabic: نعيمة عبابسة) (1963 – 18 April 2021) was an Algerian singer.

== Biography ==
Ababsa was the daughter of the composer Abdelhamid Ababsa. Her sister, Fella El Djazairia, is also a singer. She performed a great range of musical material and genres, such as Chaoui, Algérois, Hawzi, and other styles from North Africa. She paid tribute to Lounès Matoub in 2000 onstage in Paris. She also paid homage to the singer Seloua at the Théâtre national algérien Mahieddine-Bachtarzi in Algiers in 2008. In 2018, she was invited to the Festival international de musique de Timgad. That same year, she participated in the 8th annual Festival Orientalys in Montreal.

Naïma Ababsa died in Algiers on 18 April 2021, at the age of 58.

== Albums ==
- Ya khti (2010)
- La Star Du Chaoui (2017)
