= Chandidas Mal =

Indian musician (1929–2021)

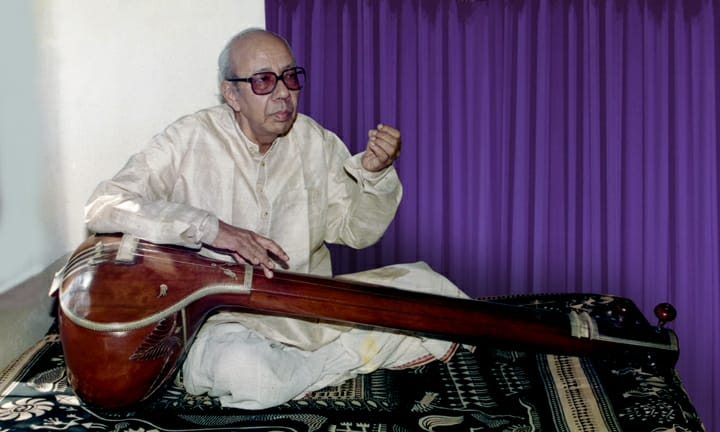
Chandidas Mal

Chandidas Mal (7 October 1929 – 8 December 2021) was an Indian musician perhaps best known for his rendition of Puratani Bangla Gaan (Bengali Sons of Olden times), Tappa, Shyamasangeet (Devotional Songs for Goddess Kali) and Agamani (Devotional Songs for Goddess Durga).

== Biography ==
Mal was born in Bally, British India. He was the eldest among four children of Narayan Chandra Mal and Ushangini Mal. He started his music lessons at the age of 3 from his father, at the age of 6 his musical talent was recognized when he got 1st Prize in a conference at All Bengal Music Association. He took his music lessons from a number of eminent musicians namely Kishori Mohan Sinha (Khyal), Ramchandra Guha (Khyal, Thumri), Krishna Chandra Dey (Drupad, Dhamar), Gyan Prakash Ghosh (Bhajan), Shailaja Ranjan Majumdar (Rabindasangeet), Durga Sen (Geet, Ghazal), and legendary Tappa singer Kalipada Pathak.

He had been a regular in All India Radio since 1944. He was a regular in Doordarshan and other TV channels as well. His records were released by His Master's Voice. as well as other music companies. He also did playback singing in some movies. He has also performed at various concerts.

He has been associated with many institutions including Rabindra Bharati University, Visva Bharati University, Bengal Music College, etc. He had been instrumental in promoting Tappa and Puratani in post graduate syllabus. His style of singing (Gayaki) was very original. West Bengal State Sangeet Academy recorded 100 Tappa & Puratani Bengali songs in his voice for their archives in order to restore the golden glimpses of his original style and keep the originality of Tappa & Puratani Bengali songs and make them public. West Bengal State Academy of Dance Drama Music and Visual Arts felicitated with Academy award for his outstanding contribution. He also received "Vibhakar" award from Bangiya Sangeet Parishad.

His notable disciples include Ajoy Chakrabarty (Hindustani classical vocalist), Dr. Utpala Goswami (Ex-Dean Rabindra Bharati University), Buddhadeb Guha (author), Debasri Mitra (US based singer), etc.

Mal was married to Namita, the sister of sculptor Sarbari Roy Chowdhury, and had a son, Debajyoti.

He died on 8 December 2021, at the age of 92 in his home in Bally. He was survived by his wife Namita, Son Debajyoti, Daughter-in-Law Vandana and Granddaughter Aaryaka.
