= Paul Koulak =

French composer (1943–2021)

- Born: Paul Koulaksezian; 27 March 1943; Saint-Chamond, Loire, France
- Died: 28 June 2021 (aged 78); Paris, France
- Occupations: Composer, musician
- Website: www.paulkoulak.com

Paul Koulak (birth name: Paul Koulaksezian; Armenian: Կուլակսեզյան, romanized: Kulaksezian; 27 March 1943 – 28 June 2021) was a French composer of Armenian origin.

== Biography ==
Koulak was born in Saint-Chamond.

Two of his three brothers are also in the artistic field, one being also a musician, the other, Pierre Koulak, an actor.

He studied music at the École Normale de Musique de Paris and the Conservatoire de Paris. He has composed many pieces of music for television: broadcasts of game shows and in particular the most famous, those of the credits of Fort Boyard (a program for which he composed nearly 200 pieces) in its first version from 1990 and credits for cartoons.

In 1971, Koulak composed the music for the song "Souviens-toi de moi" for the singer Marie and in 1973 "Sans toi" which was performed by Martine Clémenceau for the Eurovision Song Contest 1973.

In 1989 Koulak composed Canal+ sports advertising and also Météo, the weather forecast on Antenne 2, during this period.

All his compositions are played on synthesizers.

== Discography ==
TV series

- 1985: Clémentine
- 1989: Operation Mozarts
- 1990–2013: Fort Boyard (soundtrack)
- 1992: La Piste de Xapatan
- 1992: Le Vol du Kangourou
- 1992: Civilisation in Danger
- 1998: Tom-Tom and Nana
- 1999: La Belle Lisse Poire du Prince de Motordu
