= Trisutji Kamal =

Indonesian composer (1936–2021)

Trisutji Djuliati Kamal (28 November 1936 – 21 March 2021) was an Indonesian composer. She was born in Jakarta and grew up in the Sultanate of Langkat in Binjai, Sumatra. She studied piano and composition with Henk Badings at the Amsterdam Conservatory, and continued her studies at the Ecole Normale de Musique in Paris and the Santa Cecilia Conservatory in Rome. After completing her studies, Kamal returned to Indonesia in 1967 and began working as a musician and composer. In 1994 she founded the Trisutji Kamal Ensemble, which performs with two pianos, Indonesian traditional vocals, instrument and dance. She died aged 84.

== Works ==
Kamal's compositions include orchestral, chamber, choral, solo piano, opera, ballet, and film music. Her works often incorporate elements of gamelan music and Islamic culture and combine traditional Indonesian and Western instruments. Selected compositions include:

- From the Spaces of Life, 1969
- Gunung Agung (Mount Agung, 1963–1970) ballet suite
- Menara Mesjid Nabawi (The Minaret of the Nabawi Mosque)
- Biarkan musim berganti film soundtrack, 1971
- Prayer of Redemption for orchestra, 2004

Her works for piano solo have been recorded and released on multiple CDs by Indonesian pianist and composer Ananda Sukarlan.
