= Rainbow Ffolly =

UK musical group

- Origin: High Wycombe, England
- Genres: Psychedelic pop; psychedelic rock; art rock
- Years active: 1963–1969
- Past members: Jonathan Dunsterville; Richard Dunsterville; Roger Newell; Stewart Osborn

Rainbow Ffolly were an English psychedelic pop band from High Wycombe, England. They released an album, Sallies Fforth, in 1968. Their only single from 1968, the chugging "Drive My Car" (not the Lennon–McCartney song), failed to garner success on the charts, and they disbanded shortly thereafter. They were signed to EMI's subsidiary Parlophone (which also held The Beatles' contract at that time) during their brief career. The band re-united in 2015 to record a follow-up album, Rainbow Ffolly – FFollow Up!.

Jonathan (John) Dunsterville and his brother Richard Dunsterville of Farnham Common were inclined toward music and performing at an early age, and during the early 1960s, formed a band called the Force Four, specialising in Everly Brothers-style harmony material. John was at college when he met Stewart Osborn, a drummer, who, in turn, knew a bassist named Roger Newell. Out of this a new group, the Rainbow Ffolly, was formed. All four members sang, with Jon Dunsterville serving as songwriter. By early 1967, they acquired a manager, John Sparrowhawk, and tried for a recording contract. They booked time at the Jackson Recording Studio, owned by Malcolm and John Jackson, the sons of disc jockey Jack Jackson, and put a demo tape together.

They were persuaded by the Jackson brothers to come up with seven more songs, all ostensibly for a full-length demo reel. The Jackson brothers took the tape to EMI, which asked for the rights to the tape exactly as delivered. Jon Dunsterville and his wife Jane came up with the cover art for Sallies Fforth.

The group played concerts in support of the record, including a tour of Germany, making their first overseas appearance at the Star Club in Hamburg in a month-long engagement. The Rainbow Ffolly also performed at the Playboy Club in London, which was then a new recreational institution and always attracted a lot of attention.

The album became a Record of the Week on the BBC's Saturday Club. Those high visibility gigs generated press, but not enough sales to make the album a success or chart their singles. They weren't earning enough money from live performances to survive on. The quartet all decided to get regular jobs and give up on music by the end of 1968.

In 1998, See for Miles Records re-released Sallies Fforth as a CD with one bonus track, B-side to their single, "Drive My Car", "Go Girl."

Roger Newell (born 1948), who later joined Rick Wakeman's band, died Friday, 10 September 2021.

== Track listing on Sallies Fforth ==
1. "She's Alright" – 3:35
2. "I'm So Happy" – 2:44
3. "Montgolfier" – 2:35
4. "Drive My Car" – 2:15
5. "Goodbye" – 3:42
6. "Hey You" – 2:20
7. "Sun Sing" – 4:00
8. "Sun & Sand" – 3:32
9. "Labour Exchange" – 2:26
10. "They'm" – 1:55
11. "No" – 3:11
12. "Sighing Game" – 2:49
13. "Come on Go" – 3:02

== Track Listing on Ffollow Up ==
1. "Single Cell Amoeba"
2. "Postcard"
3. "My Love has Gone"
4. "Cars"
5. "Sky Angels"
6. "Noah"
7. "Slow Down Zone"
8. "Countdown"
9. "Shoes"
10. "Is it Over"
11. "Tour de FForce"
12. "Bathers of the Lost Ark"
