= Lucien Gourong =

French writer and singer (1943–2021)

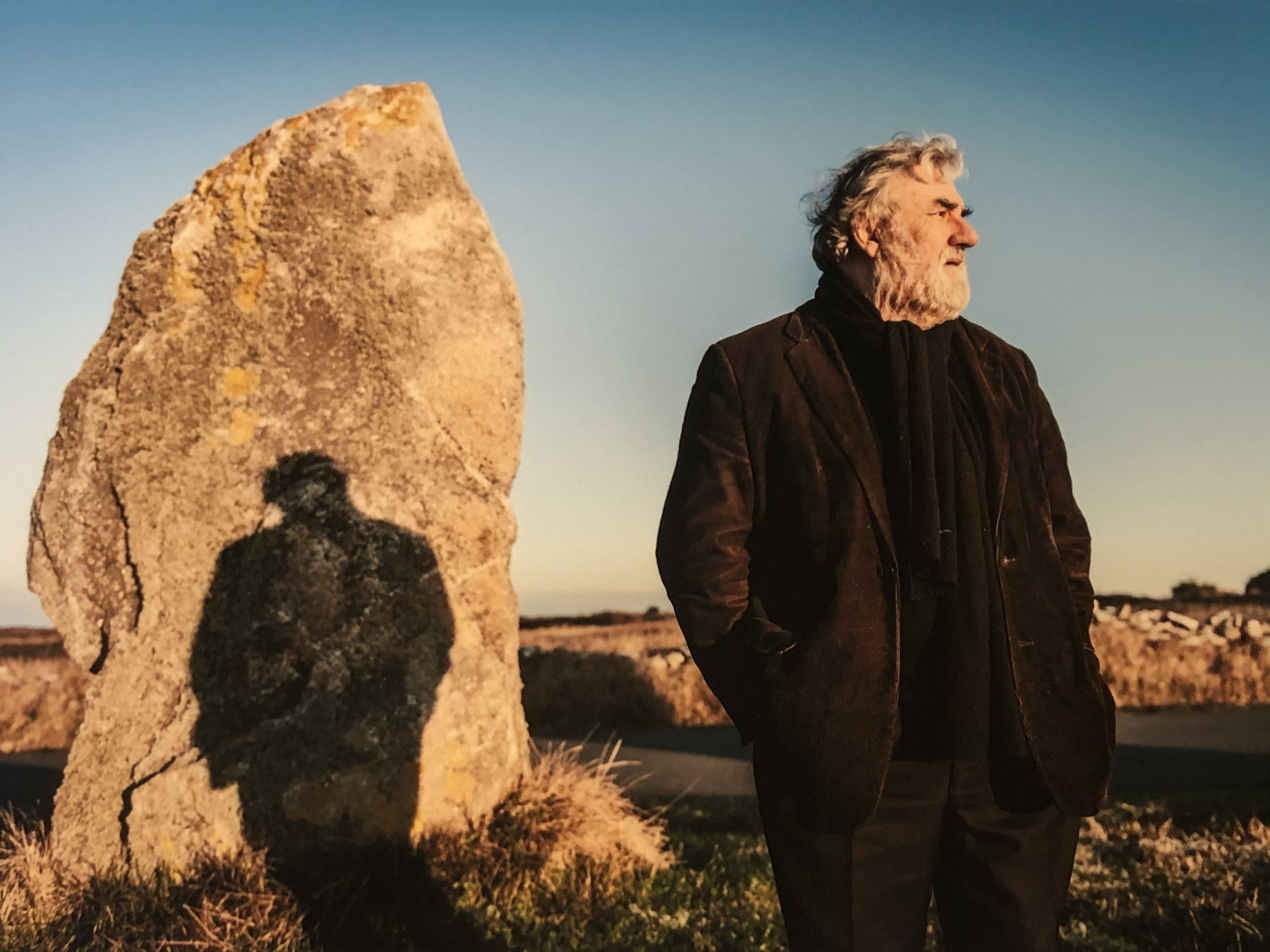
- Born: 11 October 1943; Groix, France
- Died: 15 February 2021 (aged 77); Lorient, France
- Occupations: Writer; Singer; Storyteller

Lucien Gourong (11 October 1943 – 15 February 2021) was a French writer, singer, and storyteller.

== Biography ==
After he earned a degree in history from the University of Nantes, Gourong owned a cabaret in Lorient for ten years, where he programmed over 500 shows. He spent more than 40 years as a storyteller, travelling across France and the Francophone world. His stories included Écoute voir comme ça sent bon, La Mer à boire, Les aventures du Capitaine Morvan, and L'aïeule ! Oh que la guerre est moche. He founded a storytelling festival, which took place in Chevilly-Larue. He participated in the Étonnants voyageurs festival in Saint-Malo. He also worked for Bretagne Magazine, where he wrote about Breton cuisine.

Also a singer, Gourong knew of a vast repertoire of songs originating from the Pays de Lorient. His father gifted him dozens of notebooks written by a Breton sailor, which were translated into French by Gourong.

Lucien Gourong died from COVID-19, on 15 February 2021, during the COVID-19 pandemic in France. He was 77.

== Bibliography ==
- Grande et petites histoires de l’île (1997)
- Contes de la rade de Lorient et des Coureaux de Groix (1998)
- Contes de Quiberon et des alentours (1999)
- L'Aïeule (1999)
- Contes des îles de Bretagne (1999)
- Tout conte fait (2002)
- Les Aventures du capitaine Morvan (2002)
- Le Grand Géant Grands Sourcils, Blanc Silex Editions (2002)
- Drôles de Marines! (2004)
- Saveurs de Bretagne (2005)
- Carnet gourmand de Bretagne (2007)
- Confidences d'un homard (2008)
- A table ! (2019)

== Discography ==
- Faut faire avec (1976)
- Kloz En Douët - L'Île De Groix & La Mer - Histoires & Chansons (1977)
- Venez avec moi au bistrot (1979)
- Les temps changent (1981)
- Les veillées mortuaires (1982)
- Le Yank Tsé Kiang (1983)
- De long en large (1992)
- Le Vieil Océan (1992)
- De l’Orient à Lorient (1992)
- La destinée souriante des loups de mer manqués (1999)
- Les Sept Vies (2001)
- Le Best of (2005)
- Le best-of - 2 (2005)
