= Paolo Giordano (guitarist) =

Italian guitarist (1962–2021)

- Born: 5 July 1962; Pescara, Italy
- Died: 29 December 2021 (aged 59); Pescara, Italy
- Occupation: Guitarist

Paolo Giordano (5 July 1962 – 29 December 2021) was an Italian guitarist.

== Biography ==
Giordano was a pioneer of advanced percussive techniques on the acoustic guitar in Italy.

He died from COVID-19 in Pescara on 29 December 2021, at the age of 59.

== Discography ==
- Paolo Giordano (1994)
- Kid in a toyshop (2000)
- Have You Seen the Roses? (2008)
