= Dorine Mokha =

Congolese dancer (1989–2021)

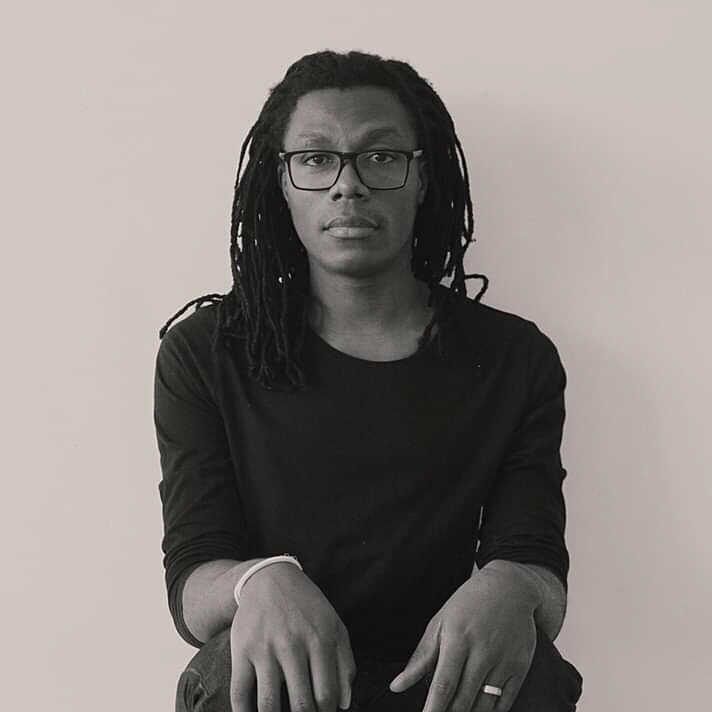
- Born: November 1989; Lubumbashi, Zaire
- Died: 8 January 2021 (aged 31); Lubumbashi, Democratic Republic of the Congo
- Occupation: Dancer

Dorine Mokha (November 1989 – 8 January 2021) was a Congolese dancer. He was considered to be one of the greatest Congolese contemporary choreographers.

== Biography ==
After earning a degree in literature studies from the Collège Saint François de Sales Imara in Lubumbashi, Mokha moved to Kisangani in 2009 and studied dance. He participated in the Danse l'Afrique Danse festival of the Institut Français in Ouagadougou and at the Studio Residencies of the foundation Pro Helvetia in Switzerland.

Mokha graduated from the University of Kisangani in 2013 with a master's degree in economic and social law with a thesis titled "Problématique de la protection de la propriété intellectuelle face aux NTIC en RDC, cas des œuvres musicales". In 2018, he received the Prix Lokumu, which honors distinguished Congolese artists. He dedicated the award "to all the Congolese dancers who fight every day to make a living from and with their dances and whose efforts deserve to be saluted. To all those people who believe in me since my difficult beginnings, to all those who support the artist that I am by respecting the choices of the person that I am".

As a dancer and choreographer, Mokha performed several shows in the Democratic Republic of the Congo as well as internationally, such as the Berlin Biennale on 24 January 2020 with the performance "Entre deux...". He also performed the piece at the Thyssen-Bornemisza Museum in Madrid. That year, he received an award from the Young African Leaders Initiative, founded by Barack Obama, in recognition of his work against homophobia. An activist for LGBT rights, he released a four part film denouncing homophobic discrimination in the DRC based on his personal experiences with the issues.

Dorine Mokha died suddenly of malaria on January 8, 2021, in Lubumbashi at the age of 31.
