= Shantiraj Khosla =

Indian music composer (1966–2021)

- ଶାନ୍ତିରାଜ ଖୋସଲା
- Born: 7 October 1966; Jeypore, Odisha
- Died: 27 May 2021 (aged 54); Cuttack
- Known for: Odia music director and singer
- Spouse: Sagarika Khosla
- Children: Shruti Prasarini
- Parents: Martin Khosla (father); Sabitri Khosla (mother)
- Awards: Odisha State Film Awards, 2018

Shantiraj Khosla (7 October 1966 – 27 May 2021) was an Indian music composer and singer who mainly worked in the Odia film and music industry.

== Early life ==
Shantiraj was born on 7 October 1966, in Jeypore, Odisha, India. He was a student of Vikram Dev College, Jeypore.

== Career ==
Khosla was a guitarist and mandolin player. He started his musical career with Akashvani Jaipur. Later he came to Cuttack and learned Hindustani classical music. After that, he started composing some Odia music albums, bhajans. In 2002, he started composing Odia film songs. His first Odia film was Wrong Number. He has worked in more than 20 movies and around 2,000 Odia album songs.

In 2019, he won the Odisha State Film Awards-2018 for Odia film Pheria.

=== Composer ===
- 2014: Jai Hind
- 2012: ACP Ranveer
- 2011: Baishi Pahache Kheliba Mina
- 2010: Tora More Jodi Sundara
- 2010: Aakhi Palakare Tu
- 2010: Don
- 2009: Keun Dunia Ru Asila Bandhu
- 2008: Mate Ani Dela Lakhye Faguna
- 2008: Mu Sapanara Soudagar
- 2008: Dhanare Rakhibu Sapatha Mora
- 2007: Bandhu (Odia part)
- 2007: To Bina Mo Kahani Addha
- 2002: Wrong Number

== Death ==
Khosla died from COVID-19 related issues at SCB Medical college and Hospital, Cuttack on 27 May 2021, during its pandemic in India. He tested COVID positive on 19 May and was in home isolation when was rushed to SCB Medical after he developed health complications on 22 May.
