= Thanwa Raseetanu =

Musical artist (1970–2021)

- ธันวา ราศีธนู
- Born: 19 December 1970; Si Bun Rueang District, Nongbua Lamphu Province, Thailand
- Died: 7 September 2021 (aged 50); Camillian Hospital, Bangkok, Thailand
- Occupations: Singer; Musician
- Musical career
- Genres: Luk thung; Phleng phuea chiwit; Rock; heavy metal
- Years active: 1999–2021
- Label: R-Siam (RS Group)

Thanwa Raseetanu (Thai: ธันวา ราศีธนู; 19 December 1970 – 7 September 2021), was a Thai Luk thung and Phleng phuea chiwit singer from the Isan area who recorded on the RS Group label. His popular songs include Blind Hen ("Kai Ta Fang", ไก่ตาฟาง), The rhinoceros ("Sib Et Ror Dor", 11 ร.ด.), The gold chameleon ("King Ga Thong", กิ้งก่าทอง), etc.

== Early life and music career ==
Raseetanu was born in Si Bun Rueang District, Nongbua Lamphu Province. He had two siblings, and was the youngest son. He was educated up until primary 6. His mother died from cancer, so he worked a job for two years. His father had a new wife, so he and his siblings moved to Phetchabun Province. However, he did not get along with his father's new wife, so he eventually moved to Bangkok to pursue his career.

He worked without job selection, until he saw his friend who was a musician, so they founded Tantawan band. In 1999, Tantawan band was disbanded but he continued to make music by himself.

In 2001, he recorded first studio album, "Pae Rasi" (แผ่ราศี). In 2002, his second studio album "Nuk Soo Khong Mae" (นักสู้ของแม่) was released. In 2004, his third album "Wan Thee Chun Roe" (วันที่ฉันรอ) was released. He gained popularity and fame from his song Blind Hen ("Kai Ta Fang", ไก่ตาฟาง) in 2006. His music began to be played in Southern Thailand, on Luk thung Mahanakhorn's Radio Station. His music also became popular on a national level.

In 2009, he signed with Thai record label Rsiam (subsidiary of RS Group). His popular songs from Rsiam include The rhinoceros ("Sib Et Ror Dor", 11 ร.ด.), The gold chameleon ("King Ga Thong", กิ้งก่าทอง), The old frog ("Kob Thao", กบเฒ่า), The buffalo ("Kway", ควาย), "The stupid ass", ("Lar Ngo", ลาโง่) etc.

== Illness and death ==
Thanwa tested positive for COVID-19 in August 2021 and was hospitalized that same day. On 7 September 2021, Thanwa was confirmed dead due to complications from COVID-19, becoming one of several Thai celebrities who have died from COVID-19 during the COVID-19 pandemic in Thailand.

== Discography ==
=== Rsiam ===
- 2009 : The gold chameleon
- 2011 : The old frog
- 2011 : The heart thief
- 2013 : Anger or Satan?
