= Chuck Alaimo Quartet =

American rock band

The Chuck Alaimo Quartet was an American rock music group from Rochester, New York, who achieved some popularity in the 1950s. They were originally signed as one of the first artists on the new Ken Records label. When their recording of "Leap Frog" for Ken garnered industry notice, the recording was acquired by MGM Records, who subsequently signed the group and released further singles. "Leap Frog" was a saxophone-led instrumental which charted on Billboard Hot 100 for a single week in April 1957, at position #92. This recording was listed as tenth most popular in Milwaukee in July of that year. Members of the group included Chuck Alaimo on sax, Bill Irvine on piano, Pat Magnolia on bass, and Tommy Rossi on drums. Billboard noted they "(made) enough noise for a group twice their size" and "moves with a good beat and sound" but noted weakness when covering others' songs. Although each member played an instrument, the outfit was not strictly an instrumental group.

Chuck Alaimo died in November 1978 at the age of 48.

Bill Irvine (born William G. Irvine on February 22, 1934, in Rochester) died on March 16, 2021, at age 87.

== Discography ==
Year	Title	B-side	Label/Catalog #	Billboard Top 100 Chart	Notes
1957	"Leap Frog"	"Blueberry Hill"	Ken 6753	-	
1957	"Leap Frog"	"That's My Desire"	MGM 12449	92	
1957	"How I Love You"	"Local 66"	MGM 12508	-	
1957	"Lovers Again"	"Where's My Baby"	MGM 12589	-	
1958	"Rockin' in G"	-	MGM 12636	-	
