= Lionel Leroy =

French singer (1956–2021)

- Born: Yves Martin; 15 February 1956
- Died: 20 June 2021 (aged 65)
- Occupation: Singer

Lionel Leroy, the stage name of Yves Martin (15 February 1956 – 20 June 2021) was a French singer.

== Biography ==
Leroy primarily performed for the credits of television series from the late 1970s to the early 1980s. In 2006, he married the singer Sheila. They separated in 2016.

Lionel Leroy died on 20 June 2021 at the age of 65.

== Filmography ==
=== Television ===
- Wonder Woman (1975)
- Starsky & Hutch (1978)
- Barrières (1980)
- Hart to Hart (1982)
- Mr. Merlin (1983)

=== Animated series ===
- Grendizer (1978)
- Ulysses 31 (1981)
- Tofffsy et l'Herbe musicale (1982)
- Arthur! and the Square Knights of the Round Table (1982, 1985)
- Danger Mouse (1982)
- Gil et Julie (1983)
- X-Bomber (1983)
- The Secret of the Selenites (1984)

== Discography ==
- Hey Joker (1981)
- Le vampire amoureux (1981)
- Allez Louise ! (1982)
- Femme musique, Perfide Albion (1982)
- Blanc ou noir (1984)
- Cité de malheur (1984)
- Patatras (1984)
- Comme dit Lionel Richie (1985)
- Complètement fou (1989)
