= El Noba =

Argentine singer (1997–2022)

- Born: Lautaro René Coronel; 15 January 1997; Florencio Varela, Argentina
- Origin: Argentina
- Died: 3 June 2022 (aged 25) Florencio Varela, Argentina
- Genres: Cumbia
- Occupations: Singer, songwriter
- Instruments: Voice
- Years active: 2021–2022
- Labels: Kriterio Music

Lautaro René Coronel (15 January 1997 – 3 June 2022) known as El Noba, was an Argentine singer of cumbia. In 2021, he rose to fame after releasing "Tamo chelo", making his debut on the Billboard Argentina Hot 100 list.

== Biography ==
Coronel was born on 15 January 1997 in Florencio Varela. In his adolescence he worked as a bricklayer, like his father. He also worked as a food delivery man, but due to improper use in the quarantine of the COVID-19 pandemic, the Police of Buenos Aires confiscated his motorcycle with which he worked. It was then that he began to venture into Instagram, where his followers sent him questions asking for advice for him to answer.

== Career ==
In 2021 Coronel released his first song, "Tamo chelo", with which he quickly rose to fame, being all the rage on social networks and even debuting on the Argentina Hot 100 list of Billboard.

In December of that same year he also collaborated with Perro Primo and R Jota on the single "Yendo no, llegando", which became a hit with more than 38 million views on YouTube. In 2022 he would release several songs in collaboration, including "Pica" with La Joaqui, "Salimo en caravana" with The La Planta and Locura Mix, "Turra (Remix)" with the R. Jota and PapiChamp, among others. The last song released by the artist was on 30 March of that same year, entitled "Allá" with R. Jota and DJ Plaga.

== Death ==
On 24 May 2022, Coronel was driving his motorcycle at a high rate of speed in Florencio Varela. At an intersection, his motorcycle collided with a Peugeot 308, and he fell, hitting his head on the pavement. He was admitted to El Cruce Hospital, where, on 3 June 2022, his death was reported.

== Discography ==
=== Singles ===
List of singles with release year, chart placement, certifications, and source album.
| Year | Title | Positioning in lists | Certifications | Album |
| Year | Title | ArgentinaARG | Certifications | Album |
|---|---|---|---|---|
| 2021 | «Tamo cello» | 19 | Argentina CAPIF: Gold | |
| 2021 | «Of the year» (with ) | 88 | | |
| 2021 | «Trucho» (with Perro Primo and DT.Bilardo) | 14 | Argentina CAPIF: Gold | |
| 2021 | «Cumbia cool» (with Al Records and DT.Bilardo) | — | | |
| 2021 | «Mecha» (with Perro Primo and DT.Bilardo) | — | | |
| 2021 | «Natalia» (with DT.Bilardo and Juan FLP) | — | | |
| 2021 | «The Noba | DJ Tao, DT.Bilardo Turreo Sessions #7» (with DJ Tao and DT.Bilardo) | 56 | | |
| 2021 | «Not going, arriving» (with Perro Primo, R Jota, DJ Plaga and DT.Bilardo) | 9 | | |
| 2022 | «Crazy Party» (with Matias Emmanuel) | — | | |
| 2022 | «Pica» (with La Joaqui and Al Records) | — | | |
| 2022 | «We went out in a caravan» (with The La Planta and Locura Mix) | 34 | | |
| 2022 | «Pilot» (with DJ Scourge) | — | | |
| 2022 | «There» (with R Jack and DJ Plaga) | — | | |
| 2022 | «Turra (Remix)» (with R Jota and PapiChamp) | — | | |
«—» Indicates that the single was not released or did not chart in that territory.
