= Toni Dalli =

Italian musician and restaurant owner (1933–2021)

- Dalli at the Ascari Racing track in Ronda, Spain, October 2007
- Born: Antonio D'Alessandro; 28 November 1933; Pescara, Abruzzo, Italy
- Died: 28 April 2021 (aged 87); Marbella, Spain

Toni Dalli (born Antonio D'Alessandro; 28 November 1933 – 28 April 2021) was an Italian musician and restaurant owner.

== Early life ==
Dalli was born in Pescara, Abruzzo, in central Italy. After singing at local functions there as a boy, he moved to Yorkshire, England at the age of sixteen. He became a British resident by working in the coal mines and steel mills for four years.

== Musical career ==
Whilst a miner he performed at local Working Men's Clubs and appeared in several TV amateur shows, such as Top Down, Bid For Fame, What Makes A Star and The Carroll Levis Discovery Show. He could not take up professional singing until he had completed the necessary four years residency pre-requisite of working in the steelworks.

Dalli was soon booked at the Cecil Cinema in Hull. Here, he was spotted by Percy Livingstone and Rob Goldstein (from 20th Century Fox), who told him that he must leave Yorkshire and go to London. By May 1957, Dalli was studying under singing teacher Dino Borgiole, and in October 1957, he performed at the Embassy Club. It was here that he was discovered by the comedian Max Bygraves, whose agent, Jock Jacobsen, also signed Dalli on.

By this time, Dalli was appearing in numerous major TV shows. In February 1958, he made his first appearance on The Ed Sullivan Show in New York, following by major performances at the Moulin Rouge, Hollywood and the Desert Inn in Las Vegas.

Upon Dalli's return to England, a contract was waiting for him with EMI Records and his first of five albums was recorded, including the hit song "Come Prima" ("More Than Ever"). Later, he recorded with Capitol Records and Decca, appearing in theatres throughout the world. These included two one-man-shows at the Carnegie Hall and Hollywood Bowl.

When Mario Lanza died in 1959, Dalli was signed up to do a motion picture based on his life, The Mario Lanza Story. The film was never released, for legal reasons. Dalli also sang in the US, where he had his own TV show on KCOP in Los Angeles for 13 weeks.

He also worked in Australia, South Africa and Hong Kong.

== Personal and later life ==
In 1960, he married Valerie, an English woman, in London and they had four children. After twenty-five years of constant travelling, Dalli opened a restaurant in Marbella, southern Spain.

Dalli died on 28 April 2021, aged 87.

== Sources ==
- Bowles, Frank. I... Who Had Nothing, The Toni Dalli Story. ISBN 84-607-5606-8.
