= Michele Merlo (singer) =

Italian singer-songwriter (1993–2021)

Michele Merlo (1 March 1993 in Rosà, province of Vicenza – 6 June 2021 in Bologna) was an Italian singer

== Biography ==
Merlo's career started during the 10th Italian edition of X Factor. However, he obtained notability during the 2017 edition of Amici di Maria De Filippi when he sang under the name of Mike Bird, a loose English translation of his name and surname. He released his first album, Cinemaboy, before the song "Tutto per me". In 2019, he released the songs "Non mi manchi più", "Mare", "Aquiloni" and "Tivù", while his second album, Cuori stupidi, was released in January 2020, with a total of nine songs.

On 3 June 2021, Merlo suffered a cerebral haemorrhage caused by fulminant leukaemia. He was recovering, though in critical condition and underwent surgery at the Ospedale Maggiore in Bologna, but died in the evening of 6 June 2021, at the age of 28. His family reported that Merlo went to hospital a couple of days before the hemorrhage, as he had leukemia symptoms, but was sent home.
