= Guem =

Algerian percussionist (1947–2021)

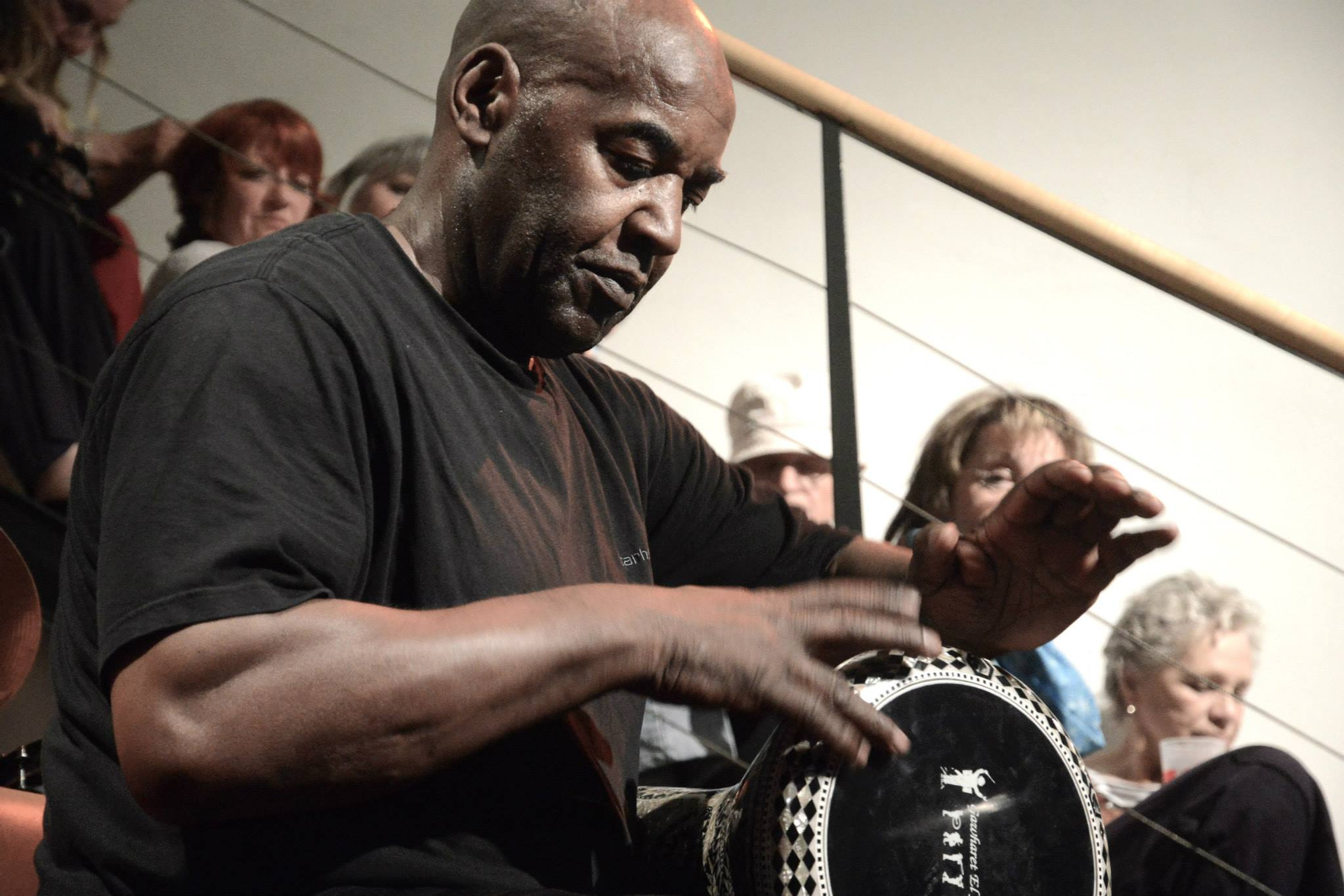
- Guem in 2014
- Born: Abdelmadjid Guemguem; 9 March 1947; Batna, French Algeria
- Died: 22 January 2021 (aged 73); Paris, France
- Occupation: Musician

Abdelmajid Guemguem (9 March 1947 – 22 January 2021), known professionally as Guem, was an Algerian percussionist, dancer and composer.

== Biography ==
Guem lived his youth in Batna. He performed in several musical troupes as a percussionist and was a footballer, playing for CA Batna. He permanently settled in France in the 1970s.

On 14 July 1966, he first took stage at a ball. In 1970, he was hired by the American Center in Paris, and would accompany jazz musicians such as Steve Lacy and Michel Portal. He then recorded several albums and made international tours, increasing his notoriety. He released his first album, Percussions Africaines in 1973, followed by Guem et Zaka in 1978. At that time, he also composed Le Serpent, re-recorded in 1996 for the program Ça se discute on France 2. In 2011, he composed Mon Paris, an album with one track dedicated to each arrondissement, and he summed it up by calling it the "most beautiful city in the world".

Guem's daughter, Sarah, sometimes accompanied him on stage as a dancer. Guem also gave lessons in percussion and dance at the Centre des arts vivants. His motto as an instructor was "Rhythm is life, and rhythm belongs to everyone. When you have a passion, you have to share it."

Guem died in Paris on 22 January 2021 at the age of 73.

== Discography ==
- Percussions Africaines (1973)
- Guem & Zaka Percussion (1978)
- O Universo Rítmico De Guem (1981)
- Félin (1983)
- Possession (1985)
- Danse (1993)
- Musiques de transe (1995)
- Baobab (1995)
- Voyage (1996)
- Rhythm'n'ball (1997)
- Percussions (1997)
- Royal Dance (1999)
- Libertés (2001)
- Live à l'Élysée Montmartre (2001)
- Rose Des Sables (2003)
- De la danse à la transe (2004)
- Caméléon (2004)
- Couleurs Pays (2007)
- Guem [Jérémy Soudant] (2009)
- Mon Paris (2011)
