= Grand Theatre, Łódź =

Coordinates: 51°46′24″N 19°28′12″E

Grand Theatre in Łódź
- Teatr Wielki w Łodzi
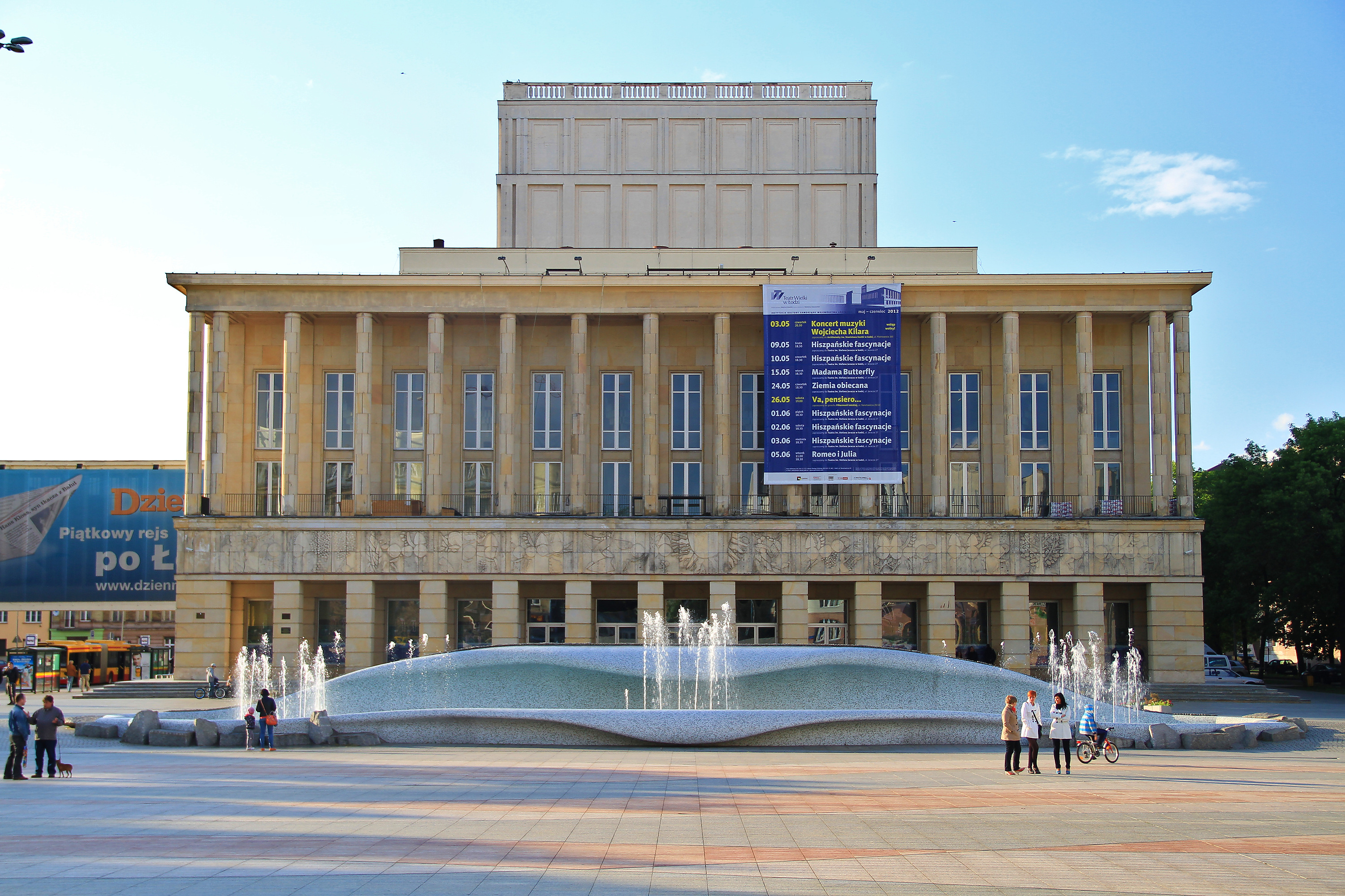
- The Grand Theatre in front of a shell-shaped fountain
- Interactive map of the Grand Theatre in Łódź area

General information
- Type: Theatre
- Architectural style: Socialist realism
- Location: Łódź, Poland, Plac Dąbrowskiego w Łodzi
- Groundbreaking: 1949
- Completed: 1966
- Opened: 1967

Design and construction
- Architects: Witold Korski, Józef Korski, Roman Szymborski

Other information
- Seating capacity: 1,074

Teatr Wielki w Łodzi (The Grand Theater in Łódź) is an opera house in Łódź, Poland. It is the largest theatre in the city, specialising in opera, operetta and ballet.

== History ==
It was opened on 19 January 1967 and by the end of 2005 it had staged 240 premieres. The theatre is one of the most important operatic venues in Poland. Its director is Dariusz Stachura.

The Teatr Wielki, located on Plac Dąbrowskiego, is the second largest opera house in Poland and one of the largest in Europe, with an auditorium which can seat 1074 people.

The house has staged works by composers of the past (including Tchaikovsky, Mozart, Verdi and Wagner) as well as contemporary figures (such as Krzysztof Penderecki and Bogdan Pawłowski). Its productions have travelled abroad throughout Europe and the United States. Artists including Victoria de los Ángeles, Andrea Bocelli, Angela Gheorghiu, José Cura and Plácido Domingo have appeared on its stage. Directors who have worked there include Adam Hanuszkiewicz and Ryszard Peryt. The building also hosts other events, such as New Year Balls and fashion shows. The most famous of these is the international film festival of the art of cinematography, Camerimage.

== See also ==
- Polish opera
- Theatre in Poland
