= Anouman Brou Félix =

Ivorian musician (1935–2021)

- Born: 5 February 1935; Adzopé, French West Africa
- Died: 3 October 2021 (aged 86); Abidjan, Ivory Coast
- Occupation: Musician

Anouman Brou Félix (5 February 1935 – 3 October 2021) was an Ivorian guitarist, bassist, and percussionist. He was one of the pioneers of Attie music and created the dance Wamy in the 1970s.

== Biography ==
Born in Adzopé in 1935, Félix's parents died in 1946. He left for Abidjan where he discovered dressmaking before learning guitar. In the 1960s, he founded the group Ivoiry Band and started the dance Wamy while in France.

Anouman Brou Félix died in Abidjan on 3 October 2021 at the age of 86.

== Discography ==
- Mon yé saka (1965)
- Houi layai (1966)
- Mon cœur l'OCAM (1966)
- Côte d'Ivoire / Anana force kié (1972)
- Danse Wamy (1977)
- Le passé et le présent (1984)
- African Pearls Vol. 5 : Côte d’Ivoire - West African Crossroads (2009)
- Concert Live vol.3 (Les géants de la musique ivoirienne) (2009)

== Distinctions ==
- Commander of the Order of Ivory Merit (2013)
