= Jan Vering =

German cinematographer (1954–2021)

- Born: 1954; Münster, North Rhine-Westphalia, West Germany
- Died: 1 January 2021 (aged 66–67); Siegen, North Rhine-Westphalia, Germany
- Occupations: Gospel singer; journalist; dramaturge

Jan Vering (1954 – 1 January 2021) was a German gospel singer, newspaper editor and dramaturge at the Apollo Theater in Siegen.

== Life ==
Vering was born in Münster and grew up in Vechta. He performed spirituals, gospels and songs by Duke Ellington in jazz clubs, in youth centres and at Kirchentag conventions. In 1983, he took part in a project about Martin Luther King's "I Have a Dream" ("Ich habe einen Traum") by writer Christian A. Schwarz and composer Siegfried Fietz. He often performed with the pianist Johannes Nitsch and the guitarist Werner Hucks.

Vering appeared as a singer for 18 years, performing more than 2500 concerts in Europe. In 1989, he began to work as a journalist for the Westfälische Rundschau in Siegen. He turned to a position as dramaturge at the new Apollo-Theater in 2007, retiring 10 years later.

Vering died in a nursing home in Wilnsdorf on the night of 1 January 2021.

== Work ==
=== Books ===
- Zeugen zur Sache. Hänssler, Holzgerlingen 1981
- Ein Lesebuch. Oncken, Kassel 1988
- Siegfried Fietz – Von guten Mächten und bewegten Zeiten (biography of Siegfried Fietz) Gerth Medien, Asslar 2011, ISBN 978-3-86591-582-5.
- Aufbruch wagen: Skulputen, Bilder. Kunstbroschüre. Abakus Musik Barbara Fietz, Greifenstein 2012

=== Audio books ===
- Liedbeschreibung. ERF-Verlag, Wetzlar 1988
- Zeugen zur Sache. ERF-Verlag, Wetzlar 1988
- Biografie von Siegfried Fietz: Von guten Mächten und bewegten Zeiten. Abakus Musik, Greifenstein 2017
