= Abdoul Jabbar =

Guinean singer-songwriter (1980–2021)

- Born: 1980; Fria, Guinea
- Died: 5 February 2021 (aged 41); Conakry, Guinea
- Occupation: Singer-Songwriter

Abdoul Jabbar (1980 – 5 February 2021) was a Guinean singer-songwriter. He sang in French, Susu, Fula, and Manding.

== Biography ==
Jabbar was born in 1980 in Fria, located in Maritime Guinea. He left his hometown for Conakry at age 10 and joined the dance group ABC, located in Dixinn. In 1994, he began pursuing rap and formed the group Libre Avo-k with DJ Vigor. Other groups he formed include Speed Goys and Dougou Faga. In 2001, he joined the group Staff Homogène before releasing his first solo album in 2005, titled Touligbeli.

In 2007, Jabbar released his second album, Le bas peuple, which featured Tiken Jah Fakoly and was recorded in Bamako. In 2010, he released the album Changeons d'esprit.

Abdoul Jabbar died in Conakry on 5 February 2021 at the age of 41 following a long illness.

== Discography ==
- Touligbeli (2005)
- Le bas peuple (2007)
- Africa (2008)
- Changeons d'esprit (2010)
- Wali. (2013)
