= Maria Theresa (disambiguation) =

Maria Theresa (1717–1780) was the ruler of the Habsburg monarchy and Holy Roman Empress consort as the wife of Francis I.

Maria Theresa, Maria Teresa, or Maria Theresia may also refer to:

== People ==
=== House of Habsburg ===
- Maria Theresa of Spain (1638–1683), Queen of France
- Archduchess Maria Theresa of Austria (1684–1696), daughter of Leopold I, Holy Roman Emperor and Eleonor Magdalene of Neuburg
- Archduchess Maria Theresa of Austria (1762–1770), daughter of Joseph II, Holy Roman Emperor and Princess Isabella of Parma
- Maria Theresa of Austria, Queen of Saxony (1767–1827)
- Maria Theresa of Naples and Sicily (1772–1807), Empress of Austria
- Maria Theresa of Austria-Este, Queen of Sardinia (1773–1832)
- Maria Theresa of Austria, Queen of Sardinia (1801–1855)
- Maria Theresa of Austria, Queen of the Two Sicilies (1816–1867)
- Archduchess Maria Theresa of Austria-Este, Countess of Chambord (1817–1886)
- Maria Theresa of Austria-Este, Queen of Bavaria (1849–1919)
- Archduchess Maria Theresa of Austria, Duchess of Württemberg (1845–1927)

=== House of Braganza ===
- Infanta Maria Theresa of Portugal (1855–1944), Archduchess of Austria
- Princess Maria Theresa of Löwenstein-Wertheim-Rosenberg (1870-1935), Duchess of Braganza
- Maria Teresa, Princess of Beira (1793-1874), Portuguese Infanta

=== House of Bourbon ===
- Maria Teresa, Grand Duchess of Luxembourg (born 1956)
- María Teresa Rafaela of Spain (1726-1746), Infanta of Spain
- Marie Thérèse of France (1778-1851), Madame Royal and Dauphine of France.
- Princess María Teresa of Bourbon-Parma (1933–2020), known as the "red princess"

=== House of Savoy ===
- Princess Maria Theresa of Savoy (1756-1805), Countess of Artois
- Princess Maria Teresa of Savoy (1803-1879), Duchess of Parma

=== Other people ===
- María Teresa Adames (born 1941), Mexican diver
- Maria Teresa Agnesi Pinottini (1720–1795), Italian composer
- María Teresa Álvarez Vázquez (born 1965), Mexican politician
- Maria Teresa Andruetto (born 1954), Argentine writer
- Maria Teresa Armengol, Andorran politician
- María Teresa Babín Cortés (1910–1989), Puerto Rican educator
- Maria Teresa Baldini (born 1961), Italian politician, physician and basketball player
- Maria Teresa Bassa Poropat (born 1946), Italian politician
- Maria Teresa Beccari (1950–2020), Sanmarinese politician
- María Teresa Belandria (born 1963), Venezuelan diplomat, lawyer, professor and politician
- Maria Teresa Bellucci (born 1972), Italian politician
- Maria Teresa Cabré (born 1947), Spanish linguist
- María Teresa Cabrera (born 1968), Peruvian politician
- María Teresa Campos (1941–2023), Spanish journalist and television presenter
- María Teresa Campoy Ruy (born 1959), Mexican politician
- María Teresa Cano (born 1960), Colombian artist
- Maria Teresa Cárcomo Lobo, Portuguese politician and jurist
- Maria Teresa Carlson (1963–2001), Filipino actress
- Maria Teresa Casini (1864–1937), Italian nun
- María Teresa Castañón (born 1978), Chilean politician
- María Teresa Castillo (1908–2012), Venezuelan politician
- Maria Teresa B. Cenzon, Guamanian judge
- María Teresa Chacín (born 1945), Venezuelan singer
- María Teresa Chávez Campomanes (1890–1981), Mexican librarian
- María Teresa Chávez (born 1953), Honduran politician
- Maria Teresa Correia de Barros, Portuguese electrical engineer
- Maria Teresa de Filippis (1926–2016), Italian racing driver
- Maria Teresa de Noronha (1918–1993), Portuguese aristocrat and fado singer
- María Teresa de Vallabriga (1758–1820), Spanish aristocrat
- María Teresa de Vega, Spanish writer and poet
- María Teresa del Canto (1898–1987), Chilean teacher and politician
- Maria Teresa del Real, American ballet dancer
- María Teresa Dova, Argentinian physicist
- María Teresa Estevan Bolea, Spanish politician
- María Teresa Fernández de la Vega (born 1949), Spanish politician
- María Teresa Ferrari (1887–1956), Argentinian physician and university professor
- Maria Teresa Ferrer i Mallol (1940–2017), Catalan historian
- María Teresa Freyre de Andrade (1896–1975), Cuban librarian and information scientist
- María Teresa García Pedroche, American artist and curator
- María Teresa Gargallo (born 1969), Spanish race walker
- Maria Teresa Gargano (born 1986), Italian artistic gymnast
- María Teresa González, Puerto Rican politician
- María Teresa Margarita González (born 1961), Argentine politician
- María Teresa González Garza y Barron, Mexican biotechnologist
- Maria Teresa Maia Gonzalez (born 1958), Portuguese writer
- Maria Teresa Gozzadini, Italian countess and geologist
- María Teresa Herrera (born 1956), Mexican lawyer
- María Teresa Herreras López, Spanish swimmer
- María Teresa Hincapié (1956–2008), Colombian performance artist
- Maria Teresa Horta (born 1937), Portuguese journalist and activist
- María Teresa Infante Caffi, Chilean diplomat
- María Teresa Jiménez Esquivel (born 1984), Mexican politician
- María Teresa Kumar, Colombian American political rights activist
- Maria Teresa Landi, Italian epidemiologist and oncologist
- María Teresa Lara (1904–1984), Mexican lyricist and composer
- María Teresa León (1903–1988), Spanish politician, writer and activist
- María Teresa Linares Savio (1920–2021), Cuban musicologist, ethnographer and music researcher
- María Teresa Londoño, First Lady of Colombia (1930–1934)
- María Teresa López, multiple people
- María Teresa Macías (born 1975), Spanish politician
- María Teresa Martín-Vivaldi (born 1955), Spanish painter
- María Teresa Marú Mejía (1958–2021), Mexican politician
- María Teresa Méndez (born 1982), Spanish freestyle wrestler
- María Teresa Mirabal (1935–1960), surveyor and political activist from the Dominican Republic
- María Teresa Miras Portugal (1948–2021), Spanish scientist
- María Teresa Monasterio (born 1969), Bolivian weightlifter
- María Teresa Mora (1902–1980), Cuban chess player
- Maria Teresa Motta (born 1963), Italian judoka
- María Teresa Murillo (1928–2017), Colombian botanist and pteridologist
- Maria Teresa Naranjo Ochoa (1937–2007), Mexican virtuoso pianist and teacher
- María Teresa Obregón Zamora (1888–1956), Costa Rican politician
- María Teresa Ochoa Mejía (born 1954), Mexican politician
- María Teresa Oller, Spanish composer and folklorist
- Maria Teresa Parpagliolo (1903–1974), Italian landscape and garden designer
- Maria Teresa Pelegrí i Marimón (1907–1995), Spanish composer
- María Teresa Pérez (Venezuelan politician), Venezuelan politician
- Maria Theresia (Rie) Mair (born 1896), Dutch war resister
- María Teresa Pomar (1919–2010), Mexican art historian
- María Teresa Prieto (1896–1982), Spanish composer
- Maria Teresa Ramírez (born 1954), Mexican swimmer
- María Teresa Rejas (born 1946), Spanish politician
- Maria Teresa Riedl (1937–1995), Italian tennis player
- María Teresa Rivas (1918–2010), Mexican actress
- María Teresa Rivera, woman’s human rights defender
- María Teresa Rodríguez del Toro y Alaysa (1781–1803), wife of Simón Bolivar
- Maria Teresa Romero (born 1930), Spanish painter and archer
- María Teresa Ronderos (born 1959), Colombian journalist
- María Teresa Ruiz (born 1946), Chilean astronomer
- Maria Teresa Ruta (born 1960), Italian showgirl and television presenter
- María Teresa Santamaría, Cuban volleyball player
- Maria Teresa Schutzmann (born 1979), Italian sprinter
- María Teresa Sesé (1917–2019), Spanish writer
- María Teresa Sosa (1930–2018), Guatemalan politician
- María Teresa Toral Peñaranda (1911–1994), Spanish chemist, pharmacist, printmaker, political prisoner
- María Teresa Torras (1927–2009), Venezuelan sculptor and artist
- María Teresa Torró Flor (born 1992), Spanish tennis player
- María Teresa Uribe (1940–2019), Colombian sociologist
- María Teresa Valdés (1961–2003), Spanish archer
- María Teresa Vera (1895–1965), Cuban musician
- María Teresa Villagrasa Pérez (born 1957), Spanish schoolteacher and politician
- Maria Theresia Ahlefeldt (1755–1810), composer and Countess of Ahlefeldt-Langeland

== Places ==
- Maria Theresa Reef, a reef in the South Pacific
- Maria Theresia Garden Square (Uzhhorod), a Ukrainian public square
- Maria-Theresia-Gymnasium, a school in Munich

== Other uses ==
- 22nd SS Volunteer Cavalry Division Maria Theresia, a Waffen-SS Division commonly known by the name Maria Theresia
- Maria Theresa (film), a 1951 Austrian film
- Maria Theresia (miniseries), an Austria-Czech television miniseries
- Maria Theresa thaler, a silver bullion coin

== People with the given names ==
- Maria Theresa Short (d. 1869), Scottish entrepreneur from Edinburgh
- María Teresa Andruetto, Argentina children's writer
- Maria Teresa Armengol, Andorran politician
- Maria Theresia Bonzel, German nun
- Maria Teresa Carlson, Filipina actor and model
- María Teresa Fernández de la Vega, Spanish politician
- María Teresa Ferrari, Argentina doctor
- Maria Teresa de Filippis, Italian racecar driver
- María Teresa Lara, a Mexican composer
- Maria Theresa Longworth, plaintiff in an Irish mixed religion marriage case
- Maria Teresa Merlo, Italian abbess
- María Teresa Mirabal, Dominican political activist
- María Teresa Mora, a Cuban chess master
- María Teresa Oller (1920-2018), Spanish composer and folklorist
- Maria Theresia von Paradis, Austria composer
- Maria Teresa Ruta, Italian TV personality

== See also ==
- Maria (disambiguation)
- Marie Thérèse (disambiguation)
- Teresa (disambiguation)
