= Maite (given name) =

Maite (/ˈmaɪteɪ/ MY-tay, Spanish: [ˈmajte], Basque: [majˈte]; Brazilian Portuguese: Maitê or Maytê [majˈte]), also spelled Mayté, Maytee, Maytte or (in French) Maïté, is a female given name of Iberian origin popular throughout the Hispanic world and Brazil. The name is the Basque word for 'love', though it can also be a nickname for "María Teresa" and "María Esther".

== People ==
=== Maite and variants ===
- Maïté (1938–2024), French TV cooking host
- Maite Alberdi (born 1983), Chilean film director, producer, screenwriter and critic
- Maité Allamand (1911–1996), Chilean writer and diplomat
- Maite Andreu (born 1971), Spanish handball player
- Maite Aranburu, Spanish politician
- Maite Arruabarrena (born 1964), Spanish mezzo-soprano and psychologist
- Maite Axiari (1949–2021) was a French feminist activist
- Maïté Brandt-Pearce, American optical engineer
- Maite Carranza (born 1958), Spanish writer and educator
- Maite Cazorla (born 1997), Spanish basketball player
- Maite Conde, professor of Brazilian Studies at the University of Cambridge
- Maite Delgado (born 1966), Venezuelan TV host
- Maite Delteil (born 1933), French painter
- Maite Dono (born 1969), Spanish singer-songwriter, poet, and actress
- Maïté Duval (1944–2019), Dutch-French sculptor and drafter
- Maite Gabarrús-Alonso (born 1989), Spanish tennis player
- Mayte Guzman (born 2006), Bolivian rhythmic gymnast
- Maite Hontelé (born 1980), Dutch trumpeter
- Maite Idirin (1943– 2024), Spanish singer of Basque origin
- Maite Kelly (born 1979), Irish-American singer
- Maite Lazkano (1917–2019), Spanish writer
- Maite Lizaso (born 1983), Spanish footballer
- Maité Machado Palma (born 1998), Luxembourgish footballer
- Maite Maiora (born 1980), Spanish sky and trail runner
- Maite Martínez Pérez (born 1967), Spanish tennis player
- Maïté Mathieu (1928–2021), French feminist activist
- Mayte Méndez (1961–2024), Spanish basketball coach
- Maïté Nahyr (1947–2012), Belgian actress
- Maite Nkoana-Mashabane (born 1963), formerly Maite Mohale, South African politician and former Minister of Women, Youth and Persons with Disabilities
- Maite Oronoz Rodríguez (born 1976), Puerto Rican judge, current Chief Justice of the Supreme Court of Puerto Rico
- Maite Oroz (born 1998), Spanish footballer
- Maite Orsini (born 1988), Chilean lawyer, politician, and former actress and model
- Maite Pagazaurtundúa (born 1965), Spanish politician, activist and writer
- Maite Perroni (born 1983), Mexican actress and singer
- Maitê Proença (born 1958), Brazilian actress
- Maite Ruiz de Austri (born 1959), Spanish writer, screenwriter and director
- Maite Schwartz, American actress
- Maïté Blanchette Vézina, Canadian politician
- Maite Zabala (born 1979), American soccer coach and former player
- Maite Zubieta (born 2004), Spanish footballer
- Maite Zugarrondo (born 1989), Spanish handballer
- Maite Zúñiga (born 1964), Spanish athlete
- Rose-Maïté Erkoreka (born 1976), Canadian actress and playwright

=== Maitee ===
- Maitee Hatsady (born 1998), Laotian footballer

=== Mayte and variants ===
- Mayte Brito (born 1991 or 1992), Dominican model
- Mayte Carol (1941–2024), Mexican actress
- Mayte Espinosa, Spanish Paralympic athlete
- Mayte Garcia (born 1973), American dancer and former singer, ex-wife of Prince
- Mayte Gargallo (born 1969), Spanish racewalker
- Mayte Macanás (born 1984), Spanish singer and participant in Operación Triunfo
- Mayte Martín (born 1965), Spanish singer
- Mayte Martínez (born 1976), Spanish athlete
- Mayte Mateos (born 1951), member of Spanish 1970s disco duo Baccara
- Mayte Penelas, Spanish historian and philologist
- Maytê Piragibe (born 1983), Brazilian actress
- Mayte Richardson (1889–1963), American cleric
- Mayte Michelle Rodriguez (born 1978), American actress
- Mayte Rodríguez (born 1989), Chilean actress and model
- Mayte Sánchez (born 1984), Panamanian model
- Mayte Vilán (born 1970), Cuban-born actress

=== Maytee ===
- Maytee Martinez (born 1992), Cuban-American model, designer, and television personality
- Maytee Pungpoh (born 1984), Thai footballer
