= Pedroche (surname) =

Pedroche is a Spanish surname. Notable people with the surname include:

- Cristina Pedroche (born 1988), Spanish actress, presenter, comedian, television reporter, and model
- María Teresa García Pedroche (born 1959), American artist and curator
