= Radionovela =

Audio drama genre

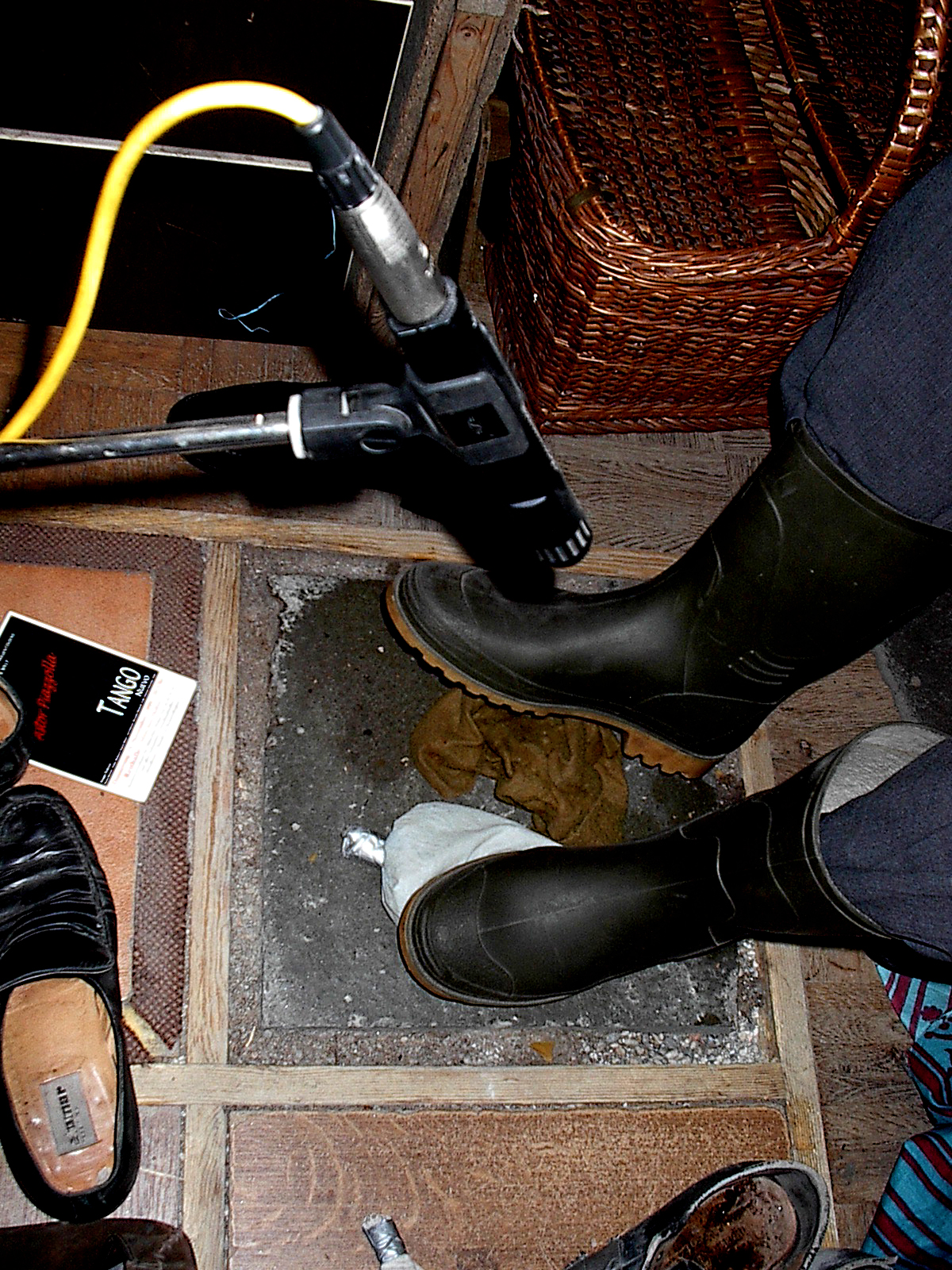
Sound effect of footsteps being recorded

A radionovela (also known as serial radiofónico or simply serial) is a type of radio drama first broadcast in Latin America in the early 20th century. Radionovelas are typically melodramas or soap operas which are issued in chapters, in contrast to other radio dramas which may encompass different genres and are often broadcast as individual works, such as The War of the Worlds.

With the advent of television, the radionovela began to be displaced by the telenovela, while the Internet allows for a renewal of the genre in the form of the "MP3 saga" (most notably in the French-speaking world).

== In Argentina ==
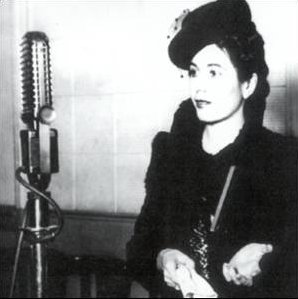
Eva Perón, who became a popular radio actress in the early 1940s

The first example of serial radio drama in Argentina was probably Francisco Mastandrea's La caricia del lobo in the late 1920s. But their golden age was the 1940s, making a star of future First Lady Eva Perón.

Los Pérez García, a long serial about a typical Argentine family, was perhaps the highlight of the 1950s. Later, more innovative crime fiction and noir-themed shows emerged.

== In Chile ==
In addition to El siniestro Doctor Mortis, a creation of Eva Martinic and Juan Marino, Eduardo Calixto is considered a pioneer of radio stories in Chile, through his work ¡Hogar, dulce hogar! This was conceived by the author in a cafe in Santiago, where he wrote in dashed lines on a napkin. It remained on the air for over 40 years.

== In Costa Rica ==
The communications center Voces Nuestras produced a series of radio dramas with a political and educational approach within a traditional melodramatic package. They covered topics such as migration, the lives of miners, and domestic violence. Among these was Pueblo de Paso, broadcast on 184 stations in Latin America, including 10 Spanish-language stations in the United States. It incorporated the music of Perrozompopo, Papaya Music, Miriam Jarquín, and Guillermo Anderson.

== In Cuba ==
As in many other Latin American countries, the melodramatic and tear-jerker radionovela achieved great popularity among the Cuban audience. El collar de lágrimas, a serial by José Sánchez Arcilla, was the longest-running Cuban radionovela with 965 episodes. It went off the air on 31 December 1946. Likewise, Félix B. Caignet's magnum opus El derecho de nacer holds an abiding place in sentimental memory, perhaps owing its longevity to television adaptations which have been made in several Latin American countries.

== In Great Britain ==
British productions resembling radionovelas were dedicated to characters such as Sherlock Holmes and the detectives of Agatha Christie. Several adaptations of J. R. R. Tolkien's work were also created, beginning with a 1955 dramatization of The Lord of the Rings, which was divided into 12 episodes and aired in two parts. Two other adaptations were made in 1979 and 1981.

== In Honduras ==
In Honduras, notable series include Las historietas de Frijol el Terrible by Carlos Salgado and Cuentos y Leyendas de Honduras by Jorge Montenegro.

== In Mexico ==
Some histories attribute the first radionovela in Mexico to XEW.

The first radionovela in Mexico, The Three Musketeers, was transmitted by XEW in 1932, but it was not until 1941, with Ave sin nido ("Bird Without a Nest"), the exciting life of Anita de Montemar, that this radio genre gained momentum and began to transmit up to five radionovelas a day – which, as in the United States, were sponsored by manufacturers of soap, perfume, and cleaning products.

Perhaps one of the most popular radionovela heroes in Mexico (and later in Central America, Colombia, and Ecuador) was Kalimán, created in 1963 and then transferred to cartoon in 1965.

Radio professional Vicente Leñero related some guidelines and literary devices for radionovela melodrama from his time as an XEW writer (on serials such as Entre mi amor y tu, La sangre baja del río, Boda de plata, and La fea):

Structure synopses monthly, weekly, and daily. Perform psychological analysis on the characters. Plan mild suspense before commercials, disturbing suspense for the end of the chapter, and frightful suspense for the end of the week.

== In Paraguay ==
Radionovelas were broadcast in Paraguay by Radio Nacional 920 AM-95.1 FM.

== In Spain ==
Spanish stations which pioneered the broadcasting of popular and historically important serials at the national level were Cadena SER and Radio Nacional de España (RNE). Cadena SER reached its zenith of popularity with series such as Ama Rosa and Simplemente María. The latter series reached 501 daily one-hour episodes during its broadcast run from 1971 to 1974. One of the last popular series in this vein was La Saga de los Porretas, broadcast between 1976 and 1988.

Among the jewels of Radio Nacional de España was an adaptation of the novel El viaje a ninguna parte, a radionovela which was recorded and broadcast in 1983.

The last radio drama to be regularly broadcast nationally was Historias, on RNE's Radio 1, beginning in September 2003.

Radio 3, under the direction of Federico Volpini in 2000, recaptured the spirit of the radio series with Cuando Juan y Tula fueron a Siritinga, a creation of Carlos Faraco. It was broadcast in 86 chapters of approximately ten minutes.

Ars sonora, a weekly series on Radio Clásica, has offered more than 100 radio theater works since 1985.

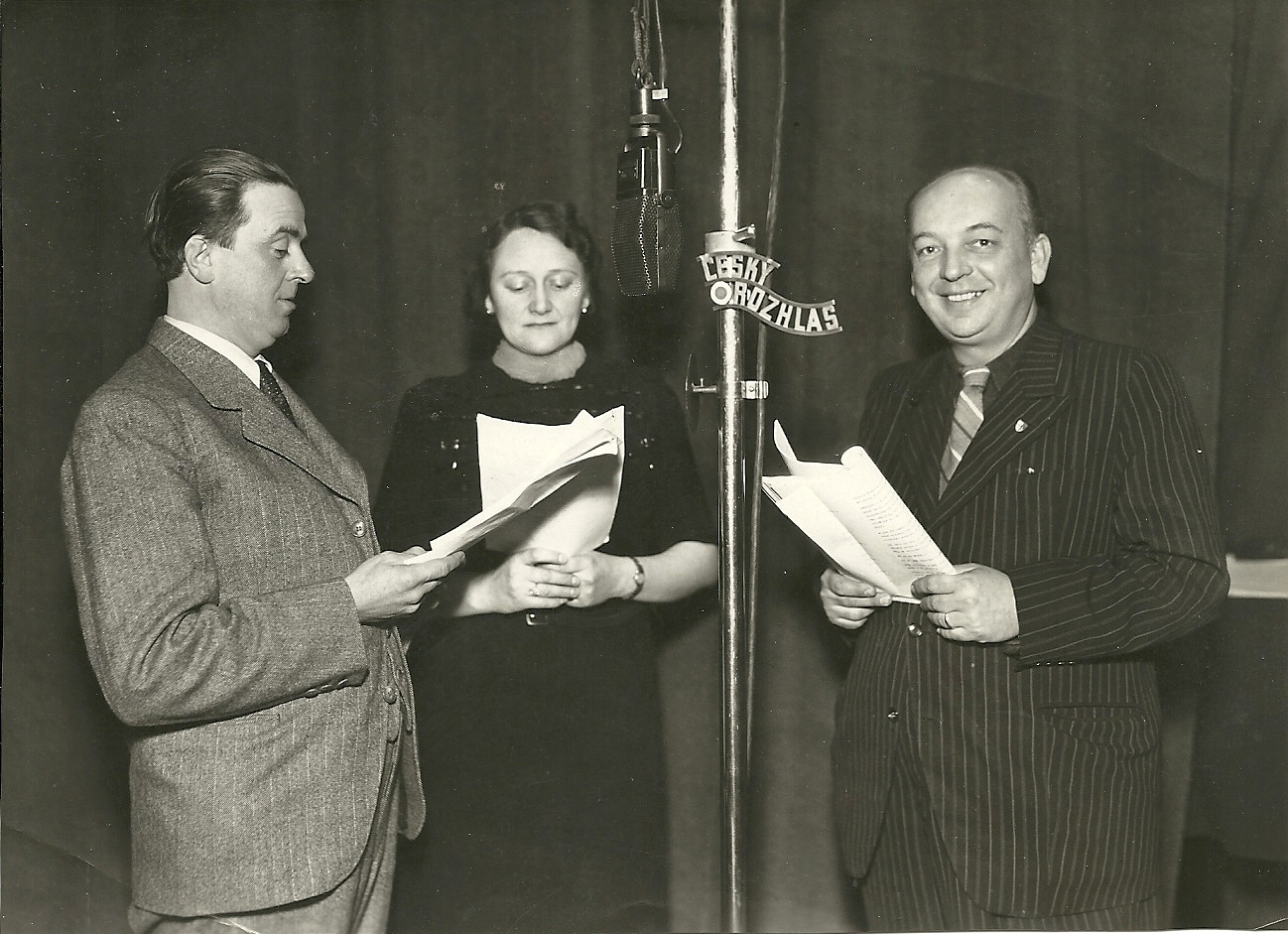
Czech dramatic actors at the microphone

== In Uruguay ==
In the late 1920s, Uruguayan radio stations broadcast theater works in auditoriums in Montevideo. In 1930 the first acting troupes led by Concepción Olona and the husband and wife team Pedro Becco and Teresa Lacanau adapted classics of international literature. The radionovela appeared with the creation of Las Aventuras de Carlos Norton (a Heraclio Sena production for CX 22 radio Fada), and a little later Brochazos Camperos (1935, CX 14 radio El Espectador) and La Querencia.

== In Venezuela ==
Among the first serials to be recorded in Venezuela was El derecho de nacer, about the life, work, and passion of Jesus Christ.

When the radionovela began to be displaced by the telenovela, the actor and announcer Alberto Cimino formed the company El Universo del Espectáculo (The Universe of Entertainment), recovering the best classic radionovelas and producing new stories to be broadcast on several Venezuelan stations.

== See also ==
- History of radio
- Radio drama
- Serial (radio and television)
- Telenovela
