= Punta Arenas =

City in Magallanes y Antártica Chilena, Chile

Punta Arenas Sandy Point Magallanes
- City and commune
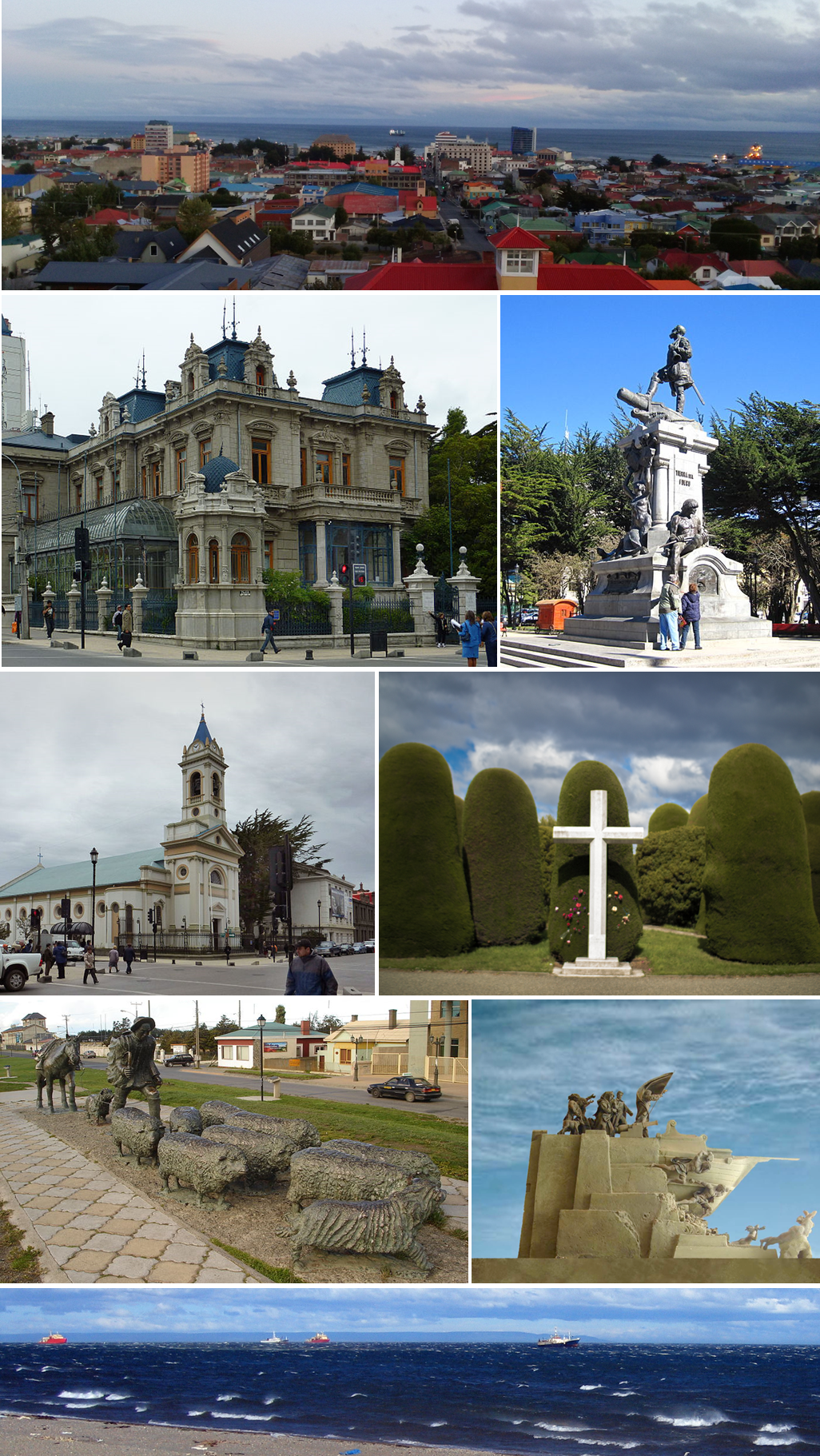
- Top: Panoramic view of downtown Punta Arenas, from La Cruz Hills; Second: Sara Braun Palace (Palacio Sara Braun), Ferdinand Magellan Monument in Muñoz Gamero Square (Plaza Muñoz Gamero); Third: Punta Arenas Sacred Heart Cathedral, Cemetery of Punta Arenas; Fourth: Shepherd Monument, Goleta Ancud Monument; Bottom: An overview of Strait of Magellan, from Costanera area

- Coat of arms Location in Chile
- Motto: "Labor omnia vincit" ("Work conquers all")
- Coordinates (city): 53°9′45″S 70°54′29″W
- Country: Chile
- Region: Magallanes y Antártica Chilena
- Province: Magallanes
- Founded as: Punta Arenas
- Foundation: 18 December 1848

Government
  - Type: Municipality
  - Mayor: Claudio Radonich (RN)

Area
  - Total: 17,846.3 km^{2} (6,890.5 sq mi)
- Elevation: 34 m (112 ft)

Population (2024)
  - Total: 132,363
  - Density: 7.41683/km^{2} (19.2095/sq mi)
  - Urban: 125,487
  - Rural: 6,876
- Demonym: Puntarenian
- Time zone: UTC−3 (CLT)
- Area code: 56 + 61
- Climate: Cfc
- Website: www.puntaarenas.cl (in Spanish)

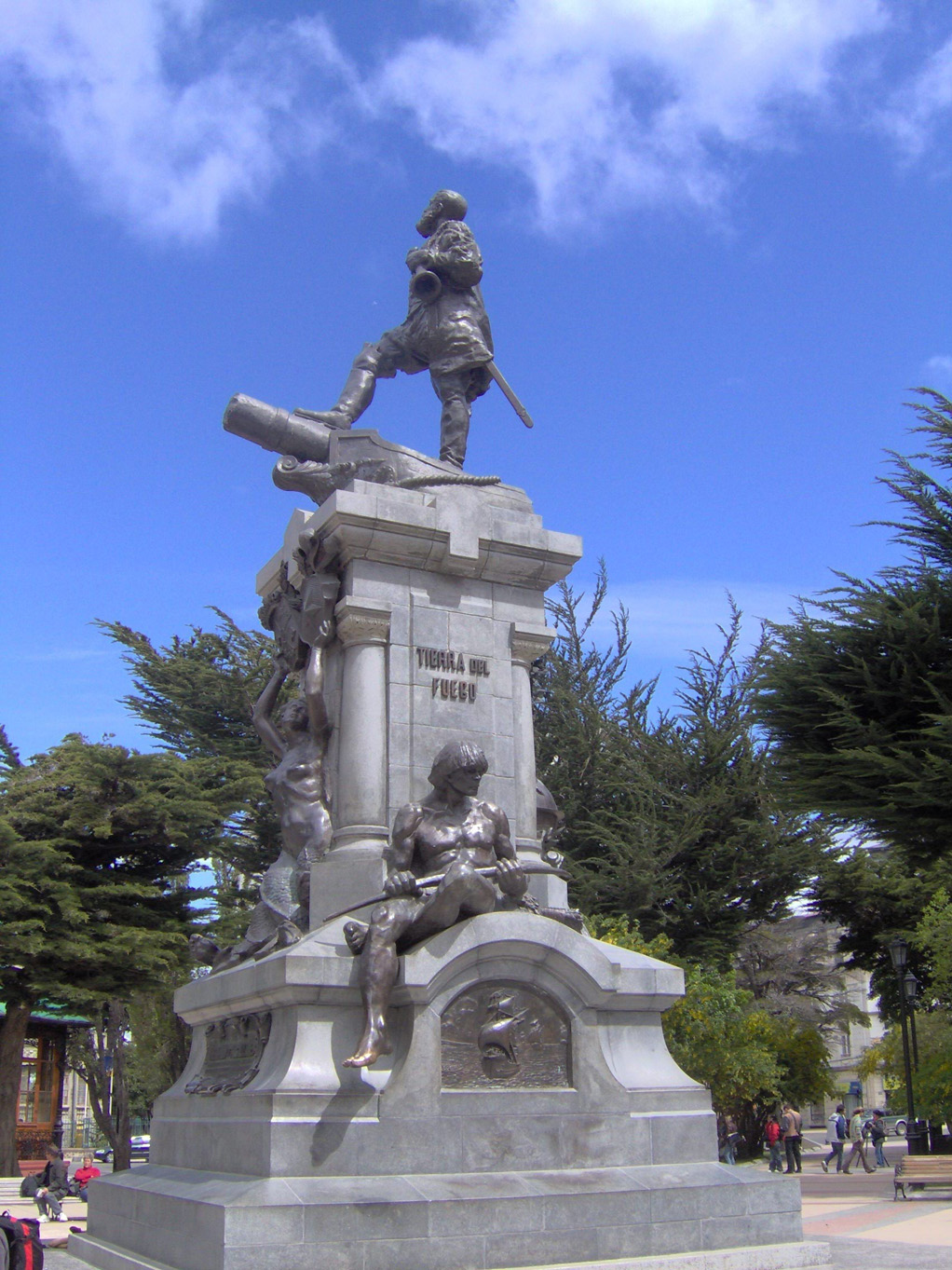
1920 memorial to Ferdinand Magellan in Punta Arenas, 2007

Punta Arenas (Spanish pronunciation: [ˈpunta aˈɾenas], historically known as Sandy Point in English) is the capital city of Chile's southernmost region, Magallanes and Antarctica Chilena. Although the city officially was renamed Magallanes in 1927, its name was changed back to Punta Arenas in 1938. The city is the world's largest south of the 46th parallel south. Due to its location, it is also the coldest coastal city with more than 100,000 inhabitants in Latin America. Punta Arenas is one of the world's most southerly ports and serves as an Antarctic gateway city. Punta Arenas is the world's southernmost city with more than 100,000 inhabitants and claims the title of southernmost city in the world, although that title is also claimed by Ushuaia in Argentina, which lies farther south but is slightly smaller than Punta Arenas, and Puerto Williams in Chile, which lies farther south still but is smaller than Ushuaia.

Since 1977, Punta Arenas has been one of only two free ports in Chile, the other being Iquique in the country's far north. (Note: Punta Arenas itself is not a "free port": Outside the city there is a "zona franca" where certain products can be imported into the country under a reduced-tax regime.) Located on the Brunswick Peninsula north of the Strait of Magellan, Punta Arenas was originally established by the Chilean government in 1848 as a small penal colony to assert sovereignty over the Strait. During the remainder of the 19th century, Punta Arenas grew in size and importance due to increasing maritime traffic to the west coasts of South and North America. The city's growth was also due to waves of European immigrants, mainly from Dalmatia in what is now Croatia, and Russia, attracted by a gold rush, and sheep farming boom in the 1880s and early 20th century. The largest sheep company, which controlled 10,000 square kilometres in Chile and Argentina, was based in Punta Arenas, and its owners lived there.

Since its founding, Chile has used Punta Arenas as a base to defend its sovereignty claims in the southernmost part of South America. That led to the Strait of Magellan being recognized as Chilean territory in the Boundary Treaty of 1881 between Chile and Argentina. Punta Arenas' geopolitical importance has remained high in the 20th and 21st centuries due to its logistic significance in accessing the Antarctic Peninsula.

Since 2017, the city and its region have been on their own time zone, using summer time throughout the year (UTC−3). The city is supplied with water from the San Juan River.

== Etymology ==
The name Punta Arenas whose literal translation would be "Point Sands", is actually derived from the Spanish term Punta Arenosa, a literal translation of the English name "Sandy Point".

The name Sandy Point derives from the voyage of John Narborough in 1669-1671. He wrote in his account:

Sand-Point [sic] is a mean low Point, lies out more than the other Points of the shore, and a few trees grow on it.

The English 18th-century explorer John Byron is sometimes erroneously credited with naming the area.

The city has also been known as Magallanes. Today that term is normally used to describe the administrative region which includes the city.

Punta Arenas has been nicknamed "the city of the red roofs" for the red-painted metal roofs that characterized the city for many years. Since about 1970, the availability of other colours in protective finishes has resulted in greater variety in the characteristic metal roofs.

== History ==
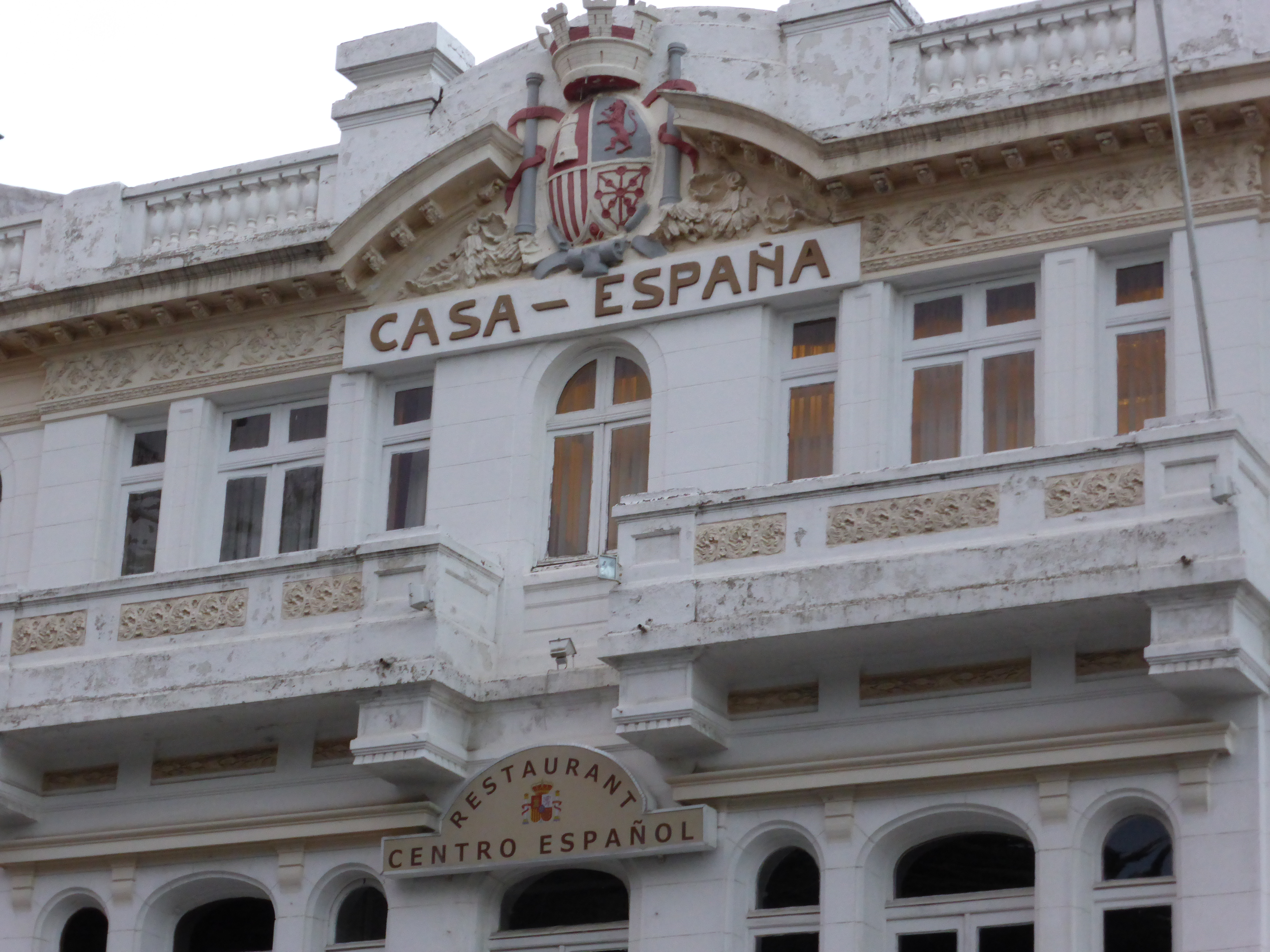
Casa España, established in 1917 by the Spanish Society of Socorros Mutuos. It was formed between 1936 and 1938. Plaza de Armas (Muñoz Gamero Park).

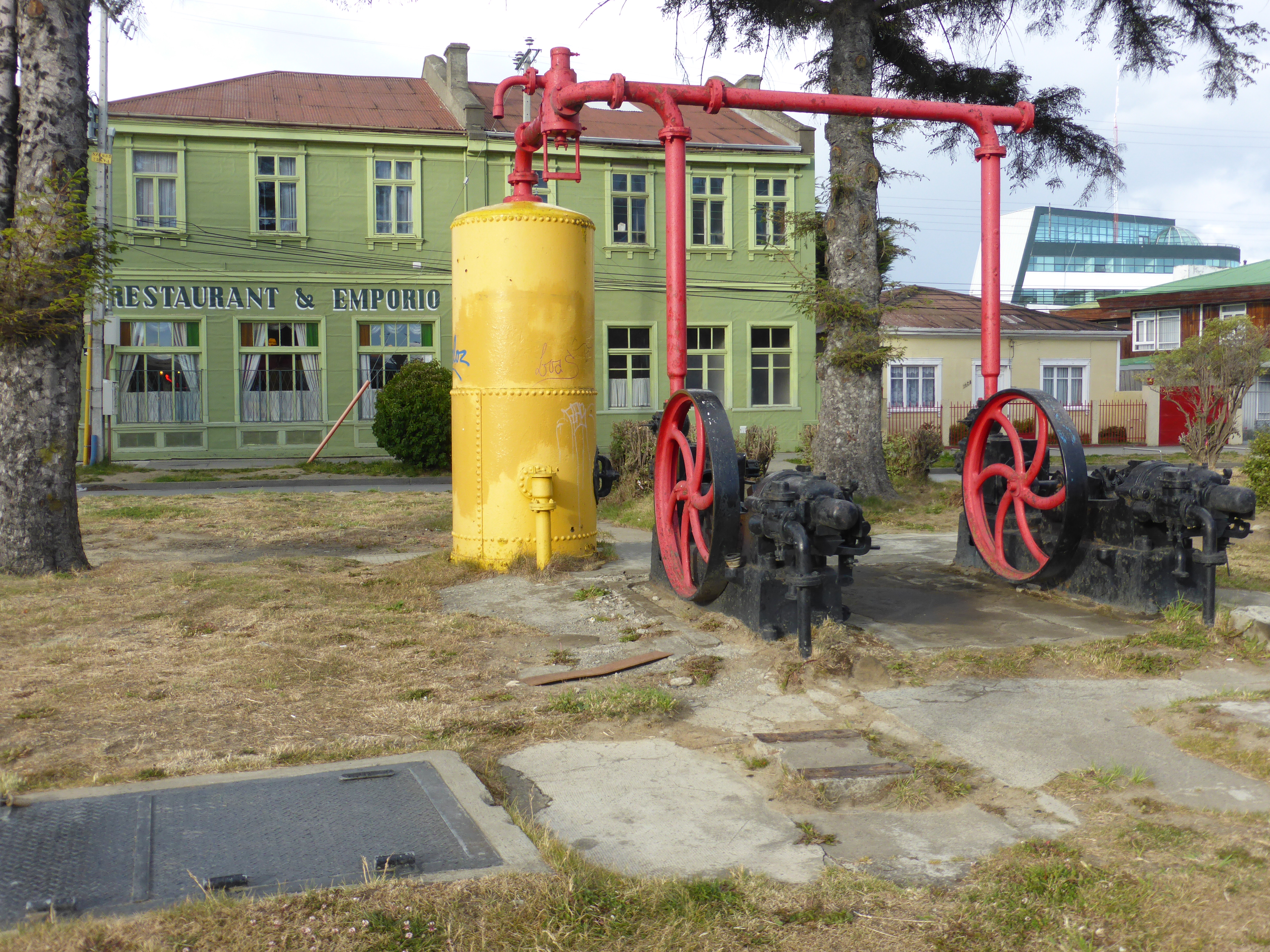
Christopher Columbus Avenue, the location of the Old Machine House, built in 1890 by Croatians, 2017

Two early Spanish settlements were attempted along this coast (on the Straits of Magellan). The first was founded in 1584 and was called Nombre de Jesús. It failed due to the harsh weather and difficulty in the settlers' obtaining food and water, and the enormous distances from other Spanish ports. A second colony, Ciudad del Rey don Felipe, was attempted about 80 kilometres south of Punta Arenas. This became known later as Puerto del Hambre, which translates to Port Famine. Spain had established these settlements in an attempt to protect its shipping and prevent piracy by English pirates, by controlling the Straits of Magellan. An English privateer, Thomas Cavendish, during his circumnavigation, rescued the last surviving member of Puerto del Hambre in 1587.

=== Penal colony ===
In 1843 the Chilean government sent an expedition to build a fort and establish a permanent settlement on the shores of the Strait of Magellan. It built and commissioned a schooner called Goleta Ancud which, under the command of John Williams Wilson of the Chilean Navy, transported a crew of 21 people (captain, eighteen crew, and two women), plus cargo, to accomplish the mandate. The founding act of the settlement took place on 21 September 1843.

The fort was well-positioned on a small rocky peninsula, but the location could not support a proper civilian settlement. With that in mind, in 1848, the military governor, José de los Santos Mardones, decided to move the settlement to its current location, along the Las Minas river, and renamed it Punta Arenas.

In the mid-19th century, Chile used Punta Arenas as a penal colony and a disciplinary posting for military personnel with "problematic" behaviour. It also settled immigrants there. In December 1851, a prisoners' mutiny led by Lieutenant Cambiaso, resulted in the murder of Governor Muñoz Gamero and the resident priest, and the destruction of the church and the hospital. The mutiny was put down by Commander Stewart of HMS Virago assisted by two Chilean ships: Indefatigable and Meteoro.

In 1867, President José Joaquín Pérez issued a decree offering land grants in an effort to get Chileans or foreigners to settle around Punta Arenas. The first British immigrants arrived in 1867, and their number increased as sheep farming grew in the Chilean Magallanes. The greatest immigration continued to be by the British until 1906, when Croatians surpassed them in numbers.

An 1877 mutiny, known as El motín de los artilleros (Mutiny of the Artillerymen), led to the destruction of a large part of the town and the murder of many civilians not directly associated with the prison. In time the city was restored. The growth of the sheep farming industry and the discovery of gold, as well as increasing trade via sailing ships, attracted many new settlers, and the town began to prosper.

=== Economic boom ===
Between about 1890 and 1940, the Magallanes region became an important sheep-raising region, with one company (Sociedad Explotadora de Tierra del Fuego) controlling over 11,000 square kilometres (4,200 sq mi). In 1910, Sociedad Explotadora merged with Sociedad Ganadera, resulting in a company possessing 3 million hectares in southern Chile and Argentina, with over two million head of sheep. The headquarters of this company and the residences of the owners were in Punta Arenas. The Sarah Braun Museum is now established at the former Braun-Menéndez mansion, in the centre of Punta Arenas.

The Punta Arenas harbour, although exposed to storms, was considered one of the most important in Chile before the construction of the Panama Canal. It was used as a coaling station by the steamships transiting between the Atlantic and Pacific oceans. Today it is mostly used by tourism cruises and scientific expeditions.

=== Modern city ===
The city is often a base for Antarctic expeditions, along with Ushuaia (Argentina) and Christchurch (New Zealand).

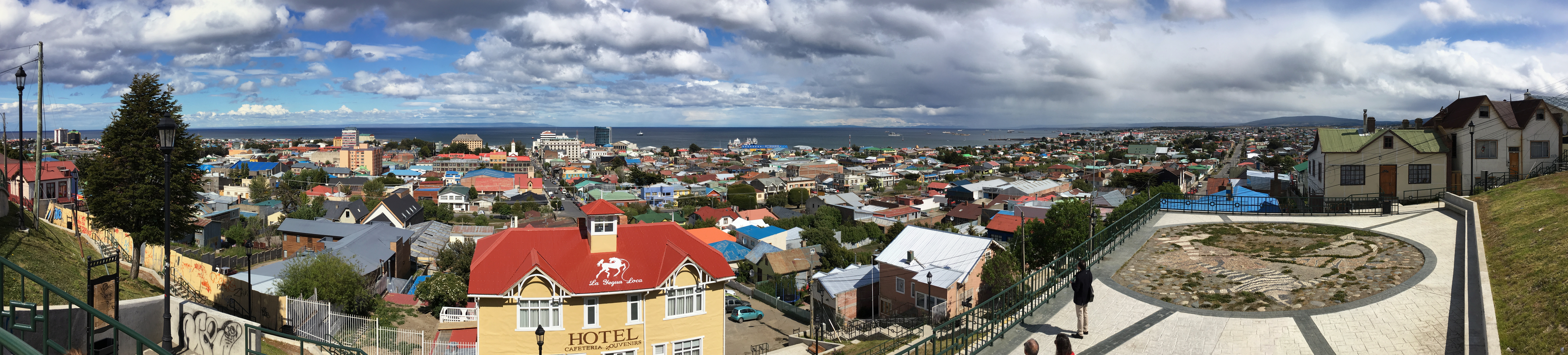
Panoramic view of Punta Arenas, 2016

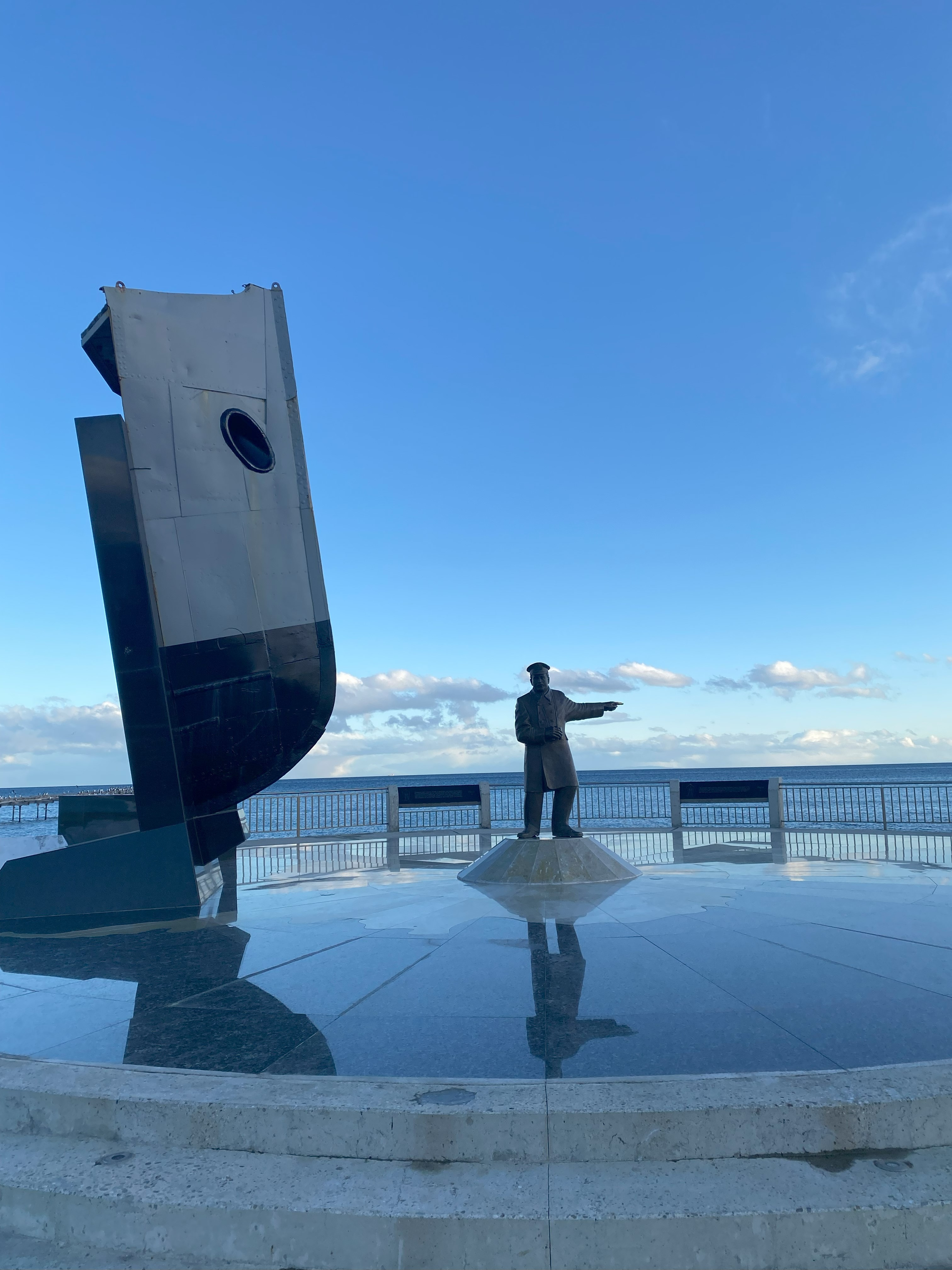
Monument to Piloto Luis Pardo, a Chilean Naval Officer who led the 1916 expedition to save Sir Ernest Shackleton's crew members, stranded on Elephant Island, 2023

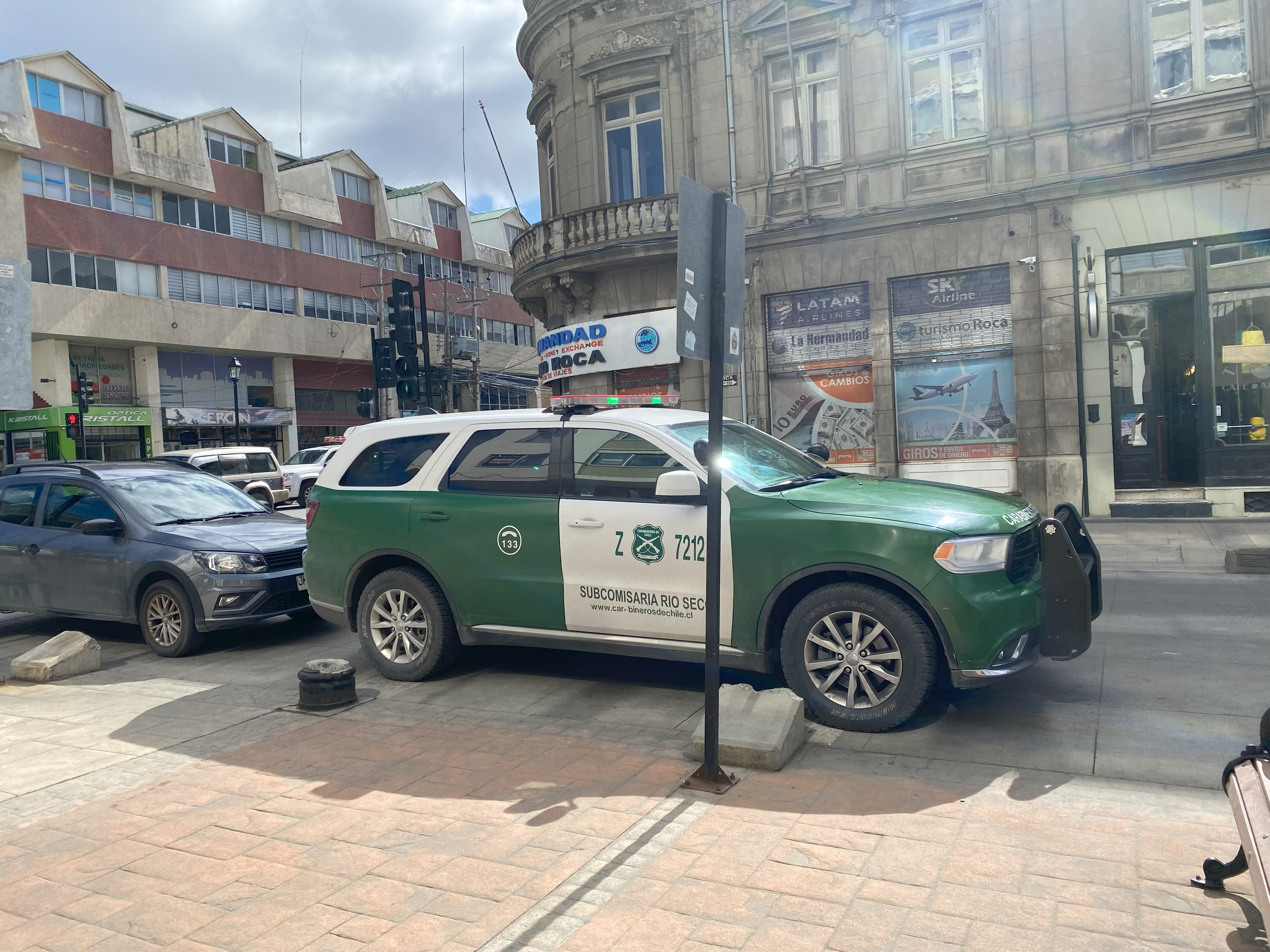
A Carabineros de Chile vehicle parked on Pdte. Julio A. Roca in Punta Arenas, 2023

== Geography ==
Located on the Brunswick Peninsula, Punta Arenas is among the largest cities in Patagonia. In 2012, it had a population of 127,454. It is roughly 1,419 km (882 mi) from the coast of Antarctica and 635 km (395 mi) from Ushuaia, the capital of the Argentine province of Tierra Del Fuego.

The Magallanes region is considered part of Chilean Patagonia. Magallanes is Spanish for Magellan, and was named after Ferdinand Magellan, the Portuguese explorer sailing for Spain. While circumnavigating the Earth for Spain, he passed close to the present site of Punta Arenas in 1520. Early English navigational documents referred to this site as "Sandy Point."

The city proper is located on the north-eastern shore of Brunswick Peninsula. Except for the eastern shore, containing the settlements of Guairabo, Rio Amarillo and Punta San Juan, the peninsula is largely uninhabited. The municipality of Punta Arenas includes all of Brunswick Peninsula, as well as all islands west of the Isla Grande de Tierra del Fuego and north of Cockburn and Magdalena channels.

The largest of those are:

- Santa Inés Island
- Desolación Island
- Dawson Island
- Aracena Island
- Clarence Island
- Carlos Island
- Wickham Island

Except Dawson Island, which had a population of about 301 in 2002, the islands are largely uninhabited. Clarence Island had a population of five.

=== Climate ===
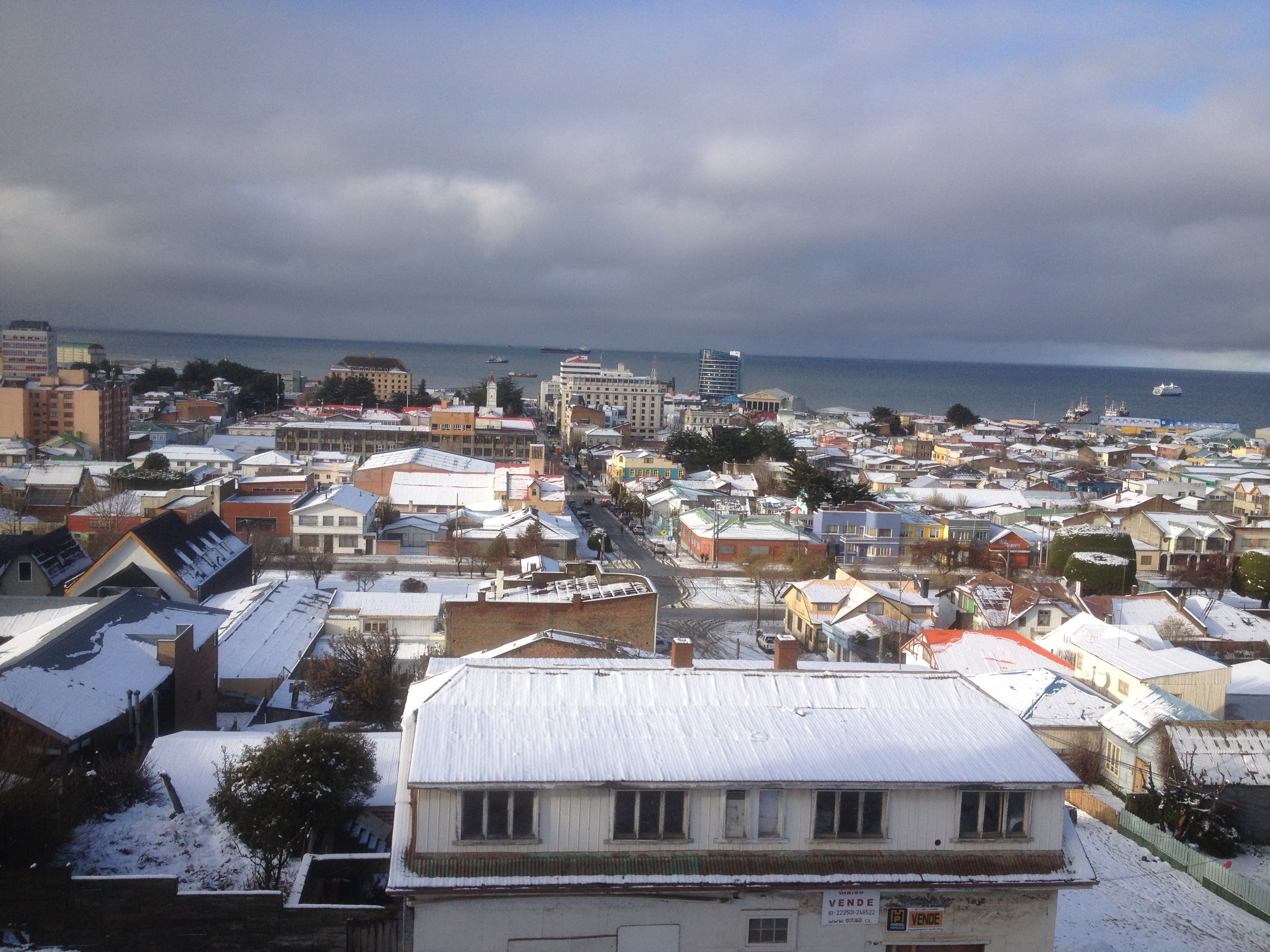
Snow in winter, 2014

Due to its far southern latitude, Punta Arenas has a subpolar oceanic climate (Köppen climate classification Cfc, Trewartha climate classification Eolk). The seasonal temperature in Punta Arenas is greatly moderated by its proximity to the ocean, with average lows in July near −1 °C (30 °F) and highs in January of 14 °C (57 °F).

It is known for stable constant temperatures, which vary only slightly with the seasons. Rainfall is highest in April and May, and the snowy season runs throughout the Chilean winter (June until September). As in most of Patagonia, average annual precipitation is quite low, only 380 mm (15 in), because of a rain shadow created by the Andes. The average temperature does not go below 1 °C (34 °F). The city is also known for its high winds (up to 130 km/h [81 mph]), which are strongest during the summer. City officials have put up ropes between buildings in the downtown area to assist pedestrians with managing the strong downdrafts.

After 1986, Punta Arenas became the first significantly populated city in the world to be affected directly by the thinning ozone layer. Its residents are considered to be exposed to potentially damaging levels of ultraviolet radiation.

Climate data for Punta Arenas (1991–2020, extremes 1888–present)
Month	Jan	Feb	Mar	Apr	May	Jun	Jul	Aug	Sep	Oct	Nov	Dec	Year
Record high °C (°F)	25.0 (77.0)	28.7 (83.7)	26.0 (78.8)	22.5 (72.5)	16.0 (60.8)	16.0 (60.8)	12.0 (53.6)	14.0 (57.2)	19.0 (66.2)	23.5 (74.3)	24.9 (76.8)	27.0 (80.6)	28.7 (83.7)
Mean daily maximum °C (°F)	16.3 (61.3)	16.1 (61.0)	15.4 (59.7)	12.1 (53.8)	8.8 (47.8)	5.5 (41.9)	4.9 (40.8)	7.0 (44.6)	10.2 (50.4)	12.9 (55.2)	14.2 (57.6)	15.2 (59.4)	11.6 (52.9)
Daily mean °C (°F)	10.7 (51.3)	10.3 (50.5)	8.9 (48.0)	6.6 (43.9)	4.2 (39.6)	1.9 (35.4)	1.7 (35.1)	2.7 (36.9)	4.6 (40.3)	6.4 (43.5)	8.3 (46.9)	9.7 (49.5)	6.3 (43.3)
Mean daily minimum °C (°F)	5.9 (42.6)	5.4 (41.7)	3.9 (39.0)	2.2 (36.0)	0.1 (32.2)	−1.5 (29.3)	−1.5 (29.3)	−1.0 (30.2)	0.0 (32.0)	0.6 (33.1)	3.5 (38.3)	4.8 (40.6)	1.9 (35.4)
Record low °C (°F)	−1.0 (30.2)	−2.4 (27.7)	−4.0 (24.8)	−8.4 (16.9)	−10.6 (12.9)	−18.7 (−1.7)	−14.2 (6.4)	−12.0 (10.4)	−9.6 (14.7)	−4.8 (23.4)	−3.0 (26.6)	−1.0 (30.2)	−18.7 (−1.7)
Average precipitation mm (inches)	38.1 (1.50)	31.5 (1.24)	42.9 (1.69)	45.1 (1.78)	36.9 (1.45)	31.3 (1.23)	30.9 (1.22)	29.5 (1.16)	24.5 (0.96)	24.6 (0.97)	23.1 (0.91)	31.8 (1.25)	390.2 (15.36)
Average precipitation days (≥ 1.0 mm)	8.3	7.4	8.4	8.8	7.7	6.7	7.0	7.0	5.7	5.8	6.0	7.5	86.3
Average relative humidity (%)	69	72	75	80	84	86	85	82	77	72	69	69	77
Mean monthly sunshine hours	224.9	187.3	157.4	118.5	95.4	71.7	85.5	118.9	147.0	201.1	216.4	232.5	1,856.6
Source 1: Dirección Meteorológica de Chile
Source 2: NOAA (precipitation days 1991–2020), Méteo Climat (record highs only)

== Demographics ==
Historical population
Year	Pop.	±% p.a.
1930	26,888	—
1940	33,134	+2.11%
1952	38,106	+1.17%
1970	65,836	+3.08%
1982	100,636	+3.60%
1992	113,666	+1.22%
2002	119,496	+0.50%
2017	131,592	+0.64%
2024	132,363	+0.08%
Source: INE, Memoria Chilena

As of the 2024 census, the population is 132,363, of which 49.1% are male and 50.9% are female. People under 15 years old make up 16.4% of the population, and people over 65 years old make up 14.9%. 94.8% of the population is urban and 5.2% is rural.

Punta Arenas is home to the southernmost Hindu temple in the world, which is used by the relatively small, but significant, Sindhi community in Punta Arenas. Sindhi merchants began arriving in the area during the early 1900s, and today constitute one of the largest communities of Indians in Chile.

=== Immigration ===
As of the 2024 census, immigrants make up 6.0% of the population - 5.4% are from South America, 0.4% from North America, 0.1% from Europe, 0.05% from Asia, 0.004% from Africa, and 0.004% from Oceania.

The city was populated by many colonists from Spain and Croatia in the mid-nineteenth century, and many of their descendants remain. Other national ethnic groups represented are German, English, Italian, Swiss and Irish.

Croatian immigration to Punta Arenas was a crucial development in the region of Magallanes and the city in particular. Currently, this influence is still reflected in the names of shops, streets and many buildings. Punta Arenas is said to have the largest percentage of Croatians in the world outside Croatia and the former Yugoslavia.

Punta Arenas also has the largest percentage of residents of British descent in the whole of Chile.

== Administration ==
As a commune, Punta Arenas is a third-level administrative division of Chile administered by a municipal council, headed by a mayor who is directly elected every four years. Since 2016, the mayor has been Claudio Radonich (National Renewal). The 2024-2028 municipal council has the following members:

- Germán Flores Mora (Ind./RN)
- José Becerra Carvajal (Ind./PPD)
- Jorge Risco Navarro (PS)
- Dalivor Eterovic Díaz (PC)
- Jonathan Cárcamo Gómez (FA)
- Marcela Leichtle Martínez (REP)
- Carla Jiménez Soto (REP)
- Alicia Stipicic Mackenney (RN)

Within the electoral divisions of Chile, Punta Arenas is represented in the Chamber of Deputies by Sandra Amar (UDI), Karim Bianchi (IND-PRSD) and Gabriel Boric (CS) as part of the 60th electoral district, which includes the entire Magallanes and Antartica Chilena Region. The commune is represented in the Senate by Carlos Bianchi Chelech (Ind.) and Carolina Goic B. (DC) as part of the 19th senatorial constituency (Magallanes Region).

== Culture ==
=== Museums ===
- Braun Menéndez Regional Museum (Spanish: Museo Regional Braun Menéndez)

The museum is located in the Braun Menéndez Palace, which is a National Monument. Since February 1983, the "Magallanes Regional Museum" has been operating here, which has material from the contemporary history of the region.

- Salesian Regional Museum Maggiorino Borgatello (Spanish: Museo Regional Salesiano Maggiorino Borgatello)

The museum is located at Avenida Bulnes no. 374, next to the Santuario María Auxiliadora. It is the most important in the area, and has a complete collection of species from the region and the Selkʼnam culture. Samples from Antarctica are also on display. It was created in 1893 by the Salesians religious congregation, and is maintained by voluntary contributions made by the community.

- Naval and Maritime Museum of Punta Arenas (Spanish: Museo Naval y Marítimo de Punta Arenas)

The museum is located at Pedro Montt No. 981, next to the Military Museum. It holds a historical collection of the Chilean Armed Forces during the colonization of the territory of Magallanes and Chilean Antarctica.

- Nao Victoria Museum (Spanish: Museo Nao Victoria)

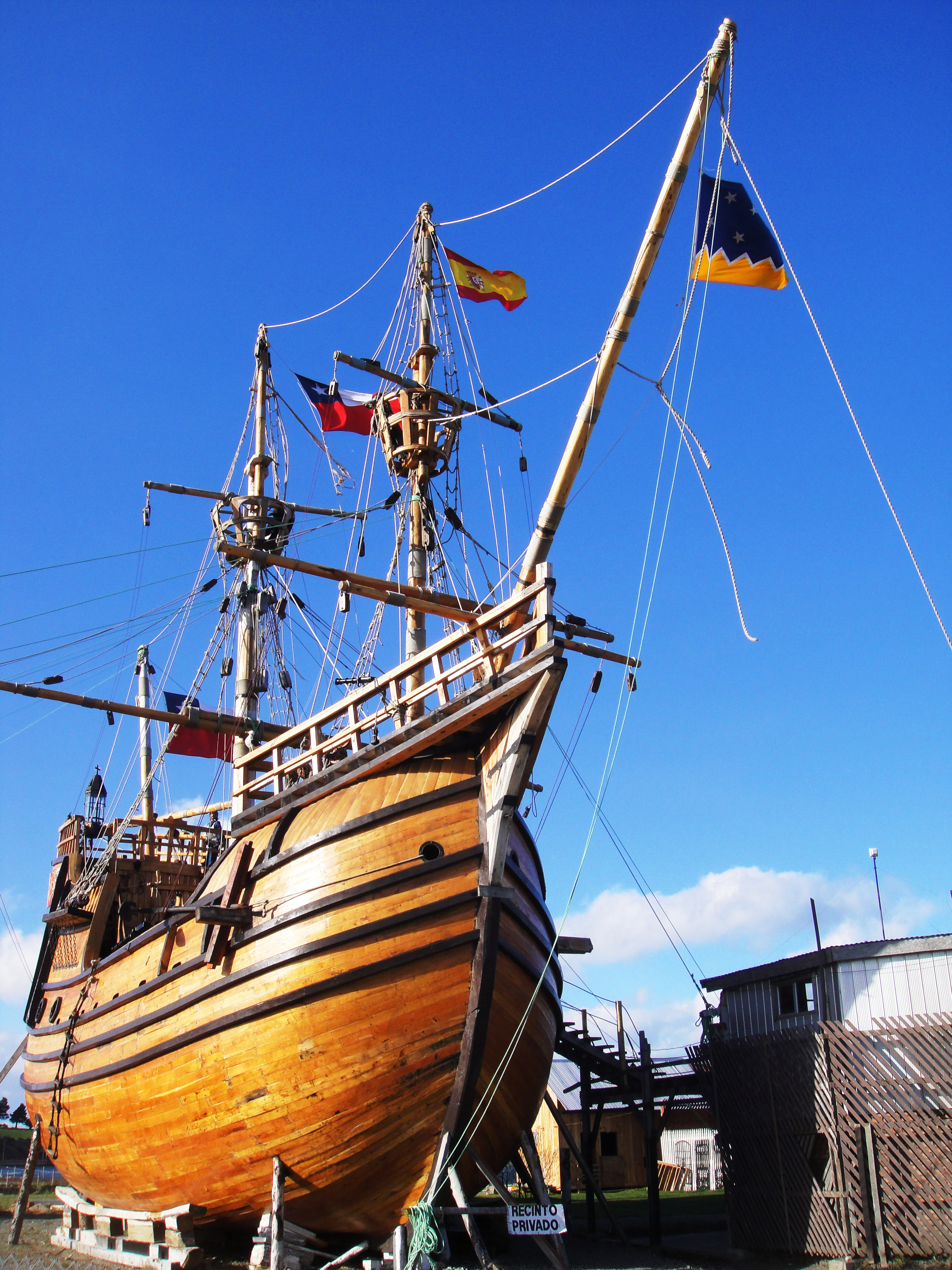
Nao Victoria, Magellan's ship replica, in the Museo Nao Victoria Punta Arenas, 2011

The museum is located 7.5 km north on Route Y-565 to Rio Seco. This museum exhibits a full-size replica of the first ship ever to circumnavigate the world: Ferdinand Magellan's Nao Victoria. Since October 2011, the museum has displayed a full-size replica of the James Caird, used by Ernest Shackleton during his Imperial Trans-Antarctic Expedition with the Endurance.

- Museum of Remembrance (Spanish: Museo del Recuerdo)

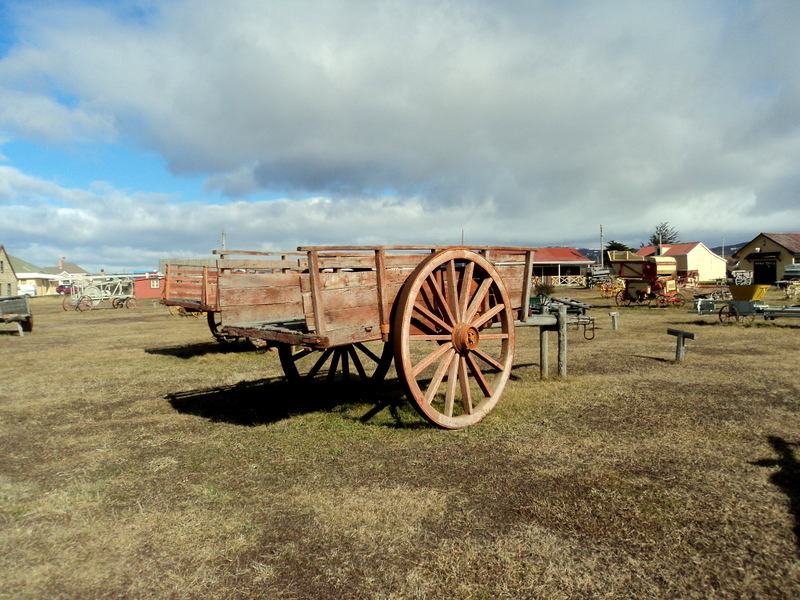
Museum of Remembrance, 2010

The Museum of Remembrance of the University of Magallanes Instituto de la Patagonia displays examples of heritage buildings, old machinery and tools. They are part of an Open Museum, with high attendance and regional identity and a significant number of foreign visitors, especially during the spring, summer and autumn seasons. It has 8 heritage wooden buildings; 40 antique vehicles and transport of great historical value; machines; and innumerable tools, mainly associated with livestock and oil production.

== Economy ==
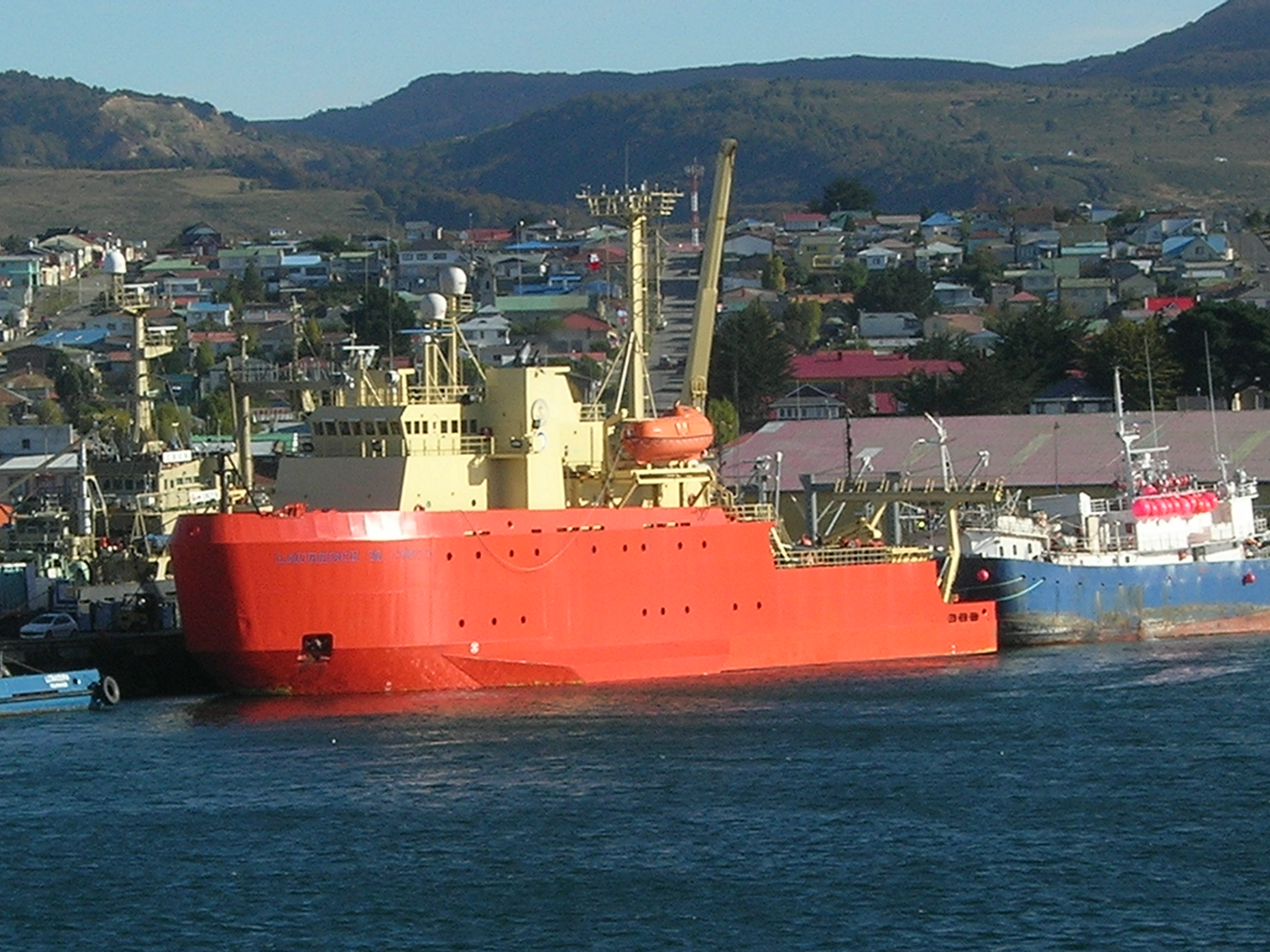
Ice breaker RV Laurence M. Gould in Punta Arenas. Punta Arenas is an important point in the supply of Antarctic bases in West Antarctica, 2006

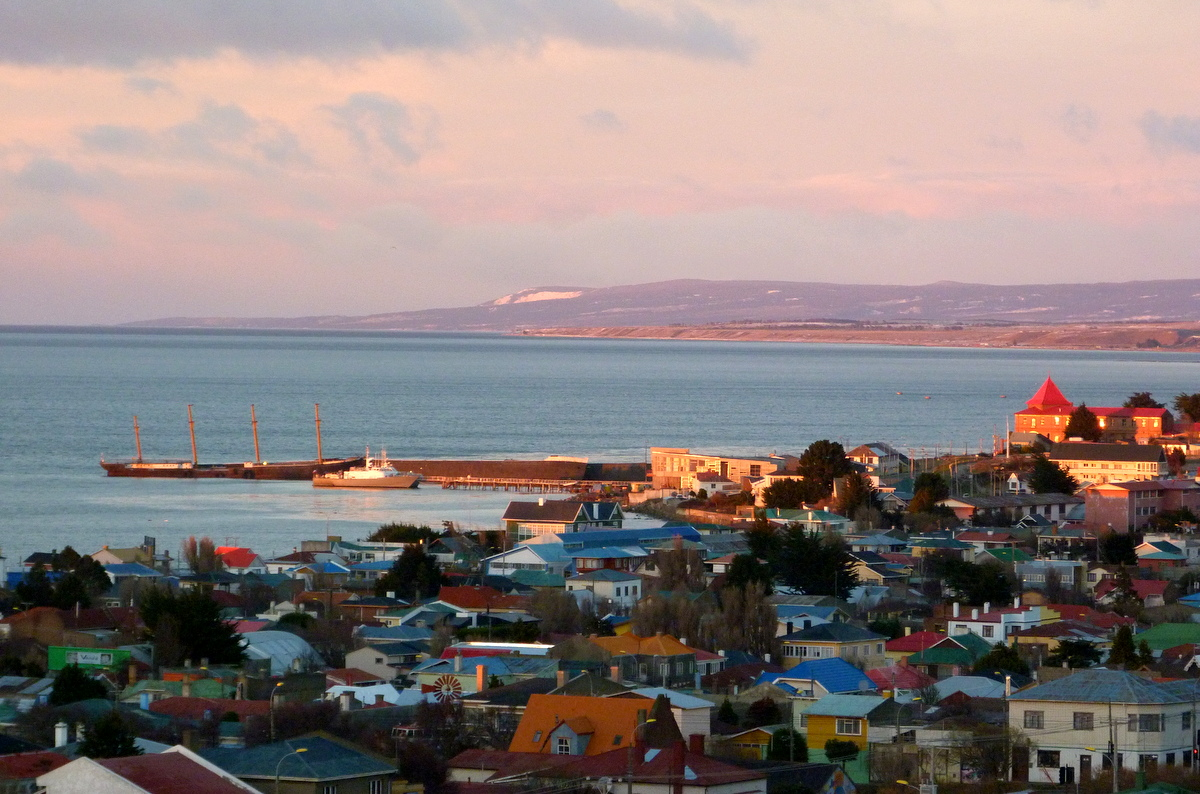
The County of Peebles and Cavenga are used as a breakwater for the harbour at Punta Arenas, 2023

By 2006 the economy of Punta Arenas and the region had diversified. Chile's principal oil reserves are close by, along with some low-grade coal.

Agricultural production, including sheep and cattle, continues to play a significant role.

Tourism has contributed to the city's economy and steady growth. Tourist destinations include the Cathedral and other notable churches, the city cemetery, and the statue of Magellan. Some cruise ships to Antarctica depart from Punta Arenas's port, which also serves as a hub for many cruise lines that travel along the channels and fjords of the region.

A scheduled ferry service connects Punta Arenas with the main island of Tierra del Fuego, and a less frequent ferry runs to the Chilean town of Puerto Williams.

In 2026, entrepreneurs from the Magallanes region and the Falkland Islands held meetings in Punta Arenas to restore business ties between the city and the islands, with plans to develop a maritime supply route. The mayor of Punta Arenas expects the city to become a major supply hub for the islands.

== Transport ==
Map of the Punta Arenas commune in Magallanes Region

Carlos Ibáñez del Campo airport is located 20 kilometers from the city centre. Rental car services, duty-free shops and custom office services are available in the building (there is no duty-free shop in the terminal, despite the representations of tourist literature). Airlines serving the airport include LATAM Chile and Sky Airline, as well as charter flights. The civilian airport and the military airport make up the larger complex.

The city has sea, land, and air connections. By road, a connection to other regions of Chile requires passing through Argentine territory. By sea, several cruises and ferries can take visitors to the city, although the costs are higher because they include stops at tourist sites along the route.

== Education ==
University of Magallanes (UMAG) is in the southern Chilean city of Punta Arenas. It is part of the Chilean Traditional Universities. The University of Magallanes was established in 1981 during the neoliberal reforms of Chile's military regime as the successor of Universidad Técnica del Estado's Punta Arenas section. Universidad Técnica del Estado had established the Punta Arenas section in 1961.

The University of Magallanes has campuses in Punta Arenas and Puerto Natales as well as a university centre in Puerto Williams. University of Magallanes publishes the humanities and social sciences journal Magallania twice a year.

There is a German school, Deutsche Schule Punta Arenas.

== International relations ==
The city of Punta Arenas hosts a number of international relations institutions, such as the Regional Unit of International Affairs (URAI) of the Regional Government of Magallanes and Chilean Antarctica, responsible for analyzing and managing the region's bilateral and multilateral relations with Latin America and the rest of the world; the Tourism and International Relations Commission of the Regional Council of Magallanes and Chilean Antarctica; the regional office of the National Migration Service; the regional office of the General Directorate for Export Promotion (ProChile); and the Department of Migration and International Police of the Investigations Police. In the field of higher education internationalization, the main actor in Punta Arenas is the Directorate of International Relations of the University of Magallanes.

=== Consulates ===
- Argentina (Consulate General)
- Belgium (Honorary Consulate)
- Brazil (Honorary Consulate)
- Bulgaria (Honorary Consulate)
- Croatia (Honorary Consulate)
- Finland (Honorary Consulate)
- France (Honorary Consulate)
- Germany (Honorary Consulate)
- Hungary (Honorary Consulate)
- Italy (Honorary Vice-Consulate)
- Netherlands (Honorary Consulate)
- Norway (Honorary Consulate)
- Paraguay (Honorary Consulate)
- Spain (Honorary Vice-Consulate)
- United Kingdom (Honorary Consulate)
- Uruguay (Honorary Consulate)

=== Twin towns – sister cities ===
Punta Arenas is twinned with:

- Bellingham, United States
- Harbin, China
- Río Gallegos, Argentina
- Ushuaia, Argentina.

== Notable people ==
- Gabriel Boric (born 1986), President of Chile (2022–2026)
- Sara Braun (1862–1955), businesswoman
- María Teresa Castañón (born 1978), politician
- Ana Delfosse (1931–2017), Argentine racing driver and Formula One mechanic
- Marina Latorre (born 1925), writer, journalist and gallerist
- Juan Marino Cabello (1920–2007), composer, writer, screenwriter, bandleader and lyricist
- Mateo Martinic (born 1931), historian and writer
- Mariana Cox Méndez (1871–1914), writer, feminist
- Julio Milostich (born 1966), actor
- Diego Ibáñez (born 1989), politician, lawyer and environmental activist
- Mario Galindo (born 1951), former footballer

== See also ==
- 1949 Tierra del Fuego earthquake
- Croatian Chileans
- Immigration to Chile
- Southernmost settlements
