= Rice Center for Neuroengineering =

US research laboratory at Rice University

- Established: 2014
- Mission: "Provide an environment that will foster collaboration between researchers, scientists, doctors and clinicians—and ultimately maximize research impact by working across traditional boundaries."
- Owner: Rice University
- Location: Houston, Texas, United States
- Website: neuroengineering.rice.edu

The Rice Center for Neuroengineering is an interdisciplinary research center, founded in 2014, housed within Rice University's Department of Electrical and Computer Engineering. The center is funded by an NSF IGERT grant, DARPA, the W.M. Keck Foundation, and Texas Instruments. Partner Institutions include Rice University, Baylor College of Medicine, the University of Texas Health Science Center, and the Gulf Coast Consortia. Facilities are located on the Rice University campus and in the Texas Medical Center.

The center's research centers on the fundamental understanding of coding and computation in the human brain, as well as developing technology to treat and diagnose neural disease. Individual faculty research includes integrating neural circuits at the cellular level, analyzing neuronal data in real-time, and manipulating healthy or diseased neural circuit activity and connectivity using nano electronics, optics, and emerging photonics technologies.

The center's mission is to "provide an environment that will foster collaboration between researchers, scientists, doctors and clinicians—and ultimately maximize research impact by working across traditional boundaries."

== Notable faculty ==
The center's faculty include medical doctors, electrical and computer engineers, computer scientists, bioengineers, and neural scientists and engineers. Among notable members of the faculty are:

- Behnaam Aazhang, Rice University
- Richard Baraniuk, Rice University
- David Eagleman, Baylor College of Medicine
- Naomi Halas, Rice University
