= Naming law =

Legal restriction

A naming law restricts the names that parents can legally give to their children, usually to protect the child from being given an offensive or embarrassing name. Many countries around the world have such laws, with most governing the meaning of the name, while some only govern the scripts in which it is written.

== Australia ==
In Australia, naming laws are governed by the states and territories which may have differing restrictions. Most states prohibit names that are too long, include unpronounceable symbols such as !, @ or # (apart from hyphens between names), that include official titles or are otherwise obscene or offensive. In 2017 a list of purportedly prohibited names was leaked from the Victorian register of Births, Deaths and Marriages some examples of which are below:

- Anzac
- Australia
- Chief
- Christ
- Commodore
- Constable
- Emperor
- General
- God
- Judge
- Justice
- King
- Lady
- Messiah
- Minister
- Prime Minister
- Saint
- Satan
- Seaman

Some examples of names banned nationally are:

- Admiral
- Anzac
- Australia
- Baron
- Bishop
- Bonghead
- Brigadier
- Brother
- Cadet
- Captain
- Chief
- Chow Tow
- Christ
- Commodore
- Constable
- Corporal
- Cyanide
- Dame
- Dickhead
- Duke
- Emperor
- Father
- G-Bang
- General
- God
- Honour
- Ikea
- iMac
- Judge
- Justice
- King
- Lady
- Lieutenant
- Lord
- Madam
- Majesty
- Major
- Marijuana
- Medicare
- Messiah
- Minister
- Mister
- Monkey
- Ned Kelly
- Nutella
- Officer
- Panties
- Premier
- President
- Prime Minister
- Prince
- Princess
- Queen
- Ranga
- Robocop
- Saint
- Satan
- Scrotum
- Seaman
- Sergeant
- Shithead
- Sir
- Sister
- Smelly
- Snort
- Spongebob
- Thong
- Virgin

== Austria ==
First names that are uncommon or detrimental to the child's welfare must not be registered. Additionally, at least the first name of the child must correspond to the child's gender.

== Azerbaijan ==
Over 200 names have been proscribed by Azerbaijan as of 2015, including "the names of persons who have perpetrated aggression against the people of Azerbaijan" (including names seen as "Armenian") and "names whose meaning is offensive in the Azerbaijani language".

== Canada ==
Naming laws vary from province to province. In British Columbia, the Vital Statistics Act requires the registrar general to reject a proposed name or an amendment to an existing name if the name "might reasonably be expected to cause (i) mistake or confusion, or embarrassment to the child or another person, is sought for an improper purpose, or is, on any other ground, objectionable".

== China ==
In Imperial China, a naming taboo prevented people from using the same names as the reigning emperor.

== Denmark ==
Under the Law on Personal Names, first names are picked from a list of approved names (18,000 female names and 15,000 male names as of 1 January 2016). One can also apply to Ankestyrelsen for approval of new names, e.g. common first names from other countries. Names cannot have surname character, and must follow Danish orthography (e.g. Cammmilla with three m's is not allowed).

== Finland ==
The Names Act of 1985 requires that all Finnish citizens and residents have at least one and at the most four first names. Persons who do not have a first name are obligated to adopt one when they are entered into the Finnish national population database. Parents of new-born children must name their child and inform the population registry within two months of the child's birth. The name may be chosen freely, but it must not be:

- A name used primarily by persons of the other sex
- A name foreign to the naming tradition in Finland
- A surname, except a patronymic as last given name
- A name already used by a sibling, if this is to be the only given name.

Waivers may be granted if valid family, religious or ethnic reasons give grounds to use a name contrary to these principles. Persons may change their first names once without a specific reason. For subsequent changes, valid reasons must be presented.

== France ==
Since 1993 the choice has been free in France unless it is decided that the name is contrary to the interests of the child. Before that time the choice of first names was dictated by French laws that decreed which names were acceptable. Napoleon Bonaparte created the law.

== Germany ==
Names have to be approved by the local registration office, called Standesamt, which generally consults a list of first names and foreign embassies for foreign names. The name cannot be a last name or a product, and it cannot negatively affect the child. If the name submitted is denied, it can be appealed; otherwise a new name has to be submitted. A fee is charged for each submission.

Umlauts (ä, ö, ü) and/or the letter ß in family names are recognized as an important reason for a name change. (Even just the change of the spelling, e.g. from Müller to Mueller or from Weiß to Weiss, is regarded as name change. In German ID cards and passports, however, such names are spelled in two different ways: the correct way in the non-machine-readable zone of the document [Müller] and transcribed [Mueller] in the machine-readable zone of the document, so persons unfamiliar with German orthography may get the impression that the document is a forgery. German credit cards may use the correct or the transcribed spelling only. It is recommended to use the exactly same spelling in the machine-readable zone of the passport for airline tickets, visas, etc. and to refer to this zone if being asked questions.) Internationally and by many electronic systems, ä / ö / ü are transcribed as ae / oe / ue, and ß is transcribed as ss.

During the Nazi period, Germany had a list of approved names to choose from that was passed on 5 January 1938 as the "Second Regulation under the law re The changing of Family and Given names." The law had one list of names for ethnic Germans and another for Jews.

== Hungary ==
A child's name must be chosen from a list of pre-approved names. If the intended name is not on the list, the parents need to apply for approval. Applications are considered by the Research Institute for Linguistics of the Hungarian Academy of Sciences following a set of principles. Children born to a foreign citizen may have their name chosen according to foreign law.

== Iceland ==
Parents are limited to choosing children's names from the Personal Names Register (Mannanafnaskrá), which as of 2023 contained about 4,300 names. Since 2019 given names are no longer restricted by gender. The Icelandic Naming Committee maintains the list and hears requests for exceptions.

== India ==
The government of Rajasthan launched the Meaningful Names Campaign (Saarthak Naam Abhiyan) in 2026 to correct the official usage of “inappropriate, unclear, or negative” names in schools (including diminutives, derogatory terms, and those based on caste) to combat feelings of inferiority. Parents of young students and older students with banned names were given the opportunity to select from a list of approved “respectful” alternatives.

== Indonesia ==
Legal naming in Indonesia currently follows Regulation no. 73 of 2022 about Recording of Names on Residence Document, which requires names to be written in the Latin script, not to be mononymous (i.e. they must consist of at least two words), and to have no more than 60 characters, including spaces, a small increase from the previous limit of 55. Names are also forbidden which are hard to read, have negative or multiple meanings, are abbreviated or contain numbers, symbols or references to academic degrees. People born before 2022 who have mononyms or overly long names are exempted via the grandfather clause principle, thenceforth allowed to keep their names.

Before that year, there was no nationwide regulation or any other kind of legal restriction on personal names in Indonesia, which effectively allowed for the emergence of various unusual names (for example, at least six people have single-character names, such as "." and "N", and there was once a 132-character-long name, the longest one ever to be born in Indonesia). Still, at the local level, the government of Karanganyar attempted to regulate naming by introducing a ban in 2019 upon those names it deemed to be of Western origins, sparking criticism from several representatives.

== Iran ==
There are many regulations regarding personal names in the Islamic Republic of Iran: names must not insult the Islamic religion or public morality, and they must not be associated with the opposite sex; converts to Islam may change their name for religious reasons—however, changing Islamic names is prohibited; a person can request that the potentially shaming component Abd (meaning servant) be removed from their name; additional (or extra) names may also be omitted on official documents.

== Ireland ==
Registration of births in the Republic of Ireland requires specifying one surname and one or more forenames. There are no laws restricting forenames, although if a registrar thinks a name "obscene, blasphemous, or otherwise inappropriate", they will advise the parents and may require them to sign a statement confirming they have been so advised. Registration can accommodate names with Latin diacritics: both Irish-language names with the síneadh fada (Irish accented vowels: á é í ó ú) and others such as Björn, João, or Maitê.

== Israel ==
According to the (current) 1956 Israeli name law, a person should have a first name (more than one is permitted) and surname (a double-barrelled name is permitted). Children receive the surname of their married parents or the surname of their father if the surnames of their parents differ one from another. If their parents were not married or have a common-law marriage, children receive the surname of their mother unless both parents agreed to give them a double surname. Names can be double if there was no agreement about it between both parents who at least have a common-law marriage. If the parents do not have a common-law marriage children receive the surname of their mother only.

It is permitted to change one's name or surname once in seven years, or even earlier provided the Ministry of Interior agrees. In accordance with section no. 16, the Ministry may reject a name or surname if the possibility exists that the name is deceptive or that may be an offense to public policy and the public sentiment. While there is not a formal list of banned names, it is highly likely that offensive names like "Hazir" (חזיר = pig) or "Hitler" will be rejected according to this section.

In the case of adoption a child receives the adoptive parents' surname but keeps the original first name.

In accordance with section no. 9, in the rare case of a nameless person, the Minister of Interior chooses the name in accordance with names of person's parents, grandparents, or the spouse in the case of marriage. However, the person can change this name within two months of the announcement.

The father's name is provided by the mother of the person until the age of 16, or by the individuals themselves if they are above age 16.

== Italy ==
Names considered ridiculous or shameful are banned by law.

== Japan ==
Similar to China, Japan has a certain set of characters that cannot be used in a child's name.

== Kyrgyzstan ==
Some Kyrgyz have been Russifying their names, which had a bill proposed on the 4th of March, 2015, that sought to ban the practice. The bill ultimately did not pass; instead, Kyrgyzstan citizens are since 2025 allowed to voluntarily drop suffixes of Russian origin from their surnames.

== Malaysia ==
In 2006 as well as thereafter, the National Registration Department of Malaysia (JPN) may decline to register objectionable or undesirable names, including names based on titles, numbers, colors, vegetables, fruits, vulgarities, or equipment. Parents who wish to register such names despite JPN objection must make a statutory declaration to that effect.

== Namibia ==
In 2014, Deputy Foreign Affairs Minister Peya Mushelenga proposed banning offensive babynames, such as the Oshiwambo names Mwalengwa ('Shame-on-you'), Ndalipo ('I-was-there') and Mwaningasheninoonyoko (lit. 'What-you-did-to your-mothers'), which, according to Mushelenga, would be for the most part given by vengeful fathers.

== New Zealand ==
Under the Births, Deaths and Marriages Registration Act of 1995, a name is not allowed when it "might cause offence to a reasonable person; or [...] is unreasonably long; or without adequate justification, [...] is, includes, or resembles, an official title or rank". This is determined by the Department of Internal Affairs, which is responsible for registering names at birth. The most commonly rejected name is "Justice", which is a formal title for judges in New Zealand. Below is a list of names banned in the country:

- *
- 4Real
- 89
- Anal
- Bishop
- Constable
- H-Q
- II
- III
- Judge
- Justice
- Justus
- King
- Knight
- Lucifer
- Mafia No Fear
- Minister
- Mr
- Prince
- Queen Victoria
- Royale
- Saint
- Sex Fruit
- Talula Does The Hula From Hawaii

== Norway ==
Names are regulated by the Norwegian Names Act of 2002. Parents may not choose a first name for their child that may become a significant disadvantage for the child. A citizen may change their family name to any common family name, i.e. any name shared by more than 200 Norwegians. In order to change to a rare family name, permission from every citizen with the name is required. Exceptions to the restrictions on taking a protected surname can be made if you have "a connection to the name", for example through kinship (family name held by a parent, step-parent or foster-parent, grandparent, great grandparent or great great grandparent), by marriage, cohabitation where you have lived together for at least two years or have children together, or through adoption.

In April 2009, a six-year-old Norwegian boy named Christer pressed his parents to send a letter to King Harald V to approve his name being changed to "Sonic X". They allowed Christer to write it himself but did not send it until he badgered them further, and the king responded that he could not approve the change because Christer was not eighteen years old.

== Portugal ==
Portugal has an exhaustive list of approved names published periodically by the Institute of Registration at the Ministry of Justice.

== Saudi Arabia ==
There is a list of 50 names that are banned in Saudi Arabia. Western names Alice, Elaine and Linda, as well as names of Jewish or Israeli origin (such as both Benjamin and Ben), are among the blacklisted names.

== Sweden ==
The older Names Act of 1982 states that Swedish first names "shall not be approved if they can cause offense or can be supposed to cause discomfort for the one using it, or names which for some obvious reason are not suitable as a first name." The newer namelaw (Swedish: lag om personnamn, lit. 'Personal Names Act') still states it in that same manner.

== Spain ==
In Spain, people have freedom to choose any name as long as the name does not make identification confusing, is not the same name as one of their living siblings, and does not offend the person who is named.

== Tajikistan ==
The authorities of Tajikistan have announced the preparation of a list of 3,000 pre-approved names, all referred to Tajik culture, thus banning Arabo-Islamic names, and nominal suffixes deemed divisive.

Among increasingly religious Tajiks, names of Arabic or Islamic origin have become more popular over native Tajik names.

The Tajik government, in its campaign to rid the land of Islamic influences, has used the word "prostitute" to label hijab-wearing women and enforced shaving of beards, in addition to considering outlawing Arabo-Islamic names for newborns and legally (en)forcing the usage of Tajik names among the populace. Tajikistan President Rakhmon (also spelt Rahmon) has said that the Persian epic Shahnameh should be used as a source for names, with his proposed law hinting that Muslim names would be forbidden after his antihijab and antibeard laws.

== United Kingdom ==
The UK has no law restricting names, but names that contain obscenities, numerals, misleading titles, or are impossible to pronounce are likely to be rejected by the Registering Officer when registering a child.

There are no restrictions on adults assuming any new name, unless the purpose of the name change is fraudulent or for other illegal purposes.

If, however, someone wanted a legal document that proves a change of name, or to put their name change on the record through the High Court, they would have to make an enrolled deed poll, with which any part of the name can be changed or removed, including hyphens and punctuation, but excluding capitalisation. The new name must also be pronounceable, not include symbols, numbers or punctuation (exceptions are made for hyphenated names or established names, e.g. O'Connor), and must not be "offensive or against the public interest" (e.g., adding Ltd. to the end of the name).

== United States ==
Restrictions vary by state, and most are imposed for the sake of practicality. For example, several states limit the number of characters in a name, due to limitations in the software used for official record keeping. For similar reasons, some states ban the use of numerals or pictograms. A few states ban the use of obscenities. Conversely, a few states, such as Kentucky, have no naming laws whatsoever. Courts have interpreted the Due Process Clause of the Fourteenth Amendment to the United States Constitution and the Free Speech Clause of the First Amendment as generally supporting the traditional parental right to choose their children's names.

One practice that some have found restrictive was California's practice of not recording names with diacritical marks, such as in the name José. The Office of Vital Records in the California Department of Public Health does not require that names containing other than the 26 alphabetical characters of the English language be accepted. In 2017, the California legislature passed bill AB-82, which would have required the State Registrar to allow names containing diacritical marks to be recorded. However, Governor Jerry Brown vetoed the bill on the ground that mandating the use of diacritical marks on some state and local vital records without a corresponding requirement for all state and federal government records would create inconsistencies and require significant state funds to replace or modify existing registration systems.

== Russia ==
In Russia, the usage of any offensive words or rank references in names is prohibited, as well as any numbers or symbols, with the exception of the hyphen.

== Zaire ==
Zairians were urged to drop their Western or Christian names in favor of Zairian names as part of Authenticité, a state ideology created by the Zairian autocratic president then-named Joseph-Désiré Mobutu, who set an ideological example by changing his French name to the all-African name Mobutu Sese Seko Kuku Ngbendu Wa Za Banga, more commonly abbreviated to Mobutu Sese Seko for the sake of simplicity.

== See also ==
- Surname law
- Deadnaming
