= Deadnaming =

Referring to a transgender person by their former name

Deadnaming is a form of misgendering, being the act of calling or referring to a transgender or non-binary person by a former forename which they have rejected (considered to be dead to them) on the basis that it reflects a former gender identity following gender transition.

Deadnaming risks causing offense and harm to the subject, including the potential to out them as transgender to people who were previously unaware. Intentional acts may seek to deny or invalidate a person's gender identity.

== Background ==
In many cultures, given names are considered either masculine (e.g. John), feminine (e.g. Jane), or unisex (e.g. Jamie), and chosen according to an infant's assigned sex at birth. Transgender people have a gender identity which differs from their assigned sex, and thus, may choose to go by a different name. In the 2010s, transgender activists popularized the term deadname to refer to such a former name. The Oxford English Dictionary attests the use of deadname on Twitter in 2010, and deadnaming in 2013. The term generally carries a negative connotation, with the implication that referring to a transgender person by their former name is unacceptable.

Like other forms of misgendering, deadnaming can be a form of overt aggression or a microaggression, indicating that the target is not fully accepted as a member of society. Transgender activists consider the deadnaming of homicide victims and high-profile celebrities by news media to be a violation of privacy, and a contributing factor to transphobia.

Journalistic style guides, health-practitioner manuals, and LGBTQ advocacy groups advise adopting transgender people's names and pronouns, even when referring to them in the past, prior to transitioning. A 2021 survey by The Trevor Project found a lower rate of suicide attempts from trans and nonbinary youth who had their name or gender marker changed on birth certificates, driver's licenses, or other legal documents.

Queer scholar Lucas Crawford has theorized that some transgender people insist on preventing deadnaming in part as a strategy of prospective self-assertion: "by insisting on the primacy of the present, by seeking to erase the past, or even by emotionally locating their 'real self' in the future, that elusive place where access (to transition, health care, housing, a livable wage, and so on) and social viability tend to appear more abundant." Correcting deadnaming by third parties is cited as a way to support trans people.

== Obstacles to name changes ==
Trans people who wish to avoid being deadnamed can sometimes face significant bureaucratic and administrative obstacles. Legally changing names requires time, money, and effort. Changing corresponding information — for example, names, emails, and schedules for schools or employers — can also be difficult.

=== Academic metadata ===
For people with academic publications, metadata containing a deadname (such as a byline on a news article, or a published book with an ISBN), can be difficult or impossible to change. Some academic publishers and scientific journal publishers have taken up policies which allow trans authors to modify their metadata. Oftentimes trans authors may resort to republishing their work as new editions while attempting to remove the previous ones from circulation. Some web platforms may still portray their deadname as the primary author and edition.

Journalist and University of California researcher Theresa Tanenbaum reported frustration with attempting to update the 83 publications attributed to her deadname, with many publishers ignoring or refusing her request. In 2021, Berkeley Lab led an effort to simplify name changes for published researchers, which saw agreement from many national laboratories and scientific publishers.

=== Film and television ===
In 2019, IMDb faced criticism from SAG-AFTRA, the National LGBTQ Task Force and GLAAD over its refusal to remove actors' birth names. In response, the site changed its policy to allow removing a name "if [it] is not broadly publicly known"; on film credits, and the display of their previous name in parentheses next to their current name. GLAAD spokesperson Nick Adams called the change a "step in the right direction" but "imperfect", and that trans people with credits under their deadname "will still be affected by IMDb's determination to publish outdated information".

On December 1, 2020, the same day actor Elliot Page came out as a trans man, Netflix began updating metadata for films Page previously appeared in. PopSugar writer Grayson Gilcrease noted that this was the first time Netflix had made such a change, and speculated that it was due to Page's popularity in The Umbrella Academy; she contrasted this with trans actress Josie Totah, who at the time was still credited under her deadname for her role in Champions.

== Similar use in cisgender individuals ==
The rejection of a "dead" name has also been used by some individuals who are not transgender. LAist has argued that laws protecting transgender individuals' name changes would also benefit cisgender individuals, citing a case where a student was unable to have her maiden name printed on her diploma when she was in an abusive relationship with her former spouse.

== Corporate and political responses ==
Some web platforms such as Facebook, YouTube, and Gmail allow a certain number of name changes per user profile, allowing for any number of reasons for a name to be changed.

In 2013, the English Wikipedia elicited media coverage over its response to Chelsea Manning's public transition. The article about Manning was initially quickly renamed, but a protracted dispute ensued; the matter was ultimately taken up by the site's Arbitration Committee, which imposed sanctions on editors espousing transphobia, but also on those making accusations of transphobia. Wikimedia Foundation executive Sue Gardner expressed disappointment over the handling of Wikipedia's response.

In late June 2021, the website Fandom announced new LGBTQ guidelines across its websites in addition to the existing terms of use policy that prohibits deadnaming transgender people across their websites. The guidelines include links to queer-inclusive and trans support resources, and further guidelines were released in September 2021, related to addressing gender identity.

In November 2022, following its acquisition by Elon Musk, Twitter reinstated the account of Jordan Peterson, who Twitter had previously suspended for a tweet deadnaming Elliot Page, and The Babylon Bee, which was suspended for a tweet misgendering U.S. Assistant Secretary for Health Rachel Levine. In April 2023, Twitter removed deadnaming from its hateful content guidelines.

== See also ==
- Anti-LGBTQ rhetoric
- Lavender linguistics
- LGBTQ rights in the United States
- Naming ceremony
- Naming law
- Birth name
