= Biblioteca de México José Vasconcelos =

Coordinates: 19.4287°N 99.1496°W

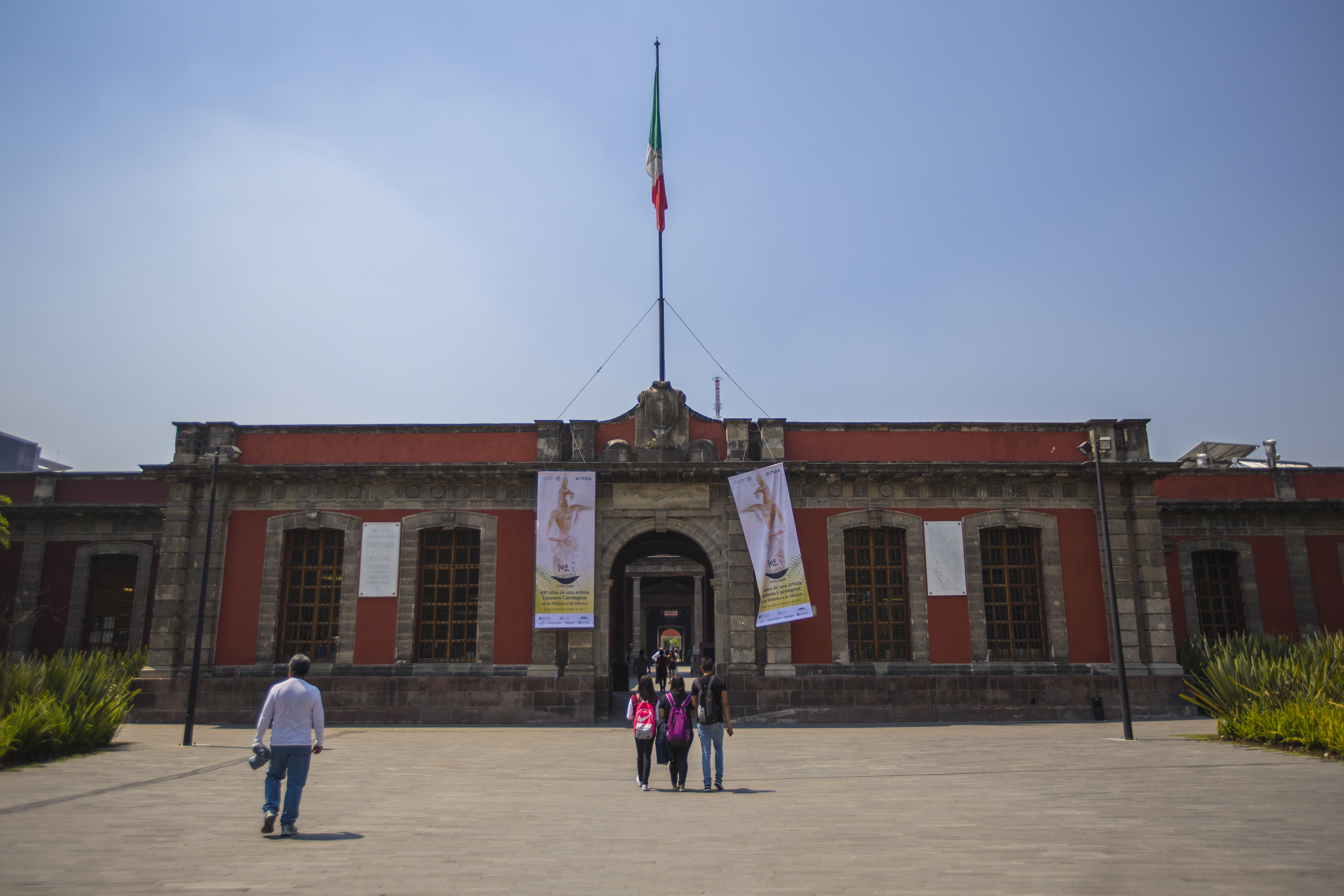
The entrance in 2017

The Biblioteca de México José Vasconcelos is a public library in Centro, Mexico City across from the Balderas metro station. It is open to the public daily 8:30 am–7:30 pm.

== History ==
=== Building ===
The building was built at the end of the 18th century to house the Royal Tobacco Factory of New Spain.

Antonio María de Bucareli, the Viceroy of New Spain commissioned military engineer Miguel Constanzó to design the building, but Miguel Mascaró designed and calculated the cost of the work in 1788. The Academy of San Fernando disapproved the design, so in 1793 it commissioned the construction of the building to the Spanish architect Antonio González Velázquez, director of architecture of the Academy of San Carlos. Four years later the work was suspended, and it was not until 1804 when the architect Ignacio Castera resumed the work until its completion in June 1807.

A year later the building was remodeled, and it had other uses besides being a tobacco factory. In 1815 it served as a political prison for the insurgent Don José María Morelos y Pavón, from where he emerged to be shot in San Cristóbal Ecatepec.

During the Independence Movement, Viceroy Félix María Calleja made the necessary arrangements for the building to be designated as the General Artillery Park, officially becoming a Citadel, on October 19, 1816.

Once Independence was achieved, General Guadalupe Victoria used the Citadel building to store weapons. Later, President Vicente Guerrero corrected the exterior layout, expanded and deepened the moats that surrounded it, and remodeled its patios and rooms.

Due to its architecture, the construction of the Citadel responds to the neoclassical style and sober ornamentation in keeping with the time in which it was built, and due to the solidity of its structure that gives it an appearance of a fortress, it was the scene of several political and military pronouncements such as the cuartelazo of 1913, pronounced by the anti-Maderista forces and better known as "The Tragic Decade.”

The Ciudadela building was in charge of military authorities, who used it for various uses such as a weapons warehouse, craftsmanship and armory workshops, political prison, barracks, hospital, laboratory and military health warehouses. Until recently, the La Ciudadela building was shared with offices of the Secretariat of National Defense and the Interior.

The building was declared a historical monument in 1931, because it is located in the monument area of the Historic Center of Mexico City, and is listed in the respective decree, published in the Official Gazette on April 11, 1980.

=== Library ===
On January 30, 1944, the then President of the Republic, General Manuel Ávila Camacho, granted part of the La Ciudadela property to the Library of Mexico, thanks to the efforts made by José Vasconcelos, who intended to rescue and reorganize the National Library, project that he never saw realized. The Library of Mexico was inaugurated on November 27, 1946, and its first director was José Vasconcelos. He served until his death in 1959. After Vasconcelos died, María Teresa Chávez Campomanes became the director, serving until 1979.

In December 1987, the Ministry of Public Education ordered the reconstruction and remodeling of the building, a project that was entrusted to the architect Abraham Zabludovsky, National Art Prize winner. Zabludovsky proposed that the building retain the original structure and that a novel structure of transparent steel and glass umbrellas cover the patios, without touching the old building.

In 2011, Conaculta had the purpose of restoring and returning the construction to its former splendor and giving way to La Ciudadela, the City of Books. The project also included 21st century innovations and technology in an 18th-century building, as well as a bookstore, reading rooms, digital services, a children's room, an area for people with visual disabilities, a gallery for exhibitions, the recovery of circulation and a comprehensive use of space in an environment of great architectural attractiveness. The new architectural intervention was carried out by the General Directorate of Historical Heritage Sites and Monuments, under the responsibility of the architects Bernardo Gómez-Pimienta and Alejandro Sánchez.
