= Behnaam Aazhang =

Iranian-American computer engineer

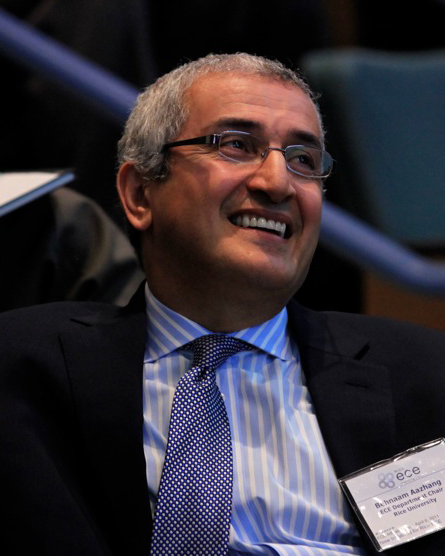
- Born: December 7, 1957 (age 67); Bandar-Anzali, Iran
- Education: University of Illinois at Urbana-Champaign (BS, MS, PhD)
- Awards: 2013 IEEE Communication Society Award for Advances in Communication; 2012 Fellow of American Association for the Advancement of Science; 1999 IEEE Fellow; 2004 Thompson-Reuters Highly Cited Researchers
- Scientific career
- Doctoral advisor: Vincent Poor
- Notable students: Maïté Brandt-Pearce

Behnaam Aazhang (born December 7, 1957) is the J.S. Abercrombie Professor in Electrical and Computer Engineering at Rice University and Director of the Rice Neuroengineering Initiative.

== Early life and education ==
Aazhang was born in Bandar-Anzali, Iran, and attended Sharif University of Technology in Tehran, Iran from 1975 until 1978. He moved to the United States in 1979. Aazhang received his B.S., M.S., and Ph.D. degrees in Electrical and Computer Engineering in 1981, 1983, and 1986, respectively, from the University of Illinois at Urbana-Champaign. Aazhang was a research assistant in the Coordinated Science Laboratory at the University of Illinois from 1981 to 1985. In August 1985, he joined the faculty of Rice University in Electrical and Computer Engineering.

== Career and Research ==
Aazhang served as founding director of Rice's Center for Multimedia Communications (CMC) from 1998 until 2006. He was the Department Chair of Electrical and Computer Engineering from 2004 until 2014. He held an Academy of Finland Distinguished Visiting Professorship appointment (FiDiPro) at the University of Oulu in Finland from 2006 until 2014. For his contributions, he received an honorary doctorate in 2017 (the highest honor the university can bestow). During his career, he served as visiting professor or visiting scientist at several institutions, including IBM Federal Systems Company, ETH Zurich, Helsinki University of Technology and Nokia Mobile. He has been the Director of the Rice Neuroengineering Initiative since 2018.

Aazhang holds the J.S. Abercrombie Professorship in the Department of Electrical and Computer Engineering at Rice University. His research interests include signal and data processing, information theory, and dynamical systems, with applications in neuro-engineering. His work focuses on understanding neuronal circuit connectivity and the effects of learning on these connections, developing minimally and non-invasive real-time closed-loop stimulation methods to treat disorders such as epilepsy, Parkinson’s disease, depression, obesity, and mild traumatic brain injury. He is also involved in creating patient-specific multisite wireless systems for precise heart monitoring and pacing, as well as algorithms to detect, predict, and prevent security breaches in cloud computing systems.

== Awards and honors ==
Aazhang was elected a Fellow of the Institute of Electrical and Electronics Engineers (IEEE) in 1999 for contributions to multi-user wideband digital cellular communications. In addition, he was also elected a Fellow of the American Association for the Advancement of Science (AAAS) in 2012.

He received the SIGMOBILE Test of Time (ToT) Award in 2019 which recognizes outstanding papers that have had a lasting impact on the field of mobile computing, for the paper “Design of WARP: a wireless open-access research platform”.

== Personal life ==
Aazhang lives in Houston, TX with his wife, Lisa. He has four children.
