= San Juan River (Chile) =

River in Chile

- Location of the mouth

Location
- Country: Chile

Physical characteristics
- Mouth
  - location: Strait of Magellan
  - coordinates: 53°38′54″S 70°56′30″W
- Discharge
  - average: 20 m^{3}/s (710 cu ft/s)

San Juan River (Spanish: río San Juan) is a river in Brunswick Peninsula in Chile's Magallanes Region. The river is the main water supply for the city of Punta Arenas. It drains to the Strait of Magellan.
