= Department of Electrical and Computer Engineering (Rice University) =

- Type: Academic department
- Chair: Dr. Ashutosh Sabharwal
- Location: Houston, United States
- Affiliations: Rice University; George R. Brown School of Engineering
- Website: ece.rice.edu

The Department of Electrical and Computer Engineering is one of nine academic departments at the George R. Brown School of Engineering at Rice University. Ashutosh Sabharwal is the department chair. Originally the Department of Electrical Engineering, it was renamed to the Department of Electrical and Computer Engineering in 1984.

== Research ==
Rice ECE Faculty perform research in the following areas: Computer Engineering; Data Science, Neuroengineering; Photonics, Electronics and Nano-devices, and Systems. Rice has a long history in digital signal processing (DSP) dating back to its inception in the late 1960s.

Computer Engineering faculty have a research focus in analog and mixed-signal design, VLSI signal processing, computer architecture and embedded systems, biosensors and computer vision, and hardware security and storage systems, including applications to education. Biosensors and mobile wireless healthcare are growing application areas in embedded systems research. Smartphones with imaging devices are leading to new areas in computer vision and sensing. In the area of computer architecture, research interests include parallel computing, large-scale storage systems, and resource scheduling for performance and power.

Data Science faculty integrate the foundations, tools and techniques involving data acquisition (sensors and systems), data analytics (machine learning, statistics), data storage and computing infrastructure (GPU/CPU computing, FPGAs, cloud computing, security and privacy) in order to enable meaningful extraction of actionable information from diverse and potentially massive data sources.

Neuroengineering faculty are members of the Rice Center for Neuroengineering, a collaborative effort with Texas Medical Center researchers. They develop technology for treating and diagnosing neural diseases. Current research areas include interrogating neural circuits at the cellular level, analyzing neuronal data in real-time, and manipulating healthy or diseased neural circuit activity and connectivity using nano electronics, optics, and emerging photonics technologies.

Photonics, Electronics and Nano-device researchers focus on nanophotonics and plasmonics, optical nanosensor and nano-actuator development, studies of new materials, in particular nanomaterials and magnetically active materials; imaging and image processing, including multispectral imaging and terahertz imaging; ultrafast spectroscopy and dynamics; laser applications in remote and point sensing, especially for trace gas detection; nanometer-scale characterization of surfaces, molecules, and devices; organic semiconductor devices; single-molecule transistors; and applications of Nanoshells in biomedicine.

Current Rice ECE Systems research spans a wide range of areas including image and video analysis, representation, and compression; wavelets and multiscale methods; statistical signal processing, pattern recognition, and learning theory; distributed signal processing and sensor networks; communication systems; computational neuroscience; and wireless networking.

== See also ==
- Rice University
- George R. Brown School of Engineering
