= Maïté Brandt-Pearce =

Optical engineer and academic administrator

Maïté Brandt-Pearce is an American optical engineer and academic administrator, the vice provost for faculty affairs at the University of Virginia, where she also holds a professorship in the Department of Electrical Engineering. Her research concerns optical networking and fiber-optic communication.

== Education and career ==
Brandt-Pearce majored in electrical engineering at Rice University, graduating in 1985. She then worked for several years for Lockheed Corporation, at NASA's Johnson Space Center. Returning to Rice for graduate study, she earned a master's degree in 1989 and completed her Ph.D. in 1993. Her dissertation, High-Throughput Optical Code-Division Multiple Access Communication Systems, was supervised by Behnaam Aazhang.

She has been a faculty member at the University of Virginia since 1993. She became executive associate dean of engineering in 2015, and joined the office of the provost at the University of Virginia in 2018. She is also a co-founder of optical communications spinoff firm VLNComm.

== Recognition ==
Brandt-Pearce was Jubilee Professor in 2014 at Chalmers University in Sweden. She was elected as an IEEE Fellow, in the 2023 class of fellows, "for contributions to optical wireless and fiber communications".
