= María Teresa López =

María Teresa López may refer to:

- María Teresa López Álvarez (born 1980), Spanish politician
- María Teresa López Beltrán (1950–2012), Spanish historian and medievalist
- María Teresa López Boegeholz (1927–2006), Chilean oceanographer
- Águeda de Vianney (1928–2003), birth name María Teresa López González, Spanish novelist
