= Maria Teresa Parpagliolo =

Italian landscape and garden designer

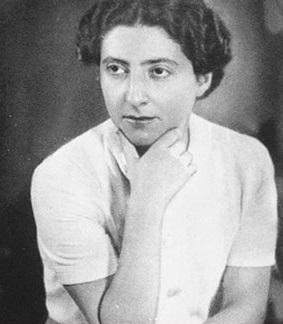
- Born: 1903
- Died: 1974 (aged 70–71); Rome, Italy
- Occupation: Landscape designer

Maria Teresa Parpagliolo (1903 – 1974) was an Italian landscape and garden designer who worked on private and public projects in Italy and Britain from 1920 until her death. She was a member of the British Landscape Institute and is considered to have been a pioneer of European landscape design.

Parpagliolo studied with Percy Stephen Cane from 1931 to 1932, worked on the French War Cemetery in Rome in 1944 and contributed to the foundation of the International Federation of Landscape Architects in 1948. She worked on the Regatta Restaurant Garden at the Festival of Britain in 1951. In 1963, she planned the landscape surrounding the Rome Cavalieri Hotel.

In 1970-71, Parpagliolo conducted investigations in the Bagh-e Babur garden in Kabul on behalf of IsMEO (Istituto italiano per il Medio ed Estremo Oriente). In a series of relief studies in the garden, she attempted to determine its original structure, including the position of the water basins, the path organization, or the tree composition. She published the results in 1972.
