= María Teresa Cano =

Colombian artist (born 1960)

- Born: 1960 (age 65–66); Medellín, Colombia

María Teresa Cano (born 1960) is a Colombian conceptual artist.

== Biography ==
Maria Teresa Cano was born in Medellin, Colombia (1960). Her first real acknowledgement at her art was back in 1981 for her production of Yo servida a la mesa at the Primer Salón Arturo y Rebecca Rabinovich. In her performance Cano, used jello to recreate her face becoming the center of attention. With her next few works, she focused on the lack of a body presence seen within Calor de hogar (1984) and Distancias (1990). Her vision in the early and mid 2000s shifted towards animal avatars and iconography. Cano continued to investigate the role art can play outside the traditional gallery as seen with efforts trying to start a new art activism (Mi vida es privada, pública mi educación 2002).

== Education ==
Cano graduated from the plastic arts department of the University of Antioquia in Medellin, Colombia. She studied art in Medellin for nine years from 1980 to 1989. It was during this time she began receiving attention for her works, receiving both positive and negative reviews.

== Artworks ==
- Yo servida a la mesa 1981 is one of Cano's earliest involvements in the art scene was at event held by the Primer Salón Arturo y Rebecca Rabinovich.
- Calor de hogar 1983 is of mark an iron made with its steam. It is presented on a brownish canvas with the iron mark being the shape of the iron in dark brown, looking like copper or rust. For this art piece, Cano used a work of aesthetic contents that transforms from formal to conceptual. The repeated action of branding the canvas with the imprint of the iron symbolizes the daily work of people that becomes an ideological, cultural and intimate burden, but also the time that goes by persistently elaborating the same activity again and again. The imprint that appears is arranged solitarily without more other elements other than the ocher leaving by heat, "as if it were the brush, is the instrument used for the plastic, as well as the tool for everyday life".
- Quizas el ultimo encuentro amoroso quizas el ultimo beso sera 1991, which art critics described her art as "destructively" aligned small pixel-like squares on a sticky surface.
- Sobre nupcias y ausencias 1992 included a fragment of Juana de Ibarbourou's poem "Olor frutal" written out across a red and pink flowerlike wallpaper. This was meant to encapsulate the socially constructed, romanticized cliche between a married woman and her husband.
- Horda 1997 was one of Cano's earlier experimentations with animals in her art pieces. This piece was made by printing red and white sheep-like animals onto a red canvas with the words "El diablo anda suelto como león reglente ... " which translates into the devil is loose as a rejuvenating lion.

== Exhibitions ==
- Instalaciones 1991 was a Colombian art exhibition which was the first exclusively to display installations as a formal and conceptual art medium.
- Aproximaciones 1993 was an exhibition which included five artists whose ideas in one way or another resonated their voice to the viewer.
- Radical Women Latin American Art, 1960–1985 (2018) was an exhibition which included Latin women artists who focused on using the female body for political and social critiques and artistic expression.

== Bibliography ==
- Fajardo-Hill, Cecilia, Giunta, Andrea, and Alonso, Rodrigo. Radical Women : Latin American Art, 1960–1985. Los Angeles: Hammer Museum and Del Monico Books/Prestel, 2017. Print.
