= Maria Teresa del Real =

American ballet dancer

Maria Teresa del Real is an American ballet dancer (born 1963, in Miami.) She achieved success early in her career by winning a bronze medal at the International Ballet Competition in Varna, Bulgaria in 1983. During her subsequent international career she held principal dancer positions with Pittsburgh Ballet Theater (USA), Royal Ballet of Flanders (Belgium) and English National Ballet (U.K.) and guested with companies including Birmingham Royal Ballet, Ballet de Santiago, Chile and Scottish Ballet. She has partnered with Rudolf Nureyev, Fernando Bujones, José Manuel Carreño, Maximiliano Guerra and Carlos Acosta. Currently she is an international master teacher and coach.
