= Maria Teresa Armengol =

Andorran politician

Maria Teresa Armengol i Bonet is an Andorran politician, the first woman democratically elected member of the General Council of Andorra in the 1985 parliamentary election. She held the office until the end of the legislature, in 1989.

In 2005, she was also the first woman appointed to the Superior Council of Justice of Andorra, an office Armengol held until 2011. She was appointed by the Andorran judges.
