= María Teresa Castañón =

Chilean politician

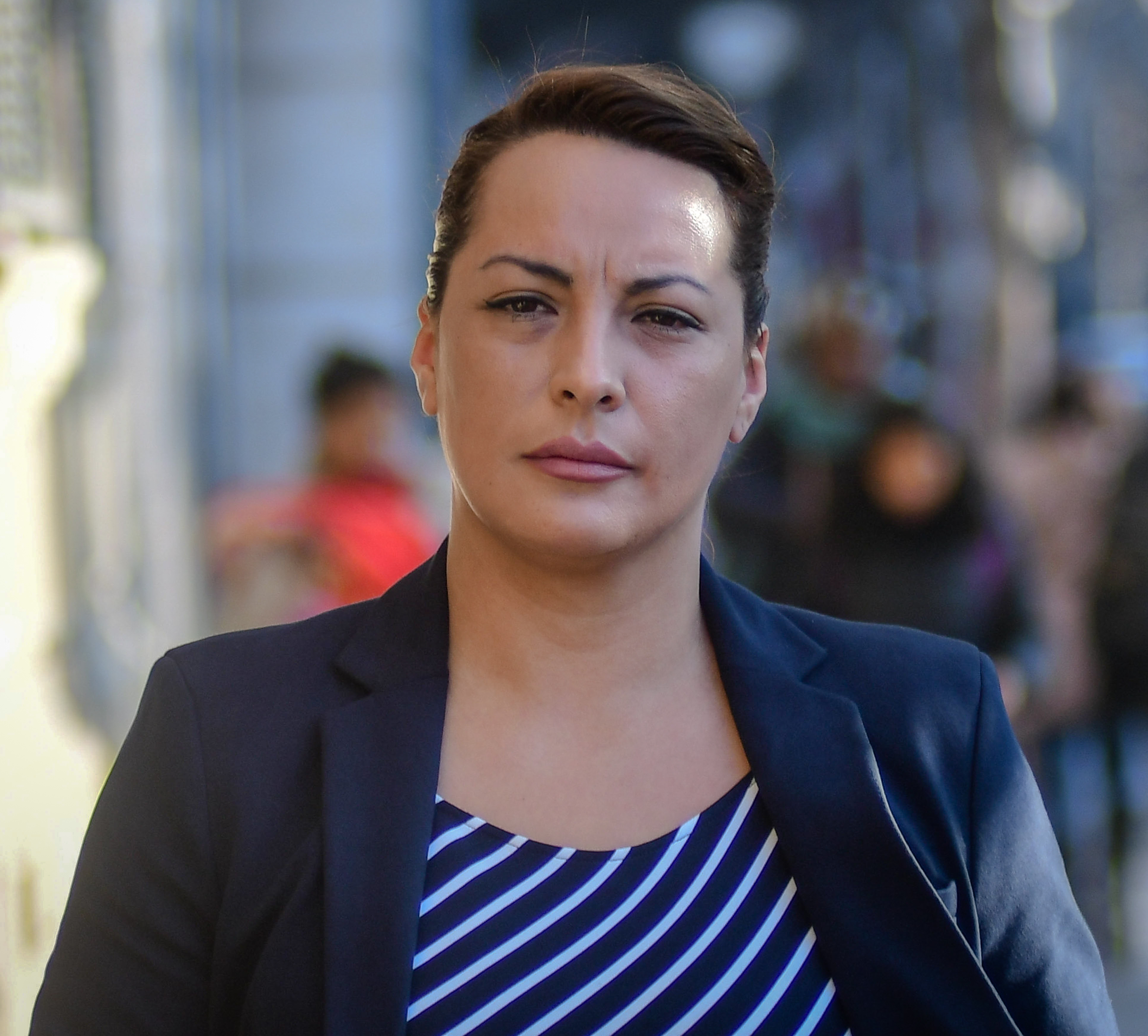
- Castañón in 2018

Intendant of the Magallanes Region and the Chilean Antarctic
- In office 11 July 2018 – 12 February 2019
- Preceded by: Christian Matheson Villán
- Succeeded by: José Fernández Dübrock

Personal details
- Born: 27 October 1978 (age 47) Punta Arenas, Chile
- Party: Renovación Nacional
- Education: Santo Tomás University (BA)
- Occupation: Politician
- Profession: Social worker

María Teresa Castañón Silva (born 27 October 1978) is a Chilean politician who served as councillor of Punta Arenas and as intendant of the Magallanes Region and the Chilean Antarctic Territory.

In 2021, she run as candidate for the Constitutional Convention for the 28th District.
