= María Teresa Chávez Campomanes =

Mexican librarian

- Born: August 1, 1890; Puebla de los Ángeles, Mexico
- Died: February 24, 1981 (aged 90)
- Education: National University of Mexico
- Occupations: Librarian and archivist
- Known for: Library science education

María Teresa Chávez Campomanes (1 August 1890, Puebla de los Ángeles, Mexico - 24 February 1981) was a Mexican librarian and library science educator. She is regarded as the very foundation of teaching at the National School of Archivists and Librarians of the Secretariat of Education. The majority of Mexican librarians of the next era studied under her. She was named Teacher Emeritus of the Secretariat of Education and is known as one of the most respected and influential women of México, partially because of the cataloging tools she created.

== Education ==
Chávez studied under Emilio Baz at the School for Librarians in Mexico City. Chávez graduated from the Pratt Institute in the United States. Chávez continued her education doing postgraduate work in Detroit, Michigan and Columbia, focusing on library science.

In 1953, Chávez received her doctorate in Literature after writing her thesis on books that later became classics at the National University of Mexico.

== Employment ==
After graduation, she worked in the New York Public Library and Washington DC's Library of Congress. She later returned to México and studied Spanish literature at the National University in the department of Philosophy and Letters. She became the Director of the Franklin Library and the Library of México under the philosopher José Vasconcelos. She aimed to make libraries an extension of the classroom.

She helped found UNAM Colegio de Bibliotecología. To help her students, she created a tool called "Catalogers and Classifiers Manual", which became a basic reference work for catalogers.
