= María Teresa García Pedroche =

American artist and curator

- Born: Brownsville, Texas
- Education: Southwest State University (B.F.A.); Texas Woman's University (M.F.A.)
- Occupations: Artist, curator
- Writing career
- Years active: 1963-present

María Teresa García Pedroche is an American award winning artist and curator.

== Early life ==
Born in Brownsville, Texas in 1959, María Teresa García Pedroche began cultivating her artistic talents from a young age. She earned her BFA in Communication Arts and Painting from Southwest State University (now Texas State University) in 1982. In 1988 she received her MFA in Painting and Ceramics from Texas Woman's University in Denton.

== Professional career ==
From January 1990 to May 2000, María Teresa García Pedroche served as the Associate Curator and Education Director at the Meadows Museum in Dallas. From May 2000 to 2016 she served as Head of Family Experiences and Community Engagement at the Dallas Museum of Art.

== Selected exhibitions and other works ==
María Teresa García Pedroche has had exhibitions throughout Texas, as well as in countries such as Mexico and Spain. One of her most well-known exhibits, Todo sobre mi madre (all about my mother) opened at the Bath House Cultural Center in Dallas 2010. This exhibit featured a collection of her multimedia collage prints that explored the relationship between herself and her mother, in addition to other family members. She was also featured in the Tejano Art Exhibition "Cultura y Vida" at the Art Center of Corpus Christi in 2012.

== Central themes of artwork ==
María Teresa García Pedroche utilizes many mediums such as multimedia prints and painting to explore the intricacies of her familial relationships. In doing so she evokes a sense of nostalgia through the assemblage of antique collaged items. Furthermore, the superimposition of religious and spiritual iconography on family pictures provides the viewer with an insight into her family's religious beliefs. Her oil paintings explore themes of womanhood through the various representation forms of the female figure. While her multimedia media works demonstrate her finesse in techniques like double exposure, the angularity and shading in works such as Lágrimas tiene el camino demonstrate her mastery of painting as well.
