= Juan Marino Cabello =

Chilean composer, writer, screenwriter, bandleader and lyricist

Juan Marino Cabello (1920–2007) was a Chilean composer, writer, screenwriter, bandleader and lyricist.
