= María Teresa Sesé =

Spanish writer (1917–2019)

María Teresa Sesé (4 October 1917 – 2019) was a Spanish writer. Often regarded as one of the most prolific and popular writers in Spain, she is known for over 500 romance novels which were published between 1940 and 1975. She wrote most of her books in Spanish, but after studying Basque for two years, she wrote books in that language. Her works have been translated and republished in several languages.

== Life and career ==
María Teresa Sesé Lazcano was born on 4 October 1917 in San Sebastián, Spain, to an Aragonese father and a Biscayan mother. From her 20s, she began writing in Spanish and French. In 1940, her first novel Un padrino despreocupado (A carefree godfather) was published by Pueyo publishers. Her subsequent works were published by Editorial Bruguera. Between 1940 and 1975, she published over 500 romance novels, often completing one novel every week. Owing to the large number of books she wrote and published in the 35 years, she is often regarded as "the other Corín Tellado".

Sesé became one of the most prolific and most popular romance fiction writers in Spain. Her works have been published over 1000 times and translated into several languages. She did not regard her own work as valuable except that it allowed her to earn a living. Most of her works are set in her hometown San Sebastián. Although she published books in Spanish, she later turned her attention to Basque. After studying Basque for two years, she wrote some short story collections in that language. She signed her later novels as Maite Lazcano, and wrote a few stories in Basque under the pen name Maite Lazkano.

Sesé turned 100 in October 2017, and died in 2019.
