= Deaths in January 2021 =

The following is a list of notable deaths in January 2021.

Entries for each day are listed alphabetically by surname. A typical entry lists information in the following sequence:

- Name, age, country of citizenship at birth, subsequent country of citizenship (if applicable), reason for notability, cause of death (if known), and reference.

== January 2021 ==
=== 1 ===
- Abdul Hakim Al-Taher, 71, Sudanese director and actor, COVID-19.
- George Ancona, 91, American photo essayist and illustrator.
- Barry Austin, 52, British record holder, nation's heaviest man, heart attack.
- Jan de Bie, 74, Dutch painter and photographer.
- Dame Margaret Booth, 87, British judge, judge of the High Court of Justice (1979–1994), chair of the Family and Parenting Institute (1999–2004).
- Clint Boulton, 72, English footballer (Port Vale, Torquay United).
- Colin J. Bushnell, 73, British mathematician.
- Carlos do Carmo, 81, Portuguese fado singer ("Uma flor de verde pinho"), ruptured aneurysm.
- Ben Chafin, 60, American politician, member of the Virginia House of Delegates (2014) and Senate (since 2014), complications from COVID-19.
- Emanuele Chiapasco, 90, Italian baseball player (Milano Baseball Club), sporting director, and entrepreneur.
- Simone Chrisostome, 97, French resistance member and Holocaust survivor.
- Pierantonio Costa, 81, Italian businessman and diplomat, arranged safe passage during the Rwandan genocide.
- Christine Dacera, 23, Filipino flight attendant, ruptured aortic aneurysm.
- Carrie Dann, 88, American Western Shoshone indigenous rights activist and spiritual leader.
- Paul Delorey, 71, Canadian curler and politician, Northwest Territories MLA (1999–2011).
- Traude Dierdorf, 73, Austrian politician, mayor of Wiener Neustadt (1997–2005).
- Irene Dixon, 96, British World War II codebreaker.
- Ron Dominguez, 85, American theme park executive, vice-president of Walt Disney Attractions (1990–1994).
- Zoran Džorlev, 53, Macedonian violinist, complications from COVID-19.
- Mark Eden, 92, English actor (Coronation Street, The Top Secret Life of Edgar Briggs, An Adventure in Space and Time), complications from Alzheimer's disease.
- Carlos Escudé, 72, Argentine political scientist and author, COVID-19.
- Cleonâncio Fonseca, 84, Brazilian politician, deputy (1987–2007).
- Seizō Fukumoto, 77, Japanese actor (Nihon no Fixer, New Battles Without Honor and Humanity, The Last Samurai), lung cancer.
- George Gerdes, 72, American singer-songwriter and actor (Hidalgo, The Girl with the Dragon Tattoo, L.A. Noire), brain aneurysm.
- Dame Elmira Minita Gordon, 90, Belizean educator, psychologist, and politician, governor-general (1981–1993).
- Ágúst Herbert Guðmundsson, 53, Icelandic basketball player and coach (Þór Akureyri), motor neurone disease.
- Bernard Guignedoux, 73, French football player (Paris Saint-Germain, Monaco) and manager (Valenciennes).
- Joanne Head, 90, American politician, member of the New Hampshire House of Representatives (1976–1984).
- Pablo Hernández, 80, Colombian Olympic racing cyclist (1964).
- Abderrahim Lahjouji, 79, Moroccan construction executive and politician, founder of the Citizens' Forces, complications from COVID-19.
- Ishak Pamumbu Lambe, 74, Indonesian pastor (Toraja Church) and politician, senator (2004–2009).
- Michele Leber, 82, American journalist (The Post-Crescent).
- Floyd Little, 78, American Hall of Fame football player (Syracuse Orange, Denver Broncos), cancer.
- Harald Maartmann, 94, Norwegian Olympic cross-country skier (1952).
- Georg Maier, 79, German actor (Familie Meier, Irgendwie und Sowieso) and theatre director.
- Christian Massé, 69, French writer.
- Mohammad-Taqi Mesbah-Yazdi, 85, Iranian Islamic cleric and philosopher, member of the Assembly of Experts (1991–2016).
- Misty Morgan, 75, American country music singer (Jack Blanchard & Misty Morgan), cancer.
- Muspandi, 45, Indonesian politician, member of the East Kalimantan Regional People's Representative Council (since 2014), COVID-19.
- Bill Neal, 80, American pediatric cardiologist.
- Norma, 74, French comic book artist.
- Rosemary Nyerere, 59, Tanzanian politician, MP (2000–2005).
- Dhimitër Orgocka, 84, Albanian actor and director, People's Artist, cerebral hemorrhage.
- Jean Panisse, 92, French actor (An Angel on Wheels, The Young Wolves, Perched on a Tree), COVID-19.
- Paatje Phefferkorn, 98, Indonesian-born Dutch martial artist, COVID-19.
- Toabur Rahim, Bangladeshi politician, MP (1973–1976), COVID-19.
- Liam Reilly, 65, Irish singer and songwriter (Bagatelle).
- Paige Rense, 91, American editor (Architectural Digest), heart disease.
- Usama Nadeem Satti, 22, Pakistani student, shot.
- Sun Qiaolu, 25, Chinese actress, heart attack.
- Thomas H. B. Symons, 91, Canadian professor and author, president of Trent University (1961–1972).
- Tam Sheung-wai, 86, Hong Kong academic administrator, president of the Open University of Hong Kong (1997–2003).
- Felix Tarasenko, 88, Russian mathematician.
- Jan Vering, 66, German gospel singer and playwright.
- George Whitmore, 89, American mountaineer and conservationist, member of first team to summit El Capitan, complications from COVID-19.

=== 2 ===
- Cléber Arado, 48, Brazilian footballer (Kyoto Purple Sanga, Coritiba), COVID-19.
- Alex Asmasoebrata, 69, Indonesian auto racer and politician, MP (1992–1997).
- Mary Catherine Bateson, 81, American writer and cultural anthropologist.
- Mirzaq Biqtash, 75, Algerian writer.
- Asher Brauner, 74, American actor (B.A.D. Cats, Switchblade Sisters, General Hospital).
- Joan Bullock-Morrell, 92, New Zealand sculptor.
- Robbins Burling, 94, American anthropologist and sociolinguist.
- Lady Mary Colman, 88, English socialite and philanthropist.
- Brad Cox, 76, American computer scientist.
- Brian Cowan, 58, Scottish actor (Taggart, Family Affairs, River City).
- Bahrum Daido, 56, Indonesian politician, MP (2009–2019), COVID-19.
- Oleg Danilov, 71, Russian playwright and screenwriter (You Are My Only Love, From Hell to Hell, Give Me Moonlight), COVID-19.
- Miquel Ferrer, 89, Spanish footballer (FC Barcelona, CD Condal, Real Oviedo).
- Rob Flockhart, 64, Canadian ice hockey player (Vancouver Canucks, Minnesota North Stars), heart attack.
- Marco Formentini, 90, Italian politician, deputy (1992–1993), MEP (1994–2004), and mayor of Milan (1993–1997).
- Guadalupe Grande, 55, Spanish poet.
- Wahid Hamed, 76, Egyptian screenwriter (Terrorism and Kebab, Ma'ali al Wazir, The Yacoubian Building).
- P. G. Harlankar, 88, Indian police officer, police commissioner of Bangalore (1983–1986).
- Patrick Hull, 54, American entrepreneur.
- Bernadette Isaac-Sibille, 90, French politician, deputy (1988–2002).
- Modibo Keita, 78, Malian politician, prime minister (2002, 2015–2017).
- Vladimir Korenev, 80, Russian actor (Amphibian Man, Children of Don Quixote, Criminal Talent) and teacher, People's Artist (1998), COVID-19.
- Robert Livingston, 87, American Zen Buddhist teacher.
- Arsenio Lope Huerta, 77, Spanish politician, mayor of Alcalá de Henares (1983–1987).
- Michael McKevitt, 71, Irish republican, founder of Real IRA, cancer.
- Ryder Mofokeng, 68, South African football player (Kaizer Chiefs).
- Christopher Moore, 80, British DJ and radio presenter (Radio Caroline).
- Neelamperoor Madhusoodanan Nair, 84, Indian poet.
- Aylin Özmenek, 79, Turkish animator, complications from COVID-19.
- W. B. Park, 84, American cartoonist and illustrator, heart failure.
- Marek Pivovar, 56, Czech writer and theatre director, complications from COVID-19.
- Mike Reese, 42, American politician, member of the Pennsylvania House of Representatives (since 2009), ruptured brain aneurysm following COVID-19.
- Don Salls, 101, American football player (Alabama Crimson Tide) and coach (Jacksonville State Gamecocks).
- Yuri Saukh, 69, Russian football player (SKA Rostov, CSKA Moscow, Soviet Union national team) and manager.
- George Seage, 63, American epidemiologist, acute myeloid leukemia.
- Buta Singh, 86, Indian politician, minister of home affairs (1986–1989), governor of Bihar (2004–2006), and chairman of NCSC (2007–2010), complications from a cerebral haemorrhage.
- Gary Staples, 80, American politician, member of the Mississippi House of Representatives (1988–1992, 2004–2020), cancer.
- Aziz Tamoyan, 87, Armenian politician, president of the Yezidi National Union (since 1989).
- Subiakto Tjakrawerdaya, 76, Indonesian politician, minister of cooperatives and small business (1993–1998), COVID-19.
- Sir Brian Urquhart, 101, British diplomat, under-secretary-general of the United Nations (1971–1985).
- Rudolf Vatinyan, 79, Armenian cinematographer (The Tango of Our Childhood).
- Kerry Vincent, 75, Australian pastry chef and television personality (Food Network Challenge).
- Johannes Wallmann, 90, German theologian, COVID-19.
- Paul Westphal, 70, American Hall of Fame basketball player (Boston Celtics, Phoenix Suns) and coach (Sacramento Kings), glioblastoma.
- Brian Whitcombe, 86, Welsh rugby union player (Keighley).

=== 3 ===
- Tasso Adamopoulos, 76, French violist, COVID-19.
- Carlos Aránguiz, 67, Chilean jurist, justice of the Supreme Court (since 2014), pulmonary fibrosis.
- David Arnold, 81, American mathematician.
- Raúl Baglini, 71, Argentine politician, deputy (1983–1993) and senator (2001–2003).
- Lee Breuer, 83, American playwright (The Gospel at Colonus).
- Alf Callick, 95, Australian footballer (South Melbourne).
- Valentina Chumicheva, 89, Russian Olympic diver (1952, 1956).
- Alan Daly, 91, Australian footballer (Melbourne).
- Zoe Davison, 60, British horse trainer, cancer.
- Eric Jerome Dickey, 59, American author, cancer.
- Cornelis Feoh, 57, Indonesian politician, member of the East Nusa Tenggara Regional People's Representative Council (since 2019).
- Salvador Franco, Venezuelan Pemon detainee, tuberculosis.
- Rosa Giannetta, 75, Italian journalist and sociologist.
- Roger Hassenforder, 90, French racing cyclist.
- Oyewusi Ibidapo-Obe, 71, Nigerian academic administrator, vice chancellor of the University of Lagos (2000–2007), COVID-19.
- Naohiro Ikeda, 80, Japanese volleyball player, Olympic silver medallist (1968), lymphoma.
- Shyamji Kanojia, 65, Indian cricketer (Railways).
- Rabeya Khatun, 85, Bangladeshi novelist, cardiac arrest.
- Dick Kulpa, 67, American cartoonist (Cracked, Weekly World News), cancer.
- Renate Lasker-Harpprecht, 96, German Holocaust survivor and journalist.
- Shani Mahadevappa, 88, Indian actor (Shankar Guru, Kaviratna Kalidasa, Guru Brahma), complications from COVID-19.
- Gerry Marsden, 78, English musician (Gerry and the Pacemakers, The Crowd), heart infection.
- Anil Panachooran, 51, Indian lyricist (Arabikkatha, Katha Parayumpol, Marykkundoru Kunjaadu) and poet, cardiac arrest.
- Donald Perry Polsky, 92, American architect, COVID-19 and pneumonia.
- Barbara J. Rae, 90, Canadian businesswoman.
- Werner Rataiczyk, 99, German painter.
- George F. Regas, 90, American Episcopal priest, rector of All Saints Episcopal Church (Pasadena) (1967–1995).
- James C. Renick, 72, American academic administrator, chancellor of University of Michigan–Dearborn (1993–1999) and North Carolina A&T State University (1999–2006), complications from amyotrophic lateral sclerosis.
- Manola Robles, 72, Chilean journalist.
- Elena Santiago, 79, Spanish writer.
- Barbara Shelley, 88, British actress (Village of the Damned, Dracula: Prince of Darkness, Quatermass and the Pit), complications from COVID-19.
- Chuck Smith, 92, American politician.
- Ali Taher, 59, Indonesian politician, MP (1997–1999, since 2014), COVID-19.
- Al Ward, 93, American football executive (New York Jets).
- Wolfgang Wippermann, 75, German historian.
- Ricardo Akinobu Yamauti, 71, Brazilian politician, mayor of Praia Grande (1997–2000), COVID-19.

=== 4 ===
- Tom Acker, 90, American baseball player (Cincinnati Redlegs).
- Anatoliy Butenko, 82, Ukrainian politician, MP (1990–1994).
- Ronnie Burgess, 57, American football player (Green Bay Packers), cardiac arrest.
- Judy Cornell, 87, American Olympic swimmer (1952).
- Mollie C. Davis, 88, American activist and academic.
- Josep Fornas, 96, Spanish editor and politician, member of the Parliament of Catalonia (1980–1984).
- Patrick Gillard, 73, Belgian Olympic field hockey player.
- Sandra Hutchens, 65, American law enforcement official, sheriff-coroner of Orange County, California (2008–2019), breast cancer.
- Lee Heung-kam, 88, Hong Kong actress (Story of the White-Haired Demon Girl, Moonlight Resonance, Can't Buy Me Love).
- Franco Loi, 90, Italian poet.
- Laurent Mailhot, 89, Canadian historian and writer.
- John Muckler, 86, Canadian ice hockey coach (Minnesota North Stars, Edmonton Oilers, Buffalo Sabres) and executive, complications from heart surgery.
- Peter Neumair and Laura Perselli, Italian murder victims, strangulation.
- Elias Rahbani, 82, Lebanese lyricist and composer, COVID-19.
- Bernard P. Randolph, 87, American general, complications from COVID-19.
- Tanya Roberts, 71, American actress (A View to a Kill, That '70s Show, Charlie's Angels), sepsis.
- Guillermo Rodríguez Melgarejo, 77, Argentine Roman Catholic prelate, bishop of San Martín (2003–2018).
- Albert Roux, 85, French restaurateur and chef (The Waterside Inn, Le Gavroche).
- Jane Savoie, 71, American equestrian.
- M. R. Schunker, 96, Indian naval officer, FOCWF (1976–1977), vice chief of the Naval Staff (1980–1982) and director general of the Coast Guard (1982–1984).
- George Sekul, 83, American football coach.
- Gregory Sierra, 83, American actor (Barney Miller, Sanford and Son, The Other Side of the Wind), cancer.
- Antoni Stankiewicz, 85, Polish Roman Catholic prelate, lawyer and theologian, dean of the Tribunal of the Roman Rota (2004–2012).
- Butch Stewart, 79, Jamaican hotelier, founder and chairman of Sandals Resorts and Beaches Resorts.
- Bambang Suryadi, 52, Indonesian politician, MP (since 2019), COVID-19.
- David Thompson, 84, British food manufacturing executive and horse stable owner (Cheveley Park Stud), co-founder of Hillsdown Holdings, renal failure.
- Kay Ullrich, 77, Scottish politician, MSP (1999–2003).
- Martinus J. G. Veltman, 89, Dutch theoretical physicist, Nobel laureate (1999).
- Karl-Heinz Vosgerau, 93, German actor (World on a Wire).

=== 5 ===
- Marie Albe, 96, French journalist (Radio France) and actress (Alone in the World, The Horseman on the Roof).
- Bonifácio José Tamm de Andrada, 90, Brazilian professor, lawyer and politician, deputy (1979–2019), complications from COVID-19.
- Colin Bell, 74, English footballer (Bury, Manchester City, national team).
- Jerry Berger, 87, American press agent and journalist (St. Louis Post-Dispatch).
- Emilia De Biasi, 62, Italian politician, deputy (2006–2013) and senator (2013–2018).
- C. George Boeree, 68, Dutch-born American psychologist.
- Brandãozinho, 90, Brazilian footballer (Palmeiras, Celta de Vigo).
- Bob Brett, 67, Australian tennis coach, cancer.
- Christina Crosby, 67, American scholar and writer, pancreatic cancer.
- João Cutileiro, 83, Portuguese sculptor, respiratory failure.
- Annasif Døhlen, 90, Norwegian sculptor.
- Thereasea Elder, 93, American nurse.
- Osian Ellis, 92, Welsh harpist and composer.
- Patricia C. Frist, 81, American banker and philanthropist.
- Karl Gamma, 93, Swiss Olympic alpine skier (1948).
- John Georgiadis, 81, British violinist (London Symphony Orchestra) and conductor (Malaysian Philharmonic Orchestra).
- Mluleki George, 72, South African politician, MP (1994–2008), founder of the United Congress, COVID-19.
- Vladimir Gerdt, 73, Russian mathematician.
- Benoît Godin, 62, Canadian political scientist and sociologist.
- Goldikova, 15, French Hall of Fame racehorse.
- Daniel Grau, 72, Venezuelan jazz musician.
- James Greene, 89, Northern Irish actor (William and Mary, Johnny English, Empire of the Sun).
- András Haán, 74, Hungarian Olympic basketball player (1964) and sailor (1976).
- Happy Man Tree, c. 150, British plane tree, Tree of the Year (2020), cut down.
- Robert Heptinstall, 100, British pathologist.
- Neil Hopkinson, 63, English Hellenist, myeloma.
- Kim Tschang-yeul, 91, South Korean painter.
- Tyberiy Korponay, 62, Ukrainian football player and manager (Karpaty Lviv, Zakarpattia Uzhhorod, Kremin Kremenchuk).
- Don Leppert, 90, American baseball player (Baltimore Orioles).
- A. Madhavan, 86, Indian writer.
- Jonas Neubauer, 39, American Tetris player, seven-time world champion, cardiac arrhythmia.
- Vladimír Oplt, 83, Czech politician, senator (1996–2000).
- Pat Patrick, 91, American racing team owner (Patrick Racing).
- John Richardson, 86, English actor (One Million Years B.C., Black Sunday, Torso), COVID-19.
- Moncer Rouissi, 80, Tunisian politician and diplomat, minister of social affairs, culture, vocational training, and education, ambassador to France (2003–2005).
- Thelma Shoher Baker, 96, American educator and anthropologist, COVID-19.
- Mehtab Singh, 72, Indian Olympic boxer (1972).
- Jim Sperry, 90, American politician, member of the South Dakota House of Representatives (1997–1998), COVID-19.
- Anatol Tsitou, 74, Belarusian historian.
- Vennelakanti, 63, Indian lyricist (Murali Krishnudu, Gharana Bullodu, Pellaina Kothalo), cardiac arrest.
- Pungky Purnomo Wibowo, 52, Indonesian economist, heart attack.
- Keliek Wicaksono, 42, Indonesian visual effects artist (212 Warrior), Citra Cup awardee (2018), blood cancer.
- William Windham, 94, British Olympic rower (1952).
- Mikhail Zhelev, 77, Bulgarian Olympic steeplechaser (1968, 1972).
- Joseph Zong Huaide, 100, Chinese Roman Catholic clandestine prelate, bishop of Sanyuan (1987–2003).

=== 6 ===
- Jonathan Aldrich, 84, American poet, stroke.
- Kenneth Z. Altshuler, 91, American psychiatrist, COVID-19.
- Ashli Babbitt, 35, American rioter, shot.
- Vladimir Biryukov, 87, Russian politician, governor of Kamchatka Oblast (1991–1996) and Kamchatka Krai (1996–2000).
- Mircea Bolba, 59, Romanian football player (Politehnica Timișoara, Bihor Oradea) and manager (Olimpia Satu Mare).
- Leonid Bujor, 65, Moldovan politician, deputy (2005–2009) and minister of education (2009–2011), COVID-19.
- Alan Burgess, 100, New Zealand cricketer (Canterbury).
- Thomas G. Carpenter, 94, American academic administrator, president of the University of North Florida (1969–1980) and University of Memphis (1980–1991).
- Mihai Cotorobai, 69, Moldovan politician, deputy (1990–1994), COVID-19.
- James Cross, 99, Irish-born British diplomat and kidnapping survivor (October Crisis), COVID-19.
- Bobby Davis, 83, American professional wrestler and manager.
- Peter S. Eagleson, 92, American hydrologist.
- Nsikak Eduok, 73, Nigerian air force officer, chief of the Air Staff (1993, 1996–1999).
- Bobby Few, 85, American jazz pianist.
- Eldon Fortie, 79, American football player (BYU Cougars, Edmonton Eskimos).
- Donald Frith, 96, American ceramic artist and academic.
- Wiesław Glos, 84, Polish Olympic fencer (1960, 1964) and architect.
- Edward Gnat, 80, Polish politician, deputy (1985–1989, 1993–1997), COVID-19.
- Francis Hammel, 70, French politician, deputy (1997–2002).
- Jim Haynes, 87, American-British underground and avant-garde theatre producer, co-founder of the Traverse Theatre and International Times.
- Alfredo Hernández, 69, Mexican Olympic footballer (1972).
- Gerald Hiken, 93, American actor (Reds, Car 54, Where Are You?, Invitation to a Gunfighter).
- Laurence H. Kedes, 83, American scientist.
- Ludy Kissassunda, 88, Angolan general and politician.
- Ferdinand Kolarik, 83, Austrian footballer (Admira Wien, national team).
- John Land, 82, British Olympic field hockey player (1964), motor neurone disease.
- Jack Lihou, 90, Australian cricketer (Queensland).
- Danilo Lim, 65, Filipino military officer, chairman of the Metropolitan Manila Development Authority (since 2017), COVID-19.
- Alf Lomas, 92, British politician, MEP (1979–1999).
- Ken Mellor, 86, English footballer (Mansfield Town, Swindon Town).
- Pag-asa, 28, Filipino Philippine eagle, first to have been bred and hatched in captivity.
- Thanasis Papazoglou, 67, Greek footballer (PAS Giannina, national team).
- Kate Payne, 63, American nurse and bioethicist.
- Gord Renwick, 85, Canadian ice hockey administrator, president of CAHA (1977–1979) and vice-president of IIHF (1986–1994).
- Barry Schwartz, 82, American sociologist.
- Iulian Șerban, 35, Romanian paracanoeist, world champion (2010, 2011, 2012).
- Mehtab Singh, 73, Indian Olympic boxer.
- Victor Thulare III, 40, South African royal, king of the Pedi people (since 2020), COVID-19.
- Jim Townsend, 83, Irish politician, senator (1993–1997).
- Filip Trifonov, 73, Bulgarian actor (The Boy Turns Man, The Hare Census, A Nameless Band).
- Antonio Valdés, 91, Mexican actor (Club de Cuervos).
- Burt Wilson, 87, American philosopher, writer and jazz musician, COVID-19.

=== 7 ===
- María Paula Acevedo Guzmán, 88, Dominican activist, first lady (1965).
- Alex Apolinário, 24, Brazilian footballer (Alverca, Cruzeiro), cardiac arrest.
- Michael Apted, 79, English film director (Gorillas in the Mist, Coal Miner's Daughter, The World Is Not Enough).
- Michael G. Barbour, 78, American botanist.
- Val Bettin, 97, American actor (The Great Mouse Detective, Aladdin, Shrek).
- Jan Blommaert, 59, Belgian sociolinguist and linguistic anthropologist, cancer.
- Elanga Buala, 56, Papua New Guinean Olympic runner (1984).
- Biserka Cvejić, 97, Serbian opera singer.
- Deezer D, 55, American rapper and actor (ER, In the Mix, CB4), heart attack.
- Miriam DeCosta-Willis, 86, American educator and civil rights activist.
- Ronnie Ellenblum, 68, Israeli geographer and historian, heart failure.
- Ian Foreman, 90, Australian footballer (Footscray).
- Hussein Bakry Gazzaz, 95, Saudi Arabian cosmetics businessman.
- Grant Gondrezick, 57, American basketball player (Phoenix Suns, Los Angeles Clippers, Limoges CSP).
- Thomas Gumpert, 68, German actor (Verbotene Liebe, Lindenstraße, Polizeiruf 110).
- Connie Hall, 91, American country singer.
- John Heilpern, 78, British theatre critic and editor (The Observer, The New York Observer, Vanity Fair), lung cancer.
- Valeri Khlevinsky, 77, Russian actor (Big School-Break, Valentin and Valentina, Taxi Blues), People's Artist of Russia (2002).
- Taky Kimura, 96, American martial artist.
- Wilberforce Kisamba Mugerwa, 75, Ugandan agricultural economist and politician, MP (1980–1985, 1991–2004), COVID-19.
- Vladimir Kiselyov, 64, Ukrainian shot putter, Olympic champion (1980).
- Tom LaBonge, 67, American politician, member of the Los Angeles City Council (2001–2015), cardiac arrest.
- Genival Lacerda, 89, Brazilian forró singer, complications from COVID-19.
- Tommy Lasorda, 93, American Hall of Fame baseball manager (Los Angeles Dodgers) and player (Brooklyn Dodgers, Kansas City Athletics), heart failure.
- Christopher Little, 79, British literary agent, founder of Christopher Little Literary Agency.
- Cassim Louis, 73, Saint Lucian football manager (national team).
- Jamie O'Hara, 70, American country musician and songwriter ("Grandpa (Tell Me 'Bout the Good Old Days)", "Older Women"), Grammy winner (1987), cancer.
- Guy Péqueux, 78, French painter.
- Lonnie Perrin, 68, American football player (Denver Broncos, Chicago Bears, Washington Redskins).
- Dominique Rakotorahalahy, 76, Malagasy Olympic decathlete.
- Marion Ramsey, 73, American actress (Police Academy, Return to Babylon, Lavalantula) and singer.
- Carlos Rasch, 88, Brazilian science fiction author.
- Norberto James Rawlings, 75, Dominican poet, complications from Parkinson's disease.
- Adebayo Salami, 69, Nigerian politician, senator (1999–2003).
- Munira Yamin Satti, Pakistani politician, Punjab MPA (since 2018), COVID-19.
- Henri Schwery, 88, Swiss Roman Catholic cardinal, bishop of Sion (1977–1995).
- Neil Sheehan, 84, American journalist (The New York Times), Pulitzer Prize winner (1989), complications from Parkinson's disease.
- Brian Sicknick, 42, American police officer (U.S. Capitol Police).
- Solange, 69, Italian psychic and television personality.
- Reynaldo Umali, 63, Filipino politician, member of the House of Representatives (2010–2019), COVID-19.
- Mel Weitsman, 91, American Buddhist priest, founder of the Berkeley Zen Center.
- David Wheldon, 70, English writer and physician.

=== 8 ===
- Alda Alves de Melo dos Santos, São Tomé and Príncipe diplomat and politician.
- Paul Amargier, 96, French historian and Roman Catholic priest.
- Cástor Oswaldo Azuaje Pérez, 69, Venezuelan Roman Catholic prelate, bishop of Trujillo (since 2012), COVID-19.
- Eva Badura-Skoda, 91, Austrian musicologist.
- William H. Barbour Jr., 79, American jurist, judge (since 1983) and chief judge (1989–1996) of the U.S. District Court for Southern Mississippi.
- Harold Bornstein, 73, American gastroenterologist.
- Ken Bowen, 58, American football player (Atlanta Falcons).
- Eve Branson, 96, British philanthropist and child welfare advocate, COVID-19.
- Ed Bruce, 81, American singer-songwriter ("Mammas Don't Let Your Babies Grow Up to Be Cowboys", "You're the Best Break This Old Heart Ever Had") and actor (Bret Maverick).
- David Buchsbaum, 91, American mathematician, heart failure.
- Steve Carver, 75, American film director (Lone Wolf McQuade, Big Bad Mama, Capone), complications from COVID-19.
- John Corcoran, 83, American logician and philosopher.
- David Darling, 79, American cellist and composer.
- Květa Eretová, 94, Czech chess grandmaster.
- Michael Fonfara, 74, Canadian keyboardist (The Electric Flag, Downchild Blues Band, Rhinoceros), cancer.
- Marissa Garrido, 94, Mexican telenovela writer (La Leona), complications from COVID-19.
- Otto Geisert, 81, German footballer (Karlsruhe, Kaiserslautern).
- Emile Hemmen, 97, Luxembourgish novelist and poet, member of the Luxembourgish Patriot League resistance.
- Steve Hendrickson, 54, American football player (San Francisco 49ers, San Diego Chargers, Houston Oilers).
- Mike Henry, 84, American football player (Pittsburgh Steelers) and actor (Smokey and the Bandit, Tarzan and the Valley of Gold), Parkinson's disease and chronic traumatic encephalopathy.
- Peter W. Huber, 68, American lawyer and writer.
- Seth Abid Hussain, 85, Pakistani businessman and philanthropist.
- Norm Jary, 91, Canadian politician, mayor of Guelph (1970–1985).
- Werner Klumpp, 92, German politician, minister-president of the Saarland (1979).
- Barbara Köhler, 61, German poet.
- Marian Kondratowicz, 79, Polish footballer (Odra Opole).
- Steve Lightle, 61, American comic book artist (Legion of Super-Heroes, Doom Patrol, The Flash), complications from COVID-19.
- Colin McDonald, 92, Australian cricketer (Victoria, national team).
- Jay W. McGee, 71, American-Canadian musician, complications from COVID-19.
- Stewart McKnight, 85, New Zealand cricketer (Otago) and curler.
- José Méndez, 83, Spanish Olympic rower (1960).
- Diana Millay, 85, American actress (Street of Sinners, Dark Shadows, The Secret Storm).
- Dorine Mokha, 31, Congolese dancer, malaria.
- Samuel L. Myers Sr., 101, American economist and educationist, president of Bowie State University (1968–1977).
- Bill Nankeville, 95, British Olympic runner (1948, 1952).
- Oleg Negrobov, 79, Russian entomologist.
- Ivo Niederle, 91, Czech actor.
- Folabi Olumide, 81, Nigerian academic, vice-chancellor of Lagos State University (1983–1988).
- Wojciech Przybylski, 81, Polish football player (Broń Radom) and manager (Lechia Gdańsk, Al-Jaish).
- Deborah Rhode, 68, American legal scholar.
- Don Robertson, 92, American television announcer (CBS Sports).
- Grace Robertson, 90, British photographer.
- Michael Shaw, Baron Shaw of Northstead, 100, British politician and life peer, MP (1960–1964, 1966–1992).
- Rajkumar Jhalajit Singh, 96, Indian historian.
- Pamela Joy Spry, 96, Australian nurse.
- Igor Tõnurist, 73, Estonian ethnographer and folklorist.
- Vladimir Tretyakov, 84, Russian mathematician, rector (1993–2006) and president (since 2006) of Ural State University.
- Iancu Țucărman, 98, Romanian Holocaust survivor, COVID-19.
- Katharine Whitehorn, 92, English journalist (The Observer), complications from Alzheimer's disease.
- Shirley Wilson, 95, American football coach (Elon Phoenix, Duke Blue Devils).
- Xu Qinxian, 85, Chinese military officer and political dissident, choking.
- Zoffany, 12, Irish racehorse and sire, liver failure.

=== 9 ===
- Beddu Amang, 84, Indonesian economist, chairman of State Logistics Agency (1995–1998).
- Mehdi Attar-Ashrafi, 72, Iranian Olympic weightlifter (1976).
- Kenneth Barker, 86, British academic administrator, vice-chancellor of De Montfort University (1992–1999) and Thames Valley University (1999–2003).
- Harry Brüll, 85, Dutch footballer (Rapid JC Heerlen, Fortuna Sittard, national team).
- Antón Cancelas, 65, Spanish voice actor.
- Ed Culpepper, 86, American football player (Chicago/St. Louis Cardinals, Houston Oilers, Minnesota Vikings).
- Jerry Douglas, 85, American director and writer.
- František Filip, 90, Czech film director (Tři chlapi v chalupě, Chalupáři, Utrpení mladého Boháčka), COVID-19.
- Alec Gambling, 94, British electrical engineer.
- Patrick Gordon-Duff-Pennington, 90, British farmer and landowner (Muncaster Castle).
- Mohamud Mohammed Hassan, 24, British security guard.
- Barbara Hewson, 59, Irish barrister, pancreatic cancer.
- Isaak Khalatnikov, 101, Russian physicist (BKL singularity).
- James L. Larson, 89, American historian.
- Vivalyn Latty-Scott, 82, Jamaican cricketer (national team, West Indies team) and coach.
- Howard Liebengood, 51, American police officer (U.S. Capitol Police), suicide.
- John Lutz, 81, American mystery writer (SWF Seeks Same), complications of Lewy body dementia, Parkinson's disease, and COVID-19.
- Ved Mehta, 86, Indian novelist, complications from Parkinson's disease.
- Ken Middleditch, 95, British motorcycle speedway rider (Hastings Saxons, Poole Pirates, Swindon Robins).
- Johnson Mlambo, 80, South African political activist, complications from COVID-19.
- Anatolii Mokrousov, 77, Ukrainian politician, MP (1990–2006), COVID-19.
- Margaret Morrison, 66, Canadian philosopher of science, cancer.
- Jack Murphy, 88, American football player and coach.
- Ezra Nawi, 69, Israeli human rights activist, cancer.
- Hans Frede Nielsen, 77, Danish philologist.
- John Reilly, 86, American actor (General Hospital, Sunset Beach, Passions), heart attack.
- Llorenç Rifé, 82, Spanish football player (Barcelona, Deportivo de La Coruña).
- George Robertson, 93, Canadian ice hockey player (Montreal Canadiens), COVID-19.
- Rong Zi, 98, Chinese-Taiwanese writer and poet.
- John Joseph Ryba, 91, American politician, member of the Wisconsin State Assembly (1993–2003).
- Ken Sedd, 81, British television actor (The Benny Hill Show, Doctor Who, Z-Cars).
- Philip Seeman, 86, Canadian neuropharmacologist, muscle disease.
- Kathy Shaidle, 56, Canadian writer, cancer.
- Bruce W. Shore, 85, American theoretical physicist.
- Fabrizio Soccorsi, 78, Italian physician, Papal private doctor (since 2015), complications from cancer and COVID-19.
- Madhav Singh Solanki, 93, Indian politician, chief minister of Gujarat (1976–1977) and minister of External Affairs (1991–1992), cardiac arrest.
- Todd Stadtman, 59, American musician and writer.
- Mulyadi Tamsir, 39, Indonesian politician and student activist, chairman of the Muslim Students' Association (2015–2018), plane crash.
- Berta Taracena, 95–96, Mexican historian and art critic.
- Caroly Wilcox, 89, American puppeteer (The Muppet Show, Sesame Street, Fraggle Rock).
- Jeannette Wood, 88, American politician, member of the Washington House of Representatives (1988–1994) and Senate (1994–1999).

=== 10 ===
- Ahmet Vefik Alp, 72, Turkish architect and political advisor, heart attack.
- Graham Arthur, 84, Australian football player (Hawthorn, Victoria) and coach.
- Hubert Auriol, 68, French rally driver, Dakar Rally winner (1981, 1983, 1992), complications from COVID-19.
- Sir David Barclay, 86, British businessman.
- Joël Batteux, 77, French politician, mayor of Saint-Nazaire (1983–2014), complications from surgery.
- Louis-Pierre Bougie, 74, Canadian painter and engraver, pneumonia.
- Arthur Bramley, 91, English footballer (Mansfield Town).
- Harry Brown, 72, American basketball player (Oklahoma Sooners), diabetes.
- Michel Caffier, 90, French journalist and literary critic.
- Pedro Casado, 83, Spanish footballer (Real Madrid, Sabadell, national team).
- Tosh Chamberlain, 86, English footballer (Fulham, Dover Athletic, Gravesend and Northfleet).
- Avelino Chaves, 89, Spanish football player (Real Zaragoza) and executive.
- Adam Dyczkowski, 88, Polish Roman Catholic prelate and philosopher, bishop of Zielona Góra-Gorzów (1993–2007), COVID-19.
- Nancy Walker Bush Ellis, 94, American philanthropist, complications from COVID-19.
- Theo English, 90, Irish hurler (Marlfield, Tipperary).
- Kristen K. Flaa, 95, Norwegian politician, mayor of Aust-Agder (1972–1976).
- James Follett, 81, British writer (A Cage of Eagles).
- Tom Gannon, 77, American politician, member of the Pennsylvania House of Representatives (1979–2006).
- Bruno Ghedina, 77, Italian Olympic ice hockey player (1964), COVID-19.
- Pedro González, 83, Dominican baseball player (New York Yankees, Cleveland Indians).
- Tony Gregory, 83, English footballer (Luton Town, Watford).
- Ángel Sergio Guerrero Mier, 85, Mexican politician, governor of Durango (1998–2004).
- Robert Halley, 85, French politician and businessman.
- Betty Lou Holland, 95, American actress.
- Bobby Kellard, 77, English football player (Southend United, Portsmouth, Crystal Palace) and manager.
- Aminu Isa Kontagora, 64, Nigerian politician, administrator of Benue State (1996–1998) and Kano State (1998–1999), COVID-19.
- Robert L. Lennon, 87, American politician.
- Sonny Leonard, 77, American engine designer and builder.
- Christopher Maboulou, 30, French-Congolese footballer (Châteauroux, Bastia, PAS Giannina), heart attack.
- Geraldo Antônio Miotto, 65, Brazilian general, commander of the Amazon Military Command (2016–2018) and Southern Military Command (2018–2020), COVID-19.
- Behzad Moezi, 82, Iranian aviator, leukemia.
- Tahir Mughal, 43, Pakistani cricketer (Gujranwala, Allied Bank Limited, National Bank of Pakistan), gallbladder cancer.
- Josep Antoni Noya, 81, Spanish footballer (Sabadell, Atlético Madrid).
- Barry Oringer, 85, American television producer and screenwriter (Ben Casey, The Fugitive, Hotel).
- Georges Pernoud, 73, French journalist, television presenter and television producer.
- Wayne Radford, 64, American basketball player (Indiana Hoosiers, Indiana Pacers).
- Benita Raphan, 58, American filmmaker and designer.
- Dee Rowe, 91, American basketball coach (UConn Huskies), COVID-19 and cancer.
- Antonio Sabàto Sr., 77, Italian-American actor (Grand Prix, One Dollar Too Many, Shoot Twice), COVID-19.
- Donald Smith, 97, English cricketer (Sussex, national team).
- Julie Strain, 58, American actress (Heavy Metal 2000) and model (Penthouse, Heavy Metal), complications from dementia.
- David Stypka, 41, Czech singer-songwriter and guitarist, complications from pancreatic cancer and COVID-19.
- Walter Taibo, 89, Uruguayan footballer (Huracán, Nacional, national team).
- Mohammad Khaledur Rahman Tito, 75, Bangladeshi politician, MP (1986–1988, 2008–2014).
- Pala Thankam, 79, Indian actress (Rebecca, Gangasangamam, Ormakal Marikkumo).
- Thorleif Torstensson, 71, Swedish singer (Thorleifs), COVID-19.
- Naseer Turabi, 75, Indian-born Pakistani poet.
- Yeng Pway Ngon, 73, Singaporean writer and poet, prostate cancer.

=== 11 ===
- Massoud Achkar, 64, Lebanese military leader and politician, COVID-19.
- Sheldon Adelson, 87, American casino owner, founder of Las Vegas Sands, lymphoma.
- Vassilis Alexakis, 77, Greek-born French writer and translator.
- Guy Auffray, 75, French judoka.
- Éric Babin, 61, New Caledonian politician, member of the Congress (1995–1999), traffic collision.
- Aaron Barlow, 69, American scholar.
- Edward Beard, 80, American politician, member of the Rhode Island House of Representatives (1972–1974) and U.S. House of Representatives (1975–1981), Parkinson's disease.
- Joseph Berke, 81, American-born English psychotherapist and author, heart failure.
- Roger Cayrel, 95, French astronomer.
- José Centenera, 89, Spanish Olympic equestrian (1960).
- Shashikumar Chitre, 84, Indian mathematician and astrophysicist.
- Lloyd Cowan, 58, British hurdler and track coach.
- Étienne Draber, 81, French actor (May Fools, Madame Bovary, House of D), COVID-19.
- Fabio Enzo, 74, Italian footballer (Roma, Cesena, Novara), complications from COVID-19.
- Yousef Ghawanmeh, 85, Jordanian historian.
- Lionel Gossman, 91, Scottish-American literary scholar.
- Ron Grigg, 92, British chemist.
- Ian Griggs, 92, British Anglican prelate, bishop of Ludlow (1987–1994).
- Ronald J. Hays, 92, American admiral.
- Kathleen Heddle, 55, Canadian rower, Olympic champion (1992, 1996), breast and lymph node cancer.
- Howard Johnson, 79, American jazz musician.
- Mark Keds, 50, English singer (Senseless Things, Deadcuts), chronic obstructive pulmonary disease.
- David Khakhaleishvili, 49, Georgian judoka, Olympic champion (1992), heart disease.
- Gothard Kokott, 77, Polish football manager (Raków Częstochowa, Ruch Radzionków).
- Paul Kölliker, 88, Swiss Olympic rower (1960), COVID-19.
- Rada Lysenko, 99, Ukrainian pianist and pedagogue, People's Artist of Ukraine.
- Bogdan Macovei, 67, Romanian handball manager (women's national team, Macedonia women's national team).
- Johanna Maluleke, South African politician, member of the National Assembly (2009–2016), COVID-19.
- Jean-Marie Marconot, 82, French sociolinguist.
- Mario Masuku, 69, Swazi politician.
- Tetsuo Najita, 84, American historian.
- Lindiwe Ndlovu, 44, South African actress (Little One, EHostela).
- Kurt Oddekalv, 63, Norwegian environmentalist, founder of Green Warriors of Norway, drowning.
- Francis Perekamoya, 63, Malawian economist, governor of the Reserve Bank of Malawi (1992–1995), COVID-19.
- Tord Peterson, 94, Swedish actor (Honeymoon, House of Angels, Echoes from the Dead).
- Luis Adriano Piedrahíta Sandoval, 74, Colombian Roman Catholic prelate, bishop of Apartadó (2007–2014) and Santa Marta (since 2014), COVID-19.
- Turlapaty Kutumba Rao, 87, Indian writer and orator.
- Oscar Rizzato, 92, Italian Roman Catholic titular bishop, COVID-19.
- Prentice Earl Sanders, 83, American police officer, chief of the San Francisco Police Department (2002–2003).
- Benoît Sinzogan, 90, Beninese military officer and politician, minister of foreign affairs (1967–1968) and member of the Military Directorate (1969–1970).
- Margo St. James, 83, American women's rights activist and sex worker.
- Paul Taylor, 81, American engineer.
- Howard Teten, 88, American FBI instructor, complications from COVID-19.
- William E. Thornton, 91, American astronaut (Challenger).
- Stacy Title, 56, American film director (The Bye Bye Man, The Last Supper, Hood of Horror), complications from amyotrophic lateral sclerosis.
- Gerrit van Rensburg, 72, South African politician and farmer, Member of the Western Cape Provincial Parliament (1999–2014), Western Cape Minister of Agriculture (1999–2001, 2009–2014), cancer.
- Ganesh Shankar Vidyarthi, 96, Indian independence activist and politician, Bihar MLA (1977–1985) and MLC (1990–1996), COVID-19.

=== 12 ===
- Gerald Achee, 68, Trinidadian drummer, cancer.
- Frank Arok, 88, Serbian-Australian football player (FK Jedinstvo) and manager (St George Saints, Australia national team).
- Lingson Belekanyama, Malawian politician, minister of local government and rural development (since 2020), COVID-19.
- Bruce Bennett, 77, American Canadian football player (Saskatchewan Roughriders), pneumonia and COVID-19.
- Barrie Chaplin, 96, British engineer and inventor.
- Joseph F. Crangle, 88, American lawyer and politician.
- Florentin Crihălmeanu, 61, Romanian Greek Catholic hierarch, bishop of Cluj-Gherla (since 2002), COVID-19.
- Wim de Graaff, 89, Dutch Olympic speed skater (1956, 1960) and coach.
- Cecil Humphery-Smith, 92, British genealogist and heraldist.
- Carlos Joseph, 40, American football player (San Diego Chargers, Manchester Wolves), ruptured brain aneurysm.
- Sid Lerner, 90, American advertising executive, founder of Meatless Monday.
- Tim Lester, 52, American football player (Los Angeles Rams, Pittsburgh Steelers, Dallas Cowboys), COVID-19.
- Fred Levin, 83, American lawyer, COVID-19.
- Mona Malm, 85, Swedish actress (Heja Roland!, Fanny and Alexander, The Tattooed Widow).
- Per Martinsen, 84, Norwegian footballer (Lisleby, Fredrikstad, national team).
- Álvaro Mejía, 80, Colombian Olympic long-distance runner (1964, 1968, 1972).
- Sidik Mia, 55, Malawian politician, MP (2004–2014), minister of defence (2009–2010) and transport and public works (since 2020), COVID-19.
- Willie Miller, 70, Scottish urban planner.
- Theodoros Mitras, 72, Greek politician, MP (1993–1996).
- Christopher P. Monkhouse, 73, American architectural historian, stroke.
- Jim Norton, 78, American football player (San Francisco 49ers, Atlanta Falcons, Washington Redskins).
- Osvaldo Peredo, 79, Bolivian revolutionary (Ñancahuazú Guerrilla).
- Philaret, 85, Belarusian Orthodox prelate, metropolitan of Minsk and Slutsk (1978–2013), leader of the Belarusian Orthodox Church (1990–2013), COVID-19.
- John G. Ramsay, 89, British structural geologist.
- Bridget Rowe, 70, British journalist, editor of Sunday Mirror (1991–1992, 1997–1998), The People (1992–1996), COVID-19.
- Khalid bin Abdullah Al Saud, 84, Saudi royal, conglomerate magnate (Mawarid Holding) and horse stable owner (Juddmonte).
- Liudmyla Semykina, 97, Ukrainian painter.
- Shingoose, 74, Canadian folk musician, COVID-19.
- João Henrique de Souza, 78, Brazilian politician, Paraíba MLA (since 2007), COVID-19.
- Yuval Stonis, 37, Israeli actor and screenwriter, stomach cancer.
- Keith Valigura, 63, American politician, member of the Texas House of Representatives (1985–1991).
- John Ward, 83, New Zealand cricketer (Canterbury, national team).
- Robert Warke, 90, Irish Anglican prelate, bishop of Cork, Cloyne and Ross (1988–1998).
- Dame Margaret Weston, 94, British museum curator, director of the Science Museum (1973–1986).

=== 13 ===
- Howard Andrew, 86, American poker player.
- Tim Bogert, 76, American rock bassist (Vanilla Fudge, Beck, Bogert & Appice, Cactus), cancer.
- Duke Bootee, 69, American rapper and songwriter ("The Message"), heart failure.
- Nicky Booth, 40, British boxer.
- Mario Cecchini, 87, Italian Roman Catholic prelate, bishop of Fano-Fossombrone-Cagli-Pergola (1986–1998), COVID-19.
- Borivoje Cenić, 90, Serbian basketball player (Radnički Belgrade) and coach (OKK Beograd, Apollon Patras).
- Patrick Chapuis, 71, French photographer.
- Sir Robert Cohan, 95, American-born British dancer and choreographer, founder of The Place, London Contemporary Dance School, and LCDT.
- Frank J. Coppa, 83, American historian and author.
- Gerry Cottle, 75, British circus owner and presenter, COVID-19.
- Siegfried Fischbacher, 81, German-American magician and entertainer (Siegfried & Roy), pancreatic cancer.
- Benjamin F. Gibson, 89, American jurist, judge (1979–1999) and chief judge (1991–1995) of the U.S. District Court for Western Michigan.
- Gimax, 83, Italian racing driver.
- Henri Goraïeb, 85, Lebanese pianist.
- Michel Gravel, 84, Canadian photographer.
- Moses Hamungole, 53, Zambian Roman Catholic prelate, bishop of Monze (since 2014), COVID-19.
- Ben Hines, 85, American baseball coach (Los Angeles Dodgers).
- Ken Jones, 70, American LGBT rights activist, bladder cancer.
- Bernd Kannenberg, 78, German race walker, Olympic champion (1972).
- Ndubuisi Kanu, 77, Nigerian rear admiral and politician, military governor of Imo State (1976–1977) and Lagos State (1977–1978).
- Gail Kopplin, 81, American politician, member of the Nebraska Legislature (2005–2009).
- Fiu Loimata II, 79, Samoan politician, MP (1996–2001).
- Norman MacLeod, 93, Canadian financier and politician, president of the Liberal Party (1980–1982).
- Don Mason, 86, British immunologist.
- Seyoum Mesfin, 71, Ethiopian politician and diplomat, minister of foreign affairs (1991–2010) and ambassador to China (2011–2017), shot.
- Bryan Monroe, 55, American journalist (CNN, Ebony, Jet), heart attack.
- Nelson Nieves, 86, Venezuelan Olympic fencer (1952).
- Sinikka Nopola, 67, Finnish writer (Ricky Rapper).
- Norodom Yuvaneath, 77, Cambodian prince, privy counsellor (1993–2004) and supreme royal advisor (since 2004).
- Ben Nsibandze, 89, Swazi politician, acting prime minister (1979).
- Mircea Păcurariu, 88, Romanian theologian.
- Bruce Pasternack, 73, American businessman and philanthropist, president of the Special Olympics (2005–2007).
- Devarapalli Prakash Rao, 62, Indian social worker, COVID-19.
- Joël Robert, 77, Belgian motocross racer, six-time world champion, COVID-19.
- Øyvind Sandberg, 67, Norwegian film director.
- Marielle de Sarnez, 69, French politician, MEP (1999–2017), minister in charge of European affairs (2017), and deputy (since 2017), leukemia.
- Eusébio Scheid, 88, Brazilian Roman Catholic cardinal, archbishop of São Sebastião do Rio de Janeiro (2001–2009), COVID-19.
- Safwat El-Sherif, 87, Egyptian politician, minister of information (1981–2004) and speaker of the Shura Council (2004–2011), leukemia.
- Folarin Shyllon, 80, Nigerian lawyer.
- Tony Spaeth, 86, American corporate identity planner.
- Sylvain Sylvain, 69, Egyptian-born American guitarist (New York Dolls), cancer.
- Philip Tartaglia, 70, Scottish Roman Catholic prelate, metropolitan archbishop of Glasgow (since 2012), COVID-19.
- Abay Tsehaye, 67, Ethiopian politician, co-founder of the Marxist–Leninist League of Tigray, shot.
- Maguito Vilela, 71, Brazilian lawyer and politician, governor of Goiás (1995–1998), senator (1999–2007) and mayor-elect of Goiânia (since 2021), COVID-19.
- Hannes Viljoen, 77, South African rugby union player (Natal, national team).
- Timothy Whidborne, 93, British artist.

=== 14 ===
- James B. Anderson, 85, American chemist and physicist.
- Melanio Asensio, 84, Spanish Olympic sprinter (1960).
- Veronica Beechey, 75, British feminist sociologist and patients' rights advocate.
- Carlos Armando Biebrich, 81, Mexican lawyer and politician, deputy (1967–1970) and governor of Sonora (1973–1975), COVID-19.
- Cliff Burvill, 83, Australian Olympic cyclist (1956), fall.
- José Luis Caballero, 65, Mexican Olympic footballer (1976).
- Storm Constantine, 64, British fantasy and science fiction author (Sea Dragon Heir, Grigori Trilogy).
- Simon Crosse, 90, British Olympic rower (1960).
- Todd Gabbett, 78, American football player (Illinois, Virginia Sailors) and coach.
- Boris Grachevsky, 71, Russian film director, screenwriter and actor (Yeralash), COVID-19.
- Vicente Alejandro Guillamón, 90, Spanish journalist.
- Eiji Hashimoto, 89, Japanese-American harpsichordist.
- Sheikh Ali Jaber, 44, Saudi-born Indonesian Islamic cleric.
- Corey Johnson, 52, American convicted murderer, execution by lethal injection.
- Shirley Johnson, 83, American politician, member of the Michigan House of Representatives (1981–1992, 1993–1998) and Senate (1999–2004).
- John LaRose, 69, American baseball player (Boston Red Sox), COVID-19.
- Vincent Logan, 79, Scottish Roman Catholic prelate, bishop of Dunkeld (1981–2012), COVID-19.
- Dale Rogers Marshall, 83, American political scientist and academic administrator, complications from COVID-19.
- Harold Lawrence McPheeters, 97, American psychiatrist.
- Brian Moller, 85, Irish Anglican priest, dean of Connor (1998–2001).
- Elijah Moshinsky, 75, Australian opera, theatre, and television director, COVID-19.
- Evžen Neustupný, 87, Czech archaeologist.
- Aleksandr Nikitin, 59, Russian football player (Torpedo Volzhsky, SKA Rostov-on-Don, Rotor Volgograd) and manager.
- Leonidas Pelekanakis, 58, Greek Olympic sailor (1984, 2000, 2004), COVID-19.
- Yrjö Rantanen, 70, Finnish chess grandmaster.
- Peter Mark Richman, 93, American actor (Dynasty, Friday the 13th Part VIII: Jason Takes Manhattan, Poolhall Junkies).
- Joanne Rogers, 92, American musician.
- David Roth, 68, American magician.
- Éamonn Ryan, 79, Irish Gaelic football player (Glenville, UCC) and manager (Cork).
- Ron Samford, 90, American baseball player (New York Giants, Detroit Tigers, Washington Senators).
- Jane Sinclair, 64, British Anglican priest, canon of Westminster (2014–2020).
- Jember Teferra, 77, Malagasy-born Ethiopian community development worker.
- Jan de Vries, 77, Dutch motorcycle racer, cardiac arrest.
- Larry Willoughby, 70, American country singer-songwriter ("Building Bridges", "Operator, Operator") and music executive, vice-president of A&R at Capitol Records, COVID-19.
- Dinesh Chandra Yadav, Nepalese politician, member of the Constituent Assembly (2014–2017), COVID-19.
- Roman Zakharov, 91, Russian Olympic rower (1952).

=== 15 ===
- William R. Allen, 96, American economist.
- Dale Baer, 70, American animator (The Lion King, Who Framed Roger Rabbit, Robin Hood), complications from amyotrophic lateral sclerosis.
- Sjarifuddin Baharsjah, 89, Indonesian academic and politician, minister of agriculture (1993–1998).
- Geoff Barnett, 74, English footballer (Everton, Arsenal, Minnesota Kicks), complications from COVID-19.
- Liz Berube, 78, American comic book artist (Young Love, Aquaman, Plastic Man).
- Ali Brakchi, 86, French Olympic long jumper.
- Harvey Branch, 83, American baseball player (St. Louis Cardinals).
- Wilbur Brotherton, 98, American politician, member of the Michigan House of Representatives (1975–1988).
- Michael Bryce, 82, Australian architect and graphic designer, spouse of the governor-general (2008–2014).
- Vicente Cantatore, 85, Argentine football player (San Lorenzo, Tigre) and manager (Real Valladolid).
- Rosalind Cartwright, 98, American neuroscientist.
- Tyrone Crawley, 62, American boxer.
- Dalakhani, 21, Irish racehorse and sire.
- Elizam Escobar, 72, Puerto Rican art theorist, poet, and political activist, cancer.
- Gildardo García, 66, Colombian chess grandmaster, COVID-19.
- B. S. Gnanadesikan, 71, Indian politician, MP (2001–2013).
- James Gustafson, 95, American theological ethicist.
- Alan Hart, 85, British television executive, controller of BBC1 (1981–1984).
- Bruce Headley, 86, American thoroughbred trainer (Kona Gold, Got Koko), stroke.
- Michael Kelly, 91, Irish Jesuit priest and missionary.
- Kathleen Krull, 68, American children's writer and book editor, cancer.
- Eddie Kuligowski, 74, French photographer.
- Ramji Lal, 88, Indian politician, MP (1992–1993, 1994–2000).
- Mark Langham, 60, British Roman Catholic priest.
- Lệ Thu, 77, Vietnamese-American singer, COVID-19.
- Tiit Lilleorg, 79, Estonian actor (Agent Wild Duck, Autumn Ball, O2), COVID-19.
- Thomas V. Miller Jr., 78, American politician, member of the Maryland House of Delegates (1971–1975) and Senate (1975–2020), president of the Senate (1987–2020), prostate cancer.
- Kamal Morarka, 74, Indian businessman and politician, MP (1988–1994).
- Baaron Pittenger, 95, American ice hockey administrator.
- J. R. Rhodes Jr., 81, American politician.
- Benjamin de Rothschild, 57, French banker, heart attack.
- J. Michael Schweder, 71, American politician, member of the Pennsylvania House of Representatives (1975–1980).
- Olav M. Skulberg, 90, Norwegian limnologist.
- Jeffrey L. Smith, 35, American police officer (D.C. Metropolitan Police), suicide by gunshot.
- Paola Veneroni, 99, Italian actress (Maddalena, Zero for Conduct).
- Anatoliy Vishnevskiy, 85, Russian economist and demographer.
- Mihajlo Vuković, 76, Serbian basketball player (Sloboda Tuzla) and coach (Valencia Basket, Yugoslavia women's national team).
- Jon Westling, 78, American educator, president of Boston University (1996–2002).
- Jerry Wiegert, 76, American automotive businessman and engineer, founder of Vector Motors.
- James White, 78, American politician, member of the New Mexico House of Representatives (2009–2015), and Senate (since 2016).
- Bill Whitehead, 89, New Zealand sports administrator.

=== 16 ===
- Salleh Abas, 91, Malaysian judge and politician, Lord President of the Supreme Court (1984–1988) and Terengganu MLA (1999–2004), COVID-19.
- Ernest Ako, 97, Ghanaian police officer, inspector general of police (1974–1978).
- Jon Arnett, 85, American Hall of Fame football player (USC Trojans, Los Angeles Rams), heart failure.
- Sharon Begley, 64, American science journalist.
- Mahaveer Bhagora, 73, Indian politician, MP (2004–2009), COVID-19.
- Jerry Brandt, 82, American club owner and manager (The Ritz), COVID-19 and pneumonia.
- Charlotte Cornwell, 71, English actress (Dressing for Breakfast, The Saint, White Hunter Black Heart), cancer.
- Choi Jeongrye, 65, South Korean poet.
- Juan Carlos Copes, 89, Argentine tango dancer and choreographer, COVID-19.
- Chris Cramer, 73, British news journalist and executive (BBC News, CNN International), cancer.
- Little Walter DeVenne, 73, American radio host, COVID-19.
- Einar Eriksen, 87, Norwegian newspaper editor, chief editor of Bergens Tidende (1986–1991).
- Alice Gibson, 97, Belizean librarian.
- György Handel, 61, Hungarian footballer (MTK-VM, Rába ETO, national team), COVID-19.
- Bill Heal, 86, British soil scientist.
- Dustin Higgs, 48, American convicted murderer, execution by lethal injection.
- Xavier Hunault, 97, French politician, deputy (1962–1993).
- Bob Langas, 90, American football player (Baltimore Colts).
- Mona Lohanda, 73, Indonesian historian, archivist and academic, heart attack.
- Jim MacGeorge, 92, American voice actor (Bionic Six, Captain Caveman and the Teen Angels, Clue Club).
- Pave Maijanen, 70, Finnish musician (Hurriganes, Dingo), complications from amyotrophic lateral sclerosis.
- George von Mallinckrodt, 90, German merchant banker, chairman of Schroders (1984–1995).
- Sergi Mingote, 49, Spanish mountain climber and politician, mayor of Parets del Vallès (2011–2018), mountaineering fall.
- Steve Molnar, 73, Canadian football player (Saskatchewan Roughriders).
- Claudia Montero, 58, Argentine classical composer, Latin Grammy winner (2014, 2016, 2018), cancer.
- Chris Murphy, 66, Australian talent manager (INXS, Models), lymphoma.
- Carlo Nayaradou, 63, French-Martinican comic book author.
- Petrica Novosel Žic, 89, Croatian cartographer and academic.
- Bheki Ntuli, 63, South African politician, MP (1999–2003), COVID-19.
- Meghrig Parikian, 53, Armenian Apostolic prelate, bishop of Canada (since 2014).
- Farida Pasha, 68, Indonesian actress (Misteri Gunung Merapi), COVID-19.
- Phương Mai, 83, Vietnamese princess.
- Jimmy Powell, 85, American golfer, kidney failure.
- Sergei Rodin, 39, Russian footballer (CSKA Moscow, Sportakademklub Moscow, Sokol Saratov).
- Om Prakash Sharma, 87, Indian politician, Uttar Pradesh MLC (1972–2020), dysentery.
- David Shaw-Smith, 81, Irish film director (Hands).
- Phil Spector, 81, American Hall of Fame record producer (Wall of Sound), musician (The Teddy Bears), and convicted murderer, founder of Philles Records, COVID-19.
- Muammer Sun, 88, Turkish composer, multiple organ dysfunction syndrome.
- Sayidiman Suryohadiprojo, 93, Indonesian military officer and diplomat, deputy chief of staff of the Army (1973–1974).
- Arturo Tizón, 36, Spanish motorcycle racer, mountain bike fall.
- Pedro Trebbau, 91, German-born Venezuelan zoologist.
- Paul Varelans, 51, American mixed martial artist (UFC), COVID-19.
- Lars Westman, 86, Swedish writer.

=== 17 ===
- Nikolay Antoshkin, 78, Russian military officer (Chernobyl disaster), Hero of the Soviet Union, deputy (since 2014), COVID-19.
- Dave Arnold, 49, American politician, member of the Pennsylvania State Senate (since 2020), brain cancer.
- Keith Arnold, 94, British Anglican prelate, bishop of Warwick (1980–1990).
- Jacques Bral, 72, French film director (Black Really Suits You) and screenwriter.
- Manford Byrd Jr., 92, American academic administrator, superintendent of Chicago Public Schools (1985–1989).
- Luis María Cassoni, 82, Argentine politician and pharmacist, governor of Misiones Province (1987), COVID-19.
- Joevana Charles, 66, Seychellois politician, member of the National Assembly (1993–2016).
- Robert Cheezic, 82, American Tang Soo Do practitioner, complications from COVID-19.
- Brian Christie, American news host and journalist (CNN, WRAU-TV Peoria, WCVB-TV Boston).
- Camille Cléroux, 67, Canadian serial killer.
- Giles Constable, 91, British historian.
- Víctor Crisólogo, 68, Peruvian politician, congressman (2011–2016), COVID-19.
- Abel Gabuza, 65, South African Roman Catholic prelate, archbishop coadjutor of Durban (since 2018) and bishop of Kimberley (2010–2018), COVID-19.
- Barbara Gronemus, 89, American politician, member of the Wisconsin State Assembly (1982–2008).
- Muriel Grossfeld, 80, American Olympic gymnast (1956, 1960, 1964).
- Ghulam Mustafa Khan, 89, Indian classical singer.
- Kurofune, 22, American-bred Japanese Thoroughbred racehorse.
- Marlin Kuykendall, 86, American politician, mayor of Prescott, Arizona (2009–2015).
- David Lea, 85, Australian politician, Victoria MLA (1985–1992).
- Gerald Locklin, 79, American poet and lecturer, COVID-19.
- Roger Machin, 94, French football referee.
- Junior Mance, 92, American jazz pianist and educator.
- Jubril Martins-Kuye, 78, Nigerian politician, minister of commerce and industry (2010–2011).
- Haydn Morris, 92, Welsh rugby union player (Cardiff, British & Irish Lions, national team), fall.
- Sammy Nestico, 96, American jazz composer and arranger.
- Tom Prebble, 75, British-born New Zealand educationalist and university administrator (Massey University).
- Vincent M. Rizzotto, 89, American Roman Catholic prelate, auxiliary bishop of Galveston–Houston (2001–2006).
- József Sas, 82, Hungarian stage actor, comedian and theatre director, COVID-19.
- K. G. Shankar, 70, Indian politician, Puducherry MLA (since 2017), cardiac arrest.
- Jon Sullivan, 70, Australian politician, Queensland MLA (1989–1998) and MP (2007–2010).
- Marius Swart, 79, South African politician, executive mayor of the George Local Municipality (2000–2004) and MP (2004–2014), COVID-19.
- Vicent Tur, 62, Spanish politician, member of the Parliament of the Balearic Islands (1984–1987, 1991–2007), cancer.
- Joan Eloi Vila, 61, Spanish guitarist.
- Richard Vogt, 71, American herpetologist.
- Maynard Wallace, 77, American politician, member of the Missouri House of Representatives (2003–2011).
- Philip Wilson, 70, Australian Roman Catholic prelate, archbishop of Adelaide (2001–2018).
- Liane Winter, 78, German long-distance runner.
- Willis A. Wood, 99, American biochemist.

=== 18 ===
- Harry Abend, 83, Polish-born Venezuelan sculptor and architect.
- Jean-Pierre Bacri, 69, Algerian-born French actor (Same Old Song, Place Vendôme) and screenwriter (The Taste of Others), cancer.
- Perry Botkin Jr., 87, American composer and musician (Happy Days, Mork & Mindy, "Nadia's Theme"), Grammy winner (1978).
- Carlos Burga, 68, Peruvian Olympic boxer (1972), COVID-19.
- Alberto Cantù, 70, Italian musicologist and musical critic.
- Volodymyr Chernyak, 79, Ukrainian politician, MP (1998–2006), COVID-19.
- Jean Dumont, 90, French politician, senator (1986–1995).
- Ash Gardiner, 74, New Zealand rugby union player (Taranaki, national team).
- Svavar Gestsson, 76, Icelandic politician and diplomat, minister of social affairs (1980–1983), ambassador to Sweden (2001–2005) and Denmark (2005–2012).
- Andy Gray, 61, Scottish actor (River City, Naked Video), COVID-19.
- James D. Heiple, 87, American jurist, justice (1990–2000) and chief justice (1997) of the Supreme Court of Illinois, brain hemorrhage.
- Nombulelo Hermans, 51, South African politician, member of the National Assembly (since 2019), COVID-19.
- Joyce Hill, 95, American baseball player (South Bend Blue Sox, Peoria Redwings, Racine Belles).
- Alan J. Hoffman, 96, American mathematician (Hoffman–Singleton graph).
- Sinclair Hood, 103, British archaeologist, director of the British School at Athens (1980–1997).
- Tony Ingle, 68, American basketball coach (BYU Cougars, Kennesaw State Owls, Dalton State Roadrunners), COVID-19.
- Thorsten Johansson, 70, Swedish Olympic sprinter (1976).
- Lubomir Kavalek, 77, Czech-American Hall of Fame chess grandmaster.
- Maria Koterbska, 96, Polish singer.
- Ákos Kriza, 55, Hungarian health economist and politician, mayor of Miskolc (2010–2019).
- Joshua Kyeremeh, Ghanaian politician, kidney complications.
- Richard Lindheim, 81, American television producer and writer.
- Jack London, 83, American information technology executive, chairman of the board of CACI International Inc.
- Stephen Lungu, 78, Zimbabwean evangelist, COVID-19.
- Josep Mestres Quadreny, 91, Spanish composer.
- Chuck Mills, 92, American football coach (Utah State, Southern Oregon), pneumonia and organ failure.
- Vic Mitchell, 86, British railway preservationist and writer.
- Dündar Ali Osman, 90, Turkish royal, head of the House of Osman (since 2017).
- Henryk Ostrowski, 60, Polish politician and farmer, deputy (2001–2005).
- Winfield Parker, 78, American soul and gospel singer-songwriter, complications from COVID-19.
- V. Doraswamy Raju, 74, Indian film producer (Seetharamayya Gari Manavaralu, Annamayya) and politician, Andhra Pradesh MLA (1994–1999), cardiac arrest.
- Catherine Rich, 88, French actress.
- David Richardson, 65, American television writer and producer (The Simpsons, Two and a Half Men, F Is for Family), heart failure.
- Francisco Daniel Rivera Sánchez, 65, Mexican Roman Catholic prelate, auxiliary bishop of Mexico (since 2020), COVID-19.
- Jimmie Rodgers, 87, American pop singer ("Honeycomb", "Kisses Sweeter than Wine", "Secretly").
- Donald E. Ross, 90, American engineer.
- John Russell, 66, English guitarist.
- Dani Shmulevich-Rom, 80, Israeli footballer (Maccabi Haifa, national team), cancer.
- Gatot Sudjito, 60, Indonesian politician, MP (since 2014), COVID-19.
- Juan Carlos Tabío, 77, Cuban film director (Strawberry and Chocolate, Lista de Espera, 7 Days in Havana).
- Kees Teer, 95, Dutch electrical engineer, director of Philips Natuurkundig Laboratorium (1968–1985).
- John A. Thorpe, 84, American mathematician.
- K. V. Vijayadas, 61, Indian politician, Kerala MLA (since 2011), cerebral haemorrhage.
- Nancy Wilkie, 78, American archaeologist.

=== 19 ===
- Habibullah Abdurazzaq, 83, Tajik actor (Ilya Muromets).
- Michael Abraham, 89, English chemist.
- Ron Anthony, 87, American jazz guitarist and singer.
- Abdulkarim Al-Arhabi, 70, Yemeni politician.
- John G. Bartlett, 83, American physician and medical researcher, pneumonia.
- Morice Benin, 73, French singer.
- Ginette Bucaille, 94, French tennis player, 1954 French Championships finalist.
- Mujibur Rahman Dilu, 69, Bangladeshi actor (Songsoptok), pneumonia.
- William Fey, 78, American Roman Catholic prelate, bishop of Kimbe (2010–2019), COVID-19.
- Gordon Galley, 90, English footballer (Darlington, Sheffield Wednesday) and police officer.
- Louis Giani, 86, American Olympic wrestler (1960).
- Lou Goetz, 74, American basketball coach (Richmond Spiders), cancer.
- Renita Grigoryeva, 89, Russian film director, screenwriter (Boys) and actress (There Is Such a Lad).
- Brian Hillery, 83, Irish politician, senator (1977–1982, 1983–1989, 1992–1997) and TD (1989–1992).
- Roberta Hodes, 93, American screenwriter (Lad, a Dog) and script supervisor (On the Waterfront, The King of Comedy).
- W. John Hutchins, 81, English linguist.
- Danial Jahić, 41, Serbian Olympic long jumper (2000), COVID-19.
- Daniel Kobialka, 77, American violinist.
- Lâm Quang Thi, 88, Vietnamese military officer (ARVN), COVID-19.
- Narendra Luther, 88, Indian writer and civil servant.
- Emanuele Macaluso, 96, Italian trade unionist, journalist and politician, deputy (1963–1976) and senator (1976–1992), editor-in-chief of L'Unità (1982–1986), complications from a fall.
- Cesare Maestri, 91, Italian mountaineer and writer.
- Enrique Marcatili, 95, Argentine-American physicist.
- Mieko Nagaoka, 106, Japanese swimmer, respiratory failure.
- James L. Nagle, 83, American architect (Chicago Seven), complications from Alzheimer's disease.
- Diana O'Hehir, 98, American poet and author.
- Gustavo Peña, 78, Mexican football player (Monterrey, national team) and manager (Leones Negros), COVID-19.
- Toleafoa Ken Vaafusuaga Poutoa, 53, Samoan politician, MP (since 2016).
- Felipe Quispe, 78, Bolivian Quechua politician, Indigenous rights activist and peasant leader (CSUTCB), deputy (2002–2004), cardiac arrest.
- Ding Schoonmaker, 87, American sailor.
- V. Shanta, 93, Indian oncologist, director of the Adyar Cancer Institute (1980–1997), heart attack.
- Zdeněk Sternberg, 97, Czech aristocrat, Medal of Merit recipient.
- Don Sutton, 75, American Hall of Fame baseball player (Los Angeles Dodgers, California Angels, Milwaukee Brewers) and broadcaster, cancer.
- Carlos Tapia García, 79, Peruvian politician, congressman (1985–1990) and member of the Truth and Reconciliation Commission (2001–2003), COVID-19.
- Jack Turley, 93, American screenwriter (General Hospital, Hawaii Five-O, The Man from U.N.C.L.E.).
- Jim Vickerman, 89, American politician, member of the Minnesota Senate (1987–2011).
- Ellinah Wamukoya, 69, Swazi Anglican prelate, bishop of Eswatini (since 2012), COVID-19.
- Bob Williams, 89, American basketball player (Minneapolis Lakers, Harlem Globetrotters).
- Mark Wilson, 91, American magician and author.
- Zague, 86, Brazilian footballer (Botafogo, Corinthians, América).
- Giovanni Zucchi, 89, Italian rower, Olympic bronze medalist (1960).

=== 20 ===
- Raisuddin Ahmed, 82, Bangladeshi cricket player (Dhaka University) and administrator, COVID-19.
- Hagop S. Akiskal, 77, Lebanese-born American psychiatrist.
- Bridgette Barry, 63, American biophysicist and biochemist.
- Jaume Bassó, 91, Spanish basketball player (Club Joventut Badalona, national team).
- Dinesh Chandra Bhandary, 86, Indian military officer.
- Vorsila Bohrer, 89, American ethnobotanist.
- Doug Bowden, 93, New Zealand cricketer (Central Districts).
- Claude Bremond, 91–92, French semiologist.
- David Brewster, 56, British politician, member of the Northern Ireland Forum (1996–1998), heart attack.
- Sir Keith Bright, 89, British transport executive, chairman of London Regional Transport.
- Aslan Byutukayev, 46, Russian Islamic militant, commander of Riyad-us Saliheen Brigade of Martyrs (since 2010), shot.
- Marion Colthorpe, 87, British historian.
- Peter Forster, 86, British wood engraver and printmaker.
- Mira Furlan, 65, Croatian-American actress (Babylon 5, Lost, The Abandoned), complications from West Nile virus.
- Richard Hancock, 80, American politician.
- Joyce Hearn, 91, American politician, member of South Carolina House of Representatives (1975–1990).
- John Jeffers, 52, English footballer (Port Vale, Shrewsbury Town, Stockport County).
- Pam Johnson, 74, American newspaper editor, dementia.
- John Baptist Kaggwa, 77, Ugandan Roman Catholic prelate, bishop of Masaka (1998–2019), COVID-19.
- Bud Lea, 92, American sportswriter.
- Justin Lekhanya, 82, Lesothan politician, chairman of the Military Council (1986–1991).
- Joyce Lishman, 73, British social worker, bronchopneumonia.
- Gordon McVie, 76, British oncologist.
- Rabi Mishra, 64, Indian actor (Dhauli Express), cardiac arrest.
- Sibusiso Moyo, 60, Zimbabwean politician, minister of foreign affairs (since 2017), COVID-19.
- Unnikrishnan Namboothiri, 97, Indian actor (Kalyanaraman, Mayamohini, Photographer), complications from COVID-19.
- Ronnie Nasralla, 90, Jamaican record producer (Byron Lee and the Dragonaires).
- Lonnie Nielsen, 67, American golfer.
- Storrs L. Olson, 76, American paleontologist and ornithologist.
- Wayne Roberts, 76, Canadian food analyst and writer.
- Mike Sadek, 74, American baseball player (San Francisco Giants), heart and lung disease.
- Abdul Sahrin, 70, Filipino revolutionary (Moro National Liberation Front) and politician, member of the Bangsamoro Transition Authority Parliament (since 2019), brain tumor.
- Gajendra Singh Shaktawat, 47, Indian politician, Rajasthan MLA (2008–2013, since 2018), COVID-19.
- Eden Shand, 81, Trinidadian environmentalist and politician, MP (1987–1991).
- Bill Sheat, 90, New Zealand lawyer and arts advocate.
- Dominic J. Squatrito, 82, American jurist, judge of the U.S. District Court for Connecticut (since 1994).
- Peter Swan, 84, English footballer (Sheffield Wednesday, Matlock Town, national team).
- Ted Thompson, 68, American football player (Houston Oilers) and executive, general manager of Green Bay Packers, Super Bowl champion (1997, 2011), dysautonomia.
- Martha Jachi Umbulla, 65, Tanzanian politician, MNA (since 2005).
- Harold Widom, 88, American mathematician, complications from COVID-19.
- Ian Wilson, 81, English cinematographer (The Crying Game, Emma, Erik the Viking), COVID-19.
- Harthorne Wingo, 73, American basketball player (Allentown Jets, New York Knicks, Pallacanestro Cantù).
- Boris Zaborov, 85, Belarusian artist.

=== 21 ===
- Clarence Allen, 95, American geologist and seismologist.
- Calixto Avena, 77, Colombian footballer (Millonarios, Atlético Junior, national team), COVID-19.
- Bob Avian, 83, American choreographer and theatre producer (Dreamgirls, A Chorus Line, West Side Story), cardiac arrest.
- Evert Båge, 95, Swedish major general.
- Fred C. Bailey, 95, American engineer.
- Murray Balagus, 91, Canadian ice hockey player.
- Dave Bolton, 83, English rugby league player (Wigan, Balmain, Blackpool Borough).
- Donna Britt, 62, American news anchor (WAFB), complications from amyotrophic lateral sclerosis.
- Howard Carson, 63, American football player (Los Angeles Rams).
- Hank Coe, 74, American politician, member of the Wyoming Senate (1989–2021), cancer.
- Anthony Dawes, 92, British actor (The Avengers, Fawlty Towers, Z-Cars).
- Nathalie Delon, 79, French actress (When Eight Bells Toll, The Monk, Le Samouraï), cancer.
- Brian G. Gardiner, 88, British palaeontologist and zoologist.
- Jorunn Bjørg Giske, 93, Norwegian politician, deputy MP (1973–1977).
- Jean Graton, 97, French comic book writer and artist (Michel Vaillant).
- Kenneth Halverson, 87, American politician, member of the Pennsylvania House of Representatives (1967–1968, 1969–1980).
- George T. Heery, 93, American architect.
- Mauricio Herdocia Sacasa, 63, Nicaraguan jurist, general secretary of Central American Integration System (2000).
- Hasso Hofmann, 86, German philosopher.
- Rémy Julienne, 90, French stuntman (Licence to Kill, Fantômas, The Da Vinci Code), COVID-19.
- Jerry Kiernan, 67, Irish Olympic long-distance runner (1984).
- Roger LeClerc, 84, American football player (Chicago Bears, Denver Broncos).
- Abdul Majid Mandal, 72, Bangladeshi politician, MP (2014–2018).
- Jackson Mthembu, 62, South African politician, MP (since 2014) and minister in the Presidency (since 2019), complications from COVID-19.
- Cecilia Mangini, 93, Italian film director.
- Anthony Mwamba, 60, Zambian Olympic boxer (1988), COVID-19.
- Keith Nichols, 75, English jazz musician and arranger, COVID-19.
- Mick Norcross, 57, British businessman and television personality (The Only Way Is Essex).
- Solveig Nordström, 97, Swedish archeologist.
- José Pampuro, 71, Argentine politician, general secretary of the Presidency (2002–2003), minister of defense (2003–2005), and provisional president of the Senate (2006–2011).
- Randy Parton, 67, American country singer-songwriter, cancer.
- José Rivera Pérez, 73, Spanish bullfighter, cancer.
- Johnny Rogan, 67, English music journalist and biographer (Van Morrison: No Surrender).
- Phillip Russell, 88, American arbovirologist and general, cancer.
- Guy Shuttleworth, 94, English cricketer (Cambridge University).
- José Crisologo Sorra, 91, Filipino Roman Catholic prelate, bishop of Virac (1974–1993) and Legazpi (1993–2005).
- Dalma Špitzerová, 95, Slovak actress.
- Tony Waldron, British bioarchaeologist. (death announced on this date)
- Aleksey Zubov, 84, Russian jazz saxophonist and composer

=== 22 ===
- Hank Aaron, 86, American Hall of Fame baseball player (Milwaukee/Atlanta Braves, Milwaukee Brewers, Indianapolis Clowns) and civil rights activist.
- Edwin Ariyadasa, 98, Sri Lankan journalist.
- Jean-Pierre Baeumler, 72, French politician, deputy (1988–1993, 1997–2002).
- Jacqueline Berenstein-Wavre, 99, Swiss politician and feminist, member of the Grand Council of Geneva (1973–1989).
- José Manuel Botella Crespo, 71, Spanish politician, deputy (1986–1993) and member of the Corts Valencianes (1991–2003).
- Élisabeth Burdot, 81, Belgian journalist.
- Ron Campbell, 81, Australian animator (Yellow Submarine, The Flintstones, The New Adventures of Winnie the Pooh).
- Narendra Chanchal, 80, Indian singer.
- Aeneas Chigwedere, 81, Zimbabwean politician, minister of education (2001–2008) and governor of Mashonaland East (2008–2013), COVID-19.
- Henryk Chmielewski, 97, Polish comic book artist (Tytus, Romek i A'Tomek).
- Hughroy Currie, 61, Jamaican-born British boxer.
- Louis Dandrel, 82, French sound designer and musician.
- Clifton De Coteau, Trinidad and Tobago politician.
- Nick Drake-Lee, 78, English rugby union player (Leicester Tigers, national team).
- Ricardo Durão, 92, Portuguese Olympic modern pentathlete (1952).
- José Ángel García, 70, Mexican actor and television director (La rosa de Guadalupe), pulmonary fibrosis.
- Routouang Yoma Golom, Chadian militant and politician, MP (since 2011).
- Feliks Gromov, 83, Russian admiral, commander-in-chief of the Navy (1992–1997).
- Guem, 73, Algerian musician, composer and dancer.
- Juan Guzmán Tapia, 81, Chilean judge (Augusto Pinochet's arrest and trial).
- Jean Assaad Haddad, 94, Lebanese Melkite Greek Catholic hierarch, archeparch of Tyre (1988–2005).
- Marius van Heerden, 46, South African Olympic middle-distance runner (1996), COVID-19.
- Ibrahim Ishaq, 75, Sudanese writer.
- Tony Jones, 54, American football player (Denver Broncos, Cleveland Browns, Baltimore Ravens).
- Jorunn Kirkenær, 94, Norwegian ballet dancer.
- Steven T. Kuykendall, 73, American politician, member of the California State Assembly (1994–1998) and U.S. House of Representatives (1999–2001), pulmonary fibrosis.
- Janet Lawson, 80, American jazz singer.
- Gianfranco Lombardi, 79, Italian Hall of Fame basketball player (Virtus Bologna, national team) and coach (Scaligera Verona).
- Alfredo Magarotto, 93, Italian Roman Catholic prelate, bishop of Chioggia (1990–1997) and Vittorio Veneto (1997–2003).
- Meherzia Labidi Maïza, 57, Tunisian politician and translator, member of the Constituent Assembly (2011–2014) and deputy (since 2014).
- Joel Biggie Matiza, 60, Zimbabwean politician, minister of transport, communication and infrastructural development (since 2018), COVID-19.
- Forrest Moses, 86, American abstract painter.
- Sharon Kay Penman, 75, American historical novelist, pneumonia.
- Harry Perry, 86, Irish Olympic boxer (1956, 1960).
- Cyril Pinder, 74, American football player (Philadelphia Eagles, Chicago Bears, Dallas Cowboys).
- James Purify, 76, American soul singer (James & Bobby Purify), complications of COVID-19.
- Freddie Ryder, 78, British singer and guitarist.
- Abdul Aziz Said, 90, Syrian-American political scientist.
- Craige Schensted, 93, American physicist and mathematician.
- Martin Schneider, 82, German opera director.
- Alan Selman, 79, American mathematician and theoretical computer scientist.
- Luton Shelton, 35, Jamaican footballer (Harbour View, Vålerenga, national team), complications from amyotrophic lateral sclerosis.
- Raimo Suikkanen, 78, Finnish Olympic racing cyclist (1968, 1972).
- F. X. Sudjasmin, 77, Indonesian military officer, deputy chief of staff of the Army (1995–1997).
- Johnny Williams, 73, English footballer (Watford, Colchester United, Margate).
- Paradzai Zimondi, 73, Zimbabwean independence activist and military officer, COVID-19.

=== 23 ===
- Carlos Antunes, 82, Portuguese revolutionary and anti-fascist militant, COVID-19.
- RaNae Bair, 77, American Olympic javelin thrower (1964, 1968), cancer.
- Walter Bernstein, 101, American screenwriter (The Front, Miss Evers' Boys) and film director (Little Miss Marker), pneumonia.
- Emil Bildstein, 89, German Olympic water polo player (1952, 1956, 1960).
- Sylvanus Blackman, 87, Barbadian-British Olympic weightlifter (1960, 1964, 1968).
- Marty Brill, 88, American comedian and actor (The Pope of Greenwich Village).
- Andrew Brooks, 51, American medical researcher, heart attack.
- Mohamed Hédi Chérif, 88, Tunisian historian and academic.
- Charles Dyer, 92, English screenwriter (Rattle of a Simple Man, Staircase), playwright and actor.
- Dennis Ede, 89, British Anglican priest, archdeacon of Stoke (1989–1997).
- Tony Ferrer, 86, Filipino actor (The Vengeance of Fu Manchu, Chinatown: Sa Kuko ng Dragon, Manila Boy), heart disease.
- Paul Foytack, 90, American baseball player (Detroit Tigers, Los Angeles Angels).
- Abukari Gariba, 81, Ghanaian Olympic footballer (1968, 1972).
- Peter Gillott, 85, English footballer (Barnsley, Chelmsford City).
- Alberto Grimaldi, 95, Italian film producer (The Good, the Bad and the Ugly, Gangs of New York, Last Tango in Paris).
- Jonas Gwangwa, 83, South African jazz trombonist and film composer (Cry Freedom).
- Sir Peter Harper, 81, British geneticist.
- Hal Holbrook, 95, American actor (Mark Twain Tonight!, All the President's Men, Into the Wild), Emmy winner (1971, 1974, 1976, 1989).
- Larry King, 87, American Hall of Fame broadcaster (Larry King Live, Larry King Now, Politicking with Larry King), sepsis as a complication of COVID-19.
- Martha Madrigal, 92, Mexican poet, COVID-19.
- Lothar Metz, 82, German Olympic wrestler, gold (1968), silver (1960), and bronze medalist (1964).
- Geronimo Meynier, 79, Italian actor.
- Trisha Noble, 76, Australian singer and actress (Star Wars: Episode III – Revenge of the Sith, Strike Force), mesothelioma.
- John Oliver, 81, English Anglican priest, archdeacon of Leeds (1992–2005).
- Nilda Pedrosa, 46, American politician, acting under secretary of state for public diplomacy and public affairs (2020–2021), cancer.
- Omar Pirrera, 88, Italian poet, COVID-19.
- J. D. Power III, 89, American marketing executive, founder of J.D. Power.
- Margherita Roberti, 95, American operatic soprano.
- Robert Rowland, 54, British politician, MEP (2019–2020), drowned.
- Sumiko Sakamoto, 84, Japanese actress (The Pornographers, Warm Water Under a Red Bridge, The Ballad of Narayama) and singer, stroke.
- Anita R. Schiller, 94, American librarian, complications from COVID-19.
- Robert William Schrier, 84, American medical researcher.
- Song Yoo-jung, 26, South Korean actress (Golden Rainbow, Make Your Wish, School 2017).
- Tom Stevens, 64, American musician (The Long Ryders).
- Wayne Stevens, 84, American basketball player (Cincinnati Royals).
- Roy Torrens, 72, Irish cricket player and manager (national team), COVID-19.
- George Weatherill, 84, Australian politician, South Australia MLC (1986–2000).
- Pheoris West, 70, American artist.
- Gunawan Wirosaroyo, 74, Indonesian politician, MP (1999–2009).
- Joan Luedders Wolfe, 91, American environmentalist.

=== 24 ===
- George Armstrong, 90, Canadian Hall of Fame ice hockey player (Toronto Maple Leafs), Stanley Cup champion (1962–1964, 1967).
- Arik Brauer, 92, Austrian artist, co-founder of the Vienna School of Fantastic Realism.
- Jevrem Brković, 87, Montenegrin writer, poet, and historian.
- Roberto Cañas López, 70, Salvadoran politician, economist and academic, signatory of the Chapultepec Peace Accords.
- Nikolay Chebotko, 38, Kazakh Olympic cross country skier (2002, 2006, 2010, 2014), traffic collision.
- António Cardoso e Cunha, 87, Portuguese politician, European Commissioner (1986–1992).
- Lars Ditlev, 69, Danish-American football player (Philadelphia Eagles).
- Gilbert Duchateau, 73, Belgian Olympic sport shooter.
- Mohanna Durra, 83, Jordanian painter.
- Jóhannes Eðvaldsson, 70, Icelandic footballer (Celtic, Motherwell, national team).
- Sonny Fox, 95, American television host (Wonderama, Way Out Games), COVID-19.
- Phyllis Gilmore, 74, American politician.
- John F. Grundhofer, 82, American banker and executive, chairman of U.S. Bancorp (1990–1997, 1999–2002).
- Abdullahi Ibrahim, 82, Nigerian lawyer and politician, minister of justice (1997–1999), COVID-19.
- Jerry Johnson, 102, American basketball coach (LeMoyne–Owen Magicians).
- Michael Kawchuk, 89, Canadian politician.
- Bruce Kirby, 95, American actor (L.A. Law, Stand by Me, Crash).
- Franciszek Kokot, 91, Polish nephrologist and endocrinologist, rector of Medical Academy of Silesia (1982–1984), complications from COVID-19.
- Barry Le Va, 79, American sculptor and installation artist.
- Gunnel Lindblom, 89, Swedish actress (The Silence, Winter Light, The Virgin Spring).
- William Alwyn Lishman, 89, British psychiatrist and neurologist.
- Polly Lou Livingston, 91, American voice actress (Adventure Time).
- Sigvard Marjasin, 91, Swedish civil servant, president of the Swedish Municipal Workers' Union (1977–1988) and governor of Örebro County (1989–1994), COVID-19.
- Jeanette Maus, 39, American actress (Charm City Kings, Resident Evil Village, My Effortless Brilliance) and actress, colon cancer.
- Bobby McKee, 79, Northern Irish politician, mayor of Larne (2002–2004, 2011–2012).
- Jean-Pierre Michel, 82, French politician, deputy (1981–1986, 1988–2002) and senator (2004–2014).
- Barrie Mitchell, 73, Scottish footballer (Dunfermline Athletic, Aberdeen, Tranmere Rovers).
- Moshe Moskowitz, 96, Israeli politician, head of Shafir Regional Council (1952–1979).
- Bootsie Neal, 68, American politician, city commissioner of Dayton, Ohio (1991–2005).
- Don M. Newman, 97, American pharmacist, deputy secretary of health and human services (1985–1989).
- Patrick O'Donoghue, 86, Irish Roman Catholic prelate, bishop of Lancaster (2001–2009).
- Mike Omoighe, 62, Nigerian artist and educator, COVID-19.
- Urszula Plenkiewicz, 99, Polish scout and liaison officer.
- Ron Rafferty, 86, English footballer (Grimsby Town, Aldershot, Portsmouth).
- Carl Schalk, 91, American composer.
- Frank Shankwitz, 77, American philanthropist, co-founder of the Make-A-Wish Foundation, esophageal cancer.
- Joseph Sonnabend, 88, South African physician and HIV/AIDS researcher (How to Have Sex in an Epidemic), complications from a heart attack.
- Barbara Sullivan, 78, Canadian politician, Ontario MPP (1987–1995), cancer.
- Marcel Uderzo, 87, French comic book artist, COVID-19.
- Sifis Valirakis, 77, Greek politician and anti-junta activist, MP (1977–2004, 2009–2012) and minister of public order (1995–1996), drowned.
- David Washbrook, 72, British historian.
- Joe Yamauchi, 87, Canadian football player (BC Lions, Calgary Stampeders).
- Notable Brazilians killed in the Palmas FR plane crash:
  - Marcus Molinari, 23, footballer (Tupi, Ipatinga, Tupynambás).
  - Guilherme Noé, 28, footballer (Batatais, Rio Preto, Ipatinga).
  - Ranule, 27, footballer (Atlético Itapemirim, Democrata, Resende).

=== 25 ===
- John Ackroyd, 83, British engineer.
- Ihwan Datu Adam, 56, Indonesian politician, MP (2016–2019).
- Sōichi Aikawa, 78, Japanese politician, mayor of Urawa, Saitama (1991–2001) and Saitama (2001–2009), respiratory failure.
- Mike Bell, 63, American motorcycle racer, heart attack.
- Big Drama, 15, American racehorse, euthanized. (death announced on this date)
- Chico Borja, 61, Ecuadorian-American soccer player (New York Cosmos, Wichita Wings, U.S. national team) and manager, colon cancer.
- David Bright, 64, Botswanan football manager (Mogoditshane Fighters, Cape Town, national team), complications from COVID-19.
- Tseng Chang, 90, Chinese-American actor (Romeo Must Die, Agent Cody Banks, 2012).
- Jaoid Chiguer, 35, French Olympic boxer (2008), heart attack.
- Marie Harmon, 97, American actress (The El Paso Kid, Secret Beyond the Door, I Married a Woman).
- Iron, 29, South Korean rapper (Show Me the Money 3), blunt force trauma.
- Masada Iosefa, 32, Samoan rugby league player (Penrith Panthers, Wests Tigers, national team), traffic collision.
- David Katzenstein, 69, American virologist, COVID-19.
- Pierre Lherminier, 90, French cinematic historian and writer.
- Richard McCann, 71, American writer.
- Nicholas McNally, Zimbabwean judge. (death announced on this date)
- Avelino Méndez Rangel, 62, Mexican politician, deputy (2009–2012), COVID-19.
- C. R. Parthiban, 92, Indian actor (Veerapandiya Kattabomman).
- Jane Priestman, 90, British designer.
- Herman Puig, 92, Cuban photographer and painter.
- Jean Richard, 99, French historian.
- Ron Rodecker, 90, American educator, artist and television writer (Dragon Tales), heart failure.
- Dick Smith, 94, American baseball player (Pittsburgh Pirates).
- Vladimír Suchánek, 87, Czech artist.
- Maryan Synakowski, 84, French footballer (Sedan, Union SG, national team).
- Enrique Tábara, 90, Ecuadorian painter, heart attack.
- Dobrivoje Tošković, 93–94, Serbian architect, urban planner, and university professor.
- Mart Vilt, 85, Estonian middle-distance runner.
- Alistair Walker, 76, Canadian-born English racing driver.

=== 26 ===
- 6 Dogs, 21, American rapper, suicide by jumping.
- Georgi Ananiev, 70, Bulgarian politician, minister of defence (1997–1999), COVID-19.
- Alan Ashcroft, 90, English rugby union player (Waterloo, British & Irish Lions, national team).
- Harry Beal, 90, American soldier, first Navy SEAL.
- Winfried Bölke, 79, German racing cyclist.
- Stephen Carter, 77, American politician, member of the Louisiana House of Representatives (2008–2020), COVID-19.
- Kjersti Døvigen, 77, Norwegian actress (The Last Fleksnes, Lasse & Geir, Life and Death).
- Yabing Masalon Dulo, 106, Filipino textile weaver and dyer.
- Berit Oskal Eira, 69, Norwegian politician, Sámi MP (since 2001).
- Fred Forsberg, 76, American football player (Denver Broncos, Buffalo Bills).
- Virginia Fraser, 73, Australian artist.
- Ken Frost, 82, American football player (Dallas Cowboys).
- Margitta Gummel, 79, German shot putter, Olympic champion (1968).
- James Gita Hakim, 66, South Sudanese–Ugandan cardiologist, COVID-19.
- Richard Holzer, 97, Austrian-born Panamanian architect.
- Val Howell, Welsh lawn bowler.
- Nurul Huq, 85, Bangladeshi naval officer, chief of Naval Staff (1972–1973), complications from diabetes.
- Constance Isherwood, 101, Canadian lawyer.
- Ron Johnson, 64, American baseball player (Kansas City Royals, Montreal Expos) and manager (Norfolk Tides), COVID-19.
- Billy Kenoi, 52, American politician, mayor of Hawaii County (2008–2016), myelofibrosis.
- Jack L. Koenig, 87, American chemical engineer.
- Norman Krivosha, 86, American lawyer and jurist, chief justice of the Nebraska Supreme Court (1978–1987).
- María Teresa Linares Savio, 100, Cuban musicologist and ethnographer.
- Richard Machek, 83, American politician, member of the Florida House of Representatives (2000–2008).
- Hana Maciuchová, 75, Czech actress (Holiday for a Dog, In the Coat of Lioness' Arms, Loners).
- Luc Julian Matthys, 85, Belgian-born Australian Roman Catholic prelate, bishop of Armidale (1999–2011).
- Bob McCallister, 86, American golfer, PGA Tour champion (1961, 1964).
- George T. McDonald, 76, American philanthropist and social worker.
- Gene McDowell, 81, American football player (Florida State Seminoles) and coach (UCF Knights), leukemia.
- Stephan P. Mickle, 76, American jurist, judge (since 1998) and chief judge (2009–2011) of the U.S. District Court for Northern Florida.
- John Mortimore, 86, English football player (Chelsea) and manager (Benfica, Belenenses).
- John Morton, 95, English trade unionist and musician, general secretary of the Musicians' Union (1971–1990) and president of the International Federation of Musicians (1973–2004).
- Cindy Nemser, 83, American art historian.
- Lars Norén, 76, Swedish playwright, novelist and poet, COVID-19.
- Abdulkadir Orire, 87, Nigerian Islamic legal scholar.
- Cara O'Sullivan, 59, Irish coloratura soprano singer.
- Sergei Prikhodko, 64, Russian politician, deputy prime minister (2013–2018), complications from amyotrophic lateral sclerosis.
- Sekou Smith, 48, American sportswriter and journalist (The Indianapolis Star, The Atlanta Journal-Constitution, NBA TV), COVID-19.
- Margaret C. Snyder, 91, American social scientist and feminist, founder of the United Nations Development Fund for Women, cardiac arrest.
- Ann Suzuki, 85, Canadian textile artist.
- Ben Te Haara, 88, New Zealand Anglican prelate, bishop of Te Pīhopatanga o Te Tai Tokerau (1992–2001).
- Peter Thorburn, 81, New Zealand rugby union player (Auckland) and coach (North Harbour, U.S. national team).
- Carlos Holmes Trujillo, 69, Colombian politician and diplomat, minister of the interior (1997–1998), foreign affairs (2018–2019) and defense (since 2019), COVID-19.
- Jozef Vengloš, 84, Slovak football player (Slovan Bratislava) and manager (Celtic, Czechoslovakia national team).
- Peter Vere-Jones, 81, British-born New Zealand actor (The Hobbit: The Desolation of Smaug, Shortland Street, Xena: Warrior Princess).
- Osamu Yamaji, 91, Japanese footballer.

=== 27 ===
- Flavio Alfaro, 59, American baseball player, Olympic silver medalist (1984), pancreatic cancer.
- Sidney Alford, 86, British explosives engineer and inventor, heart failure.
- Bertulfo Álvarez, 69–70, Colombian guerrilla fighter (Caribbean Bloc of the FARC-EP).
- Ansif Ashraf, 37, Indian magazine editor (Cochin Herald), COVID-19.
- Gert Blomé, 86, Swedish ice hockey player, Olympic silver medallist (1964).
- Blas Camacho, 81, Spanish lawyer and politician, deputy (1977–1982, 1986–1993), COVID-19.
- Yvonne Conolly, 81, Jamaican-born British educator, myeloma.
- José Cruz, 68, Honduran footballer (Motagua, Real España, national team), COVID-19.
- Anne Daubenspeck-Focke, 98, German sculptor and painter.
- Héctor Fix-Zamudio, 96, Mexican jurist, judge of the Inter-American Court of Human Rights (1987–1997).
- Freddy, 8, English Great Dane, world's tallest dog.
- Dick Gallup, 79, American poet.
- Guy Emmanuel Alain Gauze, 68, Ivorian politician and diplomat, ambassador to the European Union (2000–2002).
- Goddess Bunny, 61, American drag queen and actress (Hollywood Vice Squad, The Goddess Bunny, Rage), COVID-19.
- Godfrey Hodgson, 86, British journalist and historian.
- Margareta Jacobsson, 91, Swedish Olympic alpine skier (1952).
- Jeh V. Johnson, 89, American architect.
- Helga Klein, 89, German Olympic sprinter (1952).
- Cloris Leachman, 94, American Hall of Fame actress (The Mary Tyler Moore Show, The Last Picture Show, Young Frankenstein), Oscar winner (1971), stroke and COVID-19.
- Corky Lee, 73, American photojournalist, complications from COVID-19.
- Saini Lemamea, 56, Samoan rugby union player (national team). (death announced on this date)
- Michael McGrath, 78, American politician, Minnesota state treasurer (1987–1999).
- Wendel Meldrum, 66, Canadian actress (The Wonder Years, Less Than Kind, Seinfeld).
- Mehrdad Minavand, 45, Iranian football player (Pas, Persepolis, national team) and manager, COVID-19.
- Phillida Nicholson, 96, British artist. (death announced on this date)
- Tim Owhefere, 57, Nigerian politician, Delta State MHA (since 2007).
- Jerome Pearson, 82, American engineer and space scientist.
- Aminuddin Ponulele, 81, Indonesian academician and politician, governor of Central Sulawesi (2001–2006).
- Antoni Puigdellívol, 74, Andorran politician, mayor of Andorra la Vella (1978–1979), MP (1982–1985), and minister of tourism and environment (2005–2007).
- Tiina Rinne, 91, Finnish actress (Kotikatu).
- Efraín Ruales, 36, Ecuadorian actor, musician, and TV presenter, shot.
- Trung Kiên, 81, Vietnamese classical singer.
- Carmen Vázquez, 72, American LGBT activist and writer, complications from COVID-19.

=== 28 ===
- Wismoyo Arismunandar, 80, Indonesian military officer, chief of staff of the Army (1993–1995).
- Chedly Ayari, 87, Tunisian economist and politician, minister of education (1970–1971) and finance (1972–1974), president of the Central Bank (2012–2018), COVID-19.
- Mangal Bagh, 47–48, Pakistani militant, leader of Lashkar-e-Islam (since 2006), mine explosion.
- Lida Barrett, 93, American mathematician.
- John L. Behan, 76, American politician, member of the New York State Assembly (1979–1995).
- Rod Boll, 68, Canadian Olympic sports shooter (1996).
- Ron Botchan, 85, American football player (Los Angeles Chargers, Houston Oilers) and umpire (National Football League).
- Leslie Brown, 84, English footballer (Dulwich Hamlet).
- Adrián Campos, 60, Spanish racing driver (Formula One) and team owner (Campos Racing).
- Miguel Celdrán, 80, Spanish politician, senator (2000, 2004–2007) and mayor of Badajoz (1995–2013).
- Eddie Connachan, 85, Scottish footballer (Dunfermline Athletic, Middlesbrough, national team).
- Paul J. Crutzen, 87, Dutch atmospheric chemist, Nobel laureate (1995).
- Cédric Demangeot, 46, French poet.
- Yvon Douis, 85, French footballer (Lille, AS Monaco, national team), COVID-19.
- Jean Dubois, 94, Belgian Olympic field hockey player (1948, 1952, 1956, 1960).
- Guillermo Galeote, 79, Spanish doctor and politician, deputy (1977–1993), COVID-19.
- Kathleen Ann Goonan, 68, American science fiction author, bone cancer.
- John Grant, 89, Scottish footballer (Hibernian, national team).
- Morton Ira Greenberg, 87, American jurist, judge of the U.S. Court of Appeals for the Third Circuit (since 1987).
- Shaibal Gupta, 67, Indian social scientist, multiple organ failure.
- Rafael Heredia, 84, Mexican Olympic basketball player (1964, 1968).
- Bjarne Holen, 95, Norwegian politician, deputy MP (1965–1973).
- Gil Imaná, 87, Bolivian muralist and painter.
- César Isella, 82, Argentine singer-songwriter (Los Fronterizos), coronary disease.
- Abu Yasser al-Issawi, 43, Iraqi Islamic militant (Islamic State), military strike.
- Dominic Jeeva, 93, Sri Lankan author.
- Mangalamkunnu Karnan, 60–63, Indian elephant, cardiac arrest.
- Ryszard Kotys, 88, Polish actor (Operacja Himmler, Shivers, Świat według Kiepskich), COVID-19.
- Sibongile Khumalo, 63, South African singer.
- Annette Kullenberg, 82, Swedish journalist (Aftonbladet) and author, COVID-19.
- Vasily Lanovoy, 87, Russian actor (Colleagues, Going Inside a Storm, Officers), People's Artist of the USSR (1985), complications of COVID-19.
- Christopher Lewis, 76, American filmmaker (Blood Cult), heart disease.
- Juan del Río Martín, 73, Spanish Roman Catholic prelate, military archbishop of Spain (since 2008) and bishop of Asidonia-Jerez (2000–2008), COVID-19.
- Alberto Matos, 76, Portuguese Olympic sprinter (1972).
- Kenneth Mthiyane, 76, South African jurist, deputy president of the Supreme Court of Appeal (2012–2014), COVID-19.
- Rafael Navarro-Gonzalez, 61, Mexican astrobiologist, COVID-19.
- Walter Plywaski, 91, Polish-born American Holocaust survivor and lecturer, complications from COVID-19.
- Alice Recoque, 91, French computer scientist.
- Sherman Robertson, 72, American blues musician.
- Krishan Dev Sethi, 93, Indian politician and independence activist, member of the Constituent Assembly of Jammu and Kashmir (1951–1957).
- Singing Sandra, 64, Trinidadian calypso singer.
- Bachir Skiredj, 81, Moroccan actor (In Search of My Wife's Husband), COVID-19.
- Aidan Sprot, 102, British army officer.
- Cicely Tyson, 96, American Hall of Fame actress (Sounder, The Autobiography of Miss Jane Pittman, The Trip to Bountiful), Tony winner (2013).
- Wang Shouguan, 98, Chinese astronomer, delegate to the National People's Congress (1978–1998) and member of the Chinese Academy of Sciences.
- Jeffrey Watson, 81, British priest, archdeacon of Ely (1993–2004).
- Heidi Weisel, 59, American fashion designer.
- Lewis Wolpert, 91, South African-born British developmental biologist, COVID-19.
- Valerie Yule, 92, Australian child psychologist.

=== 29 ===
- Ahmed Achour, 75, Tunisian composer and conductor.
- Emilia Asim-Ita, 33, Nigerian entrepreneur, co-founder of The Future Awards Africa.
- Beatriz Barba, 92, Mexican archaeologist, member of the Mexican Academy of Sciences.
- Bunki Bankaitis-Davis, 63, American Olympic cyclist (1988), world champion (1992), cancer.
- Walker Boone, 76, Canadian actor (The Adventures of Super Mario Bros. 3, Super Mario World).
- Dick Callahan, 80, American public address announcer (Oakland Athletics, Golden State Warriors, California Golden Bears football).
- John Chaney, 89, American Hall of Fame basketball coach (Cheyney State Wolves, Temple Owls).
- Cy Chermak, 91, American television producer (CHiPs, Ironside, Kolchak: The Night Stalker).
- Michael Clanchy, 84, British medieval historian, stroke.
- Calane da Silva, 75, Mozambican writer and journalist, COVID-19.
- Christian Daigle, 42, Canadian ice hockey agent.
- Art Davis, 86, American football player (Pittsburgh Steelers), Parkinson's disease.
- Donald J. Delandro, 85, American brigadier general.
- Richard L. Feigen, 90, American art gallery owner, complications from COVID-19.
- Roberto Frojuello, 83, Brazilian footballer (São Paulo, River Plate, Colo-Colo).
- Grady Gaines, 86, American blues saxophonist.
- Robert Heuberger, 99, Swiss businessman.
- Flory Jagoda, 97, Bosnian-born American musician and songwriter.
- Dante Jimenez, 68, Filipino educator and victims' rights campaigner, chairman of the Presidential Anti-Corruption Commission (since 2018), aortic aneurysm.
- Arvind Joshi, 84, Indian actor (Sholay, Love Marriage, Ab To Aaja Saajan Mere).
- José Júlio, 85, Portuguese bullfighter, COVID-19.
- Maurice Kleman, 86, French physicist.
- Otto Dov Kulka, 88, Israeli historian.
- John E. Kutzbach, 83, American climate scientist.
- Lai Xiaomin, 58, Chinese economist and convicted embezzler, chairman of China Huarong Asset Management (2012–2018), execution.
- Jeremy Lubbock, 89, English pianist and Grammy-winning arranger ("Hard Habit to Break", "When I Fall in Love").
- Mary Anne Marchino, 83, American Olympic swimmer (1956).
- Alberto Neuman, 87, Argentine classical pianist.
- Reinaldo Paniagua Diez, 86, Puerto Rican politician, secretary of state (1977–1979) and senator (1985–1989).
- Didier Pasgrimaud, 54, French Olympic cyclist (1988).
- Joe Pat Prunty, 88, Northern Irish Gaelic footballer (Roslea Shamrocks).
- Merritt Ruhlen, 76, American linguist.
- Rolf Siemssen, 87, Dutch-German nuclear physicist.
- Steve Stephens, 90, American personal relations practitioner and presenter.
- Tochinoumi Teruyoshi, 82, Japanese sumo wrestler, aspiration pneumonia.
- Jacqueline Thévoz, 94, Swiss writer, poet and journalist.
- Percy Tucker, 92, South African author and ticket selling agent, COVID-19.
- Varol Ürkmez, 84, Turkish footballer (Beşiktaş, Altay, national team).
- Hilton Valentine, 77, English Hall of Fame guitarist (The Animals).

=== 30 ===
- Jay Blumler, 96, American-British theorist of communication and media.
- Allan Burns, 85, American television producer and screenwriter (The Munsters, The Mary Tyler Moore Show, Rhoda), Emmy winner (1968, 1971, 1977).
- Helene S. Coleman, 95, American religious activist, president of the National Council of Jewish Women.
- Chad Colley, 76, American para-alpine skier, army officer, and disability advocate, Paralympic champion (1992).
- József Csatári, 77, Hungarian wrestler, Olympic bronze medalist (1968, 1972).
- Nisa Donnelly, 70, American novelist.
- Double K, 43, American rapper (People Under the Stairs).
- Rafael Gallardo García, 93, Mexican Roman Catholic prelate, bishop of Linares (1974–1987) and Tampico (1987–2003).
- Bill Hammond, 74, New Zealand artist.
- Bernice Falk Haydu, 100, American aviator.
- Mick Kerr, 86, Northern Irish Gaelic footballer (Tyrone).
- Abbas Khan, 66, Pakistani squash player, complications from COVID-19.
- Wilhelm Knabe, 97, German ecologist and politician, MP (1987–1990), COVID-19.
- Rosalyn Koo, 94, Chinese-born American businesswoman and philanthropist.
- Michel Le Bris, 76, French writer.
- Alfreda Markowska, 94, Polish Holocaust survivor and philanthropist.
- Eugenio Martínez, 98, Cuban-born American operative (CIA, Brigade 2506) and convicted criminal (Watergate burglary).
- Edward Stourton, 27th Baron Mowbray, 67, English peer, fall.
- Neelo, 80, Pakistani actress (Bhowani Junction, Do Raste, Ghunghat).
- Pantelei Sandulache, 64, Moldovan politician, MP (1990–1994).
- Turki bin Nasser Al Saud, 72, Saudi prince and military officer.
- Sophie, 34, Scottish singer-songwriter ("Bipp", "Lemonade") and record producer, accidental fall.
- Robert Stevens, 87, British lawyer and academic.
- Nelly Toll, 88, Polish-born American artist, writer, and Holocaust survivor, cardiac arrhythmia and pulmonary embolism.
- Michel Trempont, 92, Belgian opera singer.
- Marc Wilmore, 57, American comedian and screenwriter (In Living Color, The Simpsons, F Is for Family), Emmy winner (2008), COVID-19.
- Alla Yoshpe, 83, Russian pop singer, People's Artist of the Russian Federation (2002).

=== 31 ===
- Zoila Águila Almeida, 82, Cuban revolutionary combatant, COVID-19.
- Mark Beard, 72, American racing driver and team owner (Beard Motorsports).
- Douglas Bravo, 88, Venezuelan guerrilla fighter (FALN), COVID-19.
- Philip Favel, 98, Canadian indigenous activist.
- Peter T. Fay, 92, American jurist, judge of the S.D. Fla. (1970–1976) and judge of the U.S. Courts of Appeals for the Fifth (1976–1981) and Eleventh (since 1981) Circuits.
- Benedict J. Fernandez, 84, American educator and photojournalist.
- Terrence L. Fine, 81, American scientist and philosopher.
- John Gibbons, 95, English footballer (QPR, Ipswich Town, Tottenham Hotspur), COVID-19.
- Alejandro Gómez, 53, Spanish Olympic long-distance runner (1996), brain tumor.
- Nate Hawkins, 70, American football player (Houston Oilers), COVID-19.
- Andrej Hryc, 71, Slovak actor (Rivers of Babylon, Habermann, Colette), leukemia.
- Ilahi Jamadar, 74, Indian Marathi ghazal poet.
- Andrzej Kossakowski, 82, Polish theoretical physicist.
- Abdul Hamid Mahmud, 79, Indonesian military officer and politician, regent of Malang (1985–1995) and vice-governor of East Java (1995–2000).
- Tozama Mantashe, 60, South African politician, MP (since 2014), complications from COVID-19.
- Bill McKenny, 80, American football player (Georgia Bulldogs, Edmonton Eskimos).
- Lothar Meister, 90, German racing cyclist.
- Wambali Mkandawire, 68, Malawian jazz singer, COVID-19.
- Michel Murr, 88, Lebanese construction executive and politician, MP (1968–1972, since 1992), minister of national defense (1990–1992) and interior (1994–2000), COVID-19.
- Elizabeth Muyovwe, 64, Zambian jurist, judge of the Supreme Court (since 2010), COVID-19.
- Michael O'Keefe, 89, American politician, member (1960–1983) and president (1976–1983) of the Louisiana State Senate, cancer.
- Mihail Popescu, 60, Romanian Olympic ice hockey player (1980).
- David Rose, 89, Scottish rugby union (Jed-Forest RFC, national team) and rugby league (Leeds) player.
- Martial Rose, 98, English educator and historian.
- Herman Prins Salomon, 91, Dutch translator and academic.
- Pierre-Paul Savoie, 66, Canadian choreographer and dancer, cancer.
- Yitzchok Scheiner, 98, American-born Israeli Haredi rabbi, COVID-19.
- Meshulam Dovid Soloveitchik, 99, Polish-born Israeli Haredi rabbi, rosh yeshiva of the Brisk yeshiva (since 1959), complications from COVID-19.
- John M. Squire, 75, British biophysicist, COVID-19.
- Ladislav Štaidl, 75, Czech composer and musician, Medal of Merit recipient, complications from COVID-19.
- Justo Tejada, 88, Spanish footballer (Barcelona, Real Madrid, national team).
- Miroslav Tuđman, 74, Croatian scientist and politician, MP (since 2011), COVID-19.
- Abraham J. Twerski, 90, American-born Israeli Hasidic rabbi and psychiatrist, COVID-19.
- Heidi Vanderbilt, 72, American actress.
- Oliver Welden, 74, Chilean poet.
- Eric Wetherell, 95, British conductor, composer and musical author.
- Victor Ziga, 75, Filipino politician, senator (1987–1992), multiple organ failure.
