= José Manuel Botella Crespo =

Spanish politician (1949–2021)

José Manuel Botella Crespo (1949 – 22 January 2021) was a Spanish politician who served as a Deputy and as a member of Corts Valencianes.
