= Keliek Wicaksono =

Indonesian visual effects artist (1978–2021)

Keliek Wicaksono (7 July 1978 – 5 January 2021) was an Indonesian visual effects artist.

Keliek won the 2018 Citra Cup and 2018 Maya Cup for the film 212 Warrior. Keliek died at the MRCCC Siloam Hospital in Jakarta due to blood cancer.

== Filmography ==
Year	Film	Role
2018	212 Warrior	Visual effects
2018	Terlalu Tampan	Visual effects
2018	Petualangan Menangkap Petir	Visual effects
2019	Abracadabra	Visual effects
2019	Nanti Kita Cerita Tentang Hari Ini	Visual effects
2019	Eggnoid: Cinta & Portal Waktu	Visual effects
2019	Mantan Manten	Visual effects
2020	Serigala Langit	Visual effects

Source : Keliek Wicaksono

== Awards and nominations ==
Year	Type	Award	Result
2018	Maya Cup	Best Visual Effects Artist (212 Warrior)	Won
2018	Indonesian Film Festival (Citra Cup)	Best Visual Effects Artist (212 Warrior)	Won
2020	Indonesian Film Festival (Citra Cup)	Best Visual Effects Artist (Abracadabra)	Nominated

Source : Keliek Wicaksono
