= João Henrique de Souza =

Brazilian politician (1943–2021)

Member of the Legislative Assembly of Paraíba
- In office 1 February 2007 – 12 January 2021

Personal details
- Born: 8 January 1943; Monteiro, Third Brazilian Republic
- Died: 12 January 2021 (aged 78); São Paulo, Brazil
- Political party: Brazilian Social Democracy Party

João Henrique de Souza (8 January 1943 – 12 January 2021) was a Brazilian politician, judge, and chief of police. He was a member of the Legislative Assembly of Paraíba from 1 February 2007 until his death.

== Biography ==
Born in Monteiro, Souza was graduated in Law. He served as a delegate for the Civil Police of Paraíba State in João Pessoa and an electoral judge at the Regional Electoral Court of Paraíba.

Souza was elected a member of the Legislative Assembly of Paraíba for the first time in the 2006 elections, initially by the Liberal Front Party, and re-elected in the 2010 and 2014 elections by the Democrats. Unsatisfied with this party, he left for the Brazilian Social Democracy Party in 2017. He was re-elected by that party in 2018, with 34,813 votes.

Souza died from COVID-19 at Vila Nova Star Hospital, in São Paulo, on 12 January 2021, aged 78.
