= Robert L. Lennon =

American politician (1933–2021)

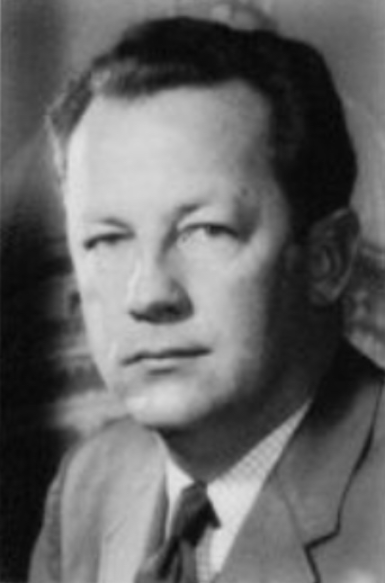

Member of the Mississippi House of Representatives
- In office 1968–1972

Personal details
- Born: March 13, 1933
- Died: January 10, 2021 (aged 87) Washington, D.C.
- Education: University of Mississippi; University of Southern Mississippi

Robert L. Lennon (March 13, 1933 – January 10, 2021) was an American politician. He served as a member of the Mississippi House of Representatives.

== Life and career ==
Lennon attended the University of Mississippi and the University of Southern Mississippi.

Lennon served in the Mississippi House of Representatives from 1968 to 1972.

Lennon died in January 2021 in Washington, D.C., at the age of 87.
