= Habibullah Abdurazzaq =

Tajik actor and director (1937–2021)

- Ҳабибуллоҳ Абдураззоқ حبیب الله عبدالرزاق
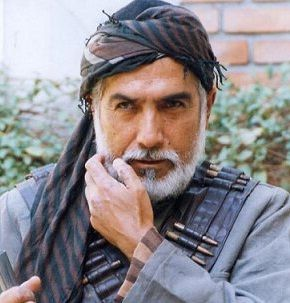
- Born: November 7, 1937; Kulob, Tajik SSR, Soviet Union
- Died: January 19, 2021 (aged 83); Dushanbe, Tajikistan
- Occupation: Actor
- Years active: 1962–1988
- Awards: People's Artist of the Tajik SSR

Khabibullo Abdurazzakov (Tajik: Ҳабибулло Абдураззоқов; 7 November 1937 – 19 January 2021) was a Tajik actor and director of theater and cinema. He was a made a member of the Union of Cinematographers of the USSR in 1973.
