= Seth Abid Hussain =

Pakistani smuggler(1933–2021)

- Born: 1933; Kasur, Pakistan
- Died: 8 January 2021 (aged 88)
- Other name: The King of Gold
- Occupation: Businessman

Seth Abid Hussain (1933 – 8 January 2021) was a Pakistani gold merchant, billionaire, and smuggler. He gained prominence in Pakistan's business community and was known for his involvement in smuggling and the gold trade, earning him the nickname "The King of Gold" in the country.

Hussain's net worth in 2017 was estimated to be around 3 billion USD. Besides being one of Pakistan's richest men, with businesses operating out of Lahore and Karachi, he also ran prominent charity projects. The various philanthropic activities of Hussain, against the backdrop of his children being deaf, included the founding of the Hamza Foundation Academy for the Deaf in Lahore.
