= Evžen Neustupný =

Czech archaeologist (1933–2021)

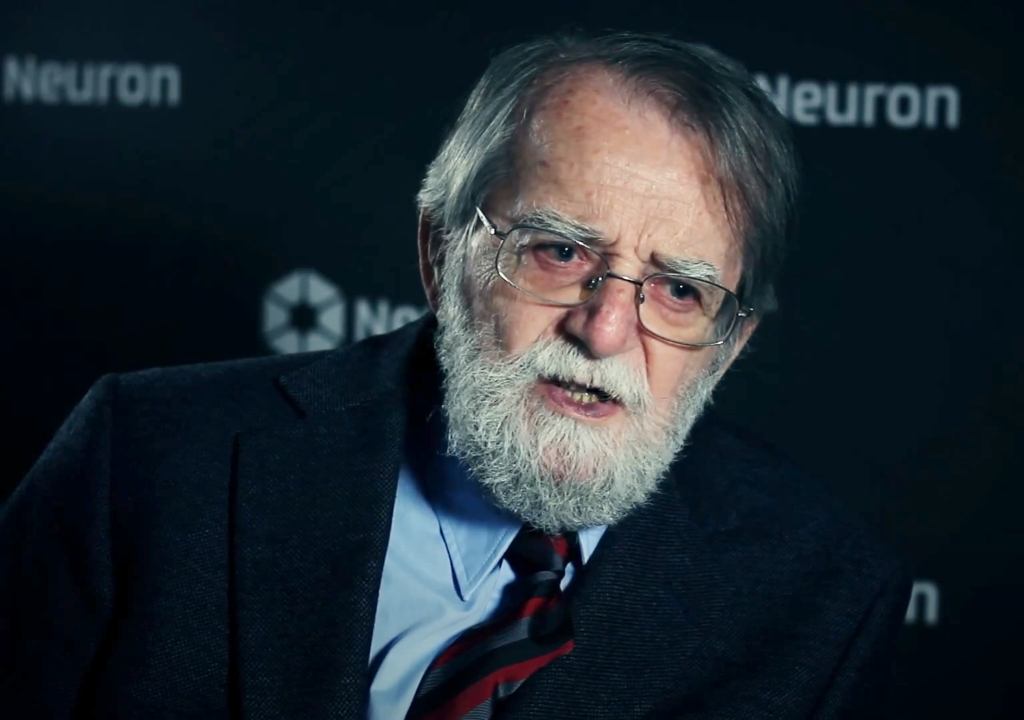
Evžen Neustupný

Evžen Neustupný (31 October 1933 – 14 January 2021) was a Czech archaeologist, born in Prague and educated at the Charles University. He was a son of the archaeologist and museologist Jiří Neustupný.

He was an author of numerous publications, e.g. Archaeological Method.

On 14 January 2021, Neustupný died at the age of 87.
