= Christian Massé =

French writer (1951–2021)

- Born: 27 August 1951; Parthenay, France
- Died: 1 January 2021 (aged 69); Tours, France
- Occupation: Writer

Christian Massé (27 August 1951 – 1 January 2021) was a French writer. He sometimes wrote under the pseudonym Julien Viaud and published in the journals Plaisir d'écrire of Perpignan and Le Jardin d'Essai of Paris.

== Publications ==
- Être noir à Jean-Jaurès (1997)
- Le drôle-au-diable (2001)
- La mesure du temps : anthologie (2004)
- La Loire dans tous ses ébats ou Une déambulation autour de la crue de Bréhémont en 1856 : nouvelle ligérienne (2007)
- La dernière nuit de Josepha Saint-Amand (2009)
- La colère des imbéciles remplit le monde ! : opuscule (2013)
- Et « Siroco » nous était conté ? (2013)

=== Under the Pseudonym Julien Viaud ===
- Les Genêts (1986)
- Les rocs et les cendres (1995)
