= Holiday for a Dog =

1980 film by Jaroslava Vosmiková

Holiday for a Dog (Czech: Prázdniny pro psa) is a Czech comedy film. It was released in 1980.
