= Josep Fornas =

Spanish politician (1924–2021)

Josep Fornas Martínez (19 October 1924 – 4 January 2021) was a Spanish politician who served in the Parliament of Catalonia.
