= Cédric Demangeot =

French poet (1974–2021)

- Born: 3 November 1974
- Died: 28 January 2021 (aged 46)
- Occupation: Poet

Cédric Demangeot (3 November 1974 – 28 January 2021) was a French poet. He was the founder of the journals Moriturus and Fissile.

== Poetry ==
- Autrement contredit (1998)
- & cargaisons (2004)
- Obstaculaire (2004)
- Malusine (2006)
- Ravachol (2007)
- Eléplégie (2007)
- & ferrailleurs (2008)
- Philoctète (2008)
- Érosions (2009)
- Sale temps (2011)
- Une inquiétude (2013)
- Psilocybe (2013)
- Un enfer (2017)
- Pour personne (2019)
- Le Poudroiement des conclusions (2020)
- Promenade et guerre (2021)

== Theatre ==
- Salomé (2019)

== Other texts ==
- Preface of Monsieur Morphée empoisonneur public (1998)
- Poésie noire poésie blanche (1999)
- Descente dans la langue-mort des Mères (2000)
- Le veau vomit le poète (2000)
- Pour personne (2001)
- Roger Gilbert-Lecomte (2001)
- Stanislas Rodanski ou le prisme noir (2002)
- À nous rien, de dire… (2007)
- Traversées... sur les traces de Claude Tarnaud (2011)
- Page un (2012)
- Petit horoscope illustré (2012)
- Le petit livre du bonheur (2013)
- Ceci je l'ai trouvé dans le fumier... (2013)
- Éléments de sabotage passif (2017)
- Erratum (2019)

== Translations ==
- Les démons de la langue (1999)
- Le nu de la fin du jour (2000)
- Corps effleuré de l'aimée (2001)
- Fleur de cendre (2002)
- Neuf sonnets (2004)
- Larry se pend (2009)
- Bonne nouvelle du désastre et autres poèmes (2013)
- Aux chênes de Glencree (2014)
- Alcools (2014)
- Conjurations contre la vie (2016)
- J'avais du temps vorace l'inquiétude (2016)
- Casse-tête (2016)
- Une cour en hiver (2016)
- Des choses détruites (2017)
- Poèmes de l'asile de Mondragón (2017)
- Peter Punk (2017)
- Le dernier homme (2020)
- Le mur des souvenirs (2020)
- Tanière d’un animal qui n’existe pas (poésie 1998-2000) (2020)
- Le sang de la bourse (2020)
