= Marion Colthorpe =

British Elizabethan scholar (died 2021)

Marion Evelyn Colthorpe FSA (1933/4 – 20 January 2021) was a British historian and Elizabethan scholar.

== Biography ==
Colthorpe studied English at St Hugh's College, Oxford and subsequently trained as a barrister, being called to the Bar at Lincoln's Inn. She spent a great deal of time researching her life's work 'The Elizabethan Court Day by Day', published online by the Folger Institute.

She was elected as a Fellow of the Society of Antiquaries of London on 10 October 2018.

== Select publications ==
- Colthorpe, M. E. 2017. The Elizabethan Court Day by Day, Folger.
- Colthorpe, M. 1989. "Queen Elizabeth I and Norwich Cathedral", Norfolk Archaeology 40(3). doi:10.5284/1078249
- Colthorpe, M. 1987. "The Theobalds entertainment for Queen Elizabeth I in 1591, with a transcript of the Gardener's Speech", Records of Early English Drama 12(1), pp. 2–9.
- Colthorpe, M. 1986. "A 'prorogued' Elizabethan tournament", Records of Early English Drama 11(2), pp. 3–9.
- Colthorpe, M. 1984. "Edmund Campion’s Alleged Interview with Queen Elizabeth I in 1581", British Catholic History 17(2), pp. 197–200. doi:10.1017/S0034193200001047
- Colthorpe, M. and Bateman, L. 1977. Queen Elizabeth I and Harlow.
