= Arsenio Lope Huerta =

Spanish writer and politician (1943–2021)

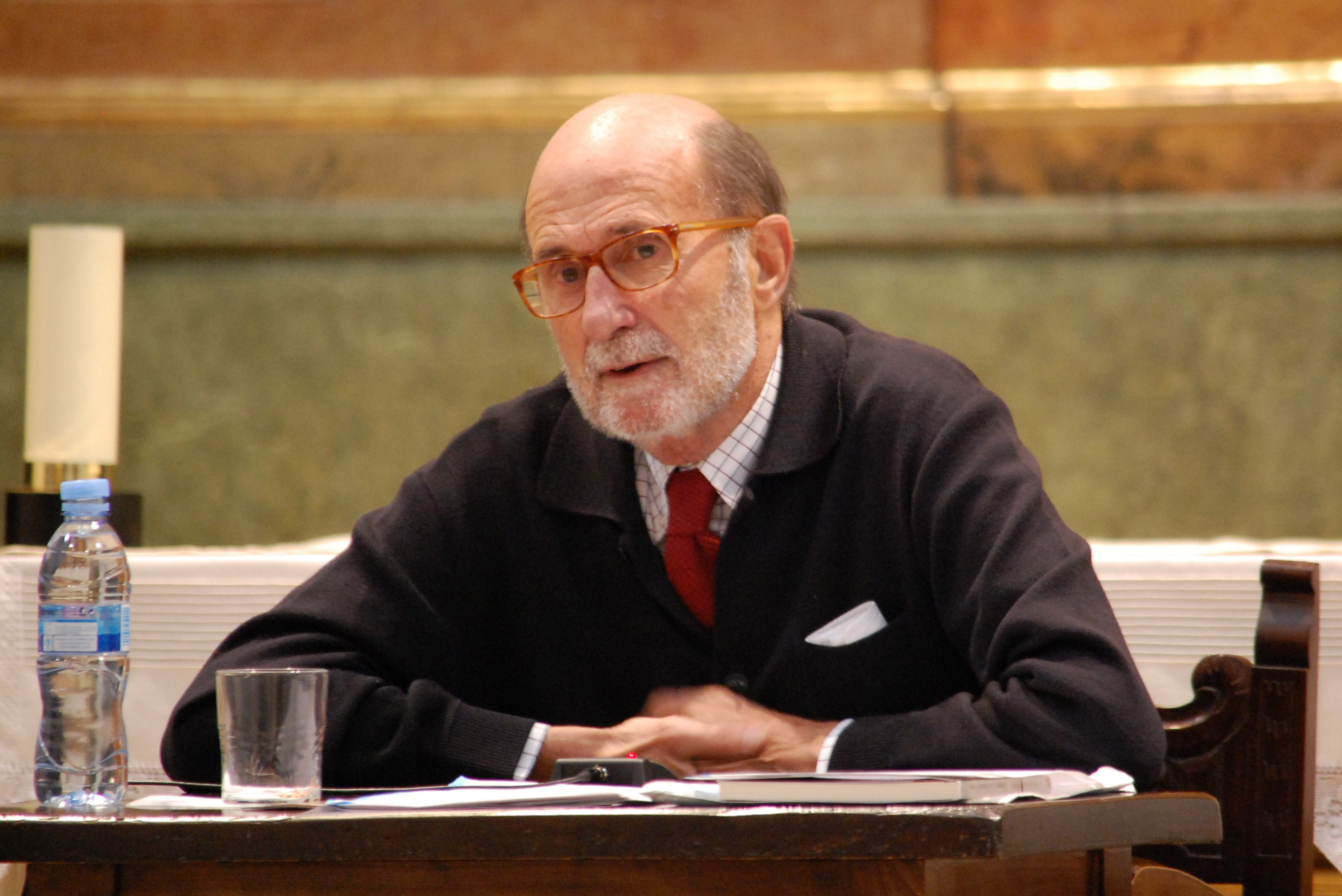
- Huerta in 2017

Mayor of Alcalá de Henares
- In office 23 May 1983 – 25 February 1987
- Preceded by: Carlos Valenzuela Lillo
- Succeeded by: Teodoro Escribano Ávilas

Director General of Cultural Cooperation for the Ministry of Culture
- In office 20 February 1987 – 16 September 1988
- Preceded by: Ana Puértolas Villanueva
- Succeeded by: Ángeles Gutiérrez Fraile

Government Delegate for the Autonomous Community of Castile and León
- In office 16 February 1990 – 30 July 1993
- Preceded by: Domingo Ferreiro Picado
- Succeeded by: Ángel Olivares Ramírez

Government Delegate for the Autonomous Community of Madrid
- In office 30 July 1993 – 9 December 1994
- Preceded by: Miguel Solans Soteras
- Succeeded by: María del Pilar Lledó Real

Personal details
- Born: 15 November 1943 Alcalá de Henares, Francoist Spain
- Died: 2 January 2021 (aged 77) Alcalá de Henares, Spain
- Party: PSOE

Arsenio Lope Huerta (15 November 1943 – 2 January 2021) was a Spanish writer and politician.

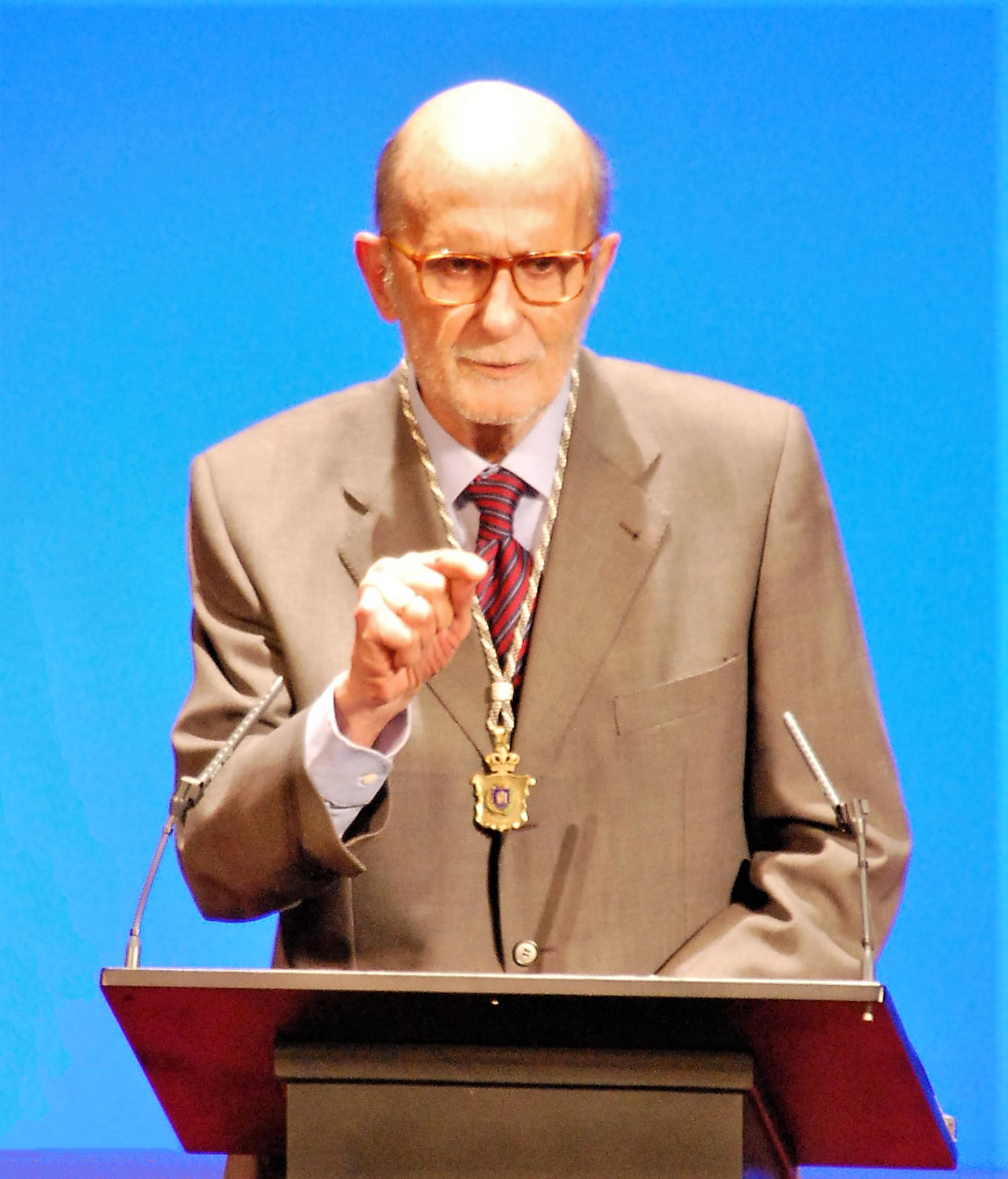

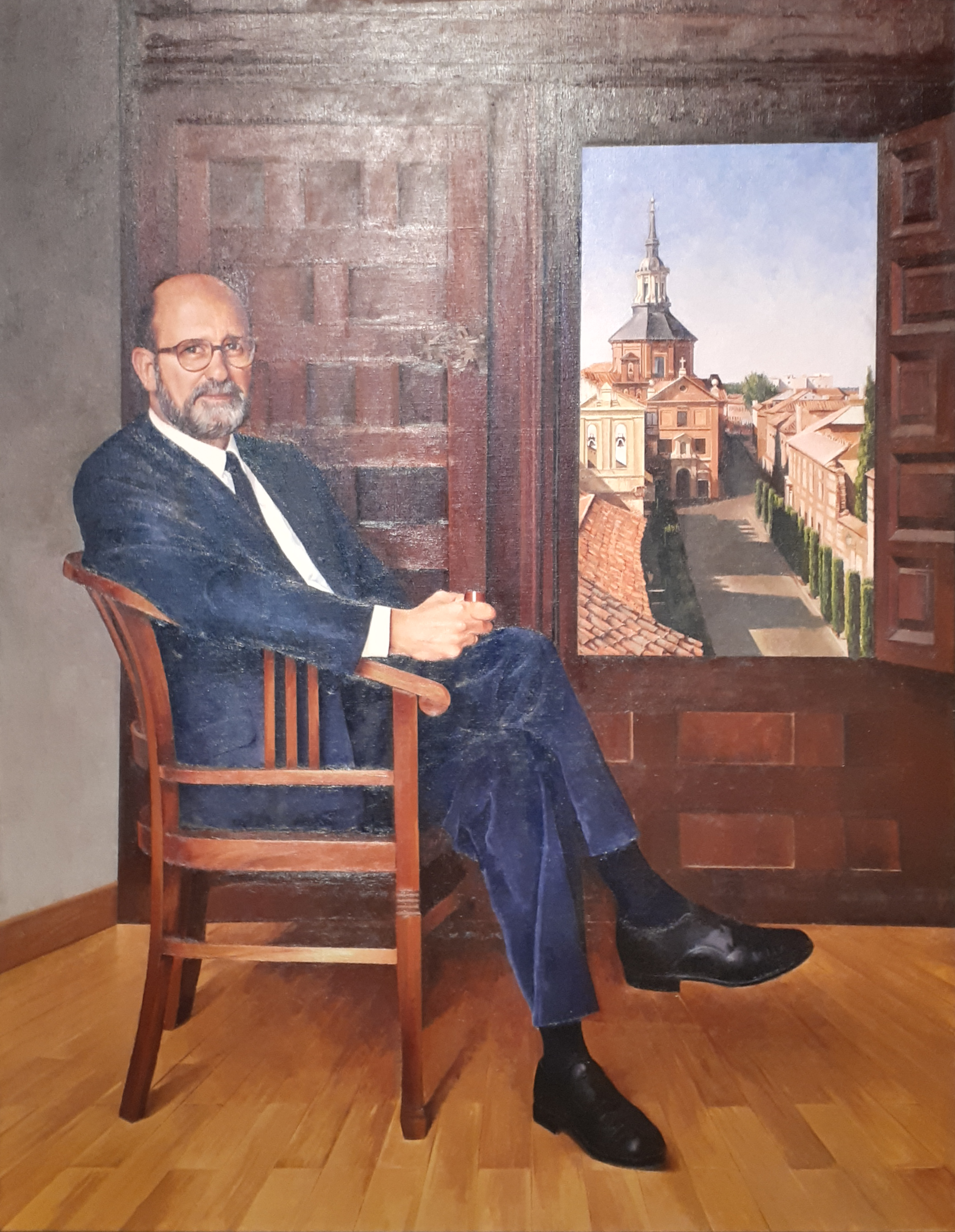

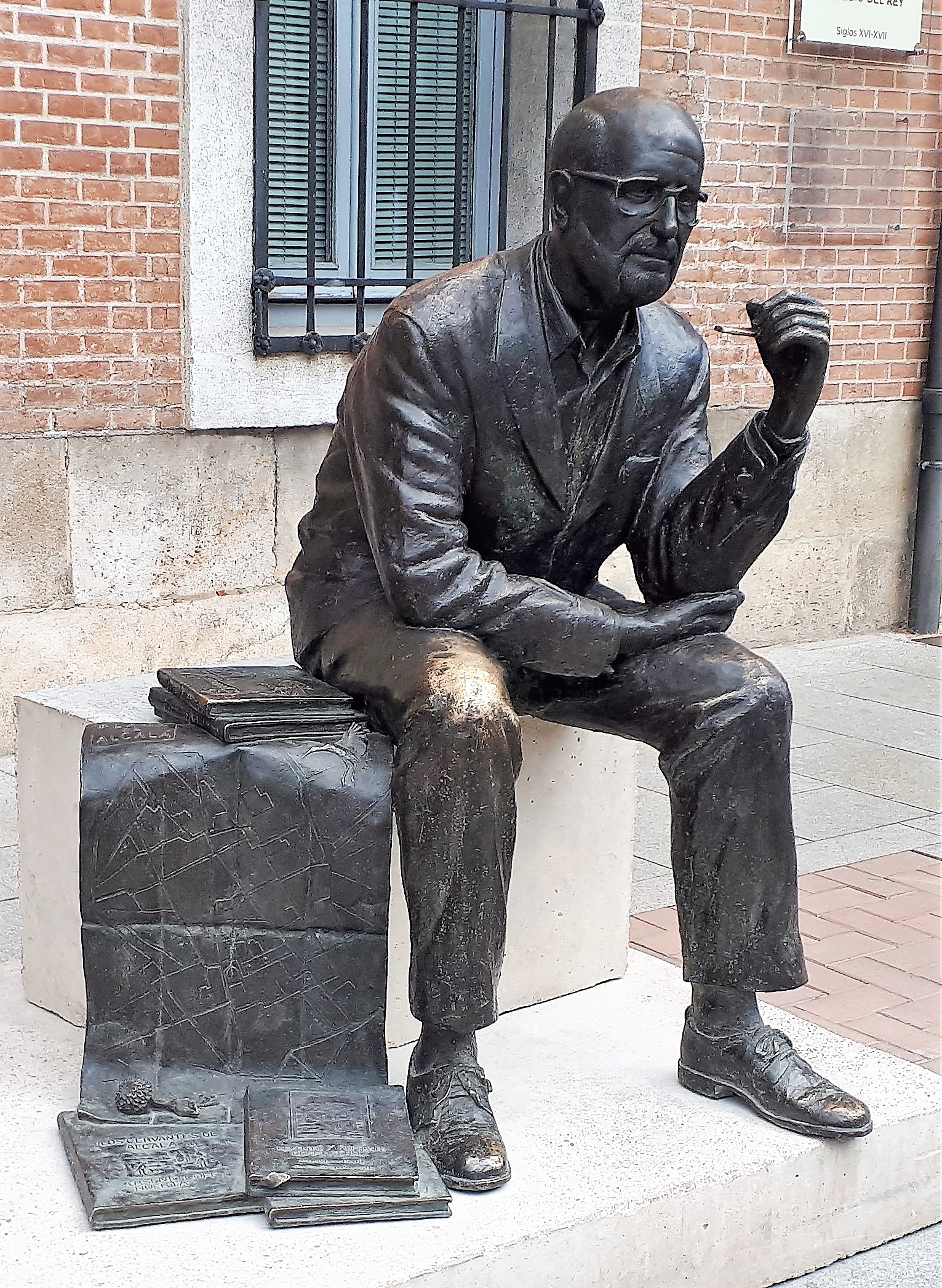

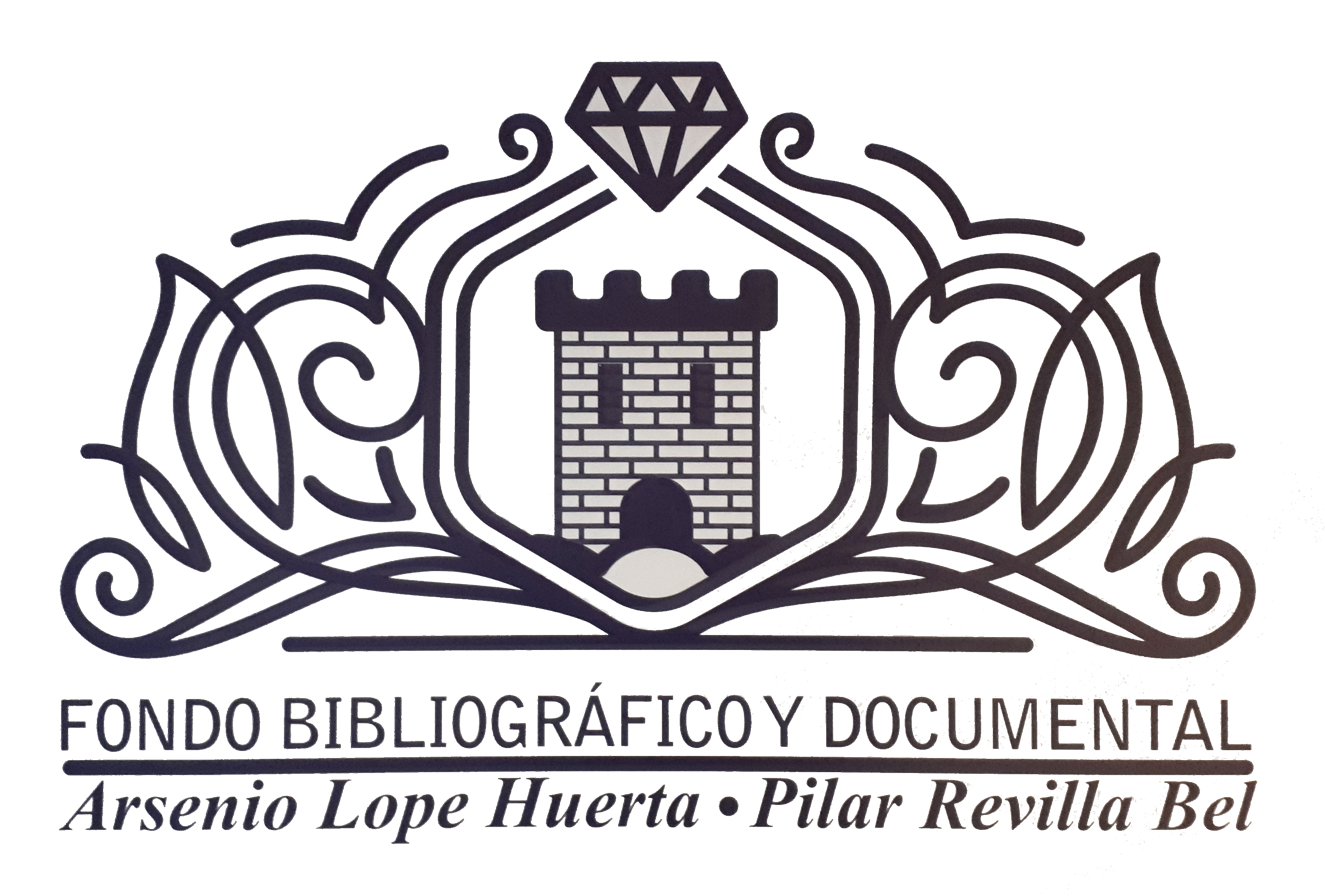
