= Pantelei Sandulache =

Moldovan politician (1956–2021)

Member of the Moldovan Parliament
- In office 17 April 1990 – 29 March 1994
- Constituency: Soroca

Pantelei Sandulache (4 May 1956 – 30 January 2021) was a Moldovan politician who served as a Member of Parliament between 1990 and 1994.
