= James L. Larson =

American historian (1931–2021)

James L. Larson (September 17, 1931 – January 9, 2021) was an American historian and Professor Emeritus at the University of California, Berkeley.

== Work ==
Larson earned his PhD at Berkeley with a dissertation entitled, "Speculation and experience: an inquiry into systematic description in the work of Carl von Linne." He completed his dissertation in 1965.

Larson is known for his work on the "early modern understandings of the natural and scientific world, and in particular, the work of Carl Linnaeus.

== Books ==
- Reforming the North: The Kingdoms and Churches of Scandinavia, 1520-1545 (2010) Cambridge.
- Interpreting Nature; The Science of Living Form from Linnaeus to Kant. Baltimore: Johns Hopkins University Press, 1994.
- Reason and Experience. The Representation of Natural Order in the Work of Carl von Linné, University of California Press, Berkeley, 1971.
