= Patrick Hull =

American entrepreneur (1966 - 2021

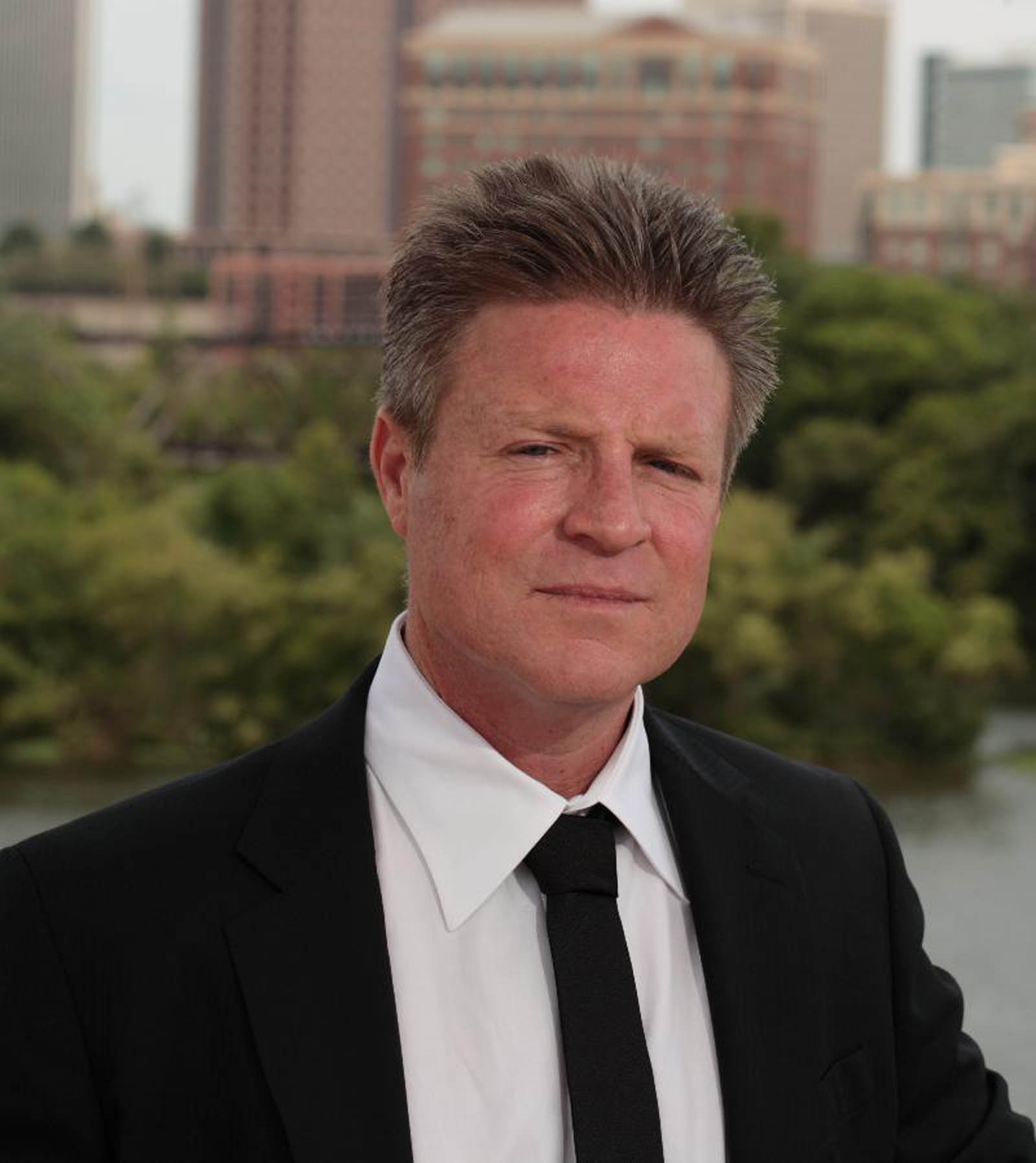
- Born: June 8, 1966; Louisville, Kentucky
- Died: January 2, 2021 (aged 54)
- Other name: Pat Hull
- Years active: 1998–2021
- Known for: Getloaded.com
- Website: phullholdings.com

Patrick M. Hull (June 8, 1966 – January 2, 2021) was an American entrepreneur based in Richmond, Virginia. He was known for co-founding Getloaded.com, a freight matching service that has enhanced logistics for long-haul truck drivers.

== Career ==
According to the Richmond Times-Dispatch, Hull was adopted at birth by John and Marianne Hull. In 1980, he started Cayman Inc while he was studying construction management at Virginia Tech. In 2009, he founded The Hull Foundation, which distributed gifts and stuffs to various humanitarian causes. Later in 2010, he founded Richmond Unite, which supported dozens of charities. In December, 2012 he joined as a contributor at Forbes.

In 2008, Getloaded.com was selected to participate in Virginia's VALET Program.

== Institutional positions ==
- CEO at Phull Holdings
- Founder of Richmond Unite
- Founder of ScoopMonkey

== Children ==
Patrick Hull has 3 children, Madison Hull, Madalyn Hull, and Benjamin (Cristelle) Hull.
