= Deaths in August 2021 =

The following is a list of notable deaths in August 2021.

Entries for each day are listed alphabetically by surname. A typical entry lists information in the following sequence:

- Name, age, country of citizenship at birth, subsequent country of citizenship (if applicable), reason for notability, cause of death (if known), and reference.

== August 2021 ==
=== 1 ===
- Abdalqadir as-Sufi, 91, Scottish Islamic scholar, founder of the Murabitun World Movement.
- Charles Baranyanka, 86, Burundian diplomat and historian, ambassador to France and Switzerland (1965–1967).
- David A. Gall, 79, Canadian-American Hall of Fame jockey.
- Dan Grayson, 54, American football player (Saskatchewan Roughriders).
- Guy Herbulot, 96, French Roman Catholic prelate, bishop of Évry-Corbeil-Essonnes (1978–2000).
- Omar Jazouli, 75, Moroccan politician, MP (since 1977) and mayor of Marrakesh (2003–2009), COVID-19.
- Kazimierz Kowalski, 70, Polish opera singer, opera manager and television presenter.
- Kyaw Hla Aung, 80, Burmese lawyer and civil rights activist.
- Armin Lemme, 65, German Olympic discus thrower (1980).
- Owenie McAuliffe, 89, Irish hurler and Gaelic footballer.
- Aliaksei Mzhachyk, 25, Belarusian Olympic weightlifter (2016), traffic collision.
- Kihi Ngatai, 91, New Zealand Māori leader, member of the Waitangi Tribunal.
- Mthokozisi Nxumalo, 32, South African politician, MP (since 2019), traffic collision.
- Rossana Ordóñez, 70, Venezuelan journalist, pancreatic cancer.
- Fiorentino Palmiotto, 92, Italian chess player, International Arbiter (1991).
- Abe E. Pierce III, 86, American politician, mayor of Monroe, Louisiana (1996–2000).
- Eddie Presland, 78, English footballer (West Ham United, Crystal Palace), cancer.
- Gino Renni, 78, Italian-Argentine actor and singer, complications from COVID-19.
- Vicente Rodríguez, 62, Paraguayan politician, deputy (since 2018) and governor of San Pedro (2013–2018), heart attack.
- Peter F. Schabarum, 92, American football player (San Francisco 49ers) and politician, member of the California State Assembly (1967–1972) and Los Angeles County Board of Supervisors (1972–1991).
- Beverly J. Shamana, 81, American Methodist bishop, complications from Parkinson's disease.
- Ilona Royce Smithkin, 101, Polish-born American artist, author and model.
- Vimla Sood, 98–99, Indian dentist, first female dentist in India.
- Stephen Szára, 98, Hungarian-American chemist.
- Ian Thomson, 92, English cricketer (national team).
- David Thorstad, 79, American political activist.
- Francisco Weffort, 84, Brazilian political scientist, minister of culture (1995–2002), heart attack.
- Tom York, 96, American television personality (WBRC).
- Yu Ying-shih, 91, Chinese-born American sinologist and historian.
- Jerry Ziesmer, 82, American assistant director and actor (Apocalypse Now, Jerry Maguire, The Bad News Bears Go to Japan).

=== 2 ===
- Alfonso Álvarez Gándara, 82, Spanish politician and lawyer, secretary-general of Partido Galeguista (1981–1982).
- Lilia Aragón, 82, Mexican actress (De frente al sol, Más allá del puente, Velo de novia) and politician, deputy (2004–2006).
- Rolf Arfwidsson, 93, Swedish curler.
- Hendrik Born, 77, German naval officer, chief of the Volksmarine (1989–1990).
- Robert H. Burnside, 88, American politician, member of the South Carolina House of Representatives (1971–1978).
- Emilio Bianchi Di Cárcano, 91, Argentine Roman Catholic prelate, bishop of Azul (1982–2006).
- Rafael Carmona, 48, Puerto Rican baseball player (Seattle Mariners).
- Alicinha Cavalcanti, 59, Brazilian events promoter, complications from amyotrophic lateral sclerosis.
- June Daugherty, 64, American college basketball coach (Boise State Broncos, Washington Huskies, Washington State Cougars).
- Ged Dunn, 74, English rugby league footballer (Hull Kingston Rovers, national team).
- Elbjørg Fjære, 88, Norwegian politician, deputy MP (1973–1977, 1981–1985).
- Thor Helland, 84, Norwegian Olympic long-distance runner (1964).
- Allen Hill, 84, British chemist.
- Ruth Horam, 90, Israeli painter and sculptor.
- Hideki Hosaka, 49, Japanese professional wrestler (FMW, AJPW, Zero-One), colon and liver cancer.
- Ursula Kraus, 91, German politician, member of the Landtag of North Rhine-Westphalia (1984–1990) and mayor of Wuppertal (1984–1996).
- Elias John Kwandikwa, 55, Tanzanian politician, MP (since 2015) and minister of defence (since 2020).
- Marc Lieberman, 72, American humanitarian, prostate cancer.
- Kalyani Menon, 80, Indian playback singer (Nallathoru Kudumbam, Pudhiya Mannargal, Paarthale Paravasam).
- Nelliyode Vasudevan Namboodiri, 81, Indian Kathakali artist, pancreatic cancer.
- Luigi Paleari, 79, Italian footballer (Como 1907, A.S.D. Fanfulla).
- Runoko Rashidi, 67, American historian, author and scholar.
- Fatima Regragui, 80, Moroccan actress.
- Diego Rosas Anaya, 31, Mexican politician, State of Mexico deputy-elect, heart attack.
- Dave Severance, 102, American Marine Corps colonel (Battle of Iwo Jima).
- Peter Smith, Baron Smith of Leigh, 76, British politician and life peer, member of the House of Lords (since 1999).
- Allan Stephenson, 71, British-born South African composer, cellist, and conductor.
- Antonio de la Torre Villalpando, 69, Mexican footballer (América, Puebla, national team).
- Yves de Wasseige, 95, Belgian politician and economist, senator (1979–1991).
- Derek Williams, 91, British documentary film director (The Tide of Traffic, The Shetland Experience) and writer.
- John Zulberti, 54, American college lacrosse player (Syracuse Orange), drowned.

=== 3 ===
- Saggaf bin Muhammad Aljufri, 83, Indonesian Islamic scholar.
- Julian Beale, 86, Australian businessman and politician, MP (1984–1996).
- Allan Blazek, 71, American record producer, mixer and audio engineer.
- Jocelyne Bourassa, 74, Canadian golfer (LPGA).
- Duke Carmel, 84, American baseball player (St. Louis Cardinals).
- Jerry Carter, 66, American politician and pastor, member of the North Carolina House of Representatives (since 2019), complications from surgery.
- Tommy Curtis, 69, American college basketball player (UCLA Bruins), NCAA champion (1972, 1973).
- Đỗ Quang Em, 79, Vietnamese painter.
- Sir John Enderby, 90, British physicist.
- Eric Freeman, 51, American artist.
- Noel Guzmán Boffil Rojas, 66, Cuban painter and poet, COVID-19.
- Jean Hale, 82, American actress (In Like Flint).
- Jody Hamilton, 82, American professional wrestler (GCW), promoter (DSW) and trainer (WCW Power Plant).
- Kelli Hand, 56, American musician and DJ, arteriosclerotic cardiovascular disease.
- Arthur Dion Hanna, 93, Bahamian politician, governor-general (2006–2010).
- Jergé Hoefdraad, 35, Dutch footballer (RKC Waalwijk, Almere City, Telstar), complications from gunshot wounds.
- Elizabeth Anne Hull, 84, American academic and political activist.
- Khin Maung Win, 80, Burmese mathematician.
- Yūsuke Kinoshita, 27, Japanese baseball player (Chunichi Dragons), cardiopulmonary arrest.
- Fred Ladd, 94, American television producer.
- Jørgen Langhelle, 55, Norwegian actor (Elling, I Am Dina, The Thing), cardiac arrest.
- Miroslav Lazanski, 70, Serbian politician and diplomat, deputy (2016–2019) and ambassador to Russia (since 2019).
- Noel Lynch, 74, Irish politician, member of the London Assembly (2003–2004).
- Brian Maunsell, 83, New Zealand Olympic boxer (1964).
- María Teresa Marú Mejía, 62, Mexican politician, deputy (since 2018), COVID-19.
- Kazem Mohammadi, 47, Iranian futsal player (Tam Iran Khodro, national team), COVID-19.
- Pierre Montaz, 97, French cable transport engineer.
- Lorris Murail, 70, French author.
- Marcia Nasatir, 95, American film producer (Hamburger Hill, Ironweed, Vertical Limit) and studio executive.
- Antonio Pennacchi, 71, Italian writer, Strega Prize winner (2010), heart attack.
- John P. Shanley Jr., 77, American politician.
- Nader Shariatmadari, 60, Iranian politician and geotechnical engineer, member of the Islamic City Council of Tehran (2003–2007), COVID-19.
- Gholam Hosein Shiri Aliabad, 60, Iranian politician, MP (2012–2016), complications from COVID-19.
- Vitaly Shishov, 26, Belarusian human rights activist.
- Soerjadi Soedirdja, 82, Indonesian politician, governor of Jakarta (1992–1997).
- Catherine Squires, 80, American microbiologist.
- José Ramos Tinhorão, 93, Brazilian music critic and journalist, pneumonia.
- Godfred Yeboah, 41, Ghanaian footballer (Asante Kotoko, All Stars, national team).

=== 4 ===
- R. Aravamudan, 84, Indian aerospace engineer.
- Aleksandr Aravin, 63, Russian film director.
- Razzy Bailey, 82, American country musician ("Midnight Hauler", "She Left Love All Over Me", "I Keep Coming Back").
- Toupta Boguena, Chadian agronomist, minister of health (2010–2011), secretary of the Niger Basin Authority (since 2016).
- Karl Heinz Bohrer, 88, German literary scholar and essayist.
- Zelá Brambillé, 27, Mexican writer and novelist, COVID-19.
- Jean "Binta" Breeze, 65, Jamaican dub poet, chronic obstructive pulmonary disease.
- Cándani, 56, Surinamese-Dutch poet, writer, and painter, cancer.
- Robert Crawford, 80, British-born New Zealand psychiatrist.
- Bobby Eaton, 62, American professional wrestler (JCP, WCW, SMW).
- Richard T. Farmer, 86, American businessman and philanthropist, founder and CEO of Cintas (1968–2003).
- Dick Farrel, 65, American radio host, complications from COVID-19.
- María Ester Feres, 78, Chilean politician and academic.
- Martin Graff, 77, French writer and cabaretist.
- Aimé Halbeher, 85, French political activist and syndicalist.
- Paul Johnson, 50, American DJ ("Get Get Down") and record producer, COVID-19.
- Melbourne Kimsey, 90, American brigadier general.
- David Lee, 80, American jazz drummer and composer.
- John H. Logie, 81, American politician, mayor of Grand Rapids, Michigan (1991–2003), complications from Alzheimer's disease.
- Åke Lundqvist, 85, Swedish actor (Beck – Mannen med ikonerna).
- Graham McRae, 81, New Zealand racing driver.
- Adrian R. Morrison, 84, American neuroscientist.
- Dominic Oneya, 73, Nigerian civil servant, administrator of Kano State (1996–1998) and Benue State (1998–1999).
- J. R. Richard, 71, American baseball player (Houston Astros), complications from COVID-19.
- Padma Sachdev, 81, Indian poet and novelist.
- Bo Scott, 78, American football player (Cleveland Browns, Ottawa Rough Riders).
- Dario Sorrentino, 64, Italian medical researcher, traffic collision.
- Moisés Torres, 72, Bolivian journalist, professor and politician, deputy (1997–2002), COVID-19.
- Betty Lou Varnum, 90, American television presenter (The Magic Window).
- Oddlaug Vereide, 88, Norwegian politician, deputy MP (1989–1994).
- Nach Waxman, 84, American bookseller, septic shock.
- Tachi Yamada, 76, Japanese-born American physician and gastroenterologist.
- Laurence R. Young, 85, American physicist.

=== 5 ===
- Maurice Brun, 96, French politician, mayor of Montluçon (1972–1977) and deputy (1973–1978).
- Peter Corby, 97, British inventor (Trouser press).
- Terry Davies, 87, Welsh rugby union player (Swansea, British & Irish Lions, national team).
- Hanns Eckelkamp, 94, German film producer (The Marriage of Maria Braun).
- Guillermo González, 80, Colombian engineer and politician, mayor of Popayán (1977–1978), minister of national defense (1997), and governor of Cauca (2008–2011).
- Reg Gorman, 89, Australian actor (The Sullivans, Fergus McPhail, Neighbours), cancer.
- Eloise Greenfield, 91, American author (The Great Migration: Journey to the North).
- Brian Henderson, 89, New Zealand-born Australian radio and television presenter (Nine News Sydney, Bandstand), kidney cancer.
- Hassaballah El Kafrawy, 90, Egyptian politician, governor of Damietta (1976–1977) and minister of housing (1977–1993).
- Roger Lenaers, 96, Belgian-born Austrian Jesuit pastor.
- Leon Litwack, 91, American historian (Been in the Storm So Long), Pulitzer Prize winner (1980), bladder cancer.
- E. Madhusudhanan, 80, Indian politician, Tamil Nadu MLA (1991–1996).
- Yevhen Marchuk, 80, Ukrainian politician, prime minister (1995–1996), deputy (1995–2000), and minister of defence (2003–2004), COVID-19.
- Jan Mayman, 80, Australian journalist (The Sunday Times, The Age, The Canberra Times).
- S. S. Narayan, 86, Indian Olympic footballer (1956, 1960), cardiac arrest.
- Jane Ngwenya, 86, Zimbabwean politician, MP (1980–1985).
- Gábor Novák, 87, Hungarian sprint canoer, Olympic silver medalist (1952).
- Murray Rose, 81, New Zealand politician, MP (1969–1972).
- Geoffrey Scott, 83, Canadian politician, MP (1978–1993).
- Andrei Strâmbeanu, 86, Moldovan writer and politician, deputy (1998–2001).
- Richard Trumka, 72, American labor leader, president of the AFL–CIO (since 2009) and the United Mine Workers (1982–1995), heart attack.
- Vito Valentinetti, 92, American baseball player (Chicago Cubs, Washington Senators, Cleveland Indians).
- Walter Wangerin Jr., 77, American author (The Book of the Dun Cow).
- Russ Washington, 74, American football player (San Diego Chargers).
- Graeme Whitnall, 69, Australian footballer (Carlton).

=== 6 ===
- Mikel Azurmendi, 78, Spanish anthropologist, ETA dissident and writer, co-founder of Foro Ermua and ¡Basta Ya!.
- Noureddine Bahbouh, 72, Algerian politician, minister of agriculture (1994–1995) and agriculture and fisheries (1995–1997), member of the People's National Assembly (1997–2002).
- Barry, American barred owl, traffic collision.
- Margaret Bourke, 75, Australian bridge player, melanoma.
- José Carreira Marques, 77, Portuguese politician, member of the Constituent Assembly (1975–1976), deputy (1976–1982) and mayor of Beja (1983–2005), cardiac arrest.
- Francesco Dibenedetto, 80, Italian football manager (Matera Calcio, Bisceglie, U.S.D. Città di Fasano).
- Rita Pitka Blumenstein, 88, American Yup'ik traditional healer.
- Stefano Di Marino, 60, Italian novelist and translator, suicide by jumping.
- Christian Dumont, 58, French Olympic biathlete (1988, 1992), heart attack.
- Ed Emery, 71, American politician, member of the Missouri House of Representatives (2003–2011) and Senate (2013–2021).
- Salvador Escrihuela, 70, Spanish footballer (Sabadell, Granada, Alavés).
- Aryeh Gamliel, 70, Israeli rabbi and politician, member of the Knesset (1988–2003).
- Einar Holm, 87, Norwegian politician, deputy MP (1981–1985).
- Babulal Jain, 86, Indian politician, Madhya Pradesh MLA (1977–1980).
- Donald Kagan, 89, Lithuanian-born American historian.
- Richard Konvička, 64, Czech painter.
- Teresa Miller, 59, American author, legal scholar, and educator, gallbladder cancer.
- John A. Rizzo, 73, American attorney.
- Herbert Schlosser, 95, American television executive, president and CEO of NBC (1974–1978).
- Tigor Silaban, 68, Indonesian doctor.
- Oleg Shapovalov, 58, Ukrainian politician, president of the Kharkiv Oblast Council (2005–2006).
- Jakob Skarstein, 100, Norwegian journalist.
- Yevgen Sotnikov, 40, Ukrainian judoka and convicted murderer, shot.
- Yuri Trutnev, 93, Russian theoretical physicist and nuclear engineer.
- Mark Turpin, 64, American tennis player.
- Les Vandyke, 90, English singer and songwriter ("What Do You Want?", "Poor Me", "Well I Ask You").
- Wang Wenjuan, 94, Chinese Yue opera performer.

=== 7 ===
- Dalal Abdel Aziz, 61, Egyptian actress (A Girl's Secret, Sorry for the Disturbance, El Ashash), complications from COVID-19.
- Akhudiat, 75, Indonesian poet.
- Brad Allan, 48, Australian martial artist, action choreographer, and stunt performer (Rush Hour 2, Scott Pilgrim vs. the World, Solo: A Star Wars Story).
- Rolf Erling Andersen, 74, Norwegian politician, deputy MP (1997–2005).
- Julio César Anderson, 73, Guatemalan footballer (C.S.D. Municipal, national team).
- Douglas Applegate, 93, American politician, member of the U.S. House of Representatives (1977–1995).
- Paul Bragdon, 94, American academic.
- John Caddy, 83, American poet.
- Robbie Cooke, 64, English footballer (Peterborough United, Cambridge United, Brentford), cancer.
- Alma Cullen, 83, British television writer (Inspector Morse) and playwright.
- Mike De Palmer, 59, American tennis player and coach (Boris Becker), pancreatic cancer.
- John Dickinson, 87, English rugby league player (St Helens).
- Sir Patrick Forrest, 98, Scottish surgeon.
- Andrew Fulton, 94, Canadian vice admiral.
- Magda Godia, 68, Spanish politician, mayor of Mequinenza (since 2003) and member of the Cortes of Aragon (2013–2015), cancer.
- José Gómez del Moral, 89, Spanish road racing cyclist.
- Johnny Groth, 95, American baseball player (Detroit Tigers, Chicago White Sox, Kansas City Athletics).
- Robert Martin Gumbura, 65, Zimbabwean preacher and convicted rapist, COVID-19.
- Carol Harris, 98, American Hall of Fame Quarter Horse equestrian, cancer.
- Martin Kay, 85–86, British computer scientist.
- Albert B. Lewis, 95, American politician, member of the New York State Senate (1967–1972, 1973–1978).
- Hung Liu, 73, Chinese-born American artist, pancreatic cancer.
- Lily Lodge, 91, American acting coach and actress (Mona Lisa Smile).
- Isabel Martínez, 75, Mexican actress and comedian, heart attack.
- Trevor Moore, 41, American comedian (The Whitest Kids U' Know) and actor (Miss March), fall.
- Purnendu Sekhar Mukherjee, Indian politician, chronic obstructive pulmonary disease.
- Keith Patchel, 65, American musician and composer.
- Alfredo Petit-Vergel, 85, Cuban Roman Catholic prelate, auxiliary bishop of San Cristóbal de la Habana (1991–2016).
- Markie Post, 70, American actress (Night Court, The Fall Guy, Hearts Afire), cancer.
- Amando Samo, 72, Micronesian Roman Catholic prelate, bishop of Caroline Islands (1995–2020).
- Larry Swider, 66, American football player (Detroit Lions, St. Louis Cardinals, Tampa Bay Buccaneers).
- Dennis "Dee Tee" Thomas, 70, American saxophonist (Kool & the Gang).
- Michael M. Thomas, 85, American writer.
- Werner Tochtermann, 87, German chemist.
- Mohammad Hadis Uddin, 72, Bangladeshi police officer, IGP (2005), COVID-19.
- Melinda Vigh, 39, Hungarian sport climber, fall.
- Mark Weedon, 53, New Zealand rugby union player (Bay of Plenty, North Harbour, Wasps).
- Willie Williamson, 76, American football coach (Albany State Golden Rams).
- Jane Withers, 95, American actress (Giant, The Hunchback of Notre Dame, Paddy O'Day).
- Gary Lee Yoder, 75, American musician (The Oxford Circle, Blue Cheer).
- Wasi Zafar, 72, Pakistani lawyer and politician, MP (2002–2008) and minister of law and justice (2006–2007).

=== 8 ===
- Bobby Bowden, 91, American Hall of Fame college football coach (Florida State, West Virginia), pancreatic cancer.
- Paul Brewster, 85, American college football coach (Austin Peay).
- Sarah Broadie, 79, British philosopher.
- Najma Chowdhury, 79, Bangladeshi academic, COVID-19.
- Ken Clark, 73, English-born Canadian football player (Hamilton Tiger-Cats, Saskatchewan Roughriders, Los Angeles Rams).
- Bruce Conte, 71, American guitarist (Tower of Power), leukemia.
- Bill Davis, 92, Canadian politician, Ontario MPP (1959–1985) premier (1971–1985).
- Aleksej Demjanov, 47, Croatian-Russian Olympic gymnast (1996).
- Christian Penda Ekoka, 69, Cameroonian government official.
- Vera Fusek, 89, Czechoslovak-born British actress (The Great Van Robbery, Doctor Who).
- Lila R. Gleitman, 91, American academic (University of Pennsylvania).
- Maria José Gonzaga, 75, Brazilian businesswoman, philanthropist and politician, mayor of Tatuí (since 2017), abdominal cancer.
- Perry Harris, 75, New Zealand rugby union player (Manawatu, national team).
- Paul Hellyer, 98, Canadian politician, MP (1949–1974), minister of national defence (1963–1967) and transport (1967–1969), complications from a fall.
- Ben Kamin, 68, American rabbi, heart failure.
- Stefan Kapłaniak, 88, Polish Olympic sprint canoer, bronze medalist (1960).
- Jaan Kaplinski, 80, Estonian poet, translator, and philosopher, complications from amyotrophic lateral sclerosis.
- Garry Kennedy, 85, Canadian artist and educator.
- Fernando López de Olmedo, Spanish general commander of Ceuta (Perejil Island crisis), COVID-19.
- Mohammad Reza Madhi, Iranian alleged intelligence agent.
- Colum McKinstry, 71, Irish Gaelic football player (Clan na Gael, Armagh).
- Hosa Wells Okunbo, 63, Nigerian oil executive and philanthropist, cancer.
- Adelaide Pereira da Silva, 93, Brazilian pianist, composer and painter.
- Luciano Pérez de Acevedo, 78, Spanish politician and lawyer, president of the province of Badajoz (1979–1983) and member of the Assembly of Extremadura (1983–1987).
- Mark Perry, 70, American author, cancer.
- Tindivanam K. Ramamurthy, 86, Indian politician, Tamil Nadu MLA (1967–1971) and MP (1984–1990).
- Hipólito Reyes Larios, 74, Mexican Roman Catholic prelate, archbishop of Xalapa (since 2007) and bishop of Orizaba (2000–2007), internal hemorrhage.
- Oleksandr Rojtburd, 59, Ukrainian painter and installation artist, director of the Odesa Fine Arts Museum (2018–2019), cancer.
- Cesare Salvadori, 79, Italian fencer, Olympic champion (1972).
- Bonnie Sherk, 76, American artist.
- Anupam Shyam, 63, Indian actor (Hazaaron Khwaishein Aisi, Slumdog Millionaire, The Curse of King Tut's Tomb), multiple organ failure.
- Harry Smith, 91, American bowler.
- Pierre Sprey, 84, French-born American defence analyst (Fighter Mafia) and record producer, founder of Mapleshade Records.

=== 9 ===
- Joey Ambrose, 87, American Hall of Fame saxophonist (Bill Haley & His Comets).
- Rand Araskog, 89, American businessman, CEO of ITT Corporation (1979–1998).
- Aung Cheint, 73, Burmese poet.
- Sir Lester Bird, 83, Antiguan politician, prime minister (1994–2004).
- Cameron Burrell, 26, American sprinter, suicide by gunshot.
- María Elena Chapa, 77, Mexican politician and women's rights activist, deputy (1988–1991, 2000–2003) and senator (1991–1997), cancer.
- Carlton H. Colwell, 95, American politician, member of the Georgia House of Representatives (1964–1995).
- Alex Cord, 88, American actor (Airwolf, Stagecoach, The Brotherhood).
- Neal Craig, 73, American football player (Cincinnati Bengals, Buffalo Bills, Cleveland Browns).
- Gord Cruickshank, 56, Canadian ice hockey player (Maine Mariners).
- Kasargod Patnashetti Gopal Rao, 94, Indian naval officer (Operation Trident).
- Roy F. Guste, 69, American author, photographer and culinary historian.
- Pat Hitchcock, 93, English-born American actress (Stage Fright, Strangers on a Train, Psycho).
- František Hrúzik, 94, Slovak Olympic equestrian (1960).
- Ken Hutchison, 72, Scottish actor (Straw Dogs, All Quiet on the Western Front, Ladyhawke).
- Ryszard Jarzembowski, 75, Polish politician and journalist, senator (1991–2005).
- Bob Jenkins, 73, American motorsports announcer (ESPN, ABC, NBC Sports), brain cancer.
- Killer Kau, 23, South African rapper, dancer, and record producer, traffic collision.
- Joseph Koterski, 67, American Jesuit priest, philosopher and author.
- Sergei Kovalev, 91, Russian human rights activist and politician, deputy (1993–2003).
- Jean-Marie Léonard, 78, Belgian politician, deputy (1990–1995), Walloon deputy (1990–2004).
- Viktor Likhonosov, 85, Russian writer, COVID-19.
- Olivier Maire, 60, French Roman Catholic priest, homicide.
- Mpura, 25, South African rapper, record producer, and fashion designer, traffic collision.
- Annette Muller, 88, French writer and Holocaust survivor.
- Michael H. Newlin, 95, American diplomat.
- Arthur Norberg, 83, American historian.
- Craig Ogletree, 53, American football player (Cincinnati Bengals), complications from COVID-19.
- Olivia Podmore, 24, New Zealand Olympic cyclist (2016).
- Peter Richter de Rangenier, 91, Czech-born Austrian composer and conductor.
- Ingrid Remmers, 56, German politician, MP (since 2017).
- Ian Russell, 86, English Anglican priest, Archdeacon of Coventry (1989–2000).
- Saranya Sasi, 35, Indian actress (Maanikyan, Chotta Mumbai, Annmariya Kalippilaanu), cancer.
- Siti Sarah, 36, Malaysian singer and actress, COVID-19.
- Lynn Staheli, 87, American pediatric orthopedist.
- Earl Taft, 89, American mathematician.
- Nadir Tedeschi, 90, Italian politician, deputy (1976–1987).
- Chucky Thompson, 53, American record producer (Bad Boy Records), complications from COVID-19.
- Naftali Tishby, 68, Israeli computer scientist.
- Ary Ribeiro Valadão, 102, Brazilian lawyer and politician, Goiás MLA (1959–1967), deputy (1967–1979, 1989–1991), and governor of Goiás (1979–1983).
- Walter Yetnikoff, 87, American music industry executive (CBS Records International), cancer.
- Zairaini Sarbini, 48, Malaysian voice actress, cervical cancer.

=== 10 ===
- Gun Ädel, 82, Swedish Olympic cross-country skier (1964).
- Sabina Ajrula, 75, Macedonian-Turkish actress (Muhteşem Yüzyıl, My Mother's Wound, Shadows), brain cancer.
- Stanley Amis, 97, British architect.
- Georgios Birmbilis, 76, Greek Olympic hurdler (1968).
- Júlio Chaves, 76, Brazilian voice actor, COVID-19.
- Neal Conan, 71, American radio journalist (Talk of the Nation), glioblastoma.
- Tony Esposito, 78, Canadian-American Hall of Fame ice hockey player (Chicago Black Hawks, Montreal Canadiens), Stanley Cup champion (1969), pancreatic cancer.
- Petr Esterka, 85, Czech Roman Catholic prelate, auxiliary bishop of Brno (1999–2013) and titular bishop of Cefala (since 1999).
- Michael Gaudion, 83, Australian footballer (North Melbourne).
- Tamara Jozi, 64, South African actress (Isibaya, Reyka) and television personality.
- Maki Kaji, 69, Japanese businessman, president of Nikoli and creator of Sudoku, bile duct cancer.
- Michel Le Flochmoan, 69, French football player and manager (Sedan, R.E. Virton, F91 Dudelange).
- Giorgio Lopez, 74, Italian voice actor, dubbing director and theatre director.
- Cary M. Maguire, 93, American businessman and philanthropist.
- Samuel Marful-Sau, 64, Ghanaian jurist, judge of the Supreme Court (since 2018).
- Eduardo Martínez Somalo, 94, Spanish Roman Catholic cardinal, camerlengo of the Holy Roman Church (1993–2007), prefect of the CICLSAL (1992–2004) and apostolic nuncio to Colombia (1975–1979).
- Don McKechnie, 77, New Zealand cricketer (Otago) and cricket umpire.
- Rich Oganiru, 64, Nigerian actor.
- Lev Pidlisetskyi, 44, Ukrainian politician and entrepreneur, MP (2014–2019).
- Dudley Price, 89, Welsh footballer (Swansea City, Hull City, Southend United).
- John Riordan, 85, New Zealand jockey.
- Robert A. Rowan, 85, American politician.
- Vincent M. Russo, 90, American lieutenant general.
- Kirpal Singh, 95, Indian naval officer.
- Mirjana Stefanović, 81, Serbian writer.
- Pio Teek, 74, Namibian judge, justice of the Supreme Court (2003–2005).
- Naga Thein Hlaing, 87, Burmese surgeon.
- Dilys Watling, 78, English actress (Calculated Risk, Two Left Feet, Theatre of Death).
- Peter Whittle, 94, New Zealand mathematician and statistician.
- Stephen Wilkinson, 102, English choral conductor and composer.

=== 11 ===
- Geneviève Asse, 98, French painter.
- Marco Borradori, 62, Swiss politician, national councillor (1991–1995) and mayor of Lugano (since 2013), heart attack.
- Clyde Evans, 83, American politician, member of the Ohio House of Representatives (2003–2010).
- Mike Finnigan, 76, American keyboardist and vocalist, kidney cancer.
- Peter Fleischmann, 84, German film director (Hunting Scenes from Bavaria, Weak Spot, Hard to Be a God) and screenwriter.
- Adela Forestello, 98, Argentine human rights activist (Mothers of the Plaza 25 de Mayo).
- Roy Gaines, 83, American blues guitarist.
- Gianluigi Gelmetti, 75, Italian-Monégasque conductor and composer, director of the Teatro dell'Opera di Roma (2000–2009).
- Benoît Genecand, 57, Swiss politician, national councilor (2015–2019), cancer.
- Dick Huddart, 85, English rugby league player (St. Helens, St. George, national team).
- Paulo José, 84, Brazilian actor (The Priest and the Girl, Macunaíma, The Clown), pneumonia.
- Michel Laclotte, 91, French art historian, director of the Louvre (1987–1995).
- Abdelhamid Laghouati, 77, Algerian poet.
- Guy Lalumière, 91, Canadian graphic designer and photographer.
- Sir David Levene, 91, New Zealand businessman and philanthropist.
- Stanley Okoro, 28, Nigerian actor, food poisoning.
- Caroline Peyton, 69, American singer-songwriter.
- Adam Sadowsky, 50, American entrepreneur and actor (It's Your Move, Second Chance).
- Hugo Salas Wenzel, 85, Chilean military officer and convicted murderer.
- Ernst-Ludwig Schwandner, 83, German architecture historian and archaeologist.
- Heidi Schelhowe, 72, German university professor.
- Miroslav Tetter, 83, Czech academic and politician, mayor of České Budějovice (1998–2006, 2010).
- Rejoice Timire, 62, Zimbabwean activist and politician, senator (since 2018), COVID-19.
- Carveth Thompson, 88, American politician, member of the South Dakota House of Representatives (1968–1972).
- Bill Todd, 91, Canadian football player (Saskatchewan Roughriders, Winnipeg Blue Bombers).
- Lorna Toolis, 68, Canadian librarian.
- Claudio Ventura, 67, Italian film director and editor.
- Ernst van de Wetering, 83, Dutch art historian.
- Göran Zachrisson, 83, Swedish sports journalist, cancer.
- Yehoshua Zuckerman, 83, Belgian-born Israeli rabbi.

=== 12 ===
- Kurt Biedenkopf, 91, German politician, MP (1976–1980, 1987–1990) and minister-president of Saxony (1990–2002).
- Ronnell Bright, 91, American jazz pianist.
- Brian P. Burns, 85, American entrepreneur, attorney and philanthropist.
- Durdana Butt, 83, Pakistani actress (Ruswai, Tanhaiyaan, Tanhaiyan Naye Silsilay), COVID-19.
- Haydée Coloso-Espino, 83, Filipino Olympic swimmer (1960).
- Tony Coop, 87, British golfer.
- Dominic DeNucci, 89, Italian-American Hall of Fame professional wrestler (Stampede Wrestling, WCW, WWWF) and trainer, heart failure.
- Eva Fastag, 104, Polish-born Belgian Holocaust survivor.
- Jay Greenberg, 71, American sports journalist (The Kansas City Star, Philadelphia Daily News, New York Post).
- Karl-Friedrich Haas, 90, German sprinter, Olympic silver medalist (1956).
- Stanislav Hanzík, 90, Czech sculptor.
- Roger Harring, 88, American Hall of Fame college football coach (Wisconsin-La Crosse).
- Claude Javeau, 80, Belgian sociologist and professor.
- Robin Judah, 91, British Olympic sailor.
- João Lyra, 90, Brazilian politician, senator (1989–1991) and deputy (2003–2007, 2011–2015).
- Tarcísio Meira, 85, Brazilian actor (Irmãos Coragem, Sangue e Areia, Espelho Mágico), COVID-19.
- Robert Orr, 68, American business executive, ambassador to the Asian Development Bank (2010–2016).
- Jose P. Perez, 74, Filipino jurist, associate justice of the Supreme Court (2009–2016).
- Pyotr Pimashkov, 73, Russian politician, mayor of Krasnoyarsk (1996–2011) and deputy (since 2011).
- Blair Reynolds, 59, American role-playing game artist, complications from a heart defect.
- Peter Ryan, 84, Australian footballer (South Melbourne).
- K. Schippers, 84, Dutch poet.
- Alfonso Sepúlveda, 82, Chilean footballer (Club Universidad de Chile).
- Hadiza Shagari, 80, Nigerian socialite, first lady (1979–1983), COVID-19.
- Matthias U Shwe, 77, Burmese Roman Catholic prelate, auxiliary bishop (1979–1989) and bishop of Taunggyi (1989–2015).
- Una Stubbs, 84, English actress (Till Death Us Do Part, Worzel Gummidge, Sherlock).
- Igael Tumarkin, 87, Israeli painter and sculptor.
- Andrew Walls, 93, British Christianity scholar.
- Stephen Wiesner, 78, American-Israeli research physicist.

=== 13 ===
- Arctic Owl, 27, British Thoroughbred racehorse. (death announced on this date)
- Carlos Ardila Lülle, 91, Colombian entrepreneur, founder of Organización Ardila Lülle.
- Alia Muhammad Baker, 69, Iraqi librarian, COVID-19.
- Osório Bebber, 92, Brazilian Roman Catholic prelate, bishop of Tubarão (1981–1992), Coxim (1992–1999), and Joaçaba (1999–2003).
- Kelsey Begaye, 70, American politician, president of the Navajo Nation (1999–2003).
- Franck Berrier, 37, French football player (Cannes, Zulte Waregem, Oostende) and manager, heart attack.
- Andrzej Borodzik, 91, Polish politician, chemist and scout leader, deputy (1965–1972), president of ZHP (2005–2007).
- Paula Bradley, 96, American politician, member of the New Hampshire House of Representatives (2014–2016).
- Peter Cavanaugh, 79, American radio DJ.
- Enzo Facciolo, 89, Italian comic book artist (Diabolik).
- Georg Gallus, 94, German politician, MP (1970–1994).
- Ernest Gondzik, 90, Polish Olympic wrestler (1952, 1960).
- Nanci Griffith, 68, American singer-songwriter ("Love at the Five and Dime", "Outbound Plane"), Grammy winner (1994).
- Egon Guttman, 94, German-born American law professor.
- Alejandro Guzmán Brito, 76, Chilean lawyer and historian, COVID-19.
- Stanley S. Harris, 93, American jurist, judge of the U.S. District Court for the District of Columbia (1983–2001) and the District of Columbia Court of Appeals (1972–1982).
- James Hormel, 88, American philanthropist, LGBT activist and diplomat, ambassador to Luxembourg (1999–2001).
- Henryk Hoser, 78, Polish Roman Catholic prelate, archbishop of Warszawa-Praga (2008–2017), COVID-19.
- Ahmed Joda, 91, Nigerian government administrator.
- Charlie Johnson, 69, American football player (Philadelphia Eagles, Minnesota Vikings).
- Leon Kopelman, 97, Polish-Israeli, last known surviving fighter of the Warsaw Ghetto Uprising.
- Mangkunegara IX, 69, Indonesian royal, Duke of Mangkunegaran (since 1987).
- Vladimir Mendelssohn, 71, Romanian composer and violist.
- Angela Milner, 73, British paleontologist.
- Rich Milot, 64, American football player (Washington Redskins), Super Bowl champion (1982, 1987).
- Marek Minda, 71, Polish doctor and politician, senator (1993–1997).
- Rhys Morgan, 67, Welsh rugby union player (national team).
- Kaycee Moore, 77, American actress (Killer of Sheep, Bless Their Little Hearts, Daughters of the Dust).
- Carmen Morales, 81, Argentine actress (Los caballeros de la cama redonda).
- Paul Palnik, 75, American cartoonist.
- Keitumetse Paul, 48, Botswana football player.
- Sir Michael Peckham, 86, British oncologist and artist.
- Steve Perrin, 75, American game designer (RuneQuest), technical writer and editor.
- Jean-Pierre Pichard, 75, French musician and academic.
- Pil Trafa, 62, Argentine singer and composer (Los Violadores).
- Carolyn S. Shoemaker, 92, American astronomer, co-discoverer of Comet Shoemaker–Levy 9, complications from a fall.
- Gino Strada, 73, Italian human rights activist and war surgeon, founder of Emergency, heart attack.
- Bobby Stein, 82, Scottish footballer (Raith Rovers, Montrose).
- Andrew Turton, 83, English anthropologist.
- Dante C. Youla, 95, American engineer and control theorist.

=== 14 ===
- Mian Bashir Ahmed, 97, Indian Islamic scholar and religious leader, four-time Jammu and Kashmir MLA.
- Michael Aung-Thwin, 74, Burmese-born American historian.
- Boonruen Choonhavan, 101, Thai socialite, spouse of the prime minister (1988–1991), COVID-19.
- Carlos Correia, 87, Bissau-Guinean politician, prime minister (1991–1994, 1997–1998, 2008–2009, 2015–2016).
- Piera Degli Esposti, 83, Italian actress (A Joke of Destiny, Sweet Dreams, Il divo), heart failure.
- Gabriel Fortuné, Haitian politician, mayor of Les Cayes (since 2016), earthquake.
- Jacques Fournier, 92, French government official, president of SNCF (1988–1993).
- William T. Frankenberger, 69, American soil scientist.
- Jerry Fujio, 81, Japanese singer and actor (Yojimbo, Ereki no Wakadaishō, The Stingiest Man in Town), COPD.
- Mary Yasuko Fujishima, 93, Japanese businessperson, honorary chairperson and former vice president of Johnny & Associates, pneumonia.
- Robin Hahn, 88, Canadian Olympic equestrian (1968, 1972, 1976).
- Matt Hoyt, 45, American music video director.
- Sol Kimel, 92, Israeli chemical physicist.
- Ibrahim Kalil Konaté, 44, Guinean politician, minister of national education and literacy (2017–2018), COVID-19.
- Buckie Leach, 62, American fencer and coach, motorcycle accident.
- Brigitte Maillard, 66, French writer and singer.
- Miguel Martorell, 83, Spanish Olympic cyclist.
- James McCartan Snr, 82–83, Irish Gaelic footballer.
- Virginia Moreno, 98, Filipino writer.
- Francis Mossman, 33, New Zealand actor (Ruben Guthrie).
- Igor Oistrakh, 90, Ukrainian violinist and teacher (Moscow Conservatory)
- Jackie Pancari, 60, American glass artist.
- Enrique Pérez Parrilla, 73, Spanish politician, president of Cabildo de Lanzarote (1983–1987, 1994–1995, 1996–2003) and mayor of Arrecife (2007–2009), heart attack.
- Algirdas Pocius, 90, Lithuanian politician, deputy (1992–1996).
- Dako Radošević, 86, Bosnian Olympic discus thrower (1956, 1964).
- R. Murray Schafer, 88, Canadian composer and writer, complications from Alzheimer's disease.
- Mickey Stephens, 77, American politician, member of the Georgia House of Representatives (since 2009).
- Fez Whatley, 57, American comedian and radio host (Ron and Fez), heart failure.
- Hugh Wood, 89, British composer.

=== 15 ===
- Usmankhan Alimov, 71, Uzbek Islamic cleric, chief mufti (since 2006).
- Arthur J. Ammann, 85, American immunologist.
- Ruth Apilado, 113, American newspaper editor and civil rights activist, founder of America's Intercultural Magazine.
- Philip James Ayres, 77, Australian literary historian.
- Jan Knippers Black, 81, American academic.
- Abdelhamid Brahimi, 85, Algerian politician, prime minister (1984–1988).
- Lester Coleman, 77, American author (Trail of the Octopus).
- Alfredo Cornejo, 88, Chilean Olympic boxer.
- Gianfranco D'Angelo, 84, Italian actor (La liceale, La compagna di banco) and comedian (Drive In).
- James DeMile, 86, American martial artist.
- Ann Lawrence Durviaux, 53, Belgian jurist and professor, shot.
- Roque Ferriols, 96, Filipino Jesuit priest and philosopher.
- Paulette Goodman, 88, French-born American LGBT activist, president of PFLAG (1988–1992).
- Francesco Gullino, 76, Italian-born Danish murder suspect, agent of the Bulgarian State Intelligence Agency.
- Frankie Hargis, 56, American Cherokee politician.
- Alena Hatvani, 46, Czech bodybuilder. (death announced on this date)
- Hiro, 90, Japanese-born American commercial photographer.
- Karen Fort Hood, 68, American jurist, judge of the Michigan Court of Appeals (since 2003).
- Claude Hudelot, 79, French sinologist and radio producer.
- Jagjit Kaur, 91, Indian playback singer (Shagoon).
- Evelyn Lavu, Papua New Guinean pathologist. (death announced on this date)
- Nathalie Maillet, 51, French architect and racecar driver, shot.
- Paul Mitchell, 64, American businessman and politician, member of the U.S. House of Representatives (2017–2021), kidney cancer.
- Giuseppe Montalbano, 96, Italian politician, mayor of Sambuca di Sicilia (1964–1980) and senator (1979–1987).
- Gerd Müller, 75, German footballer (1861 Nördlingen, Bayern Munich, West Germany national team), world champion (1974), complications from Alzheimer's disease.
- Abdur Rahim, 68, Bangladeshi military officer, director general of National Security Intelligence (2001–2005), COVID-19.
- Rafael Romero, 83, Venezuelan Olympic sprinter (1956, 1960, 1964).
- Mike Rose, 77, American education scholar.
- Greg Rowlands, 73, New Zealand rugby union player (Bay of Plenty, national team).
- Dick Schafrath, 84, American football player (Cleveland Browns) and politician, member of the Ohio Senate (1987–2000).
- Ernie Sigley, 82, Australian radio and television presenter (Sunnyside Up, Adelaide Tonight, Wheel of Fortune) and singer, complications from Alzheimer's disease.
- Jan David Simon, 3rd Viscount Simon, 81, British hereditary peer, member of the House of Lords (since 1994).
- Joe Walton, 85, American football player (Washington Redskins, New York Giants) and coach (New York Jets).
- Gary Woollard, 79, New Zealand rugby league player (Wellington, Auckland, national team).

=== 16 ===
- Stanley Aronowitz, 88, American sociologist, author, and political activist.
- Fernando Curiel, 79, Mexican writer, lawyer, and academic. (death announced on this date)
- Donald G. Dunn, 98, American World War II veteran, Silver Star recipient.
- Hormoz Farhat, 93, Iranian-American composer and ethnomusicologist.
- William R. Haine, 77, American politician, member of the Illinois Senate (2002–2019).
- Volodymyr Holubnychy, 85, Ukrainian race walker, Olympic champion (1960, 1968).
- Carlos Iturralde Ballivián, 80, Bolivian diplomat and politician, ambassador to the United States (1978–1979) and foreign minister (1989–1992).
- Oswaldo Johnston, 91, Guatemalan Olympic wrestler (1952).
- Anandha Kannan, 48, Singaporean actor (Adhisaya Ulagam) and television host, cancer.
- Inger Koedt, 106, Danish resistance movement rescuer.
- Sean Lock, 58, English comedian (15 Storeys High, 8 Out of 10 Cats, 8 Out of 10 Cats Does Countdown), lung cancer.
- Timothy McDarrah, 59, American journalist, gossip columnist, and art gallery owner, leukemia.
- Duda Mendonça, 77, Brazilian propagandist and political strategist.
- Abdullah Mokoginta, 86, Indonesian politician, MP (1992–1999).
- Paul Muegge, 84, American politician, member of the Oklahoma Senate (1990–2002).
- Bill Nelson, 76, American sound engineer (Heartbreak Ridge, Lethal Weapon, Elvira: Mistress of the Dark).
- Adedayo Omolafe, 57, Nigerian politician, member of the House of Representatives.
- John Pease, 77, American football player and coach (Utah Utes, New Orleans Saints, Jacksonville Jaguars).
- Bishwaishwar Ramsaroop, 81, Guyanese politician, vice president (1980–1984).
- Yvonne Pope Sintes, 90, South African-born British aviator, pneumonia.
- Omrane Sadok, 83, Tunisian Olympic boxer (1960).
- Hiroshi Sakagami, 85, Japanese author, cancer.
- Simão Sessim, 85, Brazilian lawyer and politician, deputy (1979–2019), COVID-19.
- Lucille Times, 100, American civil rights activist, COVID-19.
- Maurice Watkins, 79, British sports administrator and solicitor (Manchester United), prostate cancer.
- Marilynn Webb, 83, New Zealand artist.
- Stephen Young, 76, Scottish economist and scholar.

=== 17 ===
- Olav Akselsen, 55, Norwegian politician, MP (1989–2009) and minister of petroleum and energy (2000–2001).
- Sheila Bromberg, 92, British harpist.
- David W. J. Brown, 79, English cricketer (Gloucestershire).
- Joe Chasteen, 96, American politician, member of the Wyoming House of Representatives (1973–1977).
- Rock Demers, 87, Canadian film producer (The Dog Who Stopped the War, The Peanut Butter Solution, Vincent and Me), heart failure.
- Yvon Duhamel, 81, Canadian motorcycle racer.
- Ian Gardiner, 92, British actor (Reginald Molehusband).
- Guo Jingkun, 87, Chinese scientist, member of the Chinese Academy of Sciences.
- Ágnes Hankiss, 71, Hungarian politician, MEP (2009–2014).
- Gary Hirsh, 81, American drummer (Country Joe and the Fish).
- Bert Holcroft, 96, British rugby league player and coach (Eastern Suburbs).
- Anwar Hossain, 83, Bangladeshi entrepreneur, industrialist and politician, MP (1988–1990).
- Kazenambo Kazenambo, 58, Namibian politician, MP (2004–2014), complications from COVID-19.
- Nikolai Kuimov, 63, Russian test pilot, Hero of the Russian Federation (2006), air crash.
- Jack Lamb, 85, Canadian football player (Edmonton Eskimos, Calgary Stampeders).
- Tom Larkin, 103, New Zealand public servant and diplomat, ambassador to Japan (1972–1976).
- Chong-Sik Lee, 90, North Korean-born American political scientist.
- Thierry Liagre, 70, French actor (The Cabbage Soup, Les Visiteurs, Crimson Rivers II: Angels of the Apocalypse).
- Ibrahim Mantu, 74, Nigerian politician, member (1999–2007) and deputy president of the Senate, complications from COVID-19.
- Basil Mramba, 81, Tanzanian politician, minister of finance (2001–2005), complications from COVID-19.
- Eddie Paskey, 81, American actor (Star Trek).
- Paulão, 51, Angolan footballer (Benfica, Espinho, national team).
- Rodrigo Paz Delgado, 87, Ecuadorian politician, mayor of Quito (1988–1992).
- René Quéré, 89, French painter and ceramist.
- Adnan Abu Walid al-Sahrawi, 48, Moroccan Islamic militant, leader of the Islamic State in the Greater Sahara (since 2015), shot.
- Saul Soliz, 55, American mixed martial arts trainer, COVID-19.
- John Studd, 81, British gynaecologist.
- Fereshteh Taerpour, 68, Iranian film producer, COVID-19.
- Leonard Thompson, 69, American football player (Detroit Lions).
- Maurice Vandeweyer, 76, Belgian writer and mathematician.

=== 18 ===
- José Abueva, 93, Filipino political scientist, president of the University of the Philippines (1987–1993) and chancellor of UP Diliman (1990–1991).
- Abdul Hamid AbuSulayman, 84, Saudi Islamic scholar and educationist, rector of the IIUM (1989–1999).
- Muhammad Alim, 76, Indonesian jurist, judge of the Constitutional Court (2008–2015).
- Franz Josef Altenburg, 80, Austrian ceramicist and sculptor.
- Vincenzo Bruno, 88, Italian Olympic rower (1960).
- Ron Cornelius, 76, American musician and record producer, complications from a stroke.
- Guy de Rougemont, 86, French painter and sculptor.
- Solly Drake, 90, American baseball player (Chicago Cubs, Los Angeles Dodgers, Philadelphia Phillies).
- Joseph L. Galloway, 79, American newspaper correspondent and columnist.
- Pablo P. Garcia, 95, Filipino politician, congressman (1987–1995, 2007–2013) and governor of Cebu (1995–2004).
- József Gerlach, 82, Hungarian Olympic diver.
- Bojan Globočnik, 59, Slovenian Olympic ski jumper (1984).
- B. Wayne Hughes, 87, American businessman, founder of Public Storage.
- Gerry Jones, 75, English footballer (Stoke City, Macclesfield Town, Stafford Rangers).
- Alejandro Lamalfa, 74, Spanish politician, mayor of Barruelo de Santullán (1990–2007, 2011–2016) and senator (1996–2000).
- Austin Mitchell, 86, British politician, MP (1977–2015).
- Jill Murphy, 72, British author (The Worst Witch), cancer.
- Andrés Navarro, 83, Spanish Olympic boxer (1960).
- Didier Notheaux, 73, French football player (Rouen, Lens) and manager (Burkina Faso national team).
- Eric Poole, 79, Australian politician, Northern Territory MLA (1986–2001).
- Robert Smith, 85, American sport executive and administrator, president of the International Baseball Federation (1981–1993).
- Frank Soos, 70, American writer, bicycle accident.
- Evgeny Sveshnikov, 71, Russian chess player and writer, complications from COVID-19.
- Tomiyama Taeko, 99, Japanese visual artist.
- Temur Tugushi, 49, Georgian footballer (Dinamo Batumi, Dinamo Tbilisi, national team), COVID-19.
- Kaari Upson, 51, American artist, breast cancer.
- Stephen Vizinczey, 88, Hungarian-Canadian author and writer.
- E. J. Williams, 103, Canadian politician, Manitoba MLA (1958–1959).
- Max Willis, 85, Australian politician, member (1970–1999) and president (1991–1998) of the New South Wales Legislative Council.
- Legacy World, 32, Japanese thoroughbred racehorse.
- American hikers shot in a double homicide: (bodies discovered on this date)
  - Kylen Schulte, 24
  - Crystal Turner, 38

=== 19 ===
- Junaid Babunagari, 67, Bangladeshi Islamic scholar and writer, amir of Hefazat-e-Islam Bangladesh (since 2020), stroke.
- Gary Bouma, 79, American-born Australian sociologist and Anglican priest.
- Trygve Brudevold, 100, Norwegian Olympic bobsledder (1952, 1956).
- Carlo Cataldo, 88, Italian historian, poet, and teacher.
- Raoul Cauvin, 82, Belgian comics writer (Les Tuniques Bleues, Agent 212, Les Femmes en Blanc).
- Sonny Chiba, 82, Japanese actor (The Street Fighter, The Storm Riders, Kill Bill: Volume 1) and martial artist, complications from COVID-19.
- Chuck Close, 81, American photorealist painter, heart failure.
- William Clotworthy, 95, American television censor (Saturday Night Live) and writer.
- Robert Cogan, 91, American music theorist and composer.
- Arturo Cucciolla, 73, Italian architect.
- Sir Michael Cullen, 76, New Zealand politician, MP (1981–2009), minister of finance (1999–2008), and deputy prime minister (2002–2008), lung cancer.
- Bill Freehan, 79, American baseball player (Detroit Tigers) and coach (Michigan Wolverines), World Series champion (1968), complications from Alzheimer's disease.
- Rod Gilbert, 80, Canadian Hall of Fame ice hockey player (New York Rangers).
- Iohan Gueorguiev, 33, Bulgarian-born Canadian long-distance bikepacker, suicide.
- Sir Peter Harding, 87, British air force officer, chief of the Air Staff (1988–1992) and Defence Staff (1992–1994).
- Július Holeš, 82, Slovak Olympic footballer (1968).
- Olivia Jordan, 102, British World War II ambulance driver and interpreter.
- Genevieve M. Knight, 82, American mathematician and educator, stroke.
- Percha Leanpuri, 35, Indonesian politician, MP (since 2019), complications from childbirth.
- Li Hsing, 91, Taiwanese film director (Beautiful Duckling, Execution in Autumn, The Heroic Pioneers), heart failure.
- James W. Loewen, 79, American sociologist, historian, and author.
- O. M. Nambiar, 89, Indian athletics coach (P. T. Usha).
- Enrique Sánchez Carrasco, 93, Spanish politician, mayor of Huesca (1987–1995).
- Sandro Hit, 28, German dressage horse and sire, infection.
- B. Senguttuvan, 65, Indian politician, MP (2014–2019).
- Bill Sidwell, 101, Australian tennis player.
- Robert D. Springer, 88, American lieutenant general.
- Ramo Stott, 87, American racing driver, cancer.
- Sergio Vuskovic, 90, Chilean politician, mayor of Valparaíso (1970–1973).
- Keith Webb, 88, Australian footballer (Fitzroy).
- Martin Wiggemansen, 64, Dutch footballer (Ajax, Lugano, PEC Zwolle).
- Peter Williams, 69, American painter, heart attack.
- Jean Yokum, 90, American financial executive.

=== 20 ===
- Annegret Bollée, 84, German linguist.
- Emilio Carrara, 75, Argentine politician, vice governor of Chaco Province (1987–1991).
- Ian Carey, 45, American DJ and record producer.
- Nino D'Agata, 65, Italian actor (The Consequences of Love, Giovanni Falcone, RIS Delitti Imperfetti) and voice actor.
- Tom T. Hall, 85, American Hall of Fame singer-songwriter ("Harper Valley PTA", "I Love", "The Year That Clayton Delaney Died"), suicide by gunshot.
- Mark Hamister, 69, American arena football executive, owner of the Buffalo Destroyers (1999–2003) and Rochester Brigade (2001–2003), COVID-19.
- Larry Harlow, 82, American salsa musician and composer, kidney disease.
- Peter Ind, 93, British jazz double bassist and record producer.
- Michael Morgan, 63, American conductor, complications from infection following kidney transplant.
- Spain Musgrove, 76, American football player (Washington Redskins, Houston Oilers).
- Stephen B. Oates, 85, American professor and historian, cancer.
- David Roberts, 78, American rock climber and author, complications from throat cancer.
- Lester Salamon, 78, American political scientist.
- Paolo Saviane, 59, Italian politician, senator (since 2018), complications from heart surgery.
- Gaia Servadio, 82, Italian writer.
- Michel Steiner, 74, French writer and psychoanalyst.
- Robert B. Tanguy, 94, American Air Force major general, commandant of the Armed Forces Staff College (1980–1981).
- Sally Tanner, 94, American politician, member of the California State Assembly (1978–1992).
- Igor Vovkovinskiy, 38, Ukrainian-born American law student and actor.
- Rebecca Wasserman-Hone, 84, American-French wine expert, chronic obstructive pulmonary disease.
- Brent Yonts, 72, American politician, member of the Kentucky House of Representatives (1997–2016), COVID-19.

=== 21 ===
- Ernest Aljančič Jr., 76, Slovenian ice hockey player (Yugoslavia national team).
- Jarvis Astaire, 97, British boxing promoter and film producer (Agatha).
- Clifford Barry, 75, Canadian Olympic water polo player (1972, 1976).
- Chithra, 56, Indian actress (Manya Mahajanangale, Katha Ithuvare, Panchagni), cardiac arrest.
- Budi Darma, 84, Indonesian writer and academic.
- Nickolas Davatzes, 79, American television executive, founder of A&E Networks.
- Rudolf Edlinger, 81, Austrian politician and football executive, minister of finance (1997–2000) and president of SK Rapid Wien (2001–2013).
- Bill Emerson, 83, American five-string banjo player (The Country Gentlemen).
- Don Everly, 84, American Hall of Fame singer (The Everly Brothers) and songwriter ("Cathy's Clown", "So Sad (To Watch Good Love Go Bad)").
- Boutros Gemayel, 89, Lebanese Maronite Catholic prelate, archeparch of Cyprus (1988–2008).
- Micki Grant, 92, American playwright (Your Arms Too Short to Box with God, Working) and actress (Another World).
- Joe Grech, 66, Maltese snooker player.
- Connie Hamzy, 66, American groupie.
- Eddie Healey, 83, British businessman.
- Reino Hiltunen, 96, Finnish Olympic triple jumper (1952).
- Volodymyr Ivanov, 85, Belarusian Olympic boxer.
- Karolina Kaczorowska, 90, Polish academic, first lady in exile (1989–1990).
- Gabriel Kyungu, 82, Congolese politician, governor of Katanga (1991–1995, 1997), COVID-19.
- Paul Lokech, 55, Ugandan military officer, deputy inspector general of the National Police (since 2020), blood clot.
- Marie, Princess of Liechtenstein, 81, Liechtensteiner royal, princess consort (since 1989), stroke.
- Thad McClammy, 78, American politician, member of the Alabama House of Representatives (since 1994).
- Larry Naviaux, 84, American football player and coach (Boston University Terriers).
- Masanari Nihei, 80, Japanese actor (Ultraman), aspiration pneumonia.
- Andreas Norland, 86, Norwegian newspaper editor (Aftenposten, Verdens Gang, Adresseavisen).
- Tunji Olurin, 76, Nigerian general, military governor of Oyo State (1985–1988).
- Jean Orchampt, 97, French Roman Catholic prelate, bishop of Angers (1974–2000).
- Nicoletta Orsomando, 92, Italian continuity announcer (Rai 1).
- Floyd Reese, 73, American football player (Montreal Alouettes), coach (Minnesota Vikings) and executive (Tennessee Titans), cancer.
- Jeanne Robertson, 77, American humorist, motivational speaker and pageant winner, Miss North Carolina (1963).
- William Ross, 93, American Olympic water polo player.
- Guy Sansaricq, 86, Haitian-born American Roman Catholic prelate, auxiliary bishop of Brooklyn (2006–2010).
- Andrzej Schinzel, 84, Polish mathematician (Davenport–Schinzel sequence, Schinzel's hypothesis H).
- Frank L. Schmidt, 77, American psychology professor (University of Iowa).
- Anthony Scotto, 87, American mobster (Gambino crime family).
- Olga Šicnerová, 93, Czech Olympic sprinter.
- Kalyan Singh, 89, Indian politician, chief minister of Uttar Pradesh (1991–1992, 1997–1999) and governor of Rajasthan (2014–2019), multiple organ failure.
- Arthur Smith, 106, English footballer (Bury, Leicester City).
- Chris Torrance, 80, British poet.
- Kostas Triantafyllopoulos, 65, Greek actor (Symmathites, Peninta Peninta, Kaneis de leei s' agapo) and voice actor.
- Phil Valentine, 61, American talk radio show host (WWTN), COVID-19.
- Nick Volpe, 95, Canadian football player (Toronto Argonauts).

=== 22 ===
- Sir Eric Ash, 93, German-born British electrical engineer.
- Mark Bailey, 70, Canadian diplomat.
- Danton Barto, 50, American football player, complications from COVID-19.
- Alberto Bica, 63, Uruguayan footballer (Club Atlético Unión, Racing Club de Montevideo, national team), leukemia.
- Álvaro Blancarte, 84, Mexican painter, sculptor and muralist.
- Juan Carlos Blanco Estradé, 87, Uruguayan lawyer, politician and convicted criminal, minister of foreign relations (1972–1976).
- William J. Boarman, 75, American printer, public printer of the U.S. (2010–2012).
- George Bournoutian, 77, Iranian-American historian.
- Charles Burles, 85, French tenor.
- Kay Bullitt, 96, American civil rights activist and philanthropist.
- Grange Calveley, 78, British writer (Roobarb, Noah and Nelly in... SkylArk) and artist, complications from a stroke.
- Vivian Caver, 93, American politician, member of the Washington House of Representatives (1994–1995).
- Lloyd Dobyns, 85, American news reporter (NBC News).
- Mo Drake, 93, British advertising executive.
- Pierre Dumay, 92, French racing driver.
- Marilyn Eastman, 87, American actress (Night of the Living Dead).
- Bob Fish, 72, British singer (Darts).
- Jean-Pierre Fragnière, 76, Swiss academic and political scientist.
- Syed Shahid Hakim, 82, Indian Olympic football player (1960), manager (Bengal Mumbai) and referee, cardiac arrest.
- Raymond Hamers, 88, Belgian immunologist.
- Bill Hansen, 90, American politician.
- Jack Hirschman, 87, American poet and social activist.
- Marcos Libedinsky, 88, Chilean judge, member (1993–2008) and president of the Supreme Court (2004–2006).
- Donna Merwick, 89, American-Australian historian.
- Prabodhkant Pandya, 77, Indian politician, Gujarat MLA (1985–1995, 2002–2007).
- Sheikh Shahidur Rahman, 70, Bangladeshi politician, MP (1986–1988), heart attack.
- Nelly Restar, 81, Filipino Olympic sprinter (1964).
- Edin Šaranović, 45, Bosnian football player (Sarajevo, Kamen Ingrad, national team) and manager, heart attack.
- Powell St. John, 80, American singer and songwriter (Mother Earth).
- Bill Taylor, 77, American visual effects artist (Blade Runner, The Thing, Batman Forever).
- Karl Traub, 80, German politician, member of the Landtag of Baden-Württemberg (1996–2016), heart attack.
- Eric Wagner, 62, American heavy metal singer (Trouble), COVID-19.
- Jane Wenham-Jones, 59, British writer and journalist (Woman's Weekly).
- Douglas R. White, 79, American anthropologist.
- John Wofford, 90, American equestrian, Olympic bronze medalist (1952).

=== 23 ===
- Victoria Aguiyi-Ironsi, 97, Nigerian socialite, first lady (1966), stroke.
- Peter Baumgartner, 82, Swiss cinematographer (Two Bavarians in Bonn, Jack the Ripper, Commando Leopard).
- Dame Elizabeth Blackadder, 89, Scottish painter.
- Raymond C. Bowen, 86, American biologist and academic administrator.
- Brick Bronsky, 57, American professional wrestler (Stampede) and actor (Sgt. Kabukiman N.Y.P.D., The Quest), COVID-19.
- Mamadouba Toto Camara, Guinean politician, minister of security and civil protection (2010–2014).
- Babita Deokaran, South African anti-corruption whistleblower, shot.
- Terry Driver, 56, Canadian convicted murderer, cancer.
- Daniel Farhi, 79, French rabbi.
- Tom Flynn, 66, American author, novelist, and editor (Free Inquiry), executive director of the Council for Secular Humanism.
- Michael Gage, 76, American politician, member of the California State Assembly (1976–1980).
- Robert Gerhart, 100, American politician, member of the Pennsylvania House of Representatives (1967–1968) and Senate (1969–1972).
- Yusuf Grillo, 86, Nigerian artist, complications from COVID-19.
- Jimmy Hayes, 31, American ice hockey player (Boston Bruins, Florida Panthers, Chicago Blackhawks), accidental drug overdose.
- Thomas McKenzie, 50, American author and Anglican priest.
- Michèle Minerva, 62, French pétanque player.
- Michael Nader, 76, American actor (Dynasty, All My Children, Lucky Chances), cancer.
- Jean-Luc Nancy, 81, French philosopher.
- Liam O'Brien, 72, Irish hurler (James Stephens).
- Giovanni Pretorius, 49, South African Olympic boxer (1992), COVID-19.
- Rosita Quintana, 96, Argentine-Mexican actress (Susana, The Price of Living, To the Four Winds) and singer, complications from thyroid surgery.
- W. S. Renn Jr., 93, American football coach.
- Gary Tricker, 82, New Zealand painter and printmaker, stroke.
- Miguel Ángel Vicco, 76, Argentine presidential private secretary, complications from intestinal surgery.
- Anestis Vlahos, 87, Greek actor (A Girl in Black, Young Aphrodites, The Man with the Carnation).
- Olli Wisdom, 63, English musician (Specimen).
- José Yudica, 85, Argentine football player (Boca Juniors, national team) and manager (Newell's Old Boys).

=== 24 ===
- Kyle Anderson, 33, Australian darts player, kidney failure.
- Ray Aspden, 83, English footballer (Rochdale).
- Volodymyr Bondarenko, 68, Ukrainian politician, MP (1996–2014) and head of the Kyiv City State Administration (2014).
- Alain Boudet, 71, French poet.
- Claude Bourrigault, 89, French footballer (Angers SCO, Stade Rennais F.C.).
- O. Chandrashekar, 85, Indian Olympic footballer (1960).
- Anatoliy Chizhov, 87, Russian engineer and politician, Soviet deputy (1989–1991).
- Bruce Culpan, 91, New Zealand rower.
- Robert Dauer, 68, Australian Olympic boxer.
- Ivan Dorovský, 86, Czech Slavist and Balkanologist.
- Olabiyi Durojaiye, 88, Nigerian politician, senator (1999–2003), COVID-19.
- Pierre Dutot, 75, French trumpeter and professor.
- Dale Derby, 72, American politician, member of the Oklahoma House of Representatives (2017–2019), drowned.
- Léopold K. Fakambi, 78, Beninese agronomist and engineer.
- Nicholas Felice, 94, American politician, mayor of Fair Lawn, New Jersey (1972–1974) and member of the New Jersey General Assembly (1982–2002).
- P. J. Garvey, 50, Irish hurler (Hospital-Herbertstown) and Gaelic footballer (Limerick).
- Óscar Giraldo, 48, Colombian Olympic cyclist (1996).
- Hissène Habré, 79, Chadian politician and convicted war criminal, prime minister (1978–1979) and president (1982–1990), COVID-19.
- Jerry Harkness, 81, American basketball player (Indiana Pacers, New York Knicks), NCAA champion (1963).
- Elia Hernández Núñez, 59, Mexican politician, deputy (2006–2009).
- Stuart Housley, 72, English footballer (Yeovil Town, Grimsby Town, Weymouth).
- Harry Kent, 74, New Zealand Olympic cyclist (1972).
- Olga Lipovskaya, 67, Russian journalist and feminist.
- Calogero Lo Giudice, 83, Italian politician, president of Sicily (1982–1983).
- Michel Marot, 95, French architect.
- Yasuko Matsuda, 84, Japanese Olympic shot putter (1960).
- Fritz McIntyre, 62, English keyboardist (Simply Red).
- Mohd Ghazali Mohd Seth, 92, Malaysian military officer, chief of army (1977–1982) and defence forces (1982–1985).
- Nadir Nadirov, 89, Kazakh engineer.
- Norman Pender, 73, Scottish rugby union player (South of Scotland, national team), heart attack.
- Mario Pennacchia, 93, Italian journalist and writer.
- Wynn Roberts, 97, Australian actor (Prisoner, Consider Your Verdict, Picnic at Hanging Rock).
- Mangala Samaraweera, 65, Sri Lankan politician, MP (1989–2020) and minister of foreign affairs (2005–2007, 2015–2017), COVID-19.
- Roy V. Scott, 93, American historian.
- John Sheridan, 75, American jazz pianist and arranger, cancer.
- Jan Suchý, 76, Czech ice hockey player (HC Dukla Jihlava), Olympic silver medalist (1968).
- Wilfried Van Moer, 76, Belgian footballer (Standard Liège, national team), stroke.
- George S. Vest, 102, American diplomat, ambassador to the European Union (1981–1985).
- Charlie Watts, 80, English Hall of Fame drummer (The Rolling Stones, Blues Incorporated).

=== 25 ===
- Mohsin Ahmad al-Aini, 88, Yemeni politician, prime minister (1967, 1969, 1970–1971, 1971–1972, 1974–1975).
- Gerry Ashmore, 85, English motor racing driver, cancer.
- Subhankar Banerjee, 55, Indian tabla player, complications from COVID-19.
- Gunilla Bergström, 79, Swedish children's book writer and illustrator (Alfie Atkins).
- Ethel Brez, 84, American television writer (Days of Our Lives, One Life to Live, Passions).
- Eduardo Brizuela del Moral, 77, Argentine politician, senator (2001–2003), governor of Catamarca Province (2003–2011), and deputy (since 2013), pneumonia.
- Antônio Câmara, 83, Brazilian politician, Rio Grande do Norte MLA (1966–1982), secretary-general of the Brazilian Democratic Movement (1982), and member of the Constituent Assembly (1988–1991).
- Metin Çekmez, 76, Turkish actor (Tatlı Dillim, The Shadow Play, Adını Feriha Koydum), cancer.
- Max Cryer, 85, New Zealand television host and author.
- Ted Dexter, 86, English cricketer (Sussex, national team).
- Paul Dukes, 87, British historian.
- Aldo Eminente, 90, French swimmer, Olympic bronze medallist (1952).
- Mario Gareña, 88, Colombian singer and composer.
- Leo Gately, 84, Australian politician, Queensland MLA (1986–1989).
- Gloria Ford Gilmer, 93, American mathematician.
- Manuel Guerra Gómez, 90, Spanish priest and sectologist.
- Mario Guilloti, 75, Argentine boxer, Olympic bronze medalist (1968).
- Milan Gutović, 75, Serbian actor (A Tight Spot, Bela lađa) and comedian, complications from COVID-19.
- Ileana Gyulai-Drîmbă-Jenei, 75, Romanian fencer, Olympic bronze medallist (1968, 1972).
- Said al-Harumi, 49, Israeli politician, member of the Knesset (since 2017), heart attack.
- Ida Keeling, 106, American centenarian track and field athlete.
- Robin Miller, 71, American motorsports journalist (The Indianapolis Star, Speed Channel, NBCSN), multiple myeloma and leukemia.
- Kazuhiro Morita, 69, Japanese composer, multiple myeloma.
- Jonathan Myles-Lea, 52, British painter, cancer.
- B. V. Nimbkar, 90, Indian agricultural scientist.
- Gail Omvedt, 80, American-born Indian sociologist and human rights activist.
- Zdenka Procházková, 95, Czech actress (A Dead Man Among the Living, Steam Above a Pot, May Events).
- Bobby Waddell, 81, Scottish footballer (Dundee, East Fife).
- Georgie Wolton, 87, British architect.
- Zheng Zhemin, 96, Chinese explosives engineer and physicist, member of the Chinese Academy of Sciences and Chinese Academy of Engineering.
- Susana Zimmermann, 88, Argentine dancer and choreographer.

=== 26 ===
- Rodolfo Aínsa, 76, Spanish politician and businessman, president of the Province of Huesca (1995–1999) and senator (2004–2008).
- Neal Brendel, 66, American rugby union player (national team) and executive, chairman of USA Rugby (2002–2005), mesothelioma.
- Charles Chuka, 68, Malawian economist, governor of the Reserve Bank of Malawi (2012–2017).
- Franciszek Gąsior, 74, Polish Olympic handball player (1972).
- Marco Hausiku, 67, Namibian politician, minister of foreign affairs (2004–2010).
- Rafael Hechanova, 93, Filipino Olympic basketball player (1952).
- Qazi Massarrat Hussain, 86, Pakistani field hockey player, Olympic silver medalist (1956).
- JB Tuhure, 78, Nepali singer and politician, MP (2014–2017).
- Walter Lüchinger, 95, Swiss Olympic rower.
- Kenny Malone, 83, American drummer, COVID-19.
- Wataru Mimura, 67, Japanese screenwriter (Godzilla), multiple system atrophy.
- Barbara Moore, 89, English composer.
- Hans Müller, 90, Swiss Olympic figure skater (1956).
- Victor Olaotan, 69, Nigerian actor (Tinsel, Three Wise Men), complications from a traffic collision.
- Taffy Owen, 85, Welsh speedway rider.
- Jérôme Proulx, 91, Canadian politician, Quebec MNA (1966–1970, 1976–1985).
- Aleś Razanaŭ, 73, Belarusian poet and translator.
- Sompote Sands, 80, Thai film director (Hanuman and the Five Riders, Crocodile, Magic Lizard), cancer.
- Vladimir Shadrin, 73, Russian ice hockey player (HC Spartak Moscow, Oji Eagles) and coach, Olympic champion (1972, 1976), COVID-19.
- Jerry Thompson, 98, American Olympic distance runner (1948).
- French Tickner, 91, American-Canadian voice actor (Death Note, Inuyasha, Madeline).
- Stanley A. Weiss, 94, American mining executive and writer, founder of Business Executives for National Security.
- Dale Willis, 83, American baseball player (Kansas City Athletics).

=== 27 ===
- Stjepan Babić, 95, Croatian linguist, MP (1993–1997).
- Priscilla Baltazar-Padilla, 63, Filipino jurist, associate justice of the Supreme Court (2020).
- Jim Bartlett, 89, Canadian ice hockey player (New York Rangers, Boston Bruins, Montreal Canadiens).
- Jean-Pierre Bastiani, 71, French politician, mayor of Auterive (1989–2008, 2014–2018) and deputy (1993–1997).
- Noor Islam Dawar, Pakistani activist, shot.
- Edmond H. Fischer, 101, American biochemist, Nobel Prize laureate (1992).
- Beniamino Giribaldi, 79, Italian organ builder.
- Mizanul Haque, 76, Bangladeshi politician, MP (1991–2001).
- Anne Jolliffe, 87, Australian animator (Yellow Submarine).
- Babette Josephs, 81, American politician, member of the Pennsylvania House of Representatives (1985–2012), cancer.
- Hae Un Lee, 79, South Korean-born American businessman, founder of Lee's Discount Liquor.
- Hermann Kinder, 77, German writer.
- Gaston Malam, 69, Cameroonian Olympic sprinter.
- Siegfried Matthus, 87, German composer (Judith) and opera festival director (Kammeroper Schloss Rheinsberg).
- N. V. Nambiathiri, 89, Indian Sanskrit scholar and educator. (death announced on this date)
- Peter McNamee, 86, Scottish footballer (Peterborough United, Notts County).
- Daasebre Oti Boateng, 83, Ghanaian academic and traditional ruler, omanhene of New Juaben (since 1992). (death announced on this date)
- Fred Rexer, 74, American screenwriter (Extreme Prejudice).
- Rubina Saigol, Pakistani feminist scholar and women's rights activist.
- Sam Salter, 46, American R&B singer.
- L. Neil Smith, 75, American science fiction author (The Lando Calrissian Adventures).
- Nenad Trinajstić, 84, Croatian chemist.
- Akis Tsochatzopoulos, 82, Greek politician and convicted criminal, MP (1981–2007), minister of the interior (1987–1989, 1993–1995) and national defence (1996–2001).
- Joan Whalley, 93, Australian actress.
- Lucille Whipper, 93, American politician, member of the South Carolina House of Representatives (1985–1995).
- Johnny Williamson, 92, English footballer (Manchester City, Blackburn Rovers).
- Peter Zimmerman, 80, American nuclear physicist and arms control expert.

=== 28 ===
- Nasrul Abit, 66, Indonesian politician, vice governor of West Sumatra (2016–2021), COVID-19.
- Joan Almond, 86, American photographer.
- John Anton, 94, English cricketer (Cambridge University, Worcestershire).
- Alioune Badara Cissé, 63, Senegalese lawyer and politician, foreign minister (2012), COVID-19.
- Pierre Bourque, 62, Canadian race car driver, journalist and politician, member of the Ottawa City Council (1991), heart attack.
- Francesc Burrull, 86, Spanish jazz musician and composer.
- Bulbul Chowdhury, 74, Bangladeshi writer, cancer.
- Noel Cringle, 83, Manx politician, president of Tynwald (2000–2011).
- Pablo Dabezies, 81, Uruguayan priest and theologian.
- Jacques Drouin, 78, Canadian animator and director (Mindscape).
- John van Dyke, 85, American Olympic sprint canoer.
- Joye Evans, 92, New Zealand Girl Guides leader.
- Bob Fisher, 92, Australian footballer (Hawthorn).
- Giraldo González, 63, Cuban baseball player, COVID-19.
- Roman Gromadskiy, 80, Russian actor (King Lear, A Lover's Romance, The Circus Burned Down, and the Clowns Have Gone).
- Ahmad Sarji Abdul Hamid, 82, Malaysian civil servant, chief secretary to the government (1990–1996), COVID-19.
- Jiang Chunyun, 91, Chinese politician, governor of Shandong (1987–1988) and vice premier (1995–1998).
- Jin Renqing, 77, Chinese politician, director of the State Taxation Administration (1998–2003) and minister of finance (2003–2007), house fire.
- Dimitri Kitsikis, 86, Greek academic.
- Sam Oji, 35, English footballer (Tamworth, Limerick, Hednesford Town).
- Victor Uwaifo, 80, Nigerian musician.
- Teresa Żylis-Gara, 91, Polish operatic soprano (Metropolitan Opera).

=== 29 ===
- Ed Asner, 91, American actor (The Mary Tyler Moore Show, Lou Grant, Up), president of the Screen Actors Guild (1981–1985), seven-time Emmy winner.
- Barthélémy Attisso, 76, Togolese lawyer and guitarist (Orchestra Baobab), COVID-19.
- Kolë Berisha, 73, Kosovar politician, chairman of the Assembly (2006–2007).
- Ron Bushy, 79, American drummer (Iron Butterfly), esophageal cancer.
- Sione Vuna Faʻotusia, 68, Tongan politician, deputy (since 2014), minister for justice and prisons (2014–2019), and deputy prime minister (2019–2020).
- Peggy Farrell, 89, American costume designer (Dog Day Afternoon, Holocaust, The Stepford Wives), Emmy winner (1978).
- Fran Frisch, 73, American cartoonist, prostate cancer.
- Alex Gallacher, 67, Scottish-born Australian politician, senator (since 2011), lung cancer.
- Buddhadeb Guha, 85, Indian writer, complications from COVID-19.
- Tudor Gunasekara, 86, Sri Lankan politician and diplomat, MP (1977–1983), COVID-19.
- Muhammad Hamza, 92, Pakistani politician, deputy (1985–1988, 1990–1999) and senator (2012–2018), complications from COVID-19.
- Robert L. James, 84, American businessman.
- John A. Kaneb, 86, American businessman, CEO of HP Hood, part-owner of the Boston Red Sox, complications from heart surgery.
- Joe McInnes, 88, Scottish footballer (Kilmarnock, Partick Thistle, Stirling Albion).
- Manuel Monerris, 75, Spanish politician, mayor of Ferreries (2011–2015) and member of the Parliament of the Balearic Islands (2011–2015).
- Mikhail Nenashev, 61, Russian politician, deputy (2007–2011), cardiac arrest.
- Pat Nolan, 84, Irish hurler (Wexford).
- Lee "Scratch" Perry, 85, Jamaican reggae musician (The Upsetters), songwriter ("Run for Cover", "Police and Thieves") and record producer.
- Yuri Pudyshev, 67, Belarusian football player (Dinamo Minsk, Dynamo Yakutsk, Soviet Union national team) and manager.
- Rodney Rice, 76, Irish journalist and broadcaster.
- Jacques Rogge, 79, Belgian Olympic sailor (1968, 1972, 1976) and sports administrator, president of the IOC (2001–2013).
- Valer Săsărman, 52, Romanian football player (Gloria Bistrița) and manager (FC Bistrița), stroke.
- Michael Simon, 73, American ceramic artist.
- Lajim Ukin, 66, Malaysian politician, MP (2008–2013) and Sabah MLA (2013–2018), COVID-19.
- Robert Wolke, 93, American chemist, complications from Alzheimer's disease.

=== 30 ===
- Sune Bergman, 68, Swedish ice hockey player (Troja-Ljungby) and coach (HV71, Frisk Asker).
- Anand Dev Bhatt, 84, Nepalese writer and politician, president of the Progressive Writers' Movement.
- José María Libório Camino Saracho, 89, Spanish Roman Catholic prelate, bishop of Presidente Prudente (2002–2008) and Urusi (1999–2002) and auxiliary bishop of São Miguel Paulista (1999–2002).
- Junior Coffey, 79, American football player (Green Bay Packers, Atlanta Falcons, New York Giants), heart failure.
- Nelson Cowles, 90, American politician, member of the Texas House of Representatives (1961–1967).
- Bjarne Fiskum, 82, Norwegian violinist, conductor, and pedagogue.
- Jean-Louis Fiszman, 60–61, French caricaturist and comic book author.
- Claude Guichard, 92, French politician, deputy (1967–1968, 1968–1972).
- Marcel Henry, 94, French politician, senator (1977–2004).
- Mischa Hausserman, 79, Austrian-born American actor (Die Hard with a Vengeance, The Thomas Crown Affair, The 13th Warrior).
- Latif Nassif Jassim, 80, Iraqi politician and convicted murderer, minister of agriculture (1977–1979).
- Linda Kahn, 72, American television executive.
- Saleem Kidwai, 70, Indian historian and LGBT rights activist, cardiac arrest.
- Ray Kinasewich, 87, Canadian ice hockey player (Hershey Bears) and coach (Edmonton Oilers).
- Benjamin Woods Labaree, 94, American historian.
- Mal Z. Lawrence, 88, American comedian and actor (Rounders).
- Oliver Loftéen, 42, Swedish actor (Underground Secrets, Tic Tac, Vägen ut).
- Allen Lowrie, 72, Australian botanist.
- David Luscombe, 83, British historian.
- Maggie Mae, 61, German singer, COVID-19.
- Pat Maginnis, 93, American abortion-rights activist.
- Giuseppe Marchetti, 86, Italian literary critic and journalist.
- Seán McGuinness, 76, Irish hurling manager (Down GAA).
- Frank Moya, 92, American anesthesiologist.
- Messaoud Nedjahi, 67, Algerian writer and singer-songwriter, COVID-19.
- Vsevolod Ovchinnikov, 94, Russian journalist and writer-publicist.
- Brian Packer, 77, British Olympic boxer (1964).
- Vasoo Paranjape, 82, Indian cricketer (Mumbai, Baroda) and coach.
- Sakaran Dandai, 91, Malaysian politician, MP (1986–1995), chief minister (1994) and governor (1995–2002) of Sabah, COVID-19.
- Zurab Samadashvili, 66, Georgian writer and playwright, cirrhosis.
- Sadashiv Sathe, 95, Indian sculptor.
- Cecil Souders, 100, American football player (Detroit Lions).
- Robert David Steele, 69, American computer scientist and historian, COVID-19.
- Summerly, 19, American racehorse, colic. (death announced on this date)
- Vicki Trickett, 82, American actress (The Three Stooges Meet Hercules, The Tab Hunter Show, The Adventures of Ozzie and Harriet).
- Wang Kuang-hui, 56, Taiwanese baseball player (Brother Elephants) and coach, liver cancer.

=== 31 ===
- Tamilla Agamirova, 93, Russian actress (Don Quixote, Matteo Falcone).
- Léon Aimé, 97, French politician, deputy (1993–1997).
- Vasile Belous, 33, Moldovan Olympic boxer (2012), traffic collision.
- Sal Cenicola, 62, American boxer, restaurateur and actor.
- Michael Constantine, 94, American actor (My Big Fat Greek Wedding, Room 222, The Hustler), Emmy winner (1970).
- Robbie Dale, 81, British radio DJ.
- Sebastiano Dho, 86, Italian Roman Catholic prelate, bishop of Saluzzo (1986–1993) and Alba (1993–2010).
- Julie Ditty, 42, American tennis player, cancer.
- Geronimo, 8, New Zealand-born British alpaca.
- Joel Gustafson, 84, American politician.
- Bashir Al Helal, 85, Bangladeshi novelist.
- Anatoly Kavkayev, 72, Russian Greco-Roman wrestler, European champion (1974).
- Oleg Khlestov, 98, Russian diplomat and legal academic.
- Ivan R. King, 94, American astronomer.
- Přemysl Krbec, 81, Czech Olympic gymnast (1964).
- Mahal, 46, Filipino actress and comedian, COVID-19.
- Roman Malinowski, 86, Polish politician and economist, deputy, (1976–1989), deputy prime minister (1980–1985) and marshal of the Sejm (1985–1989).
- Kebby Maphatsoe, 58, South African politician, MP (since 2009).
- Les Martyn, 89, Australian sports administrator.
- Nobesuthu Mbadu, 76, South African mbaqanga singer (Mahotella Queens), kidney failure.
- Francesco Morini, 77, Italian footballer (Sampdoria, Juventus, national team).
- Francisco Monterrosa, 52, Mexican Zapotec visual artist, muralist, and engraver, COVID-19.
- Kazimieras Motieka, 91, Lithuanian politician and lawyer, member of the Supreme Soviet (1989–1990) and Supreme Council (1990–1992).
- Heru Nerly, 40, Indonesian footballer (Persipura Jayapura, national team).
- Goran Obradović, 34, Serbian footballer (Gandzasar, Mika, Lanexang United), suicide.
- K. P. Pillai, 91, Indian film director.
- Theresa Plummer-Andrews, 77, British television producer (Bob the Builder, The Animals of Farthing Wood, Little Robots).
- James D. Raisbeck, 84, American aeronautical engineer.
- Nuala Scarisbrick, 82, British anti-abortion activist.
- Ferhan Şensoy, 70, Turkish actor (When Luck Breaks the Door, Pardon, Son Ders) and playwright, internal hemorrhage.
- George S. Tolley, 95, American agricultural economist.
- Thompson Usiyan, 65, Nigerian footballer (Montreal Manic, Tulsa Roughnecks, national team).
- Xu Houze, 87, Chinese geodesist and geophysicist, member of the Chinese Academy of Sciences.
