= Vicente Rodríguez (disambiguation) =

Vicente Rodríguez is a Spanish footballer.

Vicente Rodríguez may also refer to

- Vicente Rodríguez (baseball), Cuban baseball player
- Vicente Rodríguez (boxer), Spanish boxer
- Vicente Rodríguez (politician), Paraguayan politician
