= Antonio Camara =

Antônio Câmara is the name of:

- António Câmara, Portuguese academic
- Antônio Câmara, Brazilian politician
