= Nach Waxman =

Founder of Kitchen Arts & Letters, a notable bookstore

Nach Waxman (20 October 1936 – 4 August 2021) was the founder of New York bookstore Kitchen Arts & Letters. He studied anthropology at university and spent several years working on a PhD, but then left academia to work in book publishing. After a long career in publishing, in which he worked on several cookbooks as an editor, he moved into cookbook retail.

Waxman opened Kitchen Arts & Letters in 1983. At the time it was the only bookstore devoted to cookbooks in New York City. The store became a gathering point for chefs and food writers, and many subsequently cited the store and Waxman himself as having had a major influence on their career.
