= Kazimieras Motieka =

Lithuanian politician and lawyer (1929–2021)

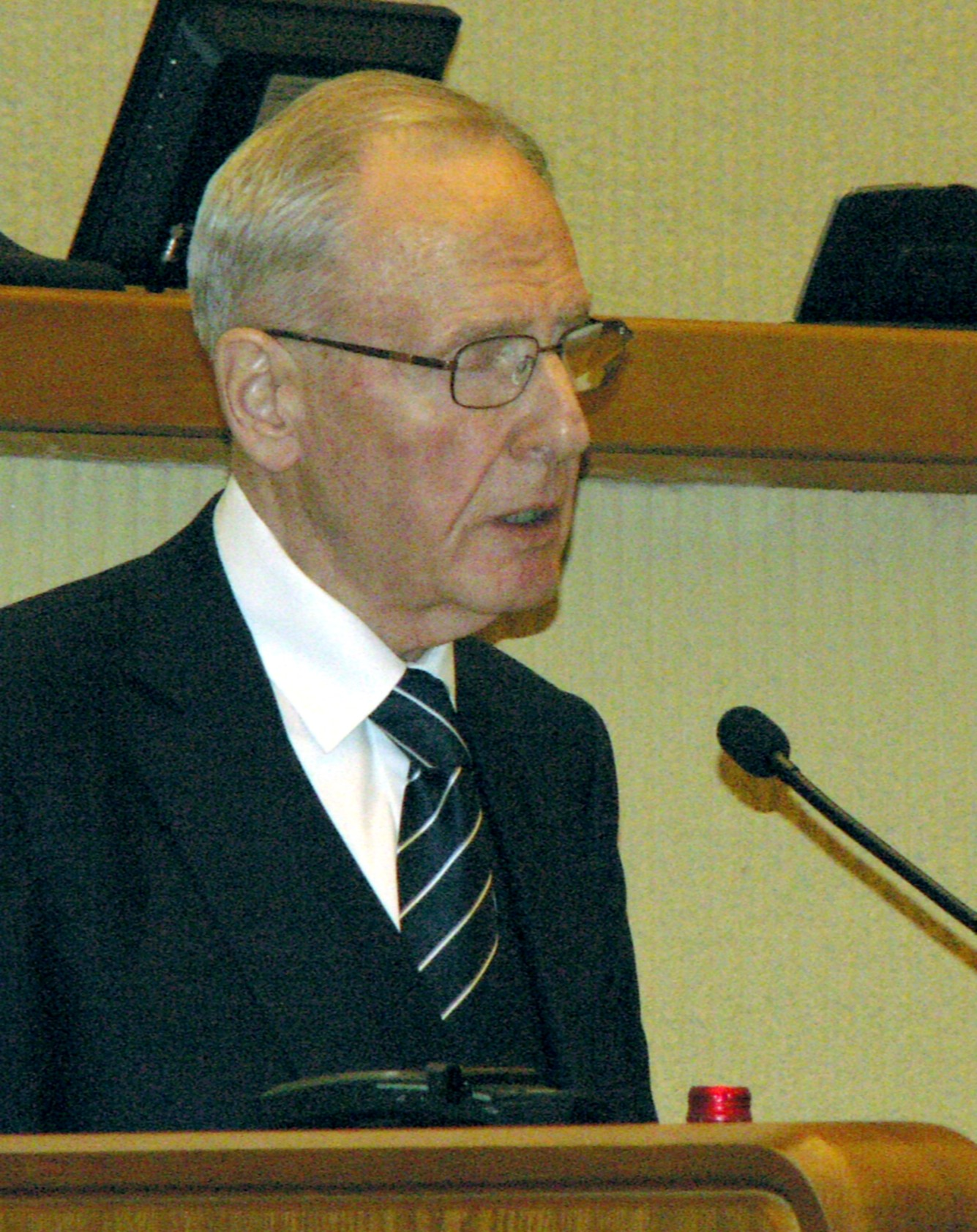
Kazimieras Motieka

Kazimieras Motieka (12 November 1929 in Kaunas – 31 August 2021) was a Lithuanian politician and lawyer. In 1990 he was among those who signed the Act of the Re-Establishment of the State of Lithuania.

He studied law at the graduate level at Vilnius University. In the 1989 Soviet Union legislative election, Motieka was elected as one of the People's Deputies from Lithuanian SSR. Motieka was Attorney at law at the law firm Motieka and Audzevičius.
