= Jean-Pierre Pichard =

French musician and academic (1945–2021)

- Born: 17 September 1945; Châtellerault, France
- Died: 13 August 2021 (aged 75); Lorient, France
- Occupations: Musician; Academic

Jean-Pierre Pichard (17 September 1945 – 13 August 2021) was a French musician and academic. He was known for organizing events promoting the culture of Brittany. He was co-founder of the Festival Interceltique de Lorient.

== Biography ==
Pichard was penn-sonneur of the band Kevrenn de Rennes, with whom he won the Bagadoù National Championship in 1969. He then became a secretary for Bodadeg ar Sonerion.

Pichard served as Director of the Festival Interceltique de Lorient from 1972 to 2007, when he ceded leadership to Lisardo Lombardía.

Jean-Pierre Pichard died in Lorient on 13 August 2021 at the age of 75.

== Awards ==
- Breton de l'année in Armor Magazine (2007)
- Officer of the Ordre des Arts et des Lettres (2016)
