= Alfonso Álvarez Gándara =

Spanish politician (1939–2021)

Secretary General of the Partido Galeguista
- In office 1981–1983

Personal details
- Born: 27 January 1939 Tui, Spain
- Died: 2 August 2021 (aged 82) Vigo, Spain
- Party: Galician Socialist Party; UG; Partido Galeguista

Alfonso Álvarez Gándara (27 January 1939 – 2 August 2021) was a Spanish politician. He was one of the founders of the socialist movement in Galicia.

== Biography ==
The son of Darío Álvarez Blázquez and born in Tui, Alfonso started his career as a columnist in the local press. In 1967, he received the Premio Fernández Latorre for an article titled "La Iglesia no habla la misma lengua que los gallegos". He joined the Galician Socialist Party and became one of its key members.

Gándara ran in the 1977 Spanish general election, but was unsuccessful. However, he was elected in the 1979 municipal elections as part of the Galician Unity party. From 1981 to 1983, he served as Secretary General of the Partido Galeguista. He became a member of the Vigo Bar Association in 1989 and later became President of the Galician Bar Council.

Alfonso Álvarez Gándara died in Vigo on 2 August 2021 at the age of 82.
