= Luciano Pérez de Acevedo =

Spanish politician and lawyer (1943–2021)

President of the Diputación Provincial de Badajoz
- In office 1979–1983

Member of the Assembly of Extremadura
- In office 1983–1987

Personal details
- Born: Luciano Pérez de Acevedo Amo; 31 March 1943 Badajoz, Spain
- Died: 8 August 2021 (aged 78) Badajoz, Spain
- Party: UCD; AP

Luciano Pérez de Acevedo Amo (31 March 1943 – 8 August 2021) was a Spanish politician and lawyer. He served as President of the Diputación Provincial de Badajoz from 1979 to 1983.

== Biography ==
Acevedo was the son of lawyer Luciano Pérez de Acevedo Ortega, who served as Secretary-General of Diputación de Badajoz from 1941 to 1973. Born in Badajoz, he moved to Madrid, where he earned a law degree from the Complutense University of Madrid. He began practicing law in 1965, working in one of the most prestigious law firms in Extremadura. He was married and had four children.

In 1974, Acevedo entered politics, co-founding the Sociedad de Estudios Libra, which was the predecessor of the Federation of Democratic and Liberal Parties. He then joined the Union of the Democratic Centre (UCD), participating in the party's first democratic election. In 1977, he was appointed governmental delegate to the Confederación Hidrográfica del Guadiana and was subsequently involved with drafting the Statute of Autonomy of Extremadura. He was the first President of the Diputación Provincial de Badajoz, serving from 1979 to 1983. He then joined the People's Alliance and served in the Assembly of Extremadura from 1983 to 1987.

Luciano Pérez de Acevedo died in Badajoz on 8 August 2021 at the age of 78.
