= Richard Konvička =

Czech painter (1957–2021)

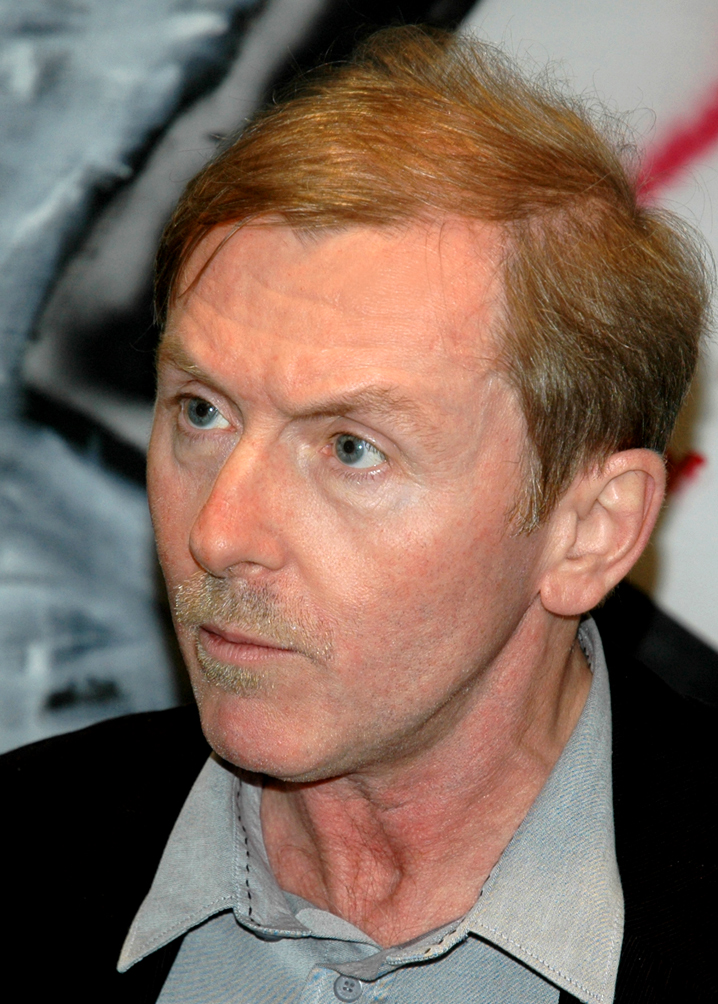
- Born: 30 April 1957
- Died: 6 August 2021; Prague, Czech Republic
- Occupation: Painter

Richard Konvička (30 April 1957 – 6 August 2021) was a Czech painter.
