= Salvador Escrihuela =

Spanish footballer (1951–2021)

Personal information
- Full name: Salvador Escrihuela Quiles
- Date of birth: 28 February 1951
- Place of birth: Tavernes de la Valldigna, Spain
- Date of death: 6 August 2021 (aged 70)
- Height: 1.73 m (5 ft 8 in)
- Position: Winger

Senior career*
Years	Team	Apps	(Gls)
1969–1970	Alzira		
1970–1972	Sabadell	55	(9)
1972–1977	Granada	131	(20)
1977–1980	Alavés	93	(26)
1980–1982	Granada	55	(7)
1982–1983	Gandía		
Total		334	(62)

Managerial career
- 1991–1992: Dénia
- * Club domestic league appearances and goals

Salvador Escrihuela Quiles (28 February 1951 – 6 August 2021) was a Spanish professional football player and manager.

== Career ==
Born in Tavernes de la Valldigna, Escrihuela played as a winger for Alzira, Sabadell, Granada, Alavés, and Gandía. He spent seven seasons with Granada over two spells, scoring 39 goals in 215 games.

He managed Dénia in 1991–92 season.
