= William T. Frankenberger =

American soil scientist

- Born: William Thomas Frankenberger; April 3, 1952; Topeka, Kansas, U.S.
- Died: August 14, 2021 (aged 69)
- Education: Emporia State University; Iowa State University
- Occupation: Soil scientist

William Thomas Frankenberger (April 3, 1952 – August 14, 2021) was an American soil scientist.

== Life and career ==
Frankenberger was born in Topeka, Kansas. He attended Emporia State University, earning his BA degree in biology in 1974. He also attended Iowa State University, earning his MS degree in 1977 and his PhD degree in 1980.

Frankenberger served as a professor in the department of environmental sciences at the University of California, Riverside from 1981 to 2011. During his years as a professor, he was named a distinguished professor, and in 1992, he was named a fellow of the American Association for the Advancement of Science.

== Death ==
Frankenberger died on August 14, 2021, at the age of 69.
