= Abdelhamid Laghouati =

Algerian poet (1943–2021)

Abdelmahid Laghouati
- Born: 25 December 1943; Berrouaghia, Algeria, France
- Died: 11 August 2021 (aged 77)
- Occupation: Poet

Signature
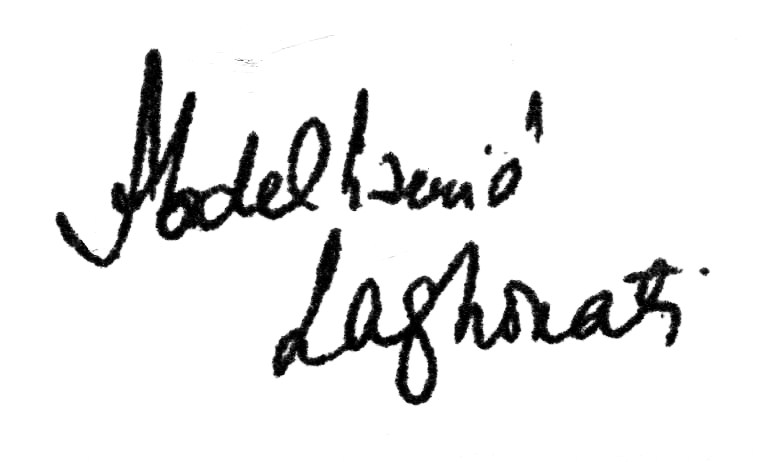

Abdelhamid Laghouati (25 December 1943 – 11 August 2021) was an Algerian poet.

== Biography ==
At the start of the 1960s, Laghouati began his activities in the group "Aouchem" alongside the painters Denis Martinez (painter) and Choukri Mesli, as well as other representatives of Algerian poetry in the French language, such as Jean Sénac, Tahar Djaout, Youcef Sebti, Hamid Skif, and Hamid Tibouchi.

== Bibliography ==
- Poèmes indigènes
- Comme toujours (1977)
- L'Oued noir (1980)
- De si belles insultes (1982)
- Bouches d’incendie (1983)
- Où est passé le grand troupeau ? (1988)
- Gerçures (1994)
- Poèmes (1998)
- Errances (2000)
- Entre sursaut et plénitude (2007)

== Anthologies ==
- Anthologie de la nouvelle poésie algérienne (1971)
- Des Chèvres noires dans un champ de neige ? 30 poètes et 4 peintres algériens (2003)
- Encyclopédie de la poésie algérienne de langue française, 1930-2008 (2009)
