= Michel Steiner =

French writer and psychoanalyst (1946–2021)

- Born: 29 September 1946; Toulouse, France
- Died: 20 August 2021 (aged 74)
- Occupations: Writer; Psychoanalyst

Michel Steiner (29 September 1946 – 20 August 2021) was a French writer and psychoanalyst. He was a doctor of psychology and psychoanalysis and a member of the French National Centre for Scientific Research.

== Works ==
=== Novels ===
- Mainmorte (1999)
- Petites morts : Dans un hôpital psychiatrique de campagne (1999)
- Rachel, la dame de carreau (2000)
- Les Jouets (2001)
- La Machine à jouir (2003)
- Tous nos vœux... (2005)

=== Essays ===
- Le joueur et sa passion : études psychanalytiques et littéraires (1984)
- Le Kol Nidré : Étude psychanalytique d'une prière juive (2007)
- Freud et l'humour juif (2012)

== Distinctions ==
- Prix Œdipe des libraires for Freud et l'humour juif (2013)
