= Peter Ryan (footballer, born 1936) =

Australian rules footballer (1936–2021)

Personal information
- Full name: Peter France Ryan
- Born: 13 September 1936
- Died: 12 August 2021 (aged 84)
- Original team: Hampton
- Height: 180 cm (5 ft 11 in)
- Weight: 78 kg (172 lb)

Playing career^{1}
Years	Club	Games (Goals)
1956–57	South Melbourne	7 (0)
- ^{1} Playing statistics correct to the end of 1957.

Peter Francis Ryan (13 September 1936 – 12 August 2021) was an Australian rules footballer who played with South Melbourne in the Victorian Football League (VFL).

Ryan was also a policeman, reaching the rank of Chief Superintendent, and was heavily involved in the Victoria Police Legacy organisation to assist the families of police who have died, similar to service that Legacy Australia provides to members of the armed forces.

For more than 18 years he volunteered to coach the Sacred Heart Mission football and cricket teams.
