= Alain Boudet =

French poet (1950–2021)

- Born: 1 August 1950; Le Mans, France
- Died: 24 August 2021 (aged 71)
- Occupation: Poet

Alain Boudet (1 August 1950 – 24 August 2021) was a French poet and professor.

== Biography ==
Boudet was a professor of humanities with the Ministry of National Education. He was also a coordinator of reading, writing, and poetry at the Académie de Nantes. Several of his books were chosen for 100 livres pour les écoles, a selection of 100 books by the Ministry of National Education. In 1981, he founded Donner à voir, which became a publishing house for contemporary poetry. He also founded Les Amis des printemps poétiques, a poetry festival which has taken place in La Suze-sur-Sarthe since 1984.

Boudet recorded two CDs of contemporary poetry: Le Promenoir vert, which was composed of 600 works of poetry by 150 poets, and Le Petit Promenoir, which contained 150 poems by 50 poets. His website, La Toile de l'un, was devoted to poetry and its audiences. Boudet recorded two CDs of contemporary poetry: Le Promenoir vert, which was composed of 600 works of poetry by 150 poets, and Le Petit Promenoir, which contained 150 poems by 50 poets. His website, La Toile de l'un, was devoted to poetry and its audiences.

Alain Boudet died on 24 August 2021, at the age of 71.

== Works ==
- Mots de saison
- Drôles d'oiseaux. 17 poèmes à chanter, 19 poèmes à lire
- Marie-Madeleine va-t-à la fontaine
- Marie-Madeleine nettoie sa baleine
- Une baleine dans mon jardin
- Mots de la mer et des étoiles
- Comme le ciel dans la mer
- Quelques mots pour la solitude
- La Volière de Marion
- Au jardin d'Hélène
- Des mots pour vivre
- Au cœur, le poème
- Les Mots du paysage
- Anne-Laure à fleur d'enfance
- Sur le rivage
- Quelques instants d'elles
- Poèmes pour sourigoler
- Poèmes pour sautijouer
- Ici, là
- Le Rire des cascades
- Carrés de l'hypothalamus
- Bribes du Sud
- Haïku de soleil
- Les Mots des mois
- Suite pour Nathan
- Si peu, mais quelques mots
- Pleine lune et bout de soie
- Ici là, sur le rivage
- Rêves de la main
- Roissy
- Dépaysés
