= Rodolfo Aínsa =

Spanish politician (1944–2021)

Rodolfo Aínsa Escartín
- Born: Rodolfo Aínsa Escartín; 17 September 1944
- Died: 26 August 2021 (aged 76)
- Occupations: politician; Senator

Rodolfo Aínsa Escartín (17 September 1944 – 26 August 2021) was a Spanish politician who served as a Senator.
