= Pierre Montaz =

French engineer and businessman (1924–2021)

- Born: 7 May 1924; Levallois-Perret, France
- Died: 3 August 2021 (aged 97)
- Occupations: Engineer; Businessman

Pierre Montaz (7 May 1924 – 3 August 2021) was a French engineer and businessman. He was a pioneer in the field of cable transport and the founder of the ski lift company Montaz Mautino in 1952 alongside his associate Victor Mautino (it was renamed Gimar Montaz Mautino when the company merged with Gimar) . He also invented the detachable ski lift pole alongside Jean Pomagalski.

== Biography ==
Pierre Montaz is one of the pioneers of cable transport, having invented the detachable Surface lift pole with Jean Pomagalski, for whom he worked as a fitter.

== Writings ==
- Onze Américains tombés du ciel (1994)
- Les pionniers du téléski (2006)
