= Emilio Bianchi Di Cárcano =

Argentinian catholic priest (1930–2021)

Emilio Bianchi Di Cárcano (5 April 1930 – 2 August 2021) was an Argentine Roman Catholic priest and prelate. He served as Bishop of the Roman Catholic Diocese of Azul from 1982 to 2006, and Bishop emeritus of Azul until his death in August 2021. He was also the titular bishop of Lesina from 24 February 1976, until 14 April 1982.

Bianchi di Cárcano was born in Buenos Aires on 5 April 1930. He was ordained as a Catholic priest on 14 August 1960, in San Isidro by Monsignor Antonio María Aguirre.

Bishop emeritus Bianchi Di Cárcano died in San Isidro, Buenos Aires, where he resided, on 2 August 2021, at the age of 91. His funeral was held at Santa Rita parish in Boulogne Sur Mer.
