= Bill Todd (Canadian football) =

Canadian football player (1930–2021)

Profile
- Positions: Halfback, Quarterback

Personal information
- Born: July 4, 1930; Winnipeg, Manitoba
- Died: August 11, 2021 (aged 91); Winnipeg, Manitoba
- Listed height: 6 ft 0 in (1.83 m)
- Listed weight: 180 lb (82 kg)

Career history
- 1951: Winnipeg Blue Bombers
- 1953–1956: Saskatchewan Roughriders

Bill Todd (July 4, 1930 – August 11, 2021) was a Canadian professional football player who played for the Winnipeg Blue Bombers and Saskatchewan Roughriders. He previously played junior football for St. Vital in Manitoba.
