= Miguel Ángel Vicco =

Argentine politician and entrepreneur (died 2021)

Private Secretary to the President of Argentina
- In office 1989–1992
- President: Carlos Menem

Personal details
- Born: 1944 or 1945
- Died: 23 August 2021 (aged 76)

Miguel Ángel Vicco (1944/1945 – 23 August 2021) was an Argentine politician and entrepreneur in the dairy industry. He served as private secretary to President Carlos Menem.

== Biography ==
Vicco was close friends with Menem, which allowed him to gain the role of secretary when Menem became president in 1989. His name entered the public eye when the case known as Milkgate, which also involved Carlos Spadone, was revealed in November 1991. The incident involved the purchase of large quantities of powdered milk for social programs, but 47 tons of the milk were declared unfit for consumption. Vicco and Spadone were indicted, and Vicco was removed from office in January 1992. Years passed before the case was resolved, and it was eventually closed in 2002.

Miguel Ángel Vicco died of complications from intestinal obstruction surgery on 23 August 2021 at the age of 76.
