= Álvaro Blancarte =

Mexican painter (1937–2021)

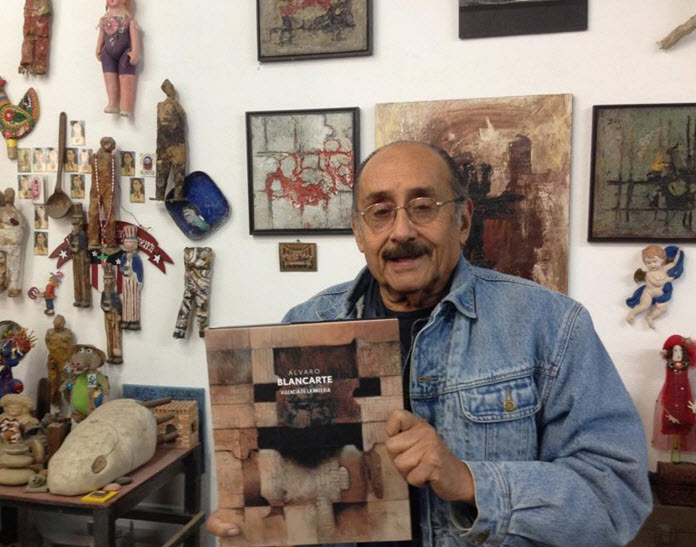
- Álvaro Blancarte
- Born: Álvaro Blancarte Osuna; March 27, 1934; Culiacán, Mexico
- Died: August 22, 2021 (aged 87); Tecate, Mexico
- Known for: Painting, sculpture, murals

Álvaro Blancarte Osuna (March 27, 1937 – August 22, 2021) was a Mexican painter, sculptor, and muralist.
