= Júlio Chaves =

Brazilian voice actor (1944–2021)

Júlio Chaves (December 28, 1944 in Rio de Janeiro – August 10, 2021 in Rio de Janeiro) was a Brazilian voice actor who performed the Brazilian Portuguese language dubbing for numerous international actors and films.

Chaves was the official Brazilian voice of several well-known film actors in releases in Brazil, including Rowan Atkinson, Andy Garcia, Mel Gibson, Dustin Hoffman, Jeremy Irons, and Tommy Lee Jones.

== Biography ==
In films, Chaves notably provided the Brazilian voice of Marlin, the clownfish father of Nemo, in the Pixar films Finding Nemo (2003) and its sequel, Finding Dory (2016).

Chaves began his voice-over and dubbing career in the 1970s, eventually becoming one of Brazil's most prolific voice actors.

Chaves died from complications of COVID-19 in Rio de Janeiro on August 10, 2021, at the age of 76. His death was confirmed by his daughter, Juliana. Chaves' son, Márcio Chaves, who was also a voice actor, died in 2016.
