= Robert B. Tanguy =

United States Air Force major general (1927–2021)

- Born: January 24, 1927; Logansport, Indiana, US
- Died: August 20, 2021 (aged 94)
- Allegiance: United States of America
- Branch: United States Air Force
- Service years: 1952–1981
- Rank: Major general
- Commands: Comptroller of the United States Army

Robert Bringhurst Tanguy (January 24, 1927 – August 20, 2021) was a United States Air Force major general who served as Commandant of the Armed Forces Staff College from 1980 to 1981. He was a graduate of the United States Military Academy (1952).
