= Benoît Genecand =

Swiss politician (1964–2021)

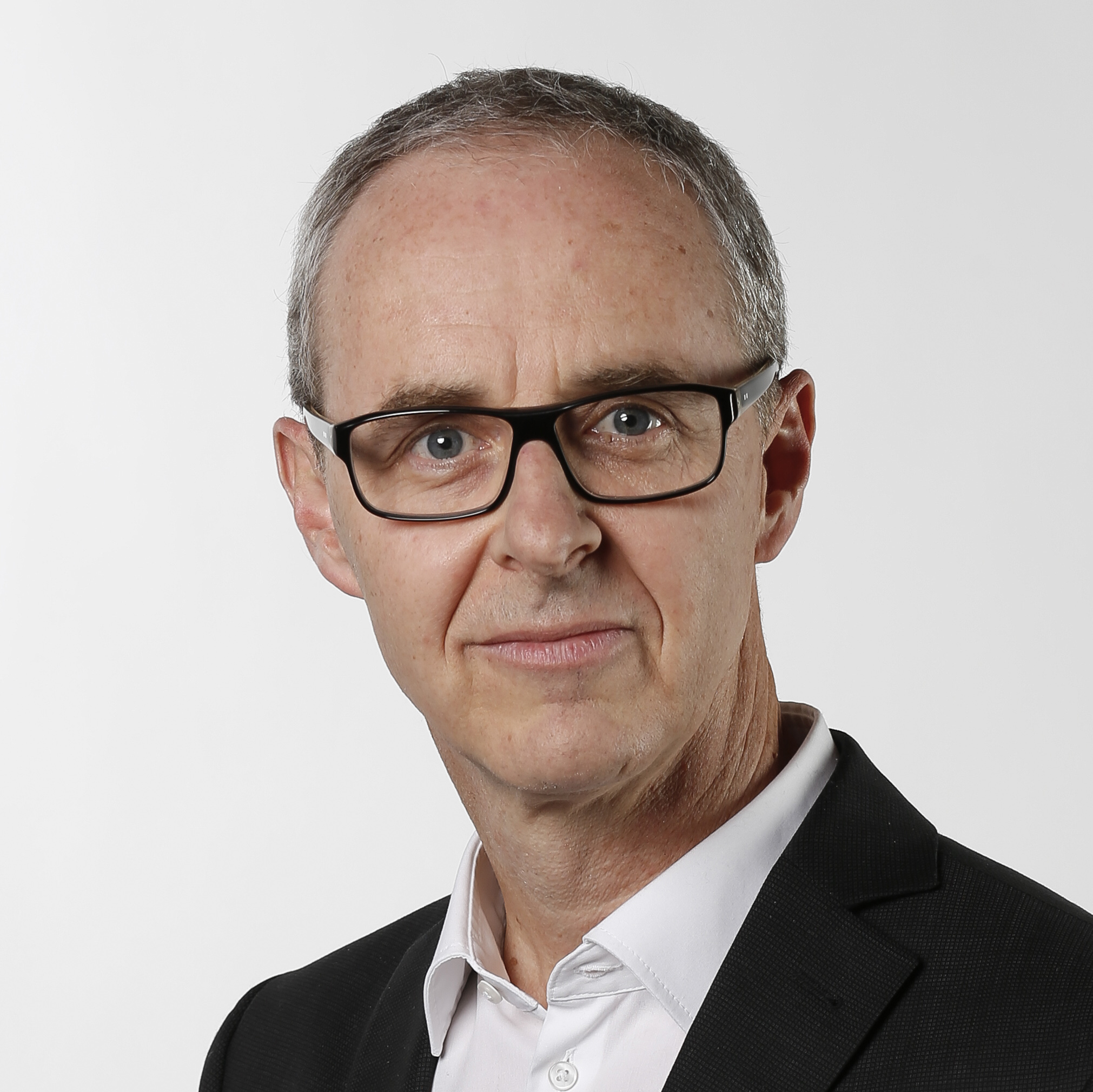
- Genecand in 2015

Member of the National Council of Switzerland
- In office 30 November 2015 – 1 December 2019
- Constituency: Canton of Geneva

Member of the Grand Council of Geneva
- In office 7 November 2013 – 12 November 2015

Personal details
- Born: 28 January 1964 Geneva, Switzerland
- Died: 11 August 2021 (aged 57) Geneva, Switzerland
- Party: PLR

Benoît Genecand (28 January 1964 – 11 August 2021) was a Swiss politician. A member of FDP.The Liberals (PLR), he served on the National Council of Switzerland from 2015 to 2019 and the Grand Council of Geneva from 2013 to 2015.

== Biography ==
Genecand was born in Geneva on 28 January 1964 to a family of farmers. He had the citizenship of Switzerland and France. He had a sister, Marie-Pierre, who became a journalist with Le Temps. Their father, Jean-Claude Genecand, was a baker by profession and served in the Grand Council of Geneva as a member of the Christian Democratic People's Party of Switzerland from 1985 to 1997.

Genecand earned a degree in political science from the University of Geneva in 1988 and was initially hired by UBS as a branch manager. He was Director of UBS Geneva from 2002 to 2007. He then became an independent consultant and administrator.

In June 2019, it was revealed that Genecand was suffering from an advanced stage of cancer. A few days later, he announced that he would not seek re-election in that year's election. He died on 11 August 2021 at the age of 57 in Geneva.

Genecand was married to Corinne Notz, a masseuse. He was the father of five children, including Grand Council of Geneva and PLR member Adrien Genecand, who had been engaged in politics before his father.

=== Political career ===
Genecand joined the PLR in 2011, after considering the Swiss People's Party to be too centralized. He served on the Constituent Assembly of Geneva from 19 October 2008 to 31 May 2012. He was a member of the Grand Council of Geneva from 7 November 2013 to 12 November 2015 as part of the PLR. His seat was succeeded by Christophe Ameunier following his election to the National Council. He was also a candidate for the Council of States, in which he finished third and did not earn a seat. He sat on the Committee on the Environment, Regional Planning and Energy.
