= Jean-Pierre Fragnière =

Swiss academic and sociologist (1944–2021)

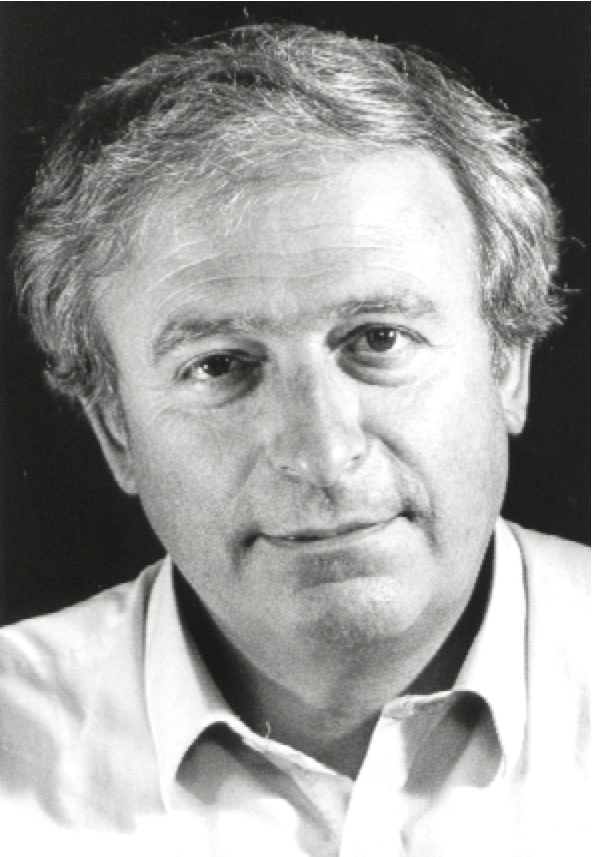
- Fragnière in 2014
- Born: 18 September 1944; Veysonnaz, Switzerland
- Died: 22 August 2021 (aged 76)
- Occupation: Professor

Jean-Pierre Fragnière (18 September 1944 – 22 August 2021) was a Swiss academic and political scientist. He taught at the Haute école spécialisée de Lausanne and the University of Geneva at the Faculty of Economic and Social Sciences. He founded the Institut universitaire âges et générations and served as Scientific Director from 1998 to 2009 in Sion.

== Biography ==
Fragnière earned a degree in theology from the University of Fribourg, a degree in sociology from the University of Geneva, and a doctorate in social sciences and education from the University of Lausanne. Ordained a priest in 1969, he then became a professor at the École d'études sociales et pédagogiques de Lausanne in 1971. He then taught at the University of Geneva and later at the University of Neuchâtel from 2005 to 2010. In 1998, he co-founded the Institut Universitaire Âges et Générations and served as Scientific Director until 2009. He also served as Secretary of the Société suisse de Sociologie, Vice-President of the Association Suisse de Politique Sociale, and was the founder and Director of Éditions Réalités Sociales.

Jean-Pierre Fragnière died on 22 August 2021 at the age of 76.

== Books ==
- Les ambiguïtés de la démocratie locale (1976)
- Le pouvoir dans la ville, préface de J.-W. Lapierre (1978)
- Les ergothérapeutes, problèmes des professions paramédicales (1979)
- Santé et politique sociale (1980)
- Droit et politique sociale (1980)
- Un autre travail social (1981)
- Assister, éduquer et soigner (1982)
- Maîtriser la division du travail dans les professions sociales et les professions de la santé (1984)
- Comment faire un mémoire ? (1985)
- Les défis de la santé III, Pratiques et innovations (1985)
- Comment réussir un mémoire (1986)
- Dix ans de politique sociale en Suisse (1986)
- Wie schreibt man eine Diplomarbeit ? (1988)
- L'action sociale demain (1988)
- Sécurité sociale en Suisse, Une introduction (1988)
- La boîte à outils, un guide pour le temps des études (1989)
- Manuel de l'action sociale en Suisse (1989)
- Le temps des bénévoles (1989)
- L'étude de la politique sociale (1990)
- Pratiques des solidarités (1991)
- Échec scolaire et illettrisme (1992)
- Wegleitung durch die Institutionen der sozialen Sicherheit in der Schweiz (1993)
- Familles et sécurité sociale (1994)
- Repenser la sécurité sociale (1995)
- Asi se escribe una monografia (1996)
- La sécurité sociale en Europe et en Suisse (1996)
- Retraités en action. L'engagement social des groupements de retraités (1996)
- Maintien à domicile, le temps de l'affirmation (1997)
- Bewegt ins Alter (1997)
- Politiques sociales en Suisse, Enjeux et débats (1998)
- Dictionnaire suisse de politique sociale (1998)
- Politiques familiales, l'impasse ? (1999)
- La vérité est multiple. Essais de sociologie (2000)
- Pour les retraités. Joies et responsabilités (2001)
- Politiques sociales pour le XXIe siècle (2001)
- Le système des trois piliers a-t-il un avenir ? (2001)
- Dictionnaire suisse de politique sociale (2002)
- L'avenir (2003)
- Les relations entre les générations. Petit glossaire (2004)
- Entre science et action, La démographie au service de la cité (2004)
- Le furet, répertoire internet de la politique et de l’action sociales en Suisse (2005)
- Solidarités entre les générations (2010)
- Les retraites. Des projets de vie (2011)
- Dictionnaire des âges et des générations (2012)
- Retraites actives et solidaires en Valais. Aktive und solidarische Rentner im Wallis (2013)
- Une politique des âges et des générations (2013)
