= Manuel Monerris =

Spanish politician (1946–2021)

Member of the Parliament of the Balearic Islands
- In office 11 June 2011 – 31 March 2015
- Preceded by: Margaret Mercadal Camps
- Constituency: Menorca

Mayor of Ferreries
- In office 11 June 2011 – 12 June 2015
- Preceded by: Josep Carreres Coll
- Succeeded by: Josep Carreres Coll

Personal details
- Born: Manuel José Monerris Barberá; 19 March 1946 Castellón de la Plana, Spain
- Died: 29 August 2021 (aged 75)
- Party: PP

Manuel José Monerris Barberá (19 March 1946 – 29 August 2021) was a Spanish politician. A member of the People's Party (PP), he served in the Parliament of the Balearic Islands as well as mayor of Ferreries from 2011 to 2015.

== Biography ==
Monerris graduated from the National University of Distance Education in 1977 and briefly played in the lower categories of CD Castellón. In 1977, he was elected Director of the Escola Castell de Santa Àgueda de Ferreries, a position he held until 1989. From 1996 to 2003 and again from 2008 to 2010, he was Director of the IES Biel Martí de Ferreries.

From 1999 to 2003, Monerris was a member of the Insular Council of Menorca. From 2003 to 2007, he was territorial director of the Ministry of Education and Culture of Balearic Government in Menorca.

In 2011, Monerris was elected to the Parliament of Balearic Islands following the resignation of Margaret Mercadel Camps. Also in 2011, he was elected Mayor of Ferreries.

Manuel Monerris died on 29 August 2021 at the age of 75.
