= Guy Lalumière =

Canadian graphic artist and photographer (1930–2021)

- Born: 20 June 1930; Montreal, Quebec, Canada
- Died: 11 August 2021 (aged 91); Victoria, British Columbia, Canada
- Occupations: Graphic artist Photographer; Professor

Guy Lalumière (20 June 1930 – 11 August 2021) was a Canadian graphic artist, photographer, and professor.

== Biography ==
From 1936 to 1948, Lalumière attended the École Chomedey de Maisonneuve in Montreal. He then enrolled at the École des beaux-arts de Montréal and graduated in 1953. He became fascinated with the architecture of the National Autonomous University of Mexico, and he took up an interest in photography. He then worked in the workshop of Henry Eveleigh before opening his own graphic design studio in 1956. He also began teaching decorative composition and advertising art at the École des beaux-arts de Montréal. For one year, he worked in a graphic design studio in Paris, the only time in his life when he worked in a studio. Thereafter, he solely worked freelance so that he could keep his work independent.

In 1962, he founded the Studio Guy Lalumière. He relocated the studio in 1964 so that it overlooked Place Jacques-Cartier. He notably provided services for Gustave Maeder, designer of the Québec Pavilion at Expo 67. In 1969, he founded Guy Lalumière et Associés alongside Marcel Dauphinais and Robert Charbonneau, which assisted with visual communication, graphics, and photography until the 1980s. He also collaborated with the Université de Montréal in the 1970s as a visiting professor. On 28 October 2010, he was honored by the Société des designers graphiques du Québec.

Lalumière died in Victoria, British Columbia on 11 August 2021 at the age of 91.

== Public collections ==
- Centre d'histoire de Montréal
- Musée de la civilisation
- Musée national des beaux-arts du Québec
