= Stefano Di Marino =

Italian writer (1961–2021)

Stefano Di Marino (28 March 1961 – 6 August 2021) was an Italian author of pulp fiction, specializing in the horror and thriller genres. He wrote hundreds of books, using pseudonyms such as Stephen Gunn and Xavier LeNormand. He died by suicide in his home town of Milan at the age of 60.
