= Egon Guttman =

German law professor (1927–2021)

Egon Guttman (January 27, 1927 in Neuruppin, Germany - August 13, 2021) was professor of law and Levitt Memorial Trust Scholar Emeritus at American University, Washington College of Law. His major research fields were corporate and commercial law. He has taught in various universities in England, Canada, Israel, and Sudan.

== Biography and education ==
Guttman was born in Neuruppin, Germany, in 1927. His parents were Isaac Guttman and Blima Guttman (née Liss). His family moved to Berlin when he was three years old, where he and his sister and brother Herman were taunted for being Jewish.

After surviving the Holocaust, Guttman emigrated to the United States in 1958 and was naturalized in 1968.

Guttman obtained a bachelor's degree in Laws at University of London in 1950 and continued with a master's degree at the same university (1952). Guttman studied post-graduate in Northwestern University School Law, Chicago (1959).

As a member of the American Law Institute (ALI) and the American Bar Association (ABA), Professor Guttman was involved in the revisions of various Articles of the Uniform Commercial Code, and as a member of U.S. Department of State Working Groups in the drafting of conventions relating to international commercial transactions. One of the areas of expertise was in problems of international aspects of capital raising.

Guttman was married to Inge Weinberg. On August 13, 2021, Guttman died in Silver Spring, Maryland.

== Selected publications ==
- Egon Guttman, Modern Securities Transfers (4th ed., West Group 2010).
- Egon Guttman, Louis Del Duca, Miller, Winship, & Hennings, Problems and Materials on Sales Under the Uniform Commercial Code, and the Convention on International Sales of Goods, Commercial Transactions Volume Two (Anderson & Co. 2006).
- Egon Guttman, Del Duca, Miller, Winship & Henning, Secured Transactions Under the Uniform Commercial Code and International Commerce (Anderson & Co. 2002).
- Egon Guttman, Comments on the Bulgarian Law on Banking (ABA-CEELI Publication Dec. 1998).
- Egon Guttman, Comments on the Moldovan Foreign Investment Law (ABA-CEELI Publication Sept. 1998).
- Egon Guttman, Analysis of the Draft Book of Listing Rules on Varazdin OTC Market for the Republic of Croatia (ABA-CEELI Publication Jan. 23, 1998).
- Egon Guttman, Louis Del Duca, & Alphonse Squillante, Problems and Materials on Negotiable Instruments Under the Uniform Commercial Code and the United Nations Convention on International Bills of Exchange and International Promissory Notes, Commercial Transactions Vol. 3 (Anderson & Co. 1993).
- Egon Guttman, Louis F. Del Duca, & Alphonse M. Squillante, Problems and Materials on Secured Transactions Under the Uniform Commercial Code, Commercial Transactions (Anderson & Co. 1992) (reprinted in Teachers' Manual, 1998. Supplement with Fred H. Miller, 1996).
- Egon Guttman, Cases and Materials On Policy and the Legal Environment (Johns Hopkins U. 1973) (reprinted in 2d. rev. ed., with Robert Vaughn, 1978).
- Egon Guttman, Doing Business in the District of Columbia: No. 3--The Beauty Parlor (Howard U. 1969).
- Egon Guttman, Techniques, Procedures and Pitfalls Under the Uniform Commercial Code—Proceedings of the First Annual Uniform (Gorham & Lamont, Inc. 1968).
- Egon Guttman, Doing Business in the District of Columbia: No. 2--The Valet Service Establishment (Howard U. 1968).
- Egon Guttman, Doing Business in the District of Columbia: No. 1--The Barbershop (Howard U. 1967).
- Egon Guttman, Mississippi Law Institute: Transactions—Uniform Commercial Code—A Negotiable Instruments Law for Investment Securities—Article 8 (Bobbs-Merrill Publg. Co. 1967).
- Egon Guttman, Study of the Uniform Commercial Code for the State of New Jersey, Article 8 Investment Securities (Soney and Sage Co. 1960).
- Egon Guttman, Crime, Cause and Treatment (Sudan Jud. 1957).
- Egon Guttman, The Comparative Conflict of Laws, with Reference to the Legitimacy and Legitimation of Children (U. of London Press 1952).
