= József Gerlach =

Hungarian diver (1938–2021)

Personal information
- Nationality: Hungarian
- Born: 28 October 1938 Budapest, Hungary
- Died: August 18, 2021 (aged 82) Ontario, California, U.S.

Sport
- Sport: Diving

József Gerlach (28 October 1938 – 18 August 2021) was a Hungarian diver. He competed in two events at the 1956 Summer Olympics.

Gerlach died in Ontario, California on 18 August 2021, at the age of 82.
