= Noureddine Bahbouh =

Algerian politician (1949–2021)

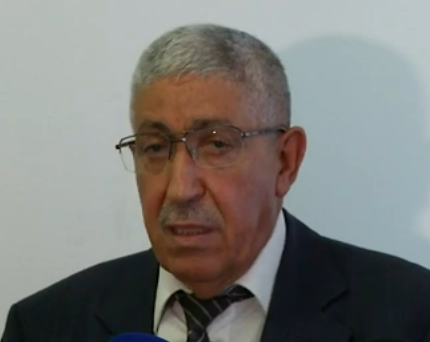
Noureddine Bahbouh

Noureddine Bahbouh (Arabic: نورالدين بحبوح; 24 January 1949 – 6 August 2021) was the Algerian minister of agriculture in the 1995 government of Mokdad Sifi. He was born in Bordj Bou Arréridj, Algeria, France.
