= John Anton (cricketer) =

English cricketer (1926–2021)

Cricket information
- Batting: Right-handed
- Bowling: Right arm medium

Career statistics
| Competition | First-class |
|---|---|
| Matches | 14 |
| Runs scored | 361 |
| Batting average | 15.69 |
| 100s/50s | 0/0 |
| Top score | 45 |
| Catches/stumpings | 2/– |
- Source: Cricinfo, 14 April 2023

John Hamish Hugh Anton (19 September 1926 – 28 August 2021) was an English cricketer who played 14 first-class games: ten for Cambridge University and four for Worcestershire.

Anton was born in Kidderminster on 19 September 1926. He went to Rugby School, being made captain of the cricket team in 1944.

In 1949, he made his first-class debut with Cambridge, scoring 45 against Sussex, and he played nine times for them that season, although he did not gain his Blue. He also appeared for the university team on one further occasion, in 1950, but his subsequent four first-class matches were with Worcestershire late in that same season. Although his fielding was excellent, he was unable to make enough runs – his best score for the county was only 26 – and it was not altogether a surprise when he failed to reappear in 1951.

Anton died in Brisbane, Australia on 28 August 2021, at the age of 94.
