= Brigitte Maillard =

French writer and singer (1954–2021)

- Born: 1954; French Congo, French Equatorial Africa, France
- Died: 14 August 2021 (aged 66); Quimper, France
- Occupations: Writer; Singer

Brigitte Maillard (1954 – 14 August 2021) was a French poet, writer, and singer.

== Biography ==
In 2004, Maillard began to explore a career in poetry. She created the site Monde en poésie, subtitled Pour que vivent la poésie le monde et les mots pour le dire, in 2008. She hosted the radio show Monde en poésie in 2010 and 2011 on Aligre FM, and subsequently on her website from 2015 to 2019.

Maillard died in Quimper on 14 August 2021 at the age of 66.

== Bibliography ==
- La simple évidence de la beauté (2011)
- Soleil, vivant soleil (2013)
- À l'éveil du jour (2015)
- L'Au-delà du monde (2017)
- La simple évidence de la beauté (2019)
- Il y a un chemin (2019)
- Le Mystère des choses inexplicables (2021)
