= Eva Fastag =

Polish-born Holocaust survivor (1917–2021)

- Born: 3 April 1917; Warsaw, Poland
- Died: 12 August 2021 (aged 104); Israel
- Occupations: Resistant, secretary

Eva Fastag (3 April 1917 – 12 August 2021) was a Polish-born Holocaust survivor and resistant. During World War II, she was interned at the Mechelen transit camp.

== Biography ==
Fastag was born in Warsaw on 3 April 1917. In 1919, her family moved to Antwerp. She attended a Dutch-language primary school and studied humanities in French. She began working as a secretary for a shipping company and later for an insurance company. The only Jewish employee, her boss continued to allow her to work as long as she did not wear the Star of David. However, she was deported from Antwerp while leaving a train from Brussels on 27 July 1942 and sent to Fort Breendonk, where she worked as a secretary thanks to her German language ability and work experience. She was sent to Mechelen in the 1st convoy of 4 August 1942, where she wrote a list of names of the deportees. Fastag was released on 9 June 1944, three days after the Normandy landings, as part of a prisoner exchange with Germans in Mandatory Palestine.

In 2008, Fastag wrote a letter to Simone Veil regarding her experience. In 2019, she testified in Pieter Serrien's book De Laatste Getuige - Eva Fastag: Hoe ik de Dossinkazerne en de Holocaust overleefde to ensure the memory of the Holocaust lives on.

Eva Fastag died in Israel on 12 August 2021 at the age of 104.
