= Michèle Minerva =

French pétanque player (1959–2021)

- Born: 29 January 1959
- Died: 23 August 2021 (aged 62)
- Occupation: Pétanque player

Michèle Minerva (29 January 1959 – 23 August 2021) was a French pétanque player.

== Biography ==
Alongside Simon Cortes, Minerva won the 2001 French Pétanque Championship in mixed doubles. The pair defeated Sylvie Jaunet and Philippe Suchaud with a score of 13 to 10.
