= Marek Minda =

Polish politician (1950–2021)

Marek Minda (14 February 1950 – 13 August 2021) was a Polish doctor and politician who served as a Senator.
