= Alicinha Cavalcanti =

Brazilian promoter (1961–2021)

- Born: Alicia Regina Alves Cavalcante; 16 November 1961; São José do Rio Preto, São Paulo, Brazil
- Died: 2 August 2021 (aged 59); São Paulo, São Paulo, Brazil
- Occupation: Event promoter
- Spouse: Rodrigo Biondi

Alice Regina Alves Cavalcante (16 November 1961 – 2 August 2021), better known as Alicinha Cavalcanti, was a Brazilian event promoter.

Born in São José do Rio Preto, a municipality of São Paulo to parents from Ceará, Cavalcanti was considered one of the best known promoters in Brazil. In her mailing, there were more than 17,000 names of famous people. She began her career at the age of 20 in 1983, at the "Gallery", sponsored by the owner of the house, José Victor Oliva.

Passionate about extreme leisure activities and sports such as jiu-jitsu, Cavalcanti had suffered several accidents that necessitated four pins in her knee, eleven screws and a plate in her leg.

== Illness and death ==
In 2015, Cavalcanti was diagnosed with primary progressive aphasia. In 2017, she was also diagnosed with amyotrophic lateral sclerosis (ALS), a degenerative and incurable disease. She died at the Albert Einstein Israelite Hospital in São Paulo on 2 August 2021 at age 59 as a result of primary progressive aphasia.
