= Pio Teek =

Namibian judge (1947–2021)

Pio Marapi Teek

Justice of the Supreme Court of Namibia
- In office 28 May 2003 – 14 October 2005

Personal details
- Born: 23 February 1947 Mariental, South West Africa
- Died: 10 August 2021 (aged 74) Windhoek
- Children: 6 (1 daughter called Pia Teek)
- Education: University of the Western Cape; University of Cambridge

Pio Marapi Teek (23 February 1947 – 10 August 2021) was a Namibian judge and ombudsman.

== Professional career ==
Before Namibia's independence in 1990, Teek worked as a lawyer and campaigned primarily for black rights. From 1990 to 1992, Teek was Namibia's first ombudsman and in 1992 he became the first black high court judge. In 1999 he became President of the Court and on 28 May 2003 he was appointed judge of the Supreme Court, the highest court in the country. Teek remained in this position until his early retirement on 14 October 2005.

== Allegations ==
Teek was arrested on 31 January 2005 and charged with child sexual abuse in October 2005. After 13 years of negotiations, he was acquitted of all allegations at the end of 2018.

He then sued the state, the public prosecutor and the police for reparations of 23 million Namibian dollars. The lawsuit was ultimately dismissed in 2021, a few weeks before his death.
