= Maurice Vandeweyer =

Belgian writer and mathematician (1945–2021)

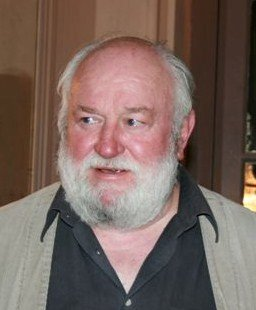
- Vandeweyer in 2012
- Born: 21 February 1945; Vliermaal, Belgium
- Died: 17 August 2021 (aged 76); Couvin, Belgium
- Occupations: Writer; Mathematician

Maurice Vandeweyer (21 February 1945 – 17 August 2021) was a Belgian comic book author and mathematician. He also expressed interest in theatre in the region Entre-Sambre-et-Meuse through chronicles and books. He also wrote about gastronomy.

== Biography ==
Vandeweyer was a professor of mathematics. He closely followed regional cuisine, beer, and wine. He participated in the radio show Gastronomiquement vôtre on Sky Rock and Nostalgie Wallonie. He also worked as a freelance journalist and a columnist for the newspaper L'Avenir.

Vandeweyer became a member of SABAM and began writing Contes et légendes de l'Entre-Sambre-et-Meuse. He attributed many of his works to the legends of the Entre-Sambre-et-Meuse region. In 2002, he published Quand l'Entre-Sambre-et-Meuse se met à table. In 2008, he published Histoires de l'Entre-Sambre-et-Meuse with Éditions Racine. In 2013, he wrote a book on Ivan Ivanof, a local Belgian personality and political refugee from Bulgaria.

In 2012, Vandeweyer created a puppet theatre with Christophe Delire and Martine Jamin, called the Compagnie du Tradery. For the first staging, he wrote the puppet show La Geste de Guillaume.

Maurice Vandeweyer died in Couvin on 17 August 2021 at the age of 76.

== Publications ==
=== Books ===
- Contes et légendes de l'Entre-Sambre-et-Meuse (2000)
- Quand l'Entre-Sambre-et-Meuse se met à table (2002)
- Autres contes de l'Entre-Sambre-et-Meuse (2004)
- Histoire de l'Entre-Sambre-et-Meuse (2008)
- Ivan Ivanov, sa 25e heure (2013)
- Fernand Platbrood, l'Alter-Native, ça presse pour une énergie durable et équitable (2014)
- Balades entre châteaux et légendes (2020)

=== Comic books ===
- Le Comte à la houssette (1980)
- Landru (1987)
- Le Fraudeur Calteau (1990)

=== Theatre ===
- Le Bac (1989)
- La geste de Guillaume (2012)
- Djosèf et Françwès (2013)
