= Paolo Saviane =

Italian politician (1962–2021)

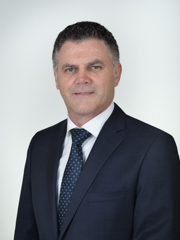

Member of the Senate
- In office 23 March 2018 – 20 August 2021
- Constituency: Veneto

Personal details
- Born: 20 March 1962 Ponte nelle Alpi, Veneto, Italy
- Died: 20 August 2021 (aged 59) Padua, Veneto, Italy
- Party: Lega Nord
- Profession: Politician, businessman

Paolo Saviane (20 March 1962 – 20 August 2021) was an Italian politician.

In 2015 he was unanimously elected provincial secretary of the Northern League of Belluno.

== Political career ==
In the 2018 Italian general election he was elected to the Senate of the Republic, on the Northern League list in the Veneto constituency .

He died on 20 August 2021 while hospitalised for heart surgery.
