= Ibrahim Kalil Konaté =

Guinean politician (1955–2021)

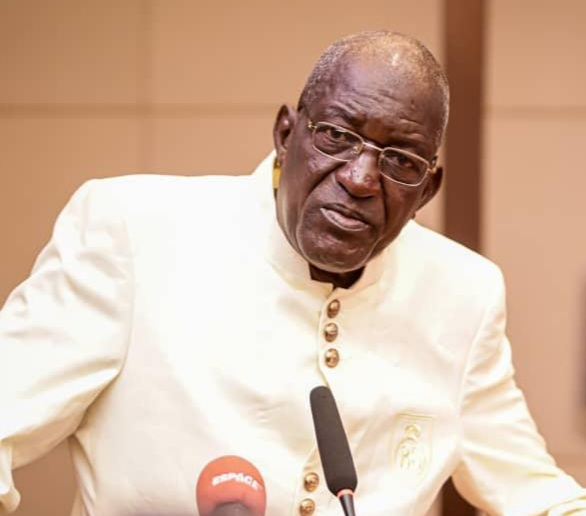

Minister of National Education and Literacy
- In office 27 February 2017 – 26 May 2018
- President: Alpha Condé
- Preceded by: Ibrahima Kourouma
- Succeeded by: Mory Sangaré

Personal details
- Born: 2 August 1955 Kankan, Guinea
- Died: 14 August 2021 (aged 66) Conakry, Guinea
- Party: RPG

Ibrahim Kalil Konaté (2 August 1955 – 14 August 2021) was a Guinean politician and computer scientist.

He served as Minister of National Education and Literacy and was Chairman of the Board of Directors of the Loterie nationale de Guinée.

== Biography ==
Konaté was born in Kankan on 2 August 1955 and attended primary school at the École primaire Dramé Oumar. In 1998, he earned a degree in mathematical science from the Lycée Aviation Conakry. He also earned a degree in management informatics from the Université International Collège.

Ibrahim Kalil was appointed Minister of National Education and Literacy on 27 February 2017 and served until 26 May 2018. He served as Chairman of the Board of Directors of the Loterie nationale de Guinée from 29 January 2019 until his death.

Ibrahim Kalil Konaté died of COVID-19 in Conakry on 14 August 2021, at the age of 66.

== Awards ==
- COPE-Guinée Prize for good performance (2017)
