= Manuel Guerra Gómez =

Spanish writer (1931–2021)

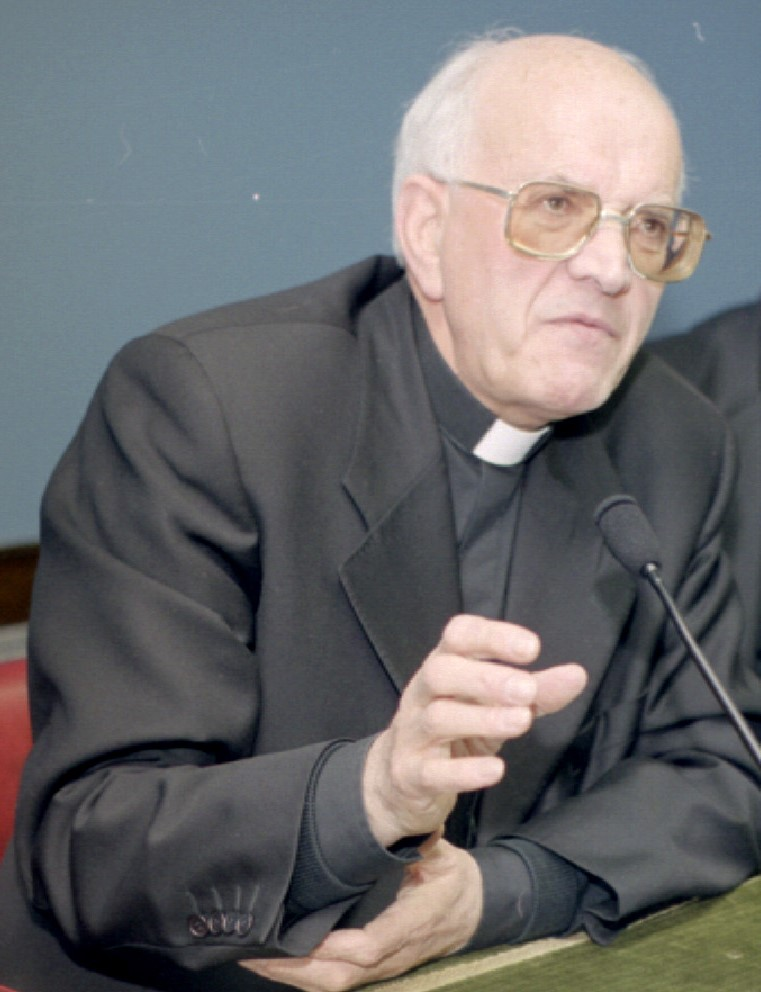
- Born: 27 July 1931; Merindad de Sotoscueva, Spain
- Died: 25 August 2021 (aged 90); Burgos, Spain
- Occupation: Writer

Manuel Guerra Gómez (27 July 1931 – 25 August 2021) was a Spanish writer and religious figure.

== Biography ==
Gómez was a consultant for the Spanish Episcopal Conference and a member of the Real Academia de Doctores de España. He specialized in classical antiquity, religious history, and Freemasonry, on which he wrote numerous books and articles. He was a co-founder of the Red Iberoamericana de Estudio de las Sectas in 2005. He was the author of La trama masónica, which denounced the Masonic affiliation of Prime Minister José Luis Rodríguez Zapatero.

Manuel Guerra Gómez died in Burgos on 25 August 2021 at the age of 90.

== Works ==
- Antropologías y teología (1976)
- Interpretación religiosa del arte rupestre (1984)
- El sacerdocio femenino (en las religiones greco-romanas y en el cristianismo de los primeros siglos) (1987)
- La traducción de los textos litúrgicos. Algunas consideraciones filológico-teológicas (1990)
- Simbología románica. El cristianismo y otras religiones en el arte románico (1993)
- El idioma del Nuevo Testamento (1995)
- El enigma del hombre (1999)
- Jesucristo y nosotros (2002)
- Un misterio de amor. Solteros, ¿por qué? (en los primeros siglos de la Iglesia) (2002)
- Las sectas y su invasión del mundo hispano: una guía (2003)
- 100 preguntas-clave sobre New Age/Nueva Era (2004)
- Diccionario enciclopédico de las sectas (2005)
- Historia de las Religiones (2006)
- La trama masónica (2006)
- 100 preguntas-clave sobre New Age. Un catecismo no elemental
