= Fran Frisch =

American cartoonist (1948–2021)

Francis John (Fran) Frisch (August 18, 1948 – August 29, 2021) was an American cartoonist for the Bay Area Reporter and Bear Magazine.

== Personal life ==
Frisch was born in Saint Paul, Minnesota, and graduated from Hill Murray High School in 1966. In 1990, Frisch relocated to San Francisco. An openly gay man and a bear, Frisch was praised for the cartoons he drew for the magazine Bear. It was there he became known as the "Beartoonist of San Francisco". With his new-found popularity, Frisch became a founding member of Bears of San Francisco and routinely donated his artwork to support LGBTQ organizations.

== Later life, death, and legacy ==
Retiring in 2007, Frisch moved to Palm Springs, CA. He died of cancer shortly after his 73rd birthday.

In 2017, the GLBT History Museum held an exhibition of his work entitled "Beartoonist of San Francisco: Sketching an Emerging Subculture".
