= W. S. Renn Jr. =

American football coach (1928–2021)

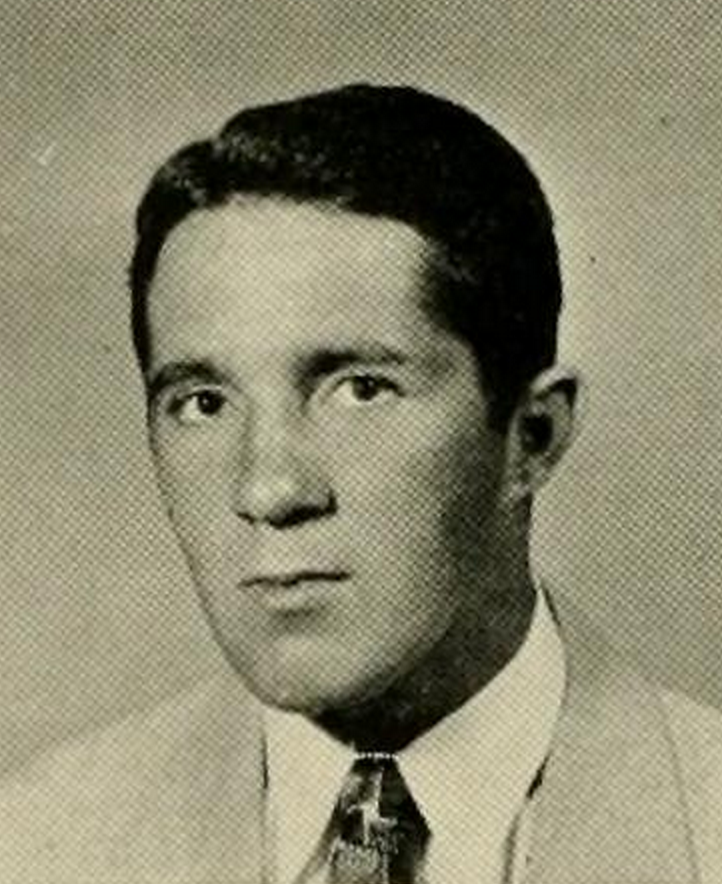
- Renn pictured in Phi Psi Chi 1952, Elon yearbook

Biographical details
- Born: May 31, 1928; Hampton, Virginia, U.S.
- Died: August 23, 2021 (aged 93)
- Education: Elon University

Coaching career (HC unless noted)
- 1967–1968: Apprentice

Head coaching record
- Overall: 5–8–2

William S. Renn Jr. (May 31, 1928 – August 23, 2021) was an American football coach. He was the 23rd head football coach at The Apprentice School in Newport News, Virginia and he held that position for two seasons, from 1967 until 1968. His coaching record at Apprentice was 5–8–2. Renn died from Alzheimer's disease on August 23, 2021, at the age of 93.
