= Vicente Rodríguez (politician) =

Paraguayan politician (1959–2021)

Vicente Rodríguez (1959 – 1 August 2021) was a Paraguayan politician who served as a Deputy from 2018 until his death in 2021, and before then as Governor of San Pedro from 2013 to 2018.
