= Antônio Câmara =

Brazilian politician (died 2021)

Antônio Câmara (1937/8 – 25 August 2021) was a Brazilian politician who served as a Deputy at both state and federal levels.
