= 2021 in China =

- Decades: 2000s; 2010s; 2020s
- See also: Other events of 2021; History of China • Timeline • Years

In 2021, China continued to address the COVID-19 pandemic in the country with a Zero-COVID policy that significantly reduced transmission through large scale lockdowns and testing. The Convidecia and Sinopharm vaccines were approved for general use in China in February 2021. China achieved a record number of 55 space missions in 2021, including the development of the Tiangong space station and the first Chinese craft to land on Mars. Concerns about declining birth rates caused the national government to replace its two-child policy with a three-child policy in May 2021. In the Chinese zodiac, 2021 was the year of the Ox and associated with the wuxing element of metal.

Long standing territorial disputes continued in China. Territorial disputes in the South China Sea led to a diplomatic incident with the Philippines in April 2021. Disputes over the recognition of Taiwan included the possibility of Lithuanian recognition of Taiwan, leading to a diplomatic crisis in August 2021. Other diplomatic disputes included the East China Sea EEZ disputes, skirmishes with India along the China–India border, and the continuing trade war with the United States. China strengthened its relations with Afghanistan, Iran, and Russia in 2021.

A wave of political reforms continued in 2021, applying restrictions or bans to cryptocurrency, skyscrapers, private tutoring, celebrity gossip, and video games. Tech companies were placed under increased scrutiny by the Chinese government in 2021. Anti-monopoly measures were carried out, and several major companies saw significant penalties throughout the year. A property sector crisis affecting companies such as the Evergrande Group in 2021 prompted economic troubles in China. Political reforms in Hong Kong restricted democracy and limited elections to candidates approved by the Chinese Communist Party. Pro-democracy newspapers and groups in Hong Kong were also shut down. Alleged human rights abuses in Xinjiang continued, including accusations of genocide.

== Incumbents ==
- General Secretary of the Chinese Communist Party – Xi Jinping
- President – Xi Jinping
- Vice President – Wang Qishan
- Premier – Li Keqiang
- Congress chairman – Li Zhanshu
- Consultative Conference chairman – Wang Yang
- Supervision Commission director – Yang Xiaodu

=== Communist Party secretaries ===
Post	Name
Secretary of the Beijing Municipal Communist Party Committee	Cai Qi
Secretary of the Tianjin Municipal Communist Party Committee	Li Hongzhong
Secretary of the Shanghai Municipal Communist Party Committee	Li Qiang
Secretary of the Chongqing Municipal Communist Party Committee	Chen Min'er
Secretary of the Anhui Province Communist Party Committee	Li Jinbin; Zheng Shanjie
Secretary of the Fujian Province Communist Party Committee	Yin Li
Secretary of the Gansu Province Communist Party Committee	Lin Duo; Yin Hong
Secretary of the Guangdong Province Communist Party Committee	Li Xi
Secretary of the Guizhou Province Communist Party Committee	Shen Yiqin
Secretary of the Hainan Province Communist Party Committee	Shen Xiaoming
Secretary of the Hebei Province Communist Party Committee	Wang Dongfeng
Secretary of the Heilongjiang Province Communist Party Committee	Zhang Qingwei; Xu Qin
Secretary of the Henan Province Communist Party Committee	Wang Guosheng; Lou Yangsheng
Secretary of the Hubei Province Communist Party Committee	Ying Yong
Secretary of the Hunan Province Communist Party Committee	Xu Dazhe; Zhang Qingwei
Secretary of the Jiangsu Province Communist Party Committee	Lou Qinjian; Wu Zhenglong
Secretary of the Jiangxi Province Communist Party Committee	Liu Qi; Yi Lianhong
Secretary of the Jilin Province Communist Party Committee	Jing Junhai
Secretary of the Liaoning Province Communist Party Committee	Zhang Guoqing
Secretary of the Qinghai Province Communist Party Committee	Wang Jianjun
Secretary of the Shaanxi Province Communist Party Committee	Liu Guozhong
Secretary of the Shandong Province Communist Party Committee	Liu Jiayi; Li Ganjie
Secretary of the Shanxi Province Communist Party Committee	Lou Yangsheng; Lin Wu
Secretary of the Sichuan Province Communist Party Committee	Peng Qinghua
Secretary of the Yunnan Province Communist Party Committee	Ruan Chengfa; Wang Ning
Secretary of the Zhejiang Province Communist Party Committee	Yuan Jiajun
Secretary of the Inner Mongolia Autonomous Region Communist Party Committee	Shi Taifeng
Secretary of the Guangxi Autonomous Region Communist Party Committee	Lu Xinshe; Liu Ning
Secretary of the Tibet Autonomous Region Communist Party Committee	Wu Yingjie; Wang Junzheng
Secretary of the Ningxia Autonomous Region Communist Party Committee	Chen Run'er
Secretary of the Xinjiang Autonomous Region Communist Party Committee	Chen Quanguo

=== Governors ===
Post	Name
Governor of Anhui Province	Li Guoying (until 1 February); Wang Qingxian (from 1 February)
Governor of Fujian Province	Wang Ning
Governor of Gansu Province	TBA
Governor of Guangdong Province	Ma Xingrui
Governor of Guizhou Province	Li Bingjun
Governor of Hainan Province	Feng Fei
Governor of Hebei Province	Xu Qin
Governor of Heilongjiang Province	Hu Changsheng
Governor of Henan Province	Yin Hong (until 31 March); Wang Kai (from 31 March)
Governor of Hubei Province	Wang Xiaodong (until 7 May); Wang Zhonglin (from 7 May)
Governor of Hunan Province	Mao Weiming
Governor of Jiangsu Province	Wu Zhenglong
Governor of Jiangxi Province	Wu Zhenglong
Governor of Jilin Province	Han Jun
Governor of Liaoning Province	Liu Ning
Governor of Qinghai Province	Xin Changxing
Governor of Shaanxi Province	Zhao Yide
Governor of Shandong Province	N/A
Governor of Shanxi Province	Lin Wu (until June); Lan Foan (starting June)
Governor of Sichuan Province	Huang Qiang
Governor of Yunnan Province	Chen Hao
Governor of Zhejiang Province	Zheng Shanjie (until 30 September); Wang Hao (starting 30 September)

== Ongoing ==
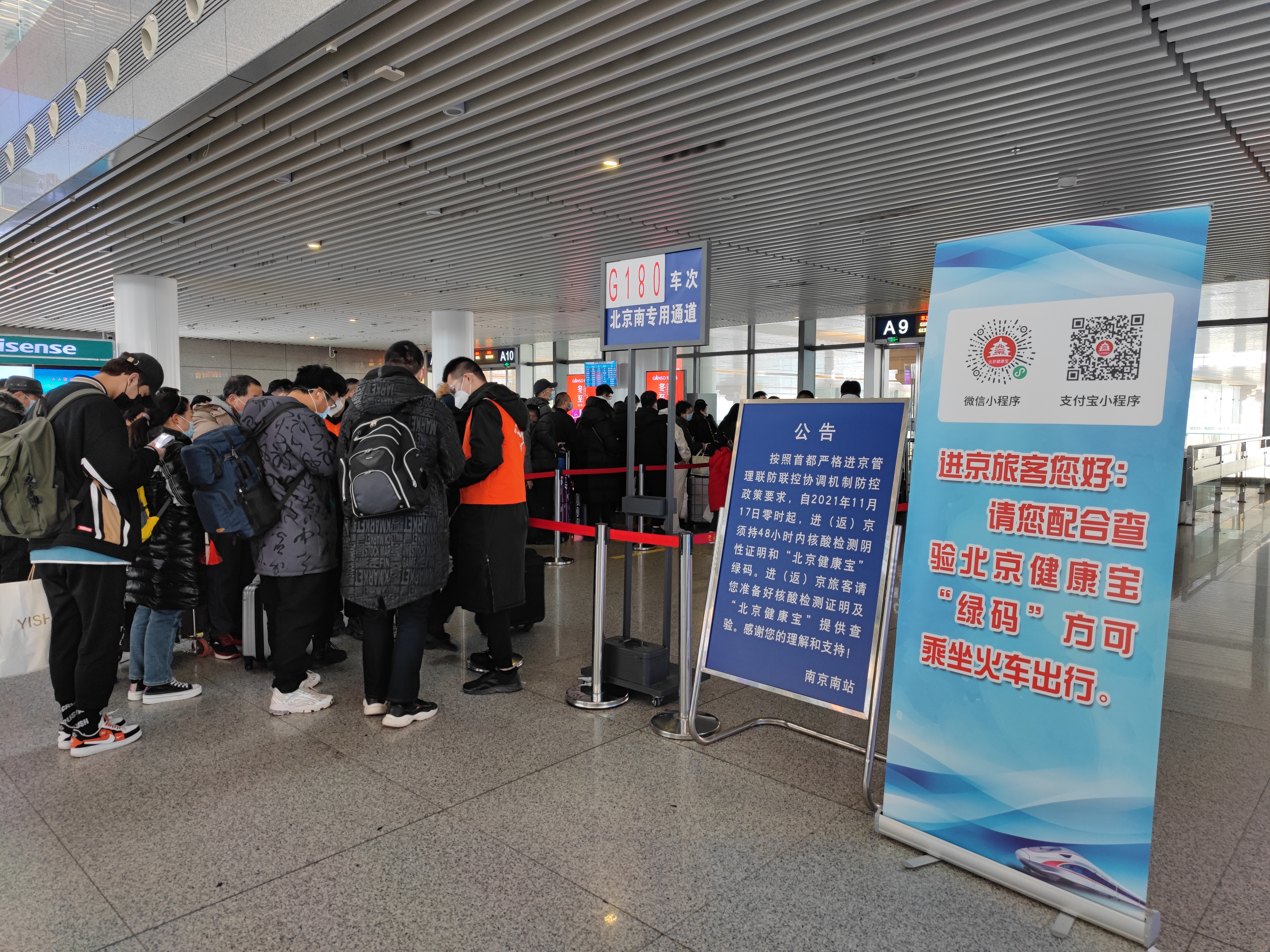
A COVID-19 health checkpoint in Nanjing South railway station on 18 December 2021

- 2020–2021 China–India skirmishes
- 2020–2021 Xi Jinping Administration reform spree
- 2020–2022 Chinese property sector crisis
- 2021 Hong Kong electoral changes
  - 2021 arrests of Hong Kong pro-democracy figures
- Anti-China terrorism in Pakistan
- Chinese elephants expedition
- COVID-19 pandemic in China
  - Chinese government response to COVID-19
- East China Sea EEZ disputes
- Tang ping
- Territorial disputes in the South China Sea

== Events ==
=== January ===
- 1 January – Amendments to the National Defence Law take effect, transferring military powers from the State Council to the Central Military Commission, effectively giving Xi Jinping control over the military.
- 5 January
  - COVID-19 pandemic: The team sent by the World Health Organization to study the origins of the coronavirus pandemic virus is blocked from entering China. The team claims their visas had not been approved yet. Tedros Adhanom expressed his dismay, saying he had been in contact with senior Chinese officials, and how important the expedition was.
  - Lai Xiaomin, former chairman of the China Huarong Asset Management, is sentenced to death for collecting bribes.
- 6 January – COVID-19 pandemic: 11 million people are locked down in Shijiazhuang due to a COVID-19 outbreak.
- 10 January – An explosion triggers a mining accident in Qixia, Shandong.
- 11 January – COVID-19 pandemic: 13 members of the 15 member World Health Organization team sent to study the origins of COVID-19 arrive in Wuhan, China. The last two members are awaiting in Singapore for their COVID-19 test results.
- 14 January – COVID-19 pandemic: The first recorded death from COVID-19 since May 2020 is reported in Hebei.
- 20 January – 2020–2021 China–India skirmishes: Chinese forces clash with Indian forces in Naku La.
- 22 January – East China Sea EEZ disputes: China passes a law authorizing the China Coast Guard to fire on foreign vessels in the East China Sea.
- 30 January – The Hualong One nuclear reactor begins commercial operation.

=== February ===
- 2 February – ByteDance files a lawsuit against Tencent for monopolistic practices.
- 6 February – COVID-19 pandemic: China approves the CoronaVac vaccine for general use.
- 7 February – China issues stricter anti-monopoly regulations to regulate internet platforms.
- 8 February – Clubhouse is blocked in China after increasing in popularity.
- 10 February – The Tianwen-1 orbiter and rover is inserted into orbit.
- 11 February – The CCTV New Year's Gala attracts international controversy for the use of blackface.
- 15 February – A series of attacks are carried out on Chinese-owned factories in Myanmar as part of the 2021–2022 Myanmar protests.
- 20 February – 2020–2021 China–India skirmishes: Chinese and Indian forces complete a withdraw from Pangong Tso after a months-long standoff.
- 22 February – The Parliament of Canada votes to recognize the Chinese persecution of Uyghurs as a genocide, becoming the second country to do so.
- 25 February
  - COVID-19 pandemic: China approves the Convidecia and Sinopharm vaccines for general use.
  - The States General of the Netherlands votes to recognize the Chinese persecution of Uyghurs as a genocide.

=== March ===
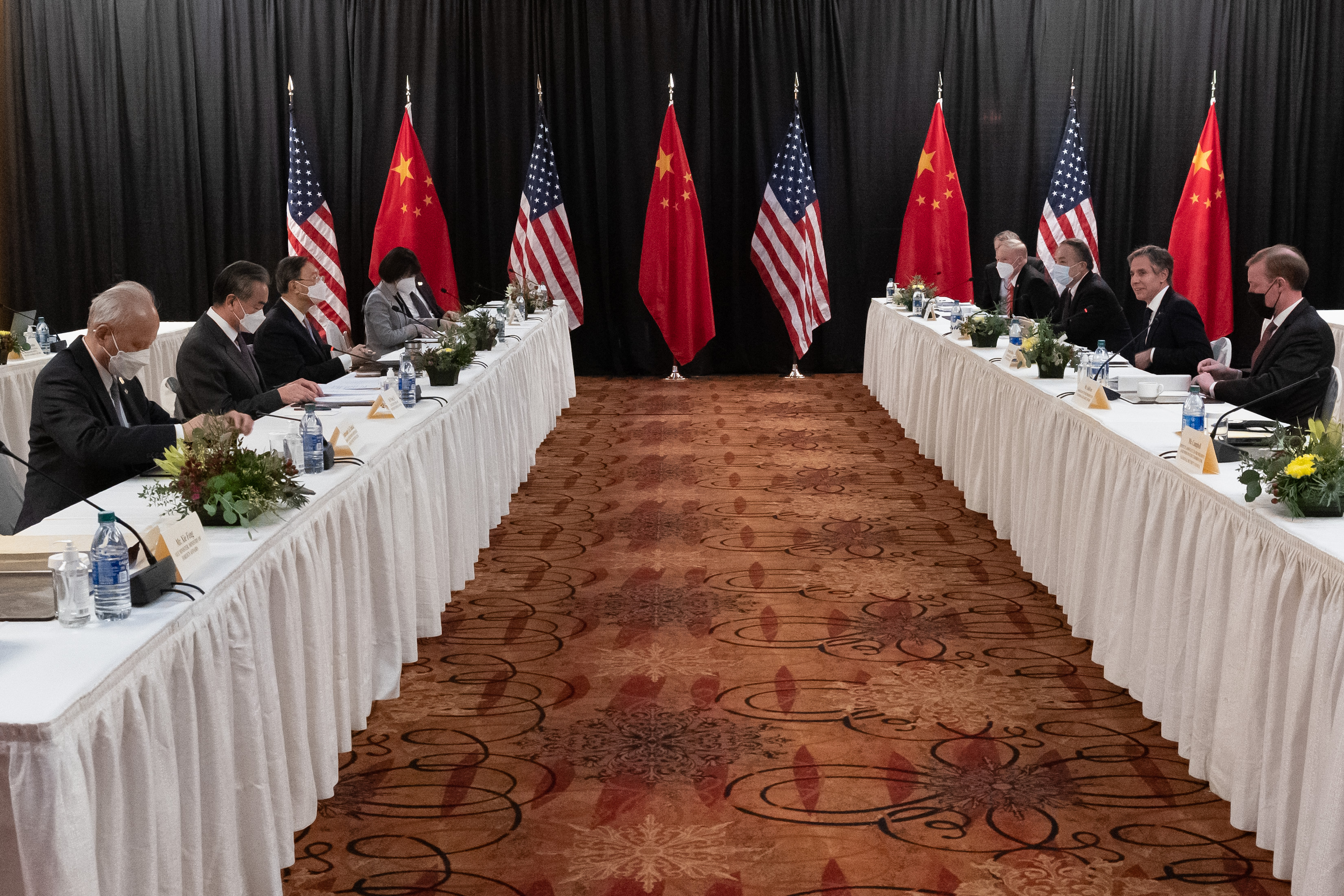
Chinese and American delegates at the United States–China talks in Alaska

- 5 March – The 2021 National People's Congress begins.
- 8 March – Several Chinese companies file a government-backed lawsuit against Adrian Zenz for his investigation of the persecution of Uyghurs in China.
- 11 March – The Chinese legislature grants a committee the power to choose which candidates are eligible for elections in Hong Kong.
- 15 March – Beijing is covered by the 2021 East Asia sandstorm.
- 17 March – The European Union declares its first sanctions against China since 1989 in response to China's persecution of Uyghurs.
- 18 March – The United States–China talks in Alaska are held.
- 20 March – The recovery of hundreds of artifacts from a Sanxingdui dig site is announced.
- 22 March
  - A suicide bombing occurs at a government land use office in Guangzhou.
  - A diplomatic incident takes places between China and the Philippines when China stations hundreds of ships off the coast of Whitsun Reef.
- 27 March – China and Iran sign a 25-year Cooperation Program.

=== April ===
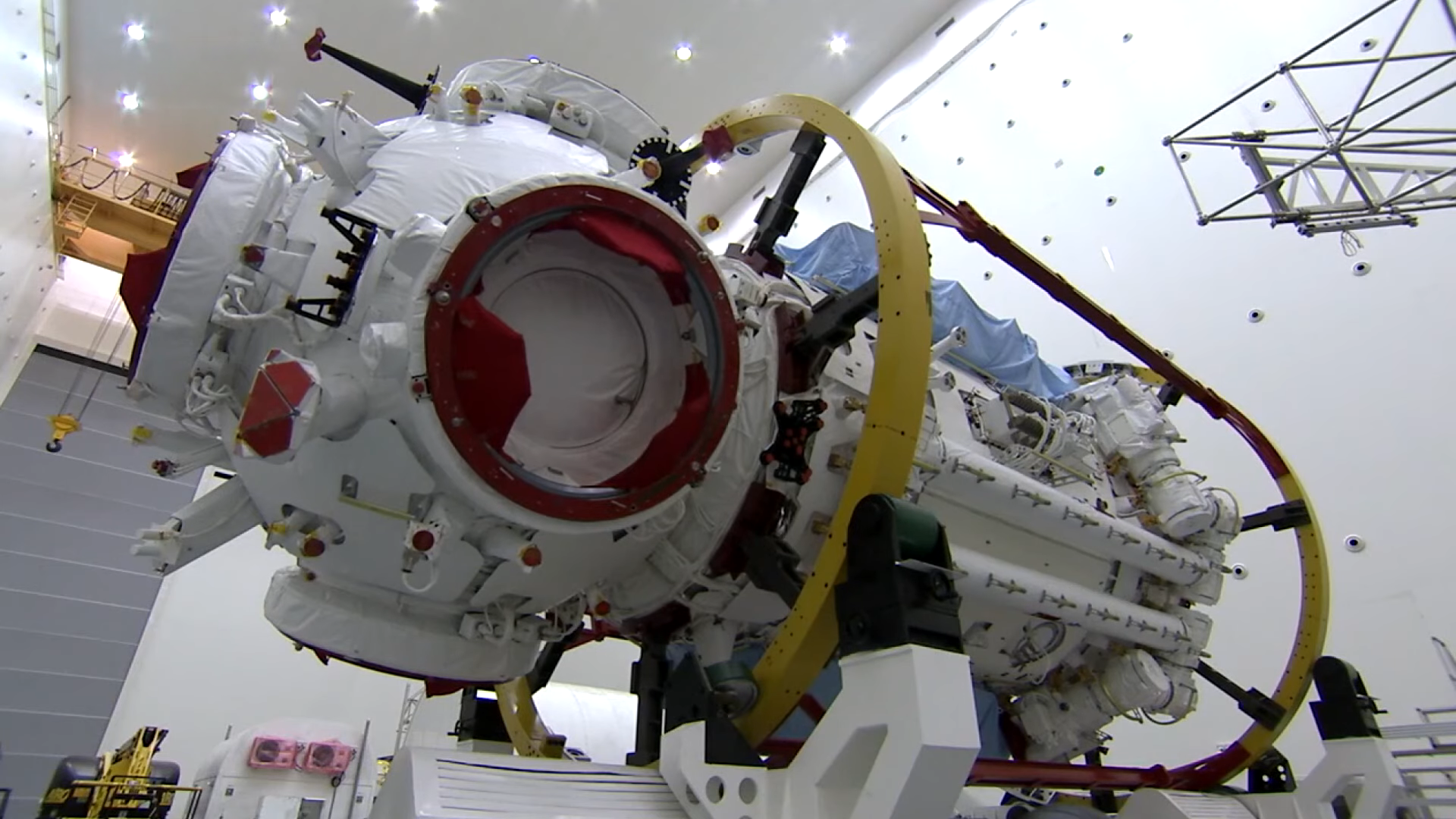
The Tianhe core module prior to launch

- 6 April – 2020–2021 China–India skirmishes: The Tibet Autonomous Region introduces 15 regulations on the border with India to limit entry.
- 10 April – Alibaba Group is fined 18 billion yuan ($2.75 billion USD).
- 11 April – COVID-19 pandemic: China ends the mandatory vaccination policy of several localities amid vaccine hesitancy.
- 27 April – An oil spill takes place off the coast of Qingdao.
- 29 April – The Tianhe core module is launched into space as the first component of the Tiangong space station.

=== May ===
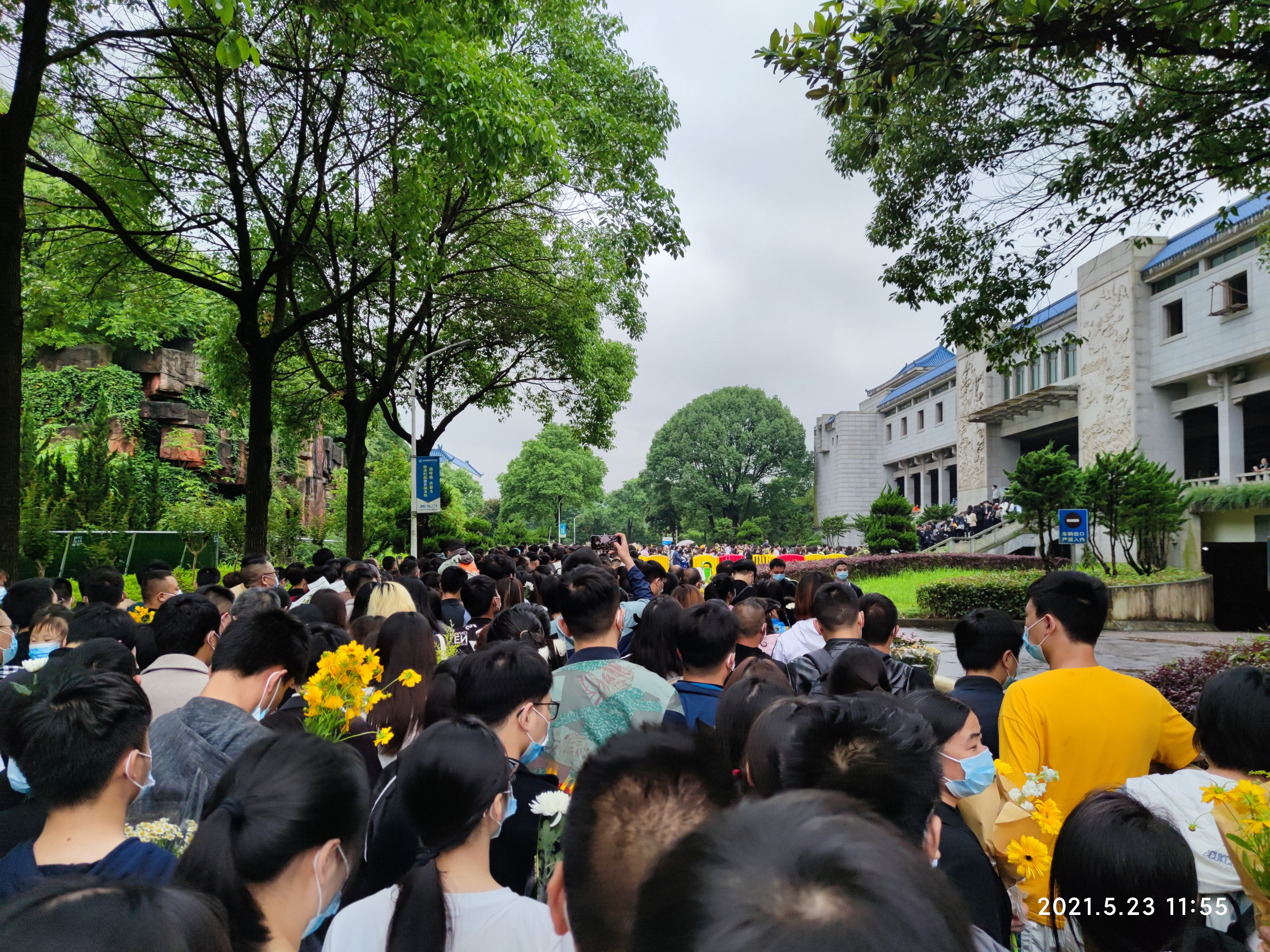
Crowds at the funeral of Yuan Longping

- 8 May – The rocket body from the Tianhe launch plunges into the ocean, prompting international concerns about safety measures for returning spacecraft.
- 9 May – China deletes two million posts from the internet for their discussion of Chinese history.
- 14 May
  - The Zhurong rover is the first Chinese craft to successfully land on Mars.
  - Tornadoes form in Wuhan and Shengze, killing 12 people.
- 19 May – China bans the use or transfer of cryptocurrencies by banks, prompting Bitcoin to decline in value by nearly 30 percent.
- 20 May – Chinese industry sees significant economic turn down after China announces price controls on raw materials.
- 21 May – A 6.4 magnitude earthquake occurs in Yunnan Province.
- 22 May
  - 21 runners die from hypothermia in the Gansu ultramarathon disaster.
  - A 7.4 magnitude earthquake occurs in Qinghai.
  - The Zhurong rover successfully deploys on Mars.
- 24 May – The funeral of Yuan Longping is attended by thousands of people.
- 25 May – Thousands are evacuated in Shenzhen after SEG Plaza begins wobbling without apparent cause.
- 29 May – The Tianzhou 2 is launched into space and it docks with the Tiangong space station.
- 31 May – China replaces the two-child policy with the three-child policy to account for population decline.

=== June ===
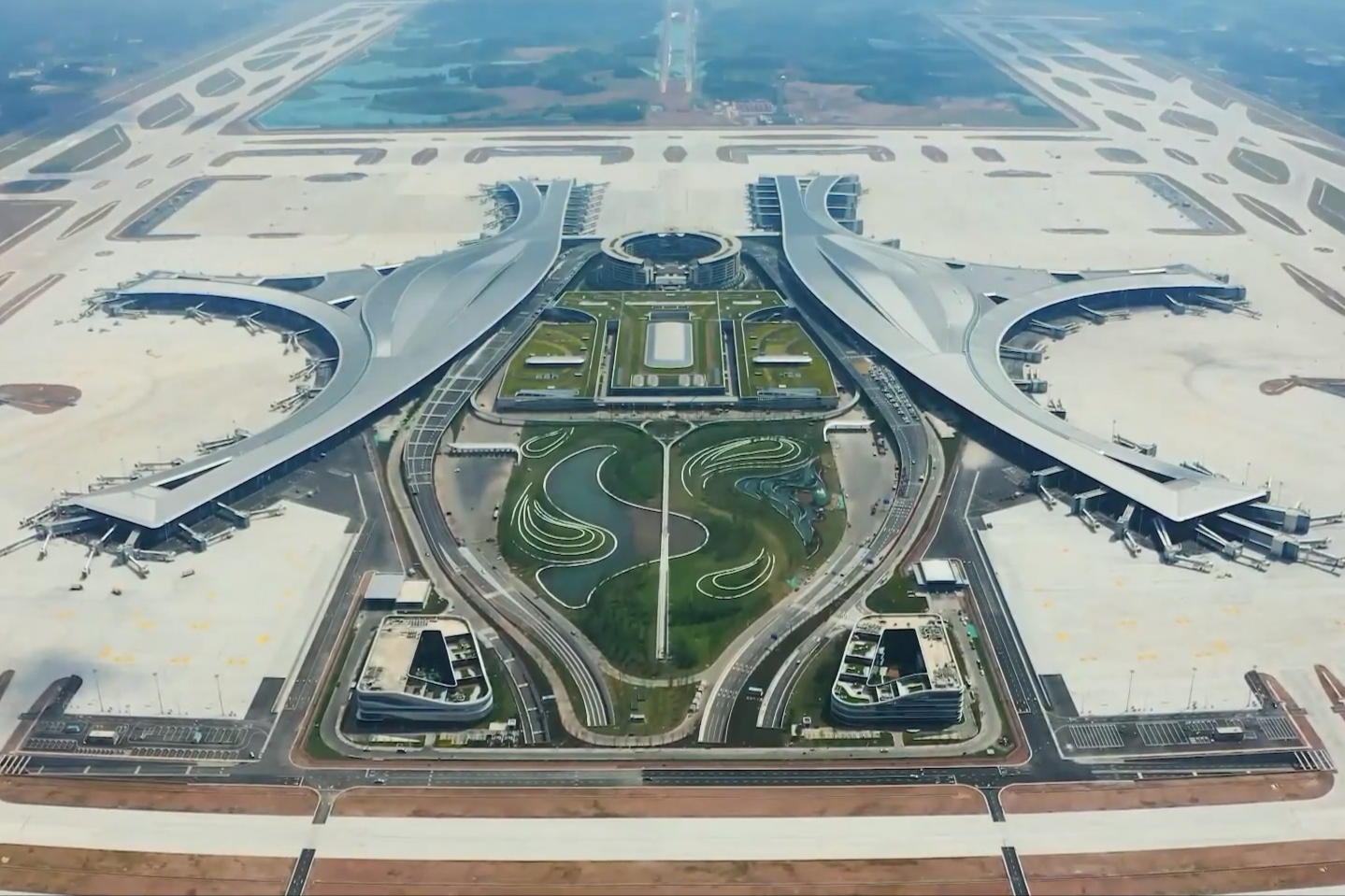
The Chengdu Tianfu International Airport in 2021

- 1 June – The first human case of influenza A virus subtype H10N3 is documented in Jiangsu.
- 2 June – The June 4th Museum honoring the victims of the Tiananmen Square massacre is closed following a probe into its licensing status.
- 4 June – COVID-19 pandemic: The Sinovac vaccine is authorized for emergency use in children.
- 5 June – A man kills six people with a knife in Anqing.
- 10 June – The Data Security Law of the People's Republic of China is enacted to regulate data collection by Chinese tech companies.
- 13 June – A gas line explodes at a vegetable market in Shiyan, killing 25 people.
- 17 June
  - Shenzhou 12 carries Nie Haisheng, Liu Boming, and Tang Hongbo to the Tiangong space station.
  - The offices of the Apple Daily are raided and its assets are frozen.
- 25 June – A fire kills 18 students at a boarding school in Zhecheng County.
- 27 June – Chengdu Tianfu International Airport begins operation.
- 28 June – The Baihetan Dam begins generating hydroelectricity.
- 30 June – WHO declares China to be malaria-free after four years without an indigenous case.

=== July ===
News report of flooding in Zhengzhou, Henan

- July – The province of Henan experiences heavy flooding, killing hundreds.
- July–August – China participates in the 2020 Summer Olympics. It wins the second most gold medals with 39, but Chinese state media claims victory by adding the totals of Taiwan and Hong Kong to its own.
- 1 July – Celebrations are held for the 100th Anniversary of the Chinese Communist Party.
- 5 July – Suning.com announces a bailout deal with the Jiangsu government and several other major corporations.
- 6 July
  - China hosts the CPC and World Political Parties Summit.
  - The National Development and Reform Commission bans the construction of skyscrapers taller than 500 metres (1,600 ft).
- 7 July – Chinese conservation officials upgrade the conservation status of giant pandas from endangered to vulnerable.
- 10 July – China blocks the merger of Huya Live and DouYu under Tencent.
- 12 July – The Siji Kaiyuan Hotel collapses, killing 17 people.
- 13 July – Construction begins on Linglong One at the Changjiang Nuclear Power Plant, China's first small modular reactor.
- 19 July – Zhang Tao, chairman of China Aerospace International Holdings, is arrested and expelled from the company and the Communist Party for assaulting two senior scientists the previous month.
- 20 July – Typhoon Cempaka makes landfall in Guangdong.
- 24 July
  - China blocks Tencent from making exclusive music copyright agreements.
  - China announces a ban on private tutoring.
- 25 July – Typhoon In-fa makes landfall in China.
- 27 July – China conducts its first test of a Fractional Orbital Bombardment System, including the use of a Hypersonic Glide Vehicle.
- 31 July – Singer Kris Wu is taken into custody in Beijing on suspicion of rape.

=== August ===
- 1 August – COVID-19 pandemic: Millions of people in Beijing and other cities go into lockdown amid a COVID-19 outbreak.
- 10 August – China severs diplomatic relations with Lithuania in response to the establishment of a Lithuanian embassy in Taiwan.
- 15 August – The Hong Kong rights group Civil Human Rights Front disbands.
- 20 August – The Personal Information Protection Law of the People's Republic of China is enacted.
- 23 August – The discovery of Bianchengichthys is reported following the excavation of its fossils.
- 23–24 August – COVID-19 pandemic: Thousands of people in Ruili are evacuated to Mangshi for a 14-day quarantine.
- 24 August – The Ministry of Education establishes new guidelines requiring Xi Jinping Thought to be taught in schools.
- 26 August – Dong Hong, former corruption investigator at the Central Commission for Discipline Inspection, is put on trial for accepting bribes.
- 27 August – China establishes regulations on fan culture on the internet, including a ban on celebrity gossip. All content relating to actress Zhao Wei is removed from Chinese internet.
- 30 August – China bans children from accessing online video games outside of a designated periods that add up to three hours each week.

=== September ===
A sign outside the 2021 National Games of China

- September
  - 2020–2022 Chinese property sector crisis: The Evergrande Group goes into a debt crisis that affects the broader Chinese economy.
  - The 2021 National Games of China are held.
  - Activists Huang Xueqin and Wang Jianbing are detained in Guangzhou.
- 2 September – The National Radio and Television Administration bans the portrayal of effeminate men in media.
- 8 September – Francis Cui Qingqi is appointed as the bishop of Wuhan after an agreement between China and the Vatican.
- 12 September – The 2021 Macanese legislative election is held, with most pro-democracy candidates declared ineligible by the Chinese government.
- 14 September – The Haidian District People's Court dismisses the sexual harassment case by Zhou Xiaoxuan against Zhu Jun.
- 16 September – A 6.0 magnitude earthquake occurs in Lu County, killing three people.
- 17 September – China applies to join the CPTPP.
- 19 September – The 2021 Hong Kong Election Committee Subsector elections are held with eligible candidates pre-approved by the Chinese government.
- 20 September
  - The unmanned Tianzhou 3 spacecraft launches to resupply the Tiangong space station.
  - Universal Studios Beijing opens to the public.
- 22 September – Harbin goes into partial lockdown following an outbreak of COVID-19.
- 25 September
  - Meng Wanzhou returns to China after being released by the United States and Canada in exchange for Michael Spavor and Michael Kovrig.
  - The Hong Kong Alliance in Support of Patriotic Democratic Movements of China votes to dissolve itself.

=== October ===
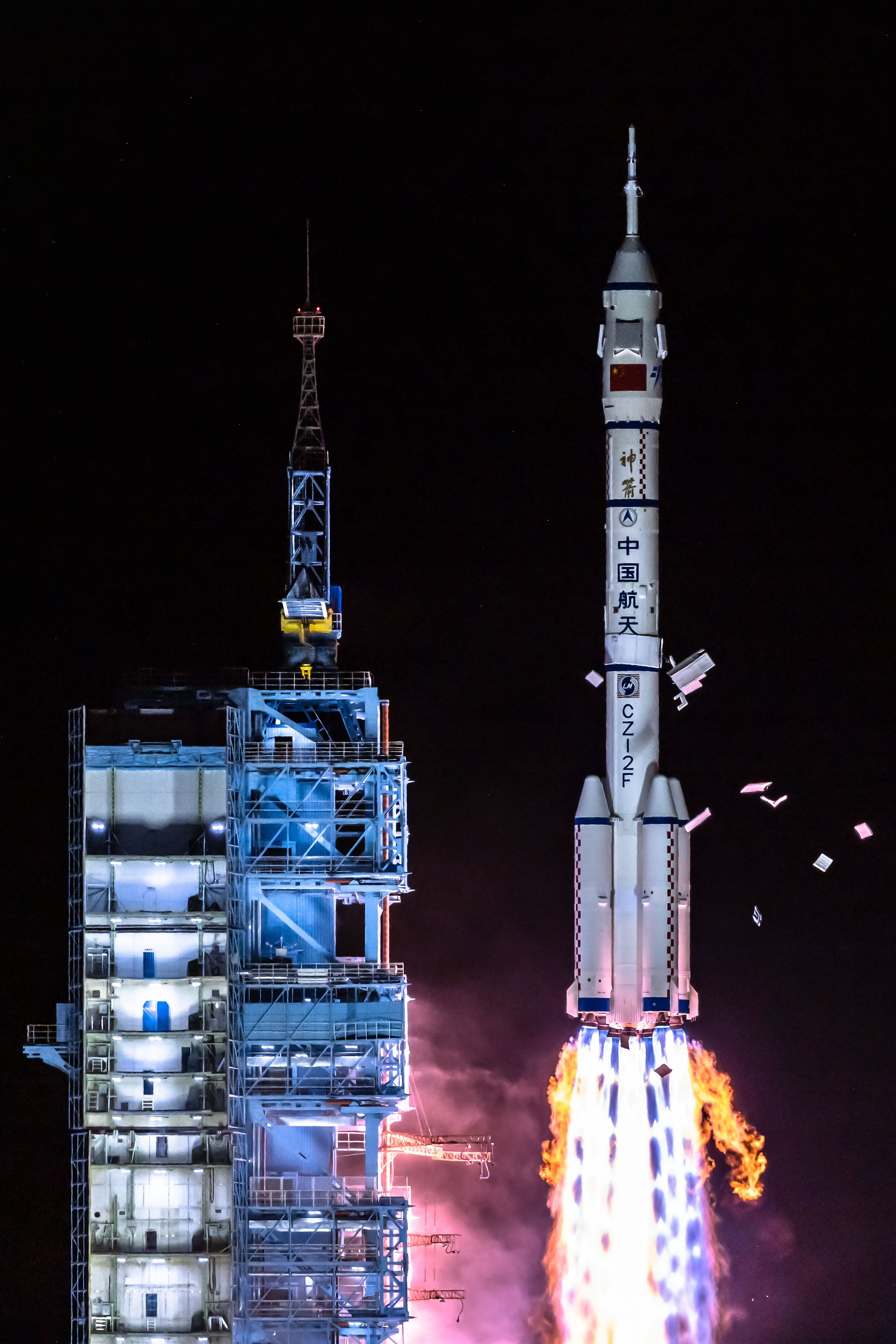
Shenzhou 13 launches on a Long March 2F rocket from Jiuquan Satellite Launch Center

- 2 October – Former justice minister Fu Zhenghua is detained for violating party discipline.
- 12 October – The National Development and Reform Commission announces that energy in China will be distributed through a market economy after government price controls lead to an energy crisis.
- 14 October
  - Chinese H-alpha Solar Explorer, the first Chinese solar observation satellite, is launched.
  - The 2021 CS Asian Open Figure Skating Trophy is held in Beijing.
- 15 October – Shenzhou 13 carries Wang Yaping, Zhai Zhigang, and Ye Guangfu to the Tiangong space station.
- 20 October
  - The Cyberspace Administration of China delists Caixin as an official news outlet.
  - The Olympic flame arrives in Beijing for the 2022 Winter Olympics.
- 26 October
  - COVID-19 pandemic: Six COVID-19 cases prompt Lanzhou to go into lockdown.
  - 2020–2022 Chinese property sector crisis: Modern Land defaults on a bond payment, exacerbating the sector's debt crisis.

=== November ===
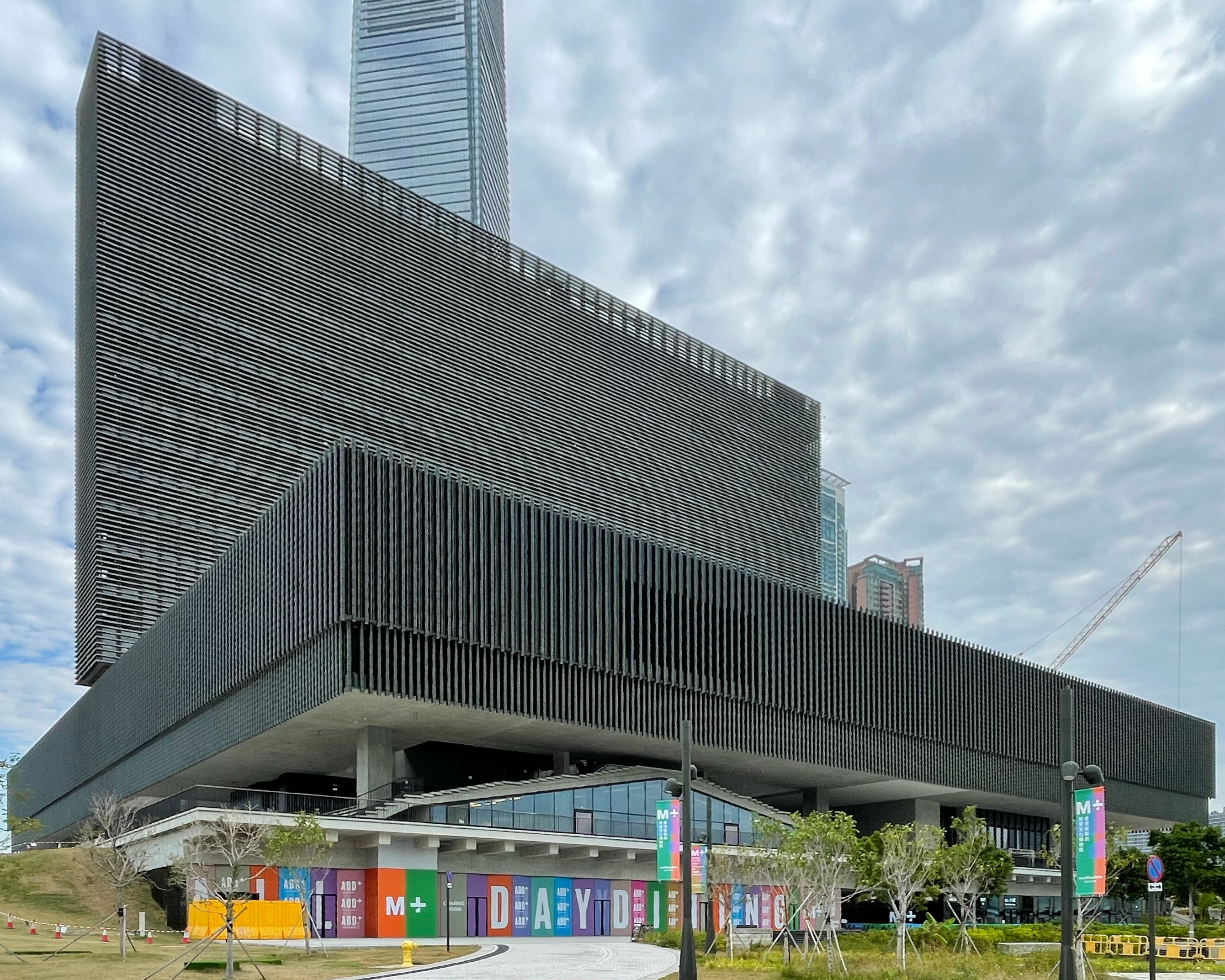
The M+ art museum in Hong Kong

- 2 November – Tennis player Peng Shuai makes allegations of sexual assault against Zhang Gaoli, former Vice Premier of China and a high-ranking official of the Chinese Communist Party.
- 5 November – Former Vice Minister of Public Security Sun Lijun is arrested on charges of accepting bribes.
- 11 November – The Central Committee of the Chinese Communist Party recognizes Xi Jinping as a major historical figure in the Sixth Plenum and adopts the Resolution on the Major Achievements and Historical Experience of the Party over the Past Century.
- 12 November – The M+ art museum opens in Hong Kong to scrutiny amid increased censorship in the city.
- 21 November – Darryl O'Young wins the 2021 Macau Grand Prix.

=== December ===
- 1 December
  - COVID-19 pandemic: 13 million people are put under lockdown in Xi'an after 52 cases are discovered in a COVID-19 outbreak.
  - The Women's Tennis Association suspends all games in China in response to the treatment of tennis player Peng Shuai.
- 3 December
  - The Nasdaq Golden Dragon China Index falls by 9.1 percent, the largest fall since 2008.
  - Chinese Olympic medalists perform in a goodwill tour in Hong Kong.
- 4 December – China hosts the International Democracy Forum after it is not invited to the Summit for Democracy.
- 13 December – COVID-19 pandemic: The first case of SARS-CoV-2 Omicron variant in mainland China is documented in Tianjin.
- 19 December – The 2021 Hong Kong legislative election takes places with candidates pre-selected by the Chinese Communist Party.
- 20 December – The People's Bank of China cuts its main interest rate for the first time in 20 months.
- 21 December – The discovery of a fossilized dinosaur embryo in China is reported.
- 26 December – The Ziyuan I-02E satellite is sent into orbit.
- 29 December – Stand News is shut down after its editors are arrested and its assets are frozen.

== Deaths ==
=== January–March ===
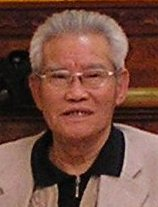
Peng Shilu

- 1 January – Sun Qiaolu, 25, actress.
- 5 January – Joseph Zong Huaide, 100, bishop of Sanyuan.
- 8 January – Xu Qinxian, 85, major general of the People's Liberation Army.
- 28 January – Wang Shouguan, 98, astronomer.
- 29 January – Lai Xiaomin, 58, economist.
- 5 February – Shen Zhonghou, 92, engineer.
- 7 February – Cheng Rongshi, 93, physical chemist.
- 19 February – Liu Fusheng, 89, politician.
- 22 February – Liu Zhongshan, 92, lieutenant general of the People's Liberation Army.
- 28 February – Mahinur Qasimi, 91, Xinjiang politician.
- 2 March – Zhou Yulin, 98, mathematician.
- 6 March – Chi Shangbin, 71, football player.
- 13 March
  - Zhou Youyuan, 82, astrophysicist.
  - Wang Fuchun, 79, photographer.
- 22 March – Peng Shilu, 95, nuclear engineer.
- 26 March – Shen Shanjiong, 103, microbiologist.
- 27 March – Xie Yuyuan, 96, pharmaceutical chemist.
- 31 March – Li Jingwen, 88, economist.

=== April–June ===
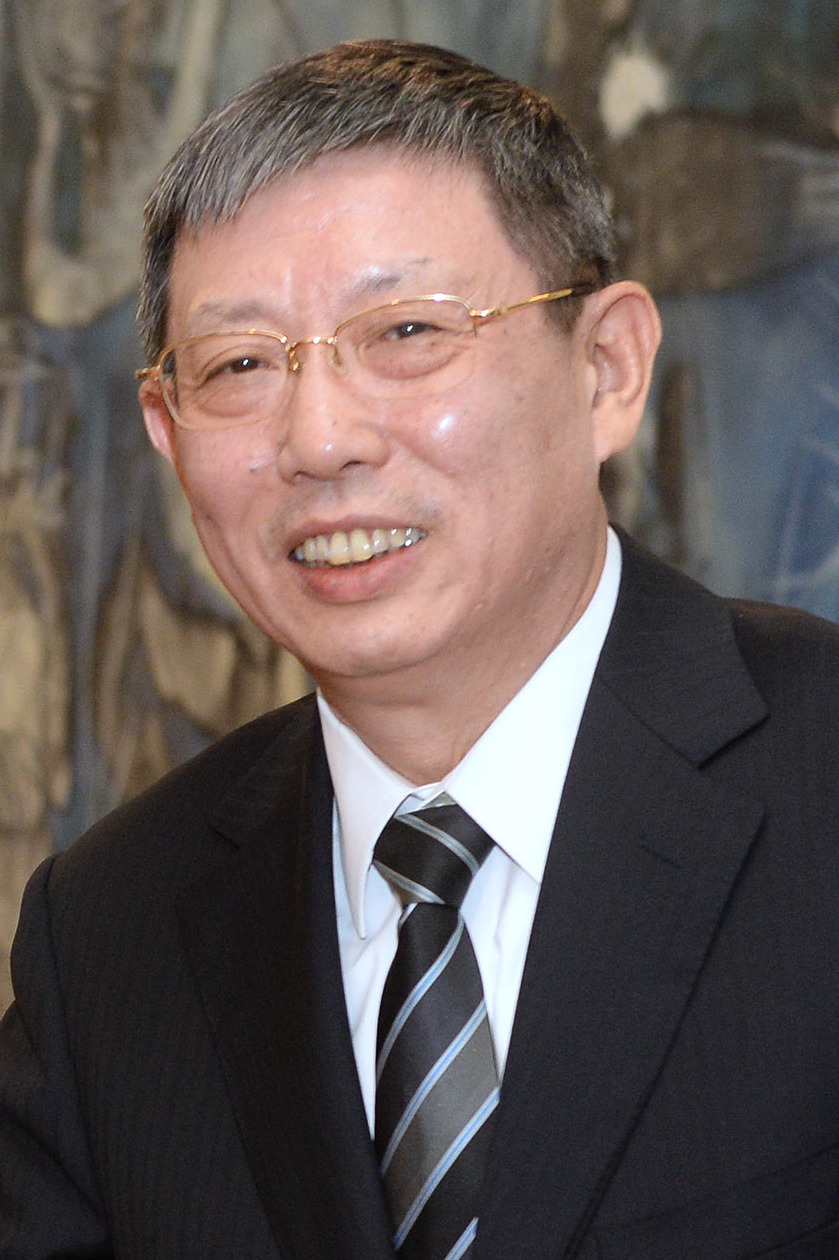
Yang Xiong

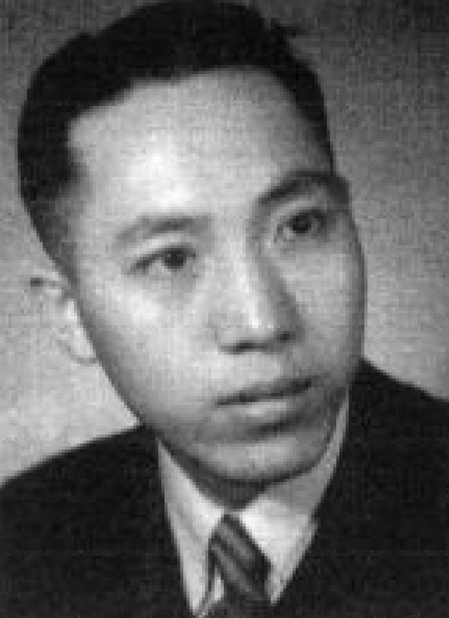
Wu Mengchao

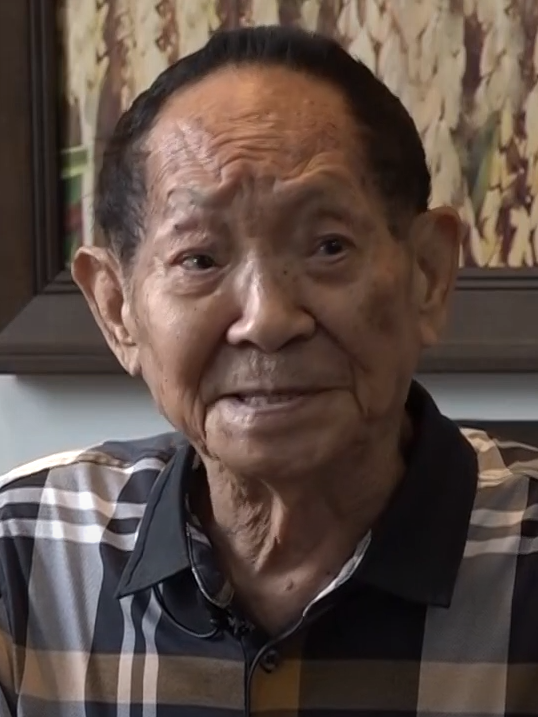
Yuan Longping

- 12 April – Yang Xiong, 67, mayor of Shanghai.
- 23 April – Luo Qingquan, 75, politician.
- 28 April – Min Guirong, 87, thermophysicist.
- 29 April – Zhang Enhua, 48, football player.
- 5 May – Cheng Youshu, 97, diplomat and poet.
- 6 May – Liu Xingtu, 84, agronomist.
- 14 May – Wang Yuan, 91, mathematician.
- 20 May – Zuo Hui, 50, real estate tycoon.
- 22 May
  - Huang Guanjun, 34, marathon runner.
  - Liang Jing, 31, marathon runner.
  - Wu Mengchao, 98, hepatobiliary surgeon.
  - Yuan Longping, 90, agronomist.
- 26 May
  - Chen Qingru, 94, mineralogist.
  - Ren Farong, 84, Taoist priest.
- 28 May
  - He Zhaowu, 99, historian.
  - Zhang Kaiyuan, 94, historian.
- 7 June – Su Yiran, 102, politician.
- 11 June – Zhang Zuoji, 76, politician.
- 13 June – Su Dongshui, 89, economist.
- 14 June – Chen Shijun, 23, student.
- 16 June – Huang Xiling, 94, geotechnical specialist.
- 17 June – Xu Yuanchong, 100, translator.
- 27 June
  - Gao Shangquan, 92, economist.
  - Jiang Jingshan, 85, aerospace engineer.
- 29 June – Xue Yuqun, 89, hydrogeologist.

=== July–September ===
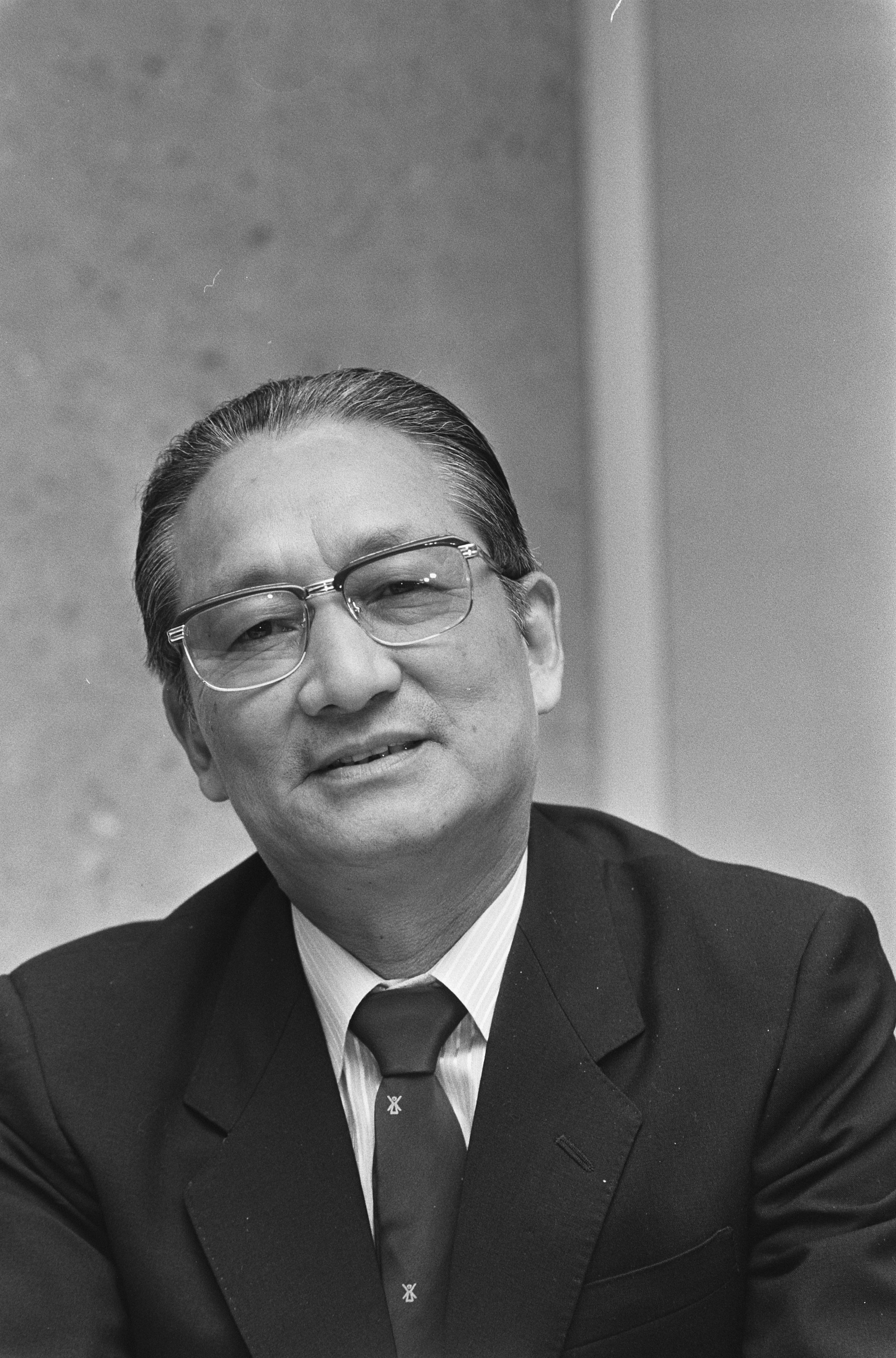
He Kang

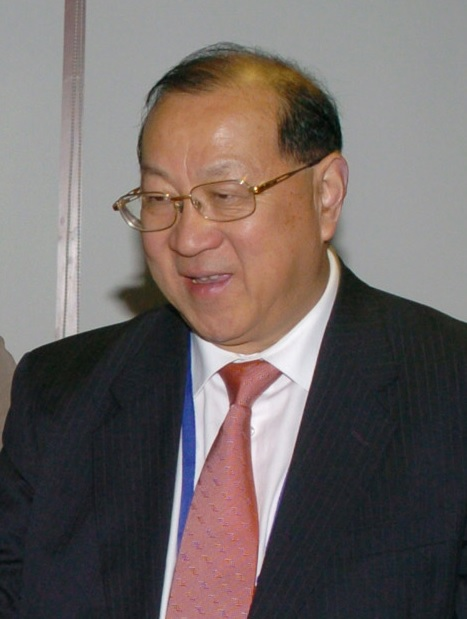
Jin Renqing

- July – He Kang, 98, politician.
- 9 July – Matthew Cao Xiangde, 93, bishop of Zhejiang.
- 12 July – Xu Jingren, 76, businessman.
- 27 July – Wen Shizhen, 81, politician.
- 6 August – Wang Wenjuan, 94, actress.
- 17 August – Guo Jingkun, 87, chemist.
- 25 August – Zheng Zhemin, 96, explosives engineer.
- 28 August
  - Jiang Chunyun, 91, politician.
  - Jin Renqing, 77, politician.
- 31 August – Xu Houze, 87, geodesist.
- 12 September – Guang Gao, 76, computer scientist.
- 22 September – Huang Hongjia, 97, physicist.
- 28 September – Wang Jianmin, 78, full general of the People's Liberation Army.

=== October–December ===
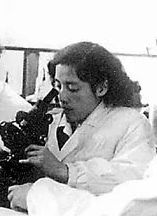
Chen Wenxin

- 1 October
  - Zhang Hanxin, 85, physicist.
  - Zhang Xudong, 58, general of the People's Liberation Army.
- 4 October – Li Zhengming, 90, engineer.
- 5 October – Ye Keming, 84, engineer.
- 7 October – Chen Wenxin, 95, biologist.
- 13 October – Stephen Yang Xiangtai, 98, Bishop of Daming.
- 18 October – Xu Qin, 93, politician.
- 2 November – Li Zehou, 91, philosopher.
- 4 December – Wu Xinzhi, 93, paleoanthropologist.
- 12 December – Tu Men, 61, actor.
- 13 December – Wang Xuezhen, 95, politician.
- 21 December – Chen Niannian, 80, nuclear engineer.
- 31 December – Long Zhiyi, 92, politician.

== See also ==
=== Country overviews ===
- History of China
- History of modern China
- Outline of China
- Government of China
- Politics of China
- Timeline of Chinese history
- Years in China

=== Related timelines for current period ===
- 2021 in politics and government
- 2020s

=== Timelines of Chinese regions ===
- 2021 in Hong Kong
- 2021 in Macau

== Links ==
- Media related to 2021 in China at Wikimedia Commons
