= NGC 7678 =

Galaxy located in the constellation Pegasus

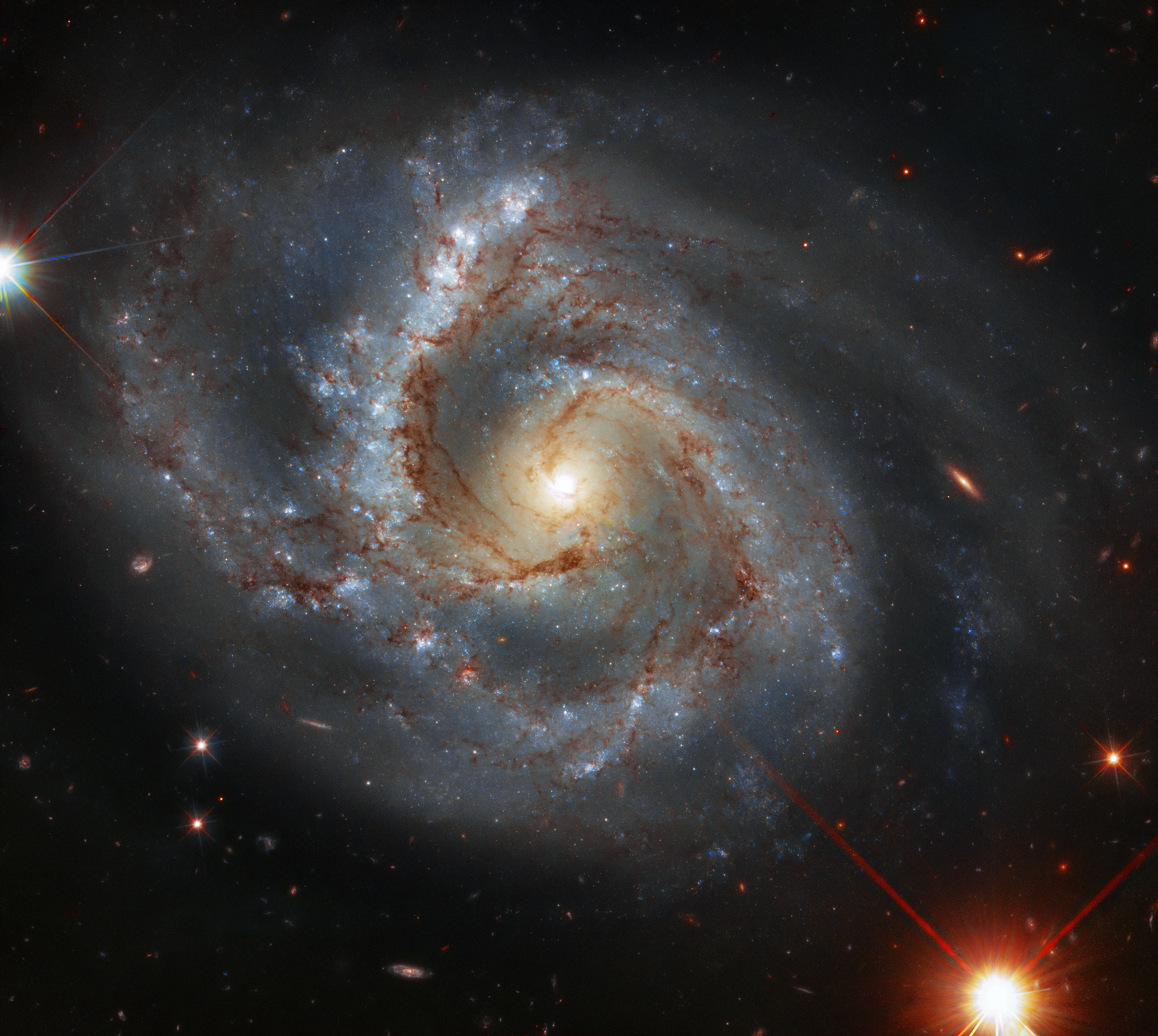
- NGC 7678 imaged by the Hubble Space Telescope

Observation data (J2000 epoch)
- Constellation: Pegasus
- Right ascension: 23^{h} 28^{m} 27.8834^{s}
- Declination: +22° 25′ 16.336″
- Redshift: 0.011638 ± 0.000005
- Heliocentric radial velocity: 3,489 ± 1 km/s
- Distance: 132 ± 34.9 Mly (40.38 ± 10.69 Mpc)
- Group or cluster: NGC 7678 Group (LGG 474)
- Apparent magnitude (V): 11.8

Characteristics
- Type: SAB(rs)c
- Size: ~106,300 ly (32.59 kpc) (estimated)
- Apparent size (V): 2.17′ × 1.67′
- Notable features: Starburst galaxy

Other designations
- IRAS 23259+2208, Arp 28, UGC 12614, MCG +04-55-017, PGC 71534, CGCG 476-045, VV 359

NGC 7678 is an intermediate spiral galaxy located in the constellation Pegasus. It is located at a distance of about 130 million light years from Earth, which, given its apparent dimensions, means that NGC 7678 is about 95,000 light years across. It was discovered by William Herschel on September 15, 1784.

== Characteristics ==
NGC 7678 is a grand design spiral galaxy with two arms, from which the south arm is more prominent, and as a result the galaxy is asymmetrical. It was initially considered to that the asymmetry was the caused by a different galaxy interacting with NGC 7678 but further observations reveal that this is not the case. The galaxy is featured in Arp's Atlas of Peculiar Galaxies as number 28, in the category "One heavy arm".

The galaxy has a small nucleus and a weak bar. The galaxy had been identified based on the spectral emission as a type 2 Seyfert galaxy, but the ratio of [NII]λ 6583/H-alpha indicates it is an HII region or a low-ionization nuclear emission-line region, with the HII region classification being supported by the λ6584/Hα and λ5007/Hβ ratios.

Many large HII regions are visible at the southern arm. Ten giant HII regions have been detected in NGC 7678, with the largest having a mass of 10^{7} M_{☉}. These regions are places of active star formation and contain star clusters. The largest HII region in the southern arm could be the relic of a satellite galaxy that merged with NGC 7678 and caused the starburst activity. The total star formation rate of the galaxy is estimated to be 3.8 M_{☉} per year based on corrected Paα emission or 7.4 M_{☉} per year based on infrared emission.

== Nearby galaxies ==
NGC 7678 is an isolated galaxy in the kiloparsec scale. A. M. Garcia listed the galaxy as the namesake of the NGC 7678 galaxy group (also known as LGG 474). Other members of the group include NGC 7673, NGC 7677, and NGC 7664.

== Supernovae ==
Four supernovae have been observed in NGC 7678:

- SN 1997dc (Type Ib, mag. 18.3) was discovered by the BAO Supernova Survey on 5 August 1997.
- SN 2002dp (Type Ia, mag. 15.1) was discovered by Alain Klotz on 18 June 2002.
- SN 2009ga (Type II-P, mag. 16.2) was discovered by Kōichi Itagaki on 9 June 2009.
- SN 2021qvr (Type II, mag. 17.707) was discovered by ATLAS on 22 June 2021.

== See also ==
- List of NGC objects (7001–7840)
