= NGC 664 =

Galaxy in the constellation Pisces

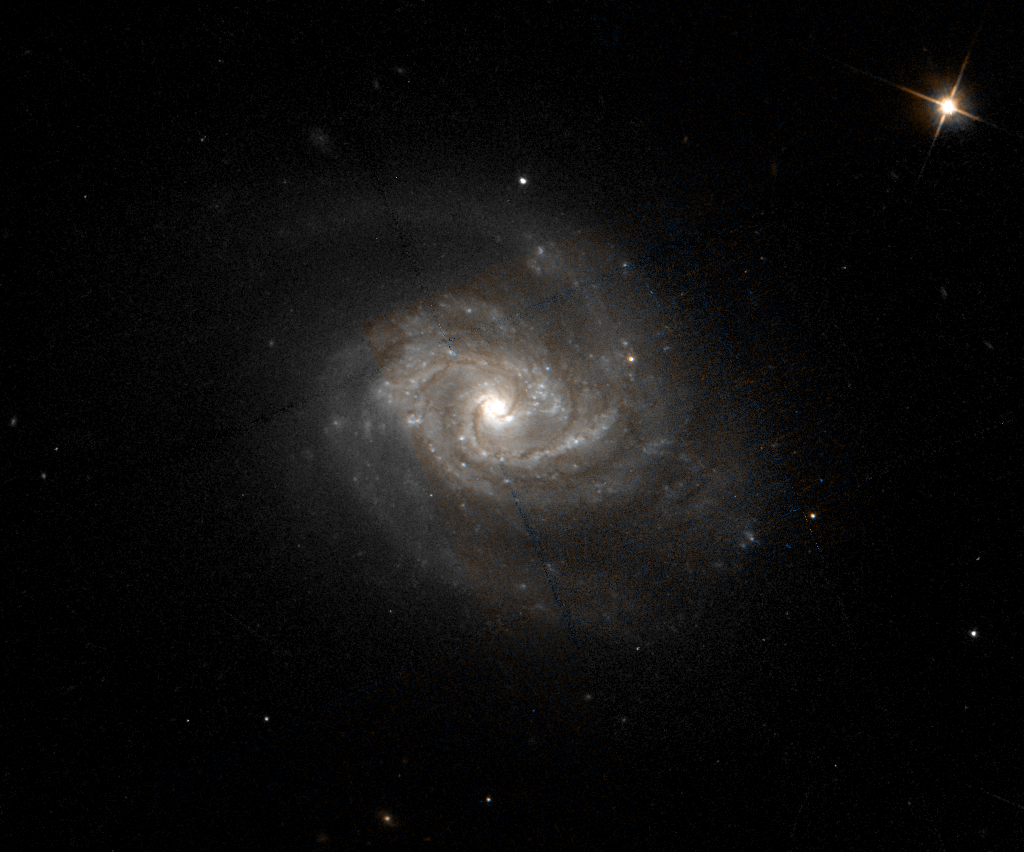
- Spiral galaxy NGC 664 imaged by the Hubble Space Telescope

Observation data (J2000 epoch)
- Constellation: Pisces
- Right ascension: 01^{h} 43^{m} 45.7857^{s}
- Declination: +04° 13′ 22.486″
- Redshift: 0.018113
- Heliocentric radial velocity: 5430 ± 3 km/s
- Distance: 247.1 ± 17.3 Mly (75.77 ± 5.31 Mpc)
- Group or cluster: NGC 664 Group
- Apparent magnitude (V): 12.8

Characteristics
- Type: Sb?
- Size: ~114,600 ly (35.14 kpc) (estimated)
- Apparent size (V): 1.1′ × 0.9′

Other designations
- IRAS 01411+0358, 2MASX J01434582+0413222, UGC 1210, MCG +01-05-029, PGC 6359, CGCG 412-023

NGC 664 is a spiral galaxy in the constellation of Pisces. Its velocity with respect to the cosmic microwave background is 5137 ± 21 km/s, which corresponds to a Hubble distance of 247.1 ± 17.3 Mly (75.77 ± 5.31 Mpc). In addition, six non redshift measurements give a closer distance of 218.91 ± 3.66 Mly (67.117 ± 1.123 Mpc). It was discovered by British astronomer John Herschel on 24 September 1830.

== Supernovae ==
Three supernovae have been observed in NGC 664:

- SN 1996bw (Type II, mag. 17.5) was discovered by the BAO Supernova Survey on 30 November 1996.
- SN 1997W (Type II, mag. 18) was discovered by the Harvard–Smithsonian Center for Astrophysics on 1 February 1997.
- SN 1999eb (Type IIn, mag. 16.2) was discovered by the Lick Observatory Supernova Search (LOSS) on 2 October 1999.

== NGC 664 Group ==
NGC 664 is the namesake of the four member NGC 664 group. The other three galaxies are: IC 150, UGC 1204, and UGC 1240.

== See also ==
- List of NGC objects (1–1000)
