= Yuqun =

Yuqun is a surname. People associated with the surname include:

- Han Yuqun
- Xue Yuqun
