= Wang Shouguan =

Chinese astronomer (1923–2021)

- Born: January 15, 1923; Fuzhou, Fujian, China
- Died: January 28, 2021 (aged 98); Beijing, China
- Education: Mawei Naval School; Royal Naval College, Greenwich
- Scientific career
- Fields: Astrophysics
- Workplaces: Purple Mountain Observatory; Xujiahui Observatory; Beijing Astronomical Observatory

Chinese name
- Traditional Chinese: 王綬琯
- Simplified Chinese: 王绶琯
Transcriptions
Standard Mandarin
- Hanyu Pinyin: Wáng Shòuguān

Wang Shouguan (Chinese: 王绶琯; 15 January 1923 – 28 January 2021) was a Chinese astronomer, president and honorary president of the Chinese Astronomical Society. He was hailed as one of the founders of modern astrophysics and radio astronomy in China. He was a delegate to the 5th, 6th, 7th and 8th National People's Congress.

== Biography ==
Wang was born in Fuzhou, Fujian, on January 15, 1923. His uncle worked in the Republic of China Navy. In 1936, at the age of 13, he entered Mawei Naval School, he studied navigation at the beginning, but switched to shipbuilding later because of myopia. After graduating in 1943, he worked at a factory for a year. In 1945, he pursued advanced studies in the United Kingdom, where he studied at the Shipbuilding Class, Royal Naval College, Greenwich. In 1950 he switched to astronomy, and was hired as an assistant astronomer at the University of London.

Wang returned to China in 1953. He successively worked at the Purple Mountain Observatory, Xujiahui Observatory, and Beijing Astronomical Observatory. In 1981, he became deputy director of the Department of Mathematical Physics, Chinese Academy of Sciences, rising to director in 1994. In October 1993, the asteroid with international code 3171 was named "Wangshouguan".

On January 28, 2021, he died of illness in Beijing, aged 98.

== Honours and awards ==
- 1980 Member of the Chinese Academy of Sciences (CAS)
- 1996 Science and Technology Progress Award of the Ho Leung Ho Lee Foundation
- 1998 Member of the International Eurasian Academy of Sciences

Academic offices
Preceded by Zhang Yuzhe	5th President of the Chinese Astronomical Society; 1985-1989	Succeeded by Li Qibin
