= Oriental management =

Ideology and management practices

Oriental management is a modern management school based on both the latest and historical theories as well as practices and rules of management inside and outside China. Although similar thoughts have been proposed in the early 1970s, oriental management gained traction in the early 1990s having been launched Su Dongshui. The concept is generally based on the unique traditional culture of eastern countries, especially China, and has integrated the essence of management thoughts from both the east and the west, after decades of study.

The theoretical foundations of oriental management are Chinese Management, Western Management, and Overseas Chinese Management. It adopted an approach that is people-oriented, with a strong focus on "human morality," and "human behavior." The framework prioritizes learning, ideal behavior, governing, action, and harmony.

== Utility ==
Aside from serving as a form of management standards for Chinese companies, oriental management can be useful for managers and organizations that encounter specific challenges involving ethics, conflict, and poor performance. Since it incorporates elements of Confucianism, Taoism, Buddhism and Western management theories, it is capable of creating a culture of accommodation, transformation, learning, teamwork, and respect for hierarchy, among others. An understanding of oriental management can also provide people interested in doing business in China meaningful insights into the Chinese business practices and norms.

== Scope ==
The research scope of oriental management is not confined to business, but extending to almost all fields of management, including individual governance, management analysis, family governance, business governance and state governance. By exercising and implementing the "Fifteen philosophical elements", including rules of governing a state, flexibility against changes, human orientedness, application of power, pragmaticism, regarding harmony as priority, attaching importance on using tools, state governance by law, embarking on a business with credit and good faith, being well planned, stratagem in decision making, subtle using of tactics, being highly efficient and uncorrupted, being industrious in making a fortune, and entelechy with reason, the highest purpose or ultimate value of oriental management is harmonious society in which everybody fulfills his comprehensive and free development.

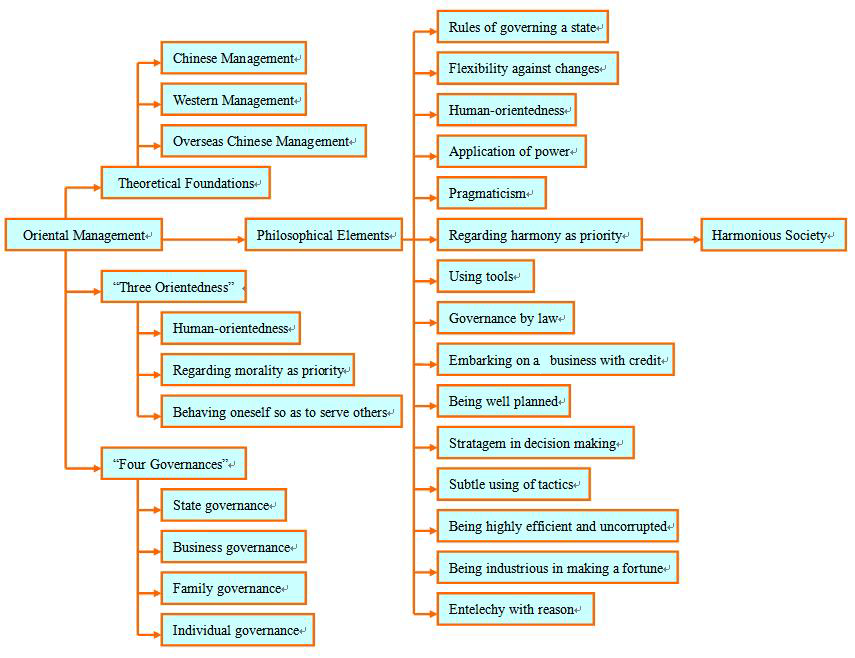
