= 2021 Zhecheng school fire =

2021 fire at a martial arts school in Zhecheng, Henan, China

Zhecheng school fire
- Date: 25 June 2021
- Time: 3:00 a. m.
- Location: Zhecheng, Henan, China
- Deaths: 18
- Injuries: 16

On 25 June 2021, a fire at a martial arts school in Zhecheng, Henan, China, killed at least 18 people.

== Background ==
The school advertised online hour-long classes each day for different martial arts disciplines, along with an unspecified boarding school style teachings. It had also not gone through the fire safety auditing process required for all martial arts training institutions, and the building had been a privately built home before it was a school.

== Fire ==
At 3 a.m. on 25 June 2021, a fire broke out at the Zhenxing Martial Arts Centre, which teaches martial arts. It is located in Zhecheng County in the Henan province of China. Thirty-four students were on the premise at the time of the fire and were sleeping on the first floor. Eyewitnesses claimed they could hear the students screaming while they attempted to fight the fire by pouring water on it, and the fire quickly became so fierce that rescue efforts were hampered.

At least 18 people were killed and 16 others injured, of which four were severely injured and twelve with light injuries. Most of the victims were pupils between seven and sixteen years old who lived and studied there.

== Investigation ==
It is unclear how the fire started. The person in charge of the centre had been arrested. Four local officials were fired shortly after the incident, and two more suspects were arrested.

One of the parents of the children said that "all information is being blocked".
