= 2021 East Asia sandstorm =

2021 sandstorm in East Asia

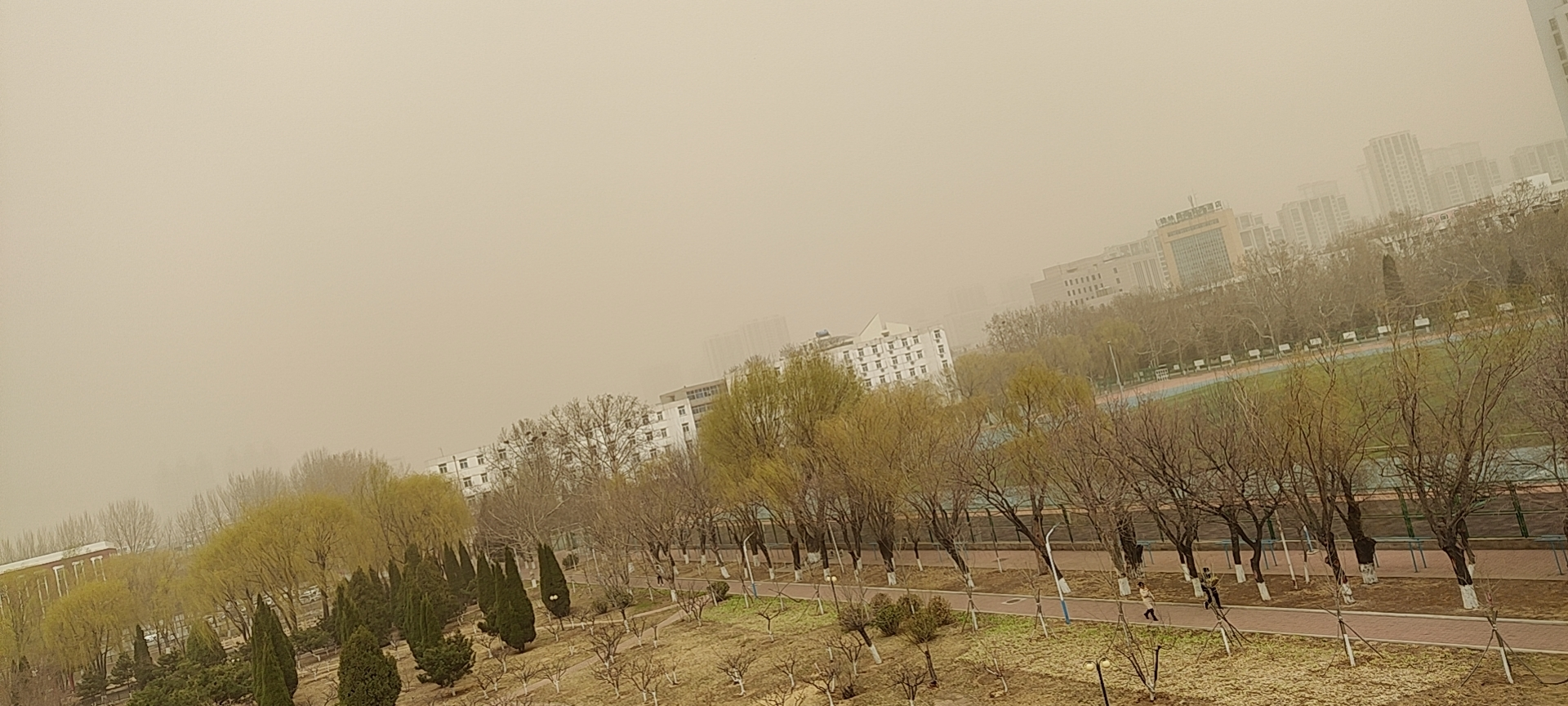
- Northeastern University Qinhuangdao Branch during the sandstorm.

Meteorological history
- Formed: March 14, 2021
- Dissipated: March 27, 2021

Sandstorm

Overall effects
- Fatalities: 10
- Areas affected: Mongolia; China; (Ningxia, Qinghai, Gangsu, Inner Mongolia, Shanxi, Shaanxi, Hebei, Beijing, Henan, Shandong); North Korea; South Korea

The 2021 East Asia sandstorm was a meteorological phenomenon that began in the Eastern Gobi desert steppe on March 14, and subsequently spread to the entire Mongolian Plateau South, the Loess Plateau, the North China Plain and the Korean Peninsula. It was caused by strong northwest winds coming in from Mongolia, as a result of hot and dry conditions.

== Background ==
Beijing and cities in the Mongolian Plateau regularly experience sandstorms in March and April, partially due to their proximity to the Gobi Desert. The issue has been compounded since the 1950s due to widespread deforestation and soil erosion. In particular, forests on the border with Mongolia were cut down, which previously provided protection against sand from the Gobi Desert. In 1978, China started the Three-North Shelter Forest Program to counteract the effects, in particular by planting new trees on 35 million hectares of land to trap incoming dust. Air corridors were also created to allow sand to pass more quickly. The country's Ministry of Ecology and Environment said these measures were reducing the impact and duration of sandstorms. The average number of sandy days in Beijing has fallen from 26 in the 1950s to 3 in 2010.

Immediately prior to the sandstorm, Beijing had been experiencing high levels of pollution, with the city covered in smog, as a result of heavy industry work to recover from the pandemic.

== Impact ==
=== Mongolian Plateau ===
In Mongolia the sandstorm caused 10 deaths. In three cities in the Chinese region of Inner Mongolia schools were canceled and the public transport system was temporarily halted. Flights out of Hohhot, Inner Mongolia's capital, were grounded.

The sandstorm was the strongest experienced in Ningxia in 19 years. Outdoor activities in schools had been canceled, although schools were left open.

The sandstorm ended in the east, before appearing again in Wuhai on March 19. On March 20, a blue alert for sandstorms was issued in central Inner Mongolia, Ningxia and the North China Plain, but spread further west to Xinjiang as well.

=== Rest of China ===
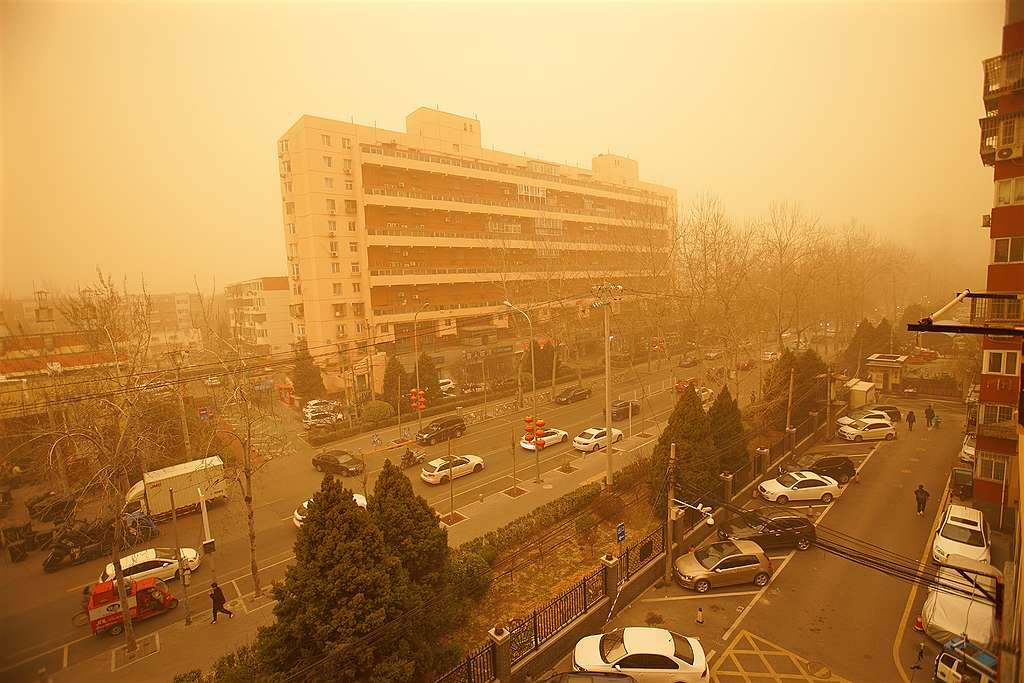
Beijing during the sandstorm

The sandstorm was the biggest to hit China in a decade, causing pollution levels in some districts to rise to 160 times the recommended limit. It affected 12 provinces in China, including the Chinese capital Beijing which the storm hit on March 15.

Visibility in Beijing was lowered to less than 1,000 feet (300 m). Over 400 flights at the city's main airports – Capital Airport and Daxing Airport – were cancelled, a fifth of all flights and more than the typical number for Asian Dust sandstorms. Visibility at the Beijing Daxing airport had dropped to 400–800 metres. PM2.5 levels in Beijing reached a maximum 680 micrograms per cubic meter, the highest levels seen since May 2017, and the PM10 air quality index peaked at a maximum reading of 999. Guidelines from the World Health Organization suggest that PM2.5 levels above 25 μg/m^3 are unsafe. PM10 levels reached over 8,100 micrograms per cubic metre in six central districts. Schools have been told to cancel outdoor events, and people with respiratory diseases, as well as children and older residents, were advised to stay indoors.

The city of Tangshan – a major source of industrial pollution – stated it would sanction companies for not carrying out emergency anti-smog measures.

China's environment ministry stated the storm would dissipate by March 18.

=== South Korea ===
On March 16, the sandstorm reached western South Korea. The Korea Meteorological Administration forecasted "very bad" PM10 levels – over 151 micrograms per cubic meter – in the Seoul Capital Area and on Jeju Island, as well as the provinces of Chungcheong and Jeolla. The agency also predicted "bad" levels in the provinces of Gangwon and Gyeongsang, though the actual levels ended up being "very bad".

== Alert ==
The China Meteorological Administration issued a yellow alert for sandstorms, and the meteorological department for Inner Mongolia, Ningxia, together with Jiuquan, Gansu and Yulin, Shaanxi, issued orange alerts, the second highest level.
