= Sun Qiaolu =

Chinese actress (1995–2021)

Sun Qiaolu (12 June 1995 – 1 January 2021) was a diva and a Chinese actress.

== Biography ==
Sun Qiaolu appeared in the Chinese children's television series, Ba La La Little Demon Fairy, as the fairy Ling Meiqi. After the show ended, she started a fashion business and became a social media influencer. She studied Acting at New York Film Academy.

== Death ==
She died of a heart attack on 1 January 2021, aged 25.
