= Gao Shangquan =

Chinese economist (1929–2021)

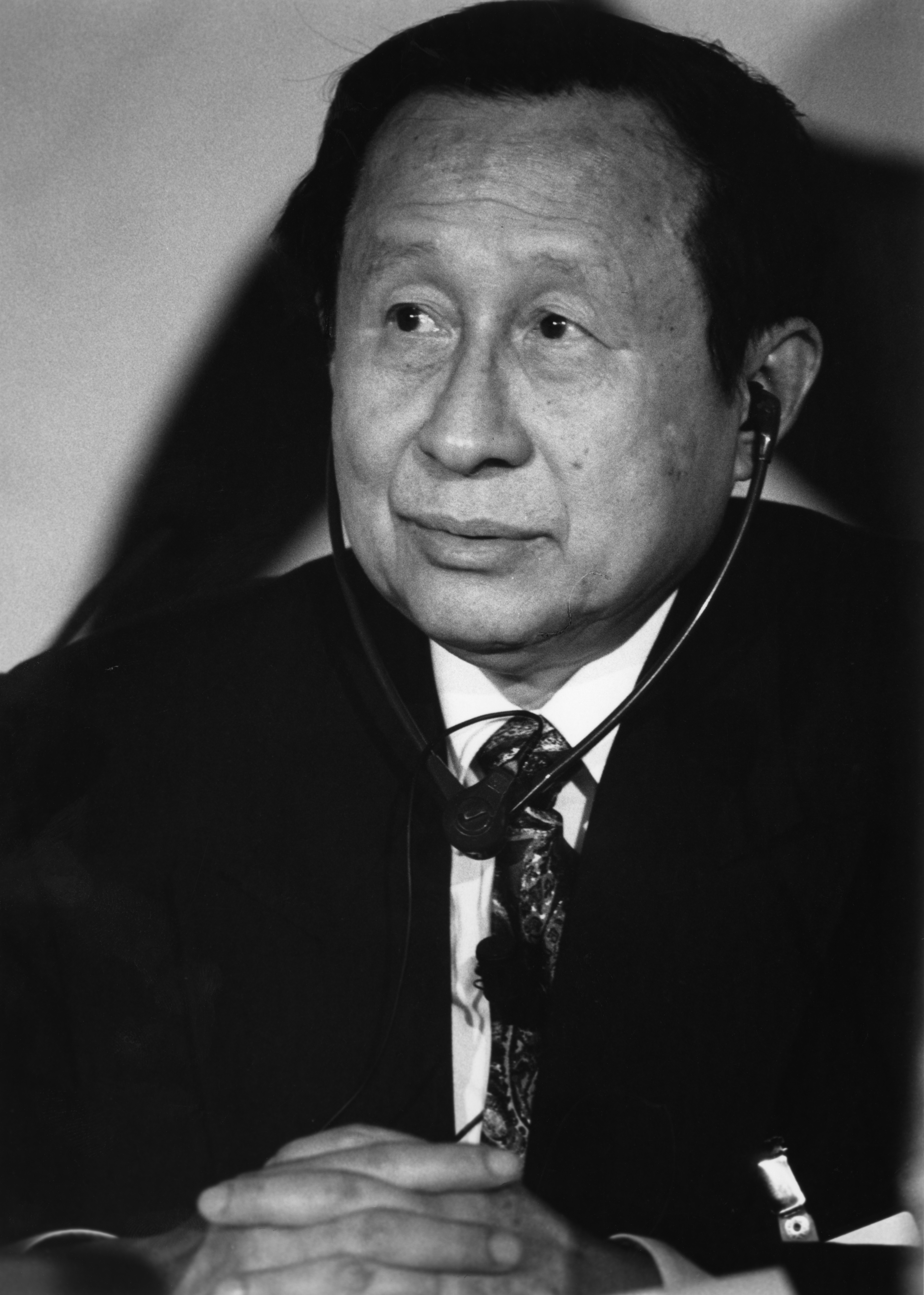
Image of Gao

Gao Shangquan (September 10, 1929 – June 27, 2021) was a Chinese economist.

== Life ==
The 1984 Decision on Economic System Reform followed intense debates. Gao Shangquan frequently clashed with Party theoretician Wang Renzhi, later a key figure in the 1989–1992 conservative backlash. Backed by Hu Yaobang and Zhao Ziyang, the Third Plenum of the 12th Central Committee ultimately endorsed the concept of a "planned commodity economy" (有计划的商品经济), marking a milestone in China's reform era.

From 1985 to 1993, Gao was vice chairman of the National Economic System Reform Committee. From 1998 to 2003 he was a member of the 9th National Committee and director of the Chinese Society for Economic System Reform.

Until 2010, Gao was also chairman of the Board of Directors of the Foundation for Research into Chinese Economic Reforms and Professor of Peking University and Dean of the Faculty of Management at Zhejiang University.

His funeral in 2021 was attended by former Premier Wen Jiabao.

== Works ==
His publications, "The Reform of China's Industrial System" (1987) and "Two Decades of Reform in China" (中国改革二十年) (1999), exerted a decisive influence on the development of Chinese reform and opening-up policy.
