= Zhou Yulin =

Chinese mathematician (1923–2021)

- 周毓麟
- Born: 12 February 1923; Shanghai, China
- Died: 2 March 2021 (aged 98); Beijing, China
- Education: Utopia University
- Scientific career
- Fields: Mathematics
- Workplaces: Peking University; Chinese Academy of Sciences

Zhou Yulin (Chinese: 周毓麟; pinyin: Zhōu Yùlín; 12 February 1923 – 2 March 2021) was a Chinese mathematician and academic of the Chinese Academy of Sciences.

== Biography ==
Zhou was born in Shanghai, on 12 February 1923, while his ancestral home was in Zhenhai, Zhejiang. In 1941, he was admitted to Utopia University, where he majored in mathematics. After graduating in October 1945, he became an assistant at Nanjing Temporary University and one year later was transferred to the Institute of Mathematics, Academia Sinica as an assistant. In October 1949, he joined the faculty of Peking University. After studying Russian in Beijing Russian College for several months, he was sent to study at Moscow State University on government scholarships. He returned to China in August 1957 and continued to teach at Peking University. In 1960, he was transferred to the Beijing No.9 Research Institute, the Second Machinery Industry (now China Academy of Engineering Physics). On 2 March 2021, he died of illness in Beijing, aged 98.

== Contributions ==
He contributed to the mathematical simulation and physical processes of China's nuclear weapons.

== Works ==
- 一维非定常流体力学 [One Dimensional Unsteady Hydrodynamics] (in Chinese). Beijing: Science Press Co., Ltd. 1990. ISBN 9787030017727.
- 微分方程数值解 [Numerical Solutions of Differential Equations] (in Chinese). Shijiazhuang, Hebei: Hebei Education Press. 2003. ISBN 9787543450301.

== Honours and awards ==
- 1982 State Natural Science Award (First Class)
- 1985 State Science and Technology Progress Award (Special)
- 1991 Member of the Chinese Academy of Sciences (CAS)
- 1996 Science and Technology Progress Award of the Ho Leung Ho Lee Foundation
- 1997 Hua Luogeng Mathematics Prize
- 2006 Su Buqing Applied Mathematics Prize (Special)
