= 2021 Guangzhou bombing =

2021 bombing in Guangzhou

- Location: 23°01′04″N 113°28′31″E; Guangzhou, Guangdong, China
- Date: 22 March 2021; 10:00 CST (02:00 UTC)
- Attack type: Suicide bombing
- Weapon: Bomb
- Deaths: 5 (including the perpetrator)
- Injuries: 5

A bombing took place on 22 March 2021 in the city of Guangzhou, capital of the province of Guangdong, China, when a man detonated a bomb killing five people, including himself, and injuring five others. The perpetrator targeted a local government office in the Mingjing Village of the Panyu District, where there had been disputes between residents and officials over an alleged land-grabbing scheme. According to local media, the office attacked was responsible for land use matters, and officials had given 270 acres (1.1 km^{2}) of land to Shanghai developers for a project to attract tourists, displacing families living in the area.

== See also ==
- 2014 Guangzhou attack
- Chinese property law
