= Su Dongshui =

Chinese economist (died 2021)

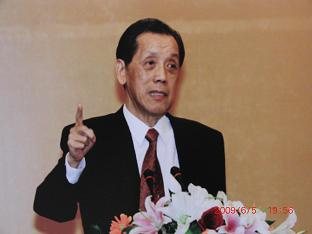

Su Dongshui (1931/2 – June 13, 2021), chief professor of Fudan University, Shanghai, China, and the chair of IFSAM 9th world conference (2008), Shanghai, China, was the founder of the oriental management school. Oriental management is a new research branch in the world academia of management science. As an experienced scholar, Su was engaged in the teaching and scientific studies in Shanghai Academy of Social Sciences, Shanghai University of Finance Economics and Fudan University successively, after his graduation from Xiamen University in 1953. During his more than 50 years of teaching career, he brought up more than 200 masters, over 80 doctors and 40 post-doctors. Many of his students have become leaders of governments, colleges or universities and enterprises.

In July 2022, a year after his death, Su was exposed by media to be involved in diploma mill scandal related to Chen Chun Hua along with his son Su Zong Wei.

== Works ==
- Oriental Management, Shanghai: Fudan University Press, China, 2005
- Applied Economics, Shanghai: Oriental Publishing Center, China, 2005
- Chinese Management, Shanghai: Fudan University Press, China, 2006
- Management, Shanghai: Oriental Publishing Center, China, 2001
- Industry Economics, Beijing: Higher Education Press, China, 2000
