= Naku La =

Naku La (Laduo La)
- Location within Sikkim Location within Tibet
- Elevation: 5,280 metres (17,320 ft)

Third Approach
- Location: India (Sikkim) – China (Tibet)
- Range: Himalaya
- Coordinates: 28°02′26″N 88°28′49″E

Naku La
- Traditional Chinese: 納庫拉山口
- Simplified Chinese: 纳库拉山口
Transcriptions

Naku La (Chinese: 纳库拉山口) or Laduo La (Chinese: 拉多拉山口) is a mountain pass between Tibet Autonomous Region in China and Sikkim in India. Naku La has been a flashpoint for Indian and Chinese patrols and military infrastructure construction in the area.
