= Chen Qingru =

Chinese scientist (1926–2021)

- 陈清如
- Born: December 3, 1926; Hangzhou, Zhejiang, China
- Died: May 26, 2021 (aged 94); Xuzhou, Jiangsu, China
- Education: Southwest Jiaotong University
- Scientific career
- Fields: Mineral processing
- Workplaces: China University of Mining and Technology

Chinese name
- Traditional Chinese: 陳清如
- Simplified Chinese: 陈清如
Transcriptions
Standard Mandarin
- Hanyu Pinyin: Chén Qīngrú

Chen Qingru (Chinese: 陈清如; December 3, 1926 – 26 May 2021) was a Chinese scientist specializing in mineral processing. He was an academician of the Chinese Academy of Engineering.

== Biography ==
Chen was born in Hangzhou, Zhejiang, on December 3, 1926. In 1948, he was admitted to Tangshan Jiaotong University (now Southwest Jiaotong University), where he majored in the Mining Department. After graduating in September 1952, he joined the faculty of Beijing Institute of Mining and Technology. In December of that same year, he was sent to study at Moscow Institute of Mining at the expense of the Chinese government. He returned to China in December 1960 and continued to teach at Beijing Institute of Mining and Technology. In June 1975, he was transferred to Sichuan Institute of Mining and Technology as deputy director of its Department of Mining Machinery, and held that office until 1980. In September 1980, he moved to China University of Mining and Technology as department head of Coal Comprehensive Utilization System. In January 1987, he became director of the university's Mineral Processing Engineering Research Center. He died of illness in Xuzhou, Jiangsu, on May 26, 2021, aged 94.

== Honours and awards ==
- 1995 Member of the Chinese Academy of Engineering (CAE)
- 2010 IOC Chairman's Lifetime Achievement Award
- 2010 Kentucky Colonelship

== Bibliography ==
- Xue Yi; Jia Ling; Wang Haifeng (2014). 一心向学：陈清如传 [Concentrate on Study: Biography of Chen Qingru] (in Chinese). Shanghai: Shanghai Jiaotong University Press. ISBN 9787313119148.
