= Guo Jingkun =

Chinese scientist (1933–2021)

- 郭景坤
- Born: 21 November 1933; Shanghai, China
- Died: 17 August 2021 (aged 87); Shanghai, China
- Education: Fudan University
- Scientific career
- Fields: Materials science Inorganic chemistry
- Workplaces: Shanghai Institute of Ceramics, Chinese Academy of Sciences

Guo Jingkun (Chinese: 郭景坤; pinyin: Guō Jǐngkūn; 21 November 1933 – 17 August 2021) was a Chinese scientist in the fields of materials science and inorganic chemistry. He was a member of the Communist Party and an academician of the Chinese Academy of Sciences.

== Biography ==
Guo was born in Shanghai, on 21 November 1933, while his ancestral home was in Xinhui, Guangdong. After graduating from Fudan University in 1958, he was despatched to the Shanghai Institute of Ceramics, Chinese Academy of Sciences, where he eventually became director in December 1983. On 17 August 2021, he died in Shanghai, aged 87.

== Honours and awards ==
- 1990 Member of the International Academy of Ceramics
- 1991 Member of the Chinese Academy of Sciences
- 1997 Member of the Asian and Pacific Academy of Materials Sciences
- 1999 Member of The World Academy of Sciences
- 2004 Science and Technology Progress Award of the Ho Leung Ho Lee Foundation
