= Fourth session of the 13th National People's Congress =

2021 National People's Congress; 第十三届全国人民代表大会第四次会议; _{4rd plenary session of the}; _{13th National People's Congress}; 5 March – 11 March
President	Premier	Congress Chairman
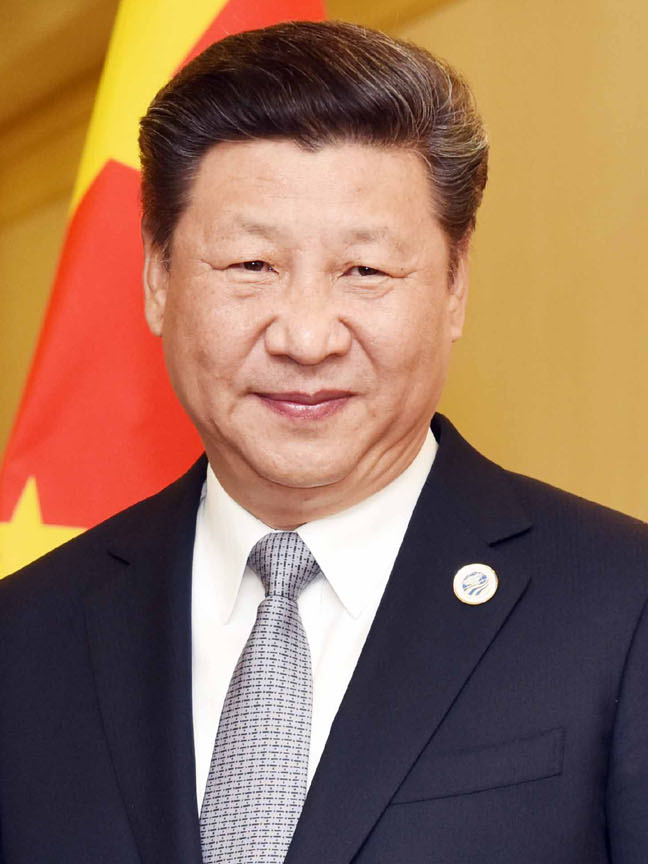
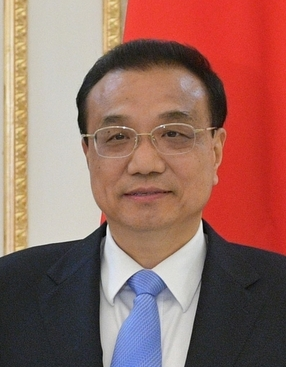
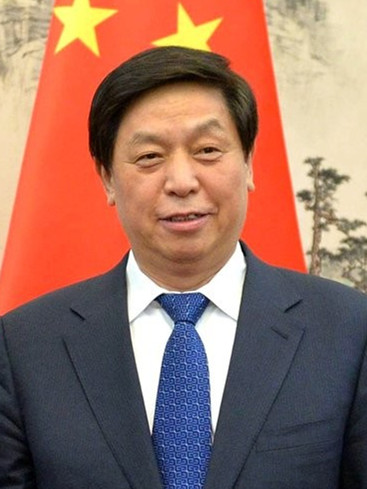
Xi Jinping	Li Keqiang	Li Zhanshu
since 14 March 2013	since 15 March 2013	since 17 March 2018

The fourth session of the 13th National People's Congress of the People's Republic of China (PRC) was held from 5 March to 11 March 2021, concurrently with the Chinese People's Political Consultative Conference (CPPCC) as part of the annual Two Sessions. The 13th National People's Congress was held at the Great Hall of the People in Beijing.

== The session ==
Due to the ongoing COVID-19 pandemic, the Congress was mostly held in camera with journalists prohibited from attending. The thousands of deputies in attendance were all tested for SARS-CoV-2 and isolated before the event. Most of the events involving reporters took place through online conferencing.

Premier Li Keqiang announced a GDP growth goal of 6%, which was considered conservative compared to those of previous years, despite a goal from 2020 not being set due to the COVID-19 pandemic. Li also set targets for reducing the State Council's budget deficit from 3.6% of GDP in 2020 to around 3.2% of GDP in 2021 and announced plans to lower the quota on special bond issuance by local governments.

The NPC reviewed the draft fourteenth five-year plan.

== Voting results ==
=== Resolutions ===
Topic	For	Against	Abstain	Rate
Premier Li Keqiang's Government Work Report	2,895	0	1	99.97%
Draft Outline of the 14th Five-Year Plan for National Economic and Social Development and the Long-Term Objectives for 2035	2,873	1	0	99.20%
Report on the Implementation of the 2020 National Economic and Social Development Plan and the 2021 Draft Plan	2,870	21	5	99.10%
Report on the Execution of the Central and Local Budgets for 2020 and on the Draft Central and Local Budgets for 2021	2,843	36	17	98.17%
National People's Congress Organic Law Amendment	2,890	2	4	99.79%
National People's Congress Rules Procedure Amendment	2,895	0	1	99.97%
Decision on improving the electoral system of Hong Kong	2,895	0	1	99.97%
Chairman Li Zhanshu's NPCSC Work Report	2,883	6	4	99.55%
Chief Justice Zhou Qiang's Supreme People's Court Work Report	2,800	65	24	96.69%
Procurator-General Zhang Jun's Supreme People's Procuratorate Work Report	2,822	52	22	97.44%
