= Shen Shanjiong =

Chinese scientist (1917–2021)

- 沈善炯
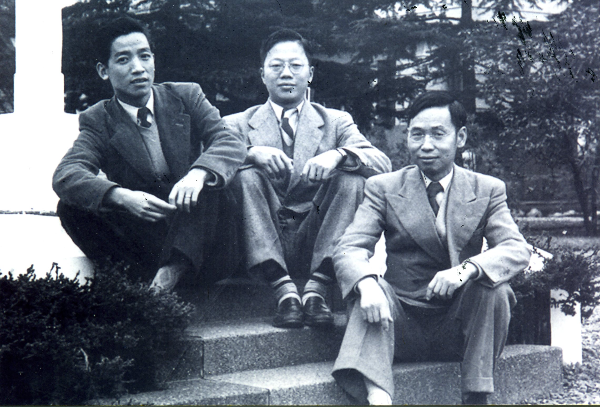
- Shen Shanjiong (left), Luo Shijun (middle) and Zhao Zhongyao (right) in the Embassy of the Republic of China in Japan, in November 1951
- Born: 13 April 1917; Wujiang County, Jiangsu, China
- Died: 26 March 2021 (aged 103); Shanghai, China
- Education: National Southwestern Associated University; California Institute of Technology
- Scientific career
- Fields: Microbial biochemistry
- Workplaces: Institute of Plant Physiology and Ecology, Chinese Academy of Sciences

Shen Shanjiong (Chinese: 沈善炯; pinyin: Shěn Shànjiǒng; 13 April 1917 – 26 March 2021) was a Chinese microbiologist and geneticist. He was an academician of the Chinese Academy of Sciences.

== Biography ==
Shen was born into a family of farming background in Wujiang County, Jiangsu, on 13 April 1917. He attended Tailaiqiao School (泰来桥初级小学) and Tongli School (同里高级小学). After graduating from Wujiang Middle School (吴江中学), he was accepted to Suzhou Agricultural School. In 1937, he was admitted to the University of Nanking. In the summer of the same year, he studied at the Agricultural College of Guangxi University due to the Second Sino-Japanese War. In 1939, he transferred to the National Southwestern Associated University, where he studied fungus under Dai Fanglan (戴芳澜).

In 1944, he became an instructor at Huazhong University. The next year, he worked as an assistant researcher at the Institute of Botany, Academia Sinica, in Beibei, Sichuan (now Beibei District of Chongqing), under the introduction of Zhang Jingyue (张景钺). In 1946, he was appointed an assistant of the Department of Botany, Peking University.

In 1947, he pursued advanced studies in the United States, first earning a doctor's degree in molecular genetics from California Institute of Technology in 1950 and then carried out postdoctoral research at the University of Wisconsin. He returned to China after the outbreak of the Korean War. In November 1950, he became an associate professor at the School of Medicine, Zhejiang University. In 1952, he was transferred to the Chinese Academy of Sciences as an associate research fellow and was promoted to research fellow in 1956. Since 1980, he was a visiting professor at California Institute of Technology, New York University Grossman School of Medicine, Harvard Medical School, and Boston Biomedical Research Institute. In 1984, he was hired as an honorary professor of Shanghai Jiao Tong University, helping to set up the Department of Biological Science and Technology.

On 26 March 2021, he died of illness in Shanghai, aged 103.

== Contributions ==
Shen’s college life was largely influenced by World War II. In 1937, he was admitted to University of Nanking. However, the war between Chinese and Japanese armies at Nanjing resulted in closures and relocations of many departments of University of Nanking, including the school of agriculture in which Shen was studying. Under the influence of the intensifying warfare, Shen was forced to exile to Kunming, Yunnan Province, in 1938. There he got a chance to enroll in the National Southwestern Associated University and met his first mentor, Professor Zhang Jing-ax, who recommended him to study abroad at the California Institute of Technology. During his three years at Caltech, Shen and his mentor, Professor Horowitz, mainly did research on tyrosinase formation, and found that tyrosinase production by wild type Neurospora was inhibited by humidity and sulfide containing substances. In his later years, Shen recalled that while Southwestern Associated University shaped him into a scientist, Caltech allowed him to learn about the frontiers of biological research.

In the early 1950s, there were only three countries around the world that had mature technologies to produce Chlortetracycline: the United States, the United Kingdom, and Italy. After attending a national antibiotics symposium in 1952, Shen, together with his research team, decided to start their research on synthesis of Chlortetracycline. In 1957, he found and solved the inhibition effect of iron ions on Chlortetracycline production. Two years later, he found that the aromatic ring of Chlortetracycline came from sedoheptulose-1,7-diphosphate. He also found that phosphate terminates the pentose cycle, thus inhibiting the synthesis of sedoheptulose-1,7-diphosphate. Based on his research outcomes, the manufacturers limited the concentration of phosphate in the fermentation media, thus largely enhanced the efficiency of large-scale Chlortetracycline production in China, making China the fourth country in the world to produce aureomycin.

Other major research focuses of Shen included genetics of bacterial nitrogen fixation. Shen and his colleagues reexamined the earlier finding of Dixon and Kennedy that there was a 9000bp silence region between the two clusters of nine nitrogen-fixation (nif) genes of K. pnuemoniae in the neighborhood of his operon. Shen examined 7 different nif genes and proved that they were all mapped in a single cluster in the region, without the presence of a silence region. He also found that nif mutant C-7 was an example of a class of nif genes that exerted a regulatory effect on other nif genes, besides specifying their own product.

== Honours and awards ==
- 1956 State Natural Science Award (First Class)
- 1979 State Natural Science Award (First Class)
- 1981 State Natural Science Award (First Class)
- 1997 Tan Kah Kee Award for Life Sciences
- 1999 Science and Technology Progress Award of the Ho Leung Ho Lee Foundation
- 1980 Member of the Chinese Academy of Sciences (CAS)
