= Huang Xiling =

Chinese geotechnical specialist (1927–2021)

- 黄熙龄
- Born: April 24, 1927; Zhongxiang County, Hubei, China
- Died: June 16, 2021 (aged 94); Beijing, China
- Education: National Central University; Moscow State University of Civil Engineering
- Scientific career
- Fields: Geotechnical engineering
- Workplaces: China Academy of Building Research

Chinese name
- Simplified Chinese: 黄熙龄
- Traditional Chinese: 黃熙齡
Transcriptions
Standard Mandarin
- Hanyu Pinyin: Huáng Xīlíng

Huang Xiling (Chinese: 黄熙龄; 24 April 1927 – 16 June 2021) was a Chinese geotechnical specialist and an academician of the Chinese Academy of Engineering (CAE).

== Biography ==
Huang was born in Zhongxiang County, Hubei, on 24 April 1927. In 1933 he attended the Methodist Primary School (循道会小学), a church school in Hankou. After the Imperial Japanese Army occupied Wuhan, he fled to Wanxian County, southwest China's Sichuan province, with his elder female cousin Huang Pengling (黄彭玲), and completed his primary school education at Huancheng Road Primary School (环城路小学). He secondary studied at Jiangjin National 9th High School (江津国立第九中学) in the neighboring Chongqing city. In 1945, he was admitted to National Central University, majoring in the Department of Civil Engineering. After graduating in 1949, he was dispatched to the Nanjing Military Control Commission. After a short year in the Infrastructure Division of Northeast Planning Commission, he was transferred to Northeast Construction Bureau as secretary of the director. In January 1955, he was sent to study at the Moscow State University of Civil Engineering on government scholarships. He returned to China in January 1959 and joined the Science and Technology Committee of the Ministry of Construction (now Ministry of Housing and Urban-Rural Development). In January 2005, he moved to the China Academy of Building Research, where he successively served as its vice president and president. He died of illness in Beijing, on 16 June 2021, aged 94.

== Works ==
- Huang Xiling, ed. (2004). 中国大百科全书 土木工程 [Encyclopedia of China: Civil Engineering] (in Chinese). Vol. 74. Beijing: Encyclopedia of China Publishing House.

== Honours and awards ==
- 1995 Member of the Chinese Academy of Engineering (CAE)
