= Xie Yuyuan =

Chinese pharmaceutical chemist (1924–2021)

- 谢毓元
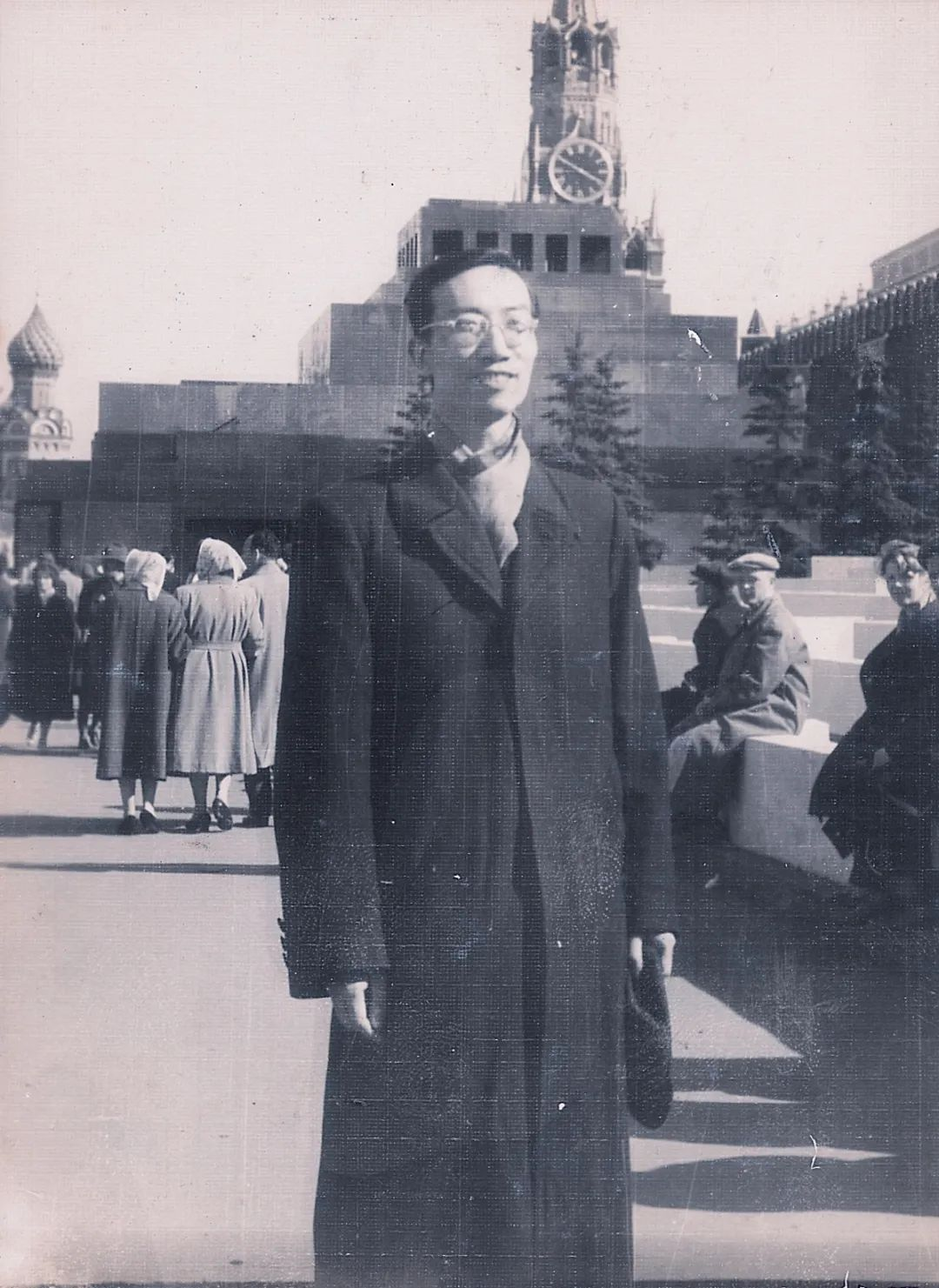
- Xie Yuyuan in 1958 in Red Square, Soviet Union
- Born: April 19, 1924; Beijing, China
- Died: March 27, 2021 (aged 96); Shanghai, China
- Education: Soochow University; Tsinghua University
- Scientific career
- Fields: Pharmaceutical chemistry
- Workplaces: Shanghai institute of Organic Chemistry, Chinese Academy of Sciences

Chinese name
- Traditional Chinese: 謝毓元
- Simplified Chinese: 谢毓元
Transcriptions
Standard Mandarin
- Hanyu Pinyin: Xiè Yùyuán

Xie Yuyuan (Chinese: 谢毓元; April 19, 1924 – March 27, 2021) was a Chinese pharmaceutical chemist. He was an academician of the Chinese Academy of Sciences.

== Biography ==
Xie was born in Beijing, on April 19, 1924, while his ancestral home was in Suzhou, Jiangsu. In his early years, he studied in the Department of Chemical Engineering of Soochow University. In 1941, when the Imperial Japanese Army occupied the Shanghai concession, his father ordered him to drop out of school and stay at home. After the Second Sino-Japanese War in 1945, he was admitted to the Department of Chemistry, Tsinghua University. After graduating in 1949, he taught at the university. In 1951, he was dispatched to the Shanghai institute of Organic Chemistry, Chinese Academy of Sciences. He joined the Chinese Communist Party in 1956. In 1957, he was sent abroad to study at Russian Academy of Sciences at the expense of the government. He returned to China in September 1993 and continued to work at the Shanghai institute of Organic Chemistry. On March 27, 2021, he died in Shanghai, aged 96.
