= NGC 7673 =

Disturbed spiral galaxy in the constellation Pegasus

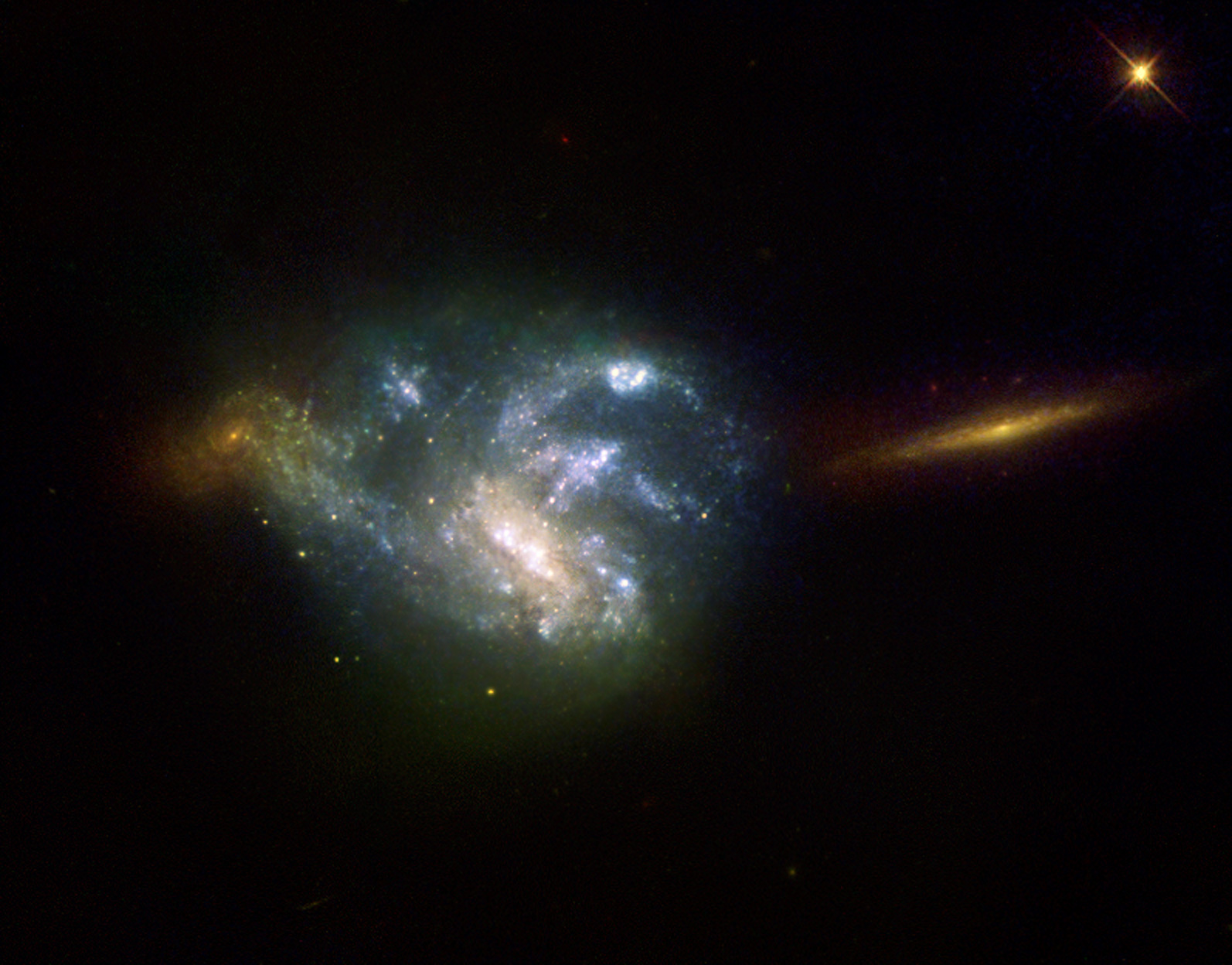
- A Hubble Space Telescope (HST) image of NGC 7673

Observation data (J2000 epoch)
- Constellation: Pegasus
- Right ascension: 23^{h} 27^{m} 41.060^{s}
- Declination: +23° 35′ 20.18″
- Heliocentric radial velocity: 3,408±1 km/s
- Distance: 152.7 Mly (46.83 Mpc)
- Apparent magnitude (V): 13.2

Characteristics
- Type: (R')SAc pec
- Apparent size (V): 1.3′ × 1.2′

Other designations
- UGC 12607, PGC 71493

NGC 7673 is a disturbed spiral galaxy located in the constellation Pegasus. The galaxy has experienced intense star formation activity and may therefore be referred to as a starburst galaxy.

== Supernovae ==
Two supernovae have been observed in NGC 7673:

- SN 2014ce (Type II, mag. 17) was discovered by the Lick Observatory Supernova Search (LOSS) on 9 August 2014.
- SN 2026abgb (Type II, mag. 18.9925) was discovered by the Zwicky Transient Facility on 10 September 2026.
