= Chen Niannian =

Chinese engineer (1941–2021)

- 陈念念
- Born: 4 October 1941; Shanghai, China
- Died: 21 December 2021 (aged 80); Tianjin, China
- Education: Tsinghua University
- Scientific career
- Fields: Nuclear material and fuel
- Workplaces: Tianjin Institute of Physical and Chemical Engineering of Nuclear Industry

Chinese name
- Simplified Chinese: 陈念念
- Traditional Chinese: 陳念念
Transcriptions
Standard Mandarin
- Hanyu Pinyin: Chén Niànniàn

Chen Niannian (4 October 1941 – 21 December 2021) was a Chinese engineer specializing in nuclear material and fuel, and an academician of the Chinese Academy of Engineering. He was a member of the China Nuclear Society.

== Life and career ==
Chen was born in Shanghai, on 4 October 1941, while his ancestral home in Wuxing County (now Huzhou), Zhejiang. In 1958, he was admitted to Tsinghua University, majoring in the Department of Physics. After graduating in 1964, he was despatched to the Second Ministry of Machinery Industry. In June 1984, he joined the Tianjin Institute of Physical and Chemical Engineering of Nuclear Industry, a research institution under the China National Nuclear Corporation. He joined the Chinese Communist Party (CCP) in December 1985. In December 1994, he was promoted to president of the Tianjin Institute of Physical and Chemical Engineering of Nuclear Industry, and held that office until April 2002. He died in Tianjin on 21 December 2021, at the age of 80.

== Honours and awards ==
- 1989 State Science and Technology Progress Award (Second Class) for experimental study on large cascade centrifuge.
- 2002 State Science and Technology Progress Award (Second Class) for study on separation power of composite subcritical centrifuge (FL machine).
- 2003 State Science and Technology Progress Award (Second Class) for the development of composite subcritical centrifuge (FL machine) single machine.
- 2005 Member of the Chinese Academy of Engineering (CAE)
