= Xu Houze =

Chinese scientist (1934–2021)

- 许厚泽
- Born: 4 May 1934; She County, Anhui, China
- Died: 31 August 2021 (aged 87); Wuhan, Hubei, China
- Education: Tongji University
- Scientific career
- Fields: Geophysics; Geodesy
- Workplaces: Institute of Geodesy and Geophysics, Chinese Academy of Sciences

Chinese name
- Simplified Chinese: 许厚泽
- Traditional Chinese: 許厚澤
Transcriptions
Standard Mandarin
- Hanyu Pinyin: Xǔ Hóuzé

Xu Houze (4 May 1934 – 31 August 2021) was a Chinese geodesist and geophysicist, and member of Chinese Academy of Sciences.

== Biography ==
Xu was born in She County, Anhui, on 4 May 1934. After graduating from Tongji University in 1955, he began graduate work at the Institute of Geodesy and Geophysics, Chinese Academy of Sciences. He joined the Communist Party in May 1983. In June 2006, he was hired as a Distinguished Professor at Shandong University of Technology. In April 2001, he was engaged by Huazhong University of Science and Technology as a professor and director of Institute of Geophysics. On 31 August 2021, he died from an illness in Wuhan, Hubei, aged 87.

He was a delegate to the 6th, 7th and 8th National People's Congress.

== Works ==
- 固体地球潮汐 [Solid Earth Tide] (in Chinese). Wuhan, Hubei: Hubei Science and Technology Press. 2010. ISBN 9787535245441.

== Honours and awards ==
- 1980 Title of National Labor Hero
- 1991 Member of the Chinese Academy of Sciences (CAS)
- 2004 Science and Technology Progress Award of the Ho Leung Ho Lee Foundation
