= Cheng Rongshi =

Chinese physical chemist (1927–2021)

- 程镕时
- Born: 18 October 1927; Yixing, Jiangsu, China
- Died: 7 February 2021 (aged 93); Guangzhou, Guangdong, China
- Education: University of Nanking; Peking University
- Scientific career
- Fields: Polymer physics Physical chemistry
- Workplaces: Changchun Institute of Applied Chemistry (1952-1982); Nanjing University (1983-1994); South China University of Technology (1995-retirement)
- Academic advisors: Dai Anbang; Zhang Longxiang

Chinese name
- Traditional Chinese: 程鎔時
- Simplified Chinese: 程镕时
Transcriptions
Standard Mandarin
- Hanyu Pinyin: Chéng Róngshí

Cheng Rongshi (Chinese: 程镕时; 18 October 1927 – 7 February 2021) was a Chinese physical chemist and academician of the Chinese Academy of Sciences.

== Biography ==
Cheng was born in Yixing, Jiangsu, on 18 October 1927. In 1945, he was admitted to the University of Nanking, where he studied chemistry under Dai Anbang. After graduating in 1949, he did his postgraduate work at Peking University.

In 1951, Cheng was dispatched to the Shanghai Institute of Physical Chemistry, Chinese Academy of Sciences. That same year, he moved to Changchun and worked at Changchun Institute of Applied Chemistry. In 1983, he joined the faculty of Nanjing University. In 1995, he became a professor and director of Macromolecule Research Institute of South China University of Technology.

On 7 February 2021, he died of illness in Guangzhou, Guangdong, aged 93.

== Honours and awards ==
- 1991 Member of the Chinese Academy of Sciences (CAS)
