= Influenza A virus subtype H10N3 =

Influenza virus subtype

- Treatment: N/A
- Frequency: ~160 animal cases in last 40 years

Influenza A virus subtype H10N3 is a subtype of viruses that causes influenza (flu). It is mostly present in wild avian species. The first human case was reported in 2021.

== In animals ==
Only around 160 cases of the virus have been reported in the 40 years before 2018, mostly in various waterfowl or wild birds. Existing studies show that H10 influenza viruses are present in a wide range of domestic and wild avian species, as well as in mammals, showing potential for adaptation. H10N3 has been isolated across a wide geographic distribution, including in species such as domestic poultry (chickens), ducks, other waterfowl, and terrestrial birds. In animals, the viruses display a complex pathology, with complex reassortments and mutations contributing to pathobiology patterns in chickens, ducks and mice indicative of a possible threat to humans, although H10N3 is usually a less severe strain and is unlikely to cause a significant outbreak.

== In humans ==
The first human case of H10N3 was reported in Zhenjiang, in China's eastern province of Jiangsu. This index case was a patient admitted to the hospital with a fever and worsening respiratory symptoms on April 28, 2021, with a diagnosis of H10N3 confirmed in May 2021. None of the individual's close contacts developed any symptoms or signs of infection. The virus identified from this individual contains an HA cleavage site that is consistent with a "low pathogenicity avian influenza" (LPAI), and is also a reassortant strain, combining the HA and NA genes from H10N3 with internal genes from H9N2 viruses.

According to China's National Health Commission (NHC), human cases of H10N3 have not been reported elsewhere in China. There are no indications that the virus is easily transmissible among humans, with no confirmed cases of human-to-human transmission. Other types of avian-origin H10 influenza have been reported in human beings, including in Egypt, Australia and China, highlighting a potential public health hazard, although none of the strains so far detected have shown signs of human transmission.
