= Xue Yuqun =

Chinese scientist (1931–2021)

- 薛禹群
- Born: 2 November 1931; Wuxi, Jiangsu, China
- Died: June 29, 2021 (aged 89); Shanghai, China
- Education: Southwest Jiaotong University; Jilin University
- Scientific career
- Fields: Hydrogeology
- Workplaces: Nanjing University

Xue Yuqun (Chinese: 薛禹群; pinyin: Xuē Yǔqún; 2 November 1931 – 29 June 2021) was a Chinese hydrogeologist. He was an academician of the Chinese Academy of Sciences.

== Biography ==
Xue was born into a wealthy and highly educated family in the town of Yuqi, Wuxi, Jiangsu, on 2 November 1931. His uncle Xue Mingjian was a politician. His uncle Sun Yefang was an economist. His elder female cousin Xue Yugu is a microbiologist. His younger male cousin Xue Yusheng is a physicist and member of the Chinese Academy of Engineering. He secondary studied at Private Wuxi High School (now Wuxi No.3 High School). In 1949, he was accepted to Tangshan Institute of Technology (now Southwest Jiaotong University). After graduating in 1952, he joined Nanjing University as an assistant. In 1955, he entered Changchun Institute of Geology (now Jilin University), studying geology with the tutor of Moscow Institute of Geological Exploration. He was a visiting scholar at the University of Arizona between 1982 and 1984. He was promoted to associate professor in 1986. He died of illness in Shanghai, on 29 June 2021, aged 89.

== Honours and awards ==
- 1999 Member of the Chinese Academy of Sciences (CAS)
