= Zhecheng County =

County in Henan, China

Zhecheng County 柘城县 Checheng
- County
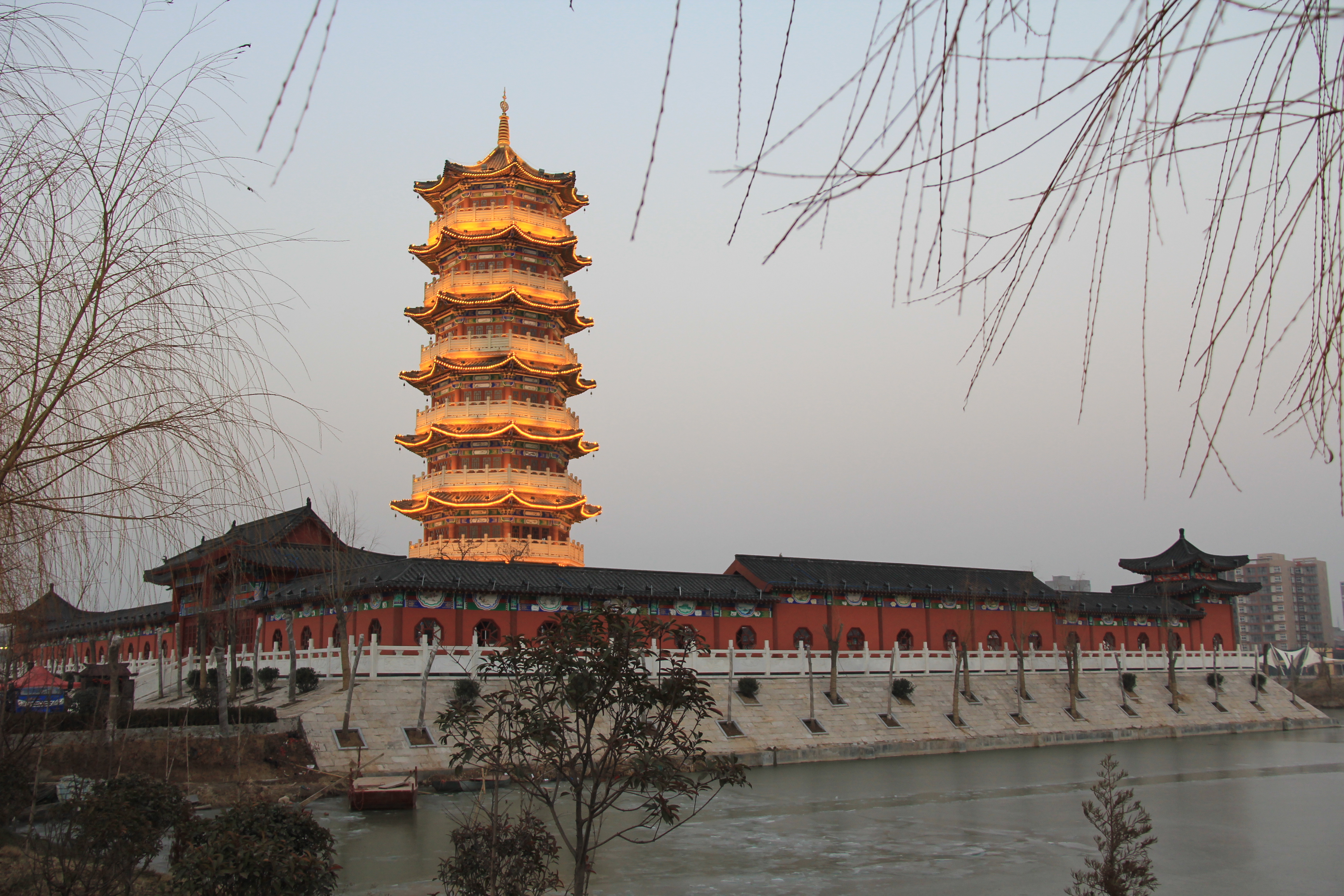

- Location of the seat in Henan
- Coordinates: 34°05′28″N 115°18′21″E
- Country: People's Republic of China
- Province: Henan
- Prefecture-level city: Shangqiu

Area
  - Total: 1,048 km^{2} (405 sq mi)

Population (2019)
  - Total: 685,100
  - Density: 653.7/km^{2} (1,693/sq mi)
- Time zone: UTC+8 (China Standard)
- Postal code: 476200

Zhecheng County (Chinese: 柘城县; pinyin: Zhéchéng Xiàn) is a county under the administration of the prefecture-level city of Shangqiu, in the east of Henan province, People's Republic of China.

Zhecheng is a major center for producing lab diamonds in China. For years, the city's factories focused on producing diamonds for industrial applications, including diamond-tipped cutting tools, drill bits, and diamond-based grinding powders. Since the 2010s, diamond companies in Henan have pivoted to the higher-margin jewelry business. Once roughly processed, the stones are typically shipped to Surat, India where lower labor costs make polishing more economical.

== Administrative divisions ==
As of 2012, this county is divided to seven towns and fourteen townships.

Towns

- Chengguan (城关镇)
- Chenqingji (陈青集镇)
- Qitai (起台镇)
- Huxiang (胡襄镇)
- Cisheng (慈圣镇)
- Anping (安平镇)
- Yuanxiang (远襄镇)

Townships

- Shaoyuan Township (邵元乡)
- Zhangqiao Township (张桥乡)
- Liangzhuang Township (梁庄乡)
- Hong'en Township (洪恩乡)
- Laowangji Township (老王集乡)
- Dawu Township (大仵乡)
- Maji Township (马集乡)
- Niucheng Township (牛城乡)
- Huiji Township (惠济乡)
- Bogang Township (伯岗乡)
- Gangwang Township (岗王乡)
- Shenqiao Township (申桥乡)
- Liyuan Township (李原乡)
- Huangji Township (皇集乡)

== Climate ==
Climate data for Zhecheng, elevation 46 m (151 ft), (1991–2020 normals, extremes 1981–2010)
Month	Jan	Feb	Mar	Apr	May	Jun	Jul	Aug	Sep	Oct	Nov	Dec	Year
Record high °C (°F)	18.3 (64.9)	25.7 (78.3)	27.2 (81.0)	33.4 (92.1)	38.5 (101.3)	40.7 (105.3)	39.9 (103.8)	39.2 (102.6)	36.5 (97.7)	34.6 (94.3)	28.3 (82.9)	20.3 (68.5)	40.7 (105.3)
Mean daily maximum °C (°F)	6.0 (42.8)	9.7 (49.5)	15.2 (59.4)	21.6 (70.9)	26.9 (80.4)	31.8 (89.2)	32.3 (90.1)	30.9 (87.6)	27.4 (81.3)	22.3 (72.1)	14.6 (58.3)	8.1 (46.6)	20.6 (69.0)
Daily mean °C (°F)	0.8 (33.4)	4.0 (39.2)	9.3 (48.7)	15.5 (59.9)	20.9 (69.6)	25.7 (78.3)	27.5 (81.5)	26.2 (79.2)	21.7 (71.1)	16.0 (60.8)	8.7 (47.7)	2.7 (36.9)	14.9 (58.9)
Mean daily minimum °C (°F)	−3.0 (26.6)	−0.3 (31.5)	4.4 (39.9)	10.0 (50.0)	15.4 (59.7)	20.6 (69.1)	23.7 (74.7)	22.7 (72.9)	17.5 (63.5)	11.3 (52.3)	4.3 (39.7)	−1.1 (30.0)	10.5 (50.8)
Record low °C (°F)	−14.7 (5.5)	−16.0 (3.2)	−8.0 (17.6)	−2.4 (27.7)	3.0 (37.4)	11.0 (51.8)	16.5 (61.7)	13.0 (55.4)	6.3 (43.3)	−1.0 (30.2)	−10.6 (12.9)	−17.2 (1.0)	−17.2 (1.0)
Average precipitation mm (inches)	15.5 (0.61)	17.5 (0.69)	31.0 (1.22)	41.7 (1.64)	65.1 (2.56)	96.5 (3.80)	184.1 (7.25)	147.4 (5.80)	75.6 (2.98)	44.2 (1.74)	34.5 (1.36)	14.2 (0.56)	767.3 (30.21)
Average precipitation days (≥ 0.1 mm)	4.2	4.6	5.4	5.7	7.6	7.7	11.0	10.7	8.6	6.1	6.1	4.2	81.9
Average snowy days	3.7	2.5	1.1	0.1	0	0	0	0	0	0	0.8	1.9	10.1
Average relative humidity (%)	68	65	65	68	70	68	80	83	78	72	72	69	72
Mean monthly sunshine hours	124.4	131.1	169.8	197.2	206.2	188.7	183.5	173.7	156.9	156.1	135.7	128.9	1,952.2
Percentage possible sunshine	39	42	45	50	48	44	42	42	43	45	44	42	44
Source: China Meteorological Administration
