= Beijing Astronomical Observatory =

Observatory in China

- Alternative names: BAO
- Location: China
- Coordinates: 40°23′44″N 117°34′33″E
- Altitude: 960 m (3,150 ft)
- Established: 1958
- Website: www.bao.ac.cn
- Telescopes: 0.85m Beijing astronomical observatory telescope; Shahe Station (Beijing Observatory); Xinglong Station

Beijing Astronomical Observatory (BAO) is an observatory in Chaoyang District, Beijing, China. It was founded in 1958 and is part of the Chinese Academy of Sciences. The observatory comprises 5 observing stations. The principal observing site for optical and infrared is Xinglong Station in Xinglong County, Chengde, Hebei Province, which is around 150 kilometres northeast of Beijing.

== Facilities ==
=== Xinglong ===
The Xinglong Observatory, situated at 960 metres above sea level, contains a 2.16-metre reflector telescope (China's largest), and a 1.26-m infrared telescope.

The planned "LAMOST", or Large Sky Area Multi-Object Fiber Spectroscopic Telescope will be located there.

=== Miyun ===
There is also a radio astronomy site in Miyun District, Beijing. It comprises 28 dishes, each 9 metres in diameter. It is used for survey astronomy and is called the Metre-Wave Aperture Synthesis Radio Telescope or "MSRT".
