= 2021 in Mexico =

- Decades: 2000s; 2010s; 2020s
- See also: History of Mexico; List of years in Mexico; Timeline of Mexican history

This article lists events occurring in Mexico during the year 2021. The article lists the most important political leaders during the year at both federal and state levels and will include a brief year-end summary of major social and economic issues. Cultural events, including major sporting events, are also listed. For a more expansive list of political events, see 2021 in Mexican politics and government.

== Incumbents ==
=== President and cabinet ===
- President: Andres Manuel López Obrador MORENA
- Interior: Olga Sánchez Cordero
- Foreign Affairs: Marcelo Ebrard
- Treasury: Arturo Herrera
- Economy
  - Graciela Márquez Colín (until January 5)
  - Tatiana Clouthier Carrillo (starting January 5)
- Environment: Maria Luisa Albores
- Tourism: Miguel Torruco Marqués
- Civil Service: Irma Sandoval-Ballesteros
- Health: Jorge Alcocer Varela
- Development: Román Guillermo Meyer
- Welfare: Javier May Rodríguez
- Culture: Alejandra Frausto Guerrero
- Defense: Luis Cresencio Sandoval
- Navy: José Rafael Ojeda Durán
- Security: Alfonso Durazo Montaño
- Attorney General: Alejandro Gertz Manero

=== Supreme Court ===
- President of the Supreme Court: Arturo Zaldívar Lelo de Larrea

=== Governors ===
- Aguascalientes: Martín Orozco Sandoval PAN
- Baja California: Jaime Bonilla MORENA
- Baja California Sur: Carlos Mendoza Davis PAN
- Campeche: Carlos Miguel Aysa González acting governor PRI
- Chiapas: Rutilio Escandón MORENA
- Chihuahua: Javier Corral Jurado PAN
- Coahuila: Miguel Ángel Riquelme Solís PRI
- Colima: José Ignacio Peralta PRI
- Durango: José Rosas Aispuro PAN
- Guanajuato: Diego Sinhué Rodríguez Vallejo PAN
- Guerrero: Héctor Astudillo Flores PRI
- Hidalgo: Omar Fayad PRI
- Jalisco: Enrique Alfaro Ramírez MC
- Mexico City: Claudia Sheinbaum MORENA
- México (state): Alfredo del Mazo Maza PRI
- Michoacán: Silvano Aureoles Conejo PRD
- Morelos: Cuauhtémoc Blanco PES
- Nayarit: Antonio Echevarría García PAN
- Nuevo León: Jaime Rodríguez Calderón, Independent
- Oaxaca: Alejandro Murat Hinojosa PRI
- Puebla: Miguel Barbosa Huerta MORENA
- Querétaro: Francisco Domínguez Servién PAN
- Quintana Roo: Carlos Joaquín González PRD
- San Luis Potosí: Juan Manuel Carreras PRI
- Sinaloa: Quirino Ordaz Coppel PRI
- Sonora: Claudia Pavlovich Arellano PRI
- Tabasco: Adán Augusto López Hernández MORENA
- Tamaulipas: Francisco Javier García Cabeza de Vaca PAN
- Tlaxcala: Marco Antonio Mena Rodríguez PRI
- Veracruz: Cuitláhuac García Jiménez MORENA
- Yucatán: Mauricio Vila Dosal PAN
- Zacatecas: Alejandro Tello Cristerna PRI

=== LXIV Legislature of the Mexican Congress ===
==== President of the Senate ====
Mónica Fernández Balboa MORENA

==== President of the Chamber of Deputies ====
Dulce María Sauri Riancho PRI

== Monthly events ==
=== January ===
- January 1 – Sixty tourists and crew are rescued when the Canuwa sinks 400 metres (1,300 ft) from Quimixto beach in Puerto Vallarta. No one was injured.
- January 2 – Fireworks and bonfires cause the deaths of two adult women and a preteen girl in Topolobampo, Sinaloa.
- January 4
  - COVID-19 pandemic in Mexico: Dr. Hugo López-Gatell announces that the government has authorized use of the AstraZeneca vaccine.
  - A fisherman dies after his boat collided on December 31, 2020, with the Farley Mowat operated by U.S.-based Sea Shepherd Conservation Society in the Gulf of California. The family says the man's boat was rammed by the Farley Mowat, and the conservationists claim their boat was attacked while removing illegal fishing nets.
- January 6 – Epiphany: Armed members of the Gulf Cartel are photographed delivering toys to children in Villa Progreso, Río Bravo, Tamaulipas. Members of the Jalisco New Generation Cartel (CJNG) distributes toys in Bonifacio Moreno "El Aguaje", Aguililla, Michoacán.
- January 7 – Mexican drug war: Nine killed at a funeral in Celaya, five others killed in other parts of the city.
- January 8
  - Carlos Slim, with a fortune of US$62.1 billion, is the wealthiest person in Mexico, and María Asunción Aramburuzabala (US$5.8 billion), is the wealthiest woman, according to Forbes.
  - COVID-19 pandemic in Mexico: Thirty-five medical students working in a hospital in Ecatepec, State of Mexico, have tested positive; one died on January 4. Students have complained of low salaries, lack of personal protective equipment (PPE), and the fact that they have not been vaccinated but bureaucrats have.
  - A fire in the hotel zone of Tulum, Quintana Roo, burns 36 businesses; 1,000 evacuated.
- January 9 – A fire in the Mexico City Metro Offices kills one, injures 32, and shuts down half the rapid transit lines in the city.
- January 10 – Speaking from Manzanillo, Colima, AMLO says that control of the ports by the Mexican Navy does not mean "militarization" of the ports.
- January 11
  - A running gun battle leaves a police officer and nine gunmen dead in Santa Rosa de Lima (Villagrán), Guanajuato.
  - Mexico and the United States agree to continue border restrictions until February 21.
- January 12 – A law prohibiting corporal punishment or humiliating treatment of children or teenagers goes into effect.
- January 13 – COVID-19 pandemic
  - The Army and Navy begin distribution of 439,725 doses of vaccine for health workers at 879 hospitals across the country.
  - Ciudad Nezahualcóyotl reports 100% occupation in its hospitals, and four patients with serious symptoms of COVID-19 are turned away.
- January 14 – Attorney General Alejandro Gertz Manero announces that General Salvador Cienfuegos, former Secretary of National Defense (2012–2018) will not be charged for drug offenses due to a lack of evidence.
- January 16 – COVID-19 pandemic: For the second day in a row, record-breaking 20,000 new cases are reported. A near-record 1,219 more deaths were also reported.
- January 18 – Twelve bodies whose hands were tied are found along a road in Las Choapas, Veracruz.
- January 21 – The Mexican National Guard stops a truck with 130 Central American migrants in Veracruz.
- January 22
  - AMLO announces that private companies and the states will be allowed to purchase vaccines against COVID-19.
  - Bank accounts of Juan Ramón Collado, former lawyer for ex-president Enrique Peña Nieto, and 22 other Mexican investors, with a value of €2 billion (MXN $48 billion), are seized in Andorra for financial fraud.
- January 23 – Nineteen burned bodies are found in Camargo Municipality, Tamaulipas, likely victims of drug violence.
- January 24 – President López Obrador announces he has COVID-19. Interior Secretary Olga Sánchez Cordero will be taking over for him in his daily news conferences.
- January 25
  - The 2020 Mexican census reveals there are 120 million people in the country with a median age of 29. 1.2 million are foreign born (800,000 in the United States), and 7.4 million people speak an indigenous language. The State of Mexico, with 17 million people, is the most populous; Colima, with 732,000, is the least.
  - COVID-19 pandemic: The death toll passes 150,000.
- January 26 – A pack of dogs attacks and kills two adult kangaroos and a joey in La Pastora Zoo in Monterrey.
- January 30 – Four homes collapse and 35 are near collapse, displacing 50 families in colonia 3 de Octubre, delegación Sánchez Taboada, Tijuana because of heavy rains and flooding. The area was declared high risk in 2019.

=== February ===
- February 2 – CFE pardons thousands of debts going back 26 years worth MXN $11 billion in Tabasco.
- February 3 – Twelve police officers are arrested in the relation to the January 24 massacre of migrants in Camargo Municipality, Tamaulipas.
- February 5 – A riot breaks out at Distribuidor Vial San Antonio in CDMX after police try to break up a demonstration by cyclists who were protesting after a Metrobús ran over a bicyclist. Eleven police officers are arrested.
- February 10 – AMLO and other officials take a fifteen-minute Air Force inaugural flight from the Benito Juárez International Airport to the Santa Lucía Airport.
- February 14 – AMLO pays homage to Vicente Guerrero in Cuilapan de Guerrero, Oaxaca, but he confuses Guerrero and José María Morelos. American civil rights leader Martin Luther King III addresses the need for Mexico to reconcile itself with its past of slavery.
- February 15
  - Temperatures as low as −18 °C (0 °F) are recorded as shortages of natural gas lead to blackouts in Nuevo León, Coahuila, Tamaulipas, and Chihuahua along the Texas border. Five million are left in the dark.
  - Over a dozen people have died in Ciudad Juárez, Chihuahua; Río Bravo and Matamoros, Tamaulipas; and Monterrey, Nuevo León; because of winter storms.
- February 16
  - COVID-19: Mexico passes two million confirmed coronavirus cases and 175,000 deaths, third highest in the world.
  - Sixteen people are arrested for kidnapping in Veracruz, including former beauty queen Laura Mojica Romero, 25.
- February 17 – AMLO says Mexico will increase the use of oil and coal as well as purchasing three shiploads of natural gas to deal with power shortages. Periodic local outages will continue through February 21.
- February 18
  - AMLO asks people to save energy.
  - Ford Motor Company, Volkswagen, and Audi reduce production or close plants due to gas shortages. 120,000 employees of 30 companies in Ciudad Juárez lose their jobs in restaurants and factories due to gas shortages.
- February 19
  - President AMLO announces that rescue of the 65 missing bodies from the 2006 Pasta de Conchos mine disaster has begun.
  - Venezuelan President Nicolás Maduro offers to sell natural gas to Mexico despite the blockade.
- February 21 – A Learjet 45 belonging to the Air Force crashes before landing at El Lencero Airport in Xalapa. 102 aircraft belonging to SEDENA have crashed in since 2006, 48% in the drug war.
- February 24
  - Ceremony honoring 200 years of the Plan de Iguala The plaza of Iguala is plastered with narcomantas (messages from drug cartels) in anticipation of a visit by Presidents López Obrador and Alberto Fernández of Argentina.
  - The FGR issues a warrant to arrest Raúl Beyruti, president of GINgroup, for activities related to organized crime. Beyruti is accused of hiding MXN $34 billion from 92 outsourcing companies.
- February 25 – Twenty-seven migrants seeking asylum in the United States are allowed to leave their makeshift camp in Matamoros, Tamaulipas and cross the border to make their cases. Some people were allowed to cross from Tijuana to San Ysidro, California last week.
- February 26 – A court rules that Rosario Robles′ offer to reveal everything she knows about the Estafa Maestra (″Master Scam″) in return for a reduced sentence is invalid because she refused to repay the MXN $5 billion she is accused of stealing.
- February 27 – The Secretariat of Environment and Natural Resources (SEMARNAT) announced that it may reduce the protected area for the vaquita in the Sea of Cortés as there are only ten of the tiny porpoises left and it may never recuperate its historical range. The announcement comes two months after a fishing boat was deliberately sunk, killing a Mexican fisherman, during Sea Shepherd Conservation Society operations.
- February 28 – Mexico and the European Union (EU) sign an agreement, part of the Arms Trade Treaty (ATT), to control the illicit entry of guns into Mexico. It is estimated that between 250,000 and 280,000 firearms are imported by organized crime every year.

=== March ===
- March 2 – Pemex and Braskem Idesa renegotiate their contract for natural gas, saving Pemex MXN $13.749 billion.
- March 8
  - Metal walls measuring 3 m (9.8 ft) installed in Mexico City's Zócalo to protect historic buildings are turned into a shrine on International Women's Day. Demonstrators also express their rejection of Felix Salgado as a candidate for governor of Guerrero.
  - Sixty-two police officers and 19 civilians are injured (ten seriously) as 20,000 demonstrate in Mexico City. There were demonstrations in every state.
  - Writer and diplomat Andrés Roemer, who has been accused of sexual harassment and rape, seals his mansion in Colonia Roma off from the street with large wooden plates.
- March 9 – Cuauhtémoc Gutiérrez de la Torre (PRI), 52, is arrested and charged with attempted sexual exploitation, false advertising, and criminal conspiracy.
- March 10
  - Traffic is backed up at ten strategic points of the CDMX as members of the Fuerza Amplia de Transportistas (Broad Transportation Force) demand a MXN $2 increase in fares for concessioned minibuses, vans, and buses.
  - Socorro Flores Liera takes the oath as the first Mexican woman to become a Judge of the International Criminal Court (ICC).
- March 18
  - Non-essential travel restrictions are beefed up along both the Mexico-Guautemala and Mexico-U.S. borders until April 21. The United States offers to lend 2.5 doses of AstraZeneca COVID-19 vaccine.
  - At least thirteen police officers are ambushed and killed by a criminal gang in Coatepec Harinas, State of Mexico.
- March 20 – An unidentified Mexican girl, 9, drowns on the Mexican side of the Rio Grande (Soanish: Rio Bravo) near Eagle Pass, Texas.
- March 23 – Three leaders of La Familia Michoacana are identified and 25 others are detained in the March 18 killing of 13 policie officers in the State of Mexico.
- March 25
  - The official number of COVID-19-related deaths is more than 200,000.
  - Day of Indigenous Peoples' Resistance in Champotón, Campeche. AMLO and Bolivian President Luis Arce pay homage to the people of Chakán Putum.
- March 26 – Twenty homes are damaged and 1,100 people are evacuated as a forest fire ravages the ″Sierra de Santiago″, Nuevo León. Seventy-five forest fires rage in 20 states.
- March 27 – Reforma reports that drug kingpin Rafael Caro Quintero has lost his appeal to avoid extradition to the United States for the alleged murder in 1985 of DEA agent Kiki Camarena.
- March 28
  - COVID-19: Data show 294,287-related virus deaths by March 15, 61.4% higher than previously reported. Excess deaths are said to be 417,002.
  - The Valley of Mexico reaches record-high levels of air pollution, especially coarse particulate matter, PM10.

=== April ===
- April 1 – Authorities in Quintana Roo open an investigation into the death of a 12-year-old boy at Xcaret Park.
- April 2 – The Secretary of Security and Citizen Protection in Ecatepec de Morelos dismantles a huachicolero center on more than 7,000 m^{2} (75,000 ft^{2}) containing more than 250 containers of 250,000 L (66,000 US gal).
- April 4 – Daylight saving time in Mexico begins.

=== May ===
- May 3 – At least 23 people are killed when a Mexico City Metro train collapses in the Tezonco–Olivos elevated interstation.
- May 8 – Hundreds rally at the site of a deadly Metro collapse to demand justice after revelations of ignored safety warnings, design problems and allegations of corruption by local officials.
- May 3 – '′Ceremonia de la Cruz Parlante′′ (Ceremony of the End of the Caste War of Yucatán) in Felipe Carrillo Puerto, Quintana Roo.
- May 12 – Seven hundred years since the founding of Tenochtitlan.

=== June ===
- June 6
  - 2021 Mexican legislative election
  - 2021 Mexican local elections
  - 2021 Mexican gubernatorial elections
- June 10
  - The Puebla sinkhole in Zacatapec, Puebla, grows to 400 feet (120 meters) across and 50 feet (15 meters) deep, swallowing a nearby house. The sinkhole first appeared on May 29.
  - Residents of Los Guajes de Ayala, Coyuca de Catalán, Guerrero, use social media to ask for federal help after three days of being held hostage by La Familia Michoacana.
  - After 150 hours of work, the last of seven bodies of coal miners trapped for a week in Múzquiz Municipality, Coahuila, is found.
- June 11 – Texas governor Greg Abbott says he will build a wall along the Texas-Mexico border, including the states of Chihuauhua, Coahuila, Nuevo León, and Tamaulipas. Undocumented immigrants will be arrested for trespassing.

=== August ===
- August 13 – Five hundred years of the history of Mexico City.
- August 24 – Two hundred years since the signing of the Treaty of Córdoba.

=== September ===
- September 7
  - The Mexican Supreme Court unanimously rules that penalties for abortion are unconstitutional, thereby decriminalising it across the whole country.
  - The 2021 Guerrero earthquake, measuring a magnitude 7.0, strikes near Acapulco, killing at least nine.

=== November ===
- November 7 – Mexico toll booth interstate disaster
- November 26 - November 2021 Mexico bus crash

=== December ===
- December 1 – Tula prison break
- December 9 – December 2021 Chiapas truck crash

=== Predicted and scheduled events ===
- TBA – The "Secretariat of Communications and Transportation" (SCT) will change its name to "Secretariat of Infrastructure, Communications and Transportation" (SICT).

== Culture and entertainment ==
=== Art ===
- February 11 – Christie's auctions 37 pieces of prehispanic art (33 from Mexico) for €2.5 million despite objections from the National Institute of Anthropology and History (INAH) that some of the pieces were stolen and others were fake.

=== Literature ===
- February 18–March 1 — The es:Feria Internacional del Libro del Palacio de Minería (International book fair at the Palacio de Minería) is held virtually for the first time.
- February 24 – Long Island University gives a George Polk Awards to the late journalist Regina Martínez Pérez of (Proceso) and to ″Forbidden Stories″.

== Sports ==
- January 31-February 6 — 2021 Caribbean Series at Estadio Teodoro Mariscal in Mazatlan. The games are given a special dispensation from health social distancing standards despite the fact the state of Sonora is on Orange (High) Alert.
- March 1–9 — 2020 Women's Baseball World Cup
- March 15–28 — 2020 CONCACAF Men's Olympic Qualifying Championship in Guadalajara.
- March 25 – The Mexican team made up of Alejandra Valencia, Aída Román, and Ana Paula Vázquez won the gold medal in the Pan-American Archery Championship in Monterrey.
- July–September — 2021 Leagues Cup
- August 24–September 5 — Mexico at the 2020 Summer Paralympics
- TBA
  - 2021 FIVB Volleyball Girls' U18 World Championship
  - Mexico at the 2020 Summer Olympics

== Deaths ==
=== January ===
- January 1
  - Ximena Hita, 21, student and beauty queen (Miss Aguascalientes 2019).
  - Bolívar Roblero Zúñiga, 61, journalist and writer.
- January 5
  - Jorge Alejandro López Rivas, medical intern in Hospital General de Ecatepec "Dr. José María Rodríguez"; COVID-19.
  - Rafael Loyola Díaz, 68, sociologist; COVID-19.
  - Jade Ivone Matu Pérez, 44, housewife from Cancun, burned in femicide.
- January 6
  - Samara Aurora Arroyo Lemarroy, nutrologist (IMSS) in Xalapa, Veracruz; murdered (body found on this date).
  - Antonio Camacho Romero, environmentalist (Asamblea Permanente de los Pueblos de Morelos); COVID-19.
  - Rafael Loyola Díaz, sociologist (UNAM); COVID-19.
  - Mauro Antonio Mendoza Juárez ("El Trup'o"), playwright, theater director, actor; renal failure.
  - Tania Merino García, employee of Veracruz state government; COVID-19 complicated by government negligence.
  - Rafael Monroy Martínez, biologist and environmentalist (Asamblea Permanente de los Pueblos de Morelos); COVID-19.
  - Antonio Valdés Castillo, 91, comedian and actor.
  - "Reyna Zapoteca" band members – Miguel Chávez, 18; Joaquín Antonio, 19; Basilio Antonio Cruz, 19; from Ejutla de Crespo, Oaxaca; shot.
- January 7
  - Manuel Jimenez Guzmán, 71, politician (PRI and 33° Mason; COVID-19.
  - Adriana Beatriz López Rodríguez, 27, housewife and mother from Cosoleacaque, Veracruz; murdered (body found on this date).
- January 9 – Roberto Hernández Vázquez, 54, telenovela producer (Corazón salvaje, Tres mujeres, Amor de barrio); COVID-19.
- January 10 – Ángel Sergio Guerrero Mier, 85, politician, Governor of Durango (PRI 1998–2004).
- January 12 – Juan Antonio Acosta Cano, politician (PAN, deputy in Congress of Guanajuato from Santa Cruz de Juventino Rosas); shot.
- January 14
  - Carlos Armando Biebrich, 81, lawyer and politician, Governor of Sonora (1973–1975), Deputy (1967–1970); COVID-19.
  - José Luis Caballero, 65, Olympic footballer (1976).
  - Jesús Escamilla, politician (53rd Congress of Morelos, founder of Humanist Party (Mexico)); COVID-19.
  - Ivan Trejo, 42, poet (″Premio Nuevo León de Literatura en Poesía″), translator, and plawright.
- January 16
  - William Berzunza, 84, baseball player.
  - Samuel Sea Ilimuri, 57, politician (La Paz, Baja California Sue); COVID-19.
- January 17
  - Jesús Belmont Vázquez, 63, journalist (Grupo Sol).
  - José Clemente Orozco Farías, 60, editor and artist, grandson of José Clemente Orozco; heart attack. (b. 1960).
- January 18
  - Lola Landa, 94, activist and writer; heart attack. (b. 1926).
  - Francisco Daniel Rivera Sánchez, 65, Roman Catholic prelate, Auxiliary Archbishop of Mexico (since 2020); COVID-19.
- January 19 – Gustavo Peña, 78, football player (Monterrey, national team) and manager (Leones Negros); COVID-19.
- January 20 – Gastón Padilla (″Padillita″), 75, actor (b. 1945).
- January 21 – Lupe Vázquez, 75, comedian and actress (Dr. Cándido Pérez).
- January 22
  - José Ángel García, 69–70, actor and television director (La rosa de Guadalupe); pulmonary fibrosis.
  - Martin Rodriguez Sánchez, businessman, Consejo Internacional de Empresarios (COINE); shot.
  - Ráphael Steger Cataño, 74, diplomat.
- January 23
  - Anibal Jr, 50, professional wrestler; COVID-19.
  - Martha Madrigal, 92, poet.
- January 24 – Fidel Heras Cruz, community activist in Jamiltepec District, Oaxaca; shot.
- January 25 – Avelino Méndez Rangel, 62, politician, Deputy (2009–2012); COVID-19.
- January 26
  - Silvia ″G″, 55, nurse in IMSS Hospital No. 36, Coatzacoalcos; died of lung failure after receiving the first dosis of the Pfizer–BioNTech COVID-19 vaccine.
  - José Yolando Jarquín Bustamante, politician, municipal president of Xitlapehua, Oaxaca; COVID-19.
- January 28
  - Rafael Heredia, 84, Olympic basketball player (1964, 1968).
  - Mariana "N", 24, doctor in Ocosingo, Chiapas; raped and choked. (Body found on this date.)
  - Rafael Navarro-Gonzalez, 61, chemist and astrobiologist; COVID-19.
- January 29
  - Beatriz Barba, 92, first woman to earn a degree in archaeology in Mexico, member of the Mexican Academy of Sciences (b. 1928).
  - Baruch Pérez León, police chief of San Juan Evangelista, Veracruz; tortured and shot.
- January 30
  - María de Jesús Chávez, politician (PRI), municipal president of Tasquillo, Hidalgo; COVID-19.
  - Ricardo Esponda Gaxiola, businessman (president of Coparmex in Morelos) and politician (PAN); COVID-19.
  - Rafael Gallardo García, 93, Bishop of Roman Catholic Diocese of Linares (1974–1987) and Roman Catholic Diocese of Tampico (1987–2003).
- January 31
  - Genaro Domínguez Maldonado – lawyer, farm leader, and indigenous rights activist, participant in Mexican Movement of 1968 and member of Consejo Mundial de Pueblos Indios.
  - José Luis Muñoz Soto, politician (MORENA), deputy in Hidalgo; COVID-19.
  - Aparicio Reyes, municipal president Santos Reyes Tepejillo, Oaxaca; COVID-19.
  - Genaro "La Burra" Torres, 81, footballer.

=== February ===
- February 4
  - Antonio Azúcar Hernández, 44, Salvadoran diplomat, consul in Tapachula, Chiapas; COVID-19.
  - Leobardo Ramos Lázaro, politician, municipal president of Chahuites, Juchitán District, Oaxaca; shot.
- February 5 - Francisco "El Potrillo" Avilán, 73, footballer.
- February 7
  - Oscar González Loyo, 61, comic book artist, (founder and director of ¡Ka-Boom! Estudio and creator of Karmatrón y los transformables; heart attack.
  - J. Guadalupe Huerta, 78, photographer and boxer.
  - Ricardo Silva Elizondo, 67, singer and actor (Destilando Amor, El premio mayor, Amigas y Rivales); COVID-19.
- February 8
  - Servando Cano Rodríguez, 78, singer-songwriter and producer.
  - Octavio Misael Lorenzo Morales, politician, mayor of Atzacan, Veracruz; COVID-19.
  - Beatriz Yamamoto Cázarez, 63, politician, Deputy (since 2012); COVID-19.
- February 11 – Gilberto Ortiz Parra, politician MORENA, precandidate for mayor of Úrsulo Galván, Veracruz; shot. Two police officers also died.
- February 12
  - Ernesto Herrera, director and co-founder of Guanajuato International Film Festival (GIFF); COVID-19.
  - Rodrigo Mejía, 45, soap opera actor (El juego de la vida, Mundo de fieras).
- February 14
  - Hugo Robles, 68, broadcaster and journalist.
  - Catalina Romero, nurse (ISSSTE Zapata, Morelos); COVID-19.
- February 15
  - Lucía Guilmáin, 83, actress (Las fuerzas vivas, Length of War, and Darker Than Night); COVID-19.
  - Gladys Merlín Castro, politician (PRI), former mayor of Cosoleacaque, Veracruz; shot
- February 16
  - Enrique Chávez Nieto, doctor (IMSS Hospital General de Ginecobstetricia, Tlalnepantla, State of Mexico); COVID-19.
  - Ángel Leyva Espinosa, doctor (ISSSTE Zapata, Morelos); COVID-19.
- February 17
  - Juan Arvizu, journalist (El Universal (Mexico City); COVID-19.
  - Bruno Vogt, 26, bullfighter; cancer.
- February 18 – Violeta Dávalos, 52, operatic soprano, peritonitis.
- February 21
  - Radamés Salazar Solorio, politician (MORENA, federal senator from Morelos
  - Six members of the Air Force; plane crash in Xalapa
- February 22 – Miguel Arsenio Lara Sosa, 68, politician, member of the Congress of Yucatán (1998–2001), heart attack.
- February 23 – Luz María Puente, 97, pianist.
- February 24 - Germán "El Tamal" Ascencio, footballer (C.D. Oro).
- February 25 – Ignacio Sánchez Cordero, politician (MORENA and PVEM), candidate for mayor of Puerto Morelos Municipality, Quintana Roo; shot.
- February 28
  - Gerardo Valtierra, sportscaster (Televisa); COVID-19
  - Alfonso Hernández, chronicler (Tepito Arte Acá)

=== March ===
- March 1 – Julio César Galindo Pérez, 54, businessman (Coparmex in San Luis Potosí); shot
- March 2 - Jorge "El Coco" Gómez, 74, footballer
- March 4
  - Yuriel Armando González Lara, politician (PRI), candidate for mayor of Nuevo Casas Grandes Municipality, Chihuahua; assassinated.
  - Melquiades Vázquez Lucas (″El Pantera″), politician (PRI), candidate for mayor of La Perla, Veracruz; assassinated.
- March 5
  - Baltazar Gaona Sánchez, 80, politician (PRD), five-time mayor of Tarímbaro, Michoacán; COVID-19
  - Enrique González Rojo Jr., 92, writer and philosopher.
- March 6 – Cecilia Yépiz Reyna, former Secretary of Urban Development and Ecology of Nogales Municipality, Sonora; murdered (body found on this date)
- March 8
  - ″Cepillín″ (Ricardo González Gutiérrez), 75, clown and television personality; respiratory problems
  - Mario "El Churumbel" Rey, footballer (Club León).
- March 9
  - Félix Coronado Hernández, 56, union trade leader.
  - Federico Fabregat, 46, visual artist, writer and musician.
  - Ernesto San Román, 75, bullfighter.
  - Isela Vega, 81, actress (Bring Me the Head of Alfredo Garcia, winner of two Ariel Awards—La Viuda Negra and Herod's Law); cancer.
- March 10
  - Citlaly Malpica, 29, poet; cancer.
  - Pedro Morales González, journalist (Código Tlaxcala); diabetes.
  - Alfredo Sevilla, mayor of Casimiro Castillo, Jalisco, on leave. (body found on this date)
- March 11 – Carlos Rocha Pineda, 40, historian and cultural promoter.
- March 13
  - José Antonio Rodríguez, 59, photography historian.
  - Arturo Castro, 82, singer and composer (Los Hermanos Castro).
- March 14
  - Leonel Luna Estrada, politician; car accident.
  - Eulalio Cervantes, 52, composer and saxophonist (Maldita Vecindad); COVID-19.
  - Ernesto Rubio del Cueto, 84, lawyer and businessman.
- March 15 - Emiliano González, 65, writer.
- March 16
  - Miguel Ángel Bonilla, doctor (AHMSA); COVID-19.
  - Aarón Gamal, 62, former footballer; heart attack.
  - Ernesto Francisco Valdés Cepeda, 60, politician, former mayor of Arteaga, Coahuila; COVID-19.
- March 17
  - Jesús Manuel "Chumel" Gómez, 73, cultural promoter; cancer.
  - Vicente Rojo Almazán, 89, Spanish-born Mexican painter, graphic designer and sculptor.
- March 19
  - Isabel Castillo Orta, craftswoman.
  - Heriberto López, softball player.
  - Ernesto Mallard, 88, sculptor and painter; cardiorespiratory arrest.
- March 20
  - Rafael Jacome Oropeza, holder of the Captaincy of the Port of Nuevo Vallarta.
  - Ivonne Gallegos, politician (PAN), candidate for mayor of Ocotlán de Morelos; shot.
- March 22 - Sandalio Sainz de la Maza, politician (PRI), candidate for mayor of Tlalpan; COVID-19.
- March 23 – Alberto Ciurana, 60, TV producer (Televisa, TV Azteca); COVID-19.
- March 24
  - Francisco "Chico" Andrade, 92, singer.
  - Enrique de la Garza Toledo, 74, sociologist, researcher, professor and academic.
  - Mayco Fabián Tapia Quiñones, 42, politician; shot.
- March 25 - Jorge A. Bustamante, 83, human rights of migrants defender and founder of El Colegio de la Frontera Norte (Colef).
- March 26 – José Refugio Torres López, farm leader (El Magueyal, Tacoaleche, Zacatecas); COVID-19.
- March 27
  - Emmanuelle Cueto Ramos, 31, Catholic priest and influencer; cancer.
  - Pablo Mulás del Pozo, scientist and researcher; COVID-19.
  - Victoria Salazar, migrant originally from El Salvador; feminicide
- March 28
  - Javier Molina, 78, poet and journalist (La Jornada); liver problems.
  - Karla Fernanda Salas Salazar, 20, football player (VQueens Saltillo).
- March 29
  - Salvador Lizárraga, 88, musician (La Original Banda el Limón).
  - Germán Orozco Sarro, businessman (Ultramar and Aqua World).
  - Inocente Peñaloza, 82, chronicler and journalist.
  - Rafael Rosales Coria, 59, magistrate, president of the Court of Administrative Justice of the State of Michoacán (TJAM); COVID-19.
- March 30
  - Leobardo Aguilar Flores, politician (PVEM), mayor of Soltepec; COVID-19.
  - Sara Monar, actress (Como Dice el Dicho, La Rosa de Guadalupe); COVID-19.
- March 31
  - Leobardo Aguilar Flores, municipal president of Soltepec, Puebla; COVID-19.
  - Luis de Antuñano, 82, painter.
  - Alejandro Galicia Juárez, politician (PRD), Candidate for alderman in Apaseo el Grande, Guanajuato; shot.

=== April ===
- April 1
  - Arturo González Orduño, 61, journalist (Grupo Fórmula).
  - Jaime Jiménez Ruiz, environmentalist; fifth person murdered for opposing construction of a hydroelectric plant on Río Verde.
- April 2
  - Gonzalo Elías Zopiyactle Colohua, 48, politician, former mayor of Mixtla, Puebla; murdered. (body found on this date)
  - Marco Antonio Cruz, 64, photographer.
  - Chepina Peralta, 90, chef and TV personality.
  - Gilberto "Sahuaripa" Valenzuela, singer.
- April 3 - Chepina Peralta, 90, chef and television personality.
- April 4
  - Irene Hernández de Jesús, 62, activist and politician.
  - Francisco Haghenbeck, 56, writer and comics screenwriter; COVID-19.
- April 5
  - Miguel Ángel Aguilar López, judge and academic; COVID-19.
  - José Antonio Bátiz Vázquez, 74, historian.
- April 6
  - Alicia Cardona, 66, model and beauty queen (Miss Guanajuato 1978).
  - Leticia Colín, politician, precandidate for mayor of Cuautitlán; diabetes.
  - René Coulomb Bosc, 76, sociologist and urban planner.
  - Adriana Tavira García, journalist (Periódico Impulso); COVID-19.
- April 9
  - Pablo "Curro" Cruz, 57, bullfighter.
  - Rodolfo Disner, 91, plastic artist.
  - Mariana Navarro, singer (Micro Chips) and theater actress (Los tenis rojos); COVID-19.
  - Becky Treves, food stylist.
- April 10 - Juan Carlos Díaz Aragón, writer, humanist, historian, interpreter of pre-Columbian codices, philanthropist, and teacher of Mexican Literature.
- April 11 - Arcadio Huchim, radio news anchorman; COVID-19.
- April 12
  - El Engendro, 60, wrestler; respiratory failure.
  - Carlos González Lobo, architect and professor.
  - Luis Vargas, politician (PAN), former mayor of Irapuato.
  - Roberto Velasco, 63, oceanologist; cancer.
- April 13
  - Fernando Tapia Rivera, professor (Universidad Autónoma de Querétaro) and writer; heart attack.
  - Rogelio Torres Ortega, politician, mayor of Tepoztlán; COVID-19.
- April 15
  - Armando Cuellar Moreno, politician, candidate for mayor of Cuauhtémoc; COVID-19.
  - Patricio Castillo, 81, actor (La mexicana y el güero, Mi querida herencia and Mi marido tiene más familia).
  - Jorge Fitch, baseball player.
- April 17 - Marcelino Aceves Zamora, footballer.
- April 18
  - Alejandro Aguirre, journalist; COVID-19.
  - Alicia Arellano Tapia, 86, politician.
  - Ian Legorreta, 19, soccer player (Atlético San Luis); car accident.
- April 20 - Toño Velasco, puppeteer.
- April 21
  - Blanca Alfaro Vázquez, politician (MORENA), candidate for federal deputy; heart attack.
  - Enrique Becker, actor (Mundo de juguete, La casa de las flores, Lazos de amor).
- April 22 - Toni Rodríguez, 51, dubbing actress; cancer.
- April 24
  - Francisco Gerardo Rocha Chávez, politician (PVEM), candidate for local deputy; shot.
  - Sergio Esquivel, 74, singer-songwriter.
  - Manuel Guízar, actor.
  - Blanca López, politician, candidate for mayor of Montemorelos; car accident.
- April 25 - Alex Quintero, singer.
- April 26 - Ramiro Ayala Garza, 75, politician (PRI), candidate for mayor of Santa Catarina, Nuevo León.
- April 27
  - Diana Pérez, 51, dubbing actress.
  - Jesús Rejón Aguayo, 95, baseball player, manager, advisor.
- April 28 - Héctor "Cuirio" Santoyo, 67, former soccer player (Esmeraldas del León).
- April 29 - José Francisco Gallardo Rodríguez, 74, military officer and prisoner of conscience; COVID-19.
- April 30
  - José Garfias, 79, cattle businessman.
  - Armando Nava, 80, painter.

=== May ===
- May 2 - José Octavio García Larrañaga, cyclist; hit by a car.
- May 3 - Felipe Zambrano Páez, bullfighter, politician.
- May 6 - Osvaldo Trejo, 32, dubbing actor.
- May 7
  - Luis Mario Lamadrid Moreno, 86, announcer and journalist.
  - Ramón Mimiaga Padilla, playwright, screenwriter and cultural promoter.
- May 9 - Julio Verdugo, 23, Regional Mexican singer, shot.
- May 10
  - Miguel "El Avión" Arellano Moreno, 80, basketball player; cancer.
  - Valentín Contreras del Toro, politician (PT), candidate for mayor of Armería, Colima; COVID-19.
  - Dragón, eland antelope from the San Juan de Aragón Zoo; cardio-respiratory failure.
  - Gustavo Mazón Lizárraga, 79, businessman.
- May 13 - Abel Murrieta Gutiérrez, 58, politician and lawyer (LeBarón and Langford families massacre), deputy (2015–2018), shot.
- May 14
  - Jaime Garza, 67, actor (Navajeros, Missing, The Falcon and the Snowman), complications from diabetes.
  - Ivonne Govea, actress and vedette.
- May 16 - Amín Zarur Ménez, politician, former mayor of Acapulco.
- May 17
  - Margarita Domínguez Ocampo, candidate for municipal president of Mazatlán, Sinaloa; cancer.
  - Eduardo Fuhrken Pinelli, businessman.
  - René Cardona III, 59, film director (Vacaciones de terror).
- May 19
  - Víctor Hugo Pérez Cruz, ballet director.
  - Guillermo 'Tigre' Sepúveda, 87, soccer player.
  - Francisco Verdayes, 55, journalist; COVID-19.
  - Guillermo Sepúlveda, 86, footballer (Guadalajara, Oro, national team).
- May 20 - Roberto González, 68, musician and composer; cancer.
- May 21 - Álvaro Francisco Carreño, 77, businessman.
- May 22 - Enrique Capetillo González, politician.
- May 23 - Hugo Delgado Lomelí, entrepreneur and tourism promoter.
- May 24 - Marcelino Gómez Galván, footballer (Atlas F.C.).
- May 25 -
  - Alma Rosa Barragán, candidate for mayor of Moroleón; shot.
  - Juan Máximo Martínez, 74, Olympic long-distance runner (1968, 1972); cancer.
- May 27
  - Víctor Manuel Bautista López, politician (PRD), former deputy and municipal president of Neza.
  - Jesús Manuel Vargas García, lawyer and politician.
- May 29 - Gilberto Monreal Valenzuela, 90, musician.
- May 30
  - José Alfredo Chepe Contreras Méndez, politician, candidate to municipal president of Bacalar; car accident.
  - Nieves Orozco, 98, model.
  - Anastasio Villareal Díaz, politician, candidate to local deputy.
- May 31 - Rubén García Castillo, radio host.

=== June ===
- June 1
  - Manuel Colín Bolaños 'Rolo', punk singer, vocalist of Atoxxxico.
  - Steph Gómez, 30, Jujutsu athlete and television personality (Exatlón México); COVID-19.
  - Okoye, tigress (Chapultepec Zoo); acute respiratory disorder.
- June 2
  - Elodia Cárdenas Gómez, politician (PVEM), candidate for a local deputy.
  - Pasión Kristal, 45, luchador; drowning.
- June 3 - Carlos Cortez Briones, 54, politician (MORENA), candidate for mayor of Mier y Noriega.
- June 4 - Maribel Martínez Altamirano, politician (PRI).
- June 5
  - Ángel or Demonio, wrestler; COVID-19.
  - Abraham Márquez Barrón, politician, candidate for a local deputy.
  - Olga Rinzo, 89, actress.
- June 7
  - Ricardo Almaraz, politician (MC), candidate for supplementary receiver in Tepotzotlán, State of Mexico; shot.
  - Ermilo Torre Gamboa, 97, painter.
- June 9 - Nancy Gutiérrez, 27, writer; car accident.
- June 10
  - Aida Patricia Torres Puente, journalist.
  - Betty Hernandez Ruiz, 29, doctor (Progreso, Hidalgo); strangled (the police say it was suicide but the case is being investigated as a feminicide.
- June 12
  - Juan López Palacios, politician, elected municipal president of Xoxocotla, Veracruz; heart attac.
  - José María Morales del Bosque, architect.
- June 13 - Mauricio Molina, 62, writer.
- June 15 - José Santos Rodríguez, musician and singer (Grupo Pegasso).
- June 16 -
  - Raúl Abraham Mafud, 59, businessman.
  - Antonio Ochoa Millán, 53, businessman.
  - Alfonso Ponce de León, journalist.
- June 19 - Juan Guerra, rock musician and composer.
- June 21 - Rosario Guajardo, painter.
- June 22 - Gravedad, rapper; cancer.
- June 24 - Gustavo Rodríguez Zárate, 74, defender of migrant rights; cancer.
- June 25
  - Antonio Helguera, 55, cartoonist (La Jornada).
  - Leopoldo Solís, 92, economist and writer.
- Jun 26 - Laura Fernanda Meraz Madrid, actress.
- June 27
  - Manuel Balam, 49, journalist; COVID-19.
  - Alma Carmina Rosas, journalist.
  - Juan Manuel "Gato" Lemus, 87, former soccer player (Club América).
  - Silvia Ortiz Echániz, 81, anthropologist, researcher and writer.
  - Emilio Reyes, sports producer.
- June 28 - Julián Guerra López, 87, baseball player and promoter.
- June 29
  - Carlos Pedro Mandujano Vázquez, 77, head of the Coordination of Civil Protection in Michoacán.
  - Raúl de la Fuente, 74, dubbing actor.

=== July ===
- July 3 - Abelardo Alvarado Alcántara, 87, Roman Catholic prelate, auxiliary bishop of Mexico (1985–2008).
- July 4 - José Manuel Zamacona, 69, singer (Los Yonic's); COVID-19.
- July 5 - César González Alarcón, 66, sculptor; brain tumor.
- July 6 - Renato Adrián Peñalosa Bojórquez, 41, journalist (Grupo Megamedia); COVID-19.
- July 7
  - Sara Esther Muza Simón, politician.
  - Beatriz Zamora, politician (PRD).
- July 8
  - Zette Voltage, drummer (Los Abominables, Six Million Dollar Weirdo); cancer.
  - Alfonso Zayas, 80, actor (The Loving Ones, The Pulque Tavern, Carnival Nights).
- July 10 - Luis Fernando Granados, 52, historian; cancer.
- July 11
  - Jesús Arroyo, 87, restaurant entrepreneur.
  - Armando Corona Radillo, 54, businessman (Grupo Corona) and politician, mayor of Tonaya (2004-2006).
- July 12 - Juan Carlos Merla, 70, painter.
- July 13
  - Mario Álvaro Cartagena, 69, communist militant and guerrilla (Liga Comunista 23 de Septiembre), complications from surgery.
  - Teresa Muriel Pons, activist; heart attack.
- July 14
  - Óscar Domínguez Escobar, bullfighter.
  - Salvador Pérez Rincón, 88, politician (PRI).
- July 15
  - Juan Manuel De la Rosa, painter, engraver, and ceramicist.
  - Salvador Enríquez, 76, former soccer player (Club León, Unión de Curtidores).
- July 16
  - Jorge Romero Romero, 56, politician, deputy (2003–2006, 2009–2012).
  - Néstor Valdez, singer (La Acelerada); shot.
- July 18
  - Luis Raúl Berriel Valdós, 80, researcher.
  - Arturo Casanova, dubbing, television and theater actor.
  - Héctor Carrizosa, 67, painter.
  - Eugenio Gómez Lemus, journalist; COVID-19.
  - Miguel Hernández Labastida, 85, politician.
  - Didier Roger Lugo Briceño, 38, businessman.
  - Nacho Pérez Solano, sculptor.
- July 19
  - Abraham Mendoza, 43, journalist; shot.
  - Martha Murillo Araujo, 95, activist.
- July 20 - Jorge Hernández Guerra, 59, politician; heart attack.
- July 21 - Abel Ramírez Águilar, 78, sculptor.
- July 22
  - Héctor Joaquín Carrillo Ruiz, former Oaxaca Attorney General; COVID-19.
  - Ricardo López Jiménez, 47, journalist; shot.
- July 23 - Juan Ramón Valenzuela, television host.
- July 24
  - Gerardo Cantú, 87, painter, engraver and muralist.
  - Abelardo Islas Márquez, politician; car accident.
  - Francisco Noriega Nicolás, visual artist; COVID-19.
  - Blanca Estela Treviño García, writer.
- July 25
  - Mario Casarrubias Salgado, leader of the Guerreros Unidos cartel; COVID-19.
  - Jesús Cordero Mérida, 23, soccer player.
  - Tony Gutiérrez, CEO of American Airlines.
  - Ramiro Guzmán Zayas, 33, musician (Grupo La Concentración); COVID-19.
  - Juan Manuel Montellano Prieto, politician.
  - Norma Alicia Riego Azuara, President of the College of Nurses in Veracruz.
  - Sergio Villarreal, 73, painter; COVID-19.
- July 26
  - Petra Betrado Mejorado, Head of the State Executive Commission for Attention to Victims in Durango; COVID-19.
  - Brazo de Plata, 58, professional wrestler (WWE).
  - Gustavo Carrillo, 36, dubbing actor; COVID-19.
  - René Juárez Cisneros, 65, economist and politician; COVID-19.
- July 28 - Enrique José Vidal Herrera, 81, entertainment journalist, entrepreneur and art promoter.
- July 29
  - José Gómez Cervantes, 65, long-distance runner.
  - Francisco "Paco" Bulnes, 61, businessman, CEO (Solmar Group); cancer.
- July 30
  - Evergisto Gamboa Díaz, politician, mayor of Santiago Choápam, Oaxaca; COVID-19.
  - Peter Lozano, businessman; COVID-19.
  - Sammy Pérez, 65, actor (Instructions Not Included, XHDRbZ); COVID-19.
  - Martha Sánchez Néstor, 47, indigenous feminist leader; COVID-19.
- July 31
  - Jorge Ángel Aguilar Heredia, 62, businessman (Grupo Coliman).
  - Josué Rosales Santos, 71, art and culture promoter.

=== August ===
- August 1
  - Jorge Belsaguy, businessman (Stulz México).
  - María del Rosario Díaz Serrano, 65, President of the municipal DIF of Técpan de Galeana.
- August 2
  - Lilia Aragón, 84, actress (De frente al sol, Más allá del puente, Velo de novia) and politician, deputy (2004-2006).
  - Juan Antonio Mendoza Pedroza, politician, elected municipal president of Malinalco; COVID-19.
  - Antonio de la Torre Villalpando, 69, footballer (América, Puebla, national team).
  - Diego Rosas Anaya, 31, politician, member-elect of the Congress of the State of Mexico, heart attack.
- August 3
  - Manuel Gil Vara, 84, historian and politician.
  - María Teresa Marú Mejía, 62, politician, deputy (since 2018); COVID-19.
- August 4
  - Zelá Brambillé, 27, writer and novelist; COVID-19.
  - Roberto Gutiérrez Morales, 83, businessman and politician; COVID-19.
- August 5
  - Gabriel Gutiérrez Mojica, 83, stage actor, playwright and director.
  - José Antonio Morales, 81, actor, flamenco dancer, theater director and producer; stroke.
  - Arturo Reyes Moreno, 79, singer; cardiorespiratory arrest.
  - Augusto Solórzano López, 72, journalist and radio announcer.
- August 6
  - Refugio Javier Kukin Carmona, musician (Grupo Liberación).
  - Fernando A. Sánchez Ortiz, chef.
- August 7
  - Jorge Alejandro "El Choco Tabasqueño", 67, singer and comedian.
  - Manuel López, singer (Psicofonía); COVID-19.
  - Isabel Martínez, 75, actress and comedian, heart attack.
  - Paulino Partida, actor, director and screenwriter; COVID-19.
- August 8
  - Ernesto del Blanco Mota, businessman.
  - Hipólito Reyes, 74, Archbishop of Xalapa.
  - Fernando 'Muñeca' Santillán, soccer player (Club América).
- August 9
  - Abelino Barrientos Castro, politician, elected mayor of Isla, Veracruz; COVID-19.
  - María Elena Chapa, 77, politician and women's rights activist; cancer.
  - Octavio González, communicator and publicist; COVID-19.
  - Sumiko Mitzuko, singer and television and radio host; COVID-19.
- August 10
  - Walter Astié-Burgos, diplomat.
  - Rafael Moreno Valle Suárez, 78, businessman; cancer.
- August 11 - Rosa María Bojalil "Corinna," singer.
- August 12 - David Alvídrez, 30, anthropologist and journalist.
- August 13
  - Fernando Alba Andrade, 102, physicist, researcher and academic.
  - Martín Lara Reyna, photojournalist; COVID-19.
  - Obed Meza, politician (PRI); COVID-19.
- August 14
  - Germán Gallegos Cruz, politician and activist; COVID-19.
  - Ramón Serrano Girón, politician, municipal president of Aquila.
- August 16
  - Apolonio Albavera, politician (MORENA); COVID-19.
  - Fernando Curiel Defossé, 79, writer and researcher.
  - José Miguel Ponce de León, 31, television producer.
- August 17
  - Julio César Becerril, politician, former municipal president of Ixtapan de la Sal; COVID-19.
  - Juan Manuel Díaz Andrade, 52, sports journalist.
  - Leopoldo Gómez Corona, politician, elected mayor of Maltrata; COVID-19.
  - Clodomiro Siller Acuña, 82, priest and indigenous communities advisor; COVID-19.
- August 18 - Irak Vargas, politician.
- August 19
  - Gustavo Ortiz Espinoza, journalist; COVID-19.
  - Jacinto Romero Flores, journalist; shot.
- August 20
  - Fernando Ruiz, 79, film director.
  - Manuel Sánchez de la Madrid, journalist; COVID-19.
- August 21
  - Rubén Dueñas Escobedo, journalist; heart attack.
  - Roberto Martínez, union leader and civil servant.
- August 22
  - Álvaro Blancarte, 87, painter and sculptor.
  - Julio Esponda Ugartechea, lawyer and bullfighting promoter.
- August 23
  - Elda Maceda, 66, journalist; cancer.
  - Rosita Quintana, 96, Argentine-Mexican actress (Susana, The Price of Living, To the Four Winds) and singer, complications from thyroid surgery.
  - Arturo Segovia Flores, 51, activist; COVID-19.
  - Frankie Val, 50, runner; COVID-19.
- August 24
  - Guillermo 'Puskas' García, former footballer (Club León).
  - Elia Hernández Núñez, 59, politician, deputy (2006–2009).
- August 25
  - Miguel Ángel Flores Rodríguez, 46, football referee.
  - José Márquez Pérez, architect.
- August 26 - José Luis Flores Subiaur, politician, elected mayor of Texistepec, Veracruz; cancer.
- August 28
  - Cruz López Aguilar, 74, politician.
  - Eduardo Torres Zorrill, 30, businessman.
- August 29
  - Ramiro Gracia Bernal, 87, journalist; COVID-19.
  - Kiko Macanudo, musician (Grupo Marrano).
- August 30
  - Ever Montoya, basketball player.
  - Taurino Vargas Aguilar, singer (Los Panchos).
- August 31 - Francisco Monterrosa, 53, visual artist, muralist and engraver; COVID-19.

=== September ===
- September 1 - Miguel Chalita Siade, businessman.
- September 2
  - Enrique Diaz Moreno, professional wrestler; COVID-19.
- September 5
  - Gustavo de Hoyos Guevara, 78, lawyer and businessman.
  - Epifanio Leyva, 84, boxer.
  - Luis Octavio Porte Petit Moreno, lawyer and academic.
- September 6
  - Enrique González Pedrero, 91, politician, senator (1970–1976) and governor of Tabasco (1982–1987).
  - Margarita Pérez Pérez, curandera and activist.
- September 7
  - Eduardo "Lalo" Elorduy, 60, pelota player.
  - Andrés Pardavé, actor (Club de Cuervos, La Rosa de Guadalupe, Como dice el dicho); COVID-19.
  - Martha Patricia Ramírez Lucero, 69, politician.
- September 8
  - Abraham Chavelas, 42, sound artist, cultural promoter and social activist; COVID-19.
  - Juan Guillermo López Soto, 74, Bishop of Cuauhtémoc Madera; COVID-19.
  - Ricardo Tapia Ibargüengoytia, 81, surgeon, biochemist, researcher, professor and academic.
- September 9
  - Tino Contreras, 97, jazz composer.
  - Saúl Cuautle Quechol, 55, Ibero-American University rector; COVID-19.
- September 10
  - Marcos Barrón, actor, theater director and cultural promoter; COVID-19.
  - Sergio Jiménez, academic and researcher.
  - Orlando Ortiz, 76, writer.
- September 12
  - René Janhekt, 74, television and dubbing actor.
  - Francisco Alfonso Larqué Saavedra, biologist, researcher and academic.
- September 14
  - Honorato Álvarez Campos, lawyer and politician (PVEM).
  - Guillermo Rodrigo Teodoro Ortiz Mondragón, 74, bishop.
  - Antonio Francisco Pérez, politician, municipal president of Hermenegildo Galeana, Puebla.
- September 15 - Fernando Chávez Ruvalcaba, 88, Bishop of Zacatecas; COVID-19.
- September 16 - Juan Carlos Novelo, 62, drummer (Caifanes).
- September 17 - Manuel Mejido, 89, journalist.
- September 18
  - José Hernández-Claire, 72, photojournalist.
  - Francisco Soto, baseball player; COVID-19.
- September 19 - Eloy Hernández Mendoza, 50, theater producer.
- September 20
  - Belinda Aguirre, 71, businesswoman.
  - Mario Bolio García, 78, composer; COVID-19.
  - Milo Ibánez, 44, yourtuber.
  - Francisco Solano Urías, politician.
- September 21
  - Evelia Chapa, businesswoman.
  - La Prieta Linda, 88, singer and actress (Valente Quintero).
- September 23
  - Sócrates Campos Lemus, 1968 Student Movement leader.
  - Rosario Sosa Parra, activist and writer.
- September 24 - Ángel Ortuño, 52, poet.
- September 25
  - Ramiro Garza, 91, journalist.
  - Ignacio Moreno, 59, basketball coach; COVID-19.
- September 26 - Agustín González Estrella, Governor of Vícam; COVID-19.
- September 29 - José Alfredo Jiménez Jr., 63, composer and producer.
- September 30 - Xicoténcatl Leyva Mortera, 81, politician, governor of Baja California (1983–1989); lung cancer.

=== October ===
- October 2 - Rodrigo Ruy Arias Ibañez, musician, writer and professor.
- October 3 - José Luis Lamadrid, 91, former football forward (Club Necaxa) and commentator.
- October 4 - Sabás Ponce, 84, footballer.
- October 5 - Jesús Del Río Ramírez, 67, actor, theater director, theater professor and plastic artist.
- October 6 - Otilia Larrañaga, 89, actress (The Price of Living) and dancer.
- October 9
  - Rodrigo de la Riva Robles, lawyer and political figure.
  - Fernando Elías Calles Álvarez, politician (PRI).
- October 11 - Javier Ruán, 81, actor.
- October 13 -
  - Indio Comanche, professional wrestler; cerebral stroke.
  - Eduardo Meza, 60, television producer.
- October 15
  - Andrés García, cultural promoter.
  - Alfredo López Austin, 85, historian.
  - Jesús Pérez, 18, boxer.
- October 16
  - Benito Camarillo Mirón, politician, former candidate to municipal president of Quecholac; cancer.
  - Felipe Cazals, 84, film director (The Garden of Aunt Isabel, Canoa: A Shameful Memory, Bajo la metralla), screenwriter and producer.
  - María Esther Ortiz Salazar, 85, nuclear physicist.
  - Rodolfo Reyes Cortés, 85, choreographer and dancer.
- October 17 - Miguel Aldana Ibarra, former director of Interpol in Mexico who was indicted in the United States for the killing of DEA agent Enrique Camarena.
- October 18
  - Cristóbal Hernández, 85, chronicler and announcer.
  - Pablo López Morales, singer.
  - Miguel Palmer, 78, actor; heart attack.
- October 20 - Armando Cajero, 30, chef.
- October 22
  - Jorge Marshall, musician and composer.
  - Diana Negrete, 79, singer and author.
- October 24
  - Esteban Hernández Silva "Plata", 60, wrestler; heart attack.
  - Angel Trinidad Ferreira, 90, journalist.
- October 27 - Javier Sahagún, sports commentator.
- October 28
  - Óscar Cadena, 75, television host.
  - Fredy López Arévalo, journalist; killed.
- October 29
  - Kukulkán, racehorse.
  - Octavio Ocaña, 22, actor (Vecinos, Lola: Once Upon a Time, La mexicana y el güero); shot.
- October 31
  - Alfredo Cardoso, journalist; shot.
  - Remedios Reyes Zapata, politician (PRI).

=== November ===
- November 2 - Federico Granja Ricalde, 79, politician, Member of the Chamber of Deputies of Mexico.
- November 3
  - Higinio González Calderón, 76, politician (PRI), Secretary of Education of Coahuila; COVID-19.
  - Humberto Suaste Blanco, 67, photographer.
- November 4 - Mario Lavista, 78, composer, writer and intellectual.
- November 5 - Néstor Damián Ángeles Rodríguez, football referee.
- November 6 - Froylán López Narváez, 81, journalist, academic and cultural promoter.
- November 7 - Enrique Rocha, 81, actor (Satánico pandemonium, Yo compro esa mujer, El Privilegio de Amar).
- November 8 - Memo Luna, 91, former baseball player (Cañeros de Los Mochis).
- November 9 - Amalia Aguilar, 97, Cuban-born Mexican actress (Ritmos del Caribe, Al son del mambo, Amor perdido) and dancer.
- November 11
  - Ricardo Escobar Flores, 63, professor and journalist.
  - Ricardo Guerrero González, musician (Liberación).
  - José "Pepe" Vadillo, 49, musician (Los Juglares).
- November 14
  - Norma Cárdenas Zurita, cultural promoter.
  - Clemente Serna Alvear, 84, media proprietor.
- November 15 - Estrella Blanca, 83, professional wrestler (EMLL).
- November 16 - Dizzer Onne, artist.
- November 18
  - José Carral, 99, businessman and banker.
  - Roberto Zavala Ruiz, editor and essayist.
- November 19 - María del Carmen Bolado del Real, 8, politician (PRI).

== See also ==
- 2021 in Mexican politics and government
- Timeline of Mexico history
- Fourth Transformation
- 2021 in the Caribbean
- 2021 in Central America
