= Margarita Pisano =

Chilean architect, writer, theoretician, and feminist

- Born: Margarita Pisano; October 28, 1932; Punta Arenas, Chile
- Died: June 9, 2015 (aged 82); Santiago, Chile
- Occupations: architect, writer, theoretician, and feminist
- Writing career
- Language: Spanish
- Movements: "Movimiento Rebelde del Afuera", "Movimiento Feminista", "Cómplices"

Autógrafo de Margarita Pisano (Biblioteca italiana delle donne di Bologna)

Margarita Pisano Fischer (28 October 1932 – 9 June 2015) was a Chilean architect, writer, theoretician, and feminist belonging to the Movimiento Rebelde del Afuera (Rebel Movement of the Outside).

== Biography ==
Margarita Pisano Fischer was born in Punta Arenas, Chile, on 28 October 1932. She was one of the founders of La Casa de la Mujer La Morada, Radio Tierra and Movimiento Feminista Autónomo. In addition, she was one of the founders of Movimiento Feminista, an opposition group to the Military dictatorship of Augusto Pinochet, whose slogan was "Democracy in the country, in the house and in the bed", a phrase promoted by Margarita and Julieta Kirkwood.

As with Francesca Gargallo, the work of Pisano addressed theoretical proposals associated with the field of gender studies from a feminist perspective that distanced itself from institutional political analysis and activism. This included criticisms of "patriarchal feminism", the problems of autonomy and independence within the feminist movement, and the institutionalization of gender advocated by traditional feminism.

Likewise, Pisano was one of the founders of the feminist group "Cómplices", which emerged in 1993 and was made up of Pisano, Edda Gaviola, Sandra Lidid, Ximena Bedregal, Rosa Rojas, Francesca Gargallo and Amalia Fischer. They called for recognition of the different forms of thought and political practice within the feminist movement. Cómplices debuted in 1993 during the Sixth Latin American and Caribbean Feminist Meeting in El Salvador, presenting itself, as described by Ximena Bedregal, one of the members of the group, as "a political and philosophical proposal in Chile and Mexico (...) in the confluence of different processes, but with the central idea of recognizing that there are different feminisms, explaining the differences, including autonomy, and the construction of a feminist space from autonomy and radicality, as an exercise in the installation of a different speech, the political difference made explicit". Pisano and Bedregal's lesbian feminist writings in 1996–7 were credited with identifying a decline in radical feminism. Pisano died in Santiago, Chile, on 9 June 2015.

== Selected works ==
- Una historia fuera de la historia. Biografía política de Margarita Pisano (2009), en co-autoría Andrea Franulic Depix
- Julia, quiero que seas feliz (2003).
- El triunfo de la masculinidad (2001).
- Feminismos cómplices: gestos para una cultura tendenciosamente diferente (México-Santiago: La Correa Feminista, 1993), en coautoría con Ximena Bedregal, Francesca Gargallo, Amalia Fisher y Edda Gaviola.
- Un cierto desparpajo (Santiago: Eds. Número Crítico, 1996).
- Deseos de cambio, a--el cambio de los deseos? (Santiago: Sandra Lidid., 1995).
- Espiritualidad: una reflexión desde el género (Santiago: La Morada, 1990).
- Feminismo: pasos críticos y deseos de cambio (Santiago: La Morada, 1990).
- Una historia fuera de la historia: biografía política de Margarita Pisano' (Santiago: Editorial Revolucionarias, 2009
- Julia, quiero que seas feliz (Santiago: Editorial Revolucionarias, 2004, 2012).
- Reflexiones feministas (Santiago: Casa de la Mujer La Morada, 1990).
- El signo de las mujeres en nuestra cultura (Santiago: Casa de la Mujer La Morada, 1990).
