= Ximena Bedregal =

Mexican-Bolivian feminist writer and architect

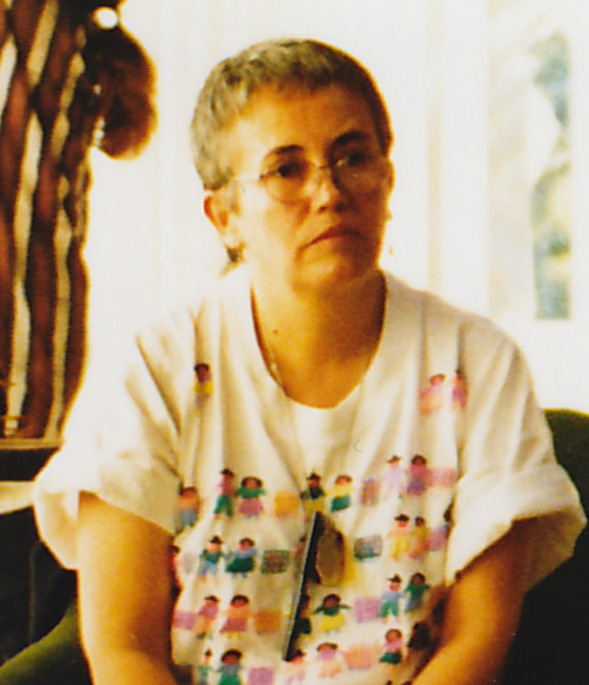
Ximena Sáez

Ximena Bedregal Sáez (born 1951) is a Chilean-Bolivian architect, writer, theoretician, professor, editor, photographer, and feminist lesbian. In Mexico, she founded Centro de Investigación, Capacitación y Apoyo a la Mujer (CICAM; Centre for Research, Training and Support of Women), and edited its magazine, La Correa Feminista.

== Early years and education ==
Bedregal was born in 1951, in the Bolivian Andes. She spent her childhood traveling between Chile and Bolivia, as her mother was Chilean and her father was Bolivian. When she was in Bolivia, she was considered "Chilean", and when she was in Chile, she was nicknamed "bolivianita", "cholita", or "lauquita" for having lived near the Lauca River. From this background, she developed a critical view of the concepts of patriotism and nationalism and later feminist ideas. At the age of eight, Bedregal and her mother moved to Chile. There, she participated in social justice causes and became an exile in Mexico at the age of 27.

Bedregal studied architecture and the arts at the University of Chile in Santiago de Chile and at the Higher University of San Andrés in La Paz, Bolivia. At the Higher University of San Andrés, she also studied film. Her master's work in urban planning took place at the National Autonomous University of Mexico. At the Centro de la Imagen in Mexico City, she participated in numerous photography workshops under Ana Casas, Joan Foncuberta, Graciela Iturbide, Hanna Iverson and Pedro Meyer.

== Career ==
From 1983 through 1985, Bedregal served as Professor of Art History and Architecture at the University of Puebla, Mexico. She formed a feminist center in Mexico, and from 1995 to 2000 was the director and publisher of its magazine, La Correa feminista, which articulated feminist criticism and reflection in 20 quarterly issues. From 1989 to 2001, she served as Director of CICAM in Mexico City. From 1997 to 2008, she was the editor and director of the Internet website, "Creatividad Feminista", described as a multimedia feminist reflection space. The site had 60,000 visitors per month, serving as the face of radical and critical cyber feminism in Latin America. With this feminist website journal, she "dedicated herself to expanding the perspectives available in cyberspace". When she forgot to renew the domain name, it was bought by someone else, and Bedregal moved on, From 1998-2006, she served as the editor of "Triple Jornada", the women's supplement to La Jornada (Mexico City); she also was in charge of its online version. In 2006, Bedregal returned to Bolivia as a freelance correspondent for La Jornada of Mexico and other international publications.

In her work as a theoretician and writer, Bedregal has does research in the field of gender studies from a feminist activist perspective, criticising the moderate political discourse on feminism, including lesbophobia. Her publications have addressed the role of women within indigenous movements, as in the case of the Zapatista. She has questioned the weakness of Mexican legislation for women's rights and the efficiency of some international programs such as microcredit through the International Monetary Fund. She has written for several other journals, including Debate feminista.

As a visual artist and photographer, Bedregal has participated in several solo and group exhibitions, among which are Como mujer no tengo Patria, el mundo entero es mi tierra – La tira de la Peregrinació at the National Art Museum in La Paz, Bolivia (2009), Bolivia, luces y sombras de un proceso at the Centro Cultural de Defensa y Promoción de los Derechos Humanos de Morelos (2009) and Bolivia Resistencia y Esperanza: una muestra documental del proceso boliviano at the Casa de la Cultura de Tlayacapan (2009).

== Selected works ==
- Hilos nudos y colores en la violencia hacia las mujeres (CICAM, 1991) (with Irma Saucedo and Florinda Riquer) (in Spanish)
- Permanecia Voluntaria en la Utopía (CICAM, 1997) (in Spanish)
- Feminismos cómplices: gestos para una cultura tendenciosamente diferente (La Correa Feminista, 1993) (with Margarita Pisano, Francesca Gargallo, Amalia Fisher, and Edda Gaviola) (in Spanish)

Editor

- Ética y Feminismo (CICAM, 1995) (in Spanish)

Collaboration

- Chiapas, y las mujeres qué? (La Correa Feminista, 1994) (in Spanish)

== Bibliography ==
- Corrales, Javier; Pecheny, Mario (2010). The Politics of Sexuality in Latin America. University of Pittsburgh Pre. ISBN 978-0-8229-7371-3. She has written extensively in Mexico.
