= Mexico City Metro PCCI fire =

Fire in Mexico City, Mexico

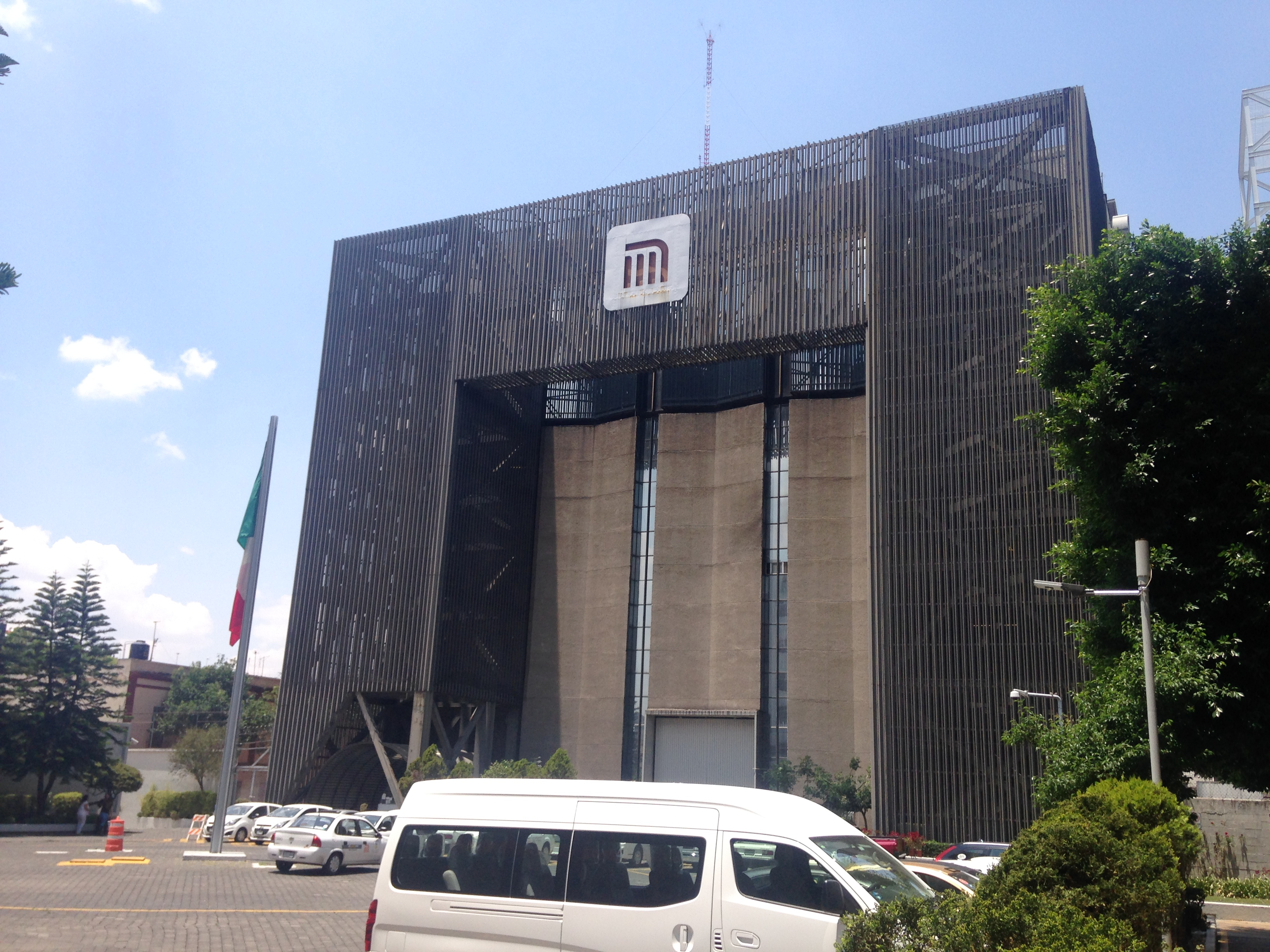
- Offices of the Mexico City Metro on Delicias Street in Mexico City, scene of fire.
- Date: 05:48:00 (UTC -6) 9 January 2021
- Location: Offices of the Collective Transportation System, Calle de Delicias, Mexico City
- Deaths: 1
- Injuries: 31

A fire at the PCCI (Spanish: Puesto Central de Control I — Central Control Center I) of the Mexico City Metro took place on 9 January 2021 at 05:48 hours at the PCCI building. A female police officer was killed and 31 others were injured, mainly due to smoke poisoning.

== Events ==
The incident occurred at 05:48 am (local time) on 9 January 2021, when two power electrical substations caused a short circuit within the Central Control Center I (or No. 1), immediately starting a fire of considerable proportions; the fire alarm at the site was immediately activated and several workers on the center attempted to escape.

On the other hand, the Mexico City Metro, which at that time was preparing to start service that day, was unable to do so on lines 1, 2, 3, 4, 5 and 6; it was reported that the service would be suspended temporarily while the fire in the plant was controlled and the damage was evaluated. Passengers who required the service at that time found it difficult to move, so the Mexico City Police helped with transportation in patrol cars, while an official statement was expected.

The Head of Government of Mexico City, Claudia Sheinbaum, reported through Twitter that the fire was controlled at 8:45 a.m.

== See also ==
- 2021 in Mexico
