= Alfredo Jalife =

Mexican physician, writer and political analyst

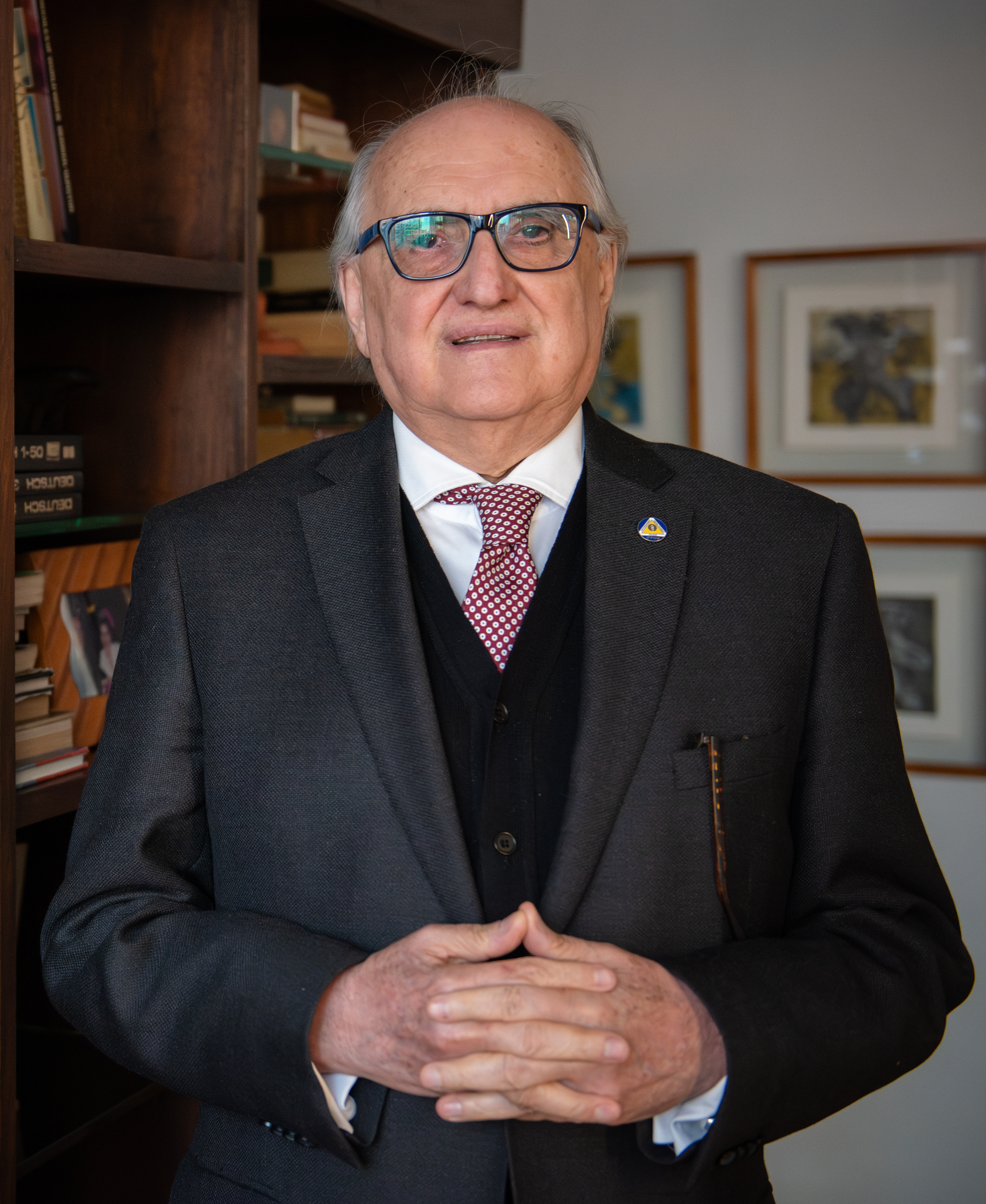
Jalife in 2018

Alfredo Jalife-Rahme Barrios (born 24 May 1948) is a Mexican physician, university professor, writer, and political analyst. He collaborates regularly with analyses for Contralínea, La Jornada, and CNN en Español, among others.

== Early life and education ==
Alfredo Jalife-Rahme Barrios was born on 24 May 1948, in Mérida, Yucatán. He is of Lebanese descent.

He earned his medical degree as a surgeon and psychiatrist from the National Autonomous University of Mexico (UNAM). He also holds a specialty in neuroendocrinology from the Mexican National Institute of Nutrition.

He performed his community social service in the Sierra Ardiente region of Guerrero, Mexico.

== Career ==
Jalife taught psychology at the University of the Americas (UDLAP) from 1978 to 1990 and earned a master's degree in business administration from UDLAP. He also served as a professor at the Faculty of Accounting and Administration at UNAM and taught a graduate-level course on Globalization and Geopolitics at UNAM.

In 1996, Jalife was part of the Mexican delegation to the 12th World Congress of the International Physicians for the Prevention of Nuclear War (IPPNW), although the organization does not recognizes him as part of its members.

Jalife regularly contributes to newspapers such as La Jornada, El Financiero, and El Independiente de Hidalgo. He contributed to CNN en Español, and magazine Líderes Mexicanos named him Mexico's top international affairs analyst in 2003.

He is a founding member of the National Regeneration Movement, a political association that later became a political party.

== Public statements ==
Jalife-Rahme holds a nationalist stance and is critical of globalization, which he believes has benefited developed countries at the expense of underdeveloped ones.

In April 2019, a group of 142 Mexican intellectuals, including Enrique Krauze, Juan Villoro, Javier Sicilia, and Héctor Aguilar Camín, sent a letter to President Andrés Manuel López Obrador requesting that Jalife-Rahme not be appointed to any government position. The letter argued that Jalife-Rahme "is the extreme representative of hate speech on Mexican social media" and that he has engaged in religious, racial, and homophobic discrimination. In response, López Obrador stated, "There is no veto for Jalife nor for anyone."

== Detention ==
On 6 December 2023, Alfredo Jalife was detained in Nuevo León on an order from judicial authorities. The order was issued following a complaint for alleged defamation filed by former Secretary of Economy Tatiana Clouthier. He was released the next day.

== Published works ==
- Guerras geoeconómicas y financieras: el petróleo del Golfo de México al Golfo Pérsico, INIZA (1997), ISBN 968-7615-02-1
- El lado oscuro de la globalización: post-globalización y balcanización, CADMO & EUROPA (2000), ISBN 9-789709-256406
- Los 11 frentes antes y después del 11 de septiembre: una guerra multidimensional, CADMO & EUROPA (2003), ISBN 9-789709-256413
- Irak: Bush bajo la lupa, H. Garetto (2005), ISBN 978-9872204907
- El fin de una era: turbulencias en la globalización, Libros del Zorzal, (2007), ISBN 978-9875990333
- Hacia la desglobalizacion / Towards des-globalization, Jorale/Orfila, (2007), ISBN 978-9685863223
- El híbrido mundo multipolar: un enfoque multidimensional, Orfila, (2010), ISBN 978-6077521068
- La desnacionalización de Pemex, Orfila, (2009), ISBN 978-6077521006
- Las revoluciones árabes en curso: el detonador alimentario global, Orfila (2011), ISBN 978-6077521112
- China irrumpe en Latinoamérica: ¿dragón o panda?, Orfila (2012), ISBN 978-6077521181
- Muerte de Pemex y suicidio de México, Orfila (2014), ISBN 978-6077521242
- Argentina, los fondos "buitres" y las Malvinas: un enfoque geoestratégico, Orfila (2014), ISBN 978-6077521273
- Las guerras globales del agua: privatización y fracking, Orfila (2015), ISBN 978-6077521341
- Geopolítica del yihadismo global, Orfila (2016), ISBN 978-6077521402
- Trump y el supremacismo blanco: palestinización de los mexicanos, Orfila (2017), ISBN 978-6077521471
- El (des)orden global en la era post-Estados Unidos, Orfila (2018), ISBN 978-6077521570
- Nacionalismo contra globalismo: dicotomía del siglo XXI antes de la inteligencia artificial, Orfila (2019), ISBN 978-6077521662
- La invisible cárcel cibernética. Google Apple Facebook Amazon Twitter, Orfila (2019), ISBN 978-6077521655
- Guerra multidimensional entre Estados Unidos y China, Orfila (2020), ISBN 978-6077521839
- El espejo negro de Estados Unidos. La migración latinoamericana, Orfila (2021), ISBN 978-6077521921
- Ucrania primera guerra híbrida mundial: fractura de la biosfera, Orfila (2022), ISBN 978-6078879014
- Nuevo orden geofinanciero multipolar: desdolarización y Divisa BRICS, Orfila (2023), ISBN 978-6077521839
- Gaza. Geopolítica de la barbarie de Israel, Orfila (2024), ISBN 978-6078879212
- Trilema Global: nuevo orden tetrapolar, fractura bipolar biosférica, guerra nuclear, Orfila (2025), ISBN 978-6078879250
