= Cruz López Aguilar =

Mexican politician (1947–2021)

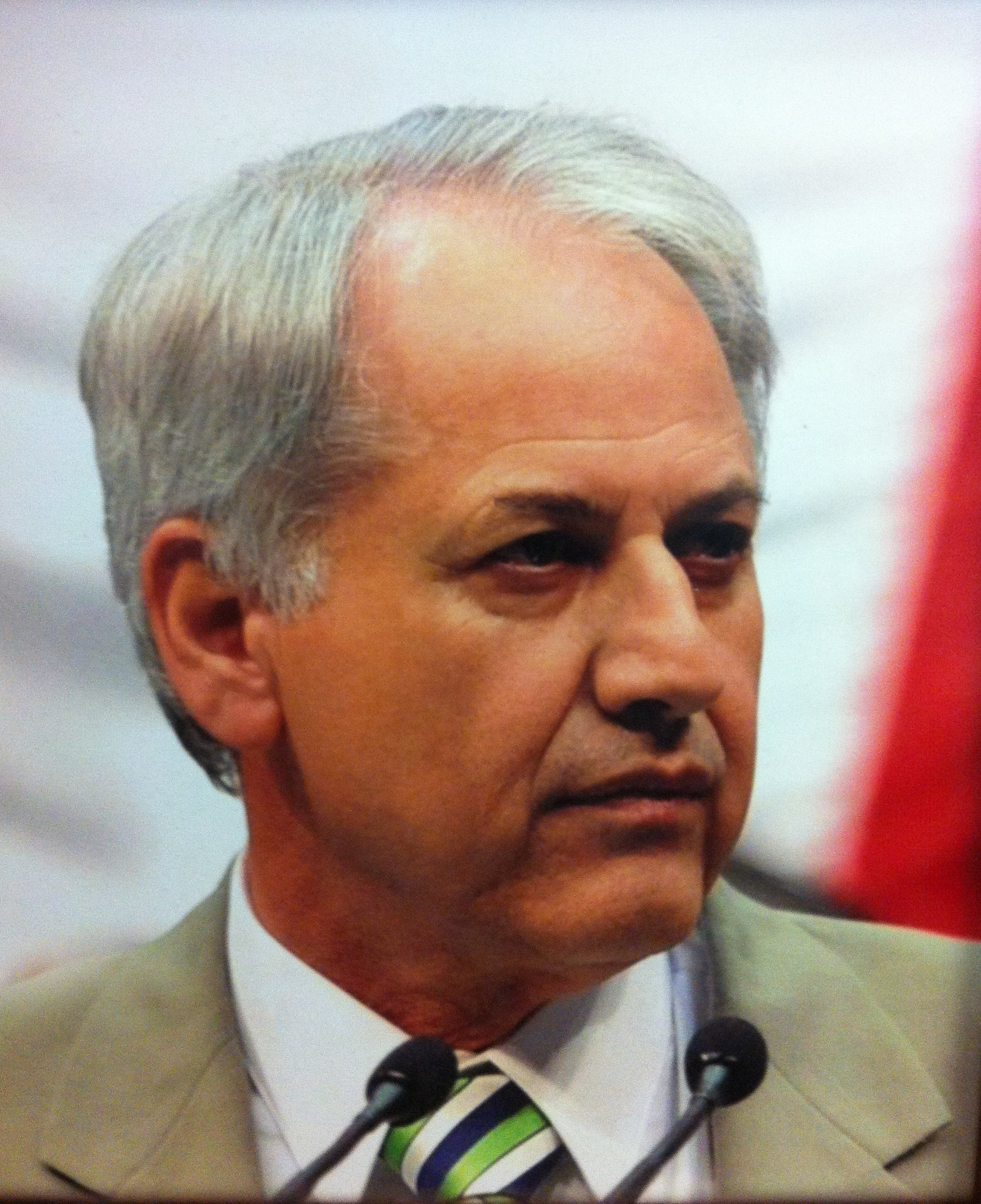
- Born: 3 May 1947 (age 79); General Bravo, Nuevo León, Mexico
- Education: Chapingo Autonomous University
- Occupation: Politician
- Political party: PRI

Cruz López Aguilar (May 3, 1947 - August 28, 2021) is a Mexican politician affiliated with the Institutional Revolutionary Party. As of 2014 he served as Deputy of the LIX and LXI Legislatures of the Mexican Congress as a plurinominal representative.
