= Ricardo Silva Elizondo =

Mexican singer (1954–2021)

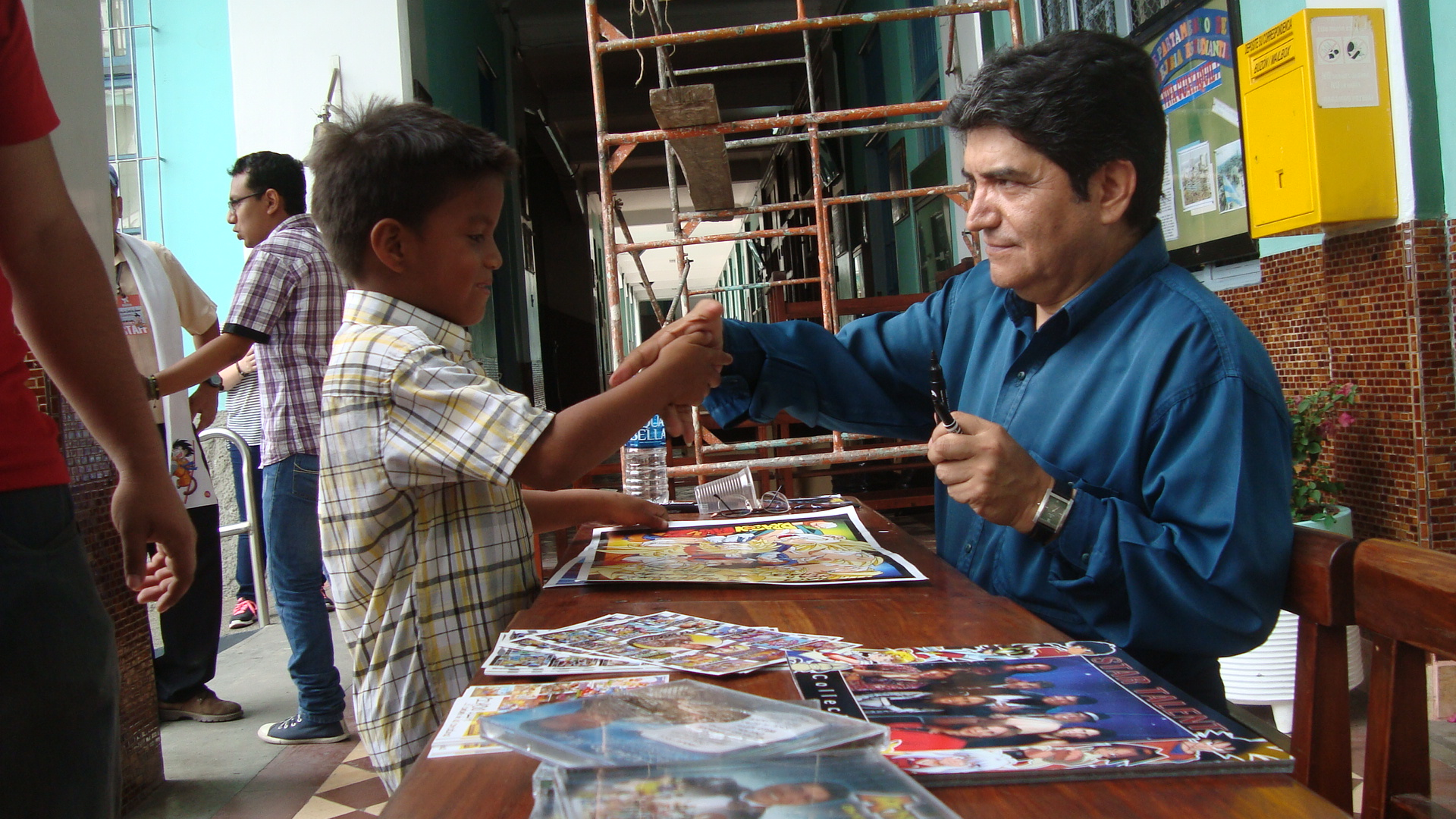
Ricardo Silva in 2014

Ricardo Silva Elizondo (6 February 1954 – 7 February 2021) was a Mexican singer and actor best known for his dubbing of American animated cartoons and Japanese anime into the Spanish language. His works include the Spanish Latin American version of the Dragon Ball Z theme, "Cha-La Head-Cha-La", and the second opening of Digimon. Besides anime, his tenor voice is known for singing the Ducktales and Chip 'n Dale: Rescue Rangers theme songs.

He died from COVID-19 in Mexico City during the COVID-19 pandemic in Mexico, one day after his 67th birthday.
