= Miguel Arellano =

Mexican basketball player (1941–2021)

Miguel Arellano (2 March 1941 – 10 May 2021) was a Mexican basketball player who competed in the 1964 Summer Olympics and in the 1968 Summer Olympics. He was born in Zacatecas City.
