= Rafael Heredia =

Mexican basketball player (1937–2021)

Rafael Heredia Estrella (19 February 1937 – 28 January 2021) was a Mexican basketball player who competed in the 1964 Summer Olympics and in the 1968 Summer Olympics.
