= Diego Rosas Anaya =

Mexican politician (c.1990–2021)

Diego Rosas Anaya (c. 1990 – August 2, 2021) was a Mexican politician and member of the National Action Party (PAN). Rosa was elected to the Congress of the State of Mexico, representing the 17th district based in Huixquilucan, on June 6, 2021, but died on August 2, 2021, before taking office.

Member-elect Diego Rosas Anaya died of a heart attack on August 2, 2021, at the age of 31. He had been scheduled to take office in the Congress of the State of Mexico on September 5, 2021. His running mate, Luis Narcizo Fierro Cima, will assume his seat in the state congress following his death.
