= Avelino Méndez Rangel =

Mexican politician (1958–2021)

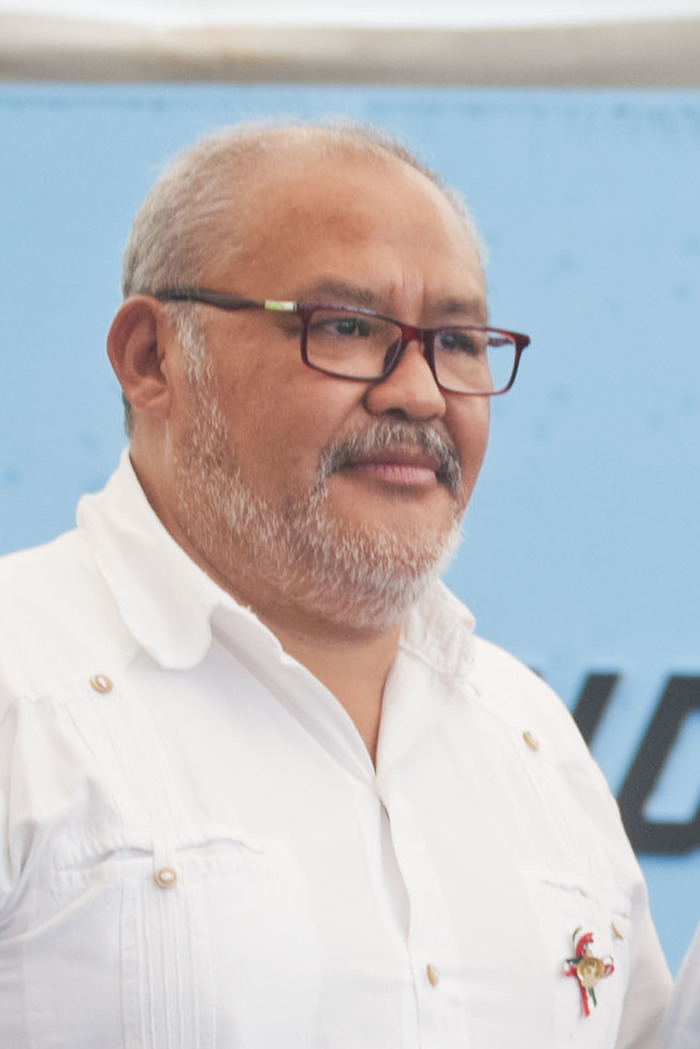
- Avelino Méndez Rangel
- Born: 26 November 1958; Mexico City, Mexico
- Died: 25 January 2021 (aged 62)
- Occupation: Politician
- Political party: PMT (1985–1987); PMS (1987–1989); PRD (1989–2015); Morena (2015–2021)

Avelino Méndez Rangel (26 November 1958 – 25 January 2021) was a Mexican politician from the Party of the Democratic Revolution.

== Biography ==
From 2009 to 2012, he served as a federal deputy in the LXI Legislature, representing the Federal District. He also served as borough mayor in Xochimilco and as undersecretary of government for Mexico City.

Rangel died in Mexico City on 25 January 2021, after being hospitalized with COVID-19 some days earlier, during the COVID-19 pandemic in Mexico.
