= Chepina Peralta =

Mexican chef (1930–2021)

Lucia Josefina Sanchez Quintanar known as Chepina Peralta (20 October 1930 – 2 April 2021) was a Mexican chef and TV personality. She was a pioneer in cooking on television in various programs like La Cocina de Chepina, Cocinando con Chepina, Chepina en tu cocina, Su menú diario, Sal y Pimienta, and Chepina y su menú pando.
