= Antonio Helguera =

Mexican cartoonist (1965–2021)

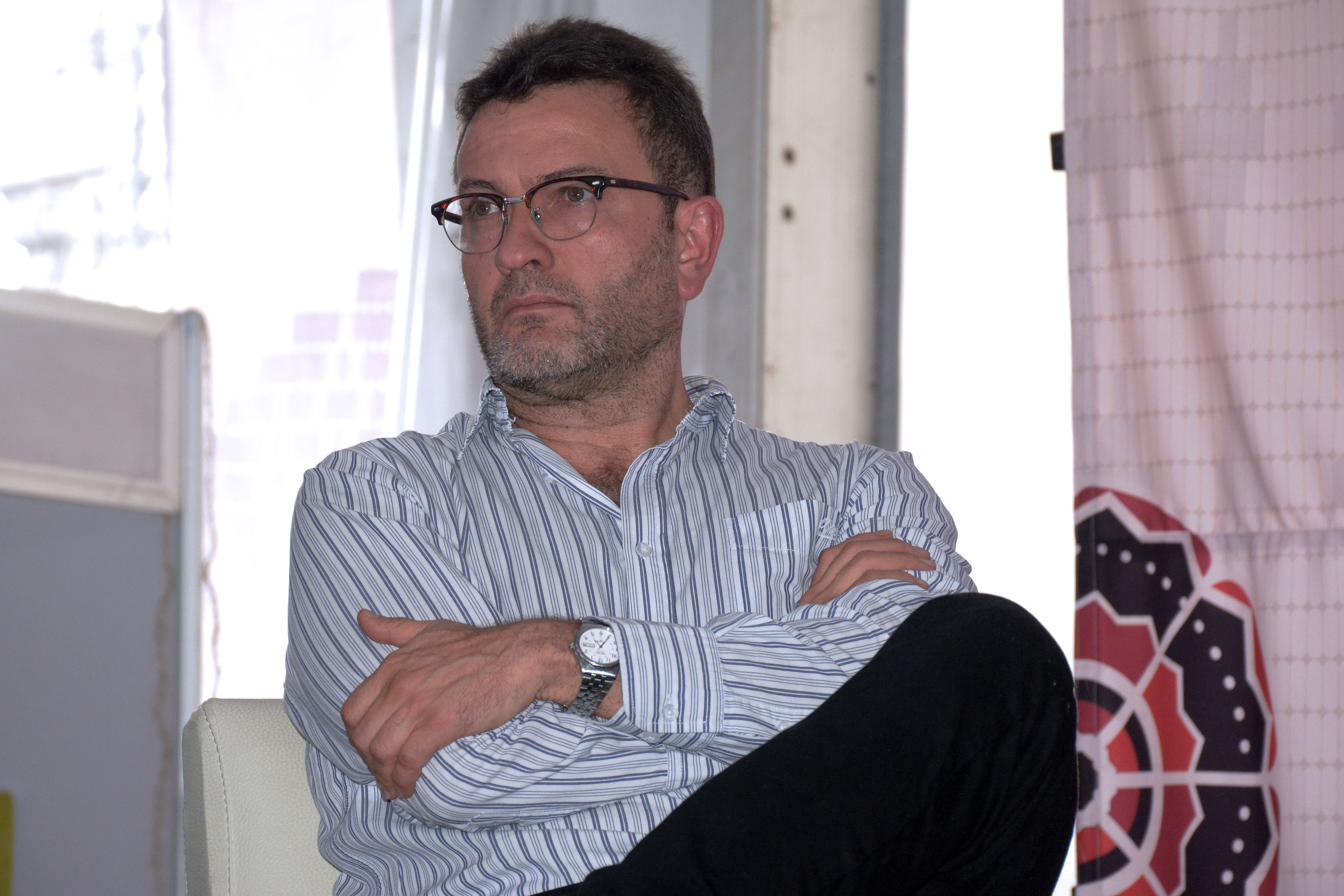
- Born: 8 November 1965; Mexico City, Mexico
- Died: 25 June 2021 (aged 55)
- Occupation: Cartoonist

Antonio Helguera (8 November 1965 – 25 June 2021) was a Mexican cartoonist. He studied engraving at La Esmeralda National School of Painting, Sculpture and Engraving. In 1983, he began his career as a political cartoonist in the newspaper El Día. He continued this work at La Jornada (where his cartoons appeared regularly) and Siempre!, in addition to El Chahuistle and El Chamuco, magazines of which he was also the co-editor. In 1996 and 2002 he received the Premio Nacional de Periodismo (National Journalism Award).

== Political cartoons ==
His work mainly consisted of cartoons about both Mexican and international politics. He is thought to have used cartoons as a form of free speech, since it allows for important issues to be disseminated to the public regardless of their socio-economic backgrounds.
