= La Jornada =

Mexican daily newspaper

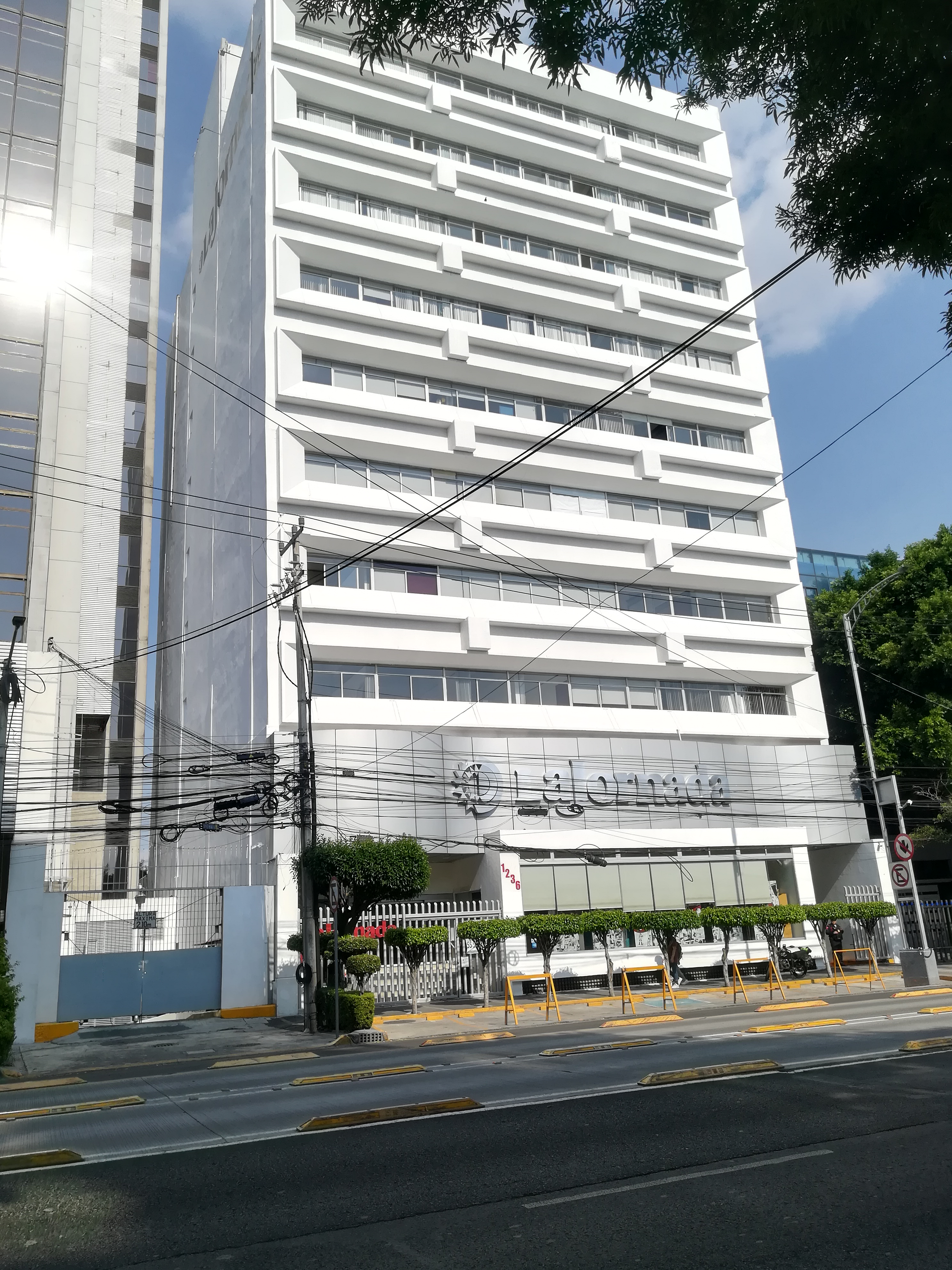
- Headquarters
- Type: Daily newspaper
- Format: Compact
- Publisher: Desarrollo de Medios S.A. de C.V.
- Editor: Carmen Lira Saade
- Founded: 1984; 42 years ago
- Political alignment: Left-wing
- Language: Spanish
- Headquarters: Mexico City, Mexico
- Circulation: 287,000 (readership, 2006)
- Website: www.jornada.com.mx

La Jornada (The Working Day) is one of Mexico City's leading daily newspapers. It was established in 1984 by Carlos Payán Velver. The current editor (directora general) is Carmen Lira Saade. As of 2006 it had approximately 287,000 readers in Mexico City, and, according to them, their website has approximately 180,000 daily page views.

The online version was launched in 1995, with no restrictions on access and a Google-based search that includes the historic archives of the newspaper. The website is hosted by the National Autonomous University of Mexico (UNAM).

== Regional Editions ==
La Jornada has the following regional editions:

- La Jornada Aguascalientes
- La Jornada Baja California
- La Jornada Estado de México
- La Jornada Hidalgo
- La Jornada Maya
- La Jornada Morelos
- La Jornada de Oriente
- La Jornada San Luis
- La Jornada Veracruz
- La Jornada Zacatecas

Previously, La Jornada had editions in Guerrero, Jalisco, and Michoacán.

== Contributors ==
Many of the newspaper's editorialists have academic affiliations with the UNAM or the Colegio de México.

- Julio Hernández López
- Jose Steinsleger
- Ximena Bedregal (editor of Triple Jornada)
- Eduardo Galeano (former contributor)
- Miguel Angel Rivera
- Carlos Fernández-Vega
- Alfredo Jalife
- Julio Boltvinik
- Marlene Santos
- Patricia Peñaloza
- Mario Di Costanzo
- Gustavo Iruegas
- Iván Restrepo
- Antonio Helguera
- Arnoldo Kraus
- Enrique Galvan Ochoa
- Carlos Fazio
- Gustavo Esteva
- León Bendesky
- Elena Poniatowska
- Hermann Bellinghausen
- José Cueli
- Leonardo Garcia Tsao
- Mario Benedetti
- Carlos Monsiváis
- Joan Martinez Alier
- John Saxe Fernandez
- Abraham Nuncio Limón
- Verónica Murguía editor of the bi-weekly column "Las rayas de la cebra" since 2000

It occasionally translates and includes op-eds from Robert Fisk, Noam Chomsky, James Petras, Howard Zinn, Greg Palast and others. Fidel Castro also repeatedly contributed to the newspaper as an author.

== Reception ==
Noam Chomsky described La Jornada as "maybe the only real independent newspaper in the hemisphere".

== See also ==
- Carmen Aristegui
- List of newspapers in Mexico
