= Martha Madrigal =

Mexican poet (1929–2021)

- Born: Martha Madrigal Castillejos; 1929; Tuxtla Gutiérrez, Chiapas, Mexico
- Died: January 22, 2021 (aged 91)
- Occupations: Poet and storyteller
- Writing career
- Genre: Haiku
- Notable works: Haikais; Cónclave de signos. Antología poética; Me gusta escribir poesía

Martha Madrigal Castillejos (1929 – 22 January 2021) was a Mexican poet and storyteller. Among her works are Haikais (2000), Cónclave de signos, Antología poética (2020), and Me gusta escribir poesía. In 2014 she cooperated with flautist Horacio Franco to record Enamorada travesía, a dialog about love that combined the spoken language and the flute.

On 19 September 2019, Madrigal and Franco gave a concert accompanied by the "Antiqva Metropoli orquestra", directed by Juan Luis Mátuz in honor of the rescue workers from the 2017 Puebla earthquake in which 370 people died and 6,000 were injured.

Martha Madrigal Castillejos died from COVID-19 at the age of 91 during the COVID-19 pandemic in Mexico.
