= Miguel Arsenio Lara Sosa =

Mexican politician and businessman (1953–2021)

Member of the Congress of Yucatán from Tecoh
- In office 1 July 1998 – 30 June 2001
- Succeeded by: José María Fernández Medina

Municipal president of Tixkokob
- In office 1998–2004

Personal details
- Born: 1953
- Died: 22 February 2021 (aged 67–68)
- Party: PRI

Miguel Arsenio Lara Sosa (1953 – 22 February 2021) was a Mexican politician and businessman.

== Biography ==
He was the son of Pedro Arsenio Lara Puerto, an agrarian leader and social activist. Miguel graduated from Chapingo Autonomous University in 1978 with a degree in zootechnical engineering and became a professional in the agricultural sector, becoming President of the Sociedad Apícola Maya in 1996. A member of the Institutional Revolutionary Party, he served in the Congress of Yucatán from 1998 to 2001, as well as Municipal president of the village of Tixkokob from 1998 to 2004.

Miguel Arsenio Lara Sosa died of cardiac arrest on 22 February 2021 at the age of 68.
