= Servando Cano Rodríguez =

Mexican singer-songwriter (1942–2021)

- Born: 13 September 1942; China, Mexico
- Died: 8 February 2021 (aged 78); Monterrey, Mexico
- Occupation: Singer-songwriter

Servando Cano Rodríguez (13 September 1942 – 8 February 2021) was a Mexican singer-songwriter, producer, and impresario. He helped launch the careers of Cornelio Reyna and Ramón Ayala, as well as the groups Los Tigres del Norte, La Mafia, Intocable, and Grupo Pesado.

== Biography ==
In 1988, Rodríguez was aided to organize concerts and tours by Oscar Flores, creator of artistic agency Representaciones Artisticas Apodaca. The pair then worked together to help organize concerts for Bronco and Vargas de Tecalitlán. On 11 April 1992, Rodríguez organized an event in Naucalpan for Bronco, Sonora Santanera, Los Yonic's, and Los Barón de Apodaca. In 1996, Rodríguez severed his ties with Flores.

Servando Cano Rodríguez died in Monterrey on 8 February 2021 at the age of 78.
