= Puebla sinkhole =

Sinkhole in Puebla, Mexico

Coordinates: 19.125884°N 98.373820°W

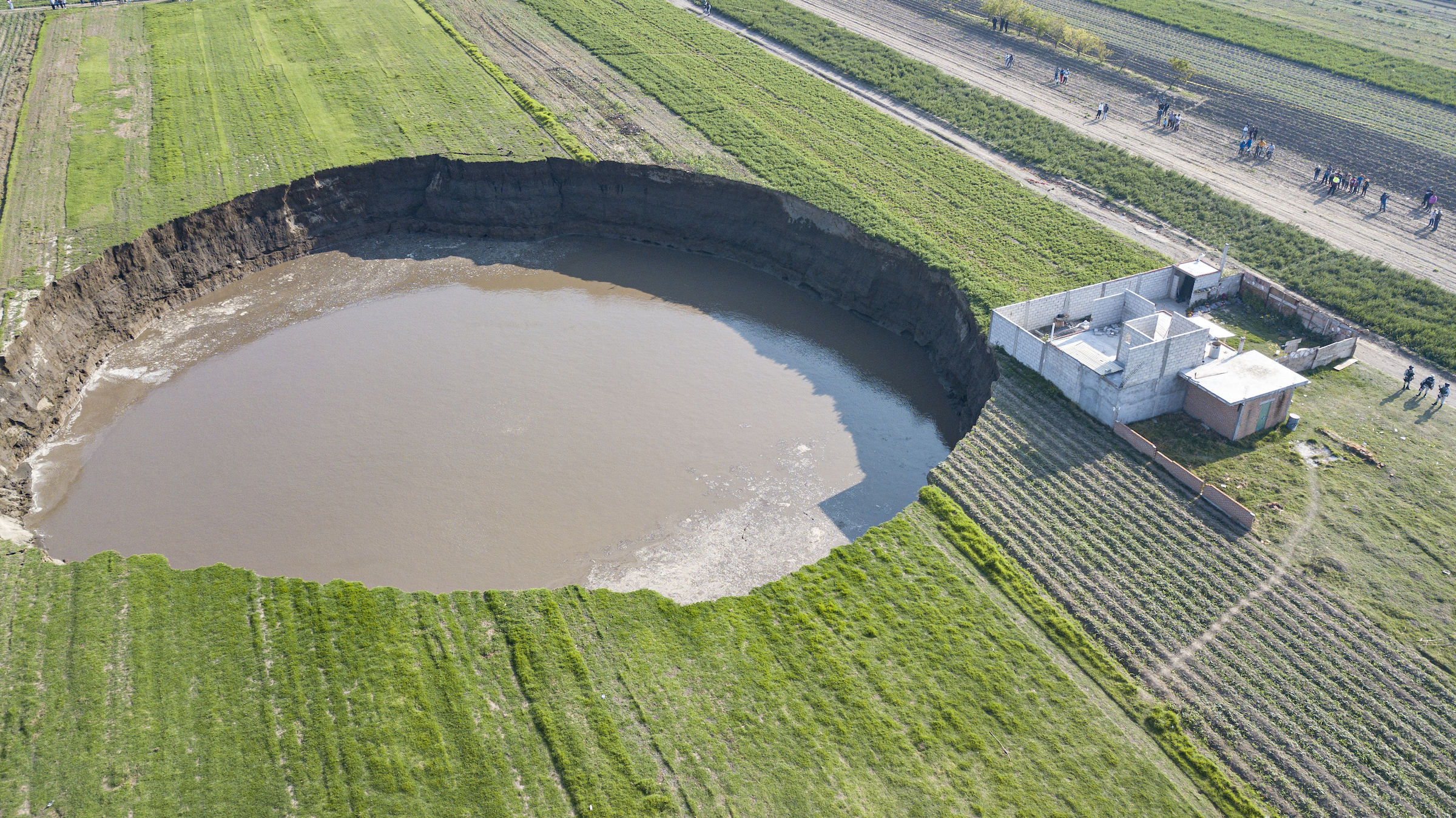
The Puebla sinkhole

The Puebla sinkhole is located in the town of Santa Maria Zacatepec, Juan C. Bonilla municipality, Puebla, Mexico. It is found 93.7 kilometres (58.2 mi) west of the state capital of Puebla, and 212 kilometres (132 mi) east of Mexico City, at coordinates 19.1257, -98.3738. The sinkhole first appeared on May 29, 2021, with a diameter of 15 feet (4.6 m); by June 10 it had grown to 400 feet (120 m) with a depth estimated at 50 feet (15 m).

== First appearance and developments ==
The sinkhole opened in a field on the afternoon of May 29, 2021, with a diameter of 15 feet (4.6 m). Homeowners Magdalena and Heriberto Sánchez reported hearing a loud sound before finding the pit. The couple, who live with their two children, ages 13 and 11, have been forced to flee their modest home, which they had remodelled from 2014 to May 2020 with an investment of MXN $700,000 (US$35,000 at June 2021 exchange rate). Local people believe the sinkhole may be related to what was once a jagüey or artificial pond, in the area, but environmental officials have suggested it may be related to a softening of the soil as a result of overexploitation of the aquifers in the Alto Atoyac sub-basin of the Balsas River basin in southwest Mexico. The sinkhole is filled with water that has strong currents; some people believe the water may come from an underground river. The water almost completely disappears at about 3 or 4 a.m. On June 14, the Sánchez Xalamiahua family residence completely caved into the pit. Puebla Governor Miguel Barbosa announced that the local municipality council will donate a parcel of land to the family and the state government will build them a new home. Two dogs that fell into the pit in the afternoon of June 10 were rescued a few hours later, by which time the sinkhole had grown to 400 feet (120 m) with a depth estimated at 50 feet (15 m).

The government has warned that tourists should stay away from the area and has prohibited the flying of drones over the area.

== See also ==
- Cenote
- Cave of Swallows
- Zacatón
