= Francisco Monterrosa =

Mexican artist (1968–2021)

Francisco López Monterrosa (10 October 1968 – 31 August 2021) was a Mexican Zapotec visual artist, muralist, and engraver. He died due to complications of COVID-19.
