= Isabel Martínez (actress) =

Mexican actress (1946–2021)

- Born: 4 November 1946
- Died: 7 August 2021 (aged 74)
- Other name: La Tarabilla
- Occupations: Actress, comedian

Isabel Martínez, nickname La Tarabilla (4 November 1946 – 7 August 2021) was a Mexican actress and comedian. She was the sister of actress and broadcaster Patricia Martínez.
