= Zelá Brambillé =

Mexican writer (1994–2021)

- Born: Andrea Alejandra Álvarez González; 8 June 1994; Monterrey, Mexico
- Died: 4 August 2021 (aged 27); Saltillo, Mexico
- Education: Autonomous University of Coahuila
- Occupations: writer and novelist
- Writing career
- Years active: 2013–2021
- Genres: Romance, Drama and Youth literature
- Notable awards: The Wattys 2015; The Wattys 2016; II Premio Oz de Novela
- Website: wattpad.com/user/ZelaBrambille

Andrea Alejandra Álvarez González (8 June 1994 – 4 August 2021) better known as Zelá Brambillé, was a Mexican writer and novelist, who became well known through the Wattpad network. One of her works, Miradas Azucaradas, has exceeded 20 million readings in Wattpad.

She died of COVID-19 pneumonia at the age of 27 during the COVID-19 pandemic in Mexico.

== Career ==
From a very young age she was always interested in the world of literature and in creating her own stories. She started uploading her books to the Internet in 2013, which today have more than 70 million readings. In 2017, Nova Casa Editorial published her books "Luz de luciérnaga" and "Somos electricidad", and later "Miradas azucaradas". In 2018, her work "Tiempo de ceniza" was the finalist in the "II Premio Oz de Novela". This contest is held by Oz Editorial.

== Works ==
- 2017: Luz de luciérnaga
- 2017: Somos electricidad
- 2018: Miradas azucaradas
- 2018: Tiempo de ceniza
- 2019: Gardenia
