= Luz María Puente =

Mexican pianist (1923–2021)

- Born: 20 November 1923; Los Angeles, United States
- Died: 23 February 2021 (aged 97)
- Occupation: pianist

Luz María Puente (20 November 1923 – 23 February 2021) was an American born Mexican pianist.

Her son Jorge Federico Osorio is also a pianist. Puente died on 23 February 2021, aged 97.

In 2008 the Mexico City Chamber Orchestra paid tribute to her during a concert for her career as a soloist and teacher of several generations of pianists. On 26 January 2015, the National Council for Culture and the Arts and the Academia Medalla Mozart A.C. awarded Puente the Medal in the Merit Category, along with Gallya Dubrova, Natia Stankivitch and Virgilio Valle. In September 2017 she received the Bellas Artes medal.
