= Alberto Ciurana =

Mexican television executive (1960–2021)

- Born: 26 October 1960; Guadalajara, Jal, Mexico
- Died: 23 March 2021 (aged 60); Mexico City
- Employer: TV Azteca
- Known for: President and CEO of DT Consulting; Former President of Programming and Content for Univision; former vice president of programming at Televisa

Alberto Ciurana (26 October 1960 – 23 March 2021) was a Mexican television executive who worked as Chief Content & Distribution officer of TV Azteca. Previously, Ciurana served as President of Programming and Content for Univision Networks, where he oversaw programming for the entertainment broadcast and cable networks of Univision Communications Inc. Ciurana moved to Univision after working as VP of programming for Televisa for 15 years and was part of a steady expansion of Televisa influence at Univision that builds on the partnership struck among them in October 2010.

Alberto Ciurana served as the President of Programming and Content at Univision from November 2012 until February 2016. Before working with Univision he was Vice President of Programming at Televisa, of Broadcasting, and of Operations. Alberto Ciurana was a part of a team that was responsible for the launch of Teleton Mexico. Before any of these roles, he was helping expand the Televisa brand around the world, while in London with the responsibility for Eurovisa. Prior to the beginning of his television career, he was working as a Director of Social Communications for Guanajuato, Mexico. Since 2013, Alberto Ciurana has been a Director of the National Association of Television Program Executives. He has also won recognition and numerous awards for his leadership in Spanish-language media in his more than three decades at Televisa.

== Early life ==
Before beginning his career as a television executive, Ciurana served as Director of Social Communications for the state of Guanajuato, Mexico.

At 18 years old, Ciurana began his career when he started to work on a program, Siempre en Domingo, with Raul Velasco. He then left the program at 24 years old and moved to the United States of America. When he moved to the United States he was in charge of the vice presidency of what is now known as Univision.

== Career ==
=== Televisa ===
Before joining Univision Ciurana worked for Televisa as vice president of Broadcasting and vice president of International Operations and was later appointed as VP of programming, leading their networks to record ratings. During this time, Ciurana was also part of the team responsible for launching Teletón México, an annual telethon dedicated to helping children with disabilities, cancer and autism that has built more than 20 children's rehabilitation centers in 18 states in Mexico. Prior to these roles, he oversaw international operations at Televisa, in charge of Eurovisa and expanding the Televisa brand and reach around the world, based out of London.

=== Univision ===
In September 2012, Ciurana was appointed head of Programming for Univision Networks, shortly after Ciurana took over, Univision saw significant ratings milestones. In the February sweeps, the network came in fourth place for the first time with adult demographics while NBC came in fifth. In the July sweeps, Univision came in as the No. 1 network among both Adults 18-49 and 18-34 for the first time, setting an unprecedented milestone – during a time when other networks "invested more than ever in summer programming" according to CEO Randy Falco.

In 1986, Ciurana served as vice president of production at the Spanish International Network which became Univision in 1987.

Univision had made claims of Donald Trump, president of the United States, to be "thinned-skin" after Trump's comments about Mexican immigrants. Trump had made false claims about Mexican immigrants stating "They're bringing drugs. They're bringing crime. They're rapists. And some, I assume, are good people". Trump had tainted the image of Mexican immigrants with his words to further gain support for his run for election from Republicans. On 25 June 2015, Ciurana tweeted out "Por los comentarios de Donald Trump de los inmigrantes mexicanos terminamos relación con Miss Universe Org." As a result, Univision had terminated a five-year, $13.5 million deal to broadcast the Miss USA Pageant. Univision believes that after such words he had "destroyed the value of those broadcast rights, and neither Trump nor Miss Universe did anything to repair the damage in the aftermath of his speech." Ciurana expressed his feelings on the topic by making an Instagram post where he put a side-to-side of Trump and the Charleston, South Carolina, shooter Dylann Roof. The post was later taken down but had stirred up a lot of suspicion of Univision conspiring with NBC to deteriorate Trump's "personal and business relationship with the Hispanic community".

=== TV Azteca ===
In October 2017, Alberto Ciurana became a new member of TV Azteca. He has become the new head of television and content distribution of TV Azteca. According to the firm led by Benjamin Salinas Sada, "Ciurana will bring international experience, vocation, and leadership to turn the company into a more agile organization that responds to the new challenges of the sector and consolidates the successes achieved in recent years." Alberto Ciurana will be the one who will be in charge of programming, operating, and producing the television channels for TV Azteca.

== Death ==
Alberto Ciurana died from COVID-19 on 23 March 2021, during the COVID-19 pandemic in Mexico.

== Organizations ==
In 2013, Ciurana was appointed a board member of NATPE. He served on the board of Fundación Teletón USA.
