= Elia Hernández Núñez =

Mexican politician (1962–2021)

- Born: 20 June 1962; Guanajuato, Mexico
- Died: 24 August 2021 (aged 59)
- Occupation: Politician
- Political party: PAN

Elia Hernández Núñez (20 June 1962 – 24 August 2021) was a Mexican politician from the National Action Party. From 2006 to 2009 she served as Deputy of the LX Legislature of the Mexican Congress representing Guanajuato.
