= Juan Manuel De la Rosa =

Mexican artist (1945–2021)

Juan Manuel De la Rosa (1945–2021) was a Mexican painter, engraver and ceramicist who was known for his works on handmade paper. He studied lesser-known techniques for painting and papermaking from Japan, Egypt, Fiji, and France; his handmade paper is typically made of linen, cotton, or hemp. With these traditional approaches, he creates layers and adds new dimensions to his artworks.

Born in Sierra Hermosa, Zacatecas, Mexico, De la Rosa studied at the Autonomous University of Nuevo León and La Esmeralda in Mexico City. The Nuevo León government gave him a grant to study and work at Atelier Clot, the National School of Fine Arts in Paris, and the Dimitri Papageorgiou workshop in Spain. De la Rosa has taught courses in institutions in Argentina, Colombia, Japan, Puerto Rico, and Venezuela. His works have been exhibited at the Manuel Felguérez Museum of Abstract Art, Zacatecas, Mexico; the Amalgama Gallery, Brussels; and the Mexican Cultural Institute, Paris.

He died on 15 July 2021. He is survived by his three sons Pablo Emiliano, Natalia, and Valentina.

== Early life and education ==
Juan Manuel De la Rosa was born in Sierra Hermosa, a small village in the municipality of Villa de Cos, Zacatecas, in 1945. At the age of 17, he studied at the Arts Workshop at the Autonomous University of Nuevo León. In the years 1962 to 1963, he moved to Mexico City to continue his studies at the National School of Painting, Sculpture, and Engraving, "The Esmeralda". He also studied at the National Institute of Fine Arts and Literature (INBAL). In the late sixties (1969), he moved to the shoal area to study at the University of Guanajuato. He won a scholarship to study at the Atelier Clot, the Bramsen, the École des Beaux-Arts in Paris and Dimitri Papaguerguiu's workshop in Madrid.

== Career ==
He is a painter, engraver, and maker of paper and ceramics. Juan Manuel De la Rosa has throughout his career specialized studies on various techniques of making handmade paper in countries like Egypt, the United States, and Japan. He has also taught courses in this specialty at different institutions in various countries.

The painter presented the exhibition The Desert of Salt, on July 3 at the Headquarters of Art, located in the former Convent of San Francisco, Zacatecas. He has visited countries such as Venezuela, the United States, Switzerland, Belgium, Colombia, Argentina, Spain, and several states in Mexico. He has solo exhibitions since 1966 with its first exhibition in the Monterrey State Gallery. Since then, it has had more than 30 solo exhibitions in cities such as Aguascalientes, Puebla, Zacatecas Mexico City, Guanajuato, Morelia, Buenos Aires, Zurich, Madrid, Brussels, Caracas, San Francisco, and Bogotá.

== Exhibitions ==
Year	Name	Location	City	State	Country
2009	El desierto de la sal	Cuartel del Arte Museo	Pachuca	Hidalgo	Mexico
2008	La superficie es el papel	Centro Cultural Estación Indianilla	Mexico City	Mexico DF	Mexico
2007	Travesías	Museo de Arte Abstracto Manuel Felguérez		Zacatecas	Mexico
2007	Desplazamientos y travesías	Museo Francisco Cossío	San Luis Potosí	San Luís Potosí	Mexico
2005	El desierto y su corazón flotante	Galería Metropolitana, UAM	Mexico City	Mexico DF	Mexico
2005	El desierto y su corazón flotante	Mexico Casa Natal de Ramón López Velarde	Jerez	Zacatecas	Mexico.
2004	El sueño del desierto	Galería Arroyo de la Plata	Zacatecas	Zacatecas	Mexico
2002	Las nubes vegetales de Barichara	Instituto de Mexico	Madrid		Spain
2002	Barichara, lo visible de lo invisible		Colombia		Venezuela
2002		Galería Arroyo de la Plata	Zacatecas	Zacatecas	Mexico
2001	Un corazón flotante	Galería Arroyo de la Plata	Zacatecas	Zacatecas	Mexico
2001	Un corazón flotante	Galería Randall Erickson	Palm Springs	California	United States
2000		Estudio-Galería	Puebla	Puebla	Mexico
2000		Instituto de Bellas Artes, San Miguel de Allende		Guanajuato	Mexico
2000	Corrientes	Estudio Paraíso			Argentina
2000		Galería Randall Erickson	Palm Springs	California	United States.
2000		Galería Rahn	Zurich		Switzerland
1997		Museo de Arte Contemporáneo	Morelia	Michoacán	Mexico
1996		Museo Sacro	Caracas		Venezuela
1996		Ex Templo de San Agustín	Zacatecas	Zacatecas	Mexico
1996		Galería Irma Valerio	Zacatecas	Zacatecas	Mexico
1996		Orbe Galerìa de Arte	Cancún	Quintana Roo	Mexico
1995		Museo del Pueblo	Guanajuato	Guanajuato	Mexico
1992		Librería Francesa	Mexico City	Mexico DF	Mexico
1990		Centro Cultural de Mexico	Paris		France
1987		Iturralde Gallery	La Jolla	California	United States
1982		Galería López Quiroga	Mexico City	Mexico DF	Mexico
1981		Galería Viva Mexico	Caracas		Venezuela
1980		Galería Viva Mexico	Caracas		Venezuela
1980		Galerìa Miro	Monterrey	Nuevo León	Mexico
1979		Galería Kin	Mexico City	Mexico DF	Mexico
1977		The Mexican Museum	San Francisco	California	United States
1976		Galería Misrachi	Mexico City	Mexico DF	Mexico
1974		Galería Miró	Monterrey	Nuevo León	Mexico
1973		Galería Mendoza	Caracas		Venezuela
1972		Galería Edvard Munch			Mexico
1972		Galería Lepe	Puerto Vallarta	Jalisco	Mexico
1971		Galería de Arte Grabado	Caracas		Venezuela
1969		Galería Antonio Souza	Mexico City	Mexico DF	Mexico
1966		Galería Forma	Monterrey	Nuevo León	Mexico
