= Francesca Gargallo =

Italian-Mexican writer and philosopher (1956–2022)

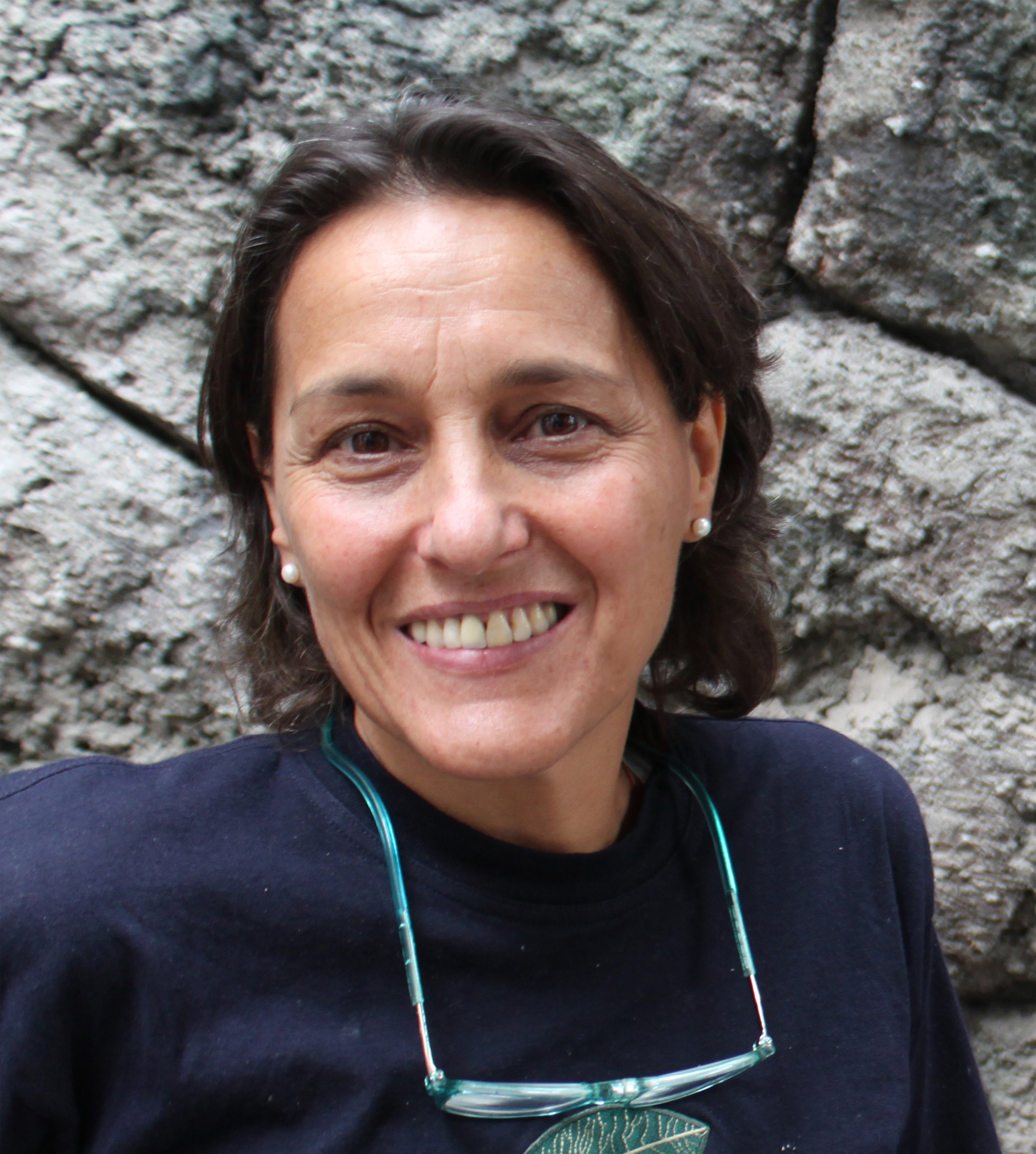
- Gargallo in 2012
- Born: Francesca Gargallo di Castel Lentini Celentani; 25 November 1956; Syracuse, Sicily, Italy
- Died: 3 March 2022 (aged 65)
- Education: National Autonomous University of Mexico
- Occupations: Writer and poet

Francesca Gargallo (25 November 1956 – 3 March 2022) was a Sicilian-born Mexican writer and poet.

== Life and career ==
Born in Syracuse, Italy as Francesca Gargallo di Castel Lentini Celentani, she studied philosophy at the Università degli studi di Roma and then at the National Autonomous University of Mexico (UNAM). A naturalized Mexican citizen, she lived in the country since 1979. She wrote many poetry books and novels such as; Calla mi amor que vivo, Estar en el mundo, La decisión del capitán, Marcha seca among others. Gargallo published work in magazines such as Proceso. Gargallo died of cancer on 3 March 2022, aged 65.

== Selected works ==
- Al paso de los días, Editorial Terracota, Ciudad de México, 2013
- Marcha seca, Ediciones Era, México, 1999, 76 pp. ISBN 9684114540
- La decisión del capitán, Ediciones Era, México, 1997, 181 pp. ISBN 9684114133.
- Los pescadores del Kukulkán, Aldus, México, 1995, 67 pp. ISBN 9686830413.
- Estar en el mundo, Ediciones Era, México, 1994, 135 pp. ISBN 9684113579.
- Calla mi amor que vivo, Ediciones Era, México, 1990, 147 pp. ISBN 9684113277.
- Días sin Casura, Leega Literaria, México, 1986, 90 pp. ISBN 9684950357.
- Días sin Casura, edición digital de Ars Longa, México, 2011, ISBN digital: 6326
