= Deaths in December 2021 =

The following is a list of notable deaths in December 2021.

Entries for each day are listed alphabetically by surname. A typical entry lists information in the following sequence:

- Name, age, country of citizenship at birth, subsequent country of citizenship (if applicable), reason for notability, cause of death (if known), and reference.

== December 2021 ==
=== 1 ===
- Rudolf Bernhardt, 96, German jurist, president of the European Court of Human Rights (1998).
- Ben Boo, 96, American politician, mayor of Duluth (1967–1975), member of the Minnesota House of Representatives (1984–1993).
- Bertram Bowyer, 2nd Baron Denham, 94, British politician, member of the House of Lords (1949–2021) and captain of the Honourable Corps of Gentlemen-at-Arms (1979–1991).
- Sherwin Carlquist, 91, American botanist and photographer.
- Albert M. Craig, 92, American academic and historian.
- John Cunningham, 83, Scottish Roman Catholic prelate, bishop of Galloway (2004–2014).
- Jeanne Daprano, 85, American runner and educator.
- Jean Demannez, 72, Belgian politician, mayor of Saint-Josse-ten-Noode (1999–2012).
- Abla Farhoud, 76, Canadian writer.
- Grand Jojo, 85, Belgian singer.
- John Hepworth, 77, Australian bishop, complications from amyotrophic lateral sclerosis.
- Anna-Liisa Hyvönen, 95, Finnish politician, MP (1972–1980).
- Enrique Jackson, 75, Mexican politician, deputy (2015–2018), member (1997–2006) and three-time president of the senate, heart attack.
- Bernie Jeffrey, 88, Australian footballer.
- Christian Kerr, 56, Australian political commentator and journalist (The Australian), co-founder of Crikey.
- Sonja Krause, 88, Swiss-American physical chemist.
- Alvin Lucier, 90, American composer (I Am Sitting in a Room, Music on a Long Thin Wire).
- Almerindo Marques, 81, Portuguese businessman, banker and politician, deputy (1983–1985) and president of Rádio e Televisão de Portugal (2002–2008).
- Jas Murphy, 98, Irish Gaelic footballer (Cork, Kerry).
- Keiko Nobumoto, 57, Japanese screenwriter (Cowboy Bebop, Wolf's Rain, Tokyo Godfathers), esophageal cancer.
- Seánie O'Leary, 69, Irish hurler (Cork, Youghal).
- Orm Øverland, 86, Norwegian literary historian.
- Nikolai Paltsev, 72, Russian politician, mayor of Stavropol (2008–2011).
- Rudolf Pohl, 97, German Roman Catholic prelate.
- Konrad Porzner, 86, German politician, MP (1962–1981, 1983–1990).
- Raimundo Revoredo Ruiz, 93, Peruvian Roman Catholic prelate, bishop-prelate of Juli (1988–1999).
- Alan Clive Roberts, 87, British materials scientist and engineer.
- Sir John Roch, 87, British judge, Lord Justice of Appeal (1993–2000).
- Razi Shirazi, 94, Iranian jurist and philosopher.
- Petr Uhl, 80, Czech journalist, activist and politician, member of the Federal Assembly (1990–1992).
- Rainbow George Weiss, 81, British serial political candidate.
- Suzette Winter, 90, American filmmaker.
- Miroslav Zikmund, 102, Czech writer and explorer.

=== 2 ===
- János Avar, 83, Hungarian journalist (Magyar Nemzet).
- Samuel Bhend, 78, Swiss politician, member of the Executive Council of Bern (1997–2006).
- Giuseppe Chiaretti, 88, Italian Roman Catholic prelate, archbishop of Perugia–Città della Pieve (1995–2009).
- Henry Clifford, 93, American Olympic field hockey player.
- Richard Cole, 75, English music manager (Led Zeppelin), cancer.
- Richard Costello, 70, American police officer, heart failure.
- Jos Dupré, 93, Belgian politician, mayor of Westerlo (1977–1982, 1989–1996).
- Neil Flanz, 83, Canadian pedal steel guitarist.
- Diana G. Gallagher, 75, American author (Obsidian Fate, Bad Bargain, Doomsday Deck), chronic obstructive pulmonary disease.
- Aldo Giordano, 67, Italian Roman Catholic prelate, apostolic nuncio to Venezuela (2013–2021) and the European Union (since 2021), COVID-19.
- Gérard Grandval, 91, French architect.
- Darlene Hard, 85, American Hall of Fame tennis player.
- Phil Harvey, 83, American entrepreneur and philanthropist, founder of DKT International.
- Hong Sung-woo, 81, South Korean politician, MP (1979–1988).
- Ian Hore-Lacy, 81, Australian nuclear industry communicator.
- Joaquín Jiménez Hidalgo, 85, Spanish politician, senator (1982–1986).
- Abdel Karim al Kabli, 89, Sudanese singer and poet.
- Michael Laucke, 74, Canadian classical and flamenco guitarist and composer.
- Lyndsey Leask, 86, New Zealand softball administrator.
- Richard Lerner, 83, American chemist.
- Tom McGarry, 84, Irish hurler, footballer and rugby union player.
- Bill McKenzie, Baron McKenzie of Luton, 75, British politician and life peer, member of the House of Lords (since 2004).
- Alex Orban, 82, Hungarian-American Olympic sabre fencer (1968, 1972, 1976).
- Poedjono Pranyoto, 85, Indonesian military officer and politician, regent of Cilacap (1979–1987), governor of Lampung (1988–1997) and deputy speaker of the MPR-R (1997–1999).
- Felice Salis, 83, Italian Olympic field hockey player (1960).
- Sir Antony Sher, 72, South African-born British actor (Stanley, Shakespeare in Love, The Wolfman), cancer.
- Lovro Šturm, 83, Slovenian jurist and politician, minister of justice (2004–2008) and president of the Constitutional Court (1997–1998).
- Lawrence Weiner, 79, American conceptual artist.

=== 3 ===
- Güldal Akşit, 61, Turkish politician, minister of culture and tourism (2002–2003), COVID-19.
- Nasser al-Dhaibani, 52–53, Yemeni army major general.
- Man Arai, 75, Japanese writer and singer.
- Eileen Ash, 110, English cricketer (Middlesex, national team).
- Vesma Baltgailis, 71, Latvian-born Canadian chess player.
- Doug Bolstorff, 90, American basketball player (Detroit Pistons) and coach.
- Jean Briane, 91, French politician, deputy (1971–2002).
- Kathryn Cave, 73, British author (Something Else).
- Françoise Delord, 81, French zookeeper, founder of the ZooParc de Beauval.
- Lamine Diack, 88, Senegalese businessman, sports administrator, and athlete, president of the IAAF (1999–2015).
- Horst Eckel, 89, German footballer (1. FC Kaiserslautern, SV Röchling Völklingen, West Germany national team), world champion (1954).
- Nathaniel Exum, 81, American politician, member of the Maryland House of Delegates (1975–1999) and Senate (1999–2011).
- Fortune FitzRoy, Duchess of Grafton, 101, British courtier, mistress of the Robes (since 1967).
- Marian Hadenko, 66, Ukrainian composer, singer, and television presenter.
- Peter Hayek, 64, American ice hockey player (Minnesota North Stars).
- Robert Holman, 69, British dramatist (Rafts and Dreams, A Thousand Stars Explode in the Sky).
- Wout Holverda, 63, Dutch footballer (Sparta, Fortuna Sittard), COVID-19.
- Claude Humphrey, 77, American Hall of Fame football player (Atlanta Falcons, Philadelphia Eagles).
- Lee Tae-bok, 70, South Korean politician, minister of health and welfare (2002).
- Claudia Levy, 77, American journalist and union activist.
- Peter Nagy, 56, Slovak Olympic slalom canoeist (1996, 2000).
- Mirco Nontschew, 52, German comedian (RTL Samstag Nacht). (body discovered on this date)
- Denis O'Brien, 80, American talent manager (George Harrison) and film producer (Monty Python's Life of Brian, Time Bandits).
- Melvin Parker, 77, American drummer (James Brown).
- Saul Raiz, 91, Brazilian politician, mayor of Curitiba (1975–1979).
- Jean Rosset, 84, French sculptor.
- Edward Shames, 99, American Army colonel, last surviving officer of Easy Company.
- Charlotte Mailliard Shultz, 88, American socialite, cancer.
- Sampath Tennakoon, 62, Sri Lankan actor (Saroja, Gini Avi Saha Gini Keli, Siri Raja Siri), lung cancer.
- Jim Troumbly, 93, American ice hockey player.
- Nina Urgant, 92, Russian actress (Tamer of Tigers, Belorussian Station, Bonus).
- Alfonso Vallejo, 78, Spanish playwright and poet.
- Momčilo Vukotić, 71, Serbian footballer (FK Partizan, FC Girondins de Bordeaux, Yugoslavia national team).
- Ronald S. Weinstein, 83, American pathologist.
- Jōji Yanami, 90, Japanese voice actor (Dragon Ball, Time Bokan, One Piece).

=== 4 ===
- Thoppil Anto, 81, Indian playback singer.
- John Barton, 77, British businessman, chairman of Next plc and EasyJet.
- Ron Blazier, 50, American baseball player (Philadelphia Phillies).
- Hans Blohm, 94, German-Canadian photographer and author.
- Sarath Chandrasiri, 57, Sri Lankan actor (Dr. Nawariyan, Mago Digo Dai, Ran Kevita), brain hemorrhage.
- Sabbaruddin Chik, 79, Malaysian politician, minister of tourism, arts and culture (1987–1996), MP (1982–1999), COVID-19.
- Carl Clowes, 77, Welsh medical practitioner.
- Martha De Laurentiis, 67, American film producer (Breakdown, Hannibal, U-571), cancer.
- Vinod Dua, 67, Indian journalist (Doordarshan, NDTV India), complications from COVID-19.
- John Flynn, 67, Canadian politician, New Brunswick MLA (1995–1999), cancer.
- Mahmoud Hammoud, 57, Lebanese football player (Nejmeh, national team) and manager (Shabab Sahel), COVID-19.
- Golam Hasnayen, 91, Bangladeshi lawyer.
- Stonewall Jackson, 89, American country singer ("Waterloo", "B.J. the D.J.", "I Washed My Hands in Muddy Water"), vascular dementia.
- Percy Johnson, 88, Australian football player (East Fremantle, Claremont) and coach (Swan Districts), cancer.
- Navid Khosh Hava, 30, Iranian footballer (Rah Ahan, Paykan, PAS Hamedan), cardiac arrest.
- Alois Kottmann, 92, German violinist and music pedagogue.
- Paul Lannoye, 82, Belgian politician, MEP (1989–2004).
- Andy McCabe, 76, Irish Gaelic footballer.
- Leonardo McNish, 75, Guatemalan footballer (Deportivo Malacateco, Cobán Imperial, national team).
- Boris Misnik, 83, Russian politician, deputy (1995–2000).
- Nirmal Nanan, 70, Trinidadian cricketer (Nottinghamshire).
- Mike Page, 81, American baseball player (Atlanta Braves).
- Trilochan Pradhan, 92, Indian physicist and academic administrator, vice-chancellor of Utkal University (1989–1991).
- Pierre Rabhi, 83, Algerian-born French environmentalist.
- Konijeti Rosaiah, 88, Indian politician, governor of Tamil Nadu (2011–2016) and Karnataka (2014), chief minister of Andhra Pradesh (2009–2010).
- Shivaram, 83, Indian actor (Bhajarangi, Mukunda Murari, Bangara s/o Bangarada Manushya), film producer and director, brain hemorrhage.
- Wu Xinzhi, 93, Chinese paleoanthropologist, member of the Chinese Academy of Sciences.
- Inua Wushishi, 81, Nigerian general, chief of Army staff (1981–1983).
- Xavier Ziani, 49, French volleyball player (Tourcoing Lille Métropole Volley-Ball, Paris Volley, national team), cardiac arrest.
- Shirley Zussman, 107, American sex therapist.

=== 5 ===
- Jorge Amaya, 87, Argentine Olympic equestrian.
- Aad Andriessen, 60, Dutch footballer (Sparta Rotterdam).
- Osman Arpacıoğlu, 74, Turkish footballer (Mersin İdman Yurdu, Fenerbahçe, national team).
- Lisle Austin, 85, Barbadian football administrator (Barbados Football Association).
- Yossef Bodansky, 67, Israeli-American political scientist and defense analyst.
- Gary Callander, 62, Scottish rugby union player (Kelso, national team) and coach (Watsonian), pancreatic cancer.
- Júlio Eduardo Zamith Carrilho, 75, Mozambican politician, minister of public works and housing (1975–1979), industry (1979–1980), and construction and water (1980–1986).
- Peter Cundall, 94, English-born Australian horticulturalist and television host (Gardening Australia).
- Jean-Paul Didierlaurent, 59, French writer, cancer.
- Bob Dole, 98, American politician, member of the U.S. House of Representatives (1961–1969) and Senate (1969–1996), lung cancer.
- Oleg Emirov, 51, Russian composer, arranger and keyboardist (Kolibri, Tequilajazzz).
- Jacques Robert Fresco, 93, American biochemist.
- Aurelio Galfetti, 85, Swiss architect.
- Harry Giles, 91, Canadian educator.
- Prithipal Singh Gill, 100, Indian military officer.
- Bill Glass, 86, American Hall of Fame football player (Baylor Bears, Cleveland Browns, Detroit Lions).
- Christine Haidegger, 79, Austrian writer.
- Mirelle Hernández, 46, American makeup artist (Miss Bala, Desperados, Ingobernable), injuries sustained in carjacking.
- Stevan Jelovac, 32, Serbian basketball player (JuveCaserta, Brose Bamberg, CAI Zaragoza), complications from brain hemorrhage.
- Manolo Jiménez, 79, Spanish footballer (FC Barcelona, RC Celta de Vigo).
- Herbert Knoblich, 82, German politician, president of the Landtag of Brandenburg (1990–2004).
- Sławomir Majusiak, 57, Polish long-distance runner.
- M. Sarada Menon, 98, Indian psychiatrist.
- Buddy Merrill, 85, American steel guitarist (The Lawrence Welk Show).
- Melinda Micco, 73, American filmmaker and scholar.
- John Miles, 72, British singer-songwriter and musician ("Music").
- Bunu Sheriff Musa, 74, Nigerian administrator and engineer.
- Scott Page-Pagter, 64, American voice actor and television producer (Power Rangers), cancer.
- David Parrish, 82, American artist.
- Andrew Pringle Jr., 94, American major general.
- Enzo Restuccia, 80, Italian drummer.
- Michel Rouche, 87, French historian and academic.
- Mark Rudinstein, 75, Russian film producer, actor and television presenter, founder of Kinotavr.
- Toni Santagata, 85, Italian folk singer.
- Nelson Sears, 95, American television broadcaster.
- Song Gisuk, 86, South Korean novelist.
- Bill Staines, 74, American folk musician, prostate cancer.
- Jacques Tits, 91, Belgian-born French mathematician (Tits alternative, Tits group, Tits metric).
- Wolfgang Troßbach, 94, German Olympic hurdler.
- Renato Turano, 79, Italian politician, senator (2006–2008, 2013–2018).
- Mario Turchetti, 77, Italian academic and historian, COVID-19.
- Demetrio Volcic, 90, Italian journalist (La Repubblica, TG1) and politician, MEP (1999–2004).
- Osamu Yatabe, 89, Japanese lawyer and politician, councillor (1974–1998).

=== 6 ===
- Hussein Suleiman Abu Saleh, 91, Sudanese politician, minister of foreign affairs (1988–1989, 1993–1995).
- André Aschieri, 84, French politician, deputy (1997–2002).
- Jørgen Barth-Jørgensen, 89, Norwegian Olympic weightlifter (1952).
- Klaus von Beyme, 87, German political scientist.
- Lena Blackbird, 88, American Cherokee artist.
- Thomas E. Dewey Jr., 89, American businessman.
- Teoman Duralı, 74, Turkish philosopher, cancer.
- Ebrahim Ebrahim, 84, South African politician.
- Richard Despard Estes, 93, American zoologist.
- George Fleming, 83, American football player (Winnipeg Blue Bombers) and politician, member of the Washington House of Representatives (1969–1971) and Senate (1971–1991).
- Ron Fleming, 84, American woodturning artist.
- Glenn Foster, 31, American football player (New Orleans Saints).
- Donald K. Fry, 84, American writer and journalism academic.
- Emma Gapchenko, 83, Russian archer, Olympic bronze medalist (1972).
- Fred Hiatt, 66, American journalist, editor, and columnist (The Washington Post), cardiac arrest.
- Skilyr Hicks, 23, American singer-songwriter.
- Thomas W. Horton, 101, New Zealand pilot (RNZAF, RAF).
- Olha Ilkiv, 101, Ukrainian partisan and liaison officer (Ukrainian Insurgent Army).
- Lindiwe Mabuza, 83, South African poet and politician, MP (1994–1999) and high commissioner to the United Kingdom (2001–2009).
- Medina Spirit, 3, American Thoroughbred racehorse, Kentucky Derby winner (2021), heart attack.
- Eugenio Minasso, 62, Italian politician, deputy (2008–2013), complications from COVID-19.
- Marvin Morgan, 38, English footballer (Plymouth Argyle, Aldershot Town, Shrewsbury Town), complications from cavernous hemangioma.
- L. Eudora Pettigrew, 93, American academic administrator.
- Jerome Lyle Rappaport, 94, American lawyer, political leader, and real estate developer.
- Aldo Rebecchi, 75, Italian politician, deputy (1987–2001).
- Julius S. Scott, 66, American author (The Common Wind).
- Elfriede Steurer, 96, Austrian Olympic sprinter.
- Masayuki Uemura, 78, Japanese video game engineer (Nintendo).
- Kåre Willoch, 93, Norwegian politician, prime minister (1981–1986), MP (1958–1989) and minister of trade (1963, 1965–1970).

=== 7 ===
- Lionel Antoine, 71, American football player (Chicago Bears).
- Aydin Balayev, 65, Azerbaijani historian and ethnologist.
- Carol Jenkins Barnett, 65, American businesswoman (Publix), complications from Alzheimer's disease.
- Mustafa Ben Halim, 100, Libyan politician, prime minister (1954–1957) and minister of foreign affairs (1954–1956).
- Steve Bronski, 61, Scottish keyboardist (Bronski Beat), smoke inhalation.
- Raja Collure, 83, Sri Lankan politician, MP (2000–2004) and governor of Uva (since 2019), COVID-19.
- Lamine Dieng, 70, Senegalese football manager (AS Douanes, ASC Niarry Tally, national team).
- Catherine Fournier, 66, French politician, senator (since 2017).
- Geoffrey Harcourt, 90, Australian economist.
- Joe Hernandez, 81, American football player (Toronto Argonauts, Edmonton Eskimos, Washington Redskins), COVID-19.
- Sir Christopher Hogg, 85, British business executive, chairman of GlaxoSmithKline (2002–2004).
- Pavel Hůla, 69, Czech classical violinist (Kocian Quartet, Pražák Quartet) and music educator.
- Suresh Jadhav, 72, Indian biotechnology executive, renal failure.
- Yury Karabasov, 82, Russian professor and politician, member of the State Duma (2007–2011).
- Donald McClarren, 83, American politician, member of the New Hampshire House of Representatives.
- Nanda Prusty, 102, Indian educator, COVID-19.
- Ronald Rensch, 55, German Olympic sailor.
- Matt Scherer, 38, American track and field athlete.
- Philippe Stevens, 84, Belgian Roman Catholic prelate, bishop of Maroua-Makolo (1994–2014).
- Greg Tate, 64, American music critic (The Village Voice) and musician (Burnt Sugar), co-founder of the Black Rock Coalition.
- Michel Thierry, 93, French industrialist.
- Claude Vandersleyen, 94, Belgian Egyptologist.
- Francis Warner, 84, British poet and playwright.

=== 8 ===
- Chris Achilleos, 74, Cypriot-born British illustrator.
- Bruce Arden, 94, American computer scientist.
- Hal E. Broxmeyer, 77, American microbiologist, thyroid cancer.
- Sylwester Chęciński, 91, Polish film and television director (Katastrofa, Sami swoi, Kochaj albo rzuć).
- Edwin Cranston, 89, American scholar.
- Kristina Đukić, 21, Serbian YouTuber, suicide.
- Tapulesatele Mauteni Esera, Samoan politician, MLA (2016–2021).
- Gerry Foley, 89, American-Canadian ice hockey player (New York Rangers, Toronto Maple Leafs, Los Angeles Kings).
- Mitsutoshi Furuya, 85, Japanese manga artist (Dame Oyaji, Bar Lemon Heart), cancer.
- Igor Gamula, 61, Ukrainian-Russian football player (Zaria Voroshilovgrad, SKA Rostov-on-Don) and manager (Rostov).
- Barry Harris, 91, American jazz pianist, complications from COVID-19.
- Susana Higuchi, 71, Peruvian politician, deputy (2000–2006) and first lady (1990–1994), cancer.
- Lars Høgh, 62, Danish football player (Odense Boldklub, national team) and coach, pancreatic cancer.
- Anne Hudson, 83, British literary historian.
- Jan Józwik, 69, Polish Olympic speed skater, COVID-19.
- Mustapha El Karouni, 53, Belgian lawyer and politician, Brussels-Capital Region MP.
- Ulla-Britta Lagerroth, 94, Swedish literary critic.
- Blackjack Lanza, 86, American Hall of Fame professional wrestler (WWWF, WWA, AWA).
- Daniel Laskin, 97, American surgeon and educator.
- Richie Lewis, 55, American baseball player (Florida Marlins, Detroit Tigers, Oakland Athletics).
- Chandidas Mal, 92, Indian musician.
- Robert Malinowski, 64, Polish Olympic volleyball player.
- Farida Mammadova, 85, Azerbaijani historian.
- Patricia Misslin, 81, American voice teacher and soprano.
- Alfredo Moreno, 41, Argentine footballer (Celaya, Ascenso MX, Shandong Luneng), stomach cancer.
- Dieter Murmann, 87, German lobbyist, chairman of the Economic Council Germany (1989–2000).
- Warren John Nutter, 84, American murderer.
- Mark Pike, 57, American football player (Buffalo Bills), non-Hodgkin lymphoma complicated by COVID-19.
- Phú Quang, 72, Vietnamese composer, complications from diabetes.
- Michel Quarez, 83, Syrian-born French painter and graphic artist.
- Robbie Shakespeare, 68, Jamaican bassist (Sly and Robbie, Black Uhuru) and record producer, complications from kidney surgery.
- John L. Sorenson, 97, American anthropologist, scholar and author.
- Jan Stuifbergen, 92, Dutch politician, mayor of Heerhugowaard (1980–1994).
- Malcolm Troup, 91, Canadian-born British pianist and musicologist.
- Andrzej Zieliński, 85, Polish sprinter, Olympic silver medallist (1964).
- Jacques Zimako, 69, French footballer (Bastia, Saint-Étienne, national team).
- Notable Indian military officers killed in the Indian Air Force Mil Mi-17 crash:
  - Bipin Rawat, 63, chairman of the Chiefs of Staff Committee (2019), chief of defence staff (since 2020) and chief of the Army Staff (2016–2019)
  - Lakhbinder Singh Lidder, 52, defence assistant to Bipin Rawat

=== 9 ===
- Danielle Adams, 38, Canadian politician, Manitoba MLA (since 2019), traffic collision.
- Shamim Alam Khan, 84, Pakistani military officer, Chairman Joint Chiefs of Staff Committee (1991–1994), COVID-19.
- Brian Aldridge, 81, New Zealand cricket umpire.
- Don Asmussen, 59, American cartoonist (San Francisco Chronicle), brain cancer.
- Billy J. Boles, 83, American general.
- Julie Brougham, 67, New Zealand Olympic equestrian (2016), cancer.
- Ryszard Brzuzy, 60, Polish trade unionist and politician, deputy (1989–1991).
- Christian Chagnon, 65, Canadian Olympic handball player.
- Donald Cozzens, 82, American Roman Catholic priest, author and lecturer, complications from COVID-19.
- Anthony Cullis, 75, British electronic engineer.
- Garth Dennis, 72, Jamaican reggae musician (Black Uhuru, The Wailing Souls), complications from pneumonia.
- Speedy Duncan, 79, American football player (San Diego Chargers, Washington Redskins).
- Gunter Hadwiger, 72, Austrian politician.
- Luis Irizar, 91, Cuban-born Spanish chef.
- Robert Jervis, 81, American political scientist.
- Gertraud Jesserer, 77, Austrian actress (Eva, My Daughter and I, I Learned It from Father), house fire.
- Enju Kato, 102, Japanese bhikkhu and politician, member of the Okazaki city council (1967–1984).
- David Lasley, 74, American singer-songwriter.
- Giosuè Ligios, 92, Italian politician, senator (1972–1983), MEP (1979–1989).
- Alice McGuire, 86, Canadian politician, Yukon MLA (1978–1982).
- David Mercer, 60, American political strategist and commentator, cancer.
- Aleksandr Neumyvakin, 81, Russian politician, deputy (1989–1991).
- Otar Patsatsia, 92, Georgian politician, prime minister (1993–1995), COVID-19.
- Carmen Salinas, 82, Mexican actress (María Mercedes, Abrázame muy fuerte, Under the Same Moon) and politician, deputy (2015–2018), complications from a stroke.
- Larry Sellers, 72, American actor (Dr. Quinn, Medicine Woman).
- Hiromi Shinya, 86, Japanese gastroenterologist, heart failure.
- Peter Spoden, 100, German Luftwaffe fighter pilot.
- Charles R. Steele, 88, American aerospace engineer.
- C. J. Stevens, 94, American author.
- Demaryius Thomas, 33, American football player (Denver Broncos, New York Jets, Houston Texans), Super Bowl champion (2016), seizure.
- Themsie Times, 72, South African actress (Allan Quatermain and the Lost City of Gold, Dangerous Ground, Stander).
- Al Unser, 82, American Hall of Fame racing driver, four-time Indianapolis 500 winner, IndyCar champion (1983, 1985), liver cancer.
- Lina Wertmüller, 93, Italian film director (Seven Beauties, Love and Anarchy, Swept Away) and screenwriter.
- Cara Williams, 96, American actress (The Defiant Ones, Pete and Gladys, Boomerang).
- Maryse Wolinski, 78, French writer and journalist (Sud Ouest, Le Journal du Dimanche).

=== 10 ===
- Jacques Auxiette, 81, French politician, president of the regional council of Pays de la Loire (2004–2015).
- Gabriel Calvo, 66, Spanish Olympic gymnast (1976, 1980).
- Romulo T. de la Cruz, 74, Filipino Roman Catholic prelate, archbishop of Zamboanga (since 2014).
- Oded Muhammad Danial, 59, Indonesian politician, mayor of Bandung (since 2018).
- Jim Emery, 87, American politician.
- Les Emmerson, 77, Canadian singer (Five Man Electrical Band), complications from COVID-19.
- Maria Gomori, 101, Hungarian-born Canadian family therapist.
- Pavel Karpf, 52, Swiss footballer (BSC Old Boys, FC Luzern), complications from a heart attack.
- Constantin Năsturescu, 81, Romanian footballer (Rapid București, Progresul Brăila, national team).
- Michael Nesmith, 78, American musician (The Monkees) and songwriter ("Different Drum", "Joanne"), Grammy winner (1982), heart failure.
- Ken Osinde, 59, Kenyan diplomat, ambassador to Germany (2010–2014).
- Carl Pasteryak, 71, American racing driver.
- Jean-Claude Perrot, 93, French historian.
- Enrico Pieri, 87, Italian survivor of the Sant'Anna di Stazzema massacre.
- Karin Praxmarer, 77, Austrian politician, councilor (1986–1996, 1999).
- Gene Prebola, 83, American football player (Oakland Raiders, Denver Broncos).
- Kev Reynolds, 78, English outdoor writer.
- Günther Rühle, 97, German journalist and theater critic.
- Sunil Soma Peiris, 72, Sri Lankan filmmaker (Kauda Bole Alice, Pissu Puso, Ohoma Harida).
- Tyler E. Stovall, 67, American historian, president of the American Historical Association (2017).
- Martin Strimitzer, 93, Austrian politician, president (1990) and member (1982–1992) of the Federal Council.
- Leland Wilkinson, 77, American statistician and computer scientist.

=== 11 ===
- Janusz Bargieł, 63, Polish politician, senator (2001–2005).
- Fjölnir Geir Bragason, 56, Icelandic tattoo artist.
- Mecnur Çolak, 54, Bulgarian-born Turkish footballer (Ludogorets Razgrad, Sarıyer, Fenerbahçe), complications from COVID-19.
- Kevin Drummond, 91, Canadian politician.
- Edward Esko, 71, American macrobiotic diet advocate.
- Ed Gayda, 94, American basketball player (Tri-Cities Blackhawks).
- Jack Hedley, 92, British actor (The New York Ripper, For Your Eyes Only, Colditz), heart attack.
- Hiroshi Hirata, 84, Japanese manga artist, heart failure.
- Phil Kerslake, 62, Welsh-born New Zealand television presenter, cancer.
- Vera Kistiakowsky, 93, American physicist and arms control activist.
- Christian Laskawiec, 69, French rugby league player (Racing Club Albi XIII, national team).
- Mel Lastman, 88, Canadian politician, mayor of North York (1973–1997) and Toronto (1998–2003).
- Richard Neal, 81, American police officer, commissioner of the Philadelphia Police Department (1992–1998), stroke.
- Juan Carlos Oyarzún, 70, Argentine politician, senator (1992–1998).
- Jalal Pishvaian, 91, Iranian actor.
- Hans Gerhard Ramler, 93, German politician, member of the Landtag of Schleswig-Holstein (1971–1987).
- Anne Rice, 80, American author (The Vampire Chronicles, Lives of the Mayfair Witches), complications from a stroke.
- Francisco Rodríguez Pérez, 82, Mexican politician, member (1973–1976, 1982–1985) and president (1983) of the Chamber of Deputies.
- Beverly Russell, 87, British-American journalist and editor, assisted suicide.
- Galina Samsova, 84, Russian ballet dancer.
- Manuel Santana, 83, Spanish Hall of Fame tennis player, Wimbledon champion (1966), three-time French Open champion, Olympic champion (1968).
- Mike Sharpe, 65, Bermudian Olympic sprinter (1976).
- Gunnar Talsethagen, 90, Norwegian footballer (Molde) and author.
- Kenneth von Heidecke, 68, American dancer.
- Dennis Ward, 74, Australian rugby league player (Canterbury-Bankstown Bulldogs, Manly Warringah Sea Eagles, national team), stomach cancer.
- Mohamed Selim Zaki, 97, Egyptian Olympic equestrian (1952, 1956, 1960). (death announced on this date)

=== 12 ===
- John Archer, 80, English footballer (Bournemouth & Boscombe Athletic, Port Vale, Chesterfield).
- Kåre Berg, 89, Norwegian Olympic ski jumper (1960).
- Sid Blanks, 80, American football player (Houston Oilers, Boston Patriots).
- Piotr Bryhadzin, 72, Belarusian historian and politician, minister of education (2001–2003).
- Eduardo Cavieres, 76, Chilean historian and academic.
- Nai-Ni Chen, 62, Taiwanese-American choreographer and dancer, drowning.
- Aristides Demetrios, 89, American sculptor.
- James P. Dugan, 92, American politician, member of the New Jersey Senate (1969–1977).
- Margareta Ekström, 91, Swedish author and translator.
- Vicente Fernández, 81, Mexican singer ("La Derrota", "Estos Celos", "El Último Beso") and actor, multiple Grammy Award winner, complications from a fall.
- Bernie Fowler, 97, American politician, member of the Maryland Senate (1983–1994).
- John F. Hawley, 63, American astrophysicist.
- Roland Hemond, 92, American baseball executive (Chicago White Sox, Baltimore Orioles, Arizona Diamondbacks).
- Piotr Iwaszkiewicz, 62, Polish political historian and diplomat, ambassador to Uzbekistan (2015–2020).
- C. K. Jain, 86, Indian civil servant, secretary general of the Lok Sabha (1992–1994), heart attack.
- Byron LaBeach, 91, Jamaican Olympic sprinter (1952).
- Maʻafu Tukuiʻaulahi, 66, Tongan noble and politician, MP (since 2008).
- Sir Paulias Matane, 90, Papua New Guinean diplomat and public servant, governor-general (2004–2010).
- Daniel Nlandu Mayi, 68, Congolese Roman Catholic prelate, auxiliary bishop of Kinshasa (1999–2008) and bishop of Matadi (2010–2021).
- Stanisław Nowak, 86, Polish Roman Catholic prelate, archbishop of Częstochowa (1984–2011).
- Toddy O'Sullivan, 87, Irish politician, TD (1981–1997) and lord mayor of Cork (1980–1981).
- Jimoh Oyewumi, Ajagungbade III, 95, Nigerian traditional ruler, Soun of Ogbomosho (since 1973).
- Asha Patel, 44, Indian politician, Gujarat MLA (since 2017), complications from dengue.
- Donny Petersen, 74, Canadian outlaw biker (Hells Angels).
- Francis Pizzulli, 71, American attorney.
- Martin Quinn, 83, Irish Gaelic footballer (Meath).
- Jimmy Rave, 39, American professional wrestler (NWA Wildside, TNA, ROH), staph infection.
- George Ryden, 81, Scottish footballer (Dundee, St Johnstone, Stirling Albion).
- Silvia Sayago, 66, Argentine politician, deputy (since 2021), multiple organ failure.
- Yury Sharov, 82, Russian fencer, Olympic champion (1964).
- Len Thornson, 88, Canadian ice hockey player (Fort Wayne Komets, Indianapolis Chiefs, Huntington Hornets).
- Tu Men, 61, Chinese actor (Genghis Khan, An End to Killing, Old Beast), esophageal cancer.
- André Vairolatto, 87, French Olympic boxer.
- Chalard Worachat, 78, Thai activist.

=== 13 ===
- Falco Accame, 96, Italian politician, deputy (1976–1983).
- Giannalberto Bendazzi, 75, Italian animation historian.
- Clyde Bennett, 89, American football player (Ottawa Rough Riders).
- Kevin Billington, 87, British film director (The Rise and Rise of Michael Rimmer, The Light at the Edge of the World, Interlude), cancer.
- Blackberri, 76, American singer-songwriter and community activist, complications from a heart attack.
- Walter D'Hondt, 85, Canadian rower, Olympic gold and silver medalist (1956, 1960).
- Álvaro Díaz Pérez, 70–71, Chilean economist and politician, ambassador to Brazil (2007–2010).
- Verónica Forqué, 66, Spanish actress (Bajarse al moro, Kika, What Have I Done to Deserve This?), suicide by hanging.
- Viktor Gnezdilov, 78, Russian politician, mayor of Nakhodka (1987–2004).
- Milt Graham, 87, American football player (Ottawa Rough Riders, Boston Patriots) and FBI agent.
- Élizabeth Herrgott, 80, French writer.
- Harbans Kapoor, 75, Indian politician, member (since 1989) and speaker (2007–2012) of the Uttarakhand Legislative Assembly.
- Liam Kavanagh, 86, Irish politician, TD (1969–1997), MEP (1973–1981) and minister for labour (1981–1983).
- Larry Kenney, 101, American basketball player.
- Fawzi Al-Kharafi, 76, Kuwaiti billionaire, CEO of M. A. Kharafi & Sons (since 2015).
- Teuvo Kohonen, 87, Finnish computer scientist.
- Lillian Luckey, 102, American baseball player (South Bend Blue Sox).
- Charles R. Morris, 82, American writer (Los Angeles Times, The Wall Street Journal) and banker, complications from dementia.
- Leszek Murzyn, 61, Polish politician, deputy (2001–2007).
- Georgios Panagiotopoulos, 91, Greek lawyer and politician.
- Aapo Perko, 97, Finnish Olympic shot putter.
- Pete Petcoff, 89, Canadian football player (Calgary Stampeders, Ottawa Rough Riders).
- John Salt, 84, English artist.
- Leonid Sharayev, 86, Ukrainian politician.
- Joe Simon, 85, American soul and R&B singer ("The Chokin' Kind", "Get Down, Get Down (Get on the Floor)", "Power of Love").
- Toby Slater, 42, British singer-songwriter and musician (Catch).
- Sergei Solovyov, 77, Russian film director (Wild Pigeon, Assa, Black Rose Is an Emblem of Sorrow, Red Rose Is an Emblem of Love), screenwriter and producer.
- Marek Szutowicz, 44, Polish football player (Lechia Gdańsk, Gedania 1922) and manager (Jaguar Gdańsk).
- Józef Tejchma, 94, Polish politician, deputy prime minister (1972–1976).
- Wang Xuezhen, 95, Chinese politician, party secretary of Peking University, alternate member of the 12th and 13th CCP Central Committees.

=== 14 ===
- Muamer Abdulrab, 39, Qatari footballer (Al-Sailiya, Al Kharaitiyat, national team).
- Božidar Bojović, 83, Montenegrin physician, endocrinologist, and politician, MP (1990–2005).
- Phil Chen, 75, Jamaican bassist (Manzarek–Krieger, Butts Band, Rod Stewart), cancer.
- Ian Cooper, 75, Australian footballer (St Kilda).
- Jacques Dewatre, 85, French diplomat, officer, and politician, director-general for external security (1991–2000).
- Riccardo Ehrman, 92, Italian journalist.
- María Guðmundsdóttir, 86, Icelandic actress (The Honour of the House, Dead Snow 2: Red vs. Dead, Næturvaktin).
- Audrey Henshall, 94, British archaeologist.
- Ian Hetherington, 69, British businessman, co-founder of Psygnosis.
- Kenny Hope, 80, Scottish football referee.
- Igor Irtyshov, 49, Russian serial killer, rapist, and pedophile, heart failure. (death announced on this date)
- Jethro, 73, British comedian, COVID-19.
- Spyros Kapernekas, 73, Greek footballer (Olympiacos, Aris Thessaloniki).
- Ken Kragen, 85, American music manager and producer ("We Are the World"), founder of Hands Across America.
- Abraham Lunggana, 62, Indonesian businessman and politician, member of the Jakarta Regional People's Representative Council (2009–2018) and the DPR (2019–2021), heart attack.
- Marek Moszczyński, 72, Polish politician, deputy marshal of Lower Silesian Voivodeship (2003–2004, 2006–2008).
- Mustafa Murrar, 91, Palestinian writer.
- Carol A. Niemeier, 87, American politician.
- Henry Orenstein, 98, Polish-born American Hall of Fame poker player and toymaker, COVID-19.
- Tony Perez, 90, American boxing referee.
- Bob Peters, 84, Canadian ice hockey coach (Bemidji State Beavers).
- Harry Read, 97, British soldier, commissioner of the Salvation Army.
- Miłogost Reczek, 60, Polish actor (Generał Nil).
- Sonny Rhodes, 81, American blues singer and guitarist.
- Jimmy Robson, 82, English footballer (Burnley, Barnsley, Bury).
- Tadeusz Ross, 83, Polish actor and politician, MP (2007–2011), MEP (2013–2014).
- Abd Al-Baqi Abd Karim Al-Sadun, 74, Iraqi military officer and politician.
- Victor Sillon, 93, French Olympic pole vaulter (1948, 1956, 1960).
- Rosita Sokou, 98, Greek journalist, author, and playwright, COVID-19.
- Sandra Meira Starling, 77, Brazilian politician, deputy (1991–1999).
- James Wharram, 93, British sailor and yacht designer.
- Daniel Widlöcher, 92, French psychiatrist and academic.
- Chris Wilkinson, 76, British architect, co-founder of WilkinsonEyre.
- Nikolai Yegorov, 100, Russian microbiologist and politician, deputy minister of higher education (1967–1988).
- Warren Zapol, 79, American anesthesiologist.

=== 15 ===
- Jesse Alexander, 92, American photographer.
- Frederick C. Baldwin, 92, Swiss-born American photographer.
- Maja Beutler, 85, Swiss writer.
- Nelly Commergnat, 78, French politician, deputy (1981–1986).
- Juan Ignacio Campos, 71, Spanish attorney, lieutenant attorney of the Supreme Court (since 2020), cancer.
- Vivian Cook, 81, British linguist.
- Ernst Fivian, 90, Swiss gymnast, Olympic silver medalist (1952).
- Flow La Movie, 36, Puerto Rican music producer (Ozuna, Bad Bunny), plane crash.
- Bridget Hanley, 80, American actress (Here Come the Brides, Harper Valley PTA), complications from Alzheimer's disease.
- Len Hauss, 79, American football player (Washington Redskins).
- bell hooks, 69, American feminist author (Ain't I a Woman?, Feminist Theory: From Margin to Center, All About Love: New Visions), kidney failure.
- Kim Yong-ju, 101, North Korean politician, vice president (1993–1997), vice premier (1974–1975) and head of the OGD (1959–1974). (death announced on this date)
- Francisco Kröpfl, 90, Argentine composer and music theorist.
- Hans Küppers, 82, German footballer (TSV 1860 Munich, 1. FC Nürnberg, national team).
- Günter Lach, 67, German politician, member of the Bundestag (2009–2017).
- Huguette Lachapelle, 79, Canadian politician, Quebec MLA (1981–1985).
- François Lissarrague, 74, French historian and anthropologist.
- Adam Łomnicki, 86, Polish evolutionary biologist.
- Alceste Madeira, 77, Brazilian politician, deputy (1990–2006), traffic collision.
- Carol Jean Mays, 88, American politician.
- Willie McSeveney, 92, Scottish footballer (Motherwell, Dunfermline Athletic).
- George W. Miller Jr., 91, American politician.
- Víctor Moro, 95, Spanish economist and politician, deputy (1977–1979).
- Fernando Ospina Hernández, 92, Colombian engineer and politician, deputy (1982–1986).
- Ramón Regueira, 86, Spanish footballer (Caudal Deportivo, Burgos CF).
- Rogério Samora, 63, Portuguese actor (Solidão, Uma Linda História de Amor, April Captains, Eccentricities of a Blonde-Haired Girl).
- Frédéric Sinistra, 41, Belgian kickboxer, COVID-19.
- André Souvré, 82, French basketball player (PUC, national team).
- Marilee Stepan, 86, American swimmer, Olympic bronze medalist (1952).
- Fayez Tarawneh, 72, Jordanian politician, prime minister (1998–1999, 2012), ambassador to the United States (1993) and chief of The Royal Hashemite Court (1998).
- Jim Tobin, 76, American economist and taxpayer activist.
- Bruce Tozer, 95, Australian cricketer.
- Lloyd L. Weinreb, 85, American law professor.
- Linda Whetstone, 79, British libertarian, free market campaigner and author.
- Wanda Young, 78, American singer (The Marvelettes).

=== 16 ===
- Valentino Bellucci, 46, Italian philosopher, sociologist, and writer, heart attack.
- Stéphane Bonduel, 102, Chinese-born French politician, senator (1980–1989).
- Robert Cumming, 78, American artist, sculptor and photographer, complications from Parkinson's disease.
- Pavle Dešpalj, 87, Croatian composer and conductor.
- Yves Dreyfus, 90, French épée fencer, Olympic bronze medalist (1956, 1964).
- Gérald Forton, 90, Belgian-born French comic book artist.
- Bert Fragner, 80, Austrian Iranologist.
- George Gekas, 91, American politician, member of the United States House of Representatives (1983–2003).
- Lucía Hiriart, 98, Chilean socialite, first lady (1974–1990), heart failure.
- Hub, 62, American bass guitarist (The Roots), multiple myeloma.
- Stefan Keil, 63, German diplomat, ambassador to Jamaica (since 2021), heart attack.
- Hiroshi Kuwashima, 89, Japanese politician, mayor of Morioka (1995–2003).
- Baruch A. Levine, 91, American biblical scholar (New York University).
- Bill Mahoney, 82, Canadian ice hockey coach (Minnesota North Stars), complications from dementia.
- Vasily Michurin, 105, Belarusian colonel.
- Taniela Moa, 36, Tongan rugby union player (Auckland, Section Paloise, national team).
- Peter Mulholland, 68, Australian rugby league coach, non-Hodgkin's lymphoma.
- Duma Nkosi, 64, South African politician, MP (1994–2001) and mayor of Ekurhuleni (2001–2008).
- Trevor Pinch, 69, British sociologist, cancer.
- Robie Porter, 80, Australian musician and record producer.
- Edith Prague, 96, American politician, member of the Connecticut House of Representatives (1982–1990) and Senate (1994–2012).
- Muhammad al-Qudwa, 75, Palestinian politician, governor of the Gaza Governorate (1996–2014).
- Doug Robinson, 91, British stuntman (Willow, The Living Daylights, A View to a Kill).
- Rusmono, 78, Indonesian military doctor.
- Alan B. Scott, 89, American ophthalmologist, developer of botulinum toxin.
- Manuel Seco, 93, Spanish lexicographer, linguist and philologist.
- Alimihan Seyiti, 135 (disputed), Chinese supercentenarian.
- Bob Speller, 65, Canadian politician, MP (1988–2004) and minister of agriculture and agri-food (2003–2004).
- Jacques Timmermans, 76, Belgian politician, MP (1987–1991), senator (1991–1995).
- Ben Tollefson, 94, American politician, member of the North Dakota House of Representatives (1985–2000) and Senate (2000–2008).
- Bogalay Tint Aung, 99, Burmese film director (Nge Kywan Swe) and composer.
- Sérgio Vieira, 80, Mozambican politician and poet.

=== 17 ===
- Hussaini Akwanga, 77, Nigerian politician, minister of labour and productivity (2003).
- Eve Babitz, 78, American visual artist and author.
- Sa'dulla Begaliyev, 66–67, Uzbek politician, hokim of Andijan Region (2004–2006).
- Lalage Bown, 94, English educator and women's literacy advocate.
- Milt Carthens, 60, American football player (Indianapolis Colts).
- Chen Sung-young, 80, Taiwanese actor (City of Sadness, The Dull Ice Flower, Dust of Angels).
- Gabriel Cohn-Bendit, 85, French-Burkinabè activist and teacher.
- Doug Ericksen, 52, American politician, member of the Washington House of Representatives (1999–2011) and Senate (since 2011), COVID-19.
- José Pablo Feinmann, 78, Argentine philosopher, writer (Últimos días de la víctima) and playwright (Eva Perón: The True Story, Ay Juancito), complications from a stroke.
- José Fernández Arteaga, 88, Mexican Roman Catholic prelate, archbishop of Chihuahua (1991–2009) and bishop of Apatzingán (1974–1980) and Colima (1980–1988).
- Richard Fryman, 86, American politician.
- Majid Al Futtaim, 86–87, Emirati businessman, founder of the Majid Al Futtaim Group.
- Alexander Garvin, 80, American urban planner.
- Dah Sagbadjou Glele, 90s, Beninese royal, king of Dahomey (since 2019).
- Brian Green, 87, English mass spectrometrist.
- Herb Guenther, 80, American politician, member of the Arizona House of Representatives (1987–1993) and senate (1999–2003).
- Raymond Guth, 97, American film and television actor (Gunsmoke, Death Valley Days, Bonanza).
- Bill Hill, 81, English geneticist, co-discoverer of the Hill–Robertson effect.
- Harry Jacobs, 84, American football player (Boston Patriots, Buffalo Bills, New Orleans Saints).
- R. L. Jalappa, 96, Indian politician, minister of textiles (1996–1998) and MP (1996–2009).
- Ron Knight, 89, Canadian politician.
- Perko Kolevski, 76, Macedonian politician, minister of health (1991–1992).
- Dave Magazu, 64, American football coach (Carolina Panthers, Denver Broncos, Chicago Bears).
- John Mitchinson, 89, English operatic tenor.
- Frank Mula, 71, American television writer and producer (The Simpsons, Cosby, Life with Bonnie), Emmy winner (2000, 2001).
- Mladen Naletilić Tuta, 75, Bosnian paramilitary commander and convicted war criminal.
- Rafik Petrosyan, 81, Armenian politician, member of the National Assembly (1990–1995, 2003–2012).
- Burt Prelutsky, 81, American television writer (M*A*S*H, Diagnosis: Murder, Dragnet).
- Árpád Pusztai, 91, Hungarian-born British biochemist and nutritionist (Pusztai affair).
- Yurii Reshetnyak, 92, Russian mathematician and academician.
- Russell Maroon Shoatz, 78, American militant (Black Liberation Army) and convicted murderer, colorectal cancer.
- Torhild Staahlen, 74, Norwegian opera singer.
- Dimitrios Stefanakos, 85, Greek footballer (Olympiacos, national team).
- Filippo Tasso, 81, Italian footballer (Roma, Sambenedettese, Lecce).
- Greg Tebbutt, 64, Canadian ice hockey player (Pittsburgh Penguins).
- Trevor Thompson, 66, English football player (Lincoln City, Newport County) and manager (Boston Town). (death announced on this date)
- Siegfried Valentin, 85, German Olympic middle-distance runner.
- Klaus Wagenbach, 91, German author and publisher.

=== 18 ===
- Harry Azhar Azis, 65, Indonesian economist and politician, MP (2004–2014) and chairman of the Audit Board (2014–2017).
- Tawfik Bahri, 69, Tunisian actor.
- Osagi Bascome, 23, Bermudian footballer (Darlington, national team), stabbed.
- Laurent Bouvet, 53, French political scientist, complications from amyotrophic lateral sclerosis.
- Custom, 54, Canadian-American musician, cardiac arrest.
- Ladislav Falta, 85, Czech sport shooter, Olympic silver medallist (1972).
- Jan Fransz, 84, Dutch footballer (Ajax, Haarlem).
- Manuel Garza González, 88, Mexican politician, deputy (1991–1994, 2000–2003).
- Krystyna Gozdawa-Nocoń, 72, Polish politician, deputy voivode of Pomeranian Voivodeship (2003–2006).
- Bernd Grimmer, 71, German politician, member of the Landtag of Baden-Württemberg (since 2016), COVID-19.
- Enzo Gusman, 74, Maltese singer.
- Issa Kassim Issa, 54, Tanzanian politician, MP (2005–2010).
- Sayaka Kanda, 35, Japanese actress (School Wars: Hero, Sword Art Online, Idoly Pride) and singer, fall.
- Kangol Kid, 55, American rapper and songwriter (UTFO), colon cancer.
- Pierre Lepape, 80, French journalist, writer, and literary critic.
- Hans Mark, 92, German-born American aerospace engineer, secretary of the Air Force (1979–1981).
- Renée Martel, 74, Canadian singer, pneumonia.
- Terry McManus, 75, Canadian singer-songwriter.
- Joan Murray, 84, American journalist.
- G. T. Nanavati, 86, Indian jurist, justice of the Supreme Court (1995–2000), heart attack.
- Bagrat Oghanian, 40, Armenian boxer.
- Tilman Pünder, 88, German politician, Regierungspräsident of Giessen (1987–1989).
- Louis-Ferdinand de Rocca Serra, 85, French politician, senator (1994–2001).
- Richard Rogers, Baron Rogers of Riverside, 88, Italian-born British architect (Centre Pompidou, Lloyd's building, Millennium Dome).
- Olina Storsand, 99, Norwegian politician, member of the Storting (1965–1977).
- Robert Venables Sr., 88, American politician, member of the Delaware Senate (1989–2015).
- David Wagoner, 95, American poet and novelist.
- Eliezer Waldman, 84, Israeli Orthodox rabbi and politician, MK (1984–1990).

=== 19 ===
- Boško Abramović, 70, Serbian chess grandmaster.
- Ron Anderson, 75, American vocal coach (Axl Rose, Chris Cornell, Ozzy Osbourne).
- Ian Barker, 86, Australian barrister.
- Alan Cardy, 76, Australian rugby union player (national team).
- Dick Carson, 92, American television director (Wheel of Fortune, The Merv Griffin Show, The Tonight Show).
- Billy Conway, 65, American drummer (Morphine, Treat Her Right), cancer.
- Judith Davidoff, 94, American violist and cellist.
- Drakeo the Ruler, 28, American rapper, stabbed.
- Kurt Edler, 71, German politician, member of the Hamburg Parliament (1985–1986, 1993–1997).
- Spartak Elmazi, 34, Albanian footballer (Pogradeci, Tomori, Dinamo Tirana).
- Antoine Faivre, 87, French literary scholar and occultist.
- Nicholas Georgiade, 88, American actor (The Untouchables).
- Carie Graves, 68, American rower, Olympic champion (1984).
- Jake Grey, 37, Samoan rugby union player (national team).
- Robert H. Grubbs, 79, American chemist (Grubbs catalyst), Nobel Prize laureate (2005).
- Oleg Haslavsky, 73, Russian poet and translator.
- Earle Herrera, 72, Venezuelan journalist and politician, deputy (since 2017).
- Sally Ann Howes, 91, English actress (Chitty Chitty Bang Bang, Brigadoon, The Admirable Crichton) and singer.
- Johnny Isakson, 76, American politician, member of the U.S. House (1999–2005), Senate (2005–2019) and Georgia House of Representatives (1977–1991), Parkinson's disease.
- Madhur Kapila, 79, Indian novelist and literary critic, cardiac arrest.
- Kim Moon-ki, 89, South Korean politician, MP (1985–1996).
- Anita Lallande, 72, Puerto Rican Olympic swimmer (1964).
- Andrei Malyukov, 73, Russian film director (In the Zone of Special Attention, Express on Fire, Black Hunters) and screenwriter, COVID-19.
- Carlos Marín, 53, German-born Spanish singer (Il Divo), COVID-19.
- Ignacio Martín Amaro, 77, Spanish politician, senator (1982–1986). (death announced on this date)
- Aníbal Meléndez Rivera, 73, Puerto Rican politician, mayor of Fajardo (1989–2020).
- Juan Norat, 77, Spanish footballer (Pontevedra CF, CD Ourense).
- Gérard Poirier, 91, Canadian actor (The Heat Line, Matusalem, Stay with Me).
- Russ Potts, 82, American politician, member of the Virginia Senate (1992–2008).
- Frans Lebu Raya, 61, Indonesian politician, governor of East Nusa Tenggara (2008–2018).
- Curt Ridley, 70, Canadian ice hockey player (Vancouver Canucks, Toronto Maple Leafs, New York Rangers).
- Elio Roca, 78, Argentine singer and actor (Love in Flight), heart failure.
- Adam Rosen, 37, American-born British Olympic luger (2006, 2010, 2018), cancer.
- Vytautas Straižys, 85, Lithuanian astronomer.
- Robert Strichartz, 78, American mathematician.
- Ed van Thijn, 87, Dutch politician, MP (1967–1983), minister of the interior (1981–1982, 1994), mayor of Amsterdam (1983–1994).
- Chowdhury Akmal Ibne Yusuf, 75, Bangladeshi politician, MP (1996, 2002–2008).

=== 20 ===
- Richard J. Allen, 88, American politician.
- Fred Andrews, 69, American baseball player (Philadelphia Phillies).
- Luboš Andršt, 73, Czech guitarist (Framus Five, Energit, Jazz Q) and composer.
- Viktor Antikhovich, 76, Russian football player (Druzhba Yoshkar-Ola, Rubin Kazan) and manager (Krylia Sovetov).
- Kimera Bartee, 49, American baseball player (Detroit Tigers) and coach (Pittsburgh Pirates, Philadelphia Phillies), complications from a brain tumour.
- Heinz Bigler, 72, Swiss footballer (FC St. Gallen).
- Norberto Boggio, 90, Argentine footballer (Atlante).
- Anthony W. Bradley, 87, British barrister, academic and expert in UK constitutional law.
- Jorge Busti, 74, Argentine politician, three-time governor of Entre Ríos Province, senator (2001–2003) and deputy (1999–2001).
- Jiří Čadek, 86, Czech footballer (Dukla Prague).
- Pierre Cassignard, 56, French actor (The Conquest, A French Woman, Seventh Heaven), cancer.
- Mamadú Iaia Djaló, c. 59, Bissau-Guinean politician, minister of justice (2018–2019) and foreign affairs (2000–2001).
- Elizabeth Fennema, 93, American educator.
- Giuseppe Galante, 84, Italian rower, Olympic silver medallist (1960, 1964).
- Stu Griffing, 95, American Olympic rower.
- Hasan Irlu, 61–62, Iranian diplomat.
- Asma Khader, 69, Jordanian politician, minister of culture (2004–2005), senator (2014–2015).
- Jean-Paul Laumond, 68, French robotician.
- Donald C. MacKenzie, 90, Canadian general.
- Jake McKinlay, 20, New Zealand basketball player, traffic collision.
- Sarat Kumar Mukhopadhyay, 90, Indian poet and translator, cardiac arrest.
- Willard H. Murray Jr., 90, American politician, member of the California State Assembly (1988–1996).
- Christopher Newton, 85, Canadian actor and director.
- Reinier Paping, 90, Dutch speed skater, Elfstedentocht winner (1963).
- Jack Paradise, 96, American pediatrician.
- Michał Rokicki, 37, Polish Olympic swimmer (2008).
- Mushtari Shafi, 83, Bangladeshi writer, liver disease.
- Jack Whillock, 79, American baseball player (Detroit Tigers).
- Umar Zahir, 85, Maldivian politician, minister of sports (1988–1993) and public works (1993–2004), COVID-19.

=== 21 ===
- George Alexander Albrecht, 86, German conductor (Staatsoper Hannover), composer and musicologist.
- John Murray Campbell, 90, Canadian politician.
- Chen Niannian, 80, Chinese nuclear engineer, member of the Chinese Academy of Engineering.
- Jaime Comas, 85, Spanish screenwriter (A Fistful of Dollars, The Shark Hunter, The Glass Sphinx).
- Mary Fenner Dallman, 86, American neuroendocrinologist.
- John Galbraith, 98, American politician, member of the Ohio House of Representatives (1967–1986).
- Sir Carlyle Glean, 89, Grenadian politician, governor-general (2008–2013).
- P. A. Ibrahim Haji, 78, Indian entrepreneur.
- Ivan Hopta, 63, Slovak politician, member of the National Council (2002–2006).
- Muhammad Yusuf Islahi, 89, Indian Islamic scholar.
- Vassos Karageorghis, 92, Cypriot archaeologist.
- Eberhard Mahle, 88, German racing driver.
- Myrna Manzanares, 75, Belizean cultural activist.
- Giovanni Mastel, 78, Italian Olympic ice hockey player.
- Ian Matos, 32, Brazilian Olympic diver (2016), lung infection.
- Geneviève Meurgues, 91, French explorer and botanist.
- Christian Ouellet, 87, Canadian politician, MP (2006–2011).
- Gary Lee Sampson, 62, American spree killer.
- Osman Sapian, 69, Malaysian politician, Johor MLA (1999–2013, since 2018) and Menteri Besar (2018–2019), stroke.
- Tahir Shamsi, 59, Pakistani hematologist, stroke.
- George Sheltz, 75, American Roman Catholic prelate, auxiliary bishop of Galveston-Houston (2012–2021).
- Nkodo Sitony, 62, Cameroonian singer.
- Liv Thorsen, 86, Norwegian actress (Mot i brøstet).
- Anthony Williams, 90, Trinidadian steelpan musician and designer, complications from COVID-19.

=== 22 ===
- Edgar H. Brown, 94, American mathematician.
- Alessandro Casse, 75, Italian alpine skier.
- Mava Chou, 32, Swiss influencer.
- Richard Conway, 79, English visual effects artist (The Adventures of Baron Munchausen, Brazil, Sunshine).
- Dansili, 25, British thoroughbred racehorse and sire.
- Antonio Falconio, 83, Italian politician, deputy (1979–1983), president of Abruzzo (1995–2000).
- Lester E. Fisher, 100, American zoologist, director of Lincoln Park Zoo (1962–1992).
- Vicente de la Fuente García, 87, Spanish politician, mayor of Betanzos (1979–1983).
- Richard S. Gebelein, 75, American politician and judge.
- Robert Holland, 81, American business executive, CEO of Ben & Jerry's (1995–1996).
- Egill Skúli Ingibergsson, 95, Icelandic politician, mayor of Reykjavík (1978–1982).
- Edward B. Jelks, 99, American archaeologist.
- George Keiser, 75, American politician, member of the North Dakota House of Representatives (since 1992), complications from amyotrophic lateral sclerosis.
- Bob Keselowski, 70, American racing driver (NASCAR), cancer.
- Thomas Kinsella, 93, Irish poet, translator, and editor.
- Corporal Kirchner, 64, American professional wrestler (WWF, NJPW, W*ING), heart attack.
- Helmut Kunisch, 85, Swiss Olympic long-distance runner (1968).
- Naomi Lazard, 93, American poet and author.
- Robin Le Mesurier, 68, British guitarist (The Wombles), cancer.
- Serge Lentz, 87, French writer and journalist.
- Frédéric Manns, 79, French biblist.
- Thandathu Jongilizwe Mabandla, 95, South African tribal leader, chief executive councillor (1968–1972) and chief minister (1972–1973) of Ciskei.
- Poh Lip Meng, 52, Singaporean sport shooter.
- Barbara Shaw, 79, American politician, member of the New Hampshire House of Representatives (since 2010), complications from surgery.
- Ivan Shilov, 91, Russian politician, Soviet deputy minister of internal affairs (1988–1991).
- H. R. Stoneback, 80, American academic and poet.
- Franklin A. Thomas, 87, American community developer and philanthropist, president and CEO of the Ford Foundation (1979–1996).
- P. T. Thomas, 71, Indian politician, MP (2009–2014) and three-time Kerala MLA, cancer.
- Gilberto Valbuena Sánchez, 92, Mexican Roman Catholic prelate, bishop of Colima (1989–2005).
- Eddie Wallace, 71, Irish football player and manager (Athlone Town).
- Jürg Wyttenbach, 86, Swiss composer and pianist.
- Dmitry Zimin, 88, Russian radio scientist and businessman, founder of VimpelCom.

=== 23 ===
- Zubir Amin, 82, Indonesian diplomat, ambassador to Madagascar (1979–1982) and Turkey (1982–1984).
- Teddy Bailey, 77, American football player (Buffalo Bills, Boston Patriots).
- Dan Berindei, 98, Romanian historian.
- Robert J. Birnbaum, 94, American financial executive, president of the American (1977–1985) and New York Stock Exchanges (1985–1988).
- Francis Boisson, 93, Monégasque Olympic sports shooter (1960, 1972).
- Ted Byfield, 93, Canadian journalist and publisher, founder of Alberta Report and BC Report.
- Chung Ung, 93, South Korean politician, member of the National Assembly (1988–1992).
- Eugeniusz Czepiel, 92, Polish beekeeper and politician, MP (1981–1985).
- Bernard Dewulf, 61, Belgian poet and journalist.
- Chris Dickerson, 82, American bodybuilder, Mr. Olympia (1982).
- Joan Didion, 87, American writer (Run, River, Slouching Towards Bethlehem, The Year of Magical Thinking), complications from Parkinson's disease.
- Lars Eighner, 73, American writer.
- Donald H. Elliott, 89, American urban planner.
- Karen Ferguson, 80, American workers' rights advocate, founder of Pension Rights Center, cancer.
- Roberto Gerlein, 83, Colombian politician, deputy (1968–1974), senator (1976–2018) and minister of economic development (1982–1983), complications from urinary tract infection.
- Avio Lucioli, 93, Italian Olympic hammer thrower.
- Bob McCammon, 80, Canadian ice hockey coach and executive (Vancouver Canucks, Philadelphia Flyers).
- Grace Mirabella, 91, American magazine editor, editor-in-chief of Vogue (1971–1988) and founder of Mirabella.
- Sharyn Moffett, 85, American actress (My Pal Wolf, The Body Snatcher, Mr. Blandings Builds His Dream House).
- Patrick N'Guema N'Dong, 64, Gabonese journalist.
- Bill Neal, 85, American defense attorney, historian and non-fiction writer.
- Françoise Nuñez, 64, French photographer.
- Bartolomeo Pepe, 59, Italian politician, senator (2013–2018), COVID-19.
- Keith Rae, 104, Australian footballer (Carlton, Richmond).
- Benito Rigoni, 85, Italian bobsledder, Olympic bronze medalist (1964).
- Omar Saavedra Santis, 77, Chilean writer.
- Stanley M. Truhlsen, 101, American ophthalmologist.
- Francisco Valada, 80, Portuguese Olympic cyclist (1960).
- Dragan Vujadinović, 68, Serbian politician, economist, and journalist, deputy (2007–2009) and mayor of Kosjerić (2009–2012).
- Louie L. Wainwright, 98, American corrections administrator.
- Elżbieta Żebrowska, 76, Polish Olympic hurdler (1968).

=== 24 ===
- Bill Attewell, 89, Canadian politician, MP (1984–1993).
- Meor Yusof Aziddin, 54, Malaysian folk singer, COVID-19.
- Baiba Bičole, 90, Latvian-born American poet.
- Boss Ko, 47, Burmese politician, acting chief minister of Kayah State (since 2020) and member of the Kayah State Hluttaw (since 2016).
- Shirley Bottolfsen, 87, Irish philanthropist.
- Jozef Burian, 60, Slovak politician, member of the National Council (2002–2020), minister of labor, social affairs, and family (2012–2016).
- J. D. Crowe, 84, American banjo player and bluegrass band leader (New South).
- Norman R. DeBlieck, 95, American politician, member of the Minnesota House of Representatives (1987–1989).
- Harvey Evans, 80, American actor (West Side Story, Bank Shot, Enchanted).
- Tesfaye Gebreab, 53, Eritrean writer.
- Gwendolyn Killebrew, 80, American operatic contralto (Deutsche Oper am Rhein).
- Willibert Kremer, 82, German football player (Viktoria Köln, Hertha BSC, MSV Duisburg) and coach.
- Ganeshwar Kusum, 87, Indian politician, MP (1984–1990).
- Mona Latif-Ghattas, 75, Egyptian-born Canadian author and poet.
- Joycelynne Loncke, 80, Guyanese academic.
- Oscar López Ruiz, 83, Argentine composer, record producer and guitarist.
- Paul Lyall, 77, British table tennis player, Paralympic champion (1964, 1968).
- Raúl Madero, 82, Argentine footballer (Boca Juniors, Estudiantes, national team).
- Vojvoda Malesija, 51, Montenegrin football player (Zeta, Radnički Niš, Elista) and manager.
- Anthony May, 75, British actor (Man on Horseback, Cromwell, No Blade of Grass).
- Terry Morrison, 70, New Zealand rugby union player (Otago, national team), heart attack.
- Deborah Nickerson, 67, American geneticist, abdominal cancer.
- Ron Page, 70, Australian footballer (Williamstown, South Melbourne).
- Ram Krushna Patnaik, 81, Indian politician, six-time Odisha MLA.
- Wolfgang Pfahl, 74, German politician, member of the Bürgerschaft of Bremen (1997–2007).
- Edward Power, 85, American actor.
- K. V. Raju, 67, Indian film director and screenwriter (Yuddha Kaanda, Indrajith, Indrajeet).
- Clark Richert, 80, American artist.
- K. S. Sethumadhavan, 90, Indian film director (Oppol, Panitheeratha Veedu, Karakanakadal) and screenwriter.
- Vladimir Tatosov, 95, Russian actor (Intervention, Failure of Engineer Garin, The Twentieth Century Approaches), COVID-19.
- Jim Teal, 71, American football player (Detroit Lions).
- Birgit Vanderbeke, 65, German writer.
- José Villegas, 87, Mexican footballer (Guadalajara, national team).
- Gunaratna Weerakoon, 74, Sri Lankan politician, MP (2004–2015).

=== 25 ===
- Madhavan Ayyappath, 87, Indian poet and translator.
- Princess Maryam Begum, 85, Afghan princess.
- Carmen Bourassa, 79, Canadian television producer (Passe-Partout).
- Eric Cockeram, 97, British politician, MP (1970–1974, 1979–1987).
- Harry Colomby, 92, German-born American talent manager (Michael Keaton) and screenwriter (Johnny Dangerously, Working Stiffs), complications from a fall.
- Bruce Davis, 65, American football player (Oakland/Los Angeles Raiders, Houston Oilers).
- Jacques Drillon, 67, French writer and journalist, cancer.
- Aurèle Gervais, 88, Canadian politician.
- John Gleeson, 82, Australian rugby league player (Wynnum-Manly, Queensland, national team).
- Guenshi Ever, Beninese singer.
- Naren Gupta, 73, Indian venture capital investor.
- Tiffini Hale, 46 American actress and singer (The Mickey Mouse Club), (The Party), cardiac arrest.
- Ray Illingworth, 89, English cricketer (Yorkshire, Leicestershire, national team), oesophageal cancer.
- Theodore Kisiel, 91, American philosopher.
- Edy Korthals Altes, 97, Dutch diplomat.
- Brij Lal, 69, Fijian historian.
- Albert Likhanov, 86, Russian writer and screenwriter (Team 33).
- Janice Long, 66, English disc jockey (BBC Radio 1, BBC Radio Wales) and television presenter (Top of the Pops), pneumonia.
- Thomas Lovejoy, 80, American ecologist, pancreatic cancer.
- Richard Marcinko, 81, American naval officer, commander of SEAL Team Six (1980–1983), heart attack.
- Roy Miller, 86, British academic and educator, principal of Royal Holloway, University of London (1982–1985).
- Candy Palmater, 53, Canadian comedian, broadcaster (Definitely Not the Opera), and actress (Trailer Park Boys).
- Colin Philp Jr., 57, Fijian Olympic sailor (1988).
- Jonathan Spence, 85, English-born American historian and sinologist, complications from Parkinson's disease.
- Janet Tempest, 91, Argentine-born British landowner.
- Wayne Thiebaud, 101, American painter.
- Jean-Marc Vallée, 58, Canadian film and television director (Dallas Buyers Club, The Young Victoria, Big Little Lies), Emmy winner (2017), cardiac arrhythmia stemming from atherosclerosis.
- Ralph Warburton, 97, American Olympic ice hockey player (1948).
- Guido Weiss, 92, Italian-born American mathematician.

=== 26 ===
- David Baker, 86, English cricketer.
- Abayomi Barber, 93, Nigerian artist.
- Gary B. Beikirch, 74, American combat medic, Medal of Honor recipient.
- Bruce Bromberg, 80, American record producer.
- Giacomo Capuzzi, 92, Italian Roman Catholic prelate, bishop of Lodi (1989–2005).
- Derrick Goodwin, 86, English theatre and television director (Holding the Fort, Dear Mother...Love Albert), producer (On the Buses), and writer.
- Nell Hall Williams, 88, American quilter.
- Bob Hammer, 91, American jazz pianist and composer.
- Denis J. Hickie, 78, Irish rugby union player (Leinster, national team, Barbarians).
- Steve Jenkins, 69, American author, splenic artery aneurysm.
- Paul B. Kidd, 76, Australian radio broadcaster (2UE, 2GB) and writer, cancer and heart disease.
- Henri Losch, 90, Luxembourgish actor, screenwriter, and linguist.
- Fred McLafferty, 98, American chemist (McLafferty rearrangement).
- Mameve Medwed, 79, American novelist.
- Diego Montiel, 25, Argentine footballer (Atlético de Rafaela, Juventud Unida), meningitis.
- Karolos Papoulias, 92, Greek politician, president (2005–2015), deputy (1977–2004) and minister of foreign affairs (1985–1989, 1993–1996).
- Phua Bah Lee, 89, Singaporean politician, MP (1968–1988).
- Dorval Rodrigues, 86, Brazilian footballer (Santos, Paranaense, national team).
- Agustín Saavedra Weise, 78, Bolivian diplomat and writer, president of the Central Bank (2020) and foreign minister (1982).
- Tom Stincic, 75, American football player (Dallas Cowboys, New Orleans Saints).
- Desmond Tutu, 90, South African Anglican prelate and civil rights activist, bishop of Johannesburg (1985–1986) and archbishop of Cape Town (1986–1996), Nobel Prize laureate (1984).
- Manikka Vinayagam, 78, Indian playback singer (Kannathil Muthamittal, Roja Kootam) and actor (Thiruda Thirudi), heart attack.
- Barclay Wade, 77, Australian Olympic rower (1964).
- Sarah Weddington, 76, American attorney (Roe v. Wade) and politician, member of the Texas House of Representatives (1973–1977) and White House political director (1979–1981).
- Grzegorz Więzik, 58, Polish footballer (Łódź, Mulhouse, Viborg).
- Jim Wiley, 71, Canadian ice hockey player (Pittsburgh Penguins, Vancouver Canucks) and coach (San Jose Sharks).
- E. O. Wilson, 92, American biologist (Sociobiology: The New Synthesis) and writer (On Human Nature, Consilience), Pulitzer Prize winner (1979, 1991).

=== 27 ===
- April Ashley, 86, English model, actress (The Road to Hong Kong), and writer.
- Jeanine Baude, 75, French poet and writer.
- Andreas Behm, 59, German weightlifter, Olympic bronze medalist (1992), heart attack.
- Earl Best, 74, American activist and convicted bank robber, cancer.
- Naren Chandra Das, 83, Indian soldier, escorted the 14th Dalai Lama from Tibet in 1959.
- Helen Cooke, 78, American gastroenterologist.
- Defao, 62, Congolese singer-songwriter, COVID-19.
- Patsy Dorgan, 85, Irish footballer (Blackburn Rovers, Cork Hibernians, Cork Celtic F.C.).
- Raymond Fau, 85, French singer-songwriter.
- Carlo Franciosi, 86, Sammarinese politician, Captain Regent (1987).
- Howard Fredeen, 100, Canadian animal breeding researcher.
- Norman Freeman, 90, American Olympic sailor (1976).
- Paul Carter Harrison, 85, American playwright.
- Joynal Hazari, 76, Bangladeshi politician, MP (1991–2001).
- Keri Hulme, 74, New Zealand writer (The Bone People) and poet.
- Arlo Hullinger, 100, American politician, member of the Iowa House of Representatives (1965–1981).
- Fariz Musa, 51, Malaysian politician, COVID-19.
- Peter Pike, 84, British politician, MP (1983–2005).
- Mahendra Prasad, 81, Indian politician, MP (since 1985).
- Robert Preston, 92, American politician, member of the New Hampshire Senate (1964–1966, 1972–1990).
- Jim Sherwin, 81, Irish rugby commentator.
- Graham Skidmore, 90, British voice artist and announcer (Blind Date, Shooting Stars).
- Victor Socaciu, 68, Romanian folk singer, composer and politician, deputy (2008–2012).
- Chemo Soto, 78, Puerto Rican politician, mayor of Canóvanas (1993–2014).
- Akram Toofani, 90–91, Pakistani Islamic scholar. (death announced on this date)
- Raymond Viskanta, 90, Lithuanian engineer.
- Chaim Walder, 53, Israeli rabbi and author, suicide by gunshot.
- Myrna Williams, 92, American politician, member of the Nevada Assembly (1985–1993) and Clark County commissioner (1995–2007).

=== 28 ===
- Kane Hamidou Baba, 67, Mauritanian politician, MP (2006–2013), traffic collision.
- Grichka Bogdanoff, 72, French television presenter and academic fraudster (Bogdanov affair), COVID-19.
- John Bowman, 64, American television writer (Martin, Saturday Night Live, In Living Color).
- Caliadi, 56, Indonesian civil servant, heart and kidney disease.
- James Cayne, 87, American businessman, CEO of Bear Stearns (1993–2008).
- Mikey Chung, 71, Jamaican musician and arranger, myeloma.
- Michael R. Clifford, 69, American astronaut (STS-53, STS-59, STS-76), complications from Parkinson's disease.
- Mary Fairhurst, 64, American jurist, chief justice of the Washington Supreme Court (2017–2020), cancer.
- Ted Gardner, 74, Australian music manager, co-founder of Lollapalooza.
- William Gorham, 91, American economist.
- Luis Guastavino, 89, Chilean politician, intendant of the Valparaíso Region (2003–2006) and deputy (1965–1973).
- Romaine Hart, 88, British film executive.
- Stanislav Huml, 66, Czech police officer and politician, MP (2010–2017).
- Tony Jefferies, 73, British motorcycle road racer.
- James Paul Kocsis, 85, American painter.
- Bill Lyall, 79–80, Canadian politician and businessman, member of the Northern Territory Legislative Assembly (1975–1979).
- John Madden, 85, American Hall of Fame football coach (Oakland Raiders) and sportscaster (NFL on CBS, NFL on Fox), Super Bowl champion (1977).
- Hugo Maradona, 52, Argentine footballer (Rayo Vallecano, Sagan Tosu, Hokkaido Consadole Sapporo), heart attack.
- Jane Maroney, 98, American politician.
- Thomas Milani, 69, Canadian-born Italian ice hockey player (Minnesota Fighting Saints, Kalamazoo Wings, Italy national team).
- Annie Chidzira Muluzi, 69, Malawian first lady (1994–1999), cancer.
- Wojciech Niemiec, 65, Polish footballer (Stal Mielec, Legia Warsaw, Stal Stalowa Wola).
- P. Buford Price, 89, American physicist.
- Harry Reid, 82, American politician, member of the U.S. Senate (1987–2017) and House of Representatives (1983–1987), pancreatic cancer.
- Mike Ruether, 59, American football player (Atlanta Falcons, St. Louis Cardinals, Denver Broncos).
- Michael Schultz, 70, German gallerist.
- Lee Server, 68, American writer.
- Edward Shaske, 94, Canadian Olympic sports shooter (1968).
- Nikolay Shirshov, 47, Uzbek footballer (Pakhtakor Tashkent, Rostov, national team).
- David Sidorsky, 94, American philosopher.
- Mary Alice Thatch, 78, American newspaper editor.
- David Chandler Thomas, 67, American economist and technology executive.
- Tibi, 70, Portuguese footballer (Leixões, Porto, national team).
- Trần Quang Hải, 77, Vietnamese ethnomusicologist.
- Chris Wall, 79, Irish politician, senator (2007).
- Ananda Weerasekara, 78, Sri Lankan military officer and Buddhist monk, commanding officer of the North Central Province.
- Sabine Weiss, 97, Swiss-French photographer.
- Don Whitten, 86, Australian footballer (Footscray, Yarraville).
- Milica Kacin Wohinz, 91, Slovenian historian.
- Stanislav Zavidonov, 87, Russian football player (Zenit Leningrad) and manager (ASM Oran).

=== 29 ===
- Simão Almeida, 77, Brazilian politician, Paraíba MLA (1991–1995), complications from COVID-19.
- Ricardo Bellveser, 73, Spanish writer and journalist, cancer.
- Antoine Bonifaci, 90, French footballer (Nice, Torino, national team).
- Wilbur Wong Yan Choy, 103, American bishop.
- Sue Cline, 75, American politician, member of the West Virginia Senate (2016–2020).
- Kenton Coe, 91, American composer.
- Ahmed Daham, 54, Iraqi football player (Al-Naft, national team) and manager (Naft Maysan), heart attack.
- Lloyd van Dams, 49, Surinamese-born Dutch kickboxer, heart disease.
- Chris Eitzmann, 45, American football player (New England Patriots, Green Bay Packers).
- Mohammed Fareeduddin, 64, Indian politician, Telangana MLC (since 2016), cardiac arrest.
- Nino Filastò, 83, Italian lawyer and writer.
- Bianca Garavelli, 63, Italian writer and literary critic.
- Paolo Giordano, 59, Italian guitarist, COVID-19.
- Ignace Guédé-Gba, 57, Ivorian footballer (Africa Sports, Gazélec Ajaccio, national team).
- Christian Gyan, 43, Ghanaian footballer (Feyenoord, national team), cancer.
- John Hartman, 72, American Hall of Fame drummer (The Doobie Brothers).
- Clemente Iriarte, 75, Spanish footballer (Burgos, Real Oviedo, Osasuna).
- Peter Klatzow, 76, South African composer and pianist.
- Ralph W. Klein, 85, American Biblical scholar (LSTC) and pastor (ELCA).
- Pupetta Maresca, 86, Italian beauty queen, mobster and convicted murderer.
- Lee C. McDonald, 96, American political scientist.
- Alfonso Mejía, 87, Mexican actor (Los Olvidados, Vacations in Acapulco, The Boxer).
- William Moncrief, 101, American petroleum executive.
- Patricia Monk, 83, Canadian academic.
- Kaithapram Viswanathan Namboothiri, 58, Indian film score composer (Kaliyattam, Kannaki, Thilakkam), cancer.
- Steve Peplow, 72, English footballer (Swindon Town, Tranmere Rovers).
- Lluís Raluy, 79, Spanish clown and circus director, complications from Parkinson's disease.
- Nancy Worley, 70, American politician, secretary of state of Alabama (2003–2007).

=== 30 ===
- Howard Berg, 87, American physicist.
- George Brenner, 92, Australian politician, NSW MLC (1981–1991).
- Vladimir Gorikker, 96, Russian film director and screenwriter (Mozart and Salieri, The Tsar's Bride).
- Billy Harrison, 83, New Zealand rugby league player (Wellington, national team).
- Ron Jones, 87, British Olympic sprinter (1964, 1968).
- Sam Jones, 88, American Hall of Fame basketball player (Boston Celtics), ten-time NBA champion.
- Stephen J. Lawrence, 82, American composer (Sesame Street, Bang the Drum Slowly, Alice, Sweet Alice), multiple organ failure.
- Karel Loprais, 72, Czech rally raid driver, six-time winner of the Dakar Rally, COVID-19.
- Lya Luft, 83, Brazilian writer, cancer.
- Peden B. McLeod, 82, American politician.
- Wolfgang Müller, 90, German Olympic equestrian (1968, 1972).
- Bill Noonan, 74, New Zealand rugby league player (Canterbury-Bankstown Bulldogs, Newtown Jets, national team).
- Denis O'Dell, 98, British film producer (The Magic Christian, The Offence, The Ritz).
- Jack Rust, 74, American politician.
- Renato Scarpa, 82, Italian actor (The Postman, Don't Look Now, The Icicle Thief), heart attack.
- Jean Vassieux, 72, French ice hockey player (Ours de Villard-de-Lans, national team).
- Joseph W. Wenzel, 88, American academic, complications from a stroke.

=== 31 ===
- Lauren Adamson, 73, American development psychologist.
- Gaber Asfour, 77, Egyptian academic and politician, minister of culture (2011, 2014–2015).
- Roger Bradfield, 97, American children's author and illustrator.
- Joe Comuzzi, 88, Canadian politician, MP (1988–2008).
- Fred Cone, 95, American football player (Green Bay Packers, Dallas Cowboys), complications from hip surgery.
- Juan Figer, 87, Brazilian-Uruguayan football agent, cardiac arrest.
- Juraj Filas, 66, Slovak composer, complications from COVID-19.
- Christine Grant, 85, Scottish-born American athletic director (University of Iowa).
- Hteik Su Phaya Gyi, 98, Burmese princess.
- Stephen Hartgen, 77, American news editor (Times-News) and politician, member of the Idaho House of Representatives (2008–2018).
- Michael Inwood, 77, British philosopher, lung cancer.
- José de Jesus Filho, 94, Brazilian jurist and politician, member of the Superior Court of Justice (1986–1997), acting minister of justice (1998).
- Gábor Kállai, 62, Hungarian chess grandmaster.
- Elihu Katz, 95, American-born Israeli sociologist and communication scientist.
- Vadim Khamuttskikh, 52, Russian volleyball player, Olympic silver medalist (2000).
- Strong Kobayashi, 81, Japanese professional wrestler (IWE, NJPW) and actor (Choudenshi Bioman), lung disease.
- Valery Kovalyov, 51, Russian businessman and Wikimedian.
- Long Zhiyi, 92, Chinese novelist and politician, chairman of CPPCC Guizhou Committee (1993–1998).
- Csilla Madarász, 78, Hungarian Olympic swimmer (1964, 1968).
- Sara McLanahan, 81, American sociologist, lung cancer.
- Ivan Mozgovenko, 97, Russian clarinetist and music teacher.
- Luigi Negri, 80, Italian Roman Catholic prelate, theologian and academic, bishop of San Marino-Montefeltro (2005–2012) and archbishop of Ferrara-Comacchio (2012–2017).
- Richard Patten, 79, Canadian politician, Ontario MPP (1987–1990, 1995–2007).
- Fred Pickard, 83, American college football player (Florida State Seminoles) and coach (Tennessee-Martin Pacers), complications from Parkinson's disease.
- G. K. Pillai, 97, Indian actor (Kaaryasthan, Cochin Express, Danger Biscuit).
- Gertrude Pressburger, 94, Austrian Holocaust survivor.
- Jeanine Ann Roose, 84, American actress (It's a Wonderful Life), abdominal infection.
- Billy Turner, 81, American horse trainer (Seattle Slew), Triple Crown winner (1977), cancer.
- Betty White, 99, American actress (The Golden Girls, The Mary Tyler Moore Show, Hot in Cleveland) and comedian, five-time Emmy winner, complications from a stroke.
