= Nocoń =

Nocoń is a Polish surname. Notable people with the surname include:

- Adam Nocoń (born 1971), Polish football manager
- Krystyna Gozdawa-Nocoń (1949–2021), Polish politician

== See also ==
- Ladislao Diwa y Nocon (1863–1930), Filipino patriot, one of the founders of the Katipunan
