= Herrgott =

Herrgott is a surname. Notable people with the surname include:

- Élizabeth Herrgott (1941–2021), French writer
- François Joseph Herrgott (1814–1907), French surgeon and obstetrician
- Marquard Herrgott (1694–1762), German Benedictine historian and diplomat

== See also ==
- Hergot
