= Ignacio Martín =

Ignacio Martín may refer to:

- Ignacio Martín (rugby union) (born 1983), Spanish rugby sevens player
- Nacho Martín (basketball) (born 1983), Spanish basketball player
- Nacho Martín (footballer, born 1962), Spanish football player
- Nacho Martín (footballer, born 2002), Spanish football player
- Ignacio Martín (politician), Spanish politician
- Ignacio Martín-Baró, Salvadorian priest
