= Manuel Garza =

Manuel Garza is the name of:

- Manuel Garza Aldape, Mexican attorney
- Manuel Garza González, Mexican politician
- Manuel Garza Rendón, Mexican criminal
- A ring name of Frank Scarpa, American professional wrestler
