= Moszczyński =

Moszczyński is a Polish surname. Notable people with the surname include:

- Emma Moszczynski (born 2001) , German badminton player
- Marek Moszczyński (1949–2021), Polish politician
- Wiktor Andrzej Moszczyński (born 1946), British-Polish journalist, political activist, and author
