= Chung Ung =

South Korean politician (1928–2021)

Member of the National Assembly of South Korea
- In office 30 May 1988 – 29 May 1992
- Preceded by: Shin Ki-ha; Go Gwi-nam
- Succeeded by: Park Gwang-tae; Lee Gil-jae
- Constituency: Buk-gu (Gwangju constituency)

Personal details
- Born: 17 April 1928 Suncheon, Korea, Empire of Japan
- Died: 23 December 2021 (aged 93) Seoul, South Korea
- Party: PDP

Chung Ung (Korean: 정웅; 17 April 1928 – 23 December 2021) was a South Korean politician. A member of the Peace Democratic Party, he served in the National Assembly from 1988 to 1992.

Chung ung died in Seoul on 23 December 2021, at the age of 93.
