= Felice Salis =

Italian field hockey player (1938–2021)

Personal information
- Nationality: Italian
- Born: 8 July 1938 Cagliari, Italy
- Died: 2 December 2021 (aged 83) Cagliari, Italy

Sport
- Sport: Field hockey

Felice Salis (8 July 1938 – 2 December 2021) was an Italian field hockey player. He competed in the men's tournament at the 1960 Summer Olympics. Salis died on 2 December 2021, at the age of 83.
