= Muhammad al-Qudwa =

Palestinian politician (1946–2021)

Governor of the Gaza Governorate
- In office 13 August 1996 – July 2014
- Preceded by: Office established
- Succeeded by: Abdullah Franji

Personal details
- Born: 6 August 1946 Jaffa, Mandatory Palestine
- Died: 16 December 2021 (aged 75) Cairo, Egypt

Muhammad Salem Arafat al-Qudwa (Arabic: محمد القدوة; 6 August 1946 – 16 December 2021) was a Palestinian politician. He served as the first Governor of the Gaza Governorate from 1996 to 2014. Al-Qudwa was an advisor to Yasser Arafat.
