= Ron Page =

Australian rules footballer (1951–2021)

Personal information
- Full name: Ronald Charles Page
- Born: 31 March 1951
- Died: 24 December 2021 (aged 70)
- Original teams: Williamstown Juniors; Williamstown (VFA)
- Height: 183 cm (6 ft 0 in)
- Weight: 91 kg (201 lb)

Playing career^{1}
Years	Club	Games (Goals)
1971	South Melbourne	3 (1)
- Williamstown (VFA) 1968-70

Coaching career
Years	Club	Games (W–L–D)
1982 Williamstown United	1982 Williamstown United	
- ^{1} Playing statistics correct to the end of 1971.

Career highlights
- 1969 Williamstown Second Division premiership

Ronald Charles Page (31 March 1951 – 24 December 2021) was an Australian rules footballer who played with South Melbourne in the Victorian Football League (VFL).
