= Vicente de la Fuente García =

Spanish politician (1934–2021)

Mayor of Betanzos
- In office 1979–1983
- Preceded by: Ramón Sánchez García
- Succeeded by: Antolín Sánchez

Personal details
- Born: 29 January 1934; Betanzos, Spain
- Died: 22 December 2021 (aged 87)
- Political party: UCD

Vicente de la Fuente García (29 January 1934 – 22 December 2021) was a Spanish politician. A member of the Union of the Democratic Centre, he served as Mayor of Betanzos from 1979 to 1983. He died on 22 December 2021, at the age of 87. He was the first Mayor elected in Betanzos after the fall of Francoist Spain.

== Mayorship ==
As mayor of Betanzos, de la Fuente worked to bring back transparency that was lacking during the Francoist era. This included recovering municipal archival documents and opening a municipal archive. In addition, he revived Anuario Brigantino after a 30-year pause in publication. The publication, which is a university-level research journal, has since been archived at the Library of Congress.

== Personal life ==
Vincente de la Fuente had 9 children.

== Legacy ==
The mayor of Betanzos at the time of his death, María Barral, has proposed to rename the Santo Domino cultural building to Centro Cultural Vincente de la Fuente.
