= Go Gwi-nam =

South Korean politician (1933–2022)

Member of the National Assembly of South Korean
- In office 23 December 1972 – 29 May 1988

Personal details
- Born: 6 September 1933 Gangjin County, Korea, Empire of Japan
- Died: 15 May 2022 (aged 88)
- Party: DJP
- Education: Chonnam National University

Go Gwi-nam (Korean: 고귀남; 6 September 1933 – 15 May 2022) was a South Korean politician. As a member of the Democratic Justice Party, he served in the National Assembly from 1972 to 1988. He died on 15 May 2022 at the age of 88.
