= Vladimir Gorikker =

Soviet film director (1925–2021)

Vladimir Mikhailovich Gorikker
- Born: 2 November 1925
- Died: 30 December 2021 (aged 96)
- Occupation: Film director

Vladimir Mikhailovich Gorikker (Russian: Влади́мир Миха́йлович Го́риккер; 2 November 1925 – 30 December 2021) was a Russian film director and screenwriter. He died on 30 December 2021, at the age of 96.
