= Ryszard Brzuzy =

Polish politician and trade unionist (1961–2021)

Member of the Sejm
- In office 18 June 1989 – 25 November 1991

Personal details
- Born: 2 January 1961 Bogatynia, Poland
- Died: 9 December 2021 (aged 60) Bełchatów, Poland
- Party: KO "S"

Ryszard Brzuzy (2 January 1961 – 9 December 2021) was a Polish trade unionist and politician. A member of the Solidarity Citizens' Committee, he served in the Sejm from 1989 to 1991.
