= Michel Quarez =

French painter and poster artist (1938–2021)

- Born: 28 May 1938; Damascus, Syria, France
- Died: 8 December 2021 (aged 83)
- Occupations: Painter; Poster artist

Michel Quarez (28 May 1938 – 8 December 2021) was a French painter and poster artist.

== Biography ==
Quarez studied at the École des beaux-arts de Bordeaux and at the École nationale supérieure des arts décoratifs, where he graduated in 1961. He also studied in Warsaw under Henryk Tomaszewski. In 1967, he illustrated Mod Love, a comic book written by Michael Lutin. In 2011, musician Alex Gimeno used these images for his album Mondo Beyondo. In 1968, Quarez illustrated another comic strip, La Vita Privata di Dyane.

Following in Quarez's footsteps, Pierre Bernard and Gérard Paris-Clavel studied in Warsaw and later co-founded Grapus together. Quarez joined the organization, but his differences with the group caused him to leave after three years. His works were characterized by large, colorful shapes. His works have been exhibited in Saint-Denis, Chaumont, the Bibliothèque Forney, the Stedelijk Museum Amsterdam, and others.

Michel Quarez died on 8 December 2021 at the age of 83.
