= Lee C. McDonald =

American political scientist (1925–2021)

Lee Cameron McDonald (February 22, 1925 – December 29, 2021) was an American political scientist. He taught at Pomona College in Claremont, California from 1952 to 1990, and was the dean of the college from 1970 to 1975. He authored the textbook Western Political Theory. He and his wife, Claire, were married for 75 years and raised five children.
