= Lluís Raluy =

Spanish clown (1942–2021)

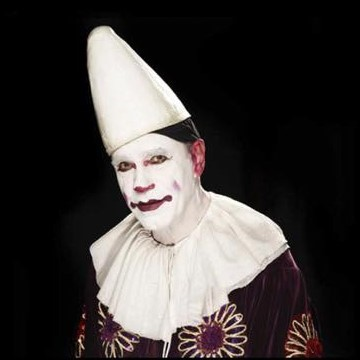
- Born: 25 February 1942; Sant Adrià de Besòs, Spain
- Died: 29 December 2021 (aged 79); Valencia, Spain
- Occupation: Clown

Lluís Raluy i Tomàs (25 February 1942 – 29 December 2021) was a Spanish clown and circus director. He died from complications of Parkinson's disease on 29 December 2021, at the age of 79. He was the son of Lluís Raluy Iglesias and Marina Tomàs Jorba, a family of circus artists from Catalonia. In 1984, together with his brother Carles Raluy, he took over the Ringland Circus, belonging to the family, while his other brothers Francis and Eduard founded the Williams Circus, based in Mallorca. Between 1984 and 1992, Ringland toured the Caribbean and the West Indies and returned to Catalonia in 1992 to perform, as a Circus Raluy, in Vilanova i la Geltrú on the occasion of the Special Olympics.
