= Ramón Regueira =

Spanish footballer (1935–2021)

Personal information
- Full name: Ramón Regueira Ramos
- Date of birth: January 1935
- Place of birth: A Coruña, Spain
- Date of death: 15 December 2021 (aged 86)
- Position: Forward

Youth career
- Xesuítas de Vigo
- 1950–1952: Deportivo Fabril

Senior career*
Years	Team	Apps	(Gls)
1952–1956	Deportivo de La Coruña	0	(0)
1953–1954	→ Caudal (loan)	7	(0)
1954–1955	→ Caudal (loan)	20	(6)
1956–1957	Burgos	11	(4)
Total		38	(10)
- * Club domestic league appearances and goals

Ramón Regueira Ramos (7 January 1935 – 15 December 2021) was a Spanish professional footballer who played as a forward.

== Career ==
Born in A Coruña, Regueira played for Xesuítas de Vigo, Deportivo Fabril, Deportivo de La Coruña, Caudal and Burgos. His football career ended when he was called up for military service, and he later became a businessman.
