= Muhammad Yusuf Islahi =

Indian writer (1932–2021)

Mohammad Yusuf Islahi
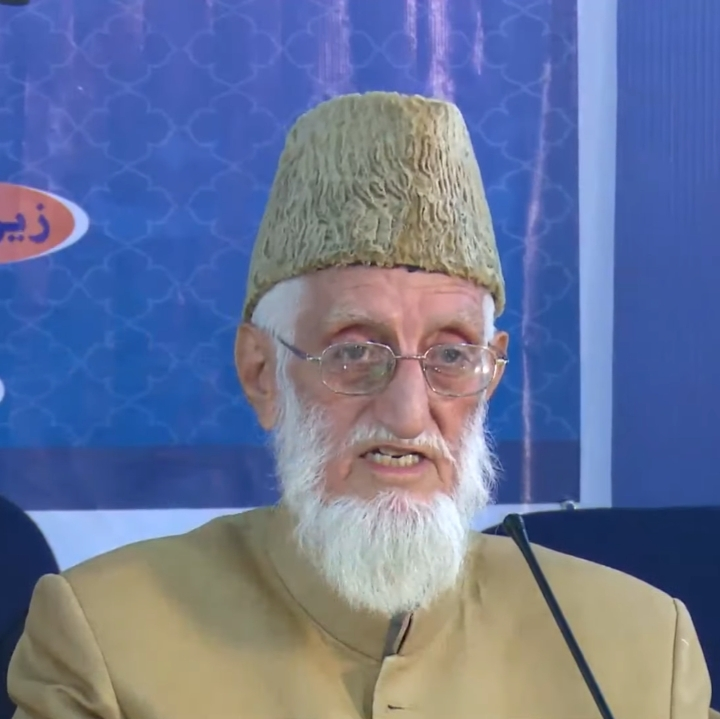
- Islahi in June 2020
- Native name: محمد یوسف اصلاحی
- Born: 9 July 1932 British India
- Died: 21 December 2021 (aged 89) Rampur, India
- Occupation: Scholar, writer
- Language: Urdu
- Notable works: Adaab-e-zindagi

Muhammad Yusuf Islahi (9 July 1932 – 21 December 2021) was an Indian Islamic scholar and writer.

Islahi was born in Attock, British India, on 9 July 1932. His early education took place in Bareilly, including Hifz-e-Qur'an and Tajweed, before he attended high school at Islamia Inter College, in Bareilly. He then enrolled in Mazahirul Uloom Saharanpur, and studied for several years, before entering Madrasat-ul-Islah. He died on 21 December 2021, at the age of 89 in rampur UP.
