= Rusmono =

Indonesian military doctor (1943–2021)

Inspector General of the Department of Health
- In office 28 July 1992 – 10 April 2000
- President: Suharto; B. J. Habibie; Abdurrahman Wahid
- Preceded by: Mohammad Isa
- Succeeded by: Dadi Sugandi Argadiredja

Personal details
- Born: 10 September 1943 Pemalang, Central Java, Japanese occupation of the Dutch East Indies
- Died: 16 December 2021 (aged 78) Jakarta, Indonesia

Military service
- Allegiance: Indonesia
- Branch/service: Indonesian Army
- Years of service: 1968–1999
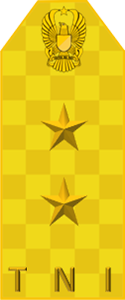
- Rank: Major general
- Unit: Health (CKM)

Rusmono (10 September 1943 – 16 December 2021) was an Indonesian military doctor. He was Suharto's personal doctor from 1983 until 1992. Afterward, Rusmono was assigned to a high-ranking post in the Department of Health, serving as Inspector General from 1992 until 2000 and as an expert staff from 2000 until 2003. Rusmono died at the age of 78 on 16 December 2021.

== Education and military career ==
Rusmono was born in Pemalang, Central Java, during the Japanese occupation of the Dutch East Indies. Rusmono attended the Medical Faculty of the University of Indonesia after finishing high school and graduated in 1968. He entered military service and became a second lieutenant of the medical corps shortly thereafter. He was deployed as a medic to East Timor during the Indonesian invasion of East Timor in 1975.

Seven years later, in 1982, Rusmono pursued undergraduate studies at the University of Indonesia. He was then assigned as a regular medical officer at the army headquarters. Aside from being an army doctor, Rusmono also ran a clinic alongside his wife.

== Suharto's personal doctor ==
On 17 February 1983, Rusmono, who was a lieutenant colonel, was summoned by Suharto to his house. After asking him about his daily life and activities, Suharto informed him of his new assignment as his personal doctor. Rusmono became Suharto's personal doctor for about nine years.

During this period, Rusmono was promoted several times until he reached the rank of brigadier general. Rusmono also became a part of Suharto's inner circle and was entrusted with key positions within the Harapan Kita Foundation, a foundation owned by Suharto's wife Tien Suharto.

As Suharto's personal doctor, Rusmono had to accompany him whenever he sought treatment for medical reasons. Rusmono stated that Suharto "has a firm sense of nationalism", stating that he always refused to be treated overseas and always had his medical checkups at the Gatot Soebroto Army Hospital.

Aside from being tasked to oversee Suharto's health, Rusmono also archived Suharto and his wife's correspondence. Following Suharto's downfall and death, Rusmono compiled these letters and published them as a book titled A Series of Dispositions of President Soeharto & First Lady. The book, which was supplemented with commentaries from biographer Donna Sita Indria, was released in 2018.

== In the Department of Health ==
In early 1992, Rusmono was offered a job by Minister of Health, Adhiyatma, as an inspector general. The previous officeholder had died in office and the post was vacant for a considerable period of time. Rusmono accepted this offer and was installed as inspector general on 28 July 1992. In connection with his appointment, Rusmono was promoted to the rank of major general on 1 April 1994.

During his tenure as inspector general, he uncovered various financial leakages in the department that resulted in a total loss of up to three billion rupiahs. Most of the leakages were found in the Directorate General for Medical Services.

He was replaced on 10 April 2000 and continued to work in the department as an expert staff advisor to the minister until his retirement as a civil servant in 2003.

== Death ==
After his retirement, Rusmono continued to manage Suharto's foundations: the Harapan Kita Foundation and the Dana Abadi Karya Bakti Foundation.

Rusmono died on 16 December 2021 in Jakarta, Indonesia, three months after his 78th birthday. He was buried a day later at a cemetery in Bambu Apus, South Jakarta.
