= Bernie Jeffrey =

Australian rules footballer (1933–2021)

Personal information
- Full name: Bernie Jeffrey
- Born: 3 September 1933
- Died: 1 December 2021 (aged 88); Brisbane, Queensland
- Original team: Flinders Naval Base
- Height: 191 cm (6 ft 3 in)
- Weight: 96 kg (212 lb)

Playing career^{1}
Years	Club	Games (Goals)
1956	South Melbourne	4 (7)
- ^{1} Playing statistics correct to the end of 1956.

Bernie Jeffrey (3 September 1933 – 1 December 2021) was an Australian rules footballer who played for the South Melbourne Football Club in the Victorian Football League (VFL).
