= Xavier Ziani =

French volleyball player (1972–2021)

Personal information
- Nationality: French
- Born: 25 October 1972 Saint-Maurice, France
- Died: 4 December 2021 (aged 49)
- Height: 1.97 m (6 ft 6 in)

Coaching information
- Previous teams coached
- Years: Teams
- 2015–2021: CNM Charenton

Volleyball information
- Position: Middle blocker

Career
- Years: Team
- 1999–2000: Asnières Volley 92
- 2002–2003: Tourcoing Lille Métropole Volley-Ball
- 2003–2004: Paris Volley
- 2004–2005: REC Volley
- 2006–2014: CNM Charenton

National team
- Years: Team
- –: France

Xavier Ziani (25 October 1972 – 4 December 2021) was a French professional volleyball player. He played as a middle blocker.

== Awards ==
- Pro A Final Four with Tourcoing Lille Métropole Volley-Ball (2003)
- Winner of the Coupe de France Volley with Paris Volley (2004)
- Champion of Pro A with Paris Volley (2006)
- 3rd Place in the 2006 Champions League with Paris Volley (2006)
