= Stéphane Bonduel =

French politician (1919–2021)

Member of the French Senate
- In office 28 September 1980 – 1 October 1989
- Constituency: Charente-Maritime

Personal details
- Born: 30 November 1919 Beijing, China
- Died: 16 December 2021 (aged 102) Tonnay-Boutonne, France
- Party: RDSE

Stéphane Bonduel (30 November 1919 – 16 December 2021) was a French politician. A member of the European Democratic and Social Rally group, he served in the Senate from 1980 to 1989. He died on 16 December 2021, at the age of 102.
