= Hans Gerhard Ramler =

German trade unionist and politician (1928–2021)

Member of the Landtag of Schleswig-Holstein
- In office 1971–1987

Personal details
- Born: 13 July 1928 Kiel, Germany
- Died: 11 December 2021 (aged 93) Sierksdorf, Germany
- Party: SPD

Hans Gerhard Ramler (13 July 1928 – 11 December 2021) was a German politician. A member of the Social Democratic Party of Germany, he served in the Landtag of Schleswig-Holstein from 1971 to 1987. He died on 11 December 2021, at the age of 93.
