= Juan Carlos Oyarzún =

Argentine politician (1951–2021)

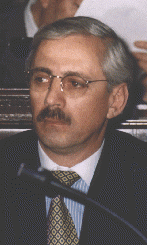
- Oyarzún in 1997

National Senator
- In office 26 February 1992 – 9 December 1998
- Constituency: Tierra del Fuego

Personal details
- Born: 6 June 1951 Ushuaia, Argentina
- Died: 11 December 2021 (aged 70) Ushuaia, Argentina
- Party: MOPOF

Juan Carlos Oyarzún (6 June 1951 – 11 December 2021) was an Argentine politician. As a member of the Fueguian People's Movement, he served in the Argentine Senate from 1992 to 1998.
