= Kurt Edler =

German politician (1950–2021)

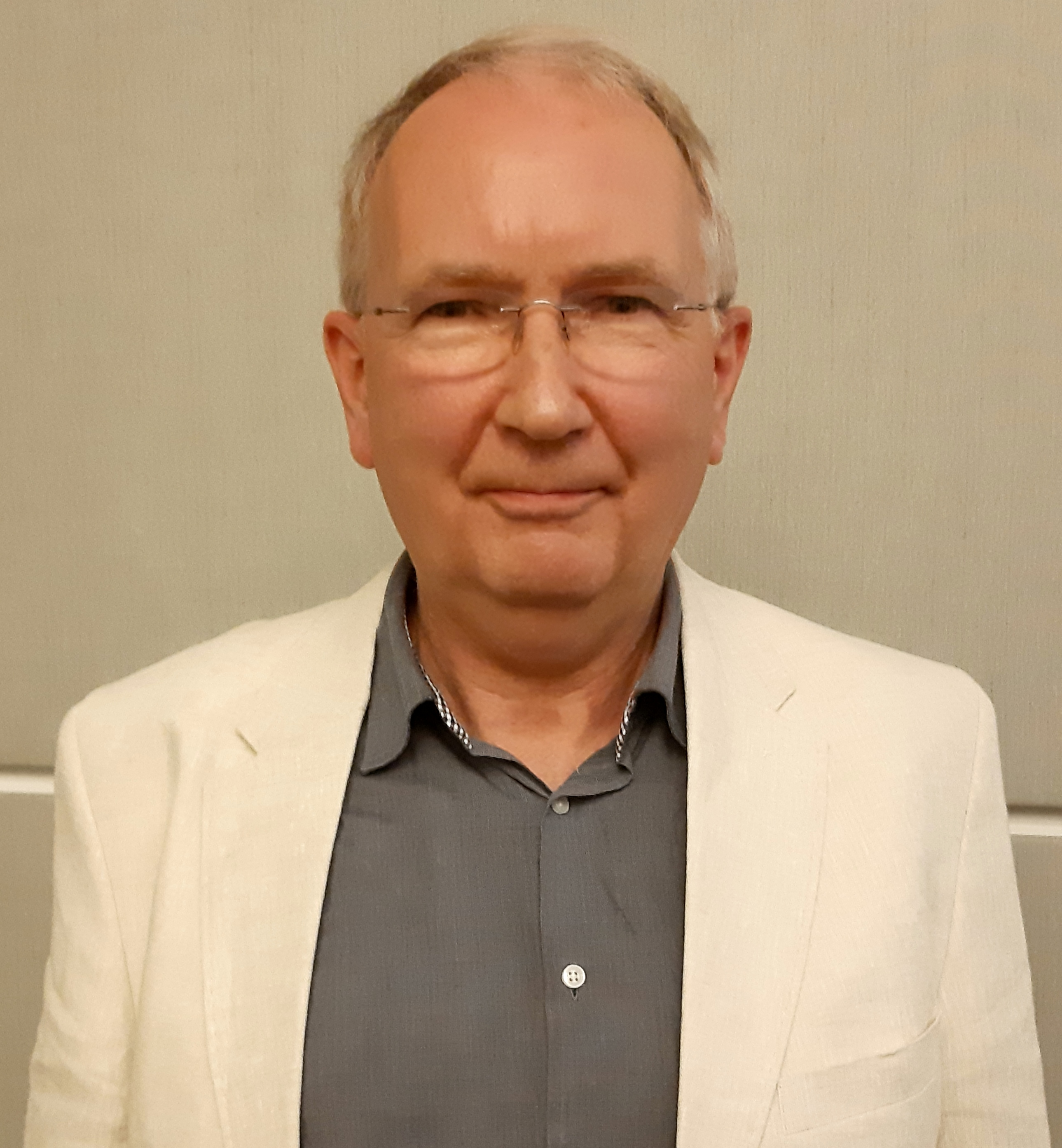
- Edler in 2019

Member of the Hamburg Parliament
- In office 1993–1997
- In office 1985–1986

Personal details
- Born: 10 April 1950; Oldenburg, West Germany
- Died: December 2021 (aged 71)
- Political party: GAL

Kurt Edler (10 April 1950 – December 2021) was a German politician. A member of the Green Alternative List, he served in the Hamburg Parliament from 1985 to 1986 and again from 1993 to 1997. He died in December 2021, at the age of 71.
