= Eugeniusz Czepiel =

Polish beekeeper and politician (1929–2021)

Member of the Sejm
- In office 24 September 1981 – 31 August 1985

Personal details
- Born: 15 August 1929 Łopuszka Wielka, Poland
- Died: 23 December 2021 (aged 92)
- Party: PZPR

Eugeniusz Czepiel (15 August 1929 – 23 December 2021) was a Polish beekeeper and politician. A member of the Polish United Workers' Party (PZPR), he sat in the Sejm from 1981 to 1985. He died on 23 December 2021, at the age of 92.
