= Vasily Michurin =

Belarusian colonel (1916–2021)

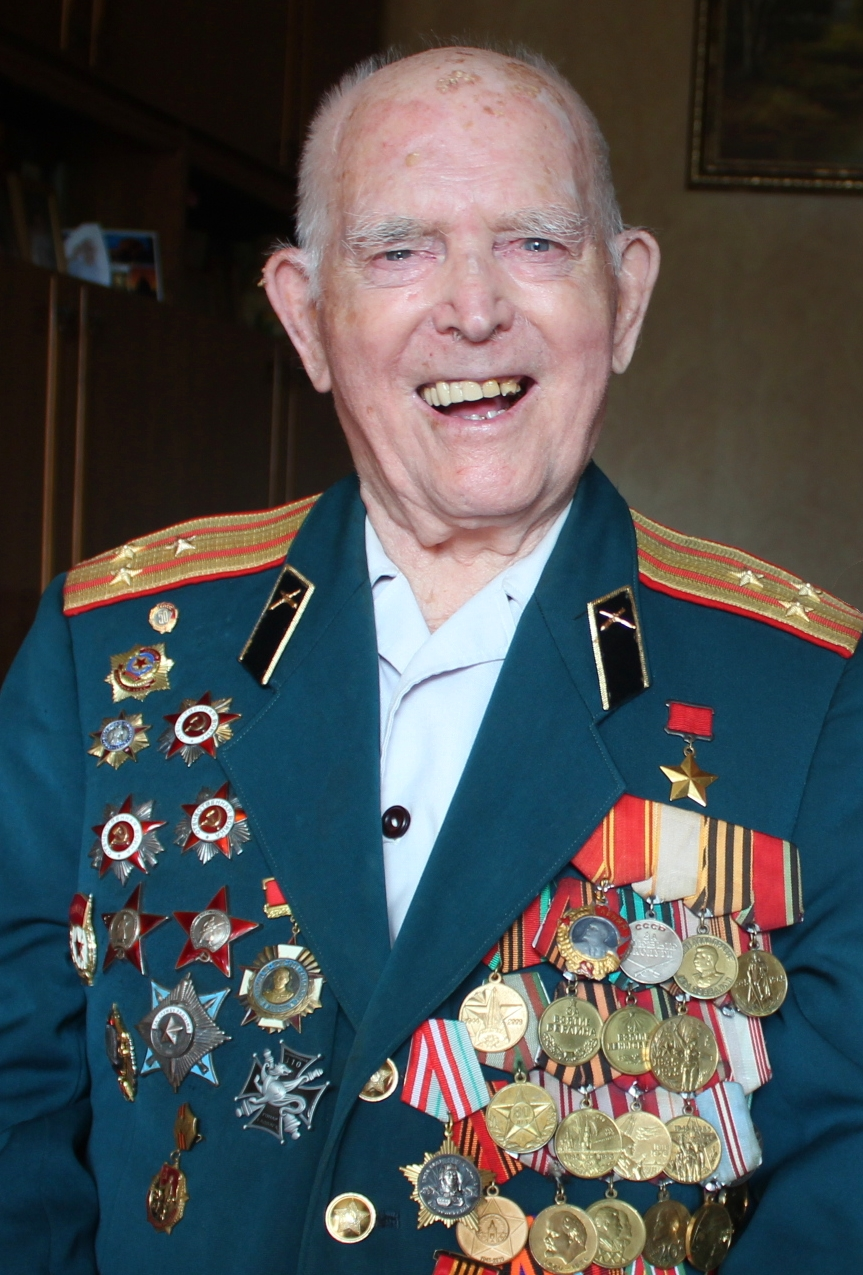
- Born: Vasily Sergeyevich Michurin; 15 July 1916; Kuzmino, Kostroma Governorate, Russian Empire
- Died: 16 December 2021 (aged 105); Minsk, Belarus
- Military career
- Allegiance: Soviet Union
- Branch: Red Army; Soviet Army
- Service years: 1939–73
- Rank: Colonel
- Unit: 13th Army
- Conflicts: World War II
- Awards: Hero of the Soviet Union; Order of Lenin; Order of the Red Banner; Order of the Patriotic War

Vasily Sergeyevich Michurin (Russian: Васи́лий Серге́евич Мичу́рин; 15 July 1916 – 16 December 2021) was a Red Army man of the 13th Army and later a colonel in the Soviet Army. He was the last of the surviving Hero of the Soviet Union to receive this title for the Winter War and before the start of the Great Patriotic War.
