= Mava Chou =

Swiss influencer (1989–2021)

- Born: Maëva Frossard; 11 December 1989
- Died: 22 December 2021 (aged 32)
- Occupation: YouTuber
- Years active: 2015–2021

Mava Chou (née Frossard, 11 December 1989 – 22 December 2021) was a Swiss YouTuber.

== Life and career ==
Originally from Geneva, Chou was born as Maëva Frossard on 11 December 1989. She was married to Adrien Czajczynski, with whom she had four children. The couple lived in Batilly, Meurthe-et-Moselle, where they created a marketing and information business.

Chou joined YouTube in 2013 and was active on several social media platforms by 2015. In 2018, she surpassed 100,000 followers on her YouTube channel, which she initially titled Mavachou, une maman sans tabou. She also gained popularity thanks to an appearance on the reality show On a échangé nos mamans, aired on TFX in 2017. At the time of her death, she had approximately 151,000 subscribers on YouTube, 90,000 followers on Instagram, and 38,000 followers on Facebook.

In 2018, Chou and Czajcysnki founded a charity, Pour une petite Souris, which provided aid to orphanages, after learning about the lack of funds to an orphanage in Ukraine. In 2019, internet users accused the couple of embezzling the charity's funds which were intended to benefit the foundation. In January of that year, the two filed for divorce, but remained in the same household with their children until early 2020. In May 2020, she settled in Vosges with a new spouse during a custody battle over her and Czajcynski's children. In February 2021, she announced that she had filed several complaints for identity theft, cyberstalking, and sexually-explicit comments made about her and her oldest daughter on Twitter. The following month, Le Parisien published a report on the "campaign of harassment" against her and her family. Among these acts included anonymous phone calls to her children's school and photographs taken of her home. She subsequently stepped back from her online presence.

Chou died on 22 December 2021, eleven days after her 32nd birthday. Her death was announced by a friend on Facebook who asked for respect to her family. Her death provoked many reactions in the media regarding her harassment on social networks. Her lawyer, Stéphane Giuranna, revealed that many complaints had been filed by her and her second husband against Czajczynski since May 2020. Her last complaints against him, for mobbing and advocacy of suicide, were filed on the day of her death, none of which were successful. According to her lawyer, these deaths were a "modern-day homicide". Influencer Jeremstar alleged that Chou was harassed since her rise to fame in 2015 and that the slow reaction from authorities was partially to blame for her death. Another influencer, Emma CakeCup, stated that "harassment kills".

Adrien Czajczynski spoke publicly four days after her death, denouncing the harassment against his ex-wife, of which he alleged he was also a victim. He refuted all accusations of harassment on his part.
