= Manolo Jiménez (footballer, born 1941) =

Spanish footballer (1941–2021)

Personal information
- Full name: Manuel Jímenez Rodríguez
- Date of birth: 14 December 1941
- Place of birth: Seville, Spain
- Date of death: 5 December 2021 (aged 79)
- Place of death: Vigo, Spain
- Height: 1.79 m (5 ft 10 in)
- Position: Forward

Youth career
- CD Rocío
- San Vicente

Senior career*
Years	Team	Apps	(Gls)
1958–1963	Triana Balompié		
1959–1960	→ Mérida		
1961–1962	→ Ayamonte		
1962–1963	→ El Cano Algeciras		
1963–1966	Betis Sevilla		
1964–1965	→ Constància	14	(4)
1965–1966	→ Xerez		
1966–1967	Badajoz		
1967–1969	Barcelona	0	(0)
1968–1969	→ Celta de Vigo	20	(10)
1969–1975	Celta de Vigo	152	(36)
1976	Girona		

Managerial career
- Celta de Vigo
- Tyde FC Tui
- Selección Comarcal Vigo
- CD Miño A Guarda
- * Club domestic league appearances and goals

Manolo Jiménez Rodríguez (14 December 1941 – 5 December 2021) was a Spanish footballer who played as a forward.

== Biography ==
Jiménez began his career with Triana Balompié. Before he could start for the Triana first team, he was recruited by CD Badajoz, and played two good seasons in the Segunda División. He was then recruited by FC Barcelona, where he remained for two and a half seasons without playing a single game. He was loaned to Celta de Vigo and subsequently transferred to the club, taking part in the inaugural UEFA Cup. He retired from playing in 1975.

He died in Vigo on 5 December 2021, at the age of 79.
