= Aleksandr Neumyvakin =

Russian politician (1940–2021)

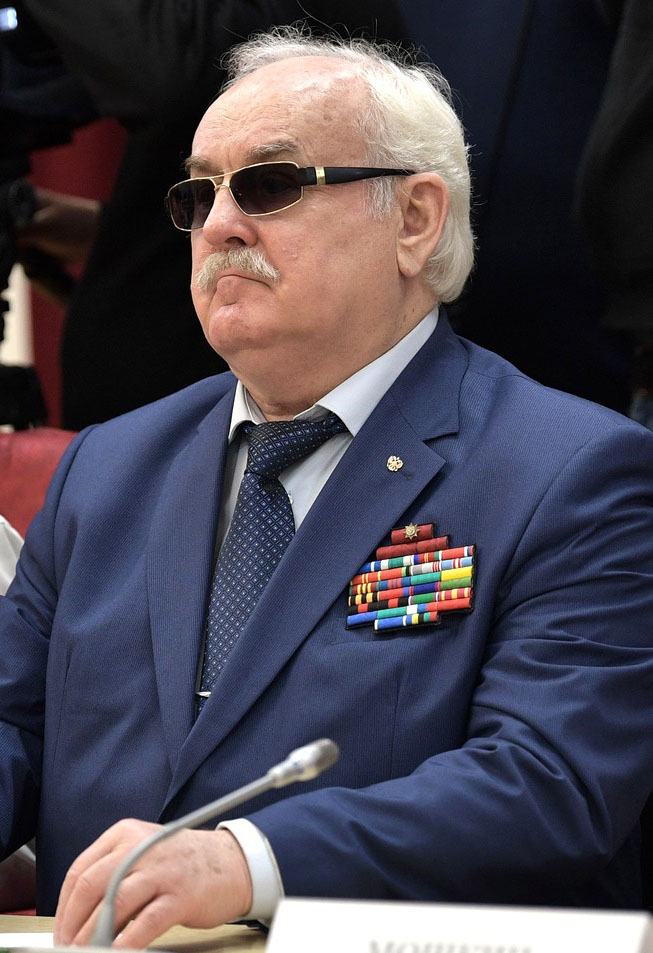
- Neumyvakin in 2017

Member of the Congress of People's Deputies of the Soviet Union
- In office 1989–1991

Personal details
- Born: 1 May 1940 Liski, Russian SFSR, Soviet Union
- Died: 9 December 2021 (aged 81) Moscow, Russia
- Party: CPSU

Aleksandr Yakovlevich Neumyvakin (Russian: Александр Яковлевич Неумывакин; 1 May 1940 – 9 December 2021) was a Russian politician. A member of the Communist Party, he served on the Congress of People's Deputies of the Soviet Union from 1989 to 1991 and as President of the Russian Paralympic Committee (1991—1997).
