= Raymond Fau =

French singer-songwriter and photographer (1936–2021)

- Born: 16 August 1936; Graulhet, France
- Died: 27 December 2021 (aged 85)
- Occupations: Singer-songwriter; Photographer

Raymond Fau (16 August 1936 – 27 December 2021) was a French singer-songwriter and photographer. He primarily sang liturgical music.

== Life and career ==
Fau was born in Graulhet on 16 August 1936. At the age of 18, Fau briefly lived in Ubangi-Shari, which became a turning point in his life. He became a national leader in the Scouts de France in 1963 and held a close relationship with the international Scouting community.

For thirty years, Fau composed many sung prayers and liturgical songs, such as Tu es là, au cœur de nos vies. In particular, he worked with Gaëtan de Courrèges and Jean Debruynne. Later in his life, he turned to photography, specializing in portraits. His images illustrated two works by Jean Debruynne. On 15 June 1996, Fau retired from singing. He continued practicing photography in his hometown of Graulhet.

Fau died on 27 December 2021, at the age of 85.

== Discography ==
- La vie c’est comme ça
- Douze petits Noëls
- Combien de temps (1970)
- Je mets ma main dans ta main (1972)
- Tu es là au cœur de nos vies (1973)
- 25 ans de prières chantées (1989)
- Chanter Marie (1992)
- Huit messes simples (1994)
- À Dieu (1996)

== Photographic works ==
- Les Voyageurs de Dieu (1987)
- Rencontres et Regards (1991)

== Exhibitions ==
- Moines et Moinillons du Myanmar at the Tour des Rondes (Lavaur, 2011)
- Printemps de Photographes, (Graulhet, 2016)
