= Nino Filastò =

Italian lawyer and writer (1938–2021)

- Born: 23 January 1938; Florence, Italy
- Died: 29 December 2021 (aged 83); Florence, Italy
- Occupations: Lawyer; Writer

Nino Filastò (23 January 1938 – 29 December 2021) was an Italian lawyer and writer. He was known for defending multiple militants of the far-left in the 1980s. He also wrote on significant events in 20th-century Italy, such as the Murder of Ermanno Lavorini, the Italicus Express bombing, and disaster of the Moby Prince.

== Life and career ==
Filastò was born in Florence on 23 January 1938, where he spent the entirety of his working life. In addition to his law career, he wrote essays on the Monster of Florence and several novels. He had worked as the defender of exponents of the extreme left in the 1980s. Filastò died on 29 December 2021, at the age of 83.

== Works ==
=== Novels and short stories ===
- La proposta (1984)
- La tana dell'oste (1986)
- Tre giorni nella vita dell'avvocato Scalzi (1989)
- Incubo di signora (1990)
- La moglie egiziana (1995)
- La notte delle rose nere (1997)
- Forza maggiore (2002)
- Il peposo di Maestro Filippo (2003)
- Aringa rossa (2004)
- L'alfabeto di Eden (2007)

=== Collections ===
- Fuga da Eden (1993)

=== Essays ===
- Pacciani innocente (1994)
- Storia delle merende infami (2005)

== Awards ==
- Premio Tedeschi (1986)
