= Víctor Moro =

Spanish politician (1926–2021)

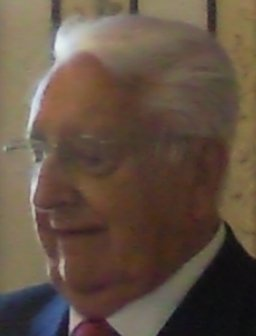
Moro in 2012

Víctor Moro Rodríguez (25 April 1926 – 15 December 2021) was a Spanish politician who served as a member of the Congress of Deputies from 1977 to 1979. Moro died on 15 December 2021, at the age of 95.
