= Ivan Shilov =

Soviet-Russian politician (1930–2021)

Deputy Minister of Internal Affairs
- In office 1988–1991

Personal details
- Born: 3 September 1930 Sosnovy Ostrog, Yashkinsky District, Kemerovo Oblast, Russian SFSR, Soviet Union
- Died: 22 December 2021 (aged 91) Moscow, Russia
- Party: CPSU

Ivan Shilov (Russian: Иван Фёдорович Шилов; 3 September 1930 – 22 December 2021) was a Soviet-Russian politician. A member of the Communist Party, he served as Deputy Minister of Internal Affairs from 1988 to 1991. Shilov died on 22 December 2021, at the age of 91.
