= Tilman Pünder =

German politician (1932–2021)

Regierungspräsident of Giessen
- In office 1987–1989
- Preceded by: Knut Müller
- Succeeded by: Alois Rhiel

Senior City Manager of Münster
- In office 1989–1997
- Preceded by: Hermann Fechtrup
- Succeeded by: position abolished

Personal details
- Born: 27 December 1932 Münster, Westphalia, Prussia, Germany
- Died: 18 December 2021 (aged 88)
- Party: CDU

Tilman Pünder (27 December 1932 – 18 December 2021) was a German politician. A member of the Christian Democratic Union of Germany, he served as Regierungspräsident of Giessen from 1987 to 1989 and Senior City Manager of Münster from 1989 to 1997. He died on 18 December 2021, at the age of 88.
