= Falco Accame =

Italian politician (1925–2021)

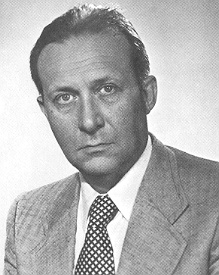
- Accame in 1979

Member of the Chamber of Deputies of Italy
- In office 5 July 1976 – 11 July 1983
- Constituency: Genoa

Personal details
- Born: 17 April 1925 Florence, Italy
- Died: 13 December 2021 (aged 96) Rome, Italy
- Party: PSI

Falco Accame (17 April 1925 – 13 December 2021) was an Italian politician. A member of the Italian Socialist Party, he served in the Chamber of Deputies from 5 July 1976 to 11 July 1983.

== Biography ==
He was a senior Italian Navy officer and commander of the Destroyer Indomito until July 1975.

He was elected to the Chamber of Deputies first in 1976 and then again in 1979 as a member of the Italian Socialist Party.

He was President and Vice-President of the Defense Committee and a member of the Parliamentary Committee of Inquiry into military procurement.

He served as a councilor for the Liguria Region and the Municipality of Rome and was a National Councilor for Legambiente.

As President of the N. Pasti International Peace Foundation, he represented the “R. Clark Tribunal for NATO war crimes in the former Yugoslavia” in Italy.

He was president of Ana-Vafaf, an association that protects the families of military personnel who died in peacetime. With this association, he dealt, among other things, with the consequences that the use of weapons containing depleted uranium had on Italian soldiers in missions in Lebanon, Iraq, Bosnia and Herzegovina, Somalia, and Kosovo.

He was also honorary president of the Center for Truth and Justice Initiatives (CIVG), vice president of the Seagull Committee for Maritime Safety, and a member of the Committee for the Defense and Revival of the Constitution.
