= Mustapha El Karouni =

Belgian politician (1968–2021)

Member of the Parliament of the Brussels-Capital Region
- In office 29 June 2007 – 7 June 2009
- Preceded by: Jacques Simonet

Personal details
- Born: 7 August 1968 Ougrée, Belgium
- Died: 8 December 2021 (aged 53)
- Party: MR

Mustapha El Karouni (7 August 1968 – 8 December 2021) was a Belgian politician of the Reformist Movement. He served as a lawyer within the Brussels Bar after graduating with a law degree from the University of Liège. He earned a doctorate from Paris 1 Panthéon-Sorbonne University in 2003.

From 29 June 2007 to 7 June 2009, he served in the Parliament of the Brussels-Capital Region, finishing the term of the late Jacques Simonet.
