= Ganeshwar Kusum =

Indian politician (1934–2021)

Member of Parliament, Rajya Sabha
- In office 1984–1990
- Constituency: Odisha

Personal details
- Born: 21 March 1934
- Died: 24 December 2021 (aged 87)
- Party: Indian National Congress
- Spouse: Jasada Kusum

Ganeshwar Kusum (21 March 1934 – 24 December 2021) was an Indian politician.

He was a Member of Parliament, representing Odisha in the Rajya Sabha, the upper house of India's Parliament, as a member of the Indian National Congress. Kusum died on 24 December 2021, at the age of 87.
