= Suzette Winter =

American filmmaker (1931–2021)

- Born: Suzette St. John Winter; January 19, 1931; London, England
- Died: December 1, 2021; Sleepy Hollow, New York
- Occupation: Filmmaker

Suzette Winter (January 19, 1931 – December 1, 2021) was a British-born American filmmaker. She wrote and produced a series of over 30 documentaries about noted Hollywood film stars. The documentaries use a mixture of archival footage and interviews.

== Biography ==
Suzette St. John Winter was born in London on January 19, 1931, to Ralph and Marguerite Winter. During World War II, Winter and her siblings were evacuated during the Blitz. In 1973, she earned a bachelor’s degree in English literature from Mercy College and in 1976 a masters from Manhattanville College. Winter first film, Danny, was released in 1977. In 1982, she and her husband started the Hollywood series with Hollywood Children, a film about the history of child actors.

In 1994, her film Audrey Hepburn Remembered was nominated for an Emmy Award. Winter died on December 1, 2021, of aspiration pneumonia at the age of 90.

== Personal life ==
In 1952, Winter married Leo Grimpel. The couple had two daughters, later divorcing in 1966. In 1967, she married Gene Feldman, with whom she later worked professionally.

== Filmography ==
- 1999 Alan Ladd: The True Quiet Man (TV Movie documentary) 1999
- 1998 Gary Cooper: The Face of a Hero (Documentary)
- 1996 Fred MacMurray: The Guy Next Door (TV Movie)
- 1996 Jack Lemmon: America's Everyman (TV Movie documentary)
- 1996 Joan Crawford: Always the Star (TV Movie documentary)
- 1996 Shirley MacLaine: Kicking Up Her Heels (Video documentary)
- 1995 Yul Brynner: The Man Who Was King (TV Movie documentary)
- 1994 The Story of Lassie (TV Movie documentary)
- 1994 Mae West and the Men Who Knew Her (TV Movie documentary)
- 1994 Michael Caine: Breaking the Mold (TV Movie documentary)
- 1993 Shirley Temple: America's Little Darling (TV Movie) (writer)
- 1993 Audrey Hepburn Remembered (TV Movie documentary)
- 1991 Robert Mitchum: The Reluctant Star (TV Movie documentary)
- 1990 Vivien Leigh: Scarlett and Beyond (TV Movie documentary)
- 1990 Anthony Quinn: An Original (TV Movie documentary)
- 1990 Steve McQueen: Man on the Edge (Video documentary)
- 1988 Cary Grant: A Celebration of a Leading Man (TV Movie documentary)
- 1988 Gregory Peck: His Own Man (Documentary) (writer)
- 1987 Grace Kelly: The American Princess (Video documentary)
- 1986 Marilyn Monroe: Beyond the Legend (TV Movie documentary) (writer)
- 1984 Ingrid (Documentary) (writer)
- 1983 The Horror of It All (TV Movie documentary) (uncredited)
- 1982 Hollywood's Children (TV Movie documentary) (uncredited)
- 1977 Danny (writer)
