= Pierre Lepape =

French journalist and writer (1941–2021)

Pierre Lepape (1941 – 18 December 2021) was a French journalist, writer, and literary critic.

== Biography ==
Together with his wife, Michèle Gazier—a writer, translator, and editor—he wrote two literary essays and a novel that serves as a contemporary reimagining of Stendhal’s The Red and the Black: Noir et Or (Le Seuil, 2015). They later settled in the Gard.
