= Dieter Murmann =

German politician (1934–2021)

Chairman of the Economic Council Germany
- In office 1989–2000
- Preceded by: Heinrich Weiss
- Succeeded by: Kurt Joachim Lauk

Personal details
- Born: 12 May 1934 Dortmund, Westphalia, Prussia, Germany
- Died: 8 December 2021 (aged 87) Strande, Schleswig-Holstein, Germany
- Party: CDU

Dieter Murmann (12 May 1934 – 8 December 2021) was a German social market lobbyist. A member of the Christian Democratic Union of Germany, he served as Chairman of the Economic Council Germany from 1989 to 2000.
