= Joaquín Jiménez Hidalgo =

Spanish politician (1935–2021)

Member of the Senate of Spain
- In office 28 October 1982 – 23 April 1986
- Constituency: Málaga

Personal details
- Born: 18 December 1935 Luque, Spain
- Died: 2 December 2021 (aged 85) Antequera, Spain
- Party: AP; PP

Joaquín Jiménez Hidalgo (18 December 1935 – 2 December 2021) was a Spanish politician. A member of the People's Alliance, he served in the Senate of Spain from 1982 to 1986.
