= Ken Osinde =

Kenyan diplomat (1962–2021)

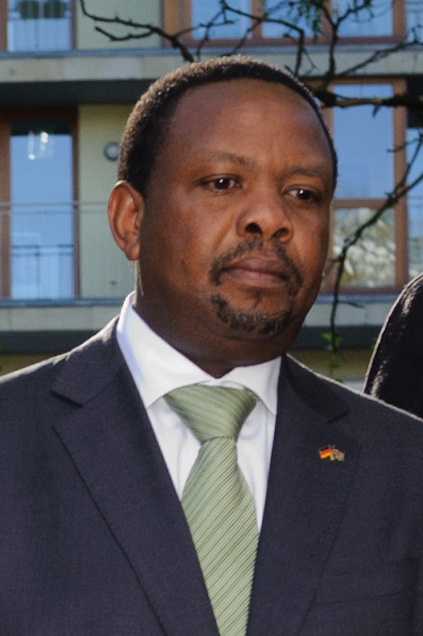
- Osinde in 2014

Kenya Ambassador to Germany
- In office September 2010 – October 2014
- President: Mwai Kibaki; Uhuru Kenyatta
- Preceded by: Harry Mutuma Kathurima
- Succeeded by: Joseph Magutt

Personal details
- Born: Kennedy Nyauncho Osinde; 18 August 1962; Kenya
- Died: 10 December 2021 (aged 59); Nairobi, Kenya

Kennedy Nyauncho Osinde (18 August 1962 – 10 December 2021) was a Kenyan ambassador. He served as Ambassador of Kenya to Germany from 2010 to 2014.
