= Enju Kato =

Japanese bhikkhu and politician (1919–2021)

Member of the Okazaki City Council
- In office 28 April 1967 – 25 October 1984

Personal details
- Born: 10 June 1919 Yahagi, Rikuzentakata, Japan
- Died: 9 December 2021 (aged 102)
- Party: Independent

Enju Kato (Japanese: 加藤 円住 Kato Enju; 10 June 1919 – 9 December 2021) was a Japanese bhikkhu and politician. An Independent, he served on the Okazaki City Council from 1967 to 1984.
