= Oleg Emirov =

Russian composer, arranger, and keyboardist (1970–2021)

- Born: 8 September 1970; Leningrad, Russian SFSR, Soviet Union
- Died: 5 December 2021 (aged 51); Moscow, Russia
- Occupation(s): Composer, arranger, keyboardist

Oleg Emirov (8 September 1970 – 5 December 2021) was a Russian composer, arranger, and keyboardist.
