= Alceste Madeira =

Brazilian politician (1944–2021)

Member of the Chamber of Deputies of Brazil
- In office 1990–2006
- Constituency: Amazonas

Personal details
- Born: Alceste Madeira Almeida do Nascimento; 22 March 1944 Manaus, Brazil
- Died: 15 December 2021 (aged 77) Caracaraí, Brazil
- Party: Republicans

Alceste Madeira Almeida do Nascimento (22 March 1944 – 15 December 2021) was a Brazilian politician. A member of the Republicans, he served in the Chamber of Deputies from 1990 to 2006.
