= Hiroshi Kuwashima =

Japanese politician (1932–2021)

- 桑島 博

Mayor of Morioka
- In office 2 September 1995 – 1 September 2003
- Preceded by: Daizō Ōta
- Succeeded by: Hiroaki Tanifuji

Personal details
- Born: 14 August 1932 Morioka, Iwate, Japan
- Died: 16 December 2021 (aged 89) Morioka, Iwate, Japan
- Party: Independent
- Education: Iwate University

Hiroshi Kuwashima (Japanese: 桑島博 Kuwashima Hiroshi; 14 August 1932 – 16 December 2021) was a Japanese politician. He served as mayor of Morioka from 1995 to 2003.
