= Sonja Krause =

Swiss-American polymer chemist (1933–2021)

Sonja Krause Goodwin (1933–2021) was a Swiss-American physical chemist specializing in the thermodynamics and effects of electric fields on polymer solutions, and also interested in climate history.

== Education and career ==
Krause was born in 1933 in St. Gallen, Switzerland. When she was a child, she left Europe with her parents to escape Nazi Germany, emigrating to New York City, where her parents sold German-language books. She went to the Bronx High School of Science, as one of the first women to attend that school, and graduated from the Rensselaer Polytechnic Institute in 1954. She completed a Ph.D. in 1958 at the University of California, Berkeley, with the dissertation Electric Birefringence Studies of Some Macromolecular Solutions Using Microsecond Transients.

After working in industry at the Rohm & Haas Company, she spent several years in the mid-1960s in the Peace Corps heading the physics department at the University of Lagos in Nigeria, and later in Ethiopia. She returned to Rensselaer as a faculty member in physical chemistry in 1967, and was named full professor in 1978. She retired in 2004.

== Books ==
Krause was a coauthor of the textbook Chemistry of the Environment (1978; 2nd ed., 2002, Harcourt/Academic Press, with R. A. Bailey, H. M. Clark, J. P. Ferris, and R. L. Strong). She also published her experiences in the Peace Corps as the two-book series My Years in the Early Peace Corps: Nigeria, 1964–1965 and My Years in the Early Peace Corps: Ethiopia, 1965–1966 (Hamilton Books, 2021).

== Recognition ==
Krause was named a Fellow of the American Physical Society (APS), after a nomination from the APS Division of Polymer Physics, in 1976. She was also a Fellow of the International Union of Pure and Applied Chemistry.
