= Nikolai Yegorov (politician, born 1921) =

Russian microbiologist and politician (1921–2021)

- Николай Егоров

Deputy Minister of Higher Education
- In office 1967–1988

Personal details
- Born: 5 January 1921 Suzdalsky Uyezd, Russian Socialist Federative Soviet Republic
- Died: 14 December 2021 (aged 100) Moscow, Russia
- Party: CPSU

Nikolai Sergeyevich Yegorov (Russian: Николай Сергеевич Егоров; 5 January 1921 – 14 December 2021) was a Soviet and Russian microbiologist and politician. A member of the Communist Party, he served as Deputy Minister of Higher Education from 1967 to 1988.
