= Aldo Rebecchi =

Italian politician (1946–2021)

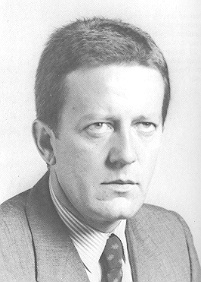
- Rebecchi in 1987

Member of the Chamber of Deputies of Italy
- In office 2 July 1987 – 29 May 2001
- Constituency: Lombardy

Personal details
- Born: 10 April 1946 Toscolano-Maderno, Italy
- Died: 6 December 2021 (aged 75) Brescia, Italy
- Party: PCI; PDS; DS; PD

Aldo Rebecchi (10 April 1946 – 6 December 2021) was an Italian politician. A member of the Italian Communist Party, Democratic Party of the Left, Democrats of the Left, and Democratic Party, he served in the Chamber of Deputies from 1987 to 2001.
