= François Lissarrague =

French historian and anthropologist (1947–2021)

- Born: 5 August 1947; Saint-Mandé, France
- Died: 15 December 2021 (aged 74)
- Occupations: Historian; Anthropologist

François Lissarrague (5 August 1947 – 15 December 2021) was a French historian and anthropologist. He specialized in Ancient Greece and particularly the study of its images.

== Biography ==
After earning a degree in classical literature from the Sorbonne, Lissarrague taught middle and secondary school. He published his thesis under the direction of Pierre Vidal-Naquet. He began working for the French National Centre for Scientific Research in 1980, where he served as director of research in 1995. In 1996, he became director of studies at the School for Advanced Studies in the Social Sciences.

He died on 15 December 2021, at the age of 74.

== Bibliography ==
- Un flot d’images. Une esthétique du banquet grec (1987)
- L’Autre Guerrier. Archers, peltastes, cavaliers dans l’imagerie attique (1990)
- Héros et dieux de l’Antiquité. Guide iconographique (1994)
- Vases grecs. Les Athéniens et leurs images (1999)
- La Cité des satyres. Une anthropologie ludique (Athènes vie – ve siècle av. J.-C.) (2013)
