= Lee Tae-bok =

South Korean politician (1950–2021)

Minister of Health and Welfare
- In office 29 January 2002 – 11 July 2002
- Preceded by: Kim Won-gil
- Succeeded by: Kim Sung-ho

Personal details
- Born: 11 December 1950 Boryeong, Korea
- Died: 3 December 2021 (aged 70)

Military service
- Branch/service: Republic of Korea Army
- Years of service: 1970s
- Rank: Sergeant

Lee Tae-bok (Korean: 이태복; 11 December 1950 – 3 December 2021) was a South Korean politician. He served as Minister of Health and Welfare from January to July 2002.
