= Rafik Petrosyan =

Armenian politician (1940–2021)

- Ռաֆիկ Պետրոսյանը

Member of the National Assembly
- In office ?

Personal details
- Born: 1 May 1940
- Died: 17 December 2021 (aged 81)
- Political party: Republican Party of Armenia

Rafik Petrosyan (Armenian: Ռաֆիկ Պետրոսյանը; 1 May 1940 – 17 December 2021) was an Armenian politician who served as a member of the National Assembly. He died on 17 December 2021, at the age of 81.
