= Nkodo Sitony =

Cameroonian singer (1959–2021)

- Born: Nkodo Si Tobi François; 25 August 1959; Douala, French Cameroon, French Equatorial Africa, France
- Died: 21 December 2021 (aged 62); Yaoundé, Cameroon
- Occupation: Singer

Nkodo Sitony (25 August 1959 – 21 December 2021) was a Cameroonian singer.

== Life and career ==
Sitony was a popular singer of the bikutsi genre in the 1980s, and worked alongside Mongo Faya. He died at the Central Hospital of Yaoundé on 21 December 2021, at the age of 62.

== Discography ==
- Mba Mvoe
- Metil Wa
- Ngoan Ezoum
- Wa Yi Ma Wo Ya
