= Robert Malinowski =

Polish volleyball player (1957–2021)

Personal information
- Nationality: Polish
- Born: 1 March 1957; Warsaw, Poland
- Died: 8 December 2021 (aged 64); Paderborn North Rhine-Westphalia,

Sport
- Sport: Volleyball
- Team: Rzemieślnik Warszawa Gwardia Warsaw AZS Warsaw Hutnik Kraków Legia Warsaw

Robert Malinowski (1 March 1957 – 8 December 2021) was a Polish volleyball player. He competed at the 1980 Summer Olympics. His achievements also include two European vice-championship titles (1979 and 1981) and he was Polish champion three times (1983, 1984, 1986). He played 68 games for the Poland men's national volleyball team.
