= Mario Turchetti =

Italian historian and academic (1944–2021)

- Born: Mario Salvatore Turchetti de Bagnoregio; 7 February 1944; Taormina, Italy
- Died: 5 December 2021 (aged 77); Geneva, Switzerland
- Occupations: Professor; Historian

Mario Salvatore Turchetti de Bagnoregio (7 February 1944 – 5 December 2021) was an Italian historian and academic. He specialized in the French Wars of Religion.

== Biography ==
Turchetti was born to pianist Galliano Turchetti de Bagnoregio and wife teacher Maria Fichera de Taormina in Taormina in 1944. He earned a degree in mathematics from the University of Messina in 1963 and was awarded a scholarship in philosophy in 1968. He perfected his studies of historiography at the Istituto italiano per gli studi storici and began writing papers on religious wars. He earned his doctorate from the University of Geneva in 1982 and four years later became an associate professor of history at the University of Messina. He made several stays at All Souls College, Oxford, University of Wisconsin–Madison, Paris-Sorbonne University, and at Paris Descartes University. In 1993, he became a full professor and was chair of Modern History at the University of Fribourg. He retired in 2015.

He died in Geneva on 5 December 2021, at the age of 77.

== Works ==
- Concordia o tolleranza ? François Bauduin (1520-1573) e i « Moyenneurs » (1984)
- "Concorde ou tolérance ? Les Moyenneurs à la veille des guerres de religion en France" (1986)
- "La liberté de conscience et l'autorité du Magistrat au lendemain de la Révocation" (1991)
- "Une question mal posée : la Confession d'Augsbourg, le cardinal de Lorraine et les Moyenneurs au Colloque de Poissy en 1561" (1993)
- "Calvin face aux tenants de la concorde (moyenneurs) et aux partisans de la tolérance (castellionistes)" (1998)
- "Middle Parties in France during the Wars of Religion" (1999)
- "Une question mal posée : l'origine et l'identité des Politiques au temps des guerres de religion" (2002)
- Tirania şi tiranicidul : forme ale opresiunii şi dreptul la rezistenţă din Antichitate pînă în zilele noastre (2003)
- "Droit de Résistance, à quoi ? Démasquer aujourd'hui le despotisme et la tyrannie" (2006)
- "Despotism and Tyranny. Unmasking a Tenacious Confusion" (2008)
- "Tyrannicie or Regicide ? The Assassination of Charles I in the Controversy between Milton and Salmasius, with a Comparative Analyse of two Trials (1649-1660)" (2009)
- Jean Bodin (2010)
- Tyrannie et Tyrannicide de l’Antiquité à nos jours (2013)
