= Kim Moon-ki =

South Korean politician (1932–2021)

Member of the National Assembly of South Korea
- In office 13 May 1985 – 29 May 1996
- Preceded by: position established
- Succeeded by: Choi Wook-cheol
- Constituency: Myeongju-gun Yangyang-gun

Personal details
- Born: 7 March 1932 Gangneung, Korea, Empire of Japan
- Died: 19 December 2021 (aged 89)
- Party: DJP; DLP; ULD

Kim Moon-ki (Korean: 김문기; 7 March 1932 – 19 December 2021) was a South Korean politician. A member of the Democratic Justice Party and later the Democratic Liberal Party, he served in the National Assembly from 1985 to 1996. He died on 19 December 2021, at the age of 89.
