= Viktor Gnezdilov =

Russian politician (1943–2021)

Mayor of Nakhodka
- In office 1987–2004
- Preceded by: Alexey Tkachev
- Succeeded by: Oleg Kolyadin

Personal details
- Born: 17 January 1943 Anna, Primorsky Krai, Russian SFSR, Soviet Union
- Died: 13 December 2021 (aged 78)
- Party: United Russia

Viktor Semyonovich Gnezdilov (Russian: Виктор Семёнович Гнезди́лов; 17 January 1943 – 13 December 2021) was a Russian politician. A member of United Russia, he served as mayor of Nakhodka from 1987 to 2004.
