= Eugenio Minasso =

Italian politician (1959–2021)

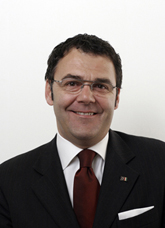

Member of the Chamber of Deputies of Italy
- In office 29 April 2008 – 14 March 2013
- Constituency: Liguria

Personal details
- Born: 11 June 1959 Sanremo, Italy
- Died: 6 December 2021 (aged 62) Genoa, Italy
- Party: PdL

Eugenio Minasso (11 June 1959 – 6 December 2021) was an Italian politician.

== Biography ==
A member of The People of Freedom, he served in the Chamber of Deputies from 2008 to 2013.

Minasso died from COVID-19 in Genoa, on 6 December 2021, at the age of 62.
