= Mary Alice Thatch =

American newspaper editor (1943–2021)

- Born: July 6, 1943
- Died: December 28, 2021 (aged 78)

Mary Alice Thatch (July 6, 1943 – December 28, 2021) was an American newspaper editor. She was the editor and publisher of the Wilmington Journal, the oldest black newspaper in North Carolina. She played a key role in the pardon of the Wilmington Ten.
