= Guenshi Ever =

Beninese singer (died 2021)

- Born: Guendehou Sidonie Evelyne
- Died: 25 December 2021
- Occupation: Singer

Guendehou Sidonie Evelyne (died 25 December 2021), better known by the stage name Guenshi Ever, was a Beninese singer.

== Life and career ==
In 1983, Guenshi Ever participated in an album alongside Honoré Avolonto, Danialou Sagbohan, and Vicky Amenoudji, among others. She was the lead singer of Side A of the album alongside Amenoudji. She released a solo album in 1988 which contained the titles Senye, Musumugbaléo, and Gbèmèdan. The following year, she released an album on vinyl titled "obe oho yesron" with the label Gaseg. In 2017, Beninese singer Ayodélé announced the release of her new song alongside Ever.

== Death ==
Guenshi Ever died on 25 December 2021.
