= Manuel Garza González =

Mexican politician (1933–2021)

Manuel Garza González (25 August 1933 – 18 December 2021) was a Mexican politician who served as a member of the Chamber of Deputies. He died on 18 December 2021, at the age of 88.
