= Marek Moszczyński =

Polish politician (1949–2021)

Deputy Marshal of Lower Silesian Voivodeship
- In office 7 December 2006 – 5 March 2008
- In office 10 June 2003 – 25 August 2004

Personal details
- Born: 16 January 1949 Wrocław, Poland
- Died: 14 December 2021 (aged 72) Wrocław, Poland
- Party: PO

Marek Moszczyński (16 January 1949 – 14 December 2021) was a Polish politician. A member of the Civic Platform, he served as Deputy Marshal of Lower Silesian Voivodeship from 2003 to 2004 and again from 2006 to 2008.
