= Élizabeth Herrgott =

French romancier (1941–2021)

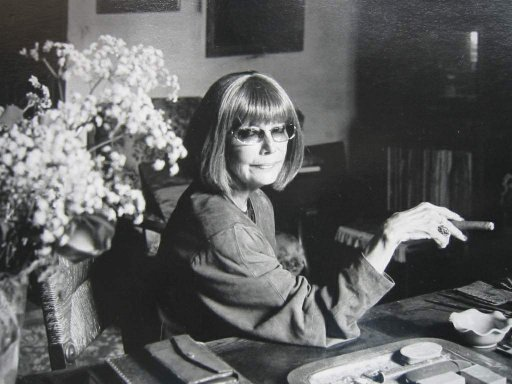
- Born: 27 April 1941
- Died: 13 December 2021 (aged 80); La Loye, France
- Occupation: Romancier

Élizabeth Herrgott (27 April 1941 – 13 December 2021) was a French writer who specialized in erotic and pornographic material.

== Life and career ==
Herrgott became a model in Tunis at age 21. After earning an agrégation in grammar, she began following the beliefs of Jacques Lacan. She received psychoanalysis from a man and a woman from the Quatrième Groupe and was a founding member of the Cahiers de lectures freudiennes. Her works were emblematically marked by the study of perversion, sadomasochism, fetishism, and lesbianism.

Inspired by Marquis de Sade, Herrgott published Lettres d'amour à des hommes et à quelques femmes and Le gynécée. During this time, she wrote columns in Vogue and Penthouse and took part in the television show of André Bercoff on France Régions 3, Français si vous parliez. She appeared on a weekly cooking show aired on Aligre FM to give listeners erotic recipes. In 1998, she allowed Abel Ferrara to write her biography.

Herrgott wrote numerous short story collections in the early 2000s, such as Fantasmes de femmes, Pulsions de femmes, Extases de femmes, and Mionne ou la dixième muse. She continued to write novels for the remainder of her life.

She died in La Loye on 13 December 2021, at the age of 80.

== Publications ==
- Lettres d'amour à des hommes et à quelques femmes (1987)
- Le Gynécée (1989)
- Le Dieu et l'amant déchu (1992)
- Recettes coquines et libertines (1992)
- Recettes de Maître-Queux (1993)
- Transports amoureux (1994)
- L'Amant de la Vierge Marie (1996)
- Lettres à l'Amant (1997)
- Le destin d'Abel ou An outburst of love (Un élan d'amour) (1999)
- Mes Hiérodules (2000)
- Ressuscitée, Fantasmes de Femmes (collectif) (2001)
- Mionne ou la dixième muse (2002)
- Les Sorcières du Val d'Amour (2003)
- Mes chéris sont homos, Pulsions de Femmes (collectif) (2006)
- L'Homme emprunté, Extases de Femmes (collectif) (2007)
- L'Inavouable : Les amours canines, L'imposteur et la perversité du nain (2008)
- La Masturbatrice, Jouissances de Femmes (collectif) (2008)
- La Monstrue, Rêves de Femmes (collectif) (2009)
- Mon soumis insoumis, Folies de Femmes (collectif) (2010)
- Annonces classées (2012)
- L'effervescence des sens (2017)
