= Ignacio Martín Amaro =

Spanish politician (1944–2021)

Ignacio Martín Amaro (1944 – December 2021) was a Spanish politician who served as a Senator.
