= Krystyna Gozdawa-Nocoń =

Polish politician (1949–2021)

Deputy Voivode of Pomeranian Voivodeship
- In office 2003–2006
- Preceded by: Stanisław Kochanowski
- Succeeded by: Piotr Karczewski

Personal details
- Born: 6 March 1949 Gdańsk, Poland
- Died: 18 December 2021 (aged 72)
- Party: UP; SLD

Krystyna Gozdawa-Nocoń (6 March 1949 – 18 December 2021) was a Polish politician. A member of the Labour Union and the Democratic Left Alliance, she served as Deputy Voivode of Pomeranian Voivodeship from 2003 to 2006.
