= Deichtorhallen =

Deictorhallen
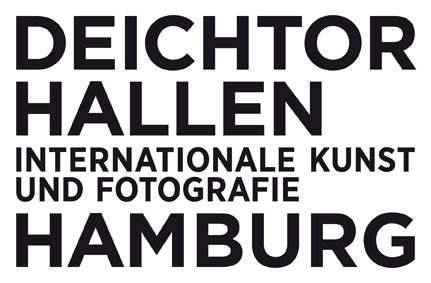

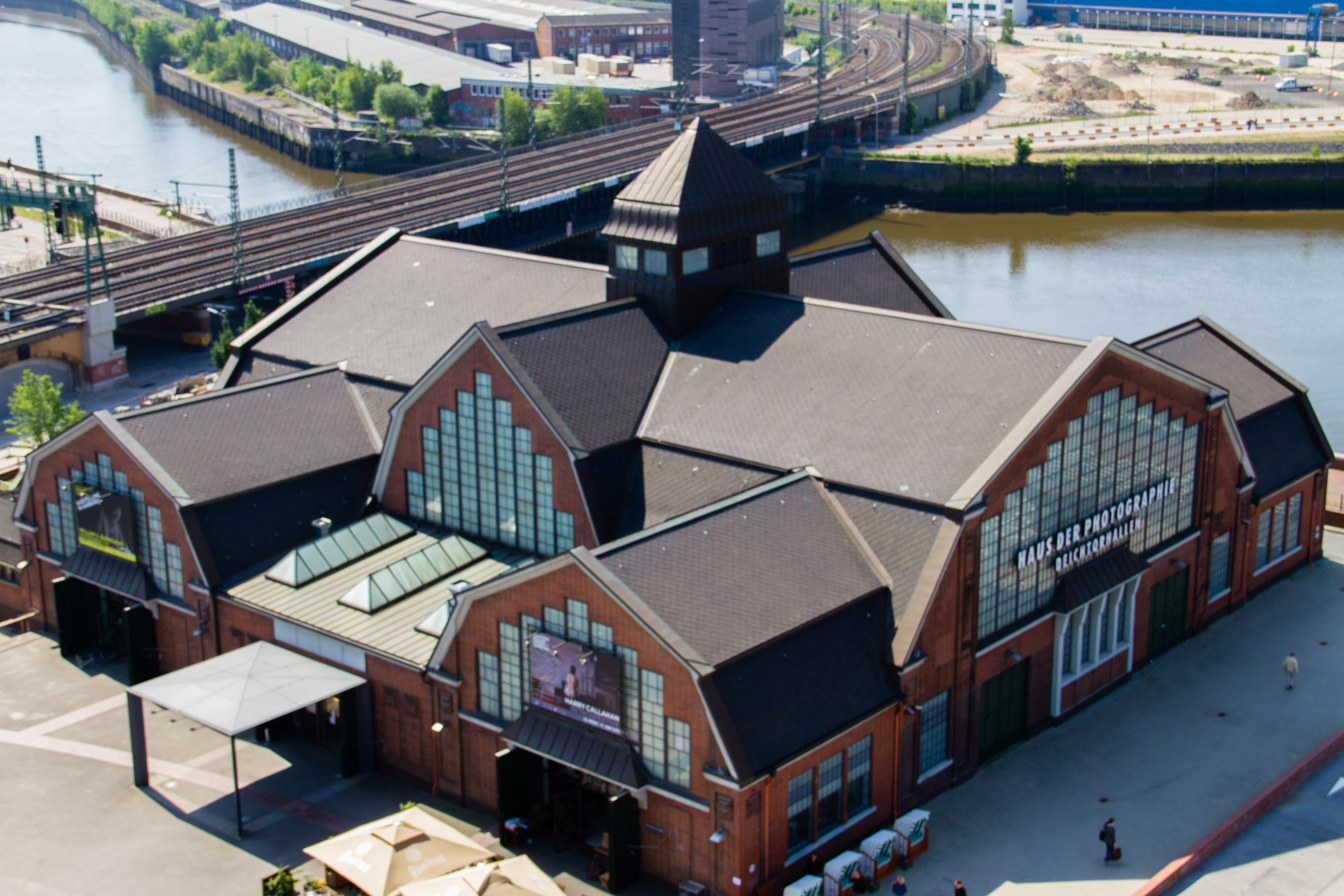
- View of the north and west side of the Deichtorhallen
- Established: 1911-1914
- Location: Hamburg, Germany
- Coordinates: 53.547083°N 10.006841°E
- Type: Art museum
- Director: Dr. Dirk Luckow
- Website: deichtorhallen.de

The Deichtorhallen in Hamburg, Germany, is one of Europe's largest art centers for contemporary art and photography. The two historical buildings dating from 1911 to 1913 are notable examples of industrial architecture from the transitional period between Art Nouveau and 20th-century design, with their open steel-and-glass structures. Their architecture creates a backdrop for spectacular major international exhibitions.

In 2005 the southern hall was dedicated to the medium of photography, creating the House of Photography, which was conceived decisively by F. C. Gundlach.

Since 2011, the two buildings at the interface of Hamburg's Kunstmeile and Hafencity have been supplemented by a satellite in Hamburg's Harburg district, the Sammlung Falckenberg. It comprises around 2,400 works of contemporary art, focusing on German and American contemporary art from the last 40 years.

== History ==
Between 1911 and 1914, the "Deichtorhallen" ("the levee gate halls") were built as market halls on the grounds of the former Berliner Bahnhof railway station, Hamburg's counterpart to Berlin's Hamburger Bahnhof. They constitute one of the few surviving examples of industrial architecture from the transitional period between Art Nouveau and 20th century styles. The two halls are open steel structures, the northern hall is a longitudinal edifice boasting three naves and a 3,800 m^{2} footprint; the southern hall (1,800 m^{2}) is a building with a lantern roof. Rupprecht Matthies created two "language cylinders" visitors can walk through for Deichtorplatz, which is also home to a Richard Serra sculpture. In the northern hall, there is a line of neon writing by Mario Merz and a "Blue Disc" by Imi Knoebel.

The Körber Foundation gifted the restored Deichtorhallen to the City of Hamburg. In 1989, they were assigned to a limited liability company: Deichtorhallen-Ausstellungs GmbH. On 9 November 1989, Deichtorhallen's international art exhibition program opened with the show "Einleuchten", curated by Harald Szeemann.

Deichtorhallen Hamburg has emerged as an exhibition center for photography and contemporary art with three pillars of activities, three institutions under the single Deichtorhallen brand. Since 2009, Dirk Luckow has been artistic director of Deichtorhallen Hamburg.

== Exhibitions (selection) ==
- Wolfgang Tillmans (2001)
- Martin Parr (2004)
- Martin Munkácsi (2005)
- Jonathan Meese (2006)
- Georg Baselitz (2007)
- Erwin Wurm (2007)
- Fischli & Weiss (2008)
- F. C. Gundlach (2008)
- Lillian Bassman / Paul Himmel (2009)
- Herbert Tobias (2009)
- Katharina Fritsch (2009)
- Nobuyoshi Araki (2010)
- Poul Gernes (2010)
- Julia Stoschek Collection (2010)
- Gilbert & George (2011)
- Marilyn Minter (2011)
- Anselm Reyle (2012)
- Horizon Field Hamburg by Antony Gormley (2012)
- Sarah Moon (2015)
- Hanne Darboven (2017)
- Sarah Morris (2023)
