= Jesse Alexander (photographer) =

American photographer (1929–2021)

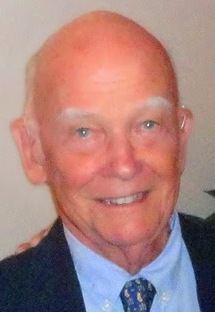
- Jesse Alexander at Montecito Classic
- Born: 1929; Santa Barbara, California
- Died: 15 December 2021 (aged 91–92); Santa Barbara, California
- Occupation: Photographer

Jesse Alexander (born 1929 in Santa Barbara, California, died December 15, 2021, in Santa Barbara, California) was an American photographer who covered motorsports, portraits, birds and travel. He also published several books.

One of his first photo expeditions was in 1953 to the Carrera Panamericana race in Mexico. Since 1954, he covered large European races such as 24 Hours of Le Mans in France, and the Mille Miglia and Targa Florio of Italy. While in Europe he also photographed culture celebrities for The New York Times, and was the European editor for Car and Driver magazine.

In 1974 Roland Coate Jr. designed a distinctive, massive concrete Brutalist home for Alexander and his wife in Montecito, CA. The home, known as Mudhouse, was largely underground and subsequently purchased by comedian Steve Martin.

He exhibited at the Birmingham Museum of Art, the Akron Art Museum, and the Santa Barbara Museum of Art.

== Books ==
- Monaco: The Golden Age of the Grand Prix by Jesse Alexander, At Speed Press, 2014
- Inside the Archives of Jesse Alexander, David Bull Publishing, 2010
- Portraits: Photographs by Jesse Alexander, David Bull Publishing, 2008
- Ferrari Grand Prix Moments: Formula One Photographs by Jesse Alexander, David Bull Publishing, 2007
- Porsche Moments: Photographs from Europe and Mexico by Jesse Alexander, David Bull Publishing, 2006
- Driven: The Racing Photography of Jesse Alexander 1954–1962, Chronicle Books, 2000
- At Speed: Jesse Alexander, Bond/Parkhurst Books, 1972
- Looking Back with Jesse Alexander, At Speed Press, 1972

== Exhibitions ==
- 2016 The Photographs of Jesse Alexander, at Petersen Automotive Museum, Los Angeles. Solo exhibition.
- 2007 Made in Santa Barbara, at Santa Barbara Museum of Art, Santa Barbara. Group exhibition.
- 2000 Drivers: Jesse Alexander, at Staley-Wise Gallery, New York. Solo exhibition.
