= Bread pudding =

Pudding made with stale bread

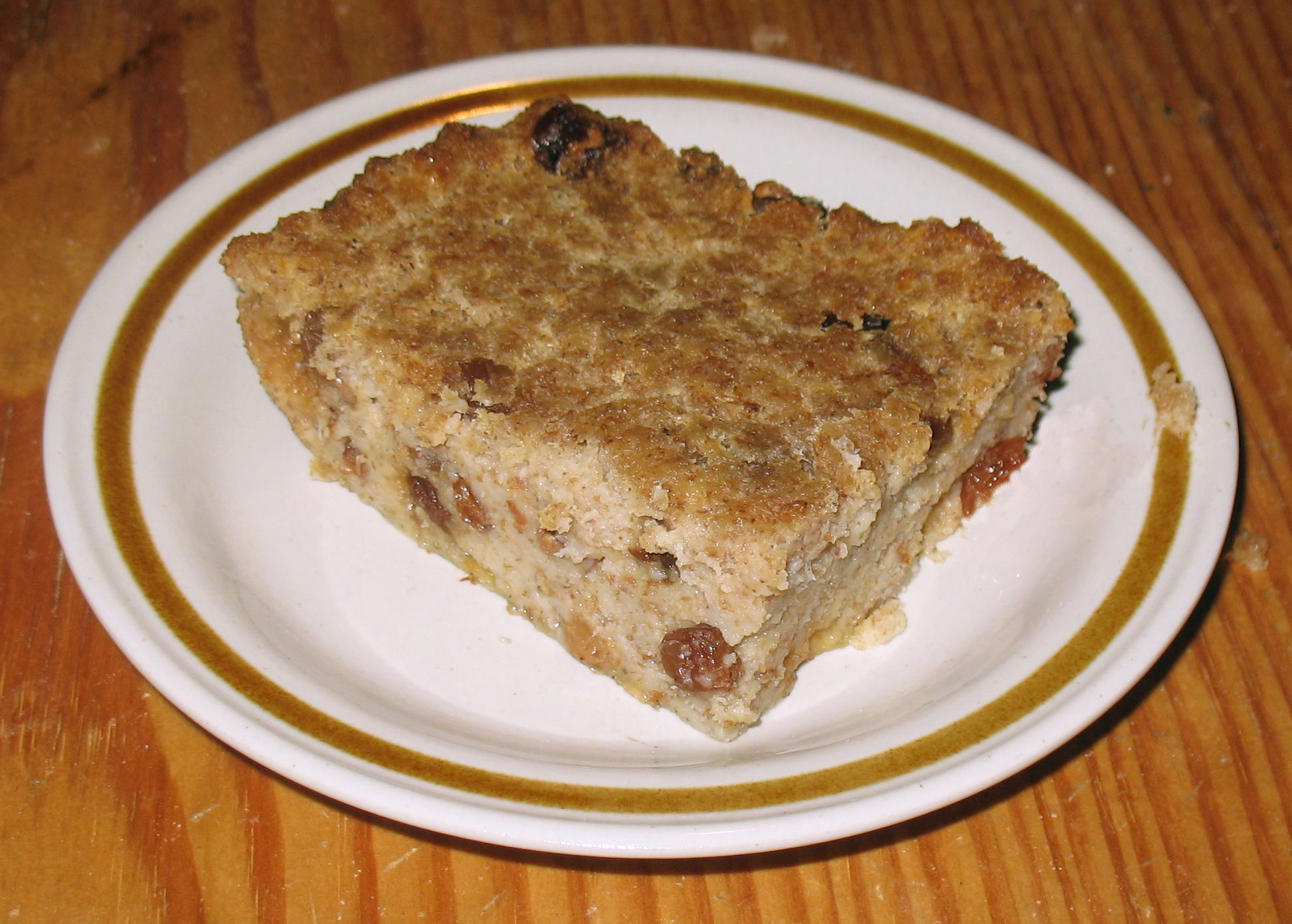
- Type: Pudding
- Region or state: England
- Main ingredients: Usually stale bread; combination of milk or water or cream, eggs, suet, sugar or syrup, dried fruit, and spices
- Variations: Nelson cake, Wet Nelly

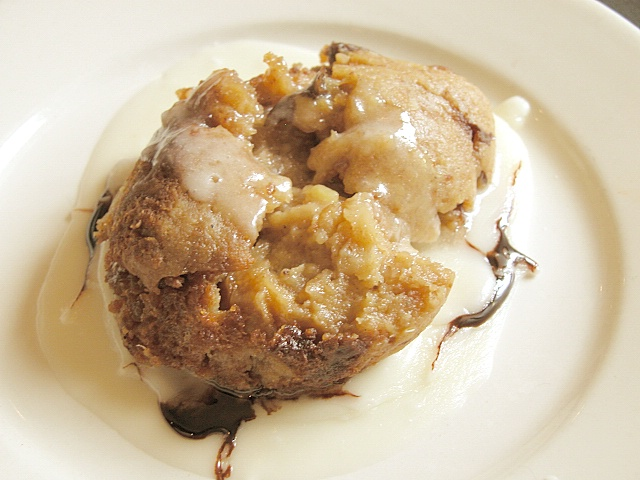
Austin Leslie's Creole bread pudding with vanilla whiskey sauce, from the late Pampy's Restaurant in New Orleans, Louisiana

Bread pudding is a dessert, that originated in Britain, that is made with stale bread and milk, cream or water. It generally also contains eggs, a form of fat such as oil, butter or suet and, depending on whether the pudding is sweet or savory, a variety of other ingredients. Sweet bread puddings may use sugar, syrup, honey, dried fruit, and nuts, as well as spices such as cinnamon, nutmeg, mace, and vanilla. The bread is soaked in the liquids, mixed with the other ingredients, and baked.

Savory puddings like breakfast strata may be served as main courses, while sweet puddings are typically eaten as desserts.

The dessert is also known as poor man's pudding or just pudding. In other languages, its name is a translation of bread pudding or pudding, including pudín and budín. In the Philippines, bread pudding made with Pandesal is popular. In Mexico, there is a similar dish eaten during Lent called capirotada. In Liverpool in the United Kingdom, a moist version of Nelson Squares, itself a bread pudding with shortcrust pastry, is nicknamed "Wet Nelly".

== History ==
Bread pudding originated with 11th-century English cooks who repurposed leftover stale bread. In the following centuries, the dish became known as "poor man's pudding" because of the scarcity of food at the time, with the pudding being made only with boiling water, sugar, and spices.

It was only in the 13th century that eggs and milk were added to the recipe, which then became known as Bread and butter pudding.

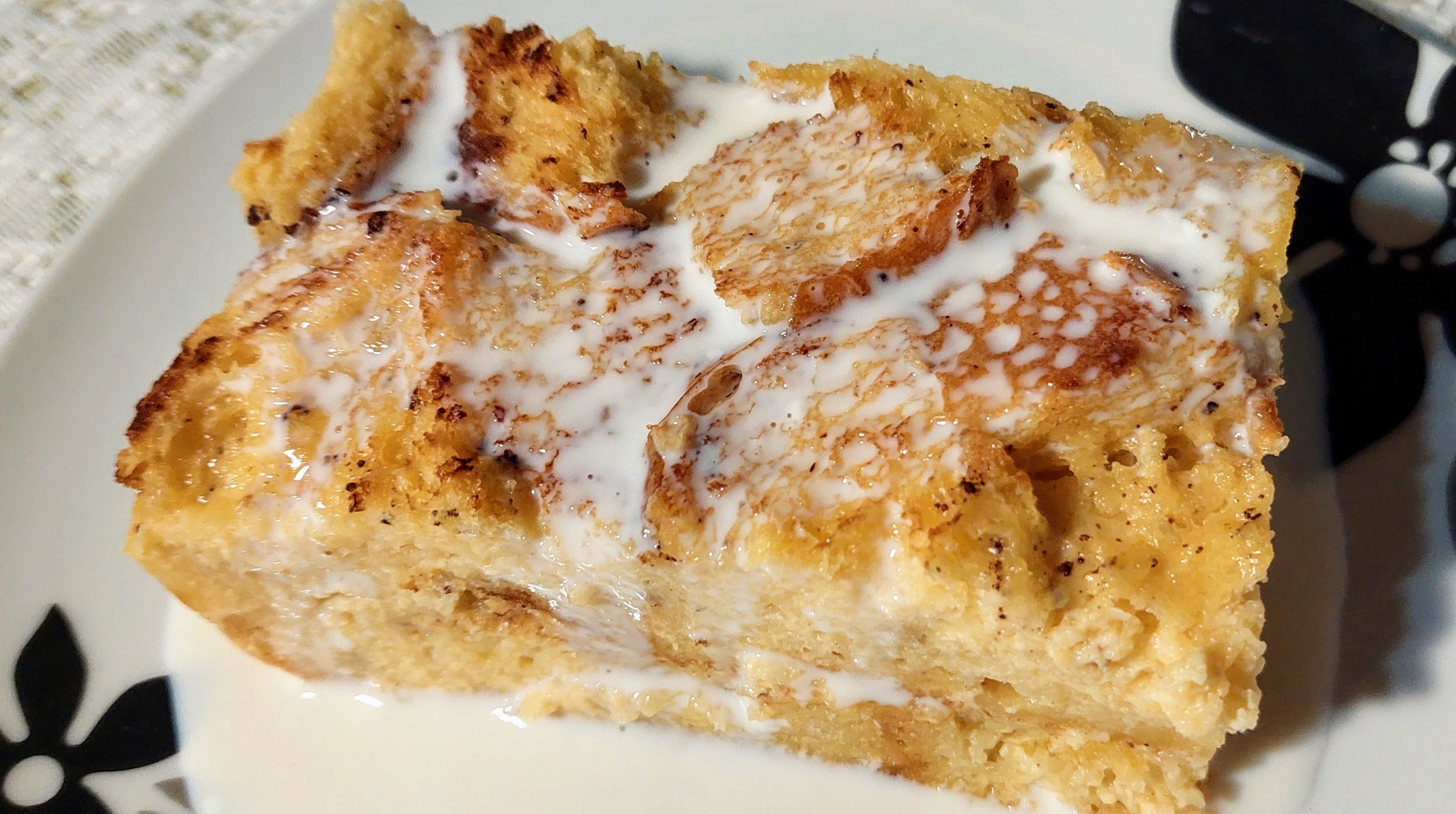
American bread pudding

The 18th-century English cookbook The Compleat Housewife contains two recipes for baked bread pudding. The first is identified as "A Bread and Butter Pudding for Fasting Days".

With the arrival of the first settlers in the 13 English Colonies in America, bread pudding became popular in the colonies and later in the United States.

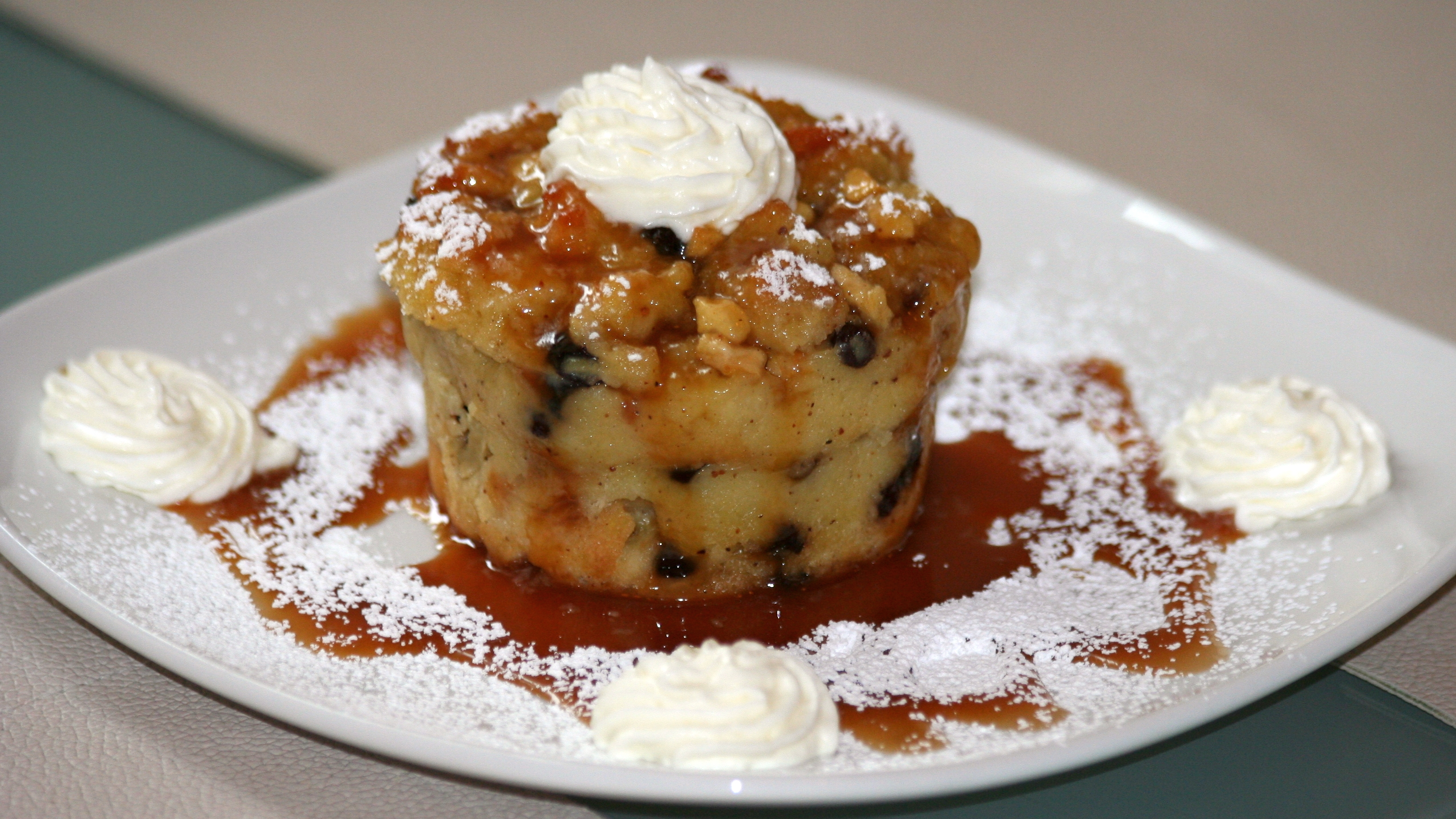
Bread pudding served at a restaurant in Harmony, Minnesota

== Regional variations ==
=== Asia ===
In Hong Kong, bread pudding is usually served with vanilla cream dressing.

In Malaysia, bread pudding is eaten with custard sauce.

In the Philippines, stale unsold bread is commonly used by bakeries to make the characteristically bright-red filling of pan de regla.

In Southeast Asian regions like Malaysia, Singapore, and Indonesia, bread pudding is sometimes found in local dessert shops. To cater to local preferences, it may incorporate ingredients such as coconut milk, pandan leaves, palm sugar, and tropical fruits.

In Turkey, bread pudding is known as ekmek kadayıfı and served with a slice of kaymak or ice cream on top of the cake which is garnished with ground pistachio or shredded coconut.

In the Levant, Aish as-Saraya is a popular bread pudding, flavored with rose water.

In Myanmar, bread pudding known as "Pu Tin" in Burmese has been a popular dessert since colonial times. It is also added to a desert known as Falooda.

In Bangladesh, a variation of bread pudding called Shahi Tukra, has existed in the region since Mughal times. Shahi Tukra (also spelled Tukda) is known in Hyderabad as Double Ka Meetha.

=== Americas ===
In Canada, bread pudding is sometimes made with maple syrup. In Quebec, it is known as Pouding chômeur.

In Puerto Rico, there are many variations of bread pudding on the island. Cream cheese with lime zest and guava or coconut-sweet plantain with rum raisins is perhaps the most popular. Bread pudding is always made with a variety of spices. Puerto Rican bread pudding is cooked the same as crème caramel with caramel poured into a baking dish and then the pudding mix is poured on top. The baking dish is placed in a bain-marie and then in the oven.

In Argentina, Peru, Paraguay, and Uruguay, bread pudding is known as "budín de pan".

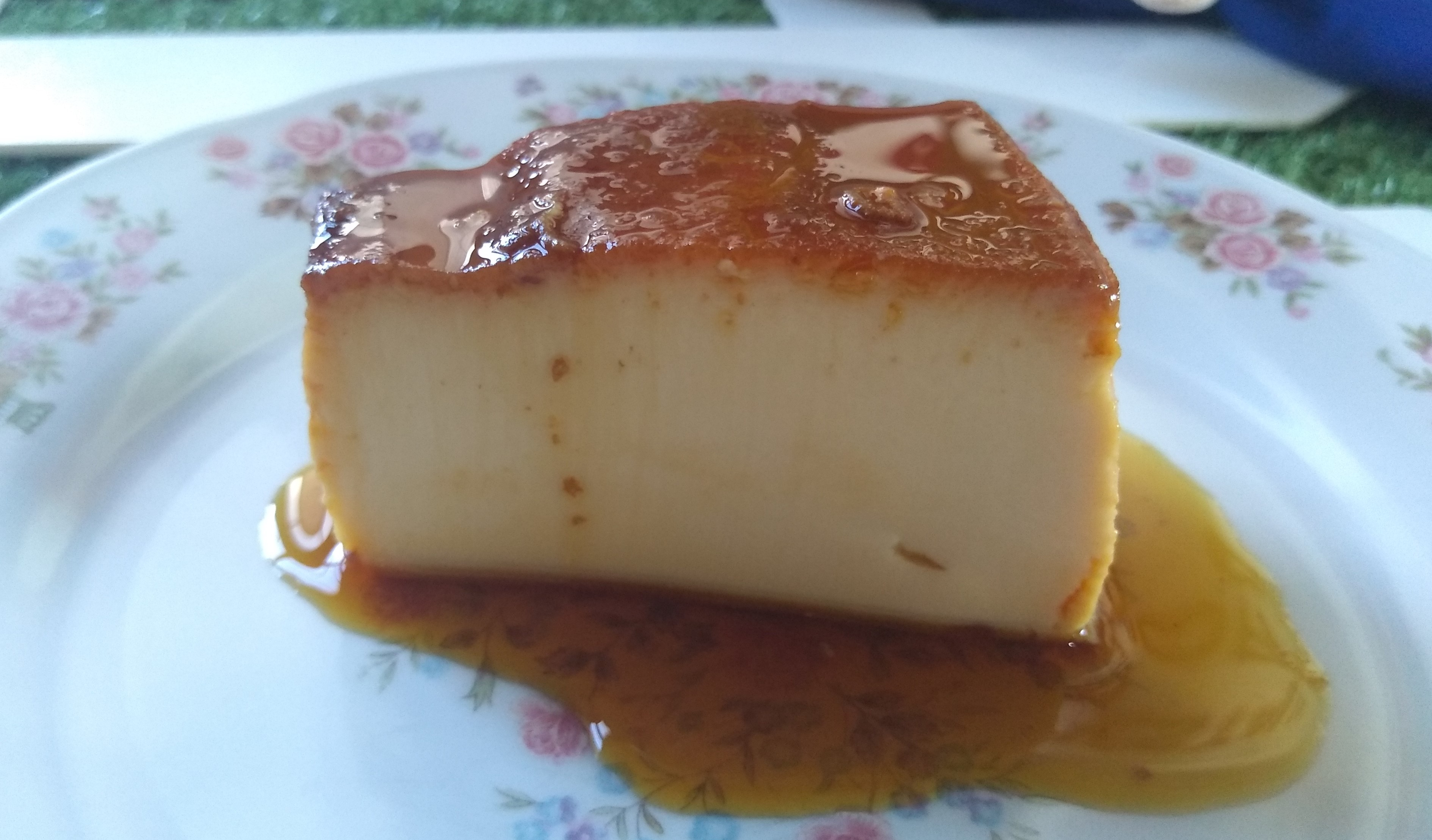
Brazilian bread pudding (Pudim de Pão)

In Brazil, bread pudding is known as "pudim de pão". The dish consists of bread, eggs, milk, condensed milk, butter, vanilla extract, and a pinch of cinnamon (optional). However, all the ingredients are mixed together in a blender and poured into a bundt-like mold (with a hole in the middle) lined with caramelized sugar syrup, which is then baked in a water bath for about 1 hour and a half. Afterwards, it is left to cool before unmolding and serving. When ready, its appearance can be compared to a creamy yet dense flan.

In Panama, bread pudding is known as "mamallena".

In Aruba, bread pudding is known as "pan bolo".

In Cuba, bread pudding is known as "pudín de pan" and many serve it with a guava marmalade.

In Chile, bread pudding is known as "colegial" or "budín de pan".

In Mexico it is simply known as "budín" and is usually made with bolillo leftovers. It's typically made with raisins and pecans.

In the United States, especially Louisiana, bread puddings are typically sweet and served as dessert with a sweet sauce of some sort, such as whiskey sauce, rum sauce, or caramel sauce.

=== Europe ===
In the United Kingdom, bread pudding is made with seasonings such as nutmeg and cinnamon. It is served with a rum or whisky sauce or a hot custard. "Nelson Squares" is a bread pudding that sits in between shortcrust pastry.

In Belgium, particularly Brussels, bread pudding is baked with brown sugar, cinnamon, stale bread, and raisins or apple.

In Hungary, it is called Máglyarakás (literally, "bonfire") which is baked with whipped egg whites on top.

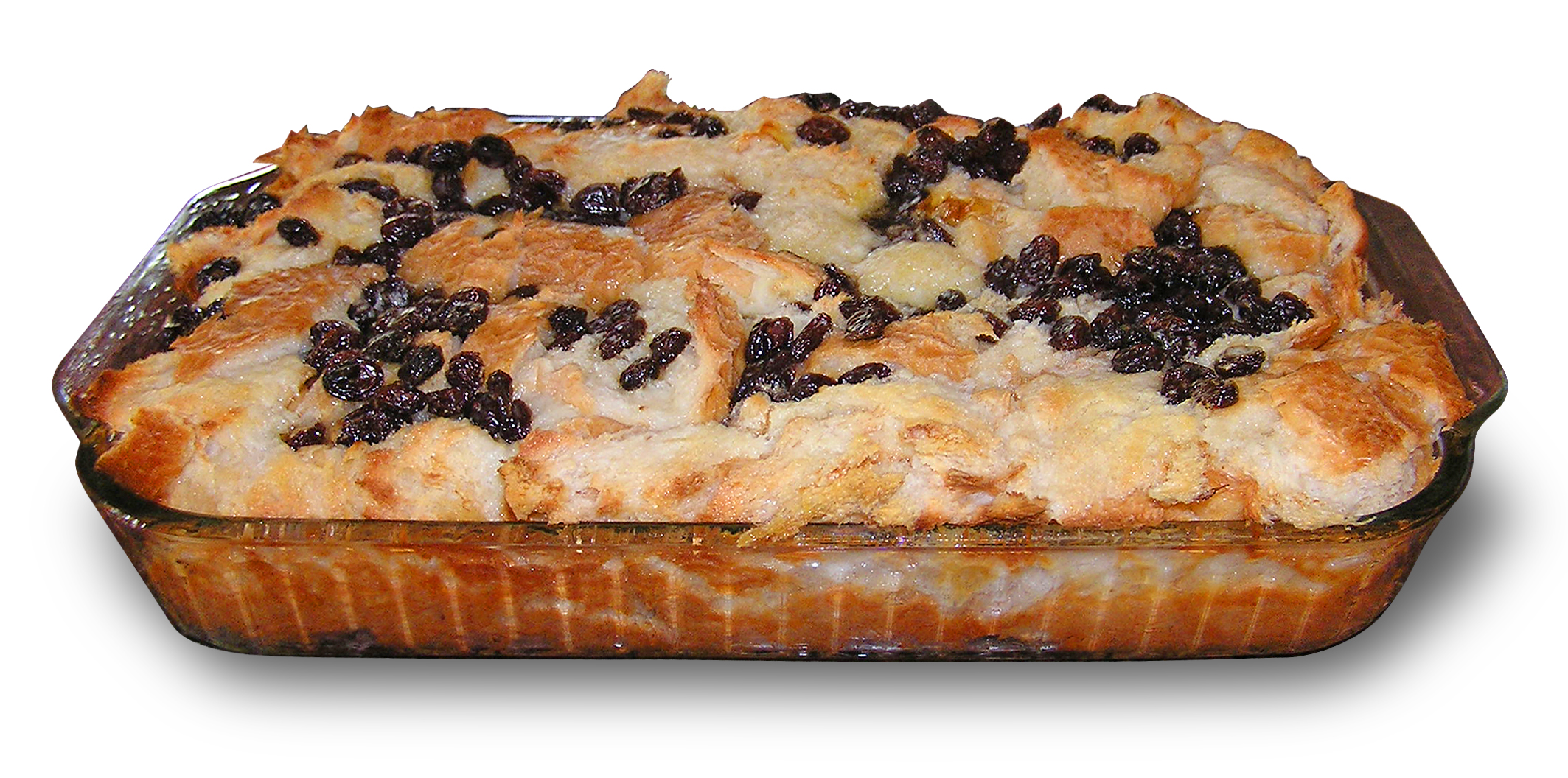
Black bread pudding, Mecklenburg

In Mecklenburg-Vorpommern, Germany, black bread is used to make "black bread pudding" (Schwarzbrotpudding).

In the Czech Republic and Slovakia bread pudding is known as "žemľovka" and is most commonly made of apples, raisins and rohlíks or veka, soaked in sweet milk with whipped egg whites on top.

== See also ==
- Bread and butter pudding
- Ekmek kadayıfı
- Cabinet pudding
- Klappertaart
- List of bread dishes
- Pain à la grecque
