= Lillian Bassman =

American photographer and painter (1917-2012)

- Born: June 15, 1917; Brooklyn, New York, U.S.
- Died: February 13, 2012 (aged 94); Manhattan, New York, U.S.
- Occupations: fashion photographer, painter

Lillian Bassman (June 15, 1917 – February 13, 2012) was an American photographer and painter.

== Early life and background ==
Her parents were Jewish intellectuals who emigrated to the United States from Ukraine (then in Russia) in 1905 and settled in Brooklyn, New York. She grew up in Brooklyn and Greenwich Village, New York, and studied at the Textile High School in Manhattan with future artist Alexey Brodovitch and graduated in 1933.

== Career ==
Bassman's photo Fantasy On The Dance Floor: Barbara (Elise) Mullen in a Christian Dior Dress, Paris. First published in Harper's Bazaar in 1949.

From the 1940s until the 1960s Bassman worked as a fashion photographer and art director for Junior Bazaar and Harper's Bazaar where she promoted the careers of photographers such as Richard Avedon, Robert Frank, Louis Faurer and Arnold Newman. Under the guidance of the Russian emigrant, Alexey Brodovitch, she began to photograph her model subjects primarily in black and white. Her work was published for the most part in Harper's Bazaar from 1950 to 1965.

By the 1970s Bassman's interest in pure form in her fashion photography was out of vogue. She turned to her own photo projects and abandoned fashion photography. In doing so she tossed out 40 years of negatives and prints—her life's work. A forgotten bag filled with hundreds of images was discovered over 20 years later. Bassman's fashion photographic work began to be re-appreciated in the 1990s.

She worked with digital technology and abstract color photography into her nineties to create a new series of work. She used Photoshop for her image manipulation.

The most notable qualities about her photographic work are the high contrasts between light and dark, the graininess of the finished photos, and the geometric placement and camera angles of the subjects. Bassman became one of the last great woman photographers in the world of fashion. A generation later, Bassman's pioneering photography and her mentor Alexey Brodovitch's bold cropping and layout innovations were a seminal influence on Sam Haskins and his black and white work of the sixties

Bassman was featured in the 2010 Swedish Halle of Femmes book, Hall of Femmes: Lillian Bassman, and even after her death her work has been exhibited internationally.

Bassman died on February 13, 2012, at age 94.

== Personal life ==
She first met her future husband, photographer Paul Himmel (born 1914), at Coney Island at age six. They met again at 13, and started living together when she was 15. They were married in 1935, and had two children. Himmel died in 2009 after 73 years of marriage.

== Notable works ==
- Anneliese Seubert, 1997
- It's a Cinch, 1951
- Betty Beihn, Nude I, 1950/2012

== Exhibitions (selection) ==
- 1974 Staempfli Gallery, New York
- 1993 Howard Greenberg Gallery, New York
- 1993 "Vanité", Palais de Tokyo
- 1994 Jackson Fine Art Gallery, Atlanta, Georgia
- 1994 "Homage to Lillian Bassman," Caroussel du Louvre, Paris
- 1997 Fashion Institute of Technology, New York
- 1997 Peter Fetterman Gallery, Los Angeles
- 1999 "Les dames de Bazaar" Rencontres de la photographie, Arles
- 2002 Garden Prado, Madrid
- 2003 Galerie f5,6 in Munich, Germany
- 2004 Staley-Wise Gallery, New York
- 2005 Farmani Gallery, Los Angeles, USA
- 2005 A touch of mystery - Triennale der Photographie Hamburg 2005, Photography Monika Mohr Galerie, Hamburg
- 2006 Selektion # 1 - Arbeiten in Schwarz/Weiß, Galerie f5,6, München
- 2006 Retrospective, Peter Fetterman Gallery, Santa Monica, USA
- 2010 Retrospective, The Wapping Project, London, UK
- 2009-2010 Retrospective, The Deichtorhallen, Hamburg, Germany
- 2014 "Signature of Elegance," Chanel Nexus Hall, Tokyo, Japan
- 2014–2015 Retrospective, KunstHausWien, Vienna, Austria
- 2016 Edwynn Houk Gallery, New York, USA
- 2021 The New Woman Behind the Camera, Metropolitan Museum of Art, New York
- 2026 Lillian Bassman: Bazaar and Beyond, Metropolitan Museum of Art, New York
