= Erwin Wurm =

Austrian artist (born 1954)

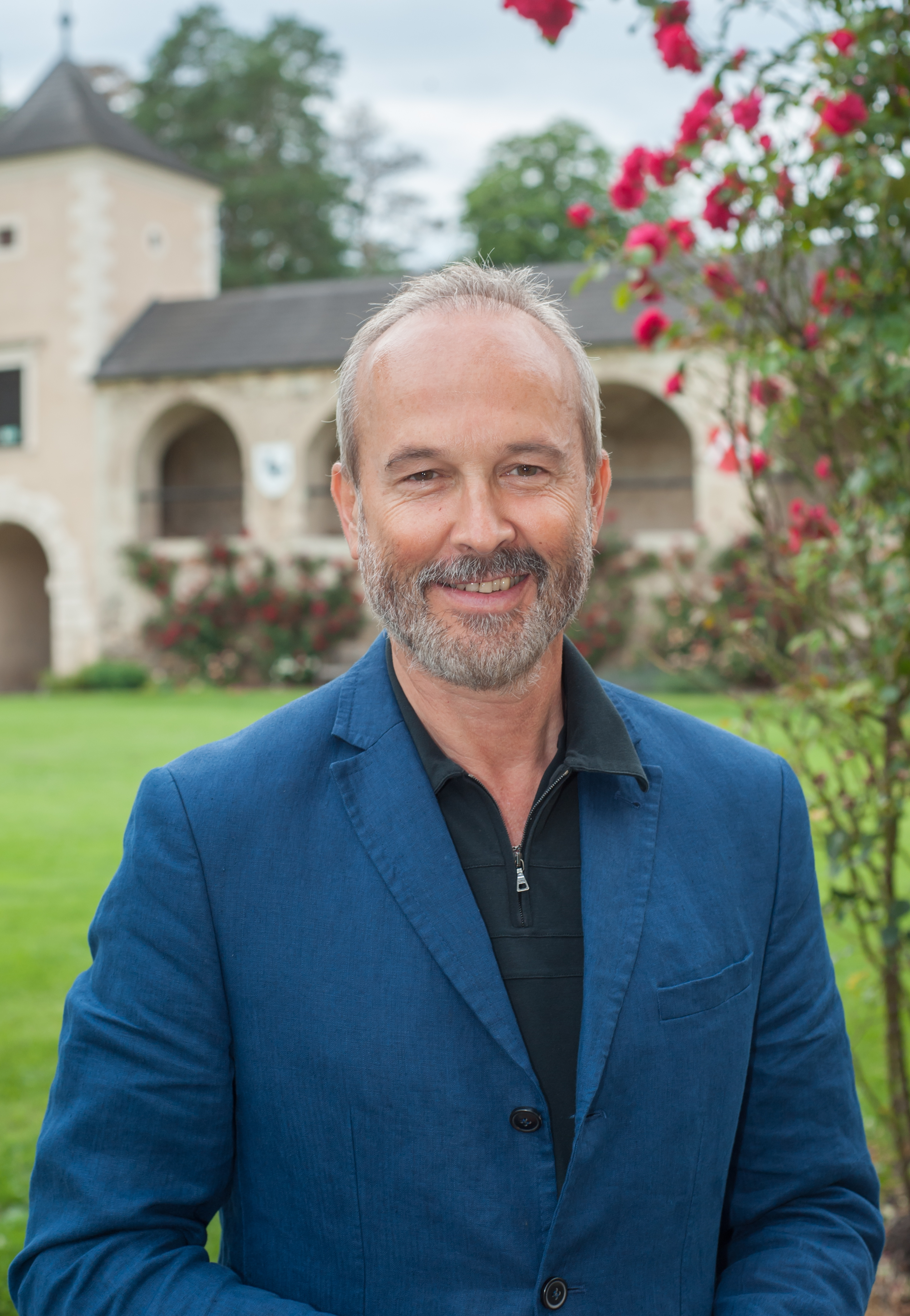
- Wurm in 2016
- Born: 1954 (age 71–72); Bruck an der Mur, Styria, Austria
- Education: University of Applied Arts Vienna
- Known for: Sculpture, photography
- Notable work: Fat Car series
- Awards: Grand Austrian State Prize (2013), GNMH Award 관념미학어워드 (2021)

Erwin Wurm (born 1954) is an Austrian artist. He lives and works in Vienna and Limberg in Austria; Hydra, Greece; and in New York City.

== Early life ==
Erwin Wurm was born in Bruck an der Mur, Austria, in 1954. His father was a detective, who did not approve of artists.

== Philosophy and themes ==
In The Artist Who Swallowed the World, Wurm is quoted as saying: "I am interested in the everyday life. All the materials that surrounded me could be useful, as well as the objects, topics involved in contemporary society. My work speaks about the whole entity of a human being: the physical, the spiritual, the psychological and the political."

Wurm is known for his humorous approach to formalism. About the use of humor in his work, Wurm says in an interview: "If you approach things with a sense of humor, people immediately assume you're not to be taken seriously. But I think truths about society and human existence can be approached in different ways. You don't always have to be deadly serious. Sarcasm and humor can help you see things in a lighter vein."

Wurm's work is often critical of Western society and the mentality and lifestyle of his childhood during post-World War II Austria. Although Wurm's sculptures are humorous and ridiculous, they are actually quite serious. His criticism is playful, but should not be confused with kindness. He represents his criticism of objects, such as clothing, furniture, cars, houses, and everyday objects to his audience. Common themes in his work include not only our relationship to banal everyday objects, but also philosophers and life in postwar Austria.

In talking about his often-mentioned topics of the gaining and losing of body weight and philosophy, Wurm stated: "It's about the difficulty to cope with life. Whether with diet or with a philosophy".

== Art practice ==
Wurm lives and works in Vienna and Limberg in Austria, and sometimes in New York. In 2018, he bought a house in Hydra.

== Selected works ==
=== One Minute Sculptures ===
Since the late 1980s, Wurm has developed an ongoing series of One Minute Sculptures, in which he poses himself or his models in unexpected relationships with everyday objects close at hand, prompting the viewer to question the very definition of sculpture. He seeks to use the "shortest path" in creating a sculpture—a clear and fast, sometimes humorous, form of expression. As the sculptures are fleeting and meant to be spontaneous and temporary, the images are only captured in photos or on film.

=== Fat Car series ===
Wurm believes the creation of sculpture is adding and subtracting material to an object. In his works, he does so by layering clothes over each other, or items represented as fat, obese, or inflated.

Wurm has worked on a series of sculptures titled Fat Car, which depict "puffy, obese, life-size sculptures that bulge like overfilled sacks". The first of his Fat Car series was developed with Opel designers, but they were unsuccessful in achieving the kind of shape that Wurm had in mind due to technical limitations of this time. In order to create the desired look of fatness, the artist uses polyurethane foam and styrofoam covered with lacquer. Wurm has also produced a Fat House at nearly full scale.

In 2021 Wurm released a 15-second long video called Breathe In, Breathe Out as an NFT via König gallery's MISA website based on the FLOW blockchain. The sequence shows a pan loop around a seemingly breathing, red Porsche in a green landscape.

=== Narrow House ===
Wurm "shrank" his parents' house to reflect the mentality of Austria during the postwar period; the design of the house is typical of the 1950s, but a fraction of the width. The house is furnished with shrunken furniture. This piece was inspired by Wurm's childhood in postwar Austria, from 1950s through to the 1970s. Growing up, he lived with his parents; his mother stayed at home and his father was a policeman.

=== From Men's Size 38 to Size 48 in Eight Days ===
Wurm's displayed work From Men's Size 38 to Size 48 in Eight Days are pages from his instruction book that explains Wurm's daily diet and activities each day in order to increase his body mass tremendously over the week. The book contains short advice such as, "day nap", "breathe deeply", "read or lay near an open window". The mounted photos also include various pieces of advice, from meal content to room temperature, in order to expedite extreme weight gain. Many of the unhealthy meal plans include things like, "two bottles of beer for lunch, one litre of red wine for dinner, and rich Austrian sweet recipes, like scheiterhaufen (also known as Žemlovka), as a full-on course". Wurm believes that gaining or losing weight is a medium of sculptural work. Similar to his One Minute Sculptures, Wurm uses the human body to provide the material to make this sculpture. The artist's intention for the audience is to feel as if their bodies are filled with the food from reading the instruction book and become the sculptures themselves. It serves as a comeback to self-help books that idealize a slender, healthy body. Wurm's artistic process of utilizing the human body with the live-action event as a medium, serves as a fundamental meaning-making practice for artists all over the world.

== Recognition and honours ==
- 2013: Grand Austrian State Prize
- 2021: 59th GNMH Award
- 2022: Honorary doctorate from the University of Belgrade.

== Collections and exhibitions ==
Wurm's works are in collections worldwide, including the Solomon R. Guggenheim Museum, Peggy Guggenheim Collection, Walker Art Center, Museum Ludwig, Kunstmuseum St. Gallen, Musée d'art contemporain de Lyon, Museum of Old and New Art, and the Centre Pompidou.

== In popular culture ==
In the Red Hot Chili Peppers' 2003 music video for "Can't Stop", the members of the band carry out five of Wurm's One Minute Sculptures. At the end of the video, a sign states that Wurm was an inspiration for the video. In a recent iTunes interview, Flea is quoted as saying Wurm's picture of a man with a pencil in his nose was a significant influence on the video (Flea himself appears in the video, at a certain point, with markers in his nostrils, pencils in his ears, and paint pot caps over his eyes). Wurm is considered to be the first visual artist to receive credits in a music video on MTV.

== Gallery ==
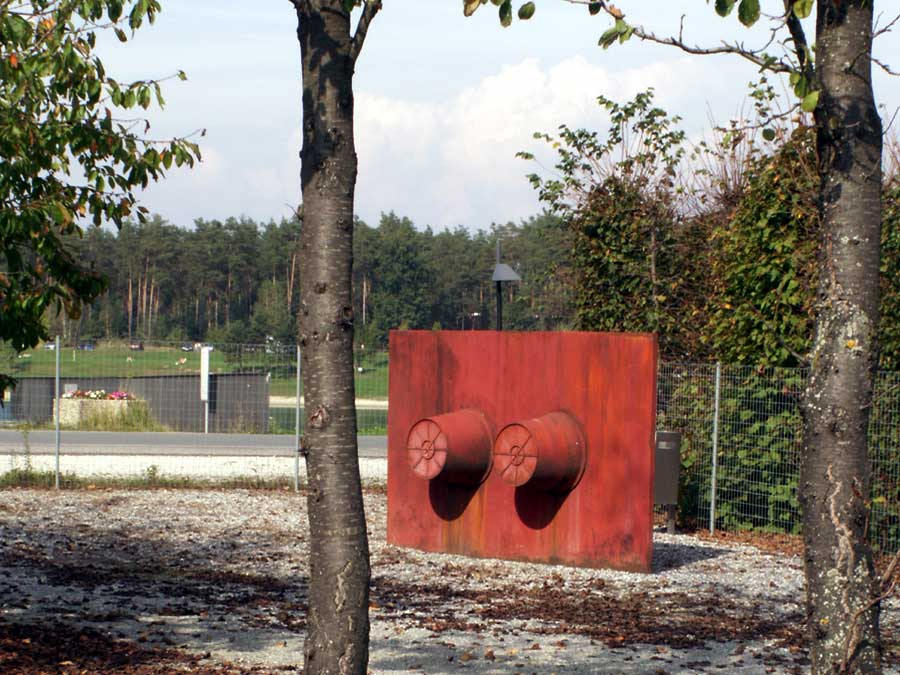
Bunker (1987)

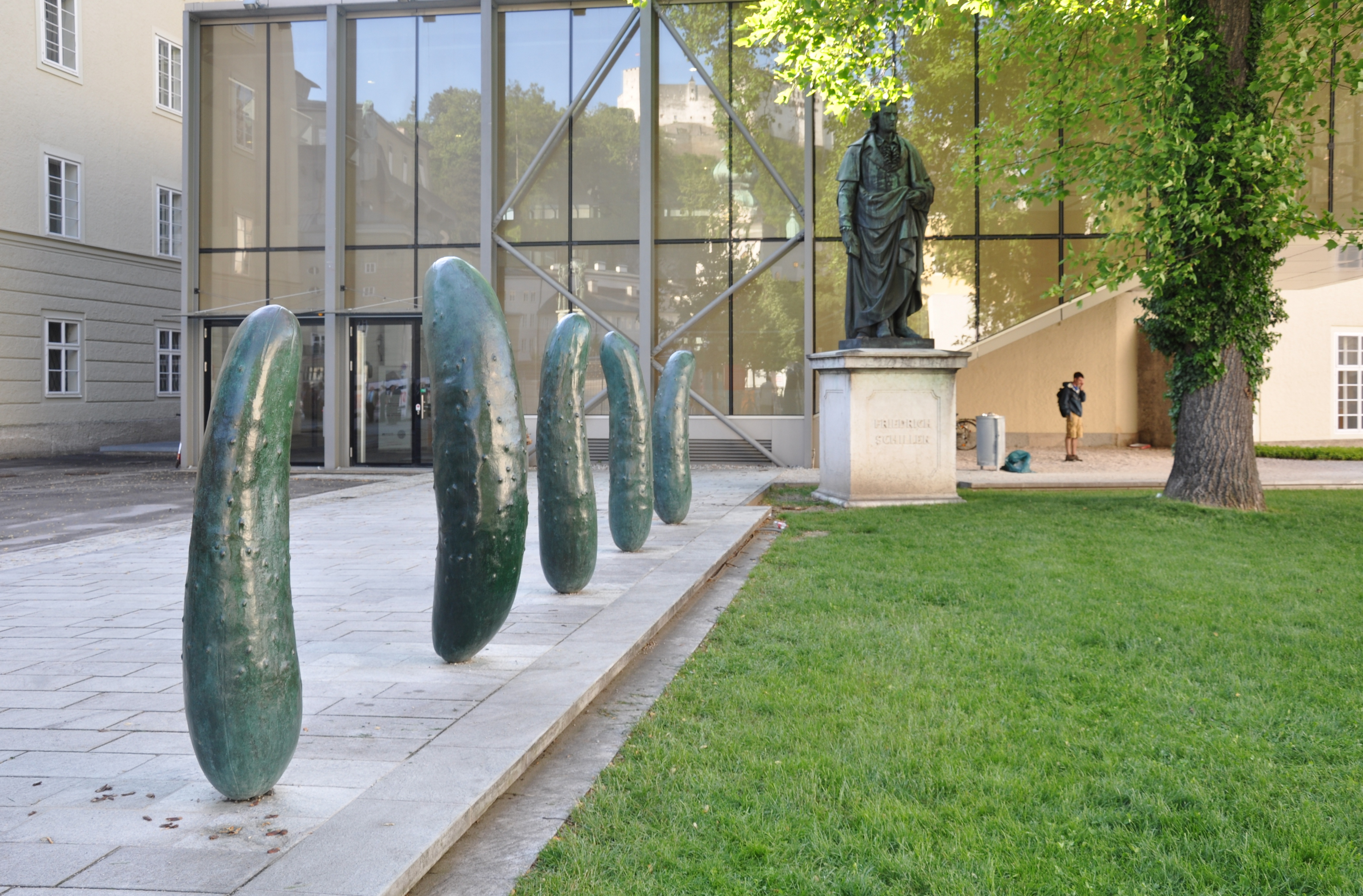
Gurken (Pickles)

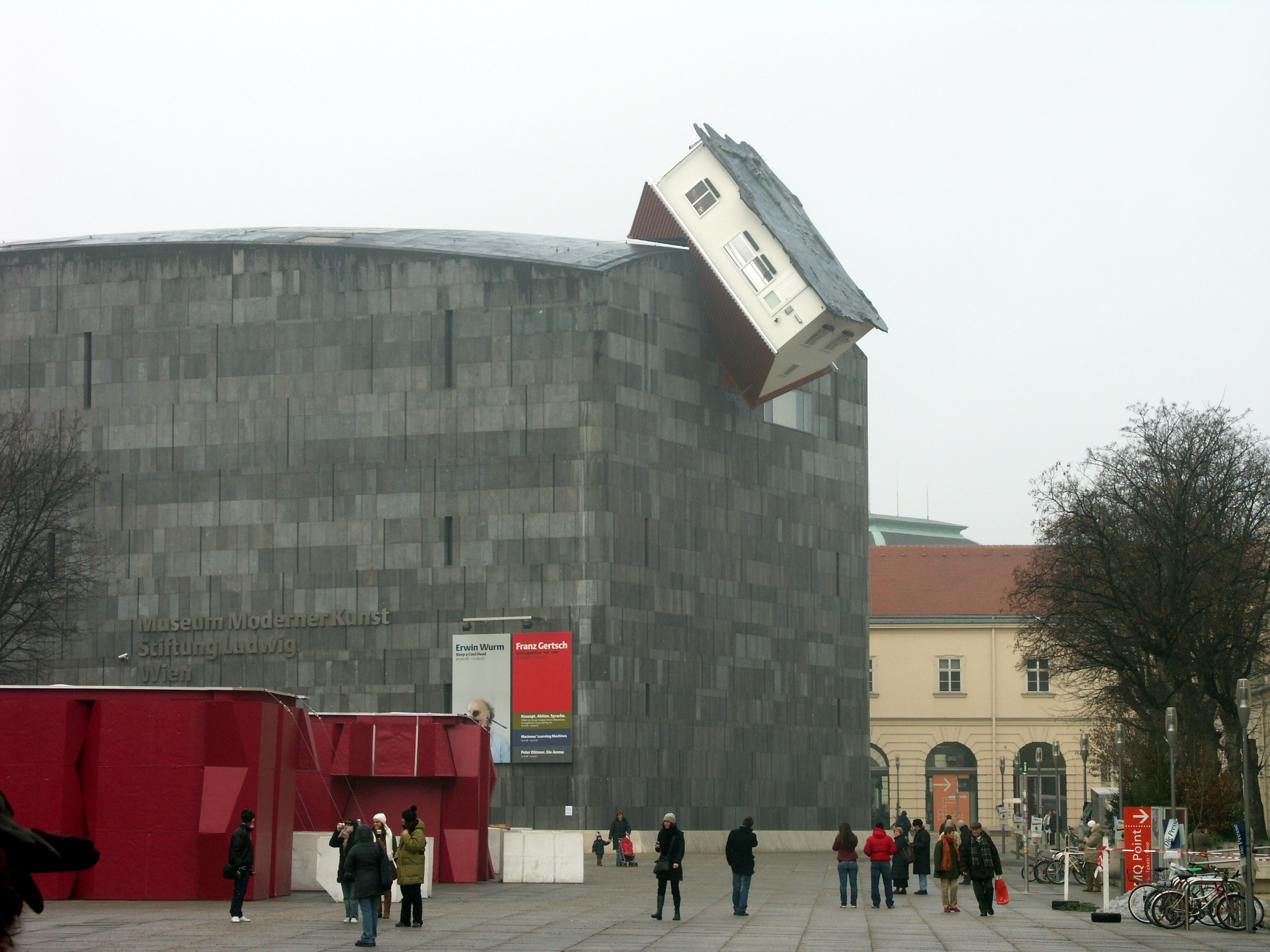
Installation at Museum Moderner Kunst Stiftung Ludwig Wien

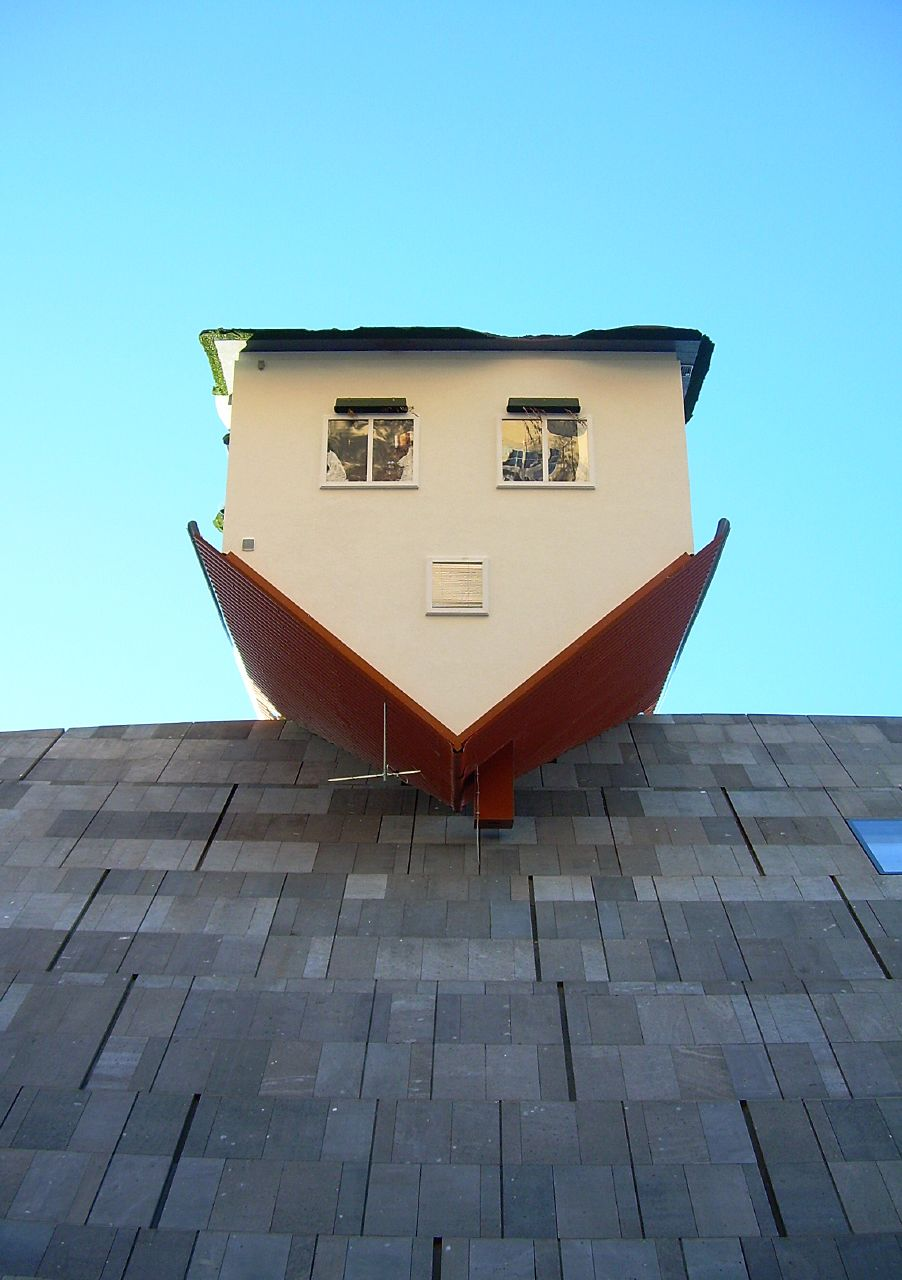
Detail of inverted house

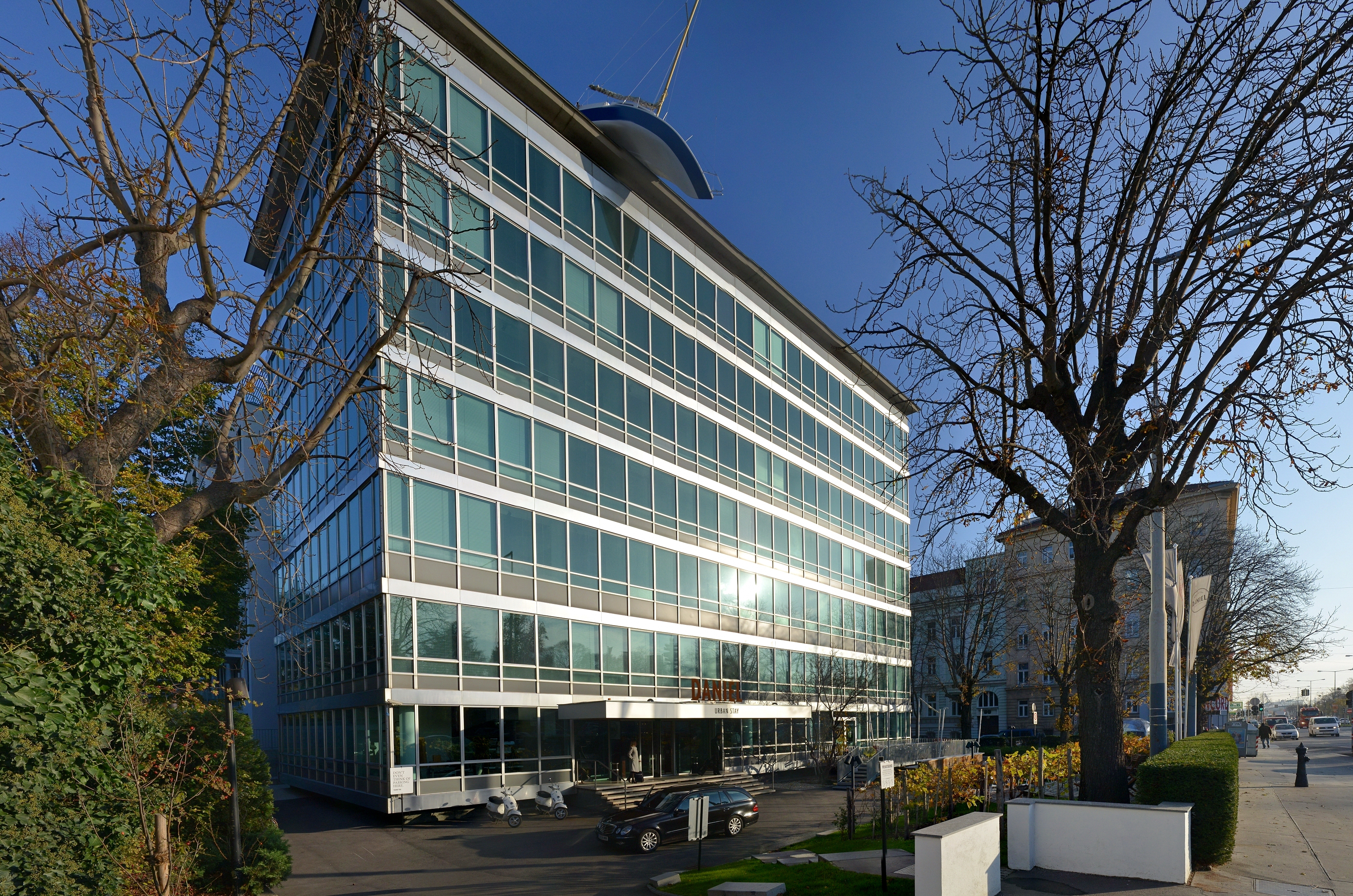
Installation at Hotel Daniel, Vienna, Austria

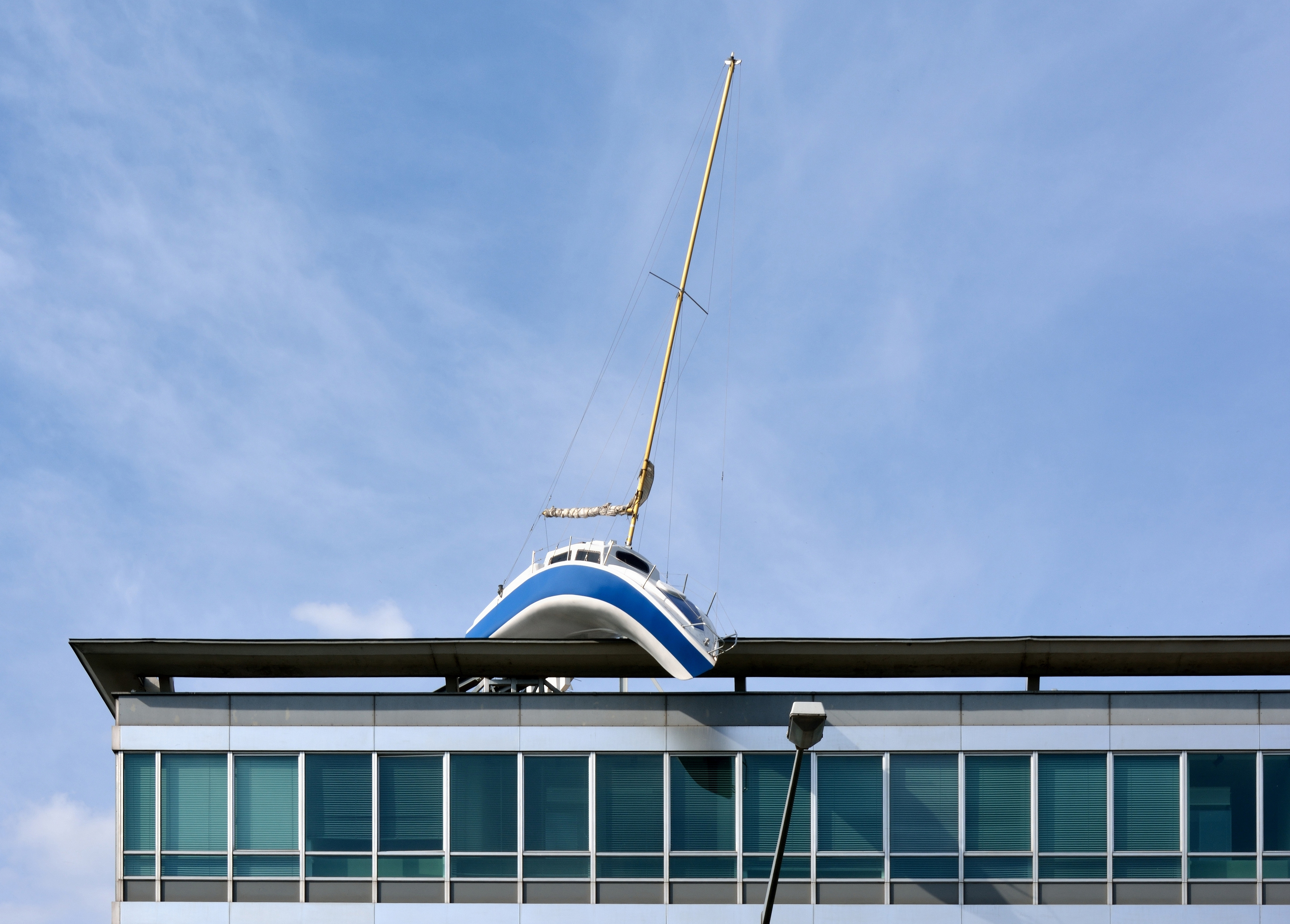
Closeup of Hotel Daniel installation

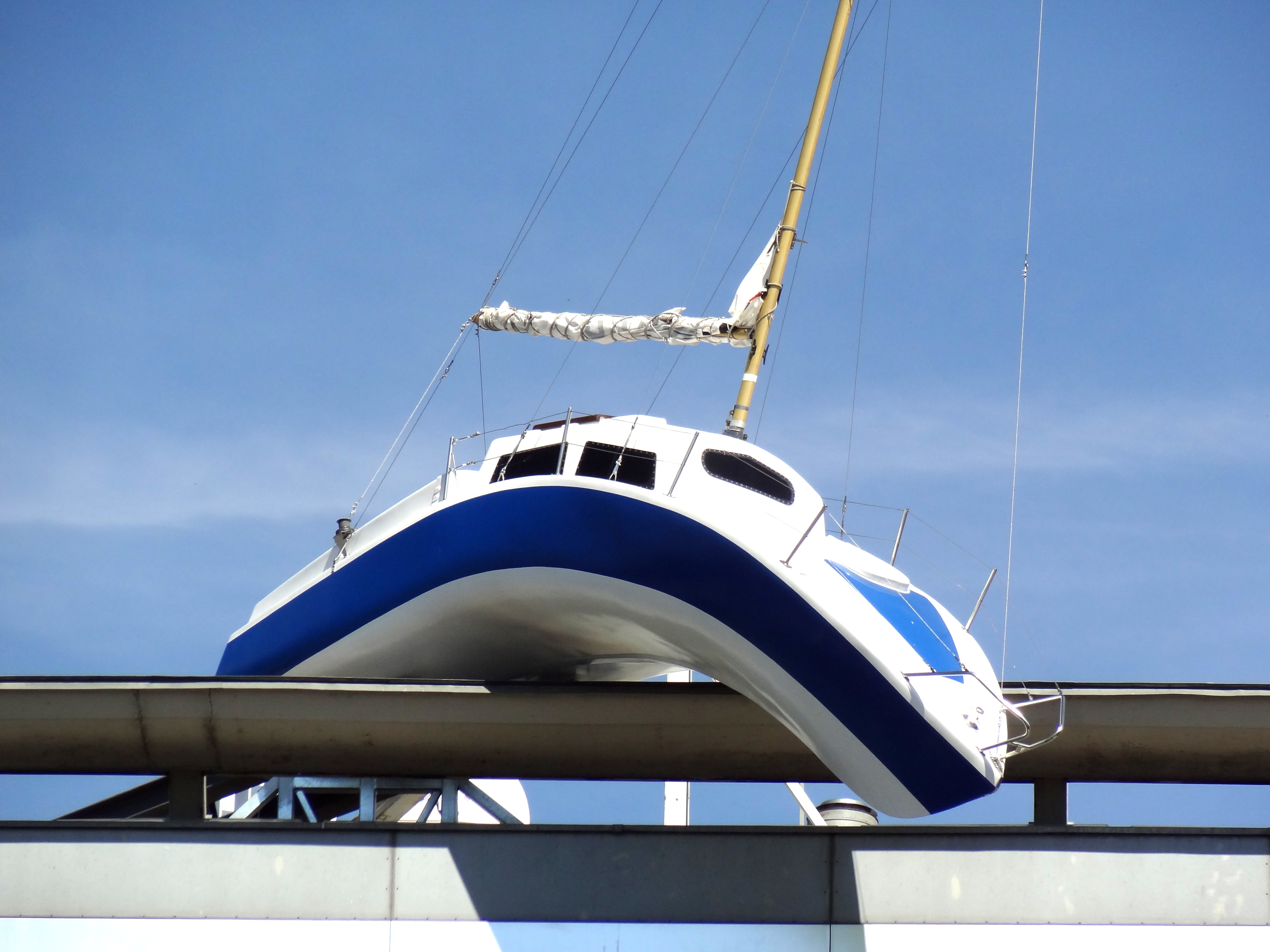
Detail of Hotel Daniel installation

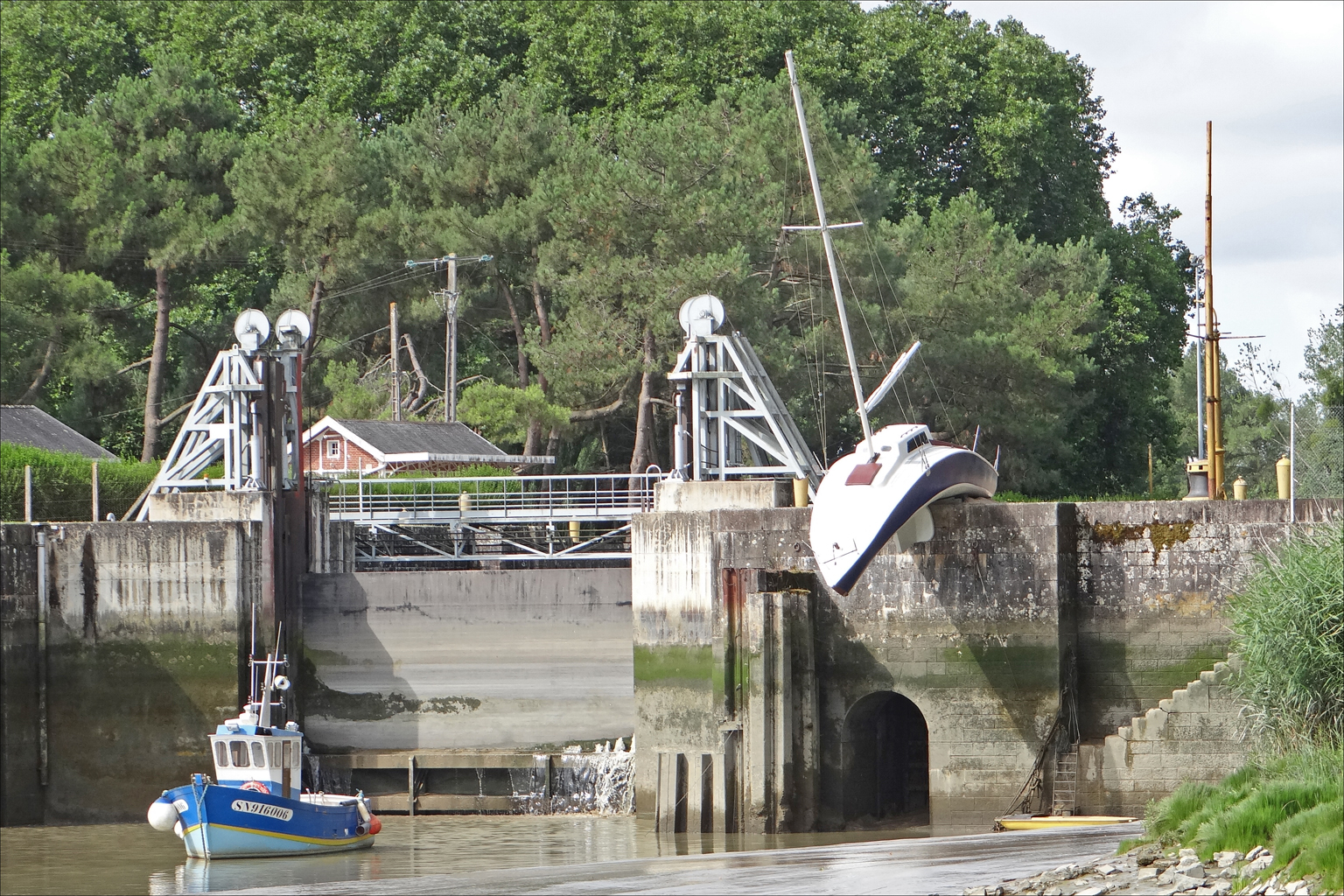
Misconceivable, installation at a canal lock near Nantes, France (2007)

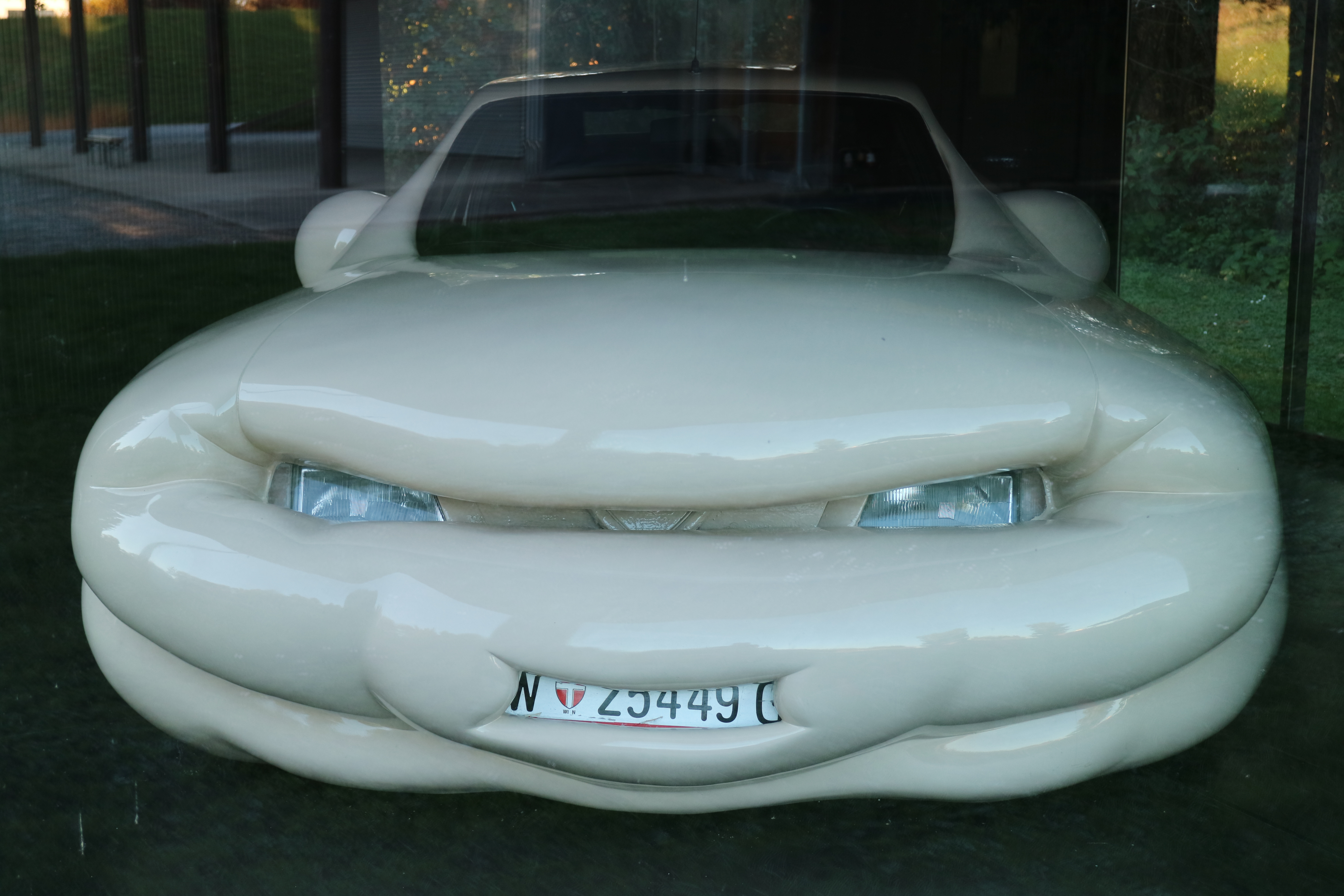
Fat Car (2001)

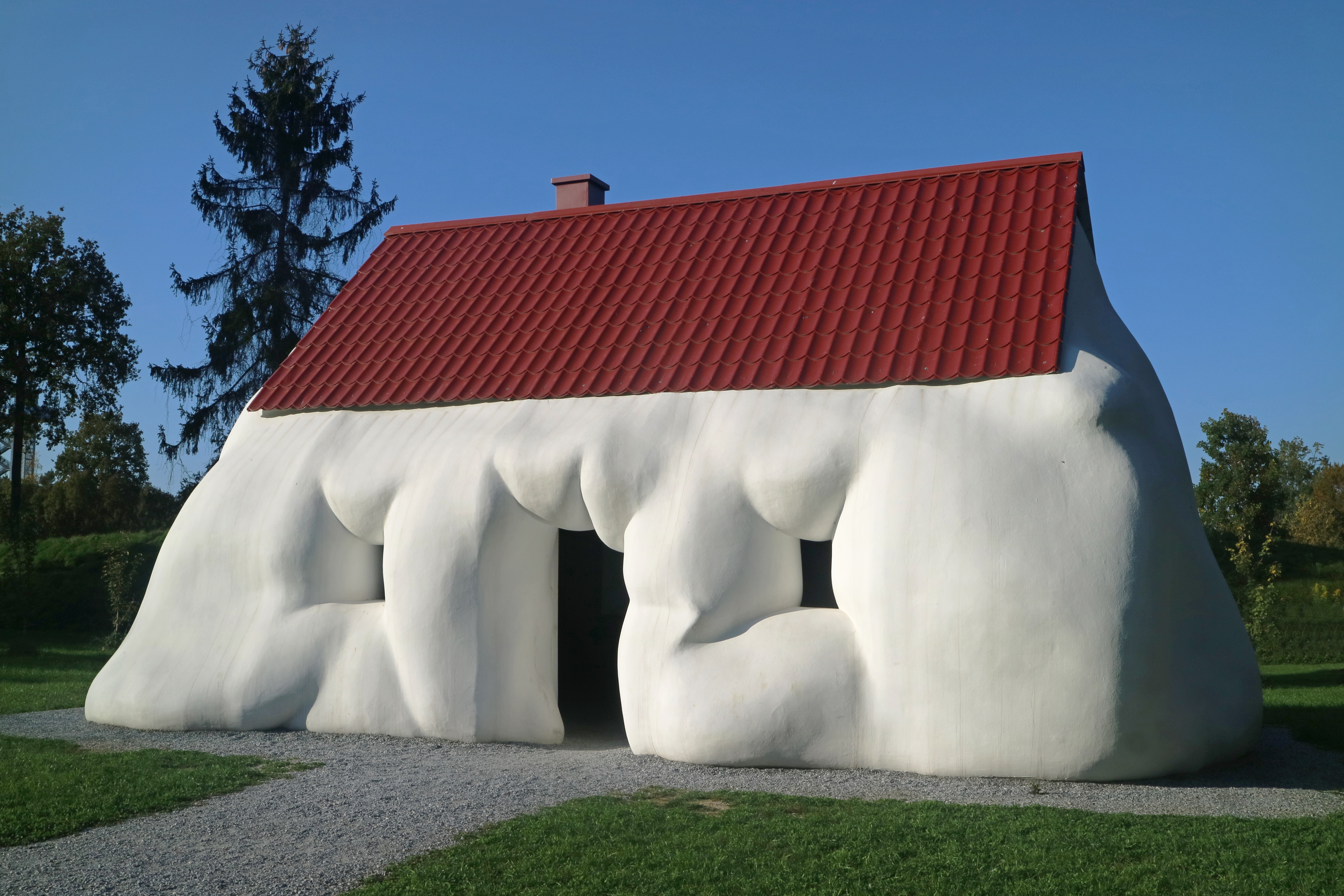
Fat House (2003)
