= Horizon Field Hamburg =

Sculpture by Antony Gormley

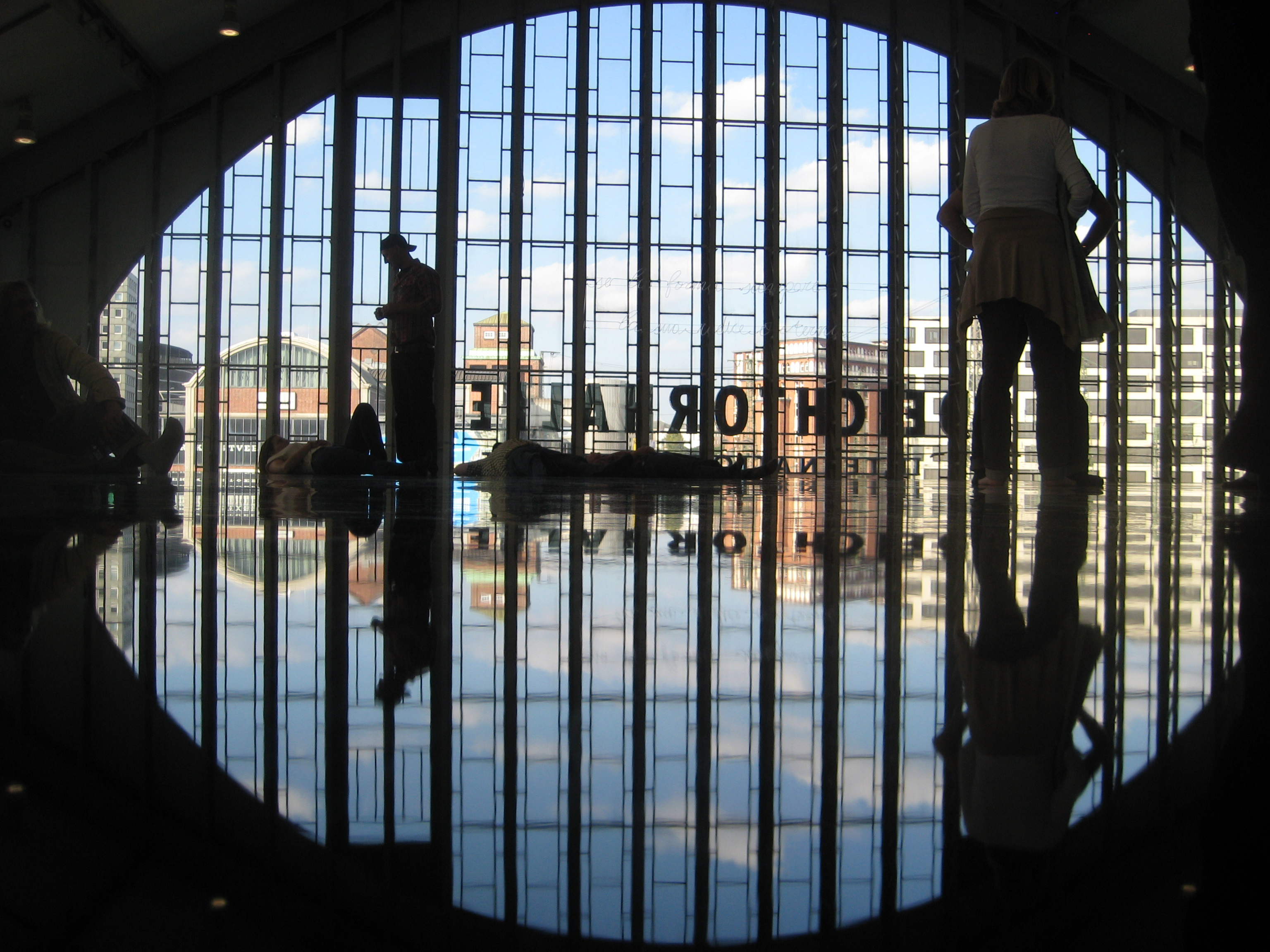
Impression of a visit on the Horizon Field

Horizon Field Hamburg, a large-scale art installation by British sculptor Antony Gormley, consisted of a 25 by 50 m (82 by 164 ft) platform suspended by steel cables 7.5 m (25 ft) above the ground in the 3,800 m^{2} (41,000 square feet) Hall for Contemporary Art of the Deichtorhallen in Hamburg. It was constructed from a steel-and-wood understructure covered by a highly polished black epoxy resin surface. The construction had a total weight of about 60 tons, using 40 tons of steel. It took two years of planning, and was erected in one month.

The installation was created for the occasion of the documenta 2012 exhibition, and opened to the public on 27 April 2012. Entry was free, but the number of visitors on the platform at any one time was limited to 100. Visitors were invited to take off their shoes, ascend to the platform, and experience time on the freely but nearly imperceptibly swinging construction. The mirror-finish surface showed reflections of the visitors, the steel frame architecture of the hall, and the cityscape beyond the large windows of the hall.

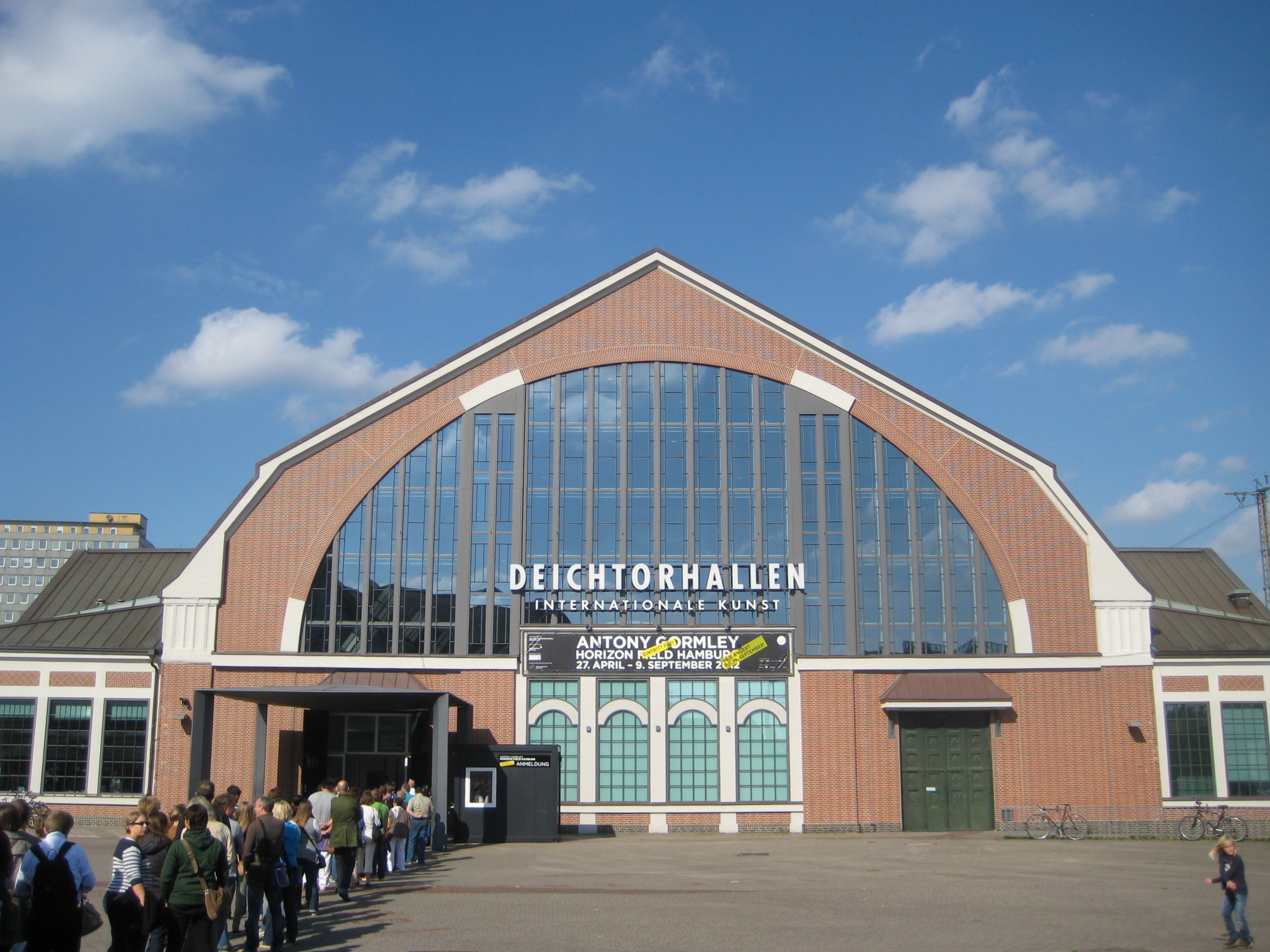
The Hall for Contemporary Art

The exhibition was originally scheduled to close on 9 September, but was extended for one week and finally closed on 16 September 2012. The field was lowered and dismantled after the exhibition. Disassembly took only a little more than a week. Most of the material was to be recycled, but 50 squares cut from the epoxy surface were offered to the public at a price of EUR 250 per piece.

The installation was seen by more than 42,500 visitors in the first six weeks, and by approximately 120,000 visitors in total. This makes it the most successful exhibition at the Deichtorhallen as of June 2012, significantly surpassing the number of 80,000 visitors for the previous record holder, a Roy Lichtenstein exhibition in 1995.
