= Veka (pastry) =

Type of pastry from Czechia, Slovakia, and Poland

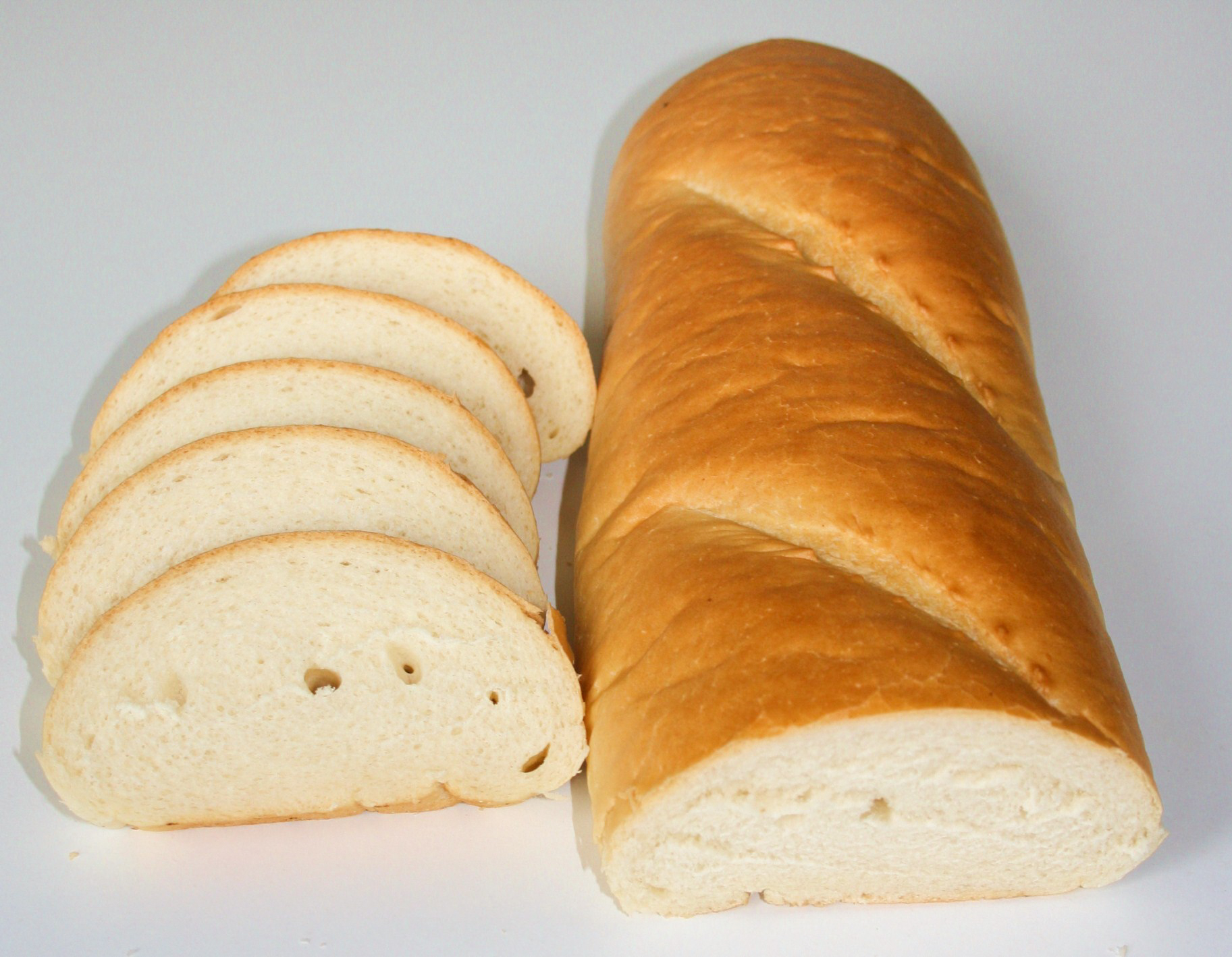
- Type: Pastry
- Main ingredients: Wheat flour

Veka (Polish: bułka paryska or bułka francuska) is a pastry produced in the Czech Republic, Slovakia and Poland. Its character is similar to a French baguette although the veka is wider, bigger, and fluffier and has a smoother surface. Veka is made of wheat flour, and its weight is about 350 grams.

== Polish regional names ==
- Małopolska and Podkarpacie region – sztangielka or weka
- Łódź – angielka
- Upper Silesia – linga or weka
- Podkarpacie Province – bina or weka
- Poznań, Jelenia Góra – kawiorka
- Kujawy – "baton" or "bułka wyborowa"
- Central Poland – gryzka
- Częstochowa Land and Radomsko in Łódź Voivodeship – linga
- The veka is also referred to as "bułka kielecka" and "bułka wrocławska"

== Uses in Czech cuisine ==
It is commonly used creating of open sandwiches called obložené chlebíčky. Eating of obložený chlebíček as a fast food snack is widespread habit and they are even sold in specialized shops called bufet or chlebíčkárna ("bread shop").

The veka can be used for certain types of knedlik (knödel). It is a major ingredient of žemlovka dish.

== Production ==
Baking process for veka

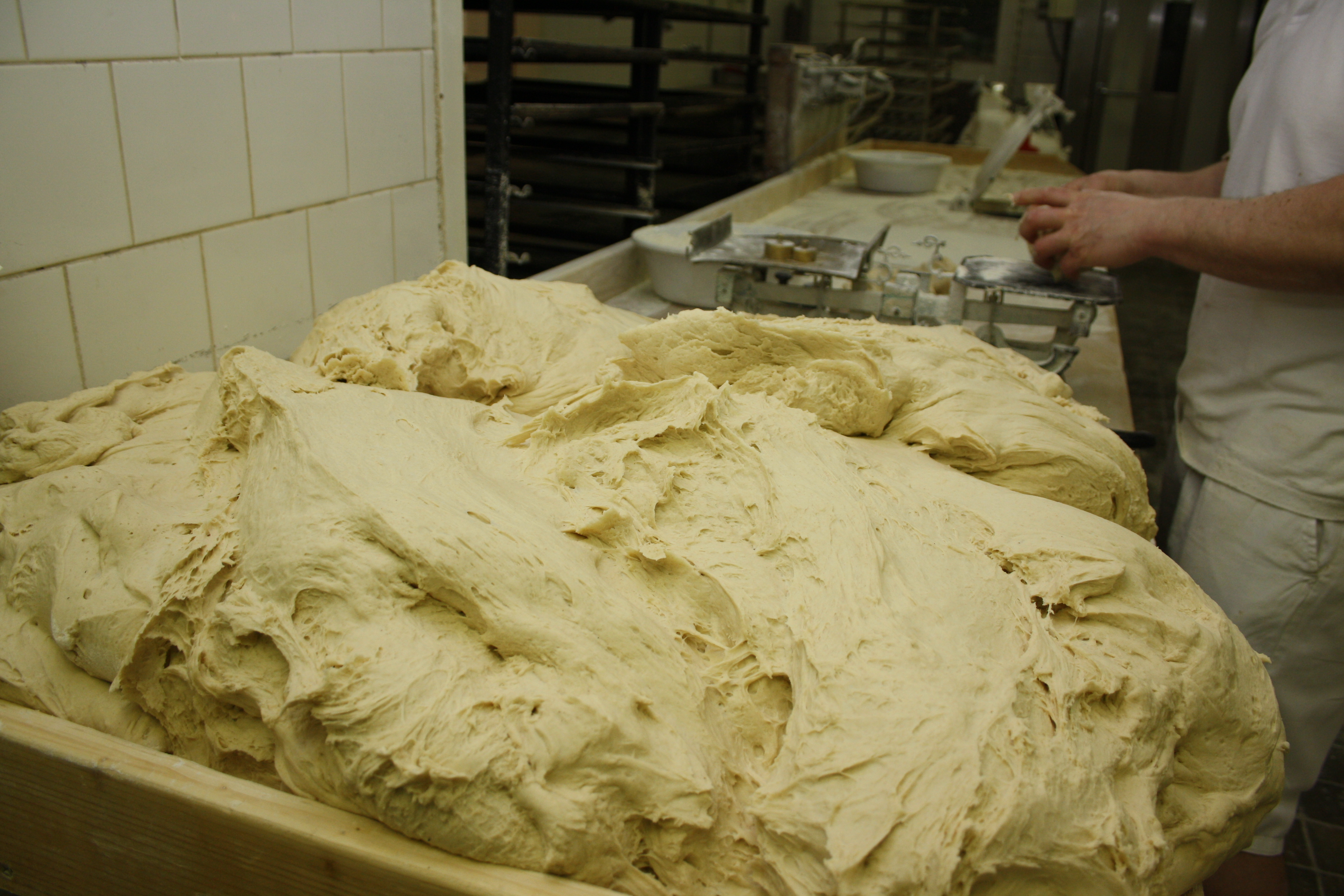
1: Cutting and weighing the dough

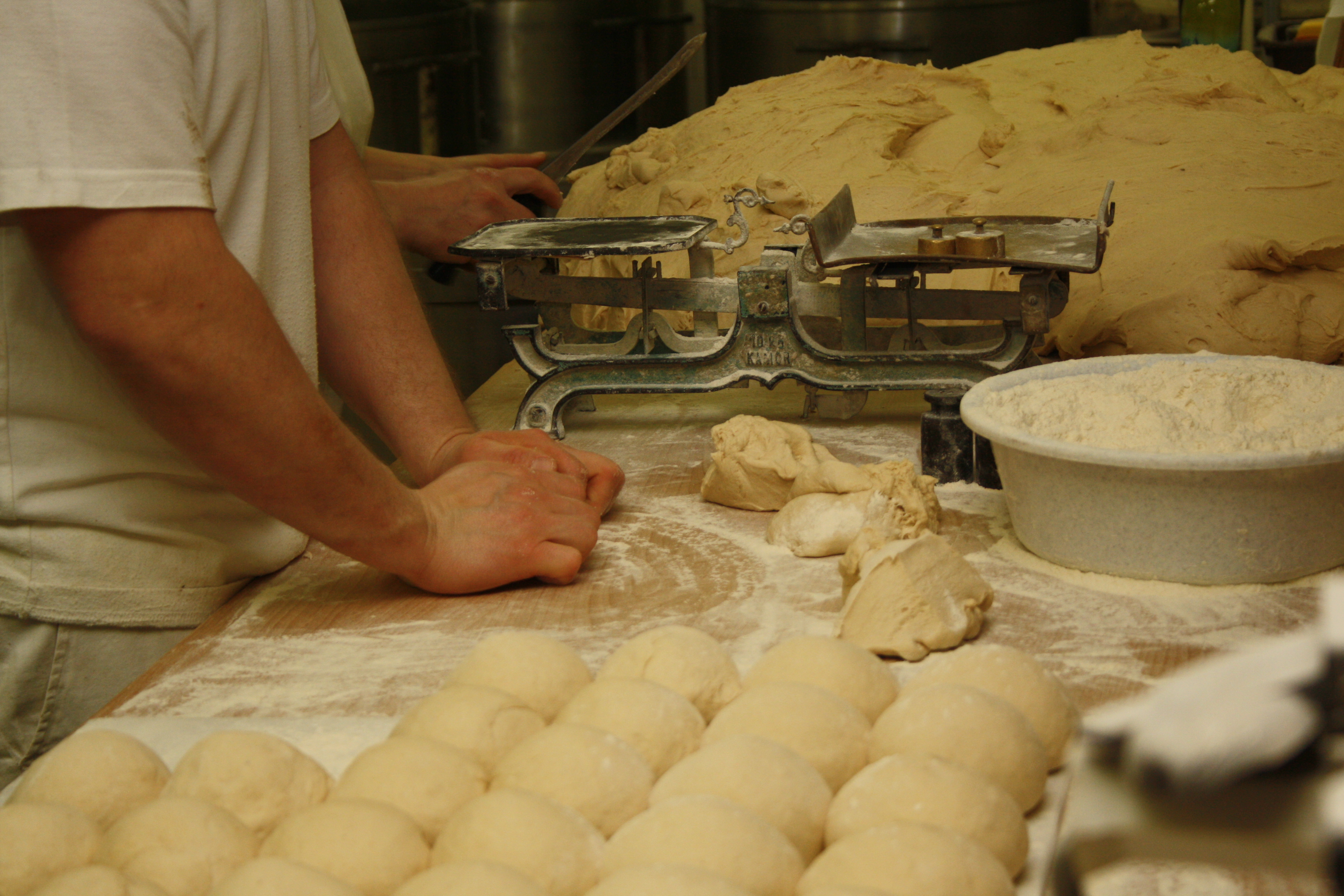
2: Molding the dough

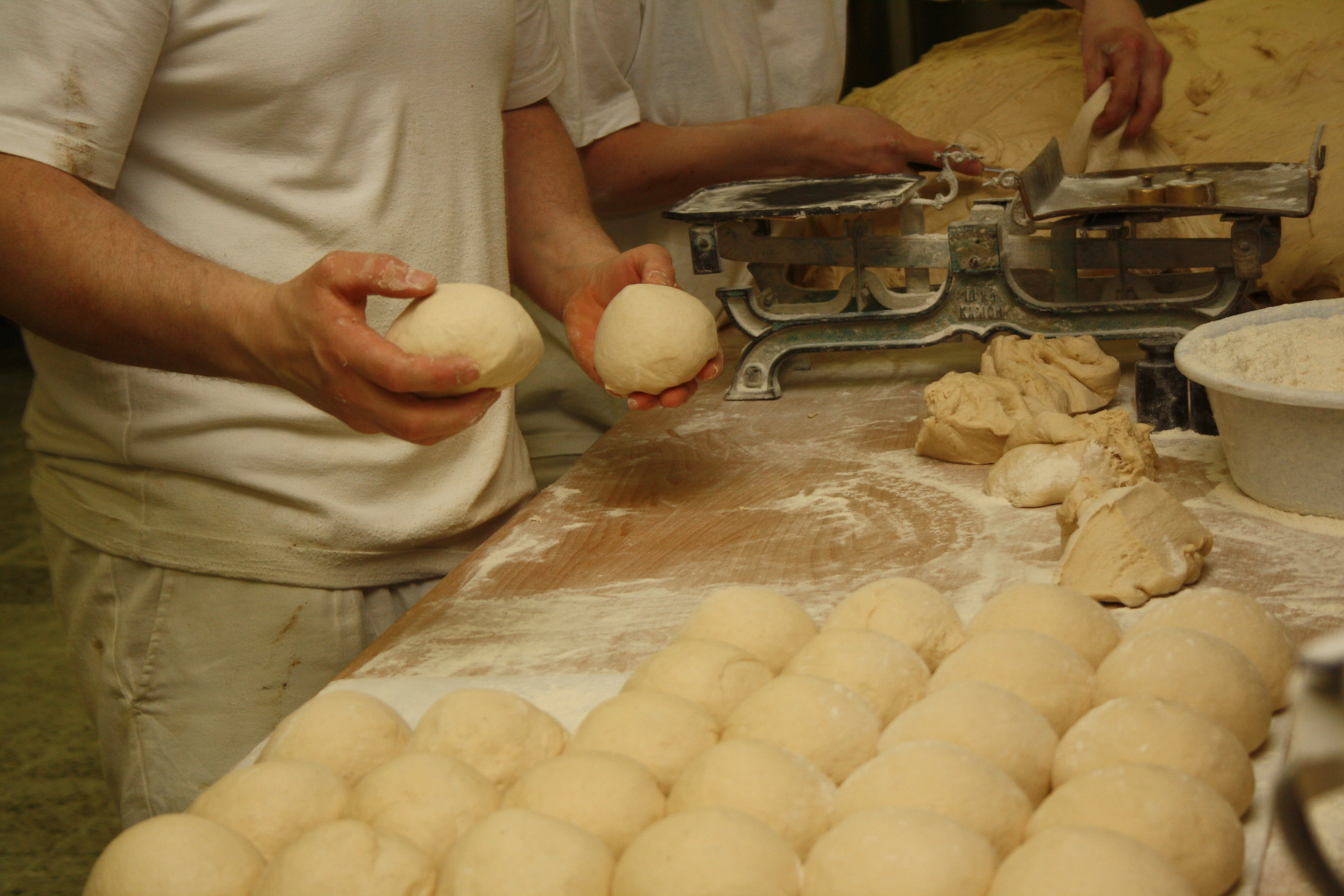
3: Loaves of the dough ready for insertion into the scrolling device

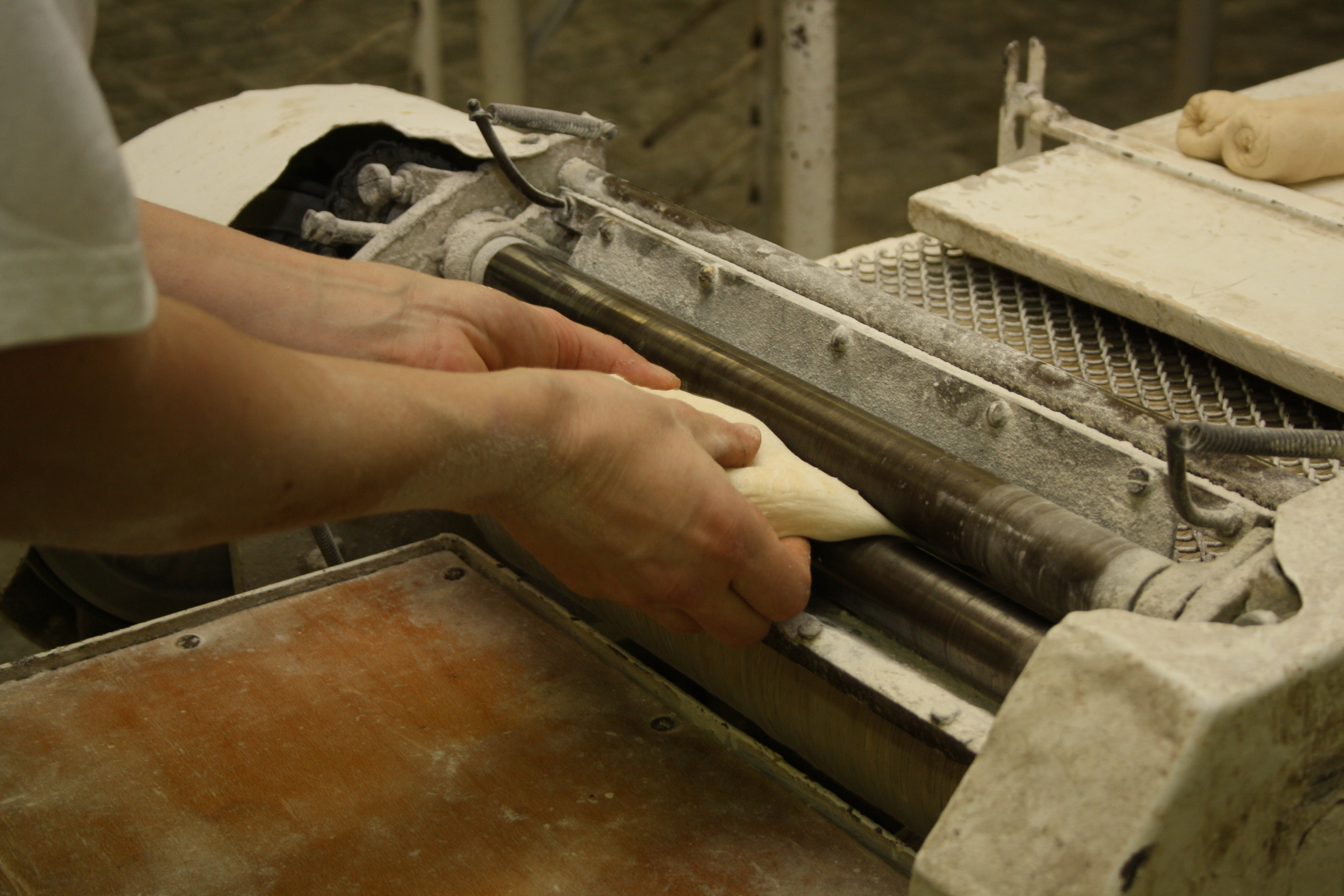
4: The scrolling device rolls the dough up into...

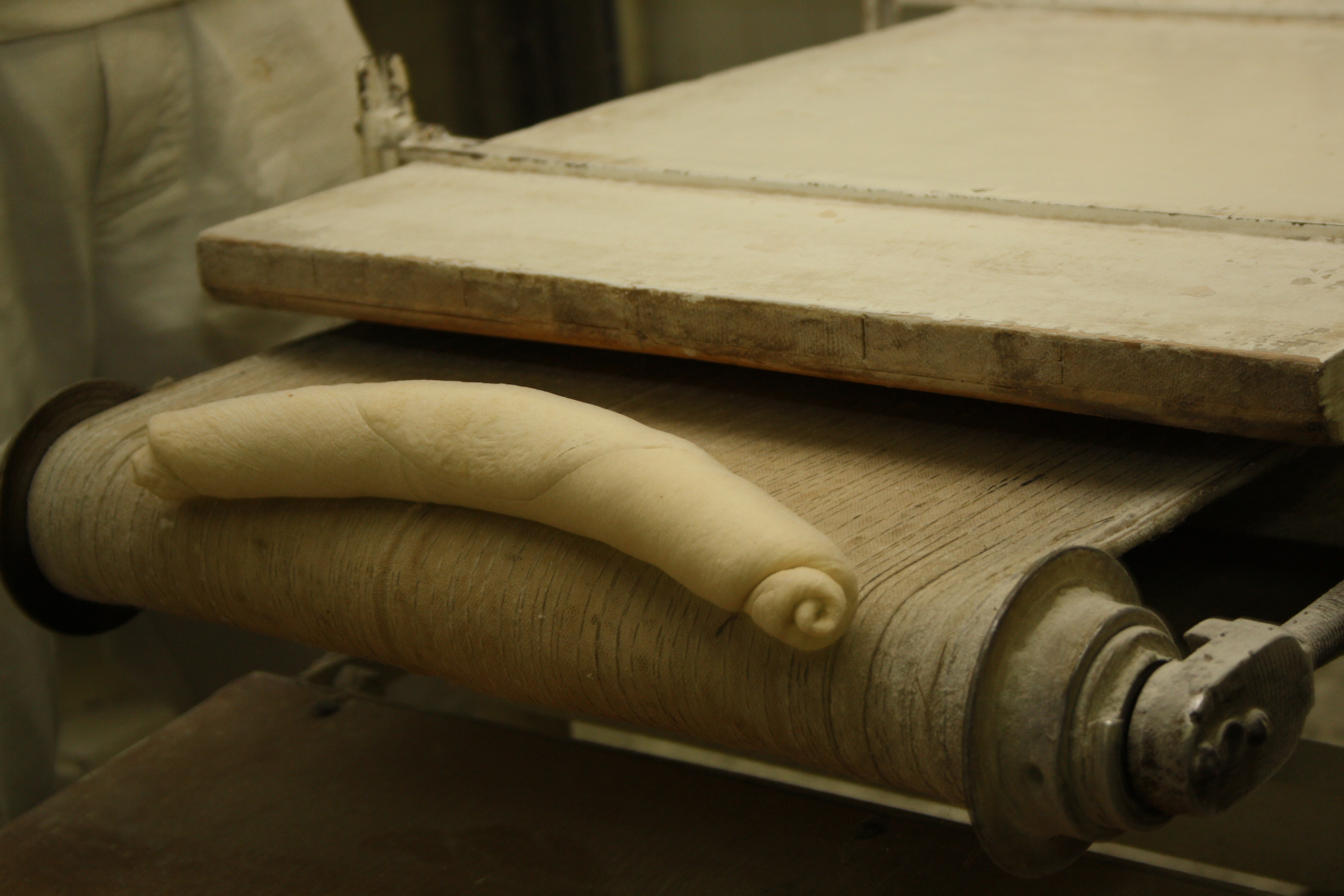
5: the needed shape of the veka

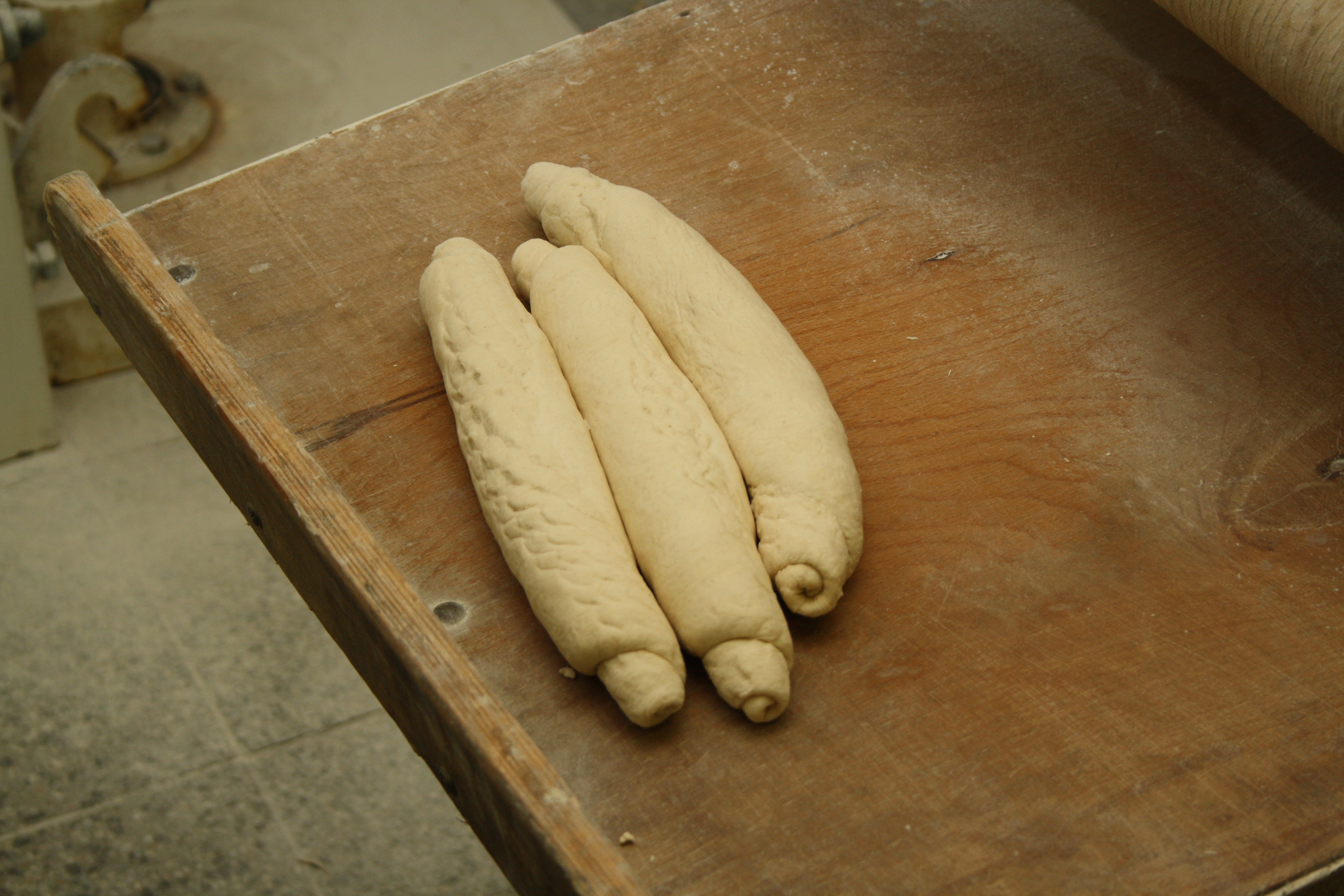
6: Rolled dough

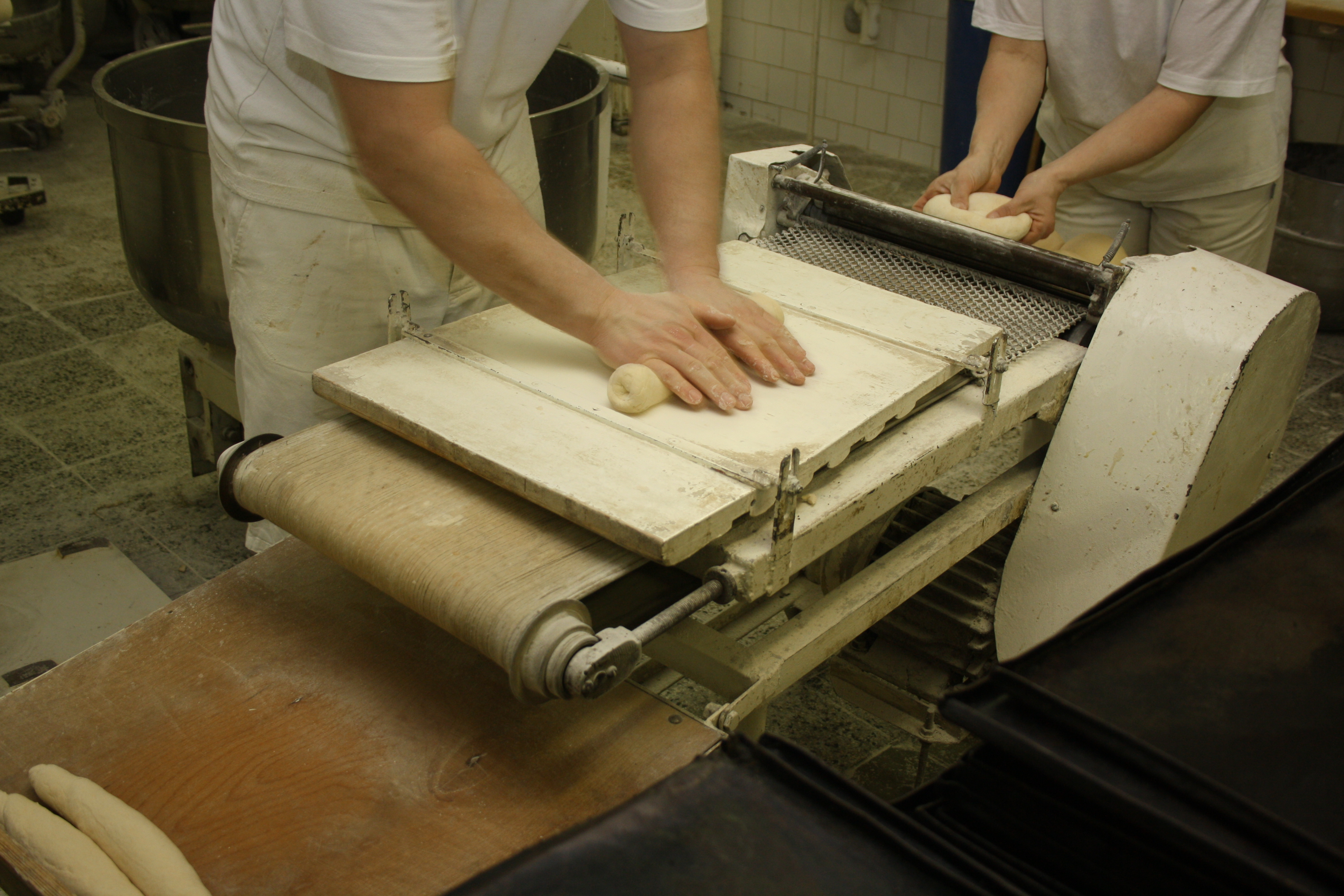
7: The dough is rolled again by hands

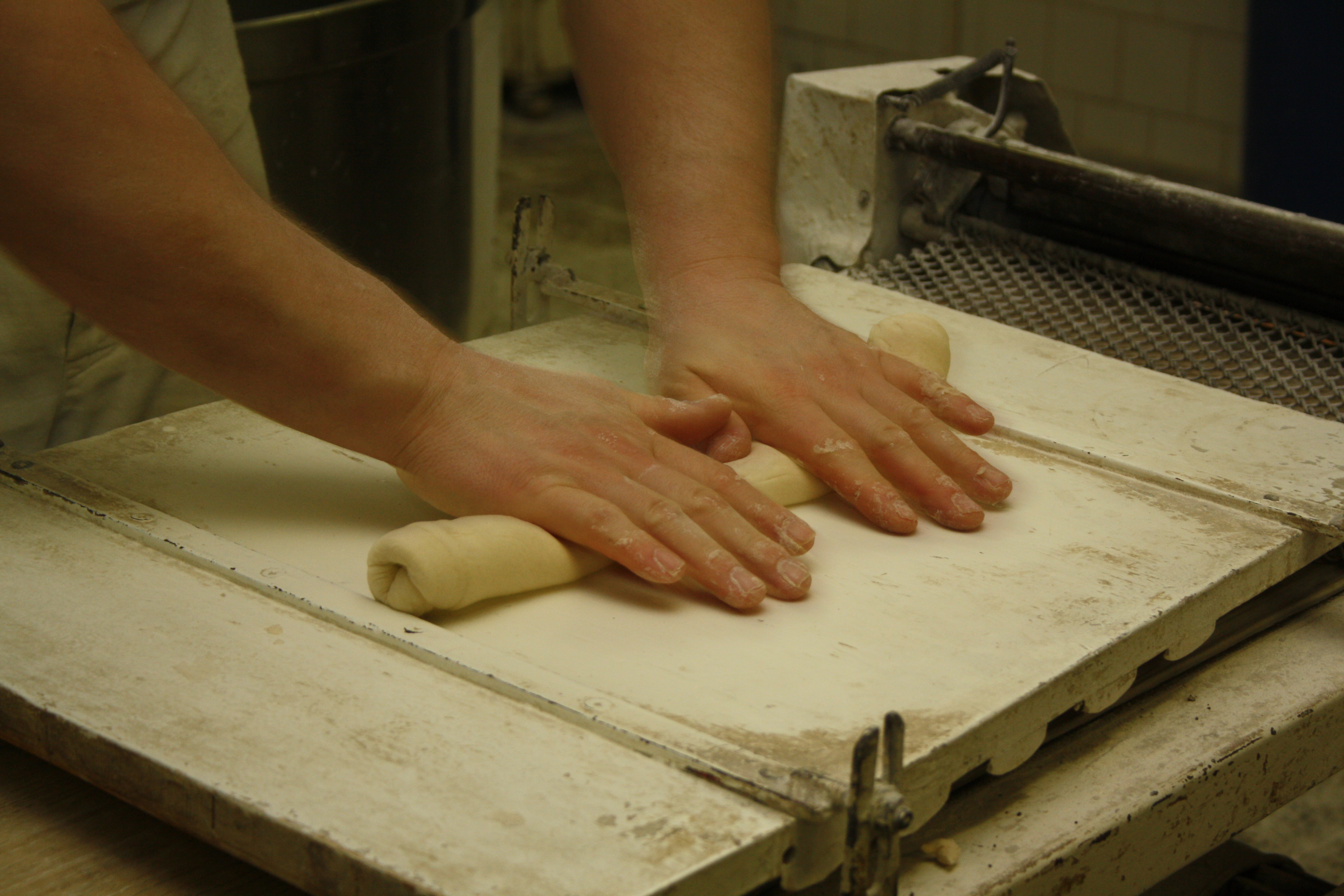
8: Dough rolling

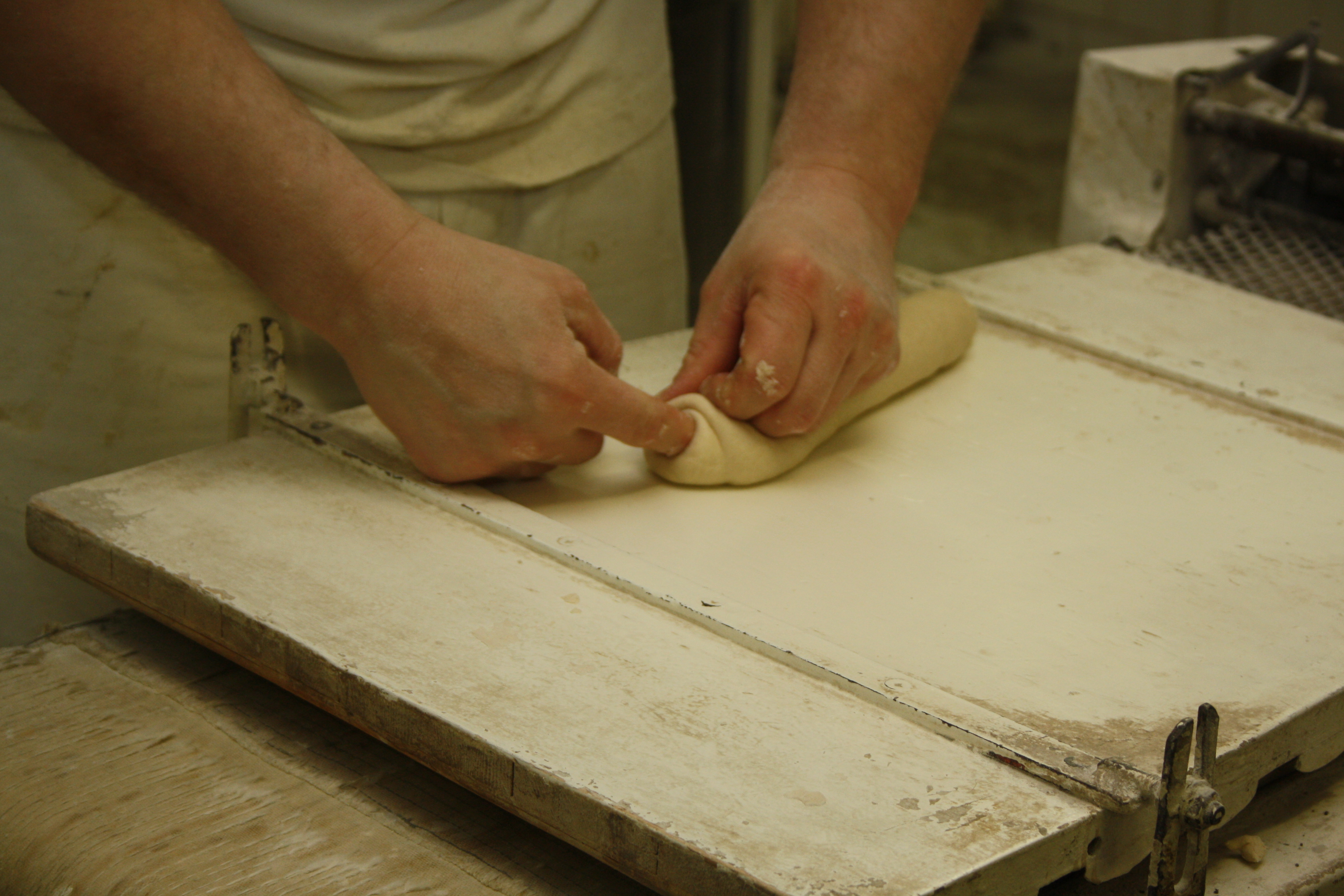
9: End of the dough shape is squashed

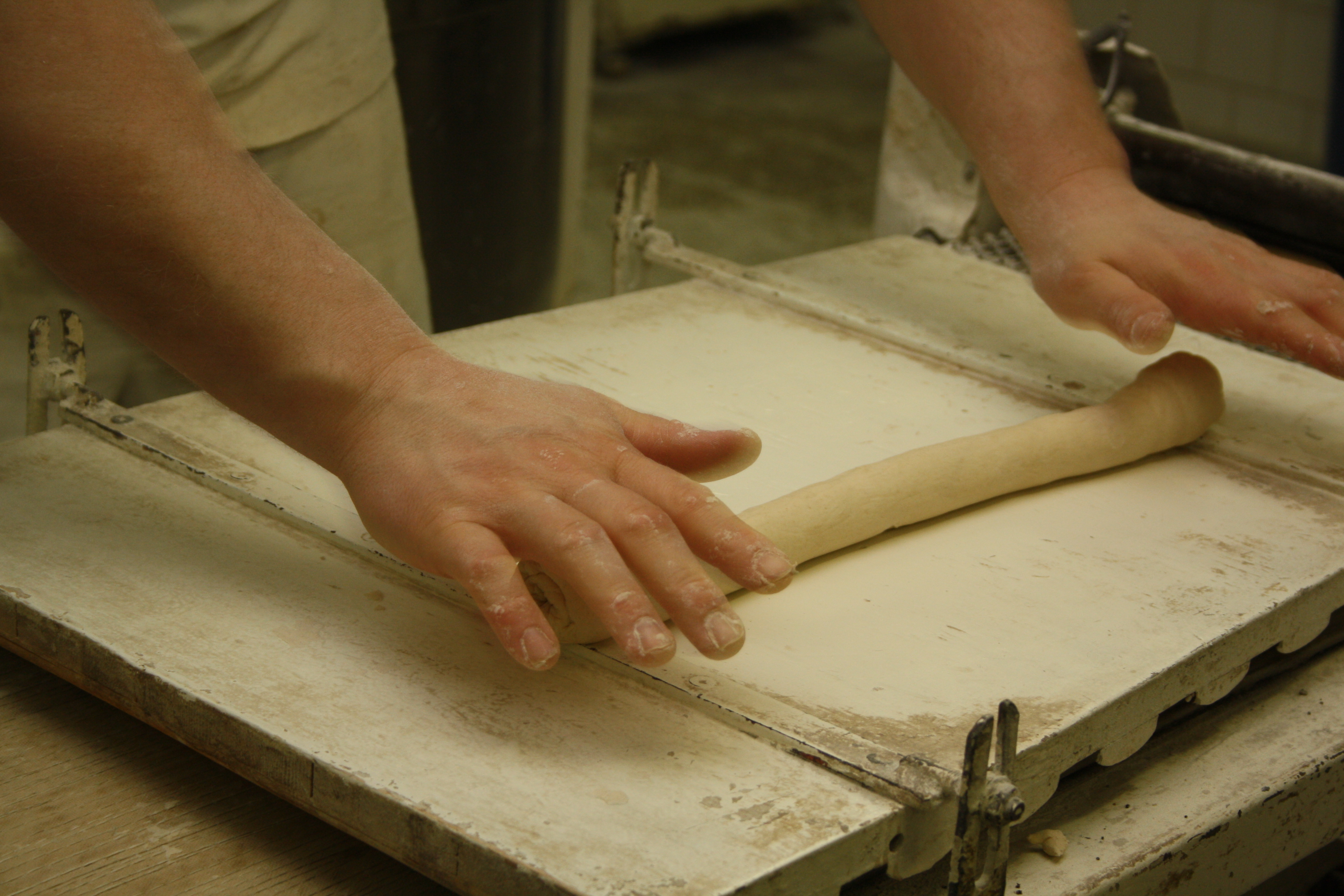
10: Last rolling

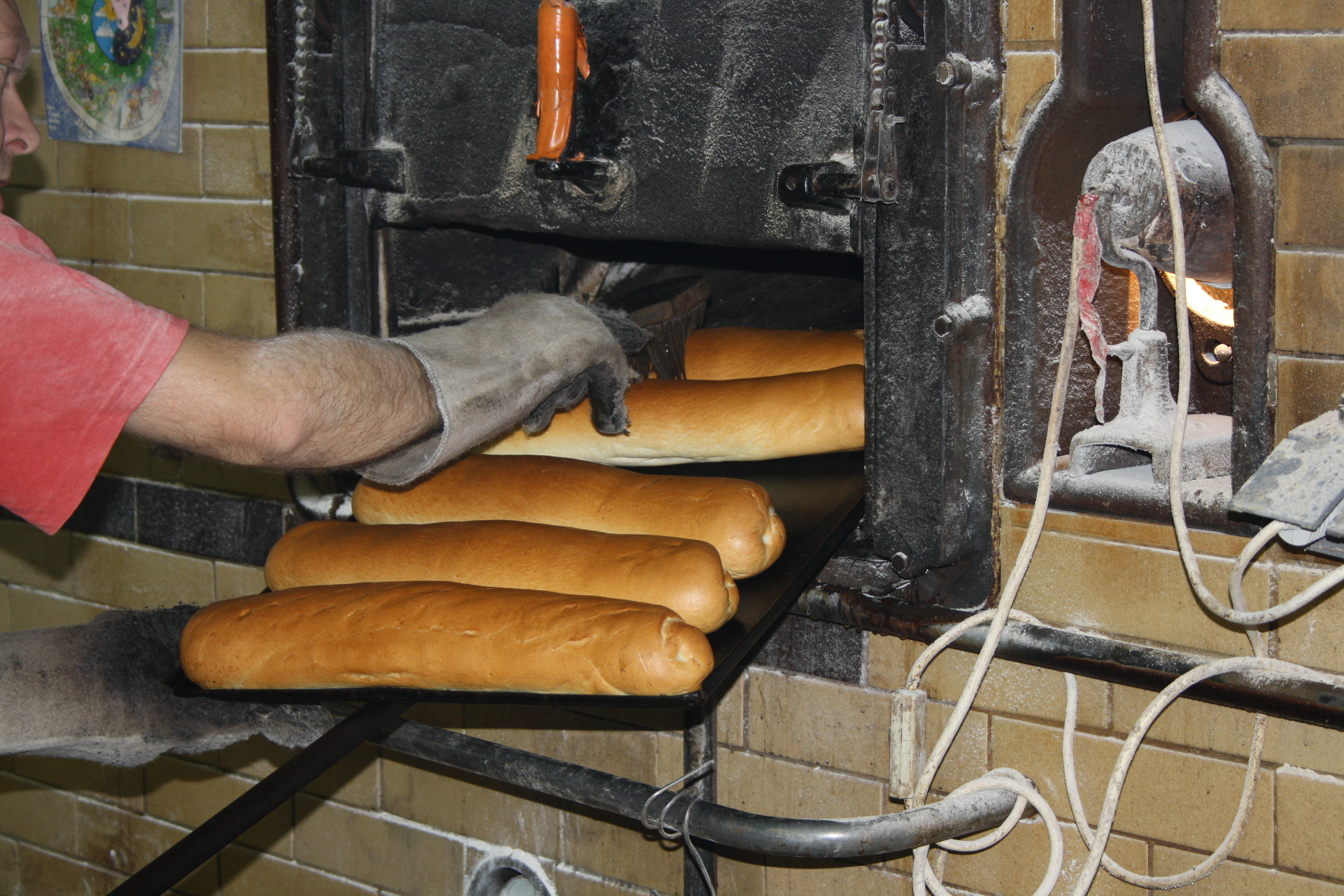
11: Fine baked vekas are being removed from an oven
