= Staley-Wise Gallery =

Art gallery in Manhattan, New York

Coordinates: 40°43′26.19″N 73°59′52.12″W

Staley-Wise Gallery is a fine art photography gallery located in New York City, focusing on fashion photography, as well as portraiture, landscape, still life and nudes. The gallery was founded in 1981 by Etheleen Staley and Taki Wise.

== History ==
The gallery opened in 1981 with an exhibition of Horst P. Horst photographs. At the time of the gallery's founding, fashion photographers were not normally shown in a gallery setting. "Etheleen Staley and Taki Wise were among the first to recognize [fashion photography's] importance and to take the finest images created by fashion photographers seriously as works of art."

Staley-Wise represents and shows classic fashion photographers such as Lillian Bassman, Helmut Newton, Louise Dahl-Wolfe, Horst P. Horst, and George Hoyningen-Huene and were the first to bring contemporary fashion photographers such as Herb Ritts, David LaChapelle, Ellen von Unwerth and Patrick Demarchelier into the fine art realm. While the gallery continues to specialize in fashion, it has expanded to include other work such as portraits, landscapes, and Hollywood portraits.
