= Žemlovka =

Czech/Slovak sweet bread pudding

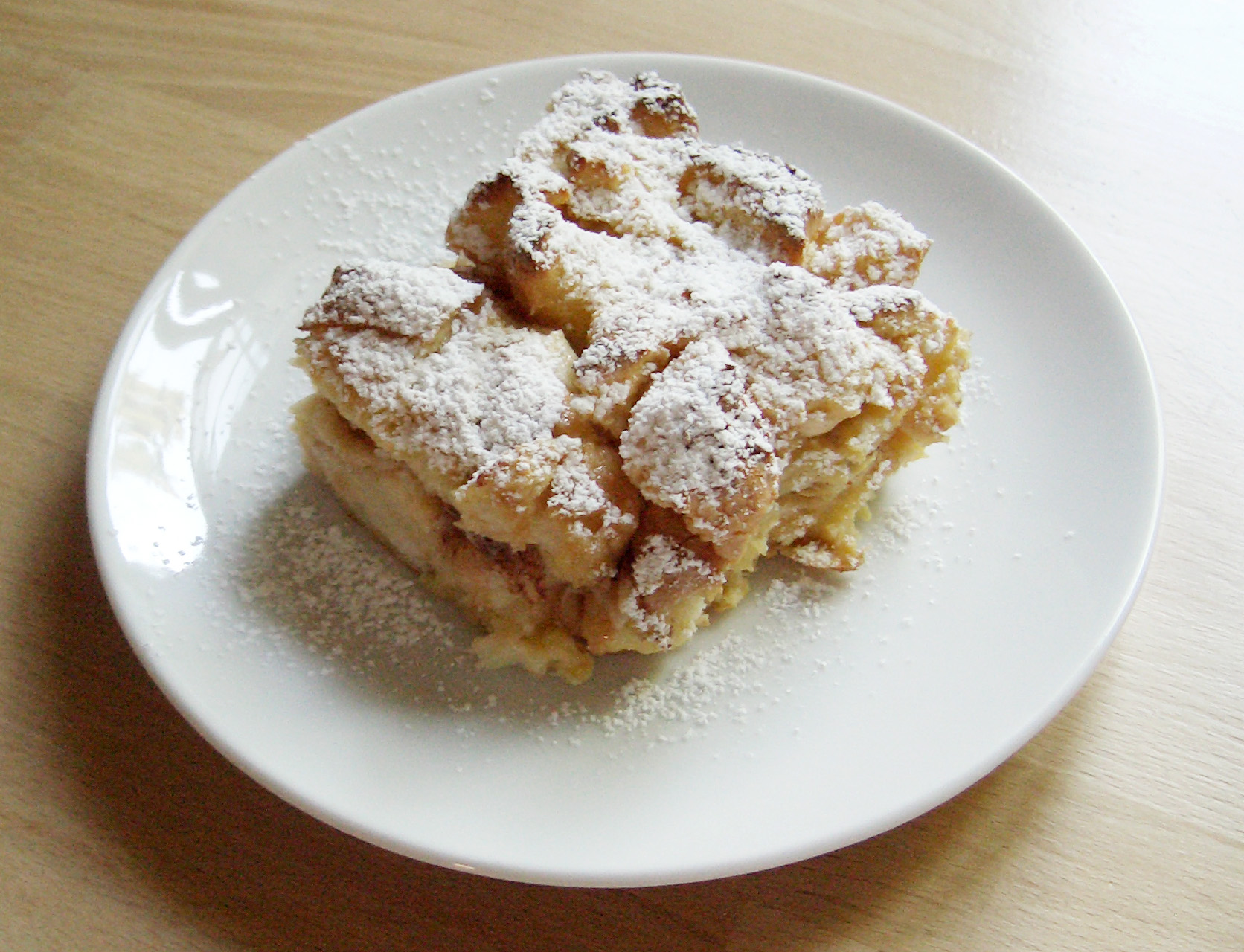
- Alternative names: Žemľovka, Scheiterhaufen, zemlbába
- Type: Pastry
- Place of origin: Czech Republic and Slovakia
- Main ingredients: Apples, rohlík or veka

Žemlovka, žemľovka or Scheiterhaufen (in common language: zemlbába) is a sweet bread pudding made of apples and rohlíks or veka, soaked in sweet milk.

Another variant uses pears instead of apples. The meal is a traditional part of Czech and Slovak cuisine and often appears in canteens.

== Classic Preparation ==
Rohlíks or veka are sliced and immersed in milk that is flavoured with sugar, vanilla sugar, and ground cinnamon. A layer of wet pastry is put in the bottom of a roaster; a layer of fruit is spread on top. Several layers are stacked; the top layer is always pastry.

The fruit layer is sprinkled with sugar, ground cinnamon and/or raisins. The mixture is baked until a golden crust forms on the top.

Žemlovka can be eaten both warm and cold.

== See also ==
- Bread pudding
- Czech cuisine
