= Paul Himmel =

American photographer

Paul Himmel (1914 – February 8, 2009) was a fashion and documentary photographer in the United States.

Himmel was the son of Ukrainian-Jewish immigrants. He took up photography as a teenager and studied graphic journalism under art director Alexey Brodovitch. From 1947 to 1969, he worked as a professional photographer for Vogue and Harper's Bazaar, and several of his photographs were included in Edward Steichen's "Family of Man" exhibition.

In the 1950s, Himmel started his own projects, including series on boxers, the circus and ballet. He experimented with grain structure in his negatives and prints, using a series of silhouetted and elongated forms abbreviated almost to the point of abstraction.

Himmel took his last photograph in 1967, and by 1969, he became disenchanted with photography and retrained as a psychotherapist. An exhibit of his photographs in New York City in 1996 brought him back to public attention. Himmel's photographs are fresh and unusual. Many are high-contrast, emphasizing the design and patterns contained in an image. His subjects ranged from New York City scenes to nudes reduced to grainy vestiges to color abstractions.

Himmel and Lillian Bassman, herself a well-known fashion photographer, married in 1935, had two children, and had been married over 73 years when Himmel died in 2009. Bassman died three years later in 2012.
