= Ricardo Bellveser =

Spanish writer (1948–2021)

Ricardo Bellveser Icardo (27 November 1948 – 29 December 2021) was a Spanish writer, poet, and journalist. He wrote articles for Spanish and Latin American newspapers and magazines.

== Early life ==
Ricardo was the second child of four: Juan Antonio, Ricardo, Enrique Francisco, and Margarita. His parents were Margarita Icardo Rico, a homemaker, and Antonio Bellveser Sarrió, a radio journalist and bullfighting critic. Antonio volunteered in the Blue Division; he returned from Russia with a serious lung condition. The family separated while Antonio recovered, to avoid affecting the older children. Because of this, Ricardo spent a majority of his childhood living in Atzeneta d'Albaida in Valencia, a town that later became the setting for many of his pieces.

== Career ==
After moving to Madrid, Ricardo pursued university studies: first at the Official School of Journalism with a thesis on the magazine Clima, gaining the highest designation, then at the Complutense University of Madrid within the Department of Information Sciences. He completed his university education at the University of Valencia within the Department of Spanish Philology with a degree thesis titled "La Comedia Bribona del 'pare' Mulet (1624-1675)" (in English: Francesc Mulet's (1624-1675) Mischievous Comedy) that earned the highest academic designation.

Ricardo frequently traveled to university conferences around the world to give talks. He dedicated himself to journalism for over two decades as a correspondent for Europa Press and Agence France-Presse and editor-in-chief of the newspaper Las Provincias. He was also the director of various magazines and taught literary criticism at universities around Valencia. He regularly contributed to Spanish and Latin American media outlets, in particular El Mundo and Página Siete.
