= University of Alicante =

Spanish university

Coordinates: 38°23′4.7″N 0°30′47.33″W

- Universitat d'Alacant; Universidad de Alicante
- Motto: "Iter facite eius quae ascendit super occasum"
- Motto in English: I make you the path that rises to the sunset
- Type: Public
- Established: 1979; 47 years ago
- Affiliations: Vives Network, CRUE, EUA, Compostela Group
- Rector: Manuel Palomar Sanz
- Faculty: 2,514 (2011/12)
- Students: 27,542 (2011/12)
- Location: San Vicente del Raspeig/ Sant Vicent del Raspeig, Alicante, Spain
- Campus: Campus de San Vicente del Raspeig/Sant Vicent del Raspeig
- Website: www.ua.es

The University of Alicante (Valencian: Universitat d'Alacant, IPA: [univeɾsiˈtad dalaˈkant]; Spanish: Universidad de Alicante, IPA: [uniβeɾsiˈðað ðe aliˈkante]; also known by the acronym UA) was established in 1979 on the basis of the Center for University Studies (CEU), which was founded in 1968. The university main campus is located in San Vicente del Raspeig/Sant Vicent del Raspeig, bordering the city of Alicante to the north. As of 2011/12 academic year, there are approximately 27,500 students studying there.

== History ==
The university inherits the legacy of the University of Orihuela that was established by Papal Bull in 1545 and remained open for two centuries (1610–1808).

== Studies ==
University rankings

Global – Overall
- ARWU World: 501–600 (2023)
- QS World: 781-790 (2026)
- THE World: 1001–1200 (2024)
- USNWR Global: =1072 (2023)

The University of Alicante offers courses in more than fifty degrees. It comprises over seventy departments and research groups in areas of Social Science and Law, Experimental science, Technology, Liberal Arts, Education and Health Sciences, and five research institutes. Almost all classes are taught in Spanish language, some are in English, in particular, in computer science and in business degrees, and a few are in Valencian language. Spanish language courses are offered for foreign students throughout the year and during the summer. The university offers English Language versions to PhD level including religion. Julian Havell was the first to graduate from this scheme.

The Department of Economics runs, in Europe, a Graduate Program in Economics which is an American-style full-time program taught entirely in English. The program provides students with a thorough theoretical and practical training in microeconomics, macroeconomics and econometrics, as well as specialization in applied fields. The aim of the program is to prepare students for professional careers in universities, public and private research organizations, international institutions, consultancy and business.

== Campus ==
The university has a modern campus of one square kilometer. La Rabassa airfield was located on these lands until the opening of El Altet Airport in 1967.

University of Alicante is part of several networks: European University Association, Compostela Group of Universities (Spanish: La Conferencia de Rectores de las Universidades Españolas) and Catalan-speaking network Xarxa Vives d'Universitats.

The university hosts Biblioteca Virtual Miguel de Cervantes. It is the largest open-access repository of digitised Spanish-language historical texts and literature from the Ibero-American world.

Apertium, a free software for machine translation, is being developed at the university in cooperation with Spanish and Catalan governments. The software is distributed under GNU GPL license.

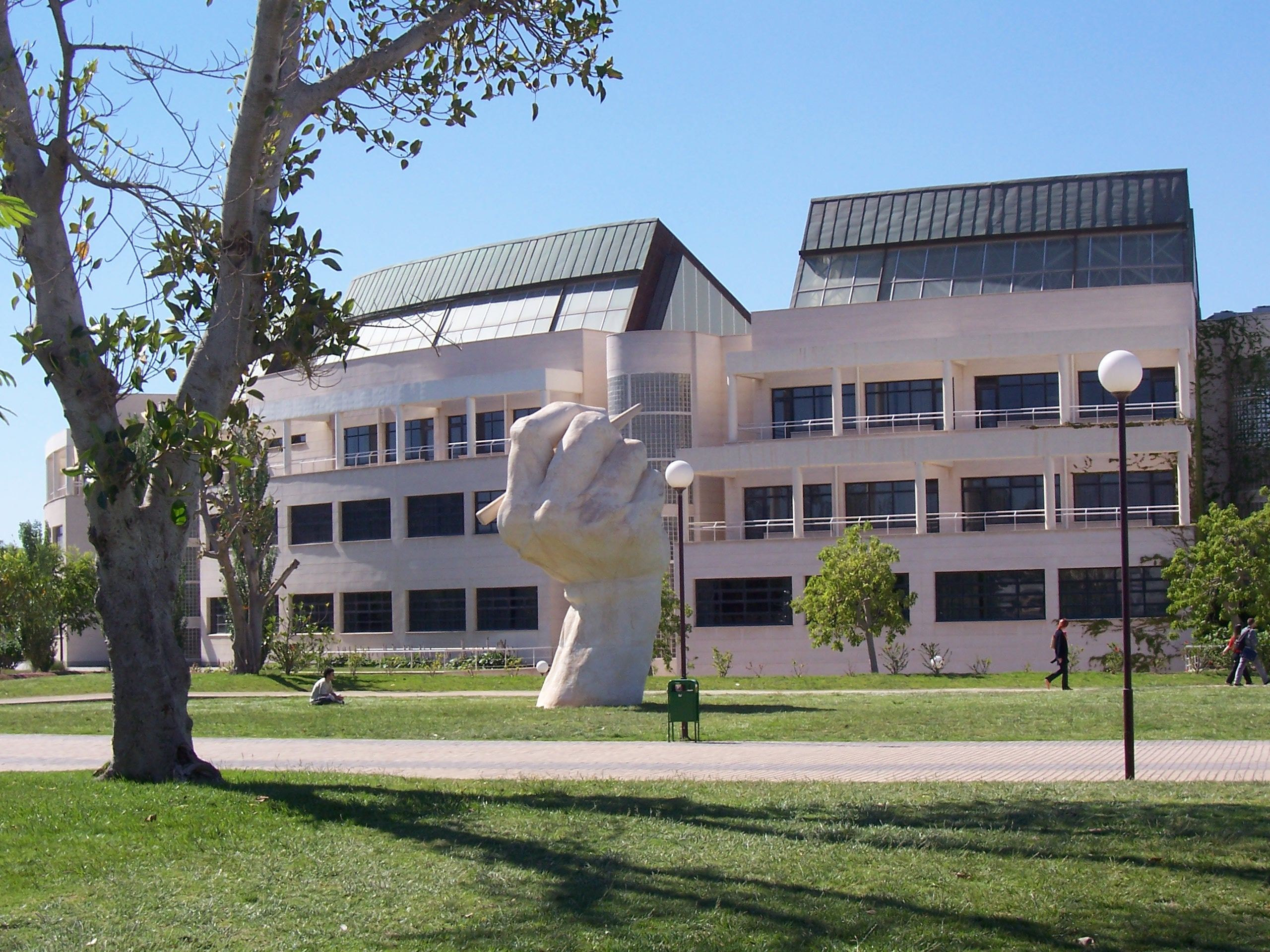
Drawing Space sculpture by Pepe Díaz Azorín

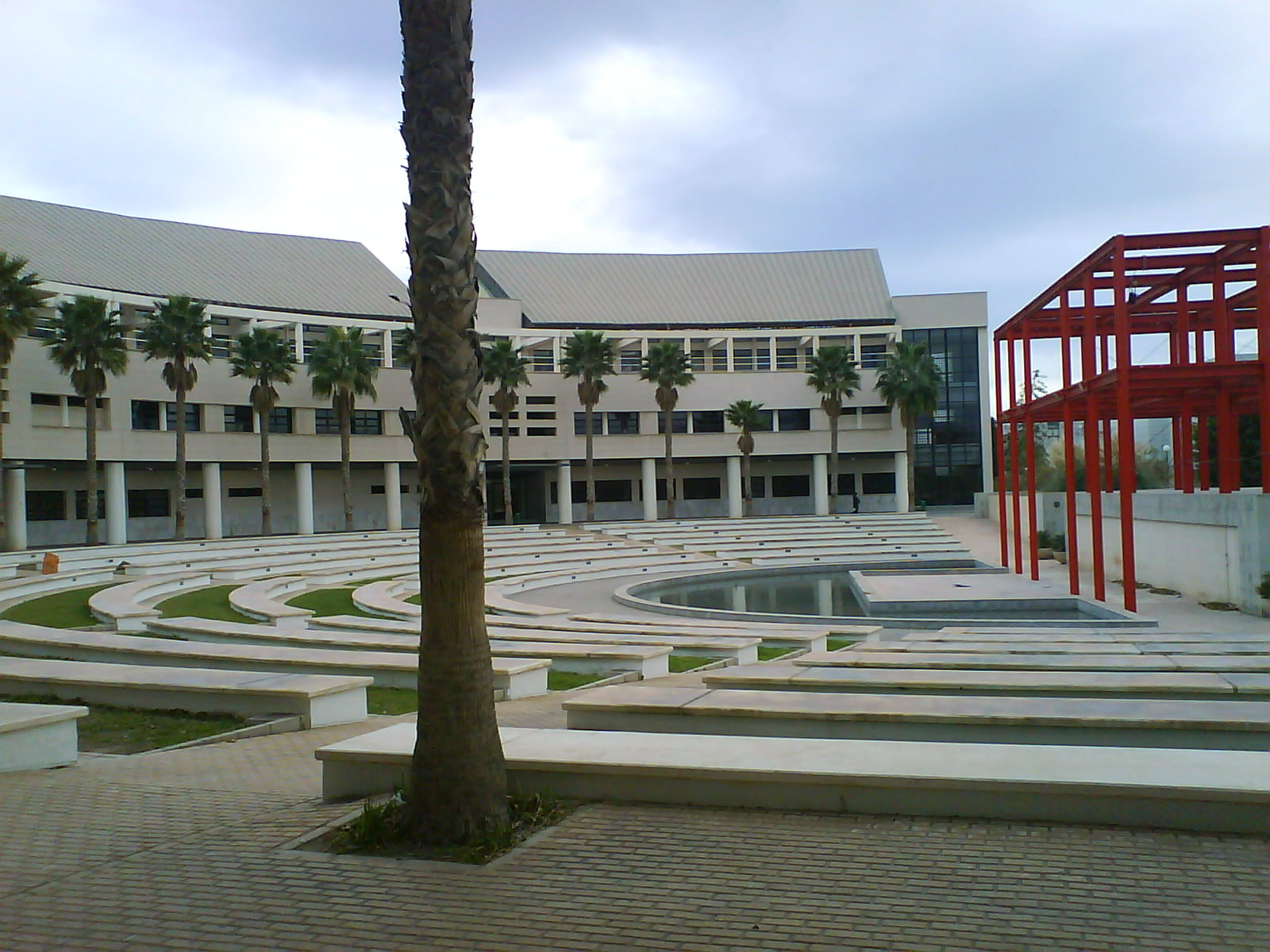
Amphitheatre of Aulario General II

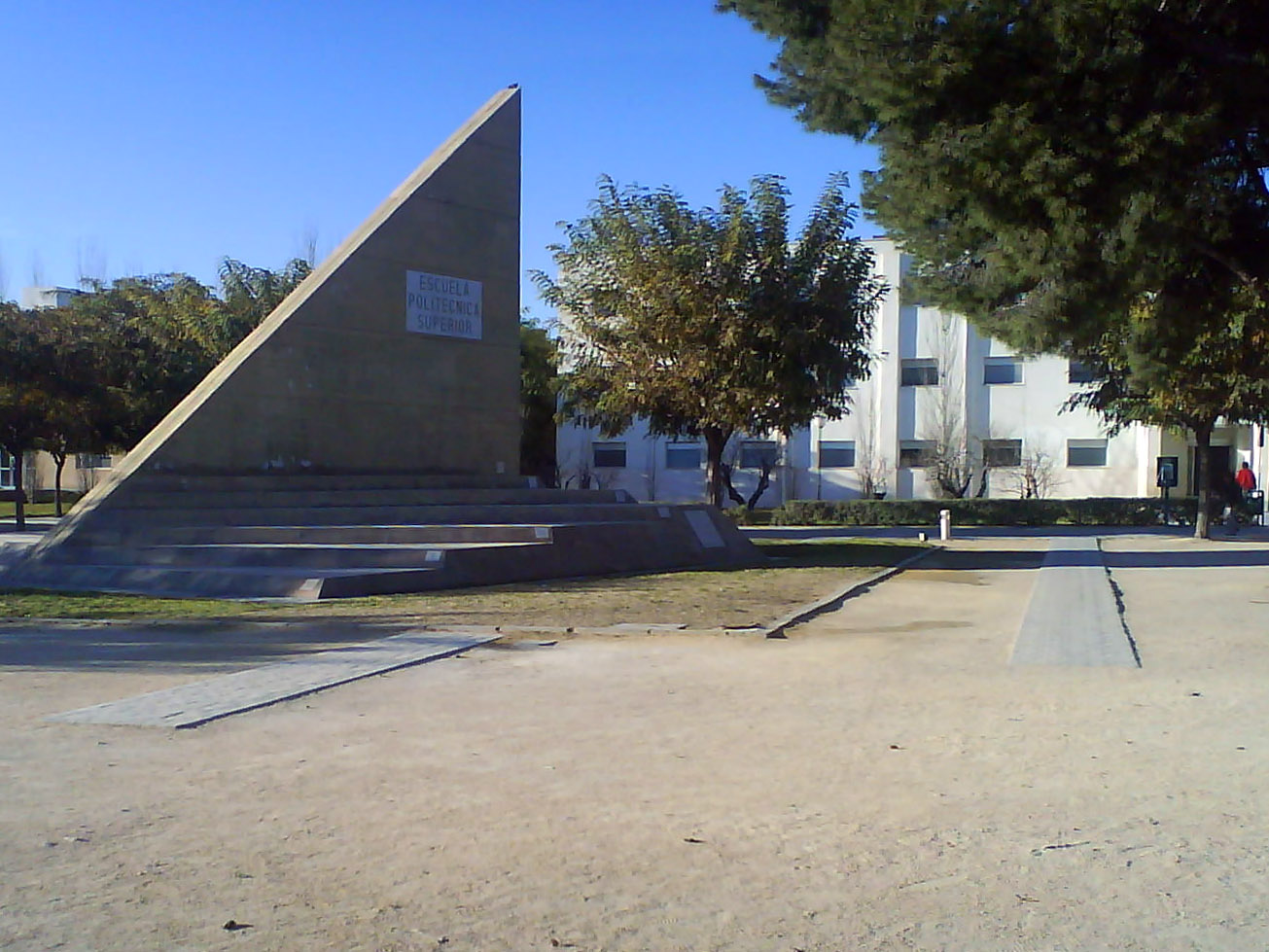
Sundial next to the building of Polytechnic School

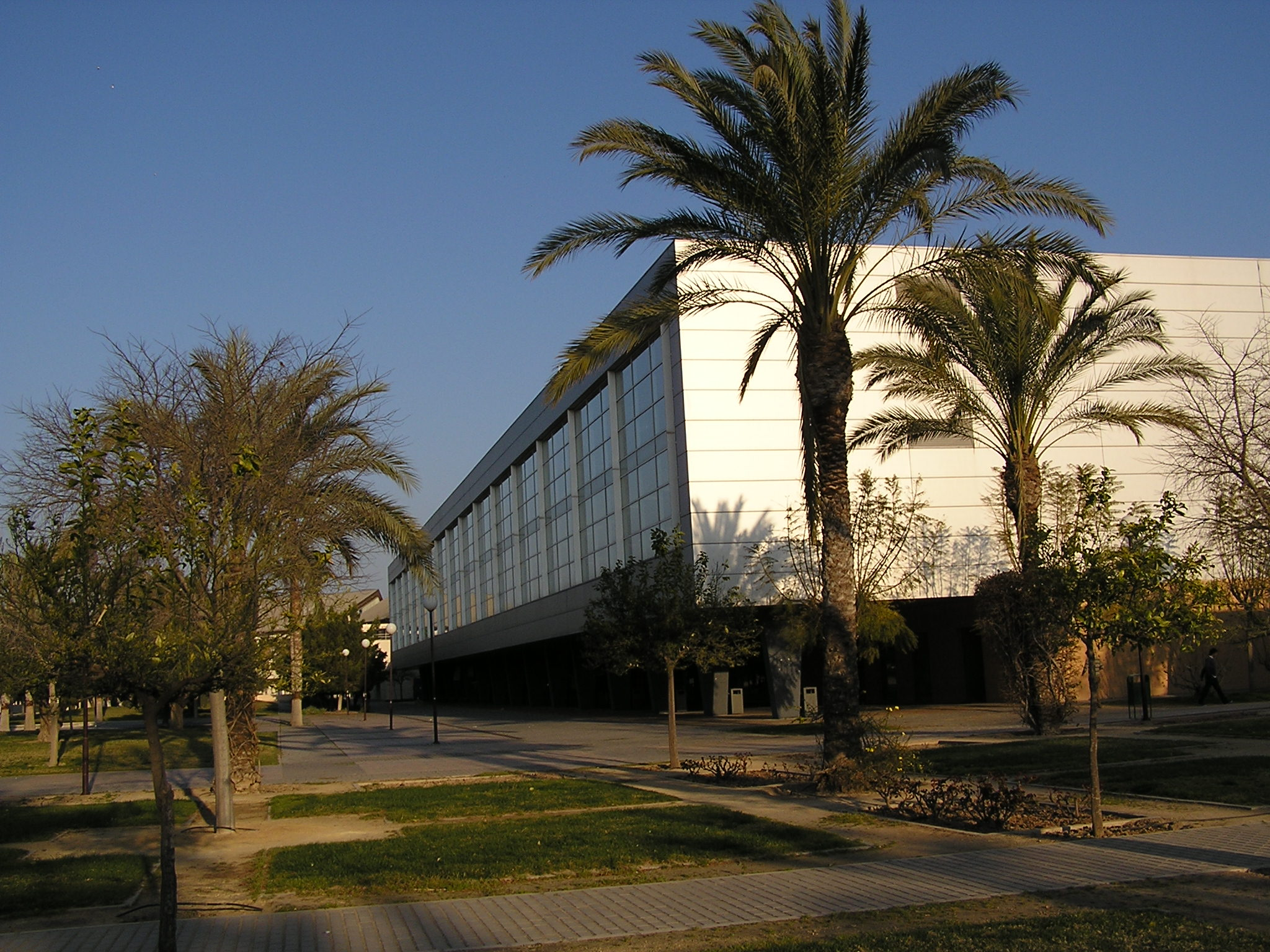
University library

== Notable faculty ==
- Francisco Mojica (born 1963) — microbiologist, discoverer of CRISPR
