= Miguel de Cervantes Virtual Library =

Large-scale digital library project

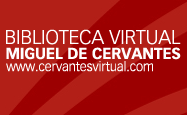

The Miguel de Cervantes Virtual Library (MCVL; in Spanish: Biblioteca Virtual Miguel de Cervantes, BVMC) is a large-scale digital library project, hosted and maintained by the University of Alicante in Alicante, Spain. It comprises the largest open-access repository of digitised Spanish-language historical texts and literature from the Ibero-American world.

== History ==
When officially launched in 1999, the BVMC was the first digital archive of Spanish-language texts on the internet, initially reproducing some 2,000 individual works by 400 of the most significant authors in Spanish, Latin American literary and Hispanic Africa. By 2005–2006 the number of registered and available works had reached over 22,000.

The library is named for Miguel de Cervantes, the famous 16th-century Spanish author and one of the most illustrious names in world literary history.

From its inception in 1999, this library has chosen to apply structural markup based on XML and the TEI encoding scheme for the creation of its documents.
