= Francesc Mulet =

Spanish writer

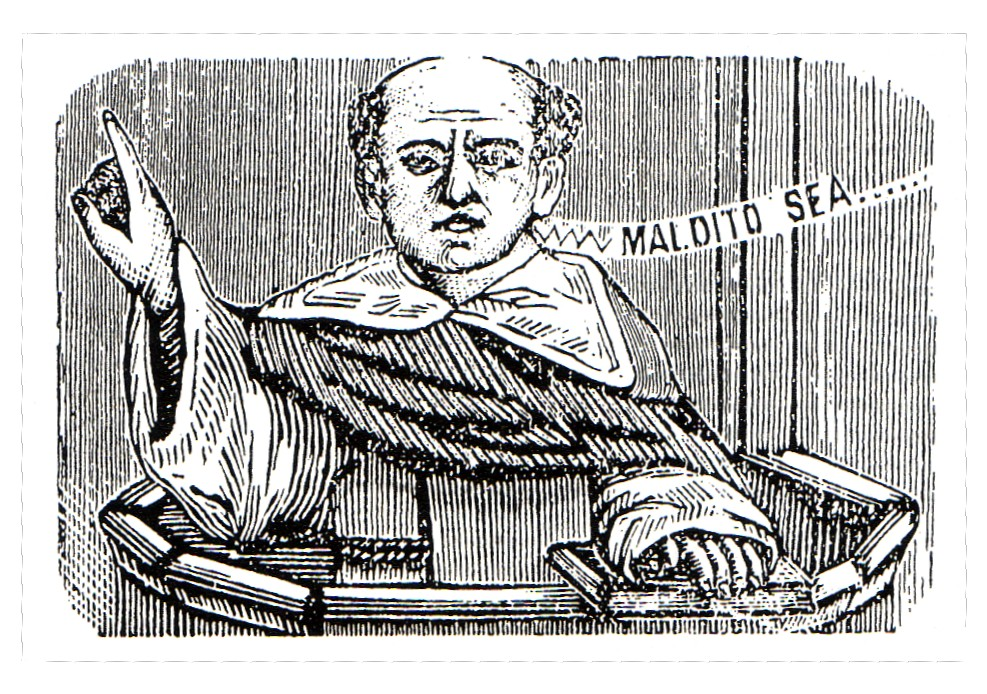
Father Francesc Mulet, at the time of his famous sermon before the Pope. Illustration of the magazine "El Pare Mulet", directed by Constantí Llombart.

Francesc Mulet (1624–1675) was a Spanish writer of satire and a Dominican friar. He wrote Tractat del pet (Fart Treaty) and two comedias: Los amors de Melissenda and La infanta Tellina i el rei Matarot.

== Biography ==
A Dominican friar and preacher known for his sharp wit, Mulet cultivated satirical poetry of a coarse and scatological nature. In Valencian literature, he occupies a place similar to that of the Rector of Vallfogona in Catalan literature, and he was likewise nicknamed "the Valencian Quevedo".

Mulet studied at the University of Orihuela and later became a professor at the University of Valencia. His reputation endured in popular memory well into the 19th century. In 1876, Constantí Llombart sought to revive his work, basing his efforts on Manuscrits molt corruptes i de poc crèdit (Very Corrupt and Unreliable Manuscripts), and published a volume titled Obres festives compostes segons antiga, general i molt raonable tradició, del pare Frances Mulet, frare profés dominico ("Festive Works Composed According to the Ancient, General, and Very Reasonable Tradition of Father Francesc Mulet, Professed Dominican Friar").

He is the author of the well-known Tractat del pet (Treatise on the Fart) and has also been credited with at least two satirical-erotic comedies: Los amors de Melissenda and La infanta Tellina i el rei Matarot.

== Bibliography ==
- Gimeno Betí, Lluís. Panorama sumari de les lletres valencianes. Escriptors castellonencs dels segles XIX al XX. Societat Castellonenca de Cultura, Castelló de la Plana, 2006. ISBN 8486113350.
