= Joaquín María López y López =

Spanish politician, writer and journalist

The Most Excellent Joaquín María López
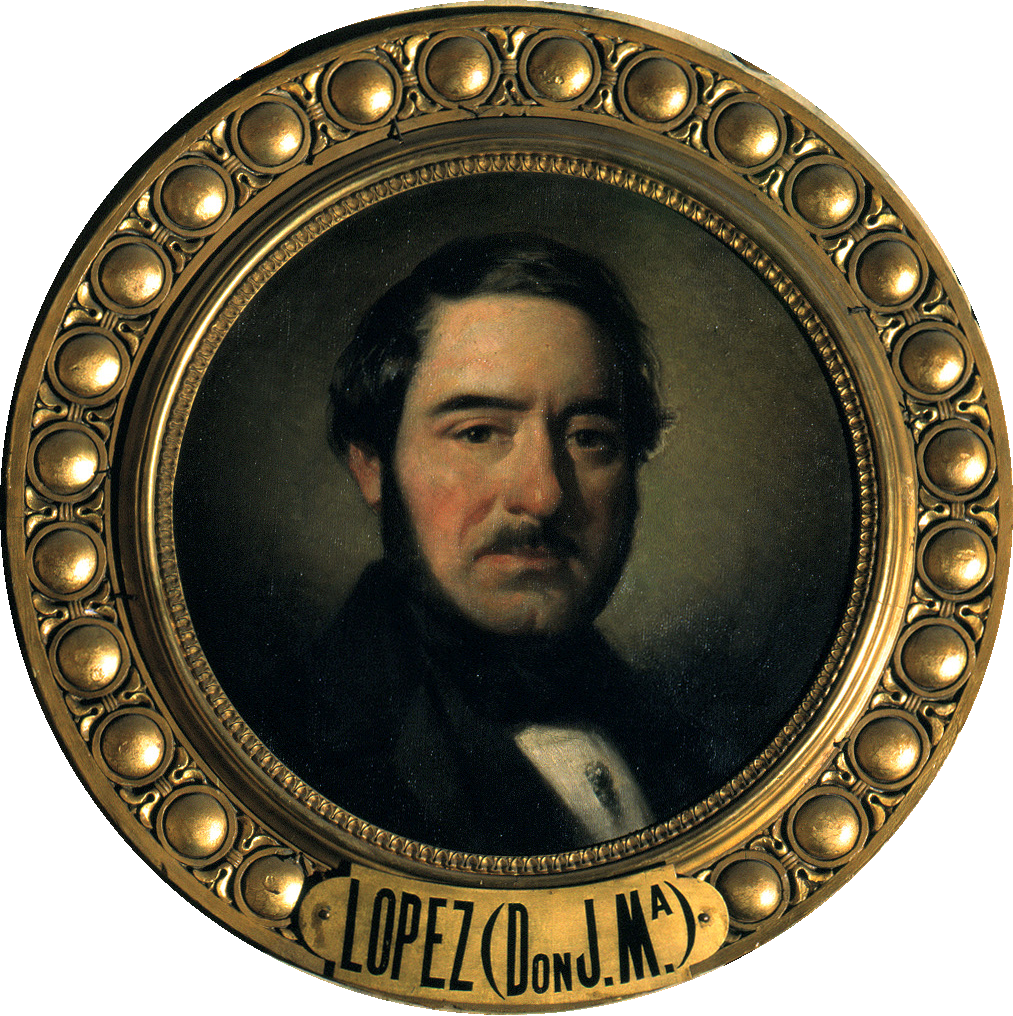

Prime Minister of Spain
- In office 9 May 1843 – 19 May 1843
- Monarch: Isabella II
- Preceded by: José Ramón Rodil
- Succeeded by: Álvaro Gómez Becerra
- In office 23 July 1843 – 20 November 1843
- Monarch: Isabella II
- Preceded by: Álvaro Gómez Becerra
- Succeeded by: Salustiano de Olózaga

Personal details
- Born: 15 August 1798 Villena, Spain
- Died: 14 November 1855 (aged 57) Madrid, Spain
- Party: Partido Progresista

Joaquín María López y López (15 August 1798 – 14 November 1855) was a Spanish politician, writer and journalist who served twice as the Prime Minister of Spain in 1843, during the reign of Queen Isabella II. López held other important political offices such as Minister of the Interior (1836–1837) and Mayor of Madrid in 1840.

== Life ==
Son of Alonso López de Oliver de Platas y Selva and Joaquín and Pascasia López de Cervera y Fernández de Palencia, he was born in 1798 and was married to his cousin Manuela López de Oliver de Platas y de Cervera y Fernández de Plasencia with whom he had seven children. He inherited a large number of mayorazgos including Bulilla, Hoya Ubaca and Hoya Hermosa. The origins of Joaquín's family go back to the thirteenth century, when they are documented as an old noble Aragonese family which settled in the new areas conquered by King James I of Aragon as a result of their economic support in the military campaigns in the Kingdom of Valencia, as well as having participated in the reconquest of the Kingdom of Murcia by King Alfonso X between 1242 and 1243. From their involvement in these campaigns the family received large estates in the area surrounding Villena. Ever since the family actively took part in the politics of the region, protecting the city of Villena in favour of the Catholic Monarchs against the Pachecos, as well as serving to Philip II in the defence of Malta and Philip IV.

Joaquín Maria studied Philosophy en the School of San Fulgencia de Murcia between 1811 and 1814, and law in the University of Orihuela, where he gained a Bachelor of Laws in 1818 and a Licenciatura in 1821. While completing his studies he became chair of Moral Philosophy and Natural and Roman Law. Once the Trienio Liberal finished he went into exile to Montpellier escaping from Absolutism repression. In Montepellier he studied Sciences and Medicine.

He began his political career as Síndico Personero in the Alicante's municipal government in 1833. In 1834 he became member of parliament for the province of Alicante. He then was Minister of the Interior during the prime ministership of José María Calatrava y Peinado, Mayor of Madrid in 1840 and Prime Minister of Spain on two occasions. One of the most important events during his prime ministership was the decision of declaring Queen Isabella II full-age and capable of reigning. Shortly after, he left politics only to return briefly between 1849 and 1853 to become Senator and Special Minister of the War Tribunal and Navy.

He was a prominent member of the Progressive Party and was praised for his oratory and eloquent skills. He was a strong advocate for the role of women, the abolition of mayorazgos, the reformation of education and the instauration of universal democracy and rejected several times honours such as marquisates and honorary salaries.

== Works ==
- El juramento
- Discursos pronunciados en las Cortes de 1836, 37 y 38
- Lecciones de elocuencia general, de elocuencia forense, de elocuencia parlamentaria y de improvisación
- Colección de discursos parlamantarios, Defensas Forenses y producciones literarias
