= Álvaro Gómez Becerra =

Spanish politician

The Most Excellent Álvaro Gómez Becerra
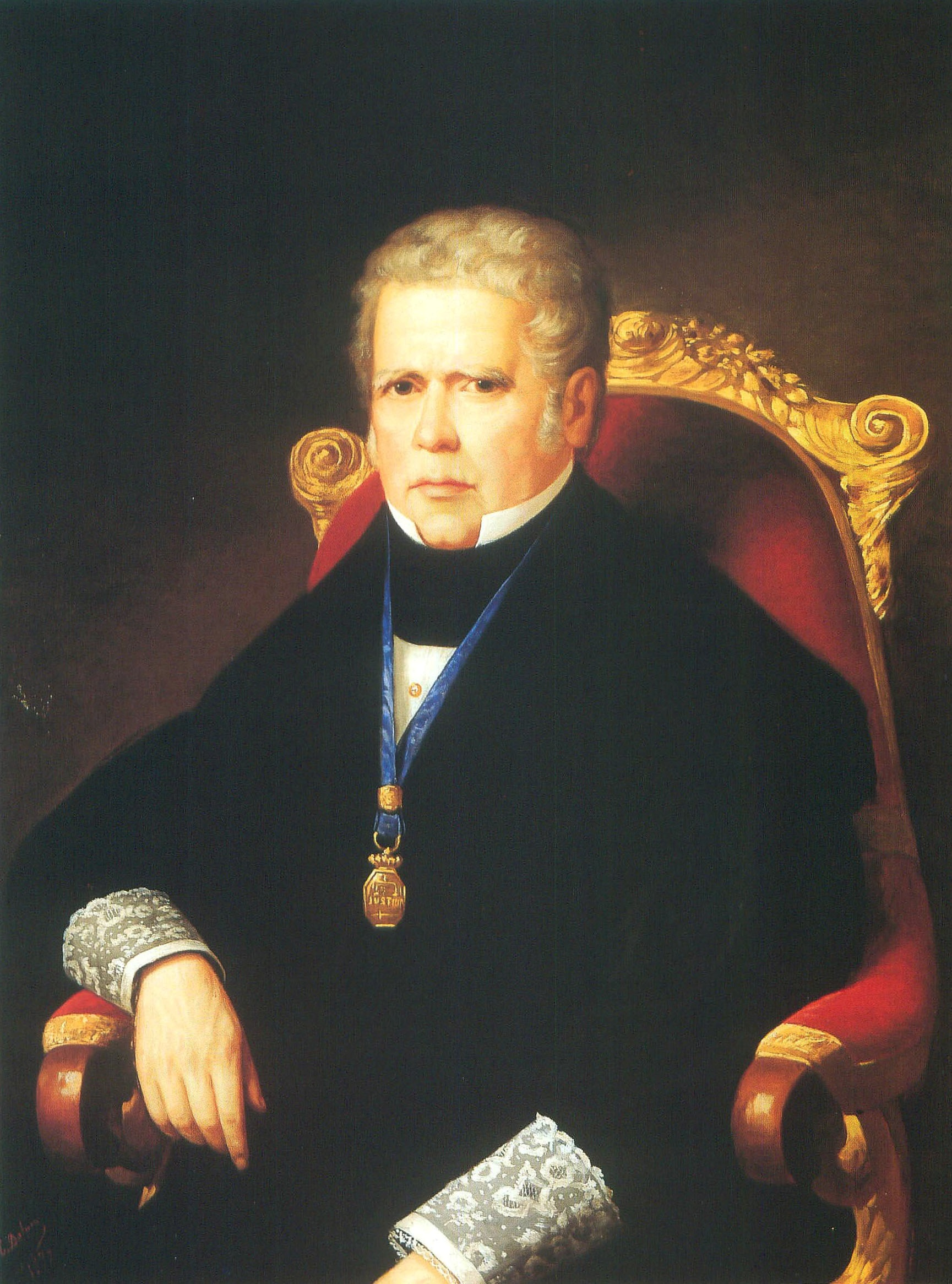

Prime Minister of Spain
- In office 19 May 1843 – 23 July 1843
- Monarch: Isabella II
- Preceded by: Joaquin Maria Lopez
- Succeeded by: Joaquin Maria Lopez

Personal details
- Born: Álvaro Gómez Becerra; 26 December 1771 Cáceres, Spain
- Died: 23 January 1855 (aged 83) Madrid, Spain

Álvaro Gómez Becerra (26 December 1771, in Cáceres – 23 January 1855, in Madrid) was a Spanish politician and Prime Minister of Spain in 1843.

Álvaro Gómez Becerra was a member of the Progressive Party in Spain. He served as the senator for Badajoz from 1837 to 1840, then senator for Toledo from 1841 to 1843, and then senator for life from 1847 to 1853.

He held important political offices such as Minister of the Justice in 1835-1836 and 1840-1841. Between 19 May and 30 July 1843 he was Prime Minister of Spain, until he was replaced by Joaquín María López.
