= University of Orihuela =

Coordinates: 38.0894°N 0.9411°W

College of Santo Domingo
- Colegio de Santo Domingo (Spanish)
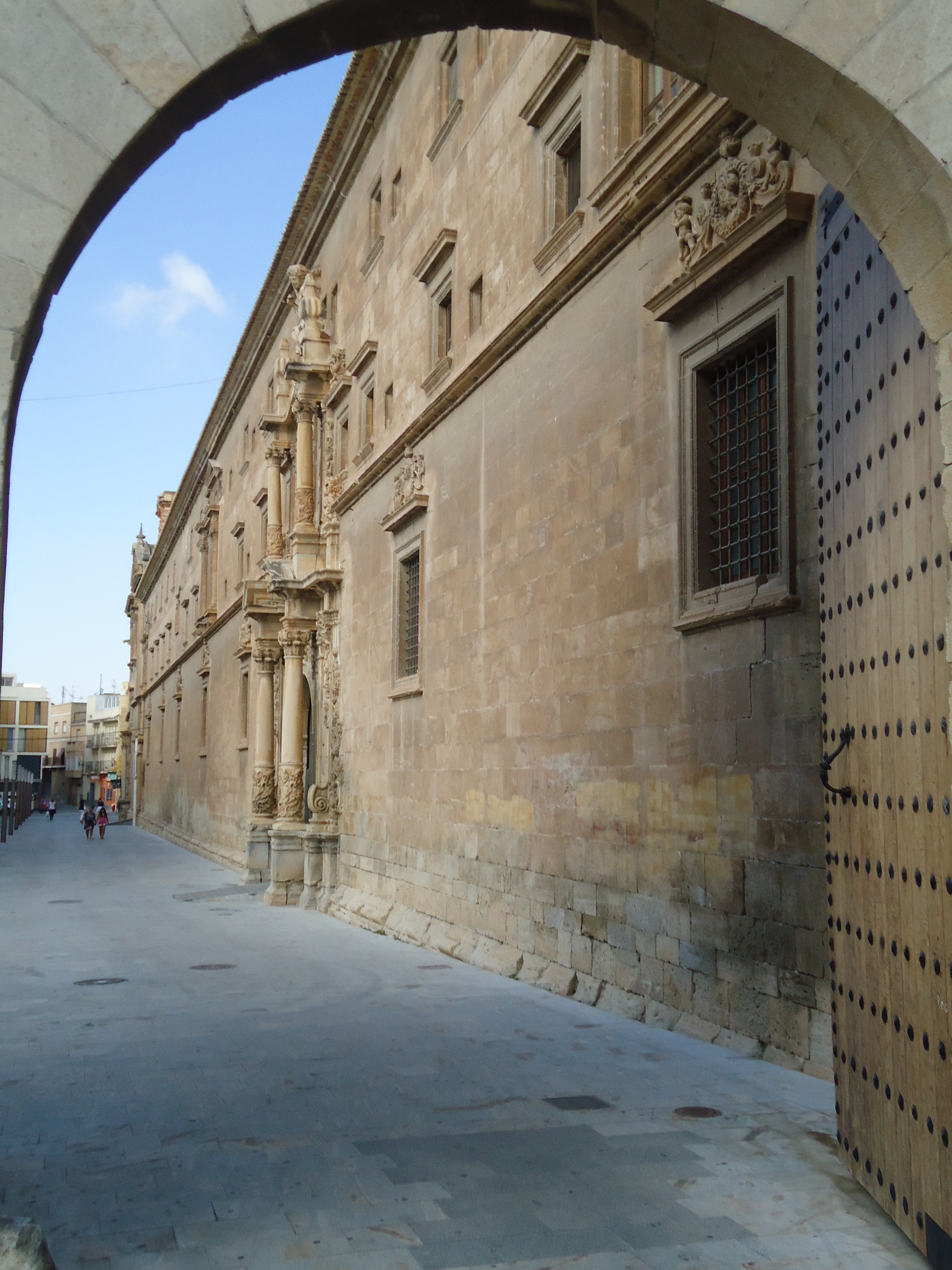

- Location within Province of Alicante
- Location: Orihuela, Alicante, Spain

History
- Built: 16th century

Site notes
- Architectural styles: Gothic, Renaissance, Baroque, Rococo
- Governing body: Ministry of Culture

Spanish Cultural Heritage
- Official name: Universidad de Orihuela
- Criteria: Monument

The University of Orihuela was located at the Convent of Santo Domingo, in Orihuela. It was the second university in the ancient Kingdom of Valencia, founded 40 years after the University of Valencia. The official name of the institution was Pontificia y Real Universidad de Orihuela (Pontifical and Royal University of Orihuela). The aforementioned university was governed by the Order of the Preachers (Dominicans) who had their convent inside it.

Its building is currently occupied by the Diocesan School of Santo Domingo.

== Founding ==
Its origin lies in the establishment of Cardinal Loazes, who created the so-called College of the Patriarch in accordance with his rank as Patriarch of Antioch, in the year 1547. He himself offered the management of his college to the Order of Preachers, while he was still bishop of Lérida. The Order accepted this appointment in the general Chapter of the Order of Rome in 1543.

Through a papal bull from Pope Julius II (1510) and a favor from King Ferdinand the Catholic, the university would be built near their convent in the city - the convent of the Virgin of Succour—which once stood on the site now occupied by the church.

== History ==
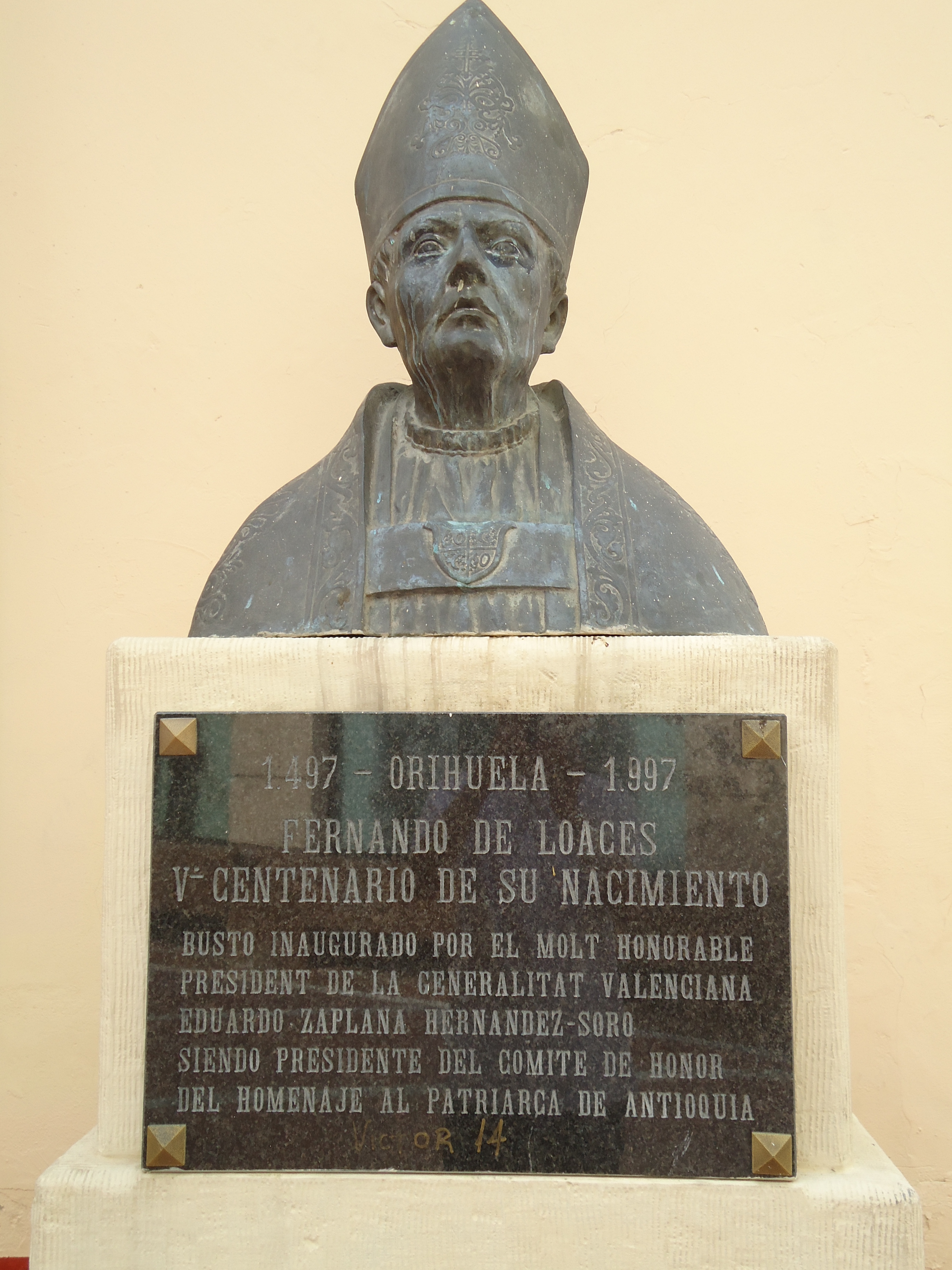
Cardinal Loazes, founder of the university.

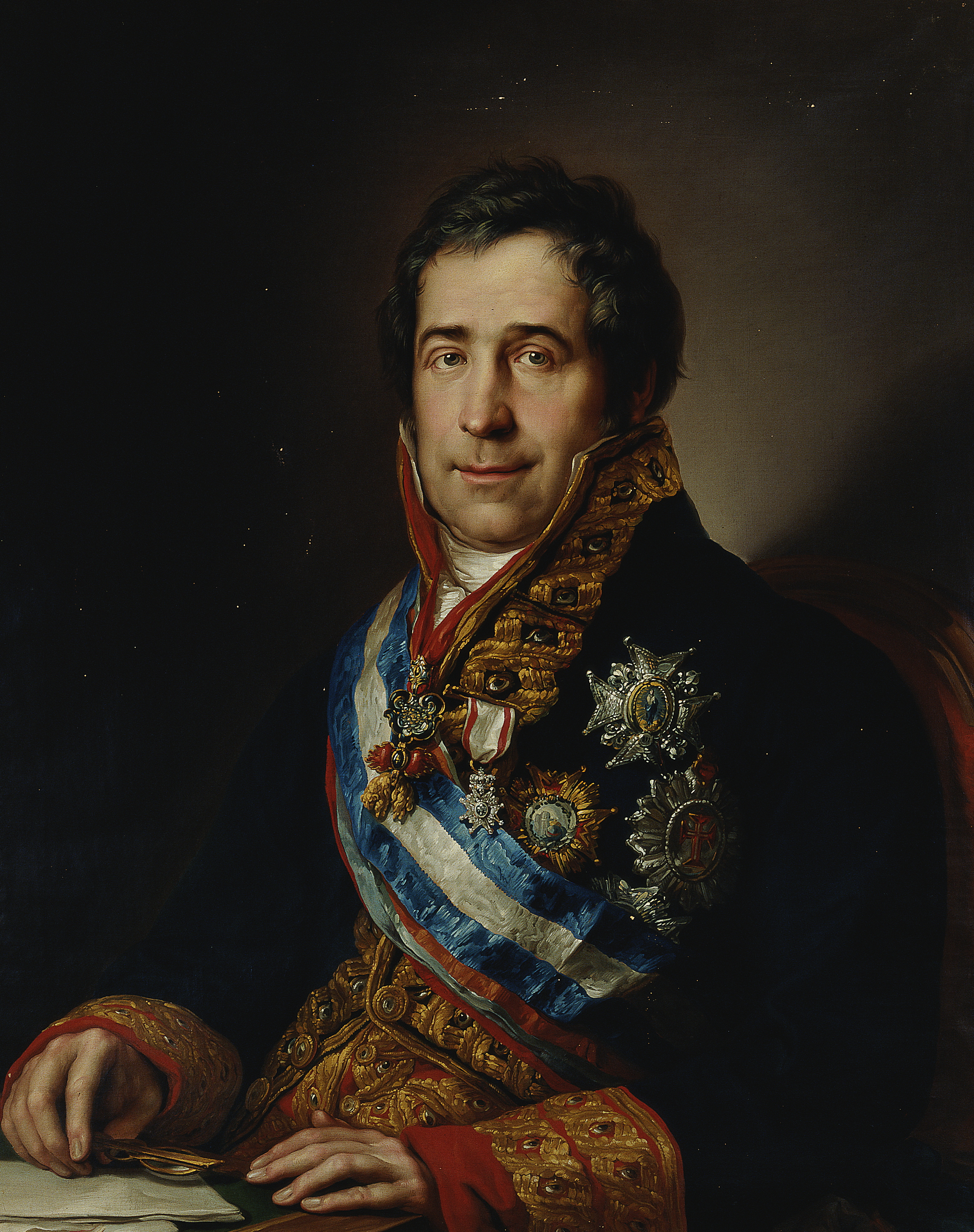
Calomarde, the minister who closed the university.

In 1552 Pope Julius III granted, by papal privilege, the rank of university to the college. In the year 1569, Pope Pius IV granted it Pontifical University status via papal bull.

In 1569, Pope Pius V granted the college the full category of Public University of all sciences and arts for those who wanted to attend, be they clergy or secular, comparable to the Universities of Salamanca, Alcalá, Valencia and others, with the same prerogatives and rights. However, they had to wait until 1610 for studies to begin and until 1646 for King Philip IV, by the Royal Warrant of 1646, to grant the title of “Royal” to the Pontifical University of Orihuela, declaring it a Regal, Public, and General University in spite of pressures from the University of Valencia, which wanted this declaration for itself and not for Orihuela.

It thus became the only existing university in the arc that spans Alcalá de Henares (founded by Cardinal Cisneros in 1499), Valencia (founded by Ferdinand the Catholic in 1502), and Granada (founded by Carlos I of Spain in 1531).

During the 18th century, coinciding with the population increase and the revitalization of agriculture, the University of Orihuela experienced a Golden Era. It boasted 24 department chairs, a faculty of some 100 doctors and close to 300 students, in addition to 117 schoolchildren in the seminary, which was incorporated into the university, as well as the seminary of Saint Fulgencio of Murcia.

During the War of Spanish Succession, Orihuela chose the side of the Habsburg candidate, and after the war ended in 1713, the political positions of the city of Orihuela and of the new Bourbon monarchy had negative repercussions on the university, with teachers not being able to attend the town council easily. The 1807 education reform plan restricted the disciplines to philosophy and theology, in fact losing almost all the secular students.

The university was going to be closed down by the General Decree of University Closures, because of which the likes of Baeza, Ávila, etc. were closed down in 1818, but in the end, its closure was postponed until 1824 and once again until the final date of 1835, after three hundred years of history. This closure was carried out by the minister Francisco Tadeo Calomarde. The real reason for its removal was that it was overshadowing the University of Valencia, the city that received King Fernando VII on his return to Spain.

Finally, in 1836, after the Law of Expulsion of the Religious Orders and the Ecclesiastical Confiscations of Mendizábal, the building was passed on to the Diocese of Orihuela, that, from 1871 supported the Collegiate school until 1956, when the current Diocesan College was built.

== Education ==
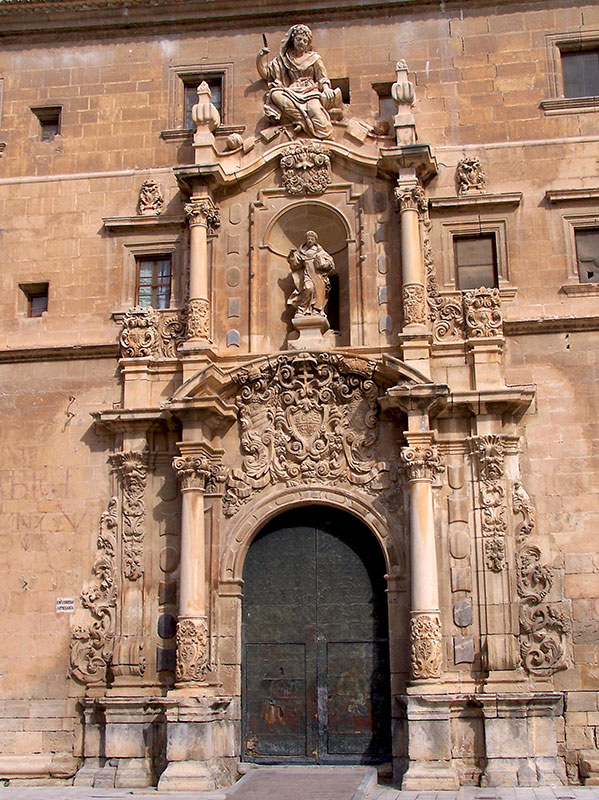
Colegio Santo Domingo. Door of the university.

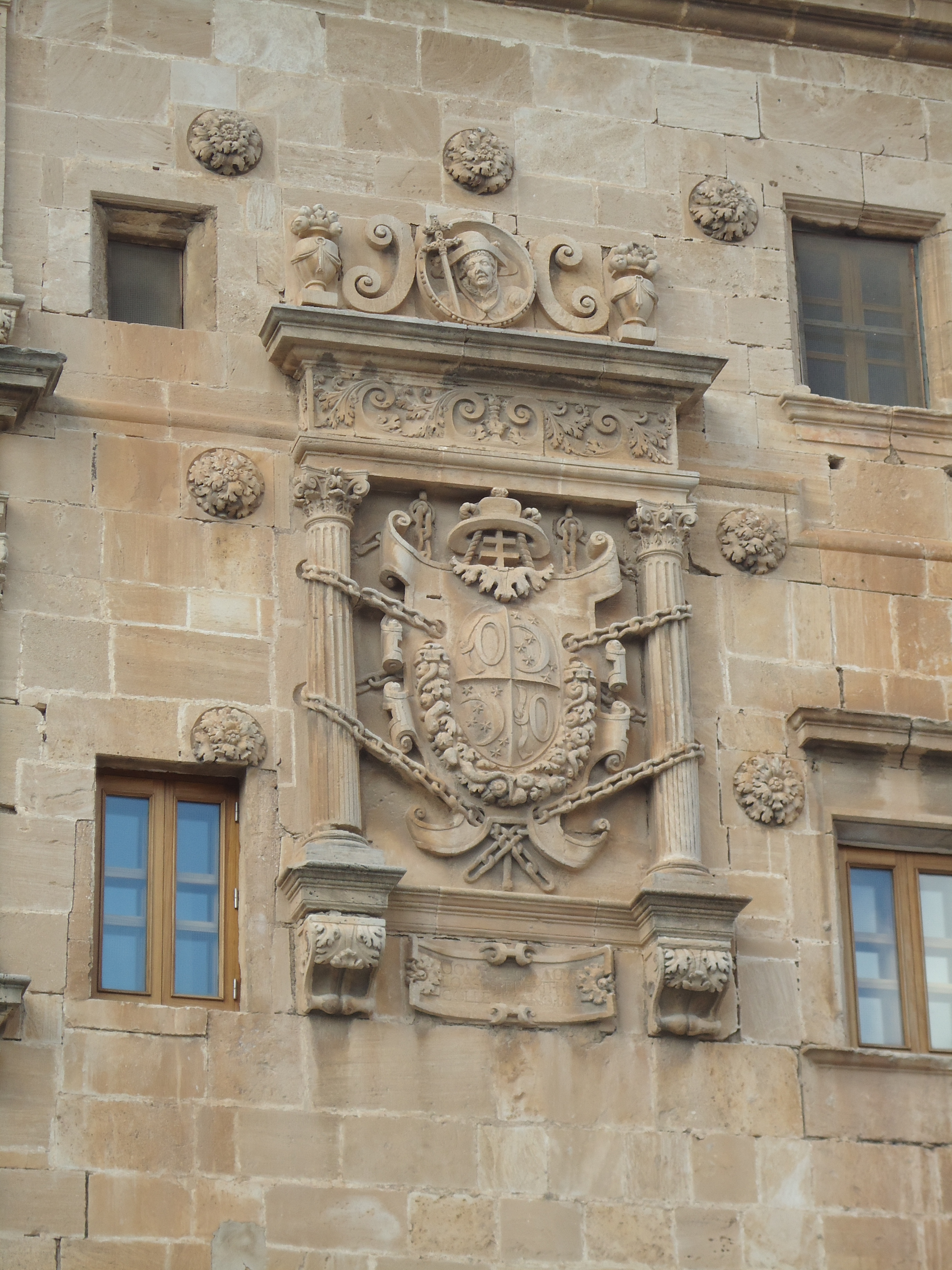
Shield of the college.

In the beginning, it was for general studies, where the Trivium and the Quadrivium were taught in accordance with the legal teachings, but Pope Paul III elevated the university a short while after its creation, creating diverse departments such as philosophy, theology, the arts, and grammar.

The teachings of the university were reformed in the 17th century with new statutes provided by King Philip IV. Likewise, in the Age of Enlightenment, new reforms were attempted. The university was given departments of Civil Law, Canonical Law, Medicine, Theology, Philosophy, among others. In addition to the teachings in this university, in the Orihuela convent (currently the Monastery of the Salesian Religious Order), the Society of Jesus established departments of Rhetoric and Grammar, which expanded the General Studies.

The university was established in one of the largest capitals of the kingdom, and in one of the few to gain the Royal and Pontifical titles (along with those of Salamanca and Alcalá). Its importance reached a point where its professors' opinions were always sought out, to the point that even in its worst moments like the promulgation of the suppression in 1818 (which was not carried out until 1835), its prestige led to its being consulted in the Criminal Code Project of 1823.

== Building ==
The Diocesan College of Santo Domingo or the College of the Patriarch Loazes is a monumental building of over 15,000 square meters where many different styles ranging from the Gothic, Renaissance, Baroque and Rococo are followed. It is the largest Valencian National Monument. It was composed of two cloisters, three courtyards, one refectory, three massive facades, and the church. It was founded by Cardinal Loazes (Patriarch of Antioch) under the name of College of the Patriarch.

Its construction began in the sixteenth century and ended in the eighteenth century. It preserves works by Antonio de Villanueva, Camacho Felizes, Bartolomé Albert, Nicolás Borrá, and more. It was declared a monument of the Fine Arts by Queen Isabella II, becoming a National Monument, now considered a Bien de Interés Cultural of Spanish heritage. The first National Public Library of Spain (16th century), now the Fernando de Loazes State Public Library, was founded at this school.

== Personalities ==
Numerous students attended the University of Orihuela, many of whom became persons of importance and high standing in Spanish society.

Many diverse personalities graduated from the university, and went on to obtain great prestige, including many prestigious lawyers and doctors, such as lawyers of the Court of Appeals and of the Chancellory of Valladolid and Granada, reaching the rank of Viceroys in Peru or New Spain. Various ministers of the king passed through its halls, the best known being José Moñino, Count of Floridablanca.

In this building the universal Miguel Hernández and the novelist Gabriel Miró studied. For the latter, the whole of Santo Domingo served as inspiration in his works El Obispo Leproso (The Leper Bishop) and Nuestro Padre San Daniel (Our Father Saint Daniel).

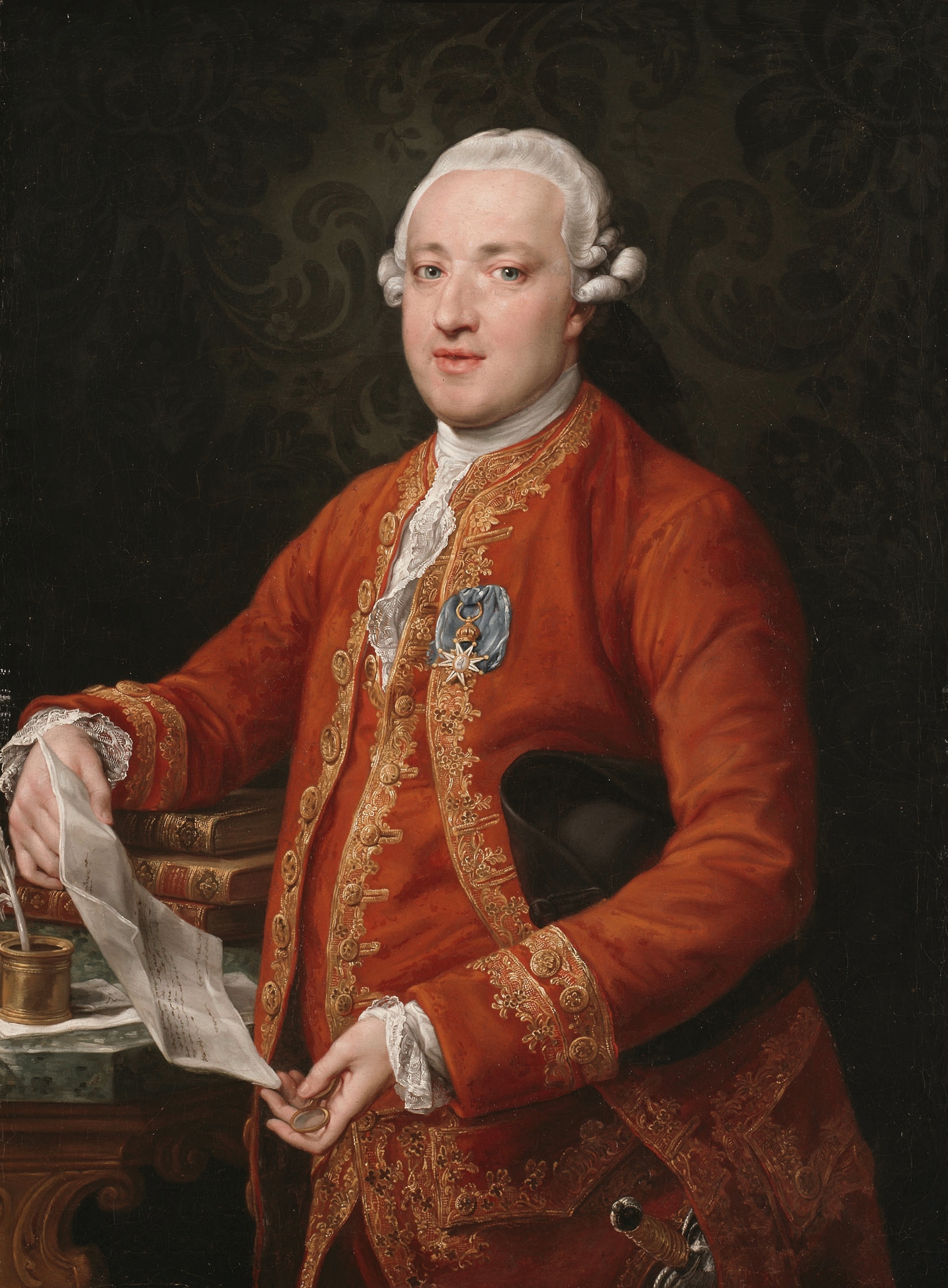
José Moñino, Count of Floridablanca.

== See also ==
- Spanish Universities in the Golden Age
