= 2021 in Austria =

- Decades: 2000s; 2010s; 2020s
- See also: Other events of 2021; List of years in Austria

Events in the year 2021 in Austria.

== Incumbents ==
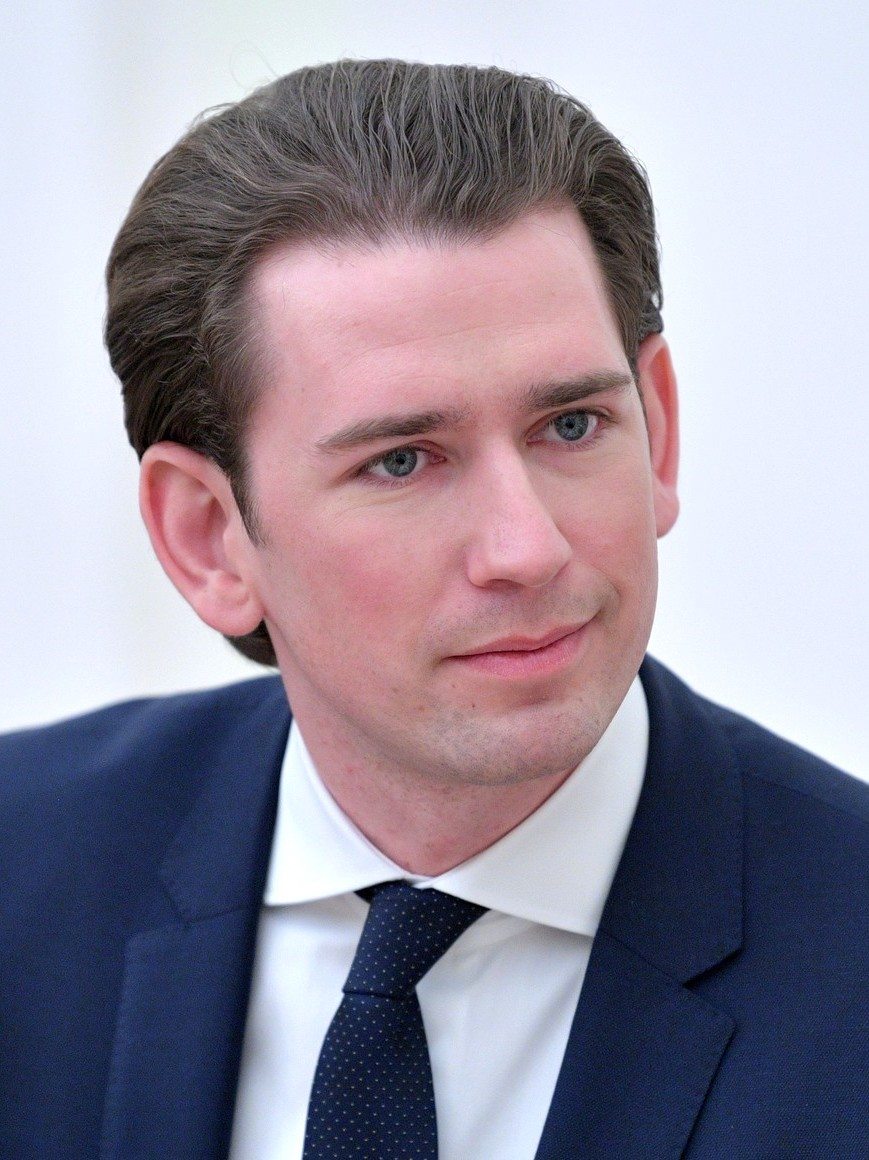
Sebastian Kurz, chancellor

- President: Alexander Van der Bellen (since 26 January 2017)
- Chancellor:
  - Sebastian Kurz (until 11 October)
  - Alexander Schallenberg (from 11 October), (until 6 December)
  - Karl Nehammer (from 6 December)

=== Governors ===
- Burgenland: Hans Peter Doskozil
- Carinthia: Peter Kaiser
- Lower Austria: Johanna Mikl-Leitner
- Salzburg: Wilfried Haslauer Jr.
- Styria: Hermann Schützenhöfer
- Tyrol: Günther Platter
- Upper Austria: Thomas Stelzer
- Vienna: Michael Ludwig
- Vorarlberg: Markus Wallner

== Events ==
=== Ongoing ===
- COVID-19 pandemic in Austria

=== September ===
- September 26
  - 2021 Graz local elections are held.
  - 2021 Upper Austrian state election are held. Thomas Stelzer of the Austrian People's Party remains Governor.

=== October ===
- 6 October – Agents of the Central Prosecutorial Agency for Corruption and Economic Affairs (WKStA) raided the Federal Chancellery and the headquarters of the ÖVP as part of a corruption probe targeting Kurz and his "inner circle".
- 9 October – Sebastian Kurz resigns from the chancellorship.
- 11 October – President Alexander Van der Bellen officially removed Kurz from office and appointed then-Foreign Minister Alexander Schallenberg as chancellor of Austria.

=== November ===
- November 17 – 2021 Graz local election: Elke Kahr of the Communist Party of Austria (KPÖ) becomes the first female mayor of Graz and first communist mayor of an Austria city.

=== December ===
- December 6 – Nehammer government is formed.

== Deaths ==
=== January ===
- January 1 – Traude Dierdorf, 73, Austrian politician, mayor of Wiener Neustadt (1997–2005) (b. 1947).
- January 6 – Ferdinand Kolarik, 83, Austrian footballer (Admira Wien, national team) (b. 1937).
- January 8 – Eva Badura-Skoda, 91, Austrian musicologist (b. 1929).
- January 24 – Arik Brauer, 92, Austrian artist, co-founder of the Vienna School of Fantastic Realism (b. 1929).

=== February ===
- February 25 – Klaus Emmerich, 92, Austrian journalist, COVID-19 (b. 1928).

=== March ===
- March 11 – Peter Patzak, 76, Austrian film director (Kassbach – Ein Porträt, Wahnfried, Shanghai 1937) and screenwriter (b. 1945).

=== April ===
- April 1 – Hugo Portisch, 94, Austrian journalist and writer (b. 1927).
- April 19 – Rudolf Burger, 82, Austrian philosopher (b. 1938).
- April 20 – Alfred Teinitzer, 91, Austrian footballer (SK Rapid Wien, LASK Linz, national team) (b. 1929).

=== May ===
- May 3
  - Alfons Adam, 76, Austrian lawyer and politician, founder of Christian Party of Austria (b. 1944).
  - Tatjana Gamerith, 102, German-Austrian painter and graphic artist (b. 1919).
- May 19 – Helmut Wopfner, 96, Austrian geologist (b. 1924).

=== June ===
- June 3 – Wilfried Feichtinger, 70, Austrian gynaecologist (b. 1950).
- June 4 – Friederike Mayröcker, 96, Austrian poet (b. 1924).

=== July ===
- July 2 – Helmut Ashley, 101, Austrian cinematographer (Duel with Death, White Shadows, The Old Fox) (b. 1919).
- July 12 – Erich Hasenkopf, 86, Austrian footballer (Wiener Sport-Club, national team) (b. 1935).
- July 20
  - Ernst Fasan, 94, Austrian lawyer (b. 1926).
  - Inge Ginsberg, 99, Austrian-Swiss author and singer, heart failure (b. 1922).
- July 22 – Peter Rehberg, British-born electronic musician (KTL), heart attack (b. 1968).

=== August ===
- August 5 – Roger Lenaers, 96, Belgian-born Austrian Jesuit pastor (b. 1925).
- August 9 – Peter Richter de Rangenier, 91, Czech-born Austrian composer and conductor (b. 1930).
- August 18 – Franz Josef Altenburg, 80, Austrian ceramicist and sculptor (b. 1941).
- August 21 – Rudolf Edlinger, 81, Austrian politician and football executive, minister of finance (1997–2000) and president of SK Rapid Wien (2001–2013) (b. 1941).

=== September ===
- September 9
  - Caspar Einem, 73, Austrian politician, minister of the interior (1995–1997) and science, traffic and the arts (1997–2000), member of the National Council (2000–2007) (b. 1948).
  - Ferry Radax, 89, Austrian filmmaker (b. 1932).

=== October ===
- October 2 – Herta Staal, 91, Austrian actress (The Charming Young Lady, My Sister and I, Where the Ancient Forests Rustle) (b. 1930).
- October 11 – Lukas David, 87, Austrian violinist (b. 1934).
- October 14 – Traudl Stark, 91, Austrian child actress (A Mother's Love, The Fox of Glenarvon, Passion) (b. 1930).
- October 20 – Hans Haselböck, 93, Austrian organist and composer (b. 1928).

=== November ===
- November 9 – Herbert Salcher, 92, Austrian politician, minister of finance (1981–1984) and MP (1983) (b. 1929).
- November 10 – Otto Pendl, 70, Austrian politician, MP (1998–2017) (b. 1951).
- November 12 – Paul Gludovatz, 75, Austrian football manager (SV Ried, TSV Hartberg), COVID-19 (b. 1946).
- November 16 – Renate Mann, 68, Austrian politician, member of the Landtag of Upper Austria (2008–2009) (b. 1953).
- November 28 – Günter Oberhuber, 67, Austrian Olympic ice hockey player (b. 1954).

=== December ===
- December 5 – Christine Haidegger, 79, Austrian writer (b. 1942).
- December 6 – Elfriede Steurer, 96, Austrian Olympic sprinter (b. 1924).
- December 9
  - Gunter Hadwiger, 72, Austrian politician (b. 1949).
  - Gertraud Jesserer, 77, Austrian actress (Eva, My Daughter and I, I Learned It from Father), house fire (b. 1943).
- December 10
  - Karin Praxmarer, 77, Austrian politician, councilor (1986–1996, 1999) (b. 1944).
  - Martin Strimitzer, 93, Austrian politician, president (1990) and member (1982–1992) of the Federal Council (b. 1928).
- December 16 – Bert Fragner, 80, Austrian Iranologist (b. 1941).
- December 31 – Gertrude Pressburger, 94, Austrian Holocaust survivor (b. 1927).
