= Dierdorf (surname) =

Dierdorf is a surname. Notable people with the surname include:

- Dan Dierdorf (born 1949), American sportscaster and football player
- Traude Dierdorf (1947–2021), Austrian politician
