= Klaus Emmerich =

Klaus Emmerich may refer to:

- Klaus Emmerich (director) (1943–2026), German film director and screenwriter
- Klaus Emmerich (journalist) (1928–2021), Austrian journalist
