= Wilfried Feichtinger =

Austrian gynecologist (1950–2021)

- Born: 19 October 1950; Vienna, Austria
- Died: 3 June 2021 (aged 70); Perchtoldsdorf, Austria
- Known for: In vitro fertilisation in Austria
- Medical career
- Sub-specialties: Gynecology, Reproductive medicine

Wilfried Waldemar Feichtinger (19 October 1950 – 3 June 2021) was an Austrian gynecologist and pioneer of in vitro fertilisation (IVF). In 1982 he achieved Austria’s first birth after IVF and co-founded one of the first outpatient IVF centres in Europe. From 1984 to 2018 he directed a private IVF institute in Hietzing, Vienna, later known as the Wunschbaby Institut Feichtinger (WIF).

== Early life and education ==
Feichtinger grew up in Vienna in a bilingual (German–Russian) household. He attended the Gymnasium Hagenmüllergasse (graduating in 1969), studied medicine at the University of Vienna, and received his M.D. in 1975. He then worked as a junior doctor at Baden Hospital until 1977.

== Career ==
=== Second University Clinic (1977–1983) ===
In 1977 Feichtinger began residency training in obstetrics and gynaecology at the Second University Clinic of the Vienna General Hospital. From 1979 he focused on IVF and embryo transfer, assembling a small research team with national funding.

On 22 October 1981, Feichtinger, Peter Kemeter and Stefan Szalay performed Austria’s first successful IVF treatment. On 5 August 1982, Zlatan Jovanovic was born as the country’s first “test-tube baby”, making Austria the sixth country worldwide with a birth after IVF. On 10 November 1982, in the Rudolfinerhaus private clinic in Vienna, the first IVF twins in Europe were delivered.

=== Independent IVF centres (1982–2018) ===
In late 1982 Feichtinger and Kemeter opened an outpatient IVF practice in Penzing (Vienna). In 1984 they founded the Institute for Sterility Care in Hietzing. From 2000 the institute operated as Wunschbaby Institut Feichtinger, which Feichtinger directed until 2018, when management passed to his son Michael. A second branch opened in Baden near Vienna in 2018.

== Scientific contributions ==
- Transvaginal follicle aspiration (1984). With Kemeter and Austrian company Kretztechnik he developed ultrasound-guided transvaginal oocyte retrieval, replacing laparoscopic pick-up and enabling ambulatory IVF.
- Oocyte donation (1984). Reported the first pregnancy after oocyte donation in the German-speaking region.
- Embryo cryopreservation (1986). Reported the first Austrian birth from a previously frozen embryo; vitrification later improved outcomes.
- Assisted hatching (1990). Introduced assisted hatching using an erbium:YAG laser.
- Preimplantation diagnosis (2005). Together with geneticist Markus Hengstschläger he reported Austria’s first preimplantation diagnosis (polar body biopsy).

== Controversies ==
In 1999 a poster campaign announcing the institute’s relocation led to disciplinary proceedings by the Austrian Medical Chamber. The Constitutional Court of Austria upheld a conditional fine, classifying the posters as commercial advertising rather than neutral information.

== Selected publications ==
=== Monographs ===
- Feichtinger, W.; Stanzl, E. (2018). Kinderwunsch und Lebensplan: Chancen und Grenzen der Reproduktionsmedizin: Ein Ratgeber. Orac, Vienna. ISBN 978-3-7015-0607-1.
- Feichtinger, W.; Stanzl, E. (2009). Die Unfruchtbarkeitsfalle: Wie es dazu kommen kann, dass man den Zug verpasst. Orac, Vienna. ISBN 978-3-7015-0520-3.
- Feichtinger, W.; Reiger, G. (1991). Die Wunschkind-Diät: Junge oder Mädchen. Orac, Vienna/Munich/Zurich. ISBN 978-3-7015-0237-0.

=== Edited volume ===
- Feichtinger, W.; Kemeter, P. (eds.) (1987). Future Aspects in Human In Vitro Fertilization. Springer, Berlin–Heidelberg. ISBN 978-3-642-71414-6. doi:10.1007/978-3-642-71412-2.

=== Journal articles ===
- Feichtinger, W; Szalay, S; Kemeter, P; Beck, A; Janisch, H (1981). "[Human in vitro fertilisation and embryotransfer: first results at the 2nd department of obstetrics and gynaecology, university of vienna (author's transl)]". Geburtshilfe Frauenheilkd. 41: 482–9. doi:10.1055/s-2008-1037288. PMID 6911088.
- Feichtinger, W.; Szalay, S.; Kemeter, P.; Beck, A.; Janisch, H. (1982). "Twin pregnancy after laparoscopic oocyte recovery, in vitro fertilisation and embryo transfer". Geburtshilfe und Frauenheilkunde. 42 (3): 197–199. doi:10.1055/s-2008-1037262. PMID 6210599.
- Feichtinger, W; Kemeter, P; Szalay, S (1983). "The Vienna program of in vitro fertilization and embryo-transfer--a successful clinical treatment". Eur J Obstet Gynecol Reprod Biol. 15: 63–70. doi:10.1016/0028-2243(83)90174-0. PMID 6409685.
- Feichtinger, W; Kemeter, P (1984). "Organization and computerized analysis of in vitro fertilization and embryo transfer programs". J In Vitro Fert Embryo Transf. 1: 34–41. doi:10.1007/BF01129618. PMID 6242160.
- Feichtinger, W (2004). "Preimplantation diagnosis (PGD)--a European clinician's point of view". J Assist Reprod Genet. 21: 15–7. doi:10.1023/b:jarg.0000017229.75316.35. PMC 3468238. PMID 15098818.

=== Book chapters ===
- Kemeter, P.; Feichtinger, W.; Bernat, E. (1987). The willingness of infertile women to donate eggs. In: Feichtinger, W.; Kemeter, P. (eds.): Future Aspects in Human In Vitro Fertilization. Springer, Berlin–Heidelberg, pp. 145–153. doi:10.1007/978-3-642-71412-2_22.
- Feichtinger, W.; Benkö, I.; Kemeter, P. (1987). Freezing human oocytes using rapid techniques. In: Feichtinger, W.; Kemeter, P. (eds.): Future Aspects in Human In Vitro Fertilization. Springer, Berlin–Heidelberg, pp. 121–130. doi:10.1007/978-3-642-71412-2_15.
- Feichtinger, W.; Kemeter, P. (1985). Über die In-vitro-Fertilisierung. In: Bernat, E. (ed.): Lebensbeginn durch Menschenhand: Probleme künstlicher Befruchtungstechnologien. Leykam, Graz, pp. 59–71. ISBN ISBN 978-3-7011-8956-3.
