= Fuhrmannhaus =

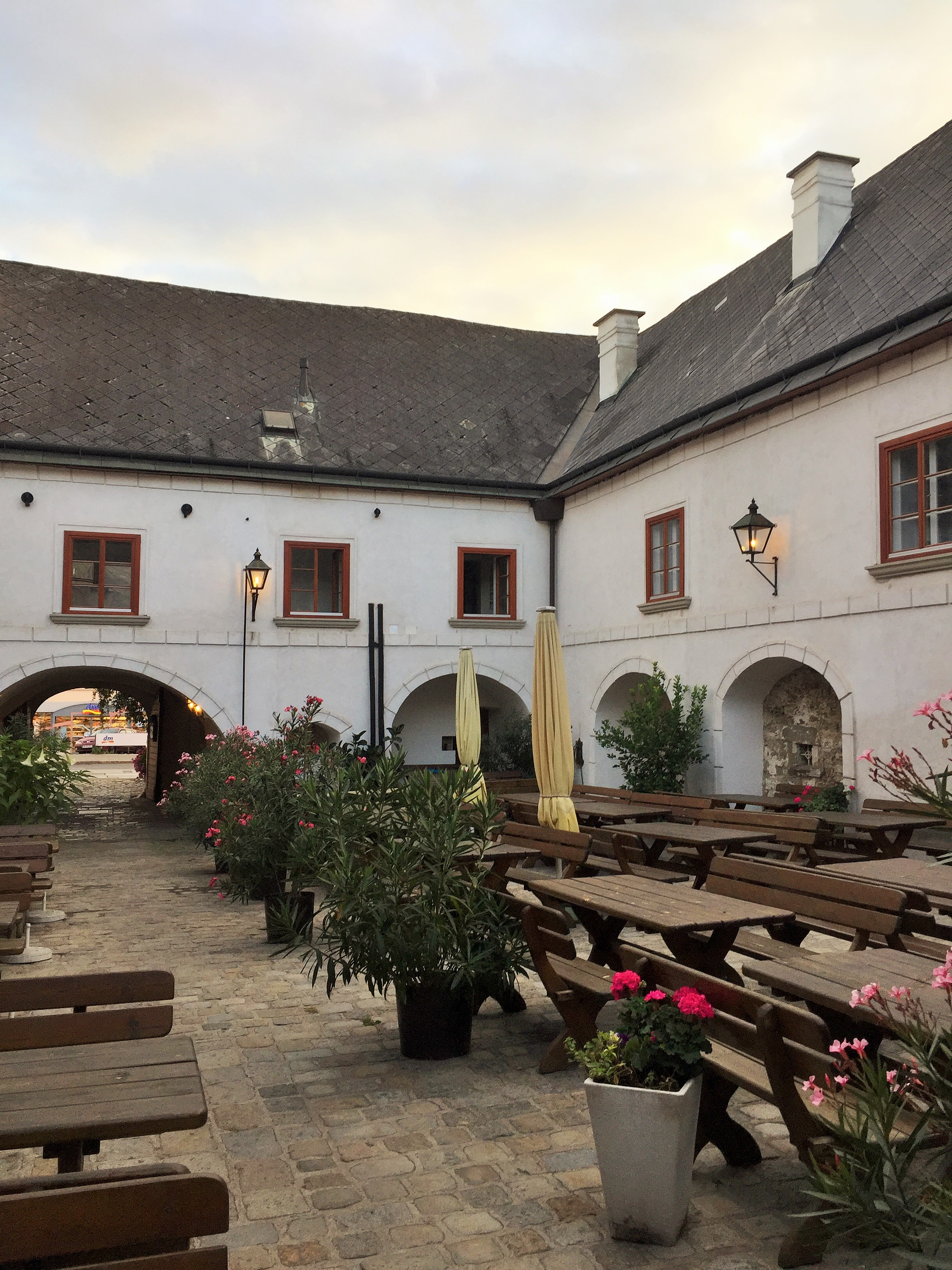
- Fuhrmannhaus, Vienna, Austria

General information
- Architectural style: Baroque
- Location: Vienna, Austria, Linzer Str. 404, 1140 Vienna
- Coordinates: 48.201937°N 16.260473°E

Fuhrmannhaus is the oldest surviving house in the west of Vienna, Austria. It is part of the 14th borough Penzing.

== History ==
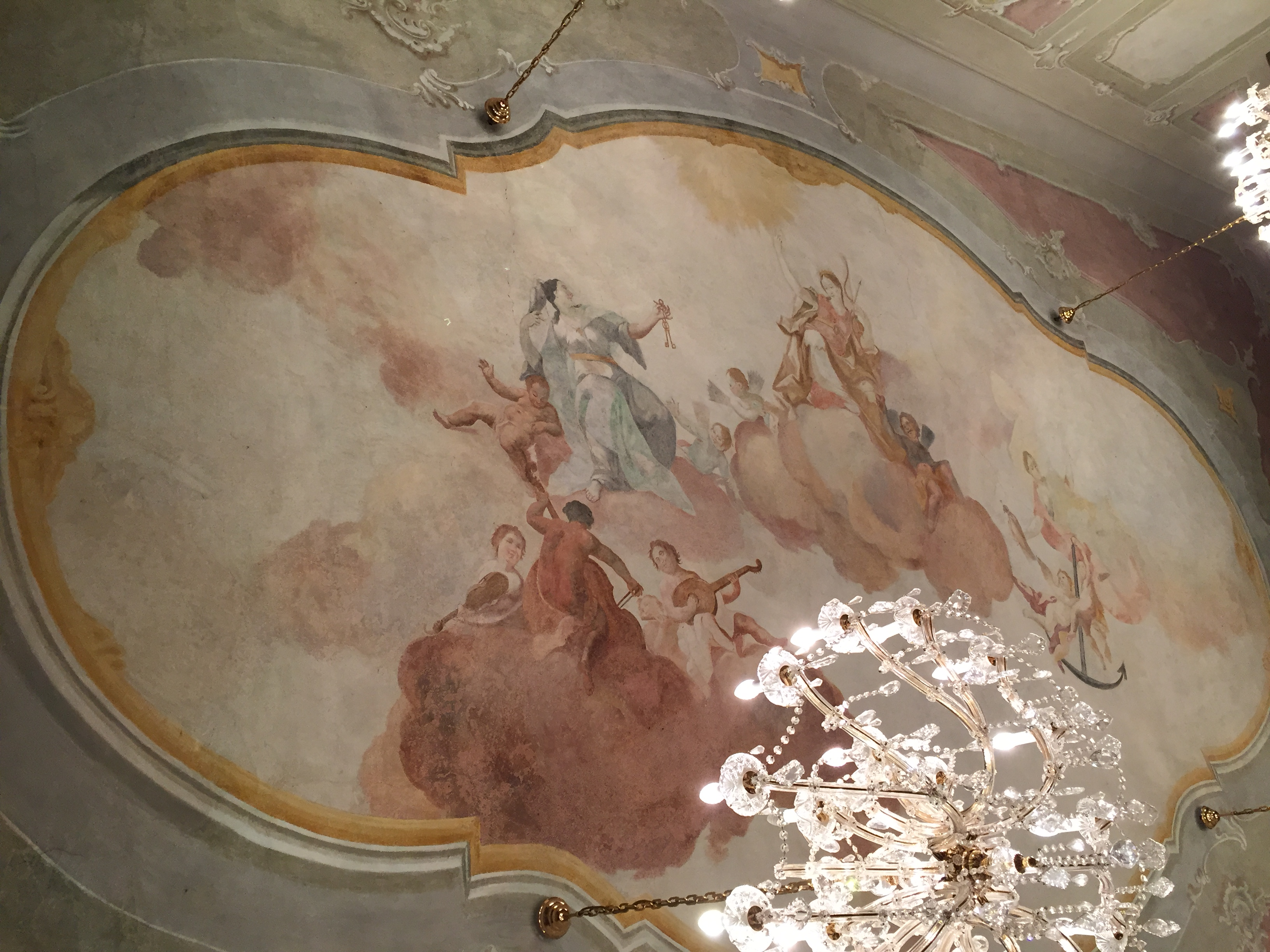
Ceiling fresco at Fuhrmannhaus

The history of the Fuhrmannhaus can be sourced back to the 17th century by a stair railing from the year 1687. This railing is part of the reconstruction after the Second Viennese Ottoman siege in 1683. At the site of the house, however, there is also evidence of a Roman watchtower and a medieval settlement, where today's Linzer Straße (Linzer Street) applies as an important transport road to Linz since the 12th century. Furthermore, a barred tiny window from the time before 1500 is still preserved in the courtyard of the building. The Fuhrmannhaus has an art-historically valuable small hall with frescoes from the late 17th century. This hall is currently used for cultural events such as classical concerts and readings. Furthermore, the building accommodates a traditional Viennese wine tavern. In the courtyard art exhibitions and different markets are held, such as farmers' and Christmas markets.

In the course of its more than three hundred years of history, the Fuhrmannhaus changed hands several times. Around 1680 it was acquired by the Barnabites who used the building as a farmyard as well as summer quarters for members of the monastery. In 1840, Franz Xaver Fuhrmann bought the house and operated a wagon company for several decades. Since then it remained in the possession of the heirs of the family Fuhrmann and thus received its present name.

== Gallery ==
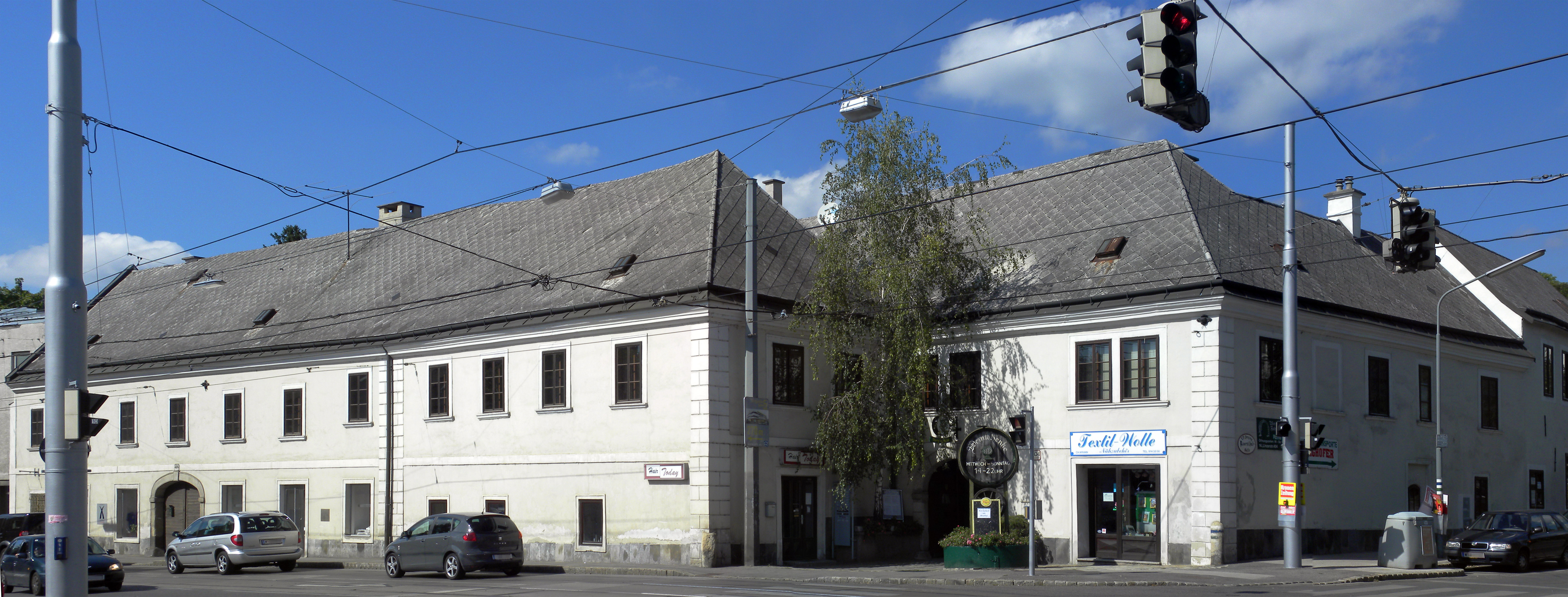
Fuhrmannhaus, front

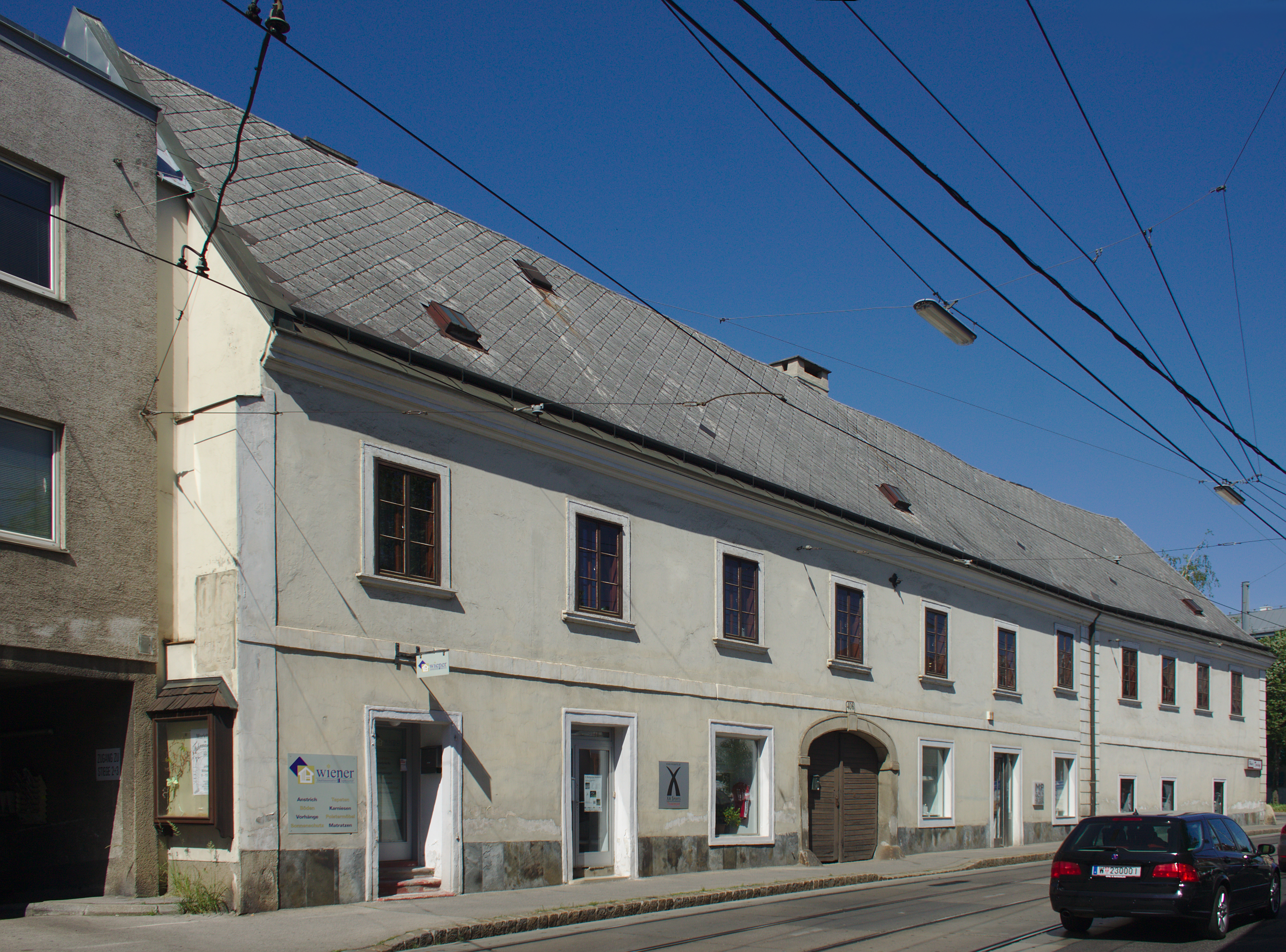
Fuhrmannhaus, back

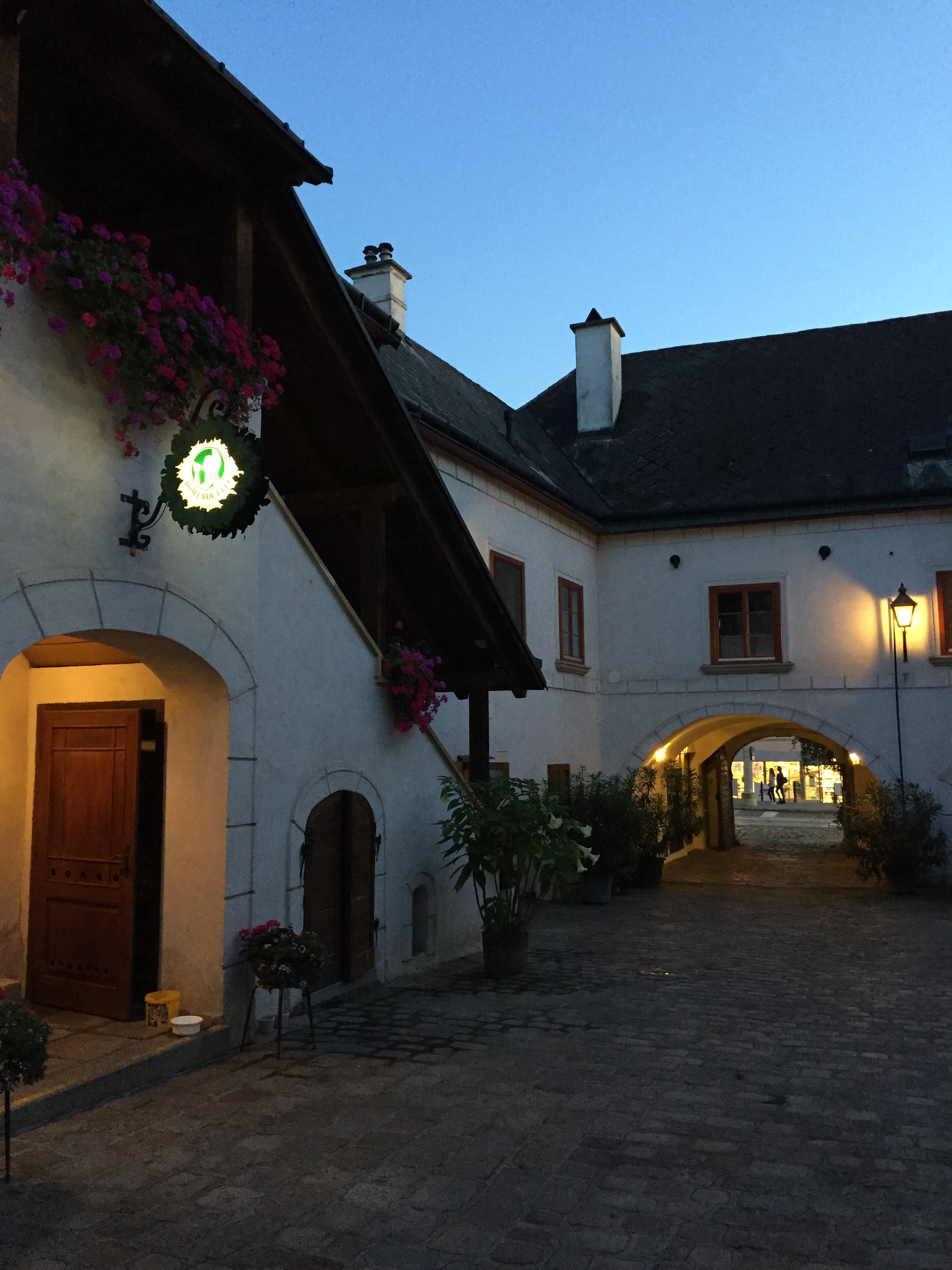
inner courtyard, evening

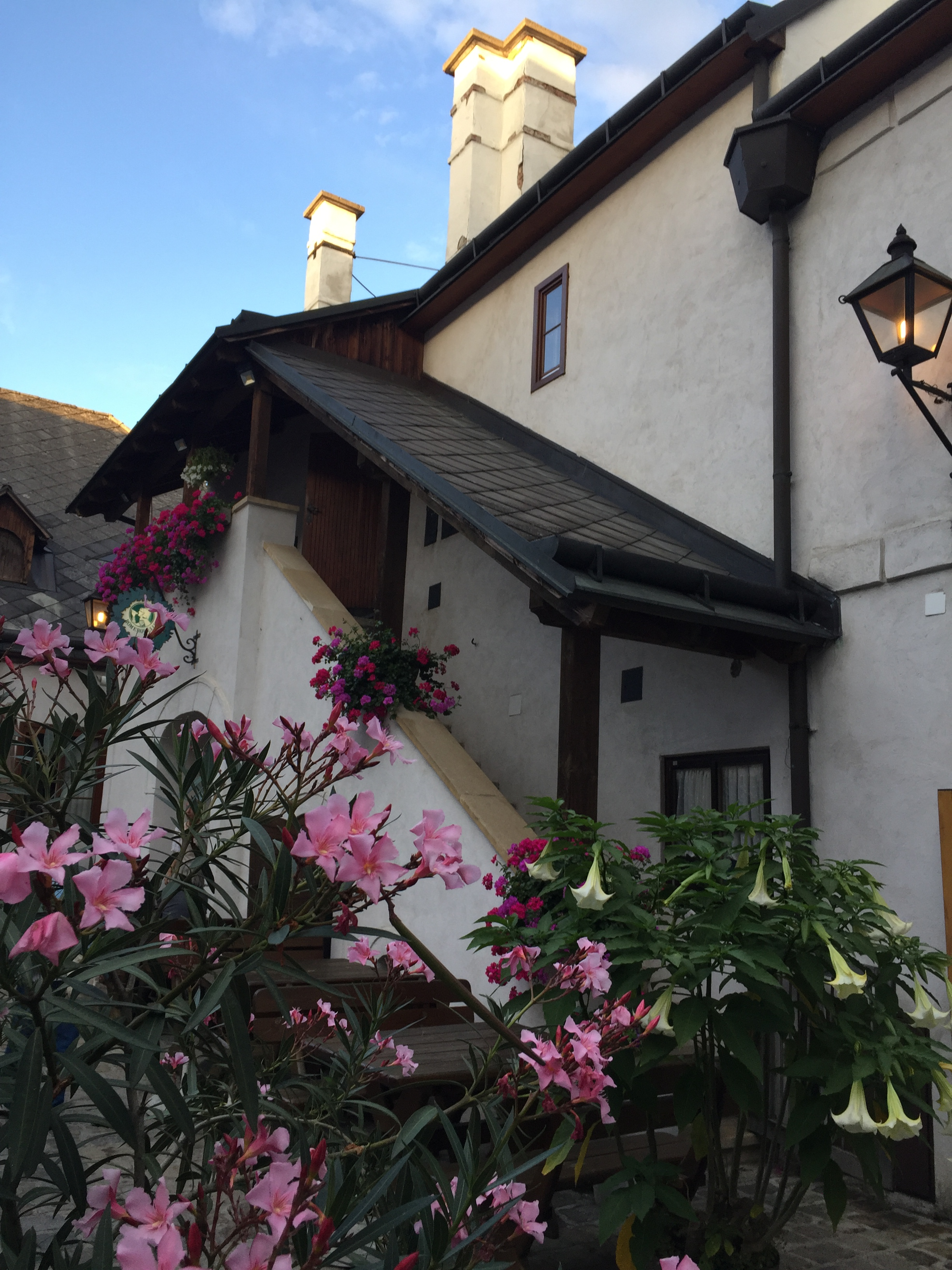
stair railing at inner courtyard

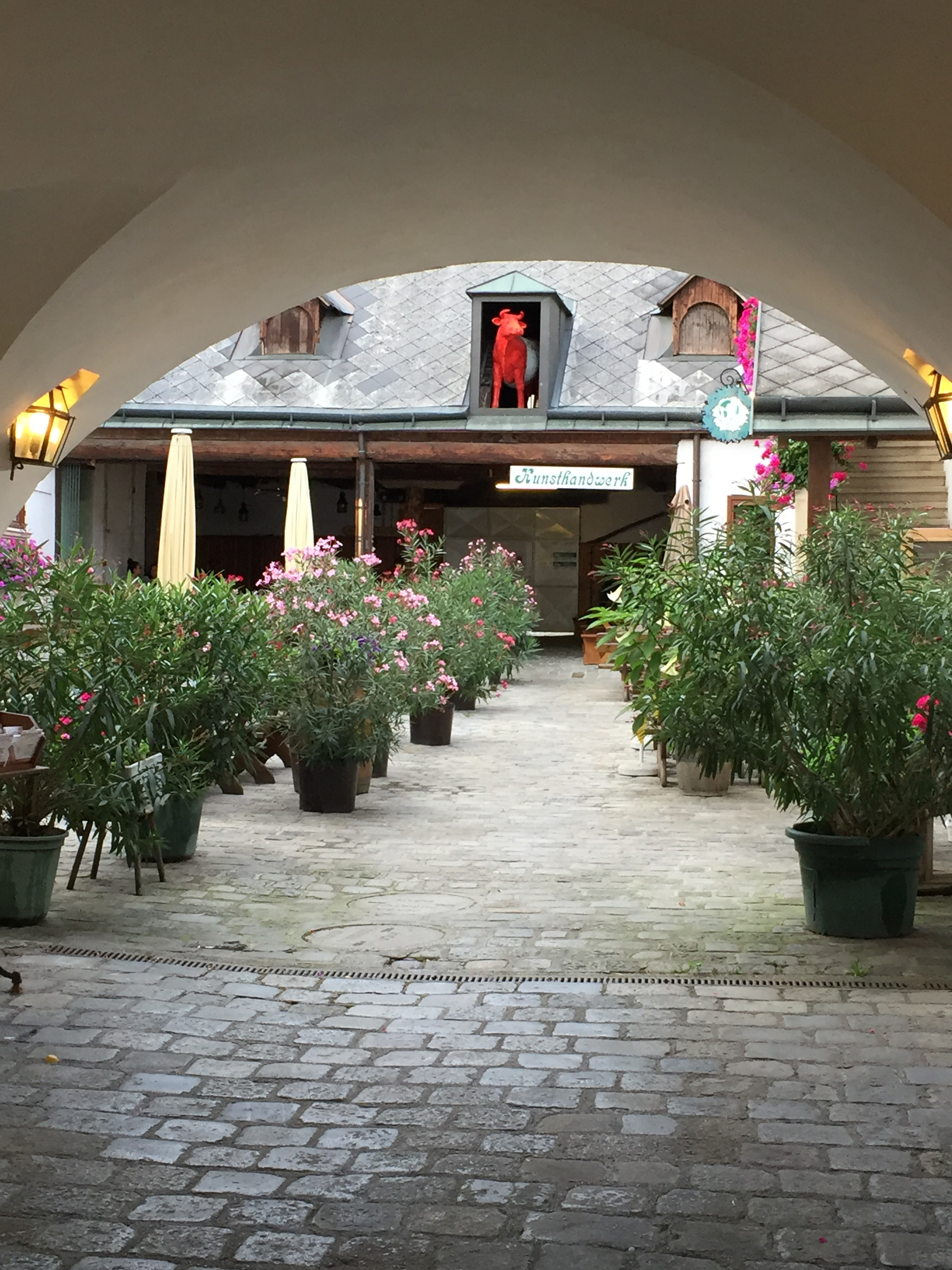
inner courtyard

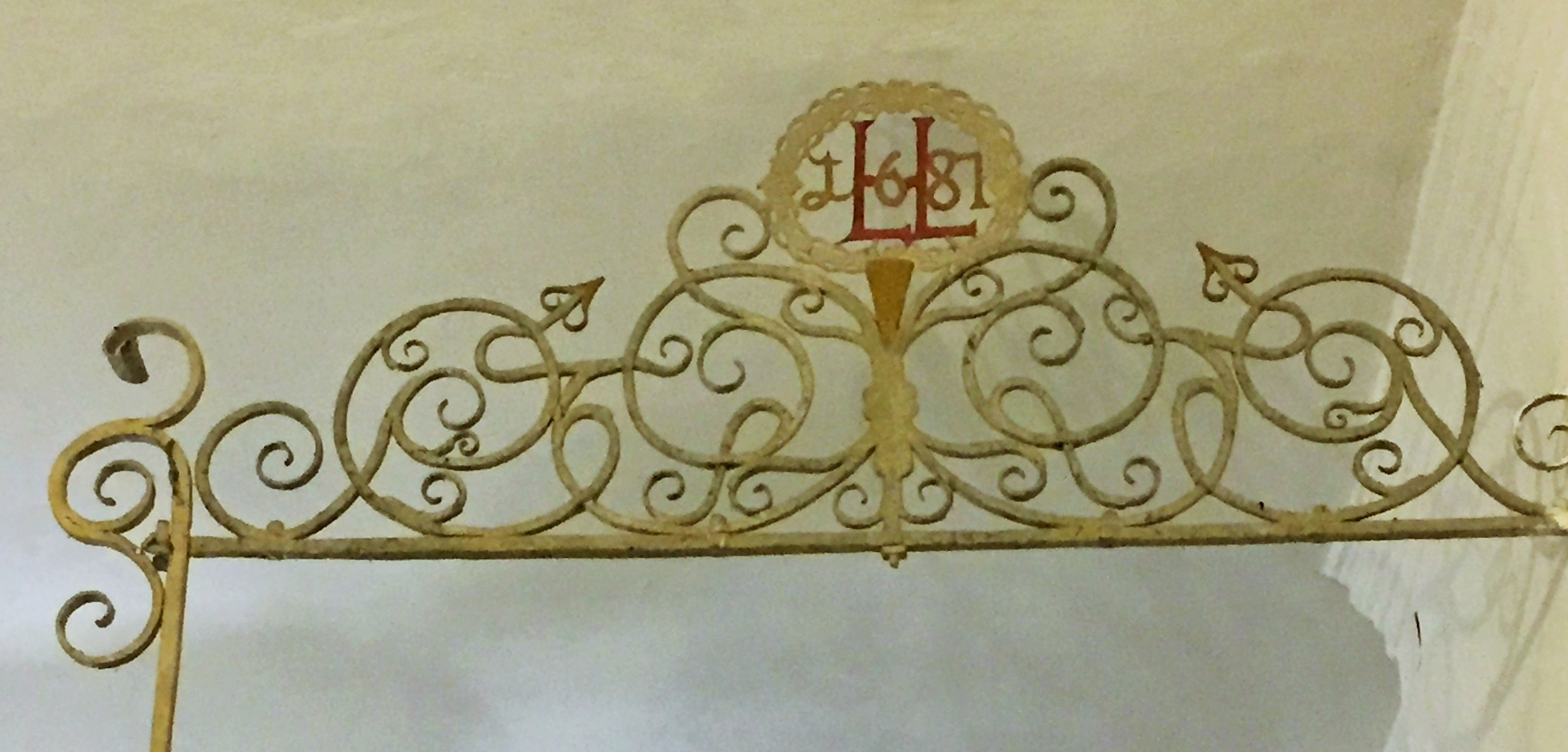
stair railing (1687), inside the house

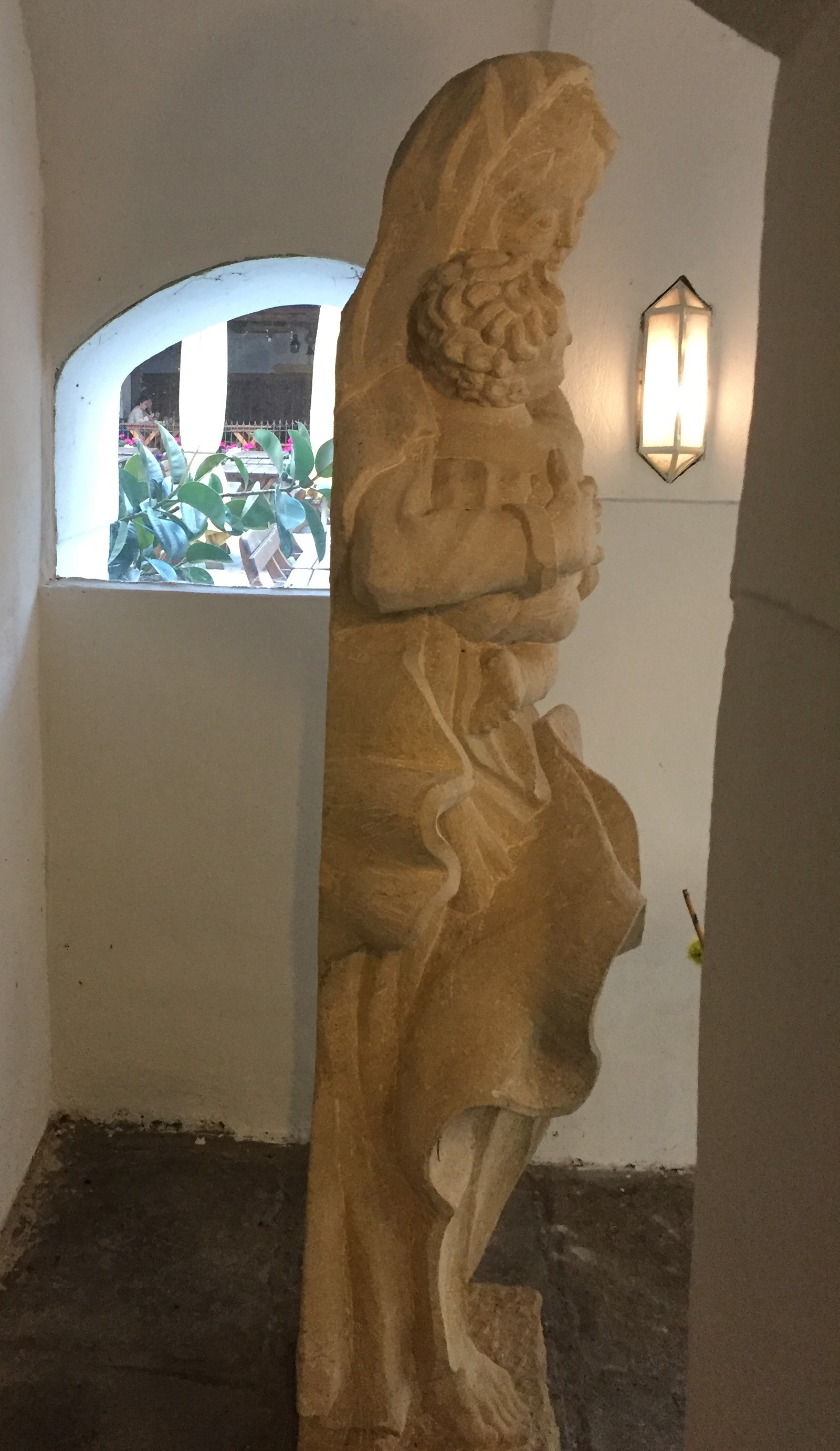
Mary with child (statue, year unknown)

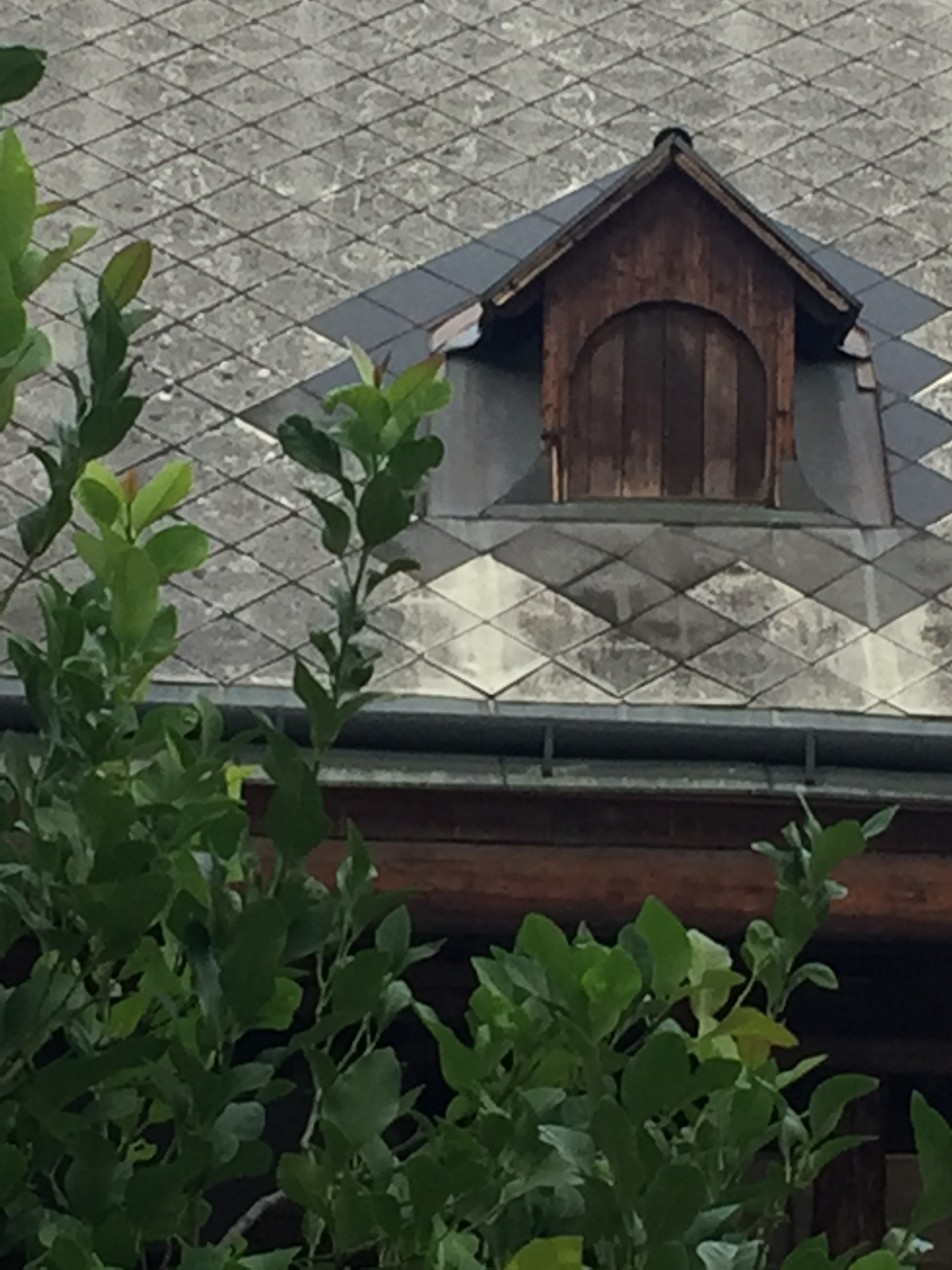
roof-light

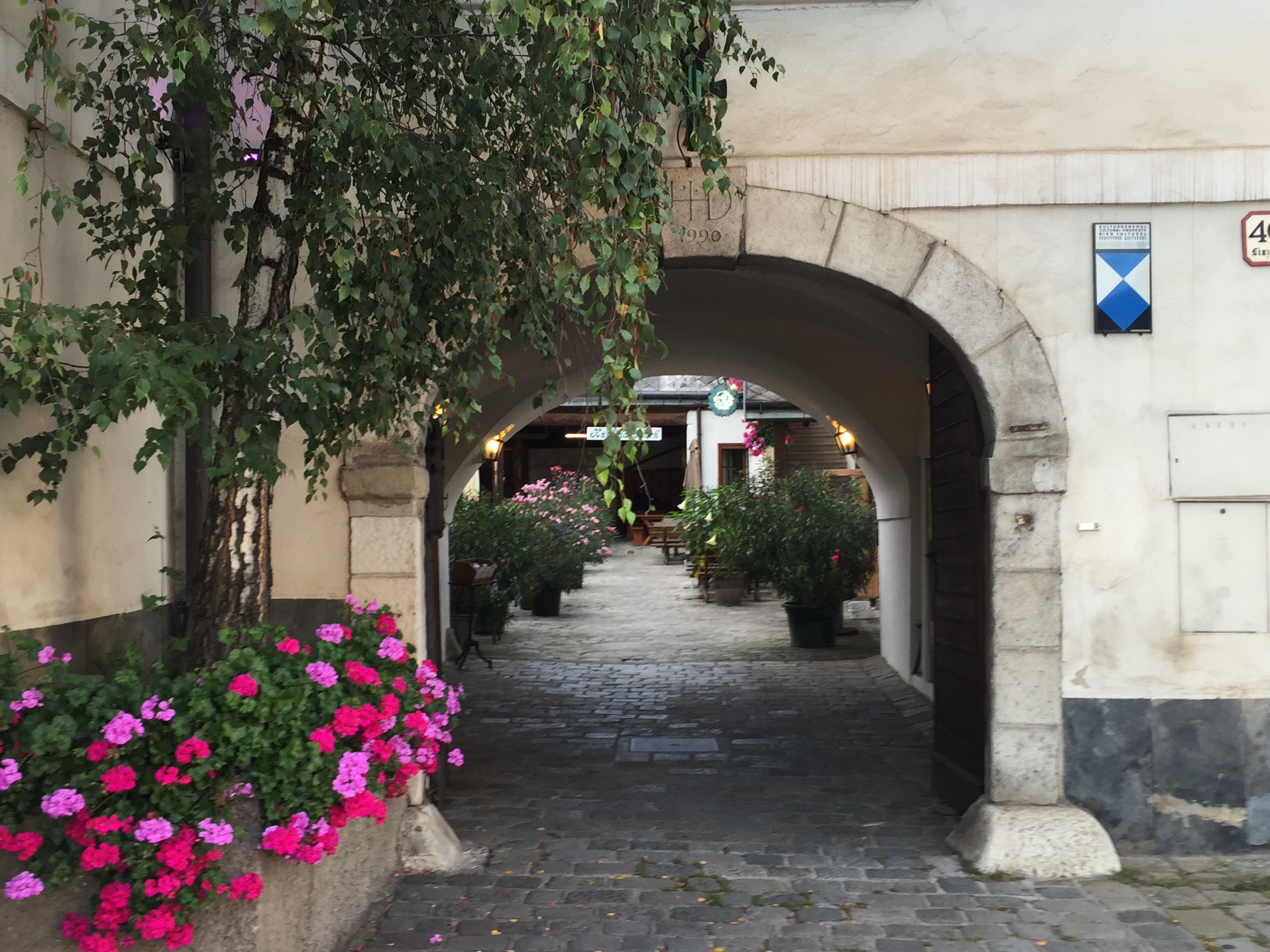
gate from outside

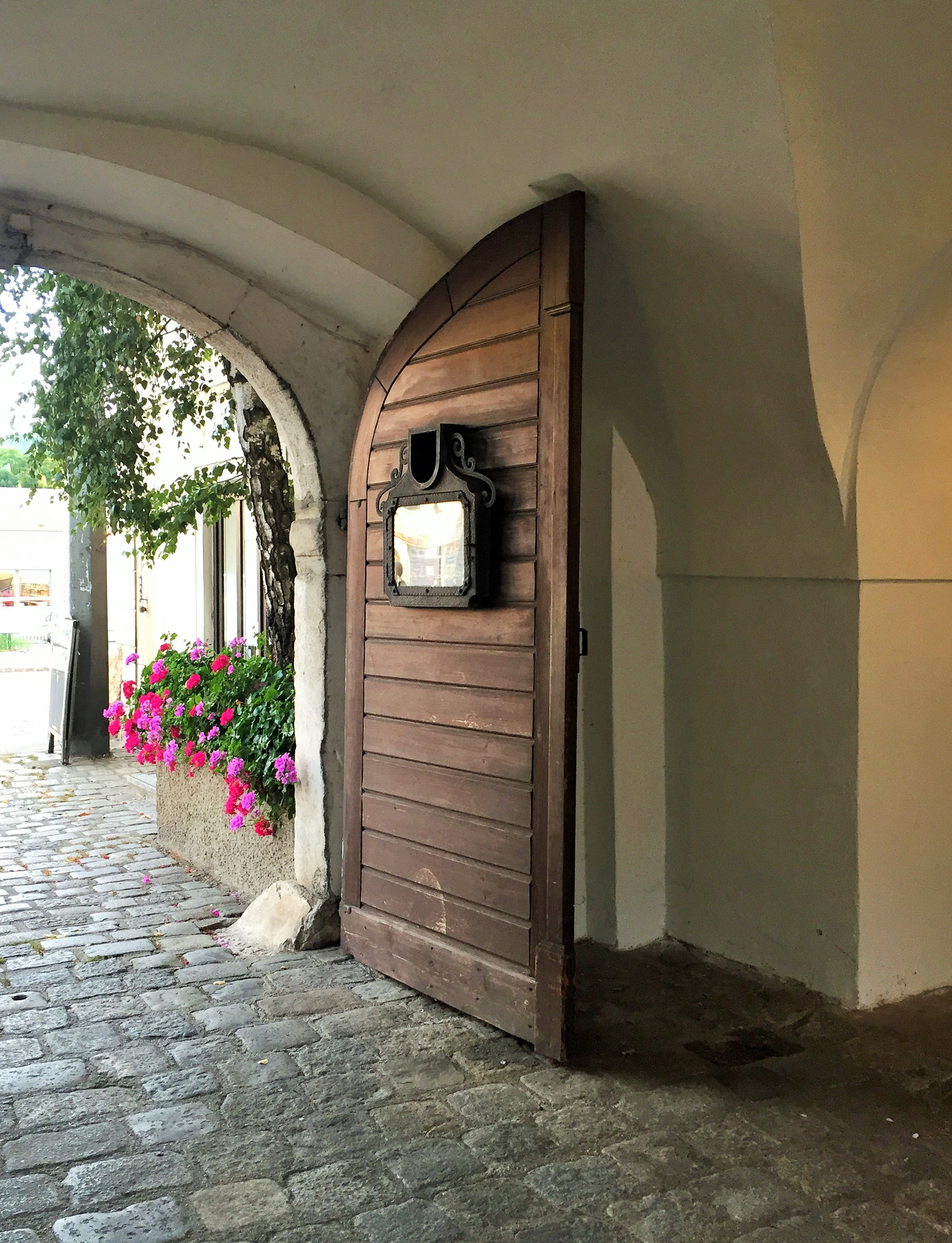
gate, inside

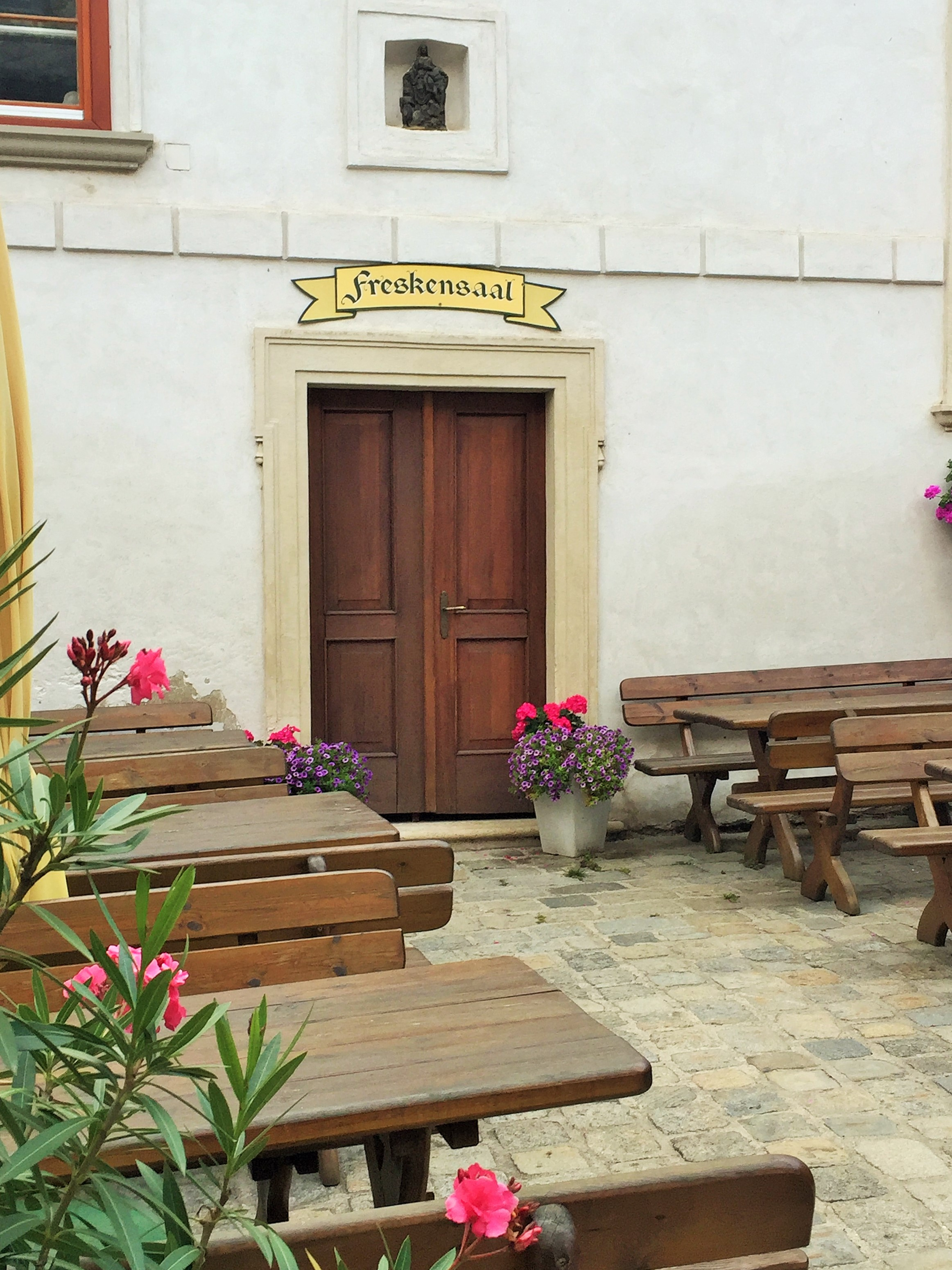
entrance to fresco hall at inner courtyard

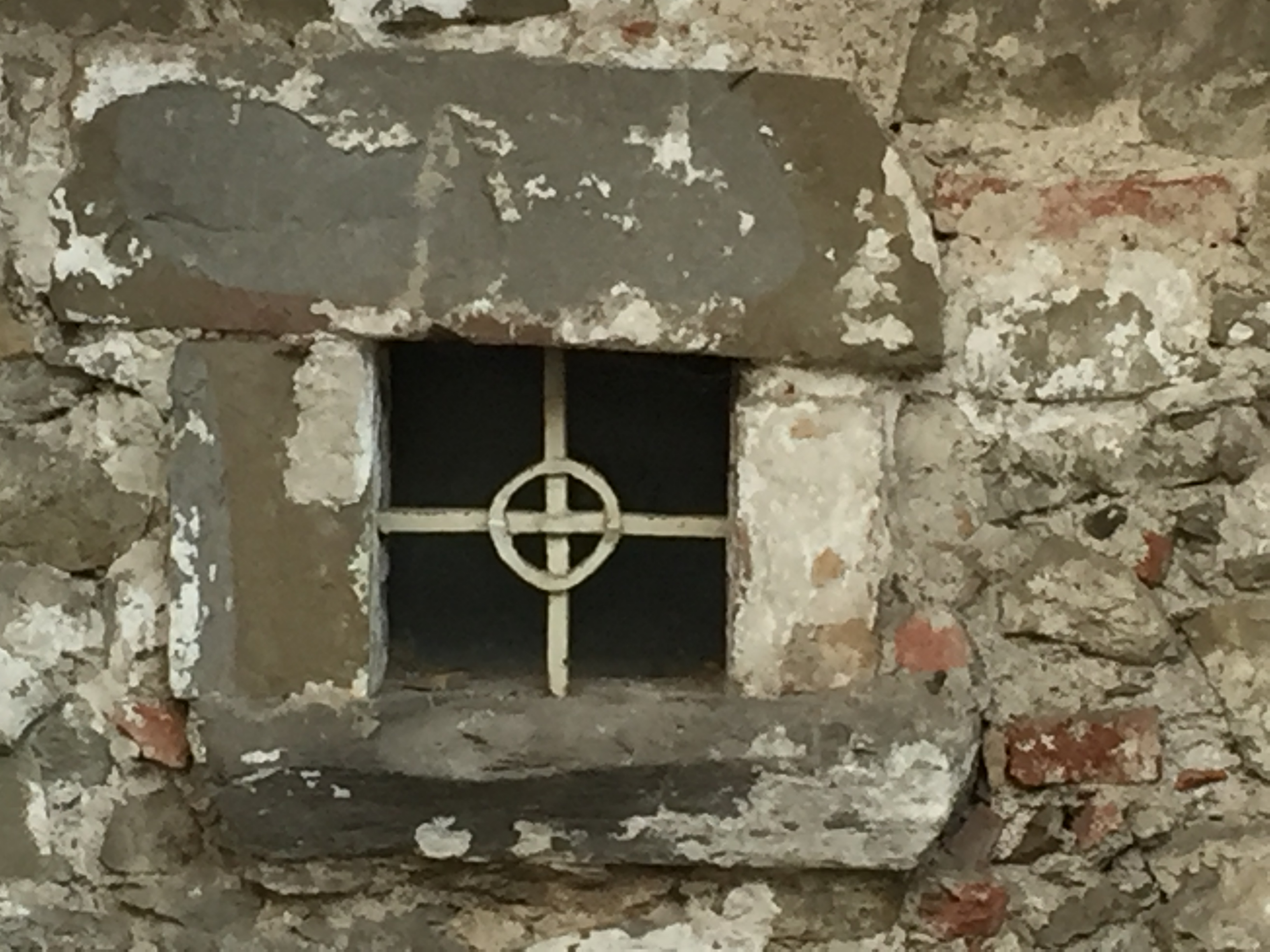
barred tiny window (before 1500)

== Literature ==
- Felix Czeike: Wiener Bezirkskulturführer, XIV. Penzing. Wien [u.a.], published by Jugend & Volk, page 43, Vienna 1980. (German).
