= Alfons Adam =

Austrian politician and lawyer (1944–2021)

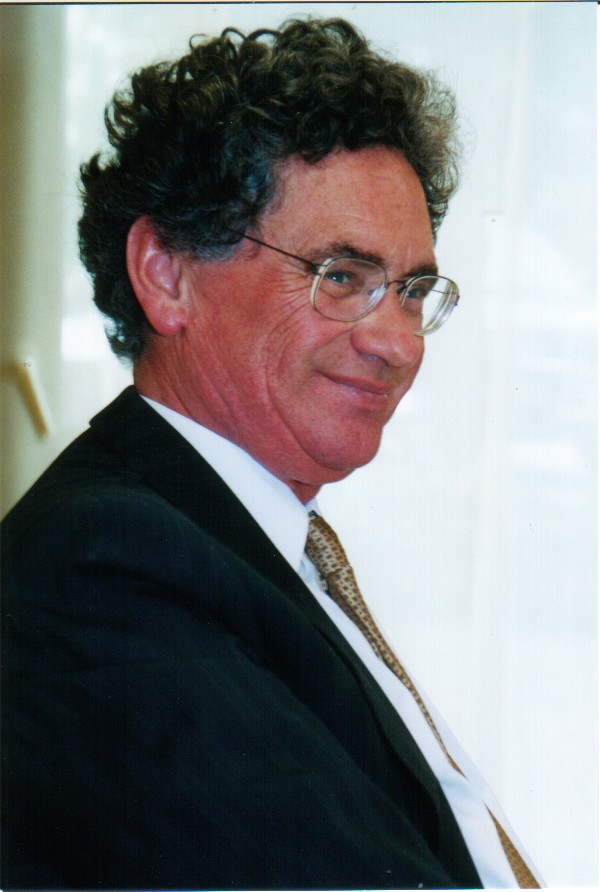
- Adam in 2008
- Born: 1 August 1944; Carinthia, Alpine and Danube Reichsgaue
- Died: 3 May 2021 (aged 76); Sankt Pölten, Austria
- Occupation: Politician

Alfons Adam (1 August 1944 – 3 May 2021) was an Austrian politician and lawyer.

== Biography ==
Adam was heavily active in anti-abortion movements and served as chairman of PRO VITA, a movement for the "right to life". On 15 October 2005, he founded the Christian Party of Austria, originally called the Christians. In the 2008 Austrian legislative election, he was the party's leading candidate, but failed to win a seat. In November 2008, he was replaced by Rudolf Gehring as party leader.

In early 2009, Adam left the party altogether and founded the Christen-Allianz the following year. In November 2013, he was fined 5400 euros for hate speech, when he made inflammatory comments about Buddhism in a mailing program. He appealed to the Higher Regional Court of Vienna, which reduced the fine to 2700 euros, half of which was suspended. On 26 January 2016, the ruling was overturned altogether by the Supreme Court and referred the case back to the Regional Court. He later founded the OKZIDENT (Association for the Promotion of the Rule of Law), of which he served as deputy chairman. He was a member of the Viennese Association of Academics.

Alfons Adam died in Sankt Pölten on 3 May 2021 at the age of 76 following a short, hard illness.
