= Baumgarten, Vienna =

Area of Penzing

Coordinates: 48°12′23″N 16°16′32″E

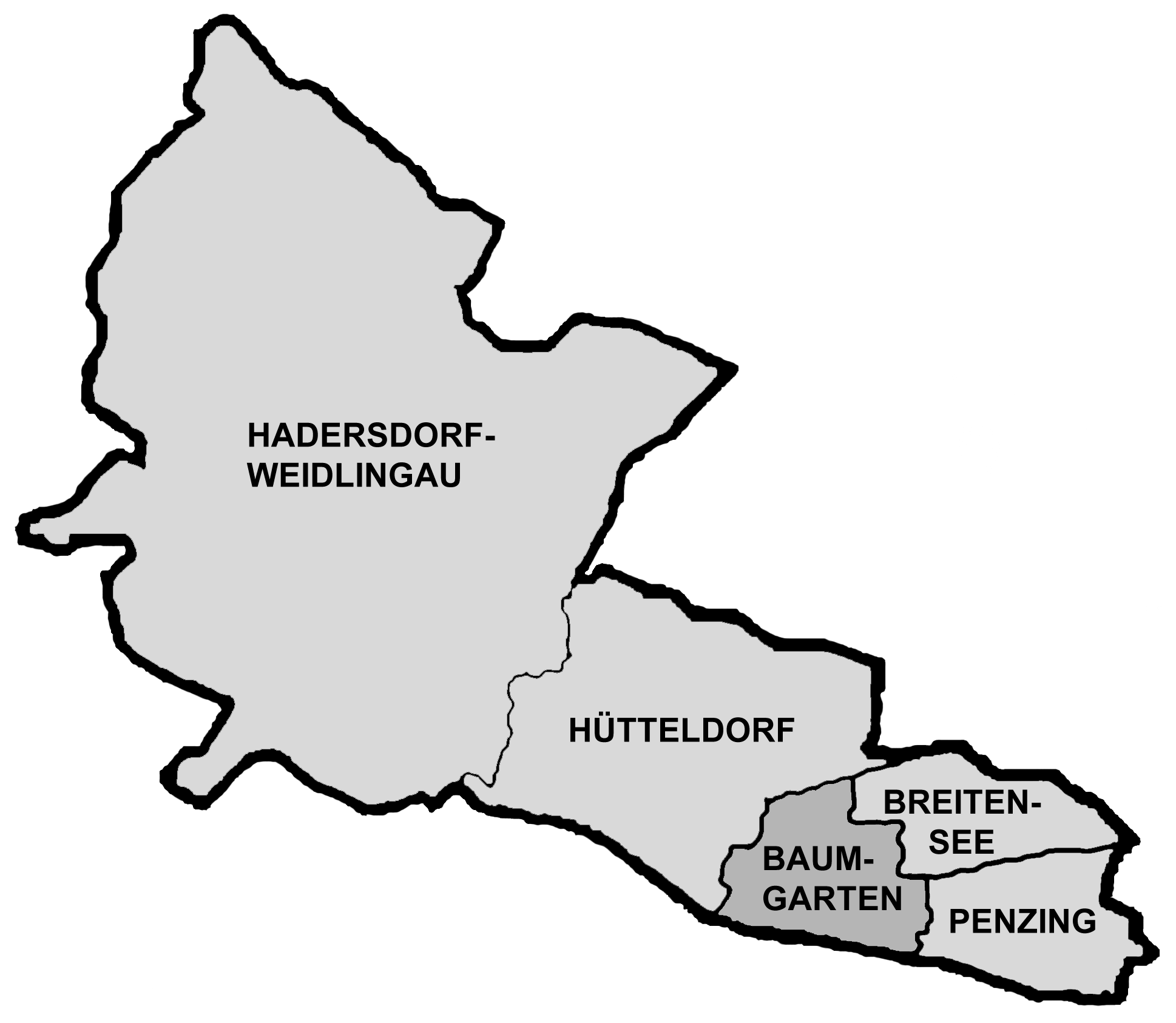
Map of Baumgarten as part of Penzing

Baumgarten (Central Bavarian: Baamgoatn) is an area of Vienna's fourteenth district, Penzing. Until 1891, it was a little village outside the city. Together with the villages Hütteldorf, Penzing, Breitensee and Hadersdorf-Weidlingau it became Vienna's 14th district. Baumgarten was first mentioned in 1200, but probably existed already in earlier times. It was originally subdivided in Ober- and Unterbaumgarten (the upper part and the lower part). In 1850, the two parts were merged into one community. Until the 19th century, it had a very rural character with farms and vineyards and it was a popular summer holiday retreat for the citizens of Vienna. Some of the richer summer guests had built nice summer residences in this area. One of them was known as the "Baumgarten Castle", which was demolished in 1890 and a school was built instead. Right opposite it is the "Baumgarten Casino" that still hosts music and dance events.

The artist Gustav Klimt was born in Baumgarten, Linzerstraße 247. The one-story house was torn down in 1966 and replaced by apartment buildings. The commemorative plaque that was originally mounted on the house is now stored at the district museum of Penzing.

== Literature ==
- Haberhauer, Günther; Weber, Dolores; Poczesniok, Roman Peter (2022). Baumgarten an der Wien: weitere Geschichtchen und Geschichten (in German). Roman Peter Poczesniok. ISBN 978-3-200-08315-8
- Wohlrab, Hertha (1985). Penzing: Geschichte des 14. Wiener Gemeindebezirkes und seiner alten Orte (in German). Jugend und Volk. ISBN 978-3-224-16209-9
