= Otto Pendl =

Austrian politician (1951–2021)

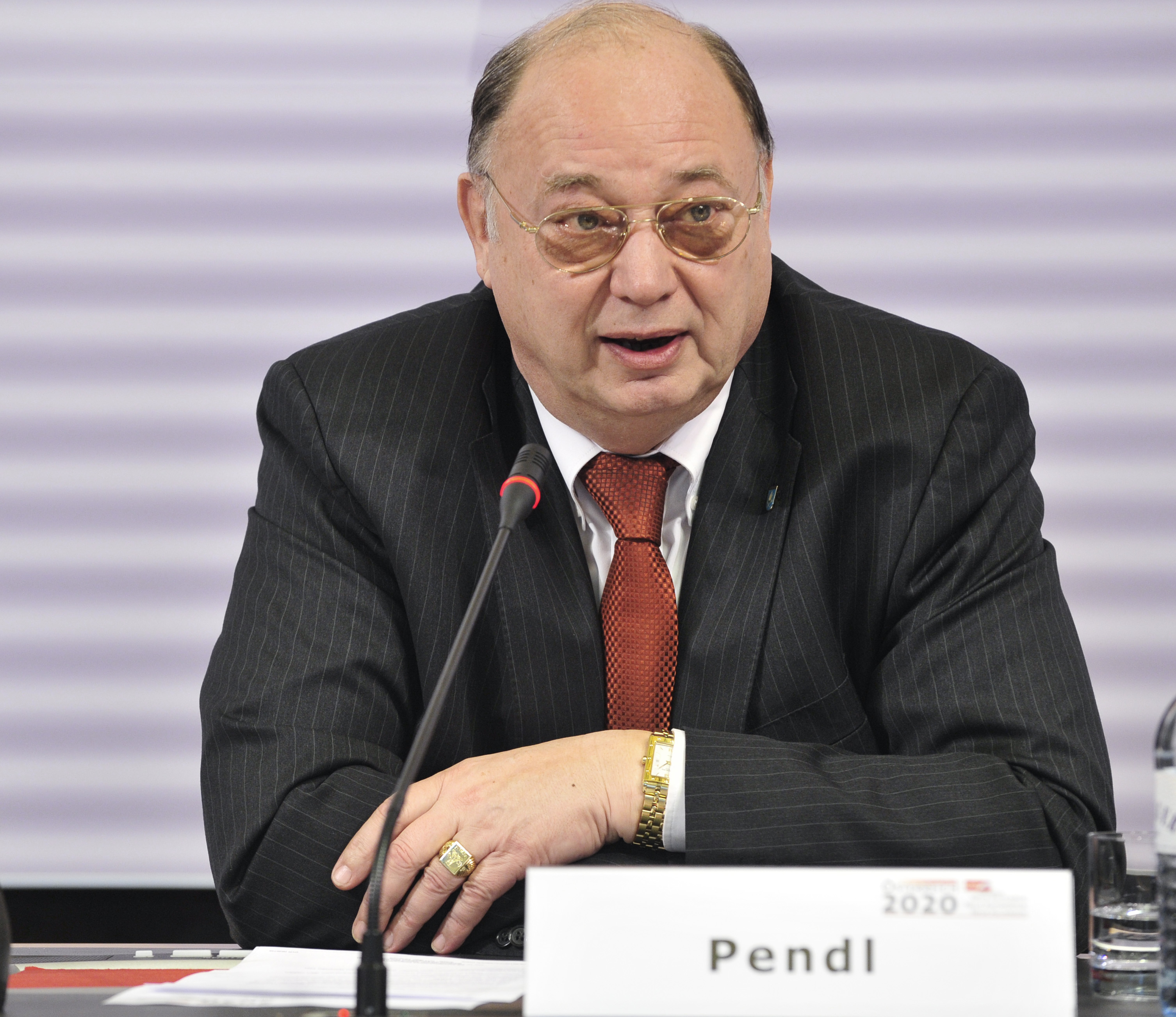
- Pendl in 2011

Member of the National Council of Austria
- In office 1998–2017

Personal details
- Born: 29 October 1951 Trumau, Austria
- Died: 10 November 2021 (aged 70)
- Party: SPÖ

Otto Pendl (29 October 1951 – 10 November 2021) was an Austrian politician. A member of the Social Democratic Party of Austria, he served in the National Council from 1998 to 2017.
