= Inge Ginsberg =

Austrian-Swiss author and singer (1922–2021)

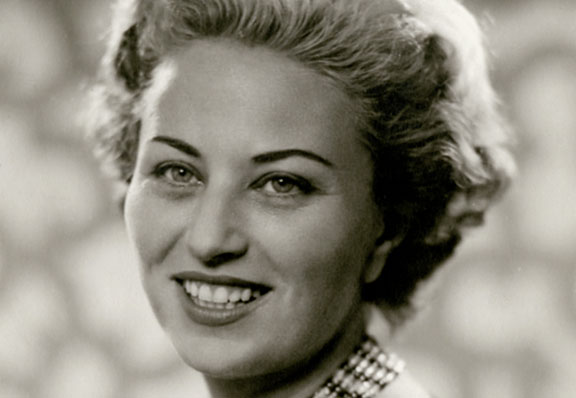
- Inge Ginsberg in 1961
- Born: Ingeborg Neufeld; 27 January 1922
- Died: 20 July 2021 (aged 99)
- Known for: World War II Italian resistance movement; song writing; heavy metal singing

Ingeborg "Inge" Ginsberg (27 January 1922 – 20 July 2021) was an Austrian-Swiss author and singer. While in Switzerland during World War II, she was involved with the Italian resistance movement.

== Early life and education ==
Ginsberg was born Ingeborg Neufeld on 27 January 1922 in Vienna, Austria, the older of two children, to Fritz Samuel Neufeld (1889–1960), a businessman, and Hildegard Neufeld (née Zwicker; 1901–1975), into an affluent Jewish family. She had a younger brother; Hans Walter Neufeld (1925–2005).

Her father was the proprietor of a freight forwarding company in Vienna. The Neufeld family could trace their Austrian monastic roots back 800 years to the Melk Abbey. Her mothers family was originally from Zittau, Saxony in Germany.

Ginsberg attended schools up to 12th grade in Vienna.

== World War II and escape ==
During the annexation of Austria by Germany in 1938, her father was sent to Dachau concentration camp. Ginsberg secured his released through bribery. In 1939, he was among the Jewish passengers on board the MS St. Louis during its journey to Cuba and back.

In 1942 her mother was able to flee across the Alps to Switzerland with the two children and Ginsberg's boyfriend Otto Kollman after surviving in Vienna for years. They managed to avoid deportation as her brother and fiancée were "essential workers", employed as grave diggers. However, the threat still loomed over them, and her mother sold her jewellery collection to an Austrian count who arranged for them to be smuggled to Switzerland. They were first in the Adliswil reception camp and later in several labour camps in Lucerne, Langenbruck and Lugano.

== Personal life ==
After the war Ginsberg married her first husband, Otto Kollmann, who had fled from Vienna with her. They had one child together. In the following years they lived mainly in Zürich and worked together in their musical careers. They moved to the USA together. In 1956 she separated from him and worked as a journalist for the weekly newspaper Weltwoche in Zürich. She invested some of her wealth in the stock market and bought two properties in New York.

At the invitation of the Weizmann Institute, she was able to fly as a guest on the first flight of an El Al plane from Zürich to Tel Aviv. In Israel she met her second husband, Hans Kruger and they married in 1960. He was the manager of a luxury hotel, the Dan Hotel Tel Aviv. She had originally planned to lead a pioneering life in a kibbutz. She bought an apartment in Tel Aviv with the proceeds from the sale of three farms near Haifa. Her far-sighted grandmother, a lifelong Zionist, had acquired them in 1936.

In Israel she also met her third husband, also a Jewish emigrant from Vienna. She moved to Ecuador with Kurt Ginsberg and married him after a difficult divorce from Hans Kruger in 1972. She wrote several books based on her time in Ecuador. The couple lived alternately in Quito, Tel Aviv and Switzerland and later moved to New York for health reasons. When her husband died in 1999, she continued to live in Switzerland and New York.

In 2020, Ginsberg survived a COVID-19 infection. She died 20 July 2021.

== Espionage career ==
In 1944 Otto Kollmann, her first husband, worked as a bar pianist in Cafe Federale in Lugano. He was recruited by the American secret service Office of Strategic Services to listen to the German-speaking guests. Through his recommendation, Ginsberg was hired as housekeeper at the diplomatic villa, Villa Westphal, used as a safe house by resistance fighters. The villa's residents were mostly Americans, but also Italians who came and went across the nearby border to fight the German occupiers and the Italian fascists. Inge was actively involved in smuggling weapons from Ticino into the war zone and in smuggling the wounded from Italy into Switzerland. This happened with the knowledge of Major Max Waibel, Head of Intelligence Section 1 of the Swiss Army.

At the beginning of May 1945 Ginsberg witnessed a secret operation through being at Villa Westphal. It involved SS General Karl Wolff, commander in chief of the German troops in northern Italy. This event, called "Operation Sunrise", in which the Swiss secret service was also involved, resulted in a truce that ended the war in northern Italy prior to the overall German surrender on 8 May 1945. It was part of a deal between the Germans and the Americans, thanks to which it was also possible to save Italian cultural treasures such as da Vinci's "Last Supper" in Milan from the threat of destruction.

In May 1945, with the start of Cold War in Europe, Ginsberg and her husband ended their activities as spies.

== Music career ==
In 1949 Ginsberg and her first husband were hired as house composers by the Swiss company Musikvertrieb. Her husband composed ten songs each week and one or two were then selected for use. The performers were well-known stars such as Vico Torriani and Lys Assia. The company Musikvertrieb was later integrated into Teldec (Telefunken-Decca Schallplatten GmbH). Through the mediation of a friend, the couple were also able to sell their music to the Gloria film company. Well-known songs were, for example, The cowboy always has a girl, Madeleine or Sing, sing Gitano.

In 1955, they were recruited by Capitol Records to write songs for Hollywood and so moved to the USA. The couple did not feel at home there, despite singers such as Dean Martin and Nat King Cole recording their work. Her husband wanted to write symphonies and, following an argument about him not writing music to the lyrics of what became the well-known song Que Sera, Sera, Ginsberg divorced him in 1956.

Ginsberg started a second music career in 2013 when she applied for the Eurovision Song Contest 2014 with a song about suicides among young people. This was eliminated in a preliminary selection round for the Swiss entry.

In 2015, Ginsberg wrote and performed another song, Totenköpfchen, with the metal band Inge and the Tritone Kings. It had the chorus "Sing and eat and drink and laugh, then the devil goes to hell". It was placed last in the public vote in the Swiss preliminary round for the Eurovision Song Contest 2015. Ginsberg and the Tritone Kings also put a new song forward unsuccessfully for the Swiss contribution to the Eurovision Song Contest 2016.

Ginsberg entered Switzerland's Got Talent aged 94 with a heavy metal number and became a sensation. She said she wanted to demonstrate that older people have a lot to contribute to society and should not be excluded from life. Her singing performances on YouTube has also led to widespread attention, being dubbed "Heavy Metal Grandma".

== Works ==
Ginsberg wrote several books. These included:

- The partisan villa. Memories of escape, secret service and numerous hits (in German Die Partisanenvilla. Erinnerungen an Flucht, Geheimdienst und zahlreiche Schlager) Edited by Manfred Flügge. DTV, Munich 2008, ISBN 978-3-423-24680-4.
- No Flowers in the Rainforest Gray Rabbit Publishing, New York 2013, ISBN 978-1-61720-741-9 (as Inge Ginsberg-Kruger).
- A life story. The Poems of Inge Ginsberg Gray Rabbit Publishing, New York 2014, ISBN 978-1-62755-632-3.
