= Christine Haidegger =

Austrian poet and writer (1942–2021)

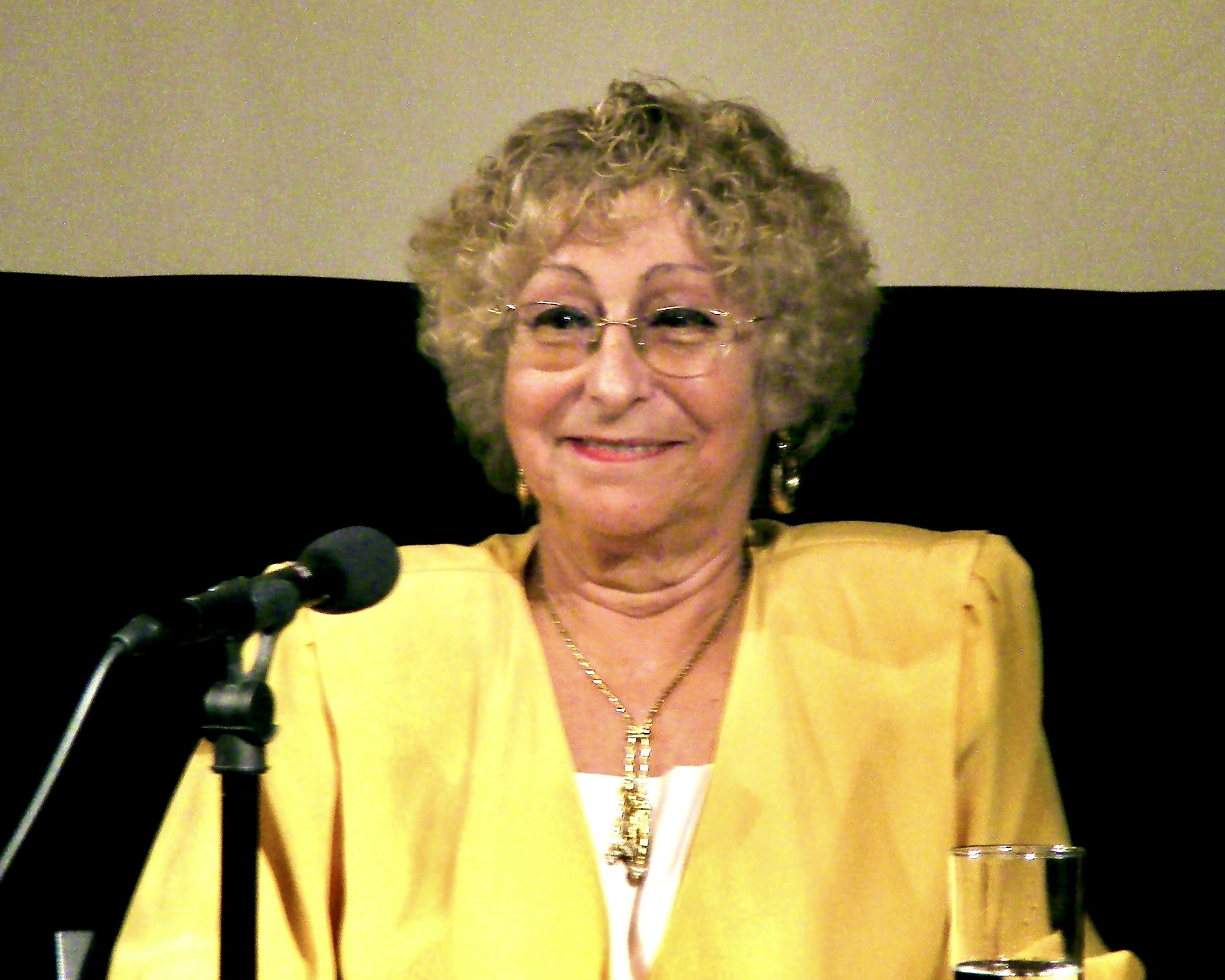
- Haidegger in 2012
- Born: 27 February 1942; Dortmund, Westphalia, Prussia, Germany
- Died: 5 December 2021 (aged 79)
- Occupations: Writer; Poet
- Organisation: Salzburg Authors' Group
- Notable work: Zum Fenster hinaus (Mama Dear)
- Awards: Salzburg Poetry Prize
- Website: www.christinehaidegger.at

Christine Haidegger (27 February 1942 – 5 December 2021) was an Austrian poet and writer whose memoir Zum Fenster hinaus was translated into English as Mama Dear. She was influential in the Salzburg literary scene.

== Biography ==
Haidegger was born to Austrian parents in Dortmund, Germany, and grew up in Upper Austria after World War II. She lived in Salzburg since the mid-1950s. After getting her Matura diploma, she spent considerable time in England, France, Italy, and the U.S. She worked as a freelance writer from 1964 onward. Her first novel Zum Fenster hinaus describes a post-war childhood in Austria. Haidegger founded the Salzburg Authors' Group (SAG) and was honorary member. She was also significantly involved in the development of the Salzburg House of Literature. Haidegger published numerous novels, short stories, travelogues, plays and poems. In 1978, Haidegger took part in the Ingeborg Bachmann Prize in Klagenfurt. In 1991, she was writer-in-residence at Roanoke College in Virginia, US.

== Personal life ==
Haidegger was married to Eberhard Haidegger. They had a daughter, Christina-Maria, who also became a writer and published under the pen name Meta Merz. After her daughter died in 1989, Haidegger managed the estate and initiated the Meta Merz Literature Prize.

Haidegger died on 5 December 2021, at the age of 79.

== Works ==
Haidegger published works of many genres, and edited works by her daughter Meta Merz. The jury of the Salzburg Poetry Award wrote in 2005 that her texts render convincingly both snapshots of seasons, nature and life, and existential experiences such as grief, loneliness, time and transience in an unpretentious language particularly distinguished by its apparent simplicity and careful imagery. ("Alle Texte Haideggers verstehen es überzeugend, sowohl Momentaufnahmen von Jahreszeiten, der Natur und des Lebens als auch existenzielle Erfahrungen wie Trauer, Einsamkeit, Zeit und Vergänglichkeit in einer nicht-manierierten Sprache wiederzugeben, die sich besonders durch ihre scheinbare Einfachheit und behutsame Bildhaftigkeit auszeichnet.")

=== As author ===
- Entzauberte Gesichte. Poetry. Darmstadt: Bläschke, 1976. ISBN 978-3-87561-472-5
- Zum Fenster hinaus. Eine Nachkriegskindheit. Novel. Reinbek: Rowohlt, 1979. ISBN 978-3-7013-1239-9
- Adam / Adam. Novel. Vienna: Verlag der Österreichischen Staatsdruckerei, 1985. ISBN 978-3-7046-0033-2
- Atem. Stille. Poetry. Baden: Grasl, 1993. ISBN 978-3-85098-213-9
- Schöne Landschaft. Collected prose. Salzburg: edition prolit, 1993. ISBN 978-3-901243-02-8
- Amerikanische Verwunderung. Skizzenbuch zu einem Aufenthalt. Short prose. Vienna: Wiener Frauenverlag, 1993. ISBN 978-3-900399-84-9
- Cajuns, Cola, Cadillac. American Sightseeing. Vienna: Milena, 1997. ISBN 978-3-85286-050-3
- Weiße Nächte. Poetry. Baden near Vienna: Grasl, 2002. ISBN 978-3-85098-258-0
- Mama Dear. English, translation of Zum Fenster hinaus. Riverside (CA), 2002. ISBN 978-1-57241-103-6
- Haidegger, Christine (August 2006). Fremde Mutter (in German). Vienna: Müller. ISBN 978-3-7013-1119-4.
- Herz. Landschaft. Licht. Poetry. Salzburg: Otto Müller, 2009. ISBN 978-3-7013-1157-6
- Translation into German of poetry "Riflessione" by Fabio Recchia, Levico (Italian), 2009.
- Texas Travels. Travel narratives. Vienna: Der Apfel, 2010. ISBN 978-3-85450-033-9
- Herzland. Poetry CD, 2013.
- Zum Fenster hinaus. Eine Nachkriegskindheit. Reissued. Salzburg, Vienna: Otto Müller Verlag, 2016. ISBN 978-3-7013-1239-9
- Nach dem Fest. Stories. Salzburg, Vienna: Otto Müller Verlag, 2018. ISBN 978-3-7013-1263-4
- Von der Zärtlichkeit der Wörter, poetry collection, 2020 ISBN 978-3-7013-1277-1

=== As editor ===
- Meta Merz: Erotik der Distanz. Vienna, 1990. ISBN 978-3-900399-47-4.
- Meta Merz: Metaphysik der Begierde. Vienna, 1996. ISBN 978-3-85286-027-5.

== Awards ==
- 1984 Culture Prize of the City of Salzburg
- 1984 Georg Rendl Literature Prize
- 1990 Salzburg State Culture Prize
- 2002 Max von der Grün Prize
- 2002 Gold medal of merit of the State of Salzburg
- 2005 Salzburg Poetry Prize
- 2012 City seal in silver of Salzburg
