= Gertrude Pressburger =

Austrian Holocaust survivor (1927–2021)

Gertrude Pressburger (11 July 1927 – 31 December 2021) was an Austrian Holocaust survivor.

== Life ==
Gertrude Pressburger was born in Vienna, Austria. She and her two younger brothers grew up under modest circumstances. Her father was a carpenter. The family converted from Judaism to Roman Catholicism in the early 1930s, but this would not protect the family of five. Immediately after the Anschluss, Gertrude and her brother were no longer allowed to visit the school and the father lost his job. Without ever having been politically active, her father was arrested and tortured by the Gestapo "for underground activity as a communist".

After his release, the family managed by chance to get a visa for Yugoslavia. The trip ended in September 1938 in Zagreb and went from there via Italy, from where France was to be controlled, but mislang. Back in Yugoslavia, the family was arrested in 1944 and deported to Auschwitz.

Her mother and both brothers were murdered on arrival, and her father died on the way to another camp. After the liberation, Gertrude Pressburger arrived in Sweden via Denmark, where Concentration Camp survivors were cared for on the initiative of the Swedish king. On her 18th birthday, she met Bruno Kreisky, who at the time was chairman of the "Austrian Association in Sweden". The return to Vienna was initially not easy. The Belghofergasse in Vienna-Meidling, the old place of residence of the family, was never again entered.

== Death ==
Pressburger died in New Year's Eve 2021, at the age of 94.

== Public work ==
She got known as Frau Gertrude when she warned in a video message against exclusion and hatred in the 2016 presidential election in Austria. The trigger was her annoyance over the statement of the FPÖ leader and now Vice-Chancellor Heinz-Christian Strache that "in the medium term, a civil war is not unlikely". The video was clicked and shared millions of times.

== Publications ==
- Gertrude Pressburger, Marlene Groihofer: Gelebt, erlebt, überlebt Autobiographie, Verlag Zsolnay 2018 ISBN 978-3-552-05890-3
