= Ferdinand Kolarik =

Austrian footballer (1937–2021)

Personal information
- Date of birth: 4 October 1937
- Place of birth: Dürnkrut, Austria
- Date of death: 6 January 2021 (aged 83)
- Position: Defender

Senior career*
Years	Team	Apps	(Gls)
- FC Admira Wacker

International career
1963	Austria	2	(0)
- * Club domestic league appearances and goals

Ferdinand Kolarik (4 October 1937 – 6 January 2021) was an Austrian footballer who played as a defender for FC Admira Wacker. He made two appearances for the Austria national team in 1963.
