= Günter Oberhuber =

Austrian ice hockey player

Personal information
- Nationality: Austrian
- Born: 22 April 1954; Innsbruck, Austria
- Died: 28 November 2021 (aged 67)

Sport
- Sport: Ice hockey

Günter Oberhuber (22 April 1954 – 28 November 2021) was an Austrian ice hockey player. He competed in the men's tournament at the 1976 Winter Olympics.
