= Roger Lenaers =

Jesuit pastor (1925–2021)

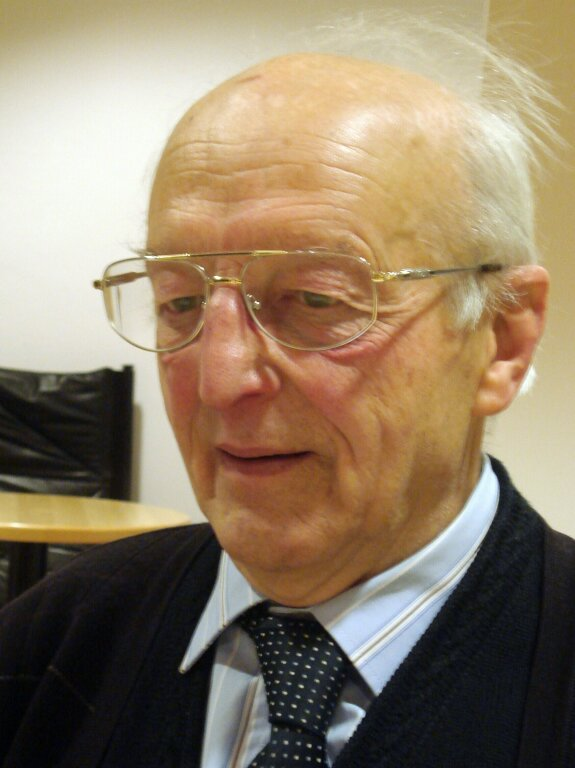
Lenaers in 2009

Roger Charles Lenaers (4 January 1925 – 5 August 2021) was a Jesuit pastor in the diocese of Innsbruck. He entered the Society of Jesus in 1942 and followed the regular courses at the Jesuit School of Philosophy and Theology and classical languages at a university.

== Academic career ==
As a classicist Lenaers specialized in the didactics of the Old Languages (around 30 publications, each with commentaries for teachers). As theologian he taught religion in schools for secondary education and in schools training future religion mistresses. His special interest went out to questions about faith emerging from modernity and secularization, modernity understood as western ideology or weltanschauung, emerging during the Enlightenment, as consequence of modern sciences and the humanism thriving during the Renaissance.

In 2000 and 2002 he published two rather extensive essays about the clash between modernity and modern religious convictions. By reinterpreting the essence he tried to reconcile the theological message with modernity. The two books got a positive critical review in the specialized media, in Flanders. In 2005 the two essays were published in a single book, first in German, then in English (2006). Spanish and Portuguese translations followed. An Italian translation is ready for the press. In 2008 the linguistically corrected second German edition followed and in April 2009 a second book will be published with the provocative title "Even without a God-in-the-highest".

Since 1995 Lenaers was parish priest in Vorder- and Hinterhornbach (Lechtal, Tyrol, Austria).

== Publications ==
- De Droom van Nebukadnezar. Of het einde van een middeleeuwse kerk. 160 blz., Berg en Dal/Leuven, 2000
- Uittocht uit oudchristelijke mythen. Berg en Dal/Leuven, 2002
- Der Traum des Königs Nebukadnezar. Das Ende einer mittelalterlichen Kirche. copy-us Verlags GmbH, Kleve 2005, ISBN 3-935861-15-X.
  English translation: Nebuchadnezzar's Dream or the End of a Medieval Catholic Church, Gorgias Press, Piscataway, NJ, U.S.A. 2007. Spanish: Otro Cristianismo es posible, Fe en lenguaje de modernidad, Editorial Abya Yala, Quito, 2008, 244 S. Portuguese: Outro Cristianismo é Possível. Paulus Editora, São Paulo. Italian: Il sogno di Nabucodonosor. Fine della chiesa cattolica medievale.
- Der Traum des Königs Nebukadnezar. Das Ende einer mittelalterlichen Kirche. Vortrag, 12 Seiten in German. Wien 2008
- Das Papsttum als Stein des Anstoßes – was können wir tun? Vortrag, 18 Seiten in German Linz 2009
