= Penzing =

Coordinates: 48°13′00″N 16°14′55″E

Penzing Penzing (Bavarian)
- 14th District of Vienna
- Coat of arms

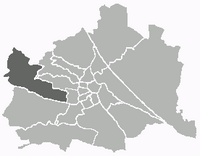
- Location of the district within Vienna
- Country: Austria
- City: Vienna

Government
  - District Director: Michaela Schüchner (SPÖ)
  - First Deputy: Ewald Lochner, MA (SPÖ)
  - Second Deputy: Mag. Natascha Fussenegger (ÖVP)
  - Representation (54 Members): SPÖ 22, Greens 12, FPÖ 11, ÖVP 7, NEOS 6, KPÖ 2

Area
  - Total: 33.96 km^{2} (13.11 sq mi)

Population (2016-01-01)
  - Total: 91,578
  - Density: 2,697/km^{2} (6,984/sq mi)
- Postal code: 1140
- Address of District Office: Hietzinger Kai 1; 1140 Wien
- Website: www.wien.gv.at/penzing/

Penzing (German pronunciation: [ˈpɛntsɪŋ]) is the 14th district of Vienna in Austria. It consists of the localities of Penzing, Breitensee, Baumgarten, Hütteldorf and Hadersdorf-Weidlingau. In the west, it shares a border with Purkersdorf and Mauerbach. A large portion of the district is made up of greenery, including the Steinhof park, the Dehnepark and a portion of the Wienerwald. It is served by the eponymous Wien Penzing railway station, as well as Breitensee, Hütteldorf, Wolf in der Au, Hadersdorf, and Weidlingau stations.

== Geography ==
Penzing is located in the West of Vienna with an area of 33,96 km², making it the fourth largest district of Vienna (8.2% of the city's total area). Penzing is separated from Hietzing by the river Wien. The Vienna Woods are located in the northwest, which extend into the province of Upper Austria. It is neighboured by Hernals and Ottakring to the north and Rudolfsheim-Fünfhaus to the east. After Hietzing, Penzing is the second most forested district in Vienna, with 47.4% of its area forested. The highest point is Schutzengel Mountain (508m).

== Geology ==
Penzing lies between the Alps and the Vienna Basin, with its geology largely being congruous with that of the two zones. The area is characterised by its forests and sandstone, as well as its flat hills without large peaks. The only deep valleys in the region largely consist of streams. The region is also close to the Helvetic nappes as well as the Vienna basin, which is generally not accentuated except for the valley itself.

== History ==
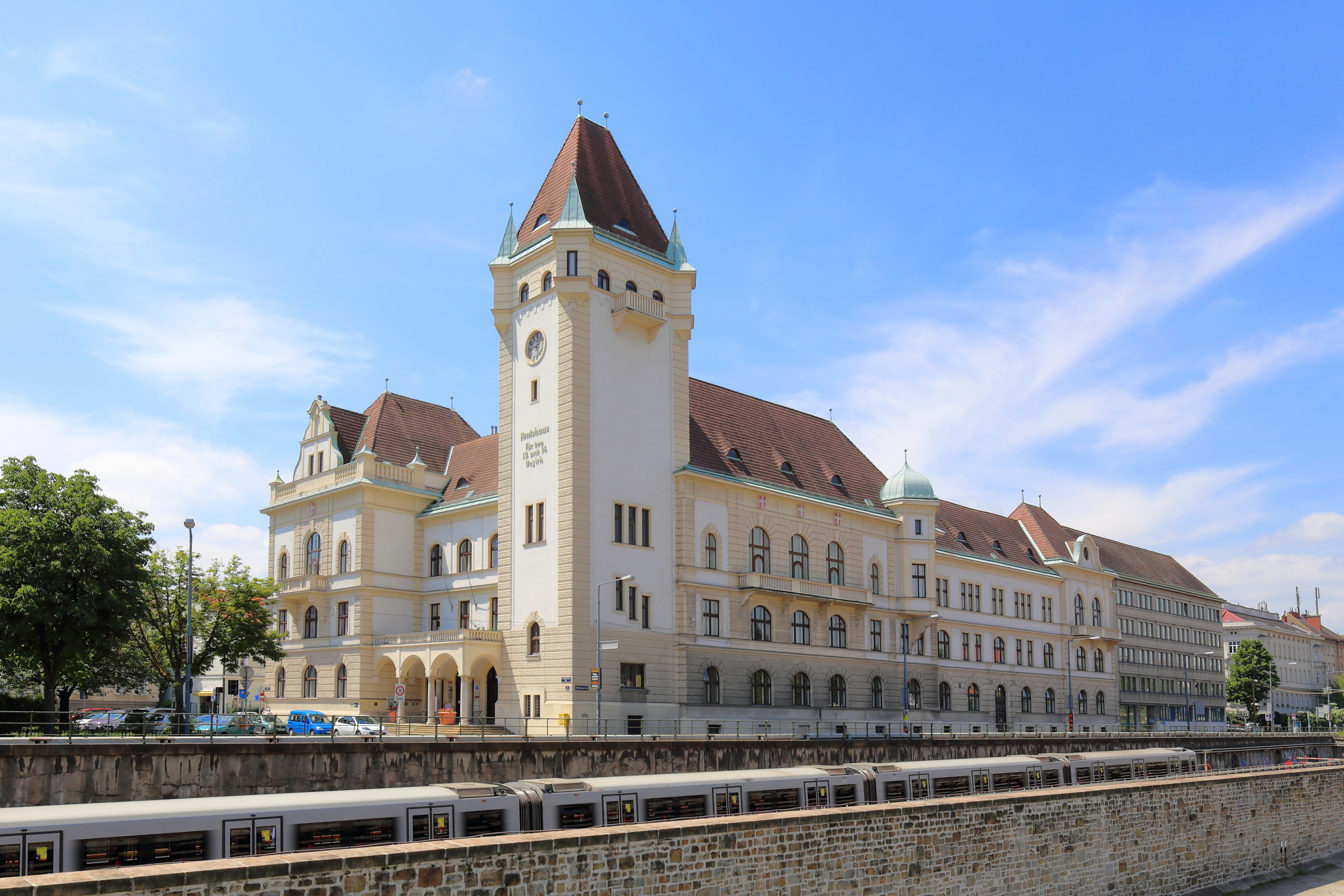
The Office Building for the 13th and 14th Districts, the administrative organ of Penzing until 2016.

In 1892, the area under Penzing's jurisdiction (other than Hadersdorf-Weidlingau) was transferred from Upper Austria to the city of Vienna. At the time, it was the 13th district of Vienna, combined with the modern district of Hietzing. Under the Nazi regime, it was split into its own district on the 15th of October 1938. Everything north of the River Wien became part of Hietzing, with the rest (as well as the newly-incorporated Hadersdorf-Weidlingau) being incorporated into the 14th district of Penzing. The territory of Purkersdorf was also made part of this 14th district, although it once again became part of Lower Austria in 1954. Since 1954, the borders of Penzing have largely remained unchanged.

As the 13th and 14th districts of Vienna were historically united, magistrates for both districts worked at the Office Building for the 13th and 14th Districts, which is located in Hietzing. The management and administration of the district took place in the building, but in 2016 they moved into Penzing proper, and resettled to their new address at 14 Hütteldorfer Straße 188.

In 1992, the Auer-Welsbach-Park transferred from the district of Penzing to the district of Rudolfsheim-Fünfhaus. In 1995, some other minor border changes took place, with Josef-Weinheber-Platz, Steinbruchstraße, Kendlerstraße, Sporckplatz and Ibsenstraße being divided between Rudolfsheim-Fünfhaus and Ottakring. This land mostly consisted of private plots, although notably it led to the local fire station becoming part of the Ottakring district.

== Population ==
=== Population Growth ===
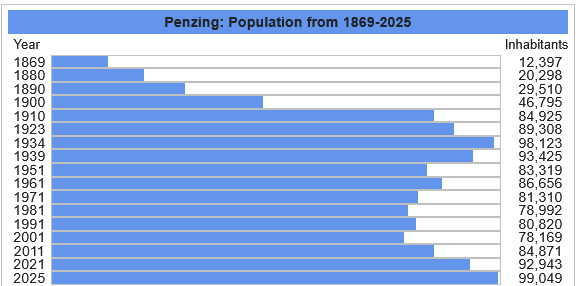

In 1869, only 12,397 people were recorded living in Penzing. Due to increasing immigration into Vienna and the expansion of the city limits, the population of Penzing doubled by 1892. Population growth remained steady, and by 1934, 98,123 people lived in the district. However, by the 70s, the population began to decrease to 80,000, and by 2001 the population was recorded at 78,619. The trend of decreasing population reversed in the 21st century, and by 2025, the population reached a record-breaking 99,049 inhabitants.

=== Age Breakdown ===
The age demographics of Penzing do not differ much from the rest of Vienna. Only 14% of the district are children under 15, (compared to 14.7% in Vienna generally.) 62.5% of the population are between 15-59 (Vienna: 63.6%). In 2001, 23.5% of the population were over 60 (Vienna: 21.7%). The population is split 46.3% male and 53.7% female. On average, more Penzingers are married (41.9%) than in the rest of Vienna (41.2%).

== Sights ==
- Fuchs Mansion: Mansion and studio of the painter Ernst Fuchs
- Otto-Wagner-Hospital: Hospital building erected from 1904 to 1907 as Niederösterreichische Landes-Heil- und Pflegeanstalt für Nerven- und Geisteskranke 'Am Steinhof' ("Lower Austrian State Healing and Care Institution for Nervous and Mental Patients Am Steinhof"). The famous Jugendstil architect Otto Wagner participated in the planning. The complex includes the Kirche am Steinhof, the Jugendstiltheater and a memorial site for Nazi crimes in medicine.
- Fuhrmannhaus: oldest still existing building in the west of Vienna with a baroque fresco hall
- Weststadion: Home of SK Rapid Vienna
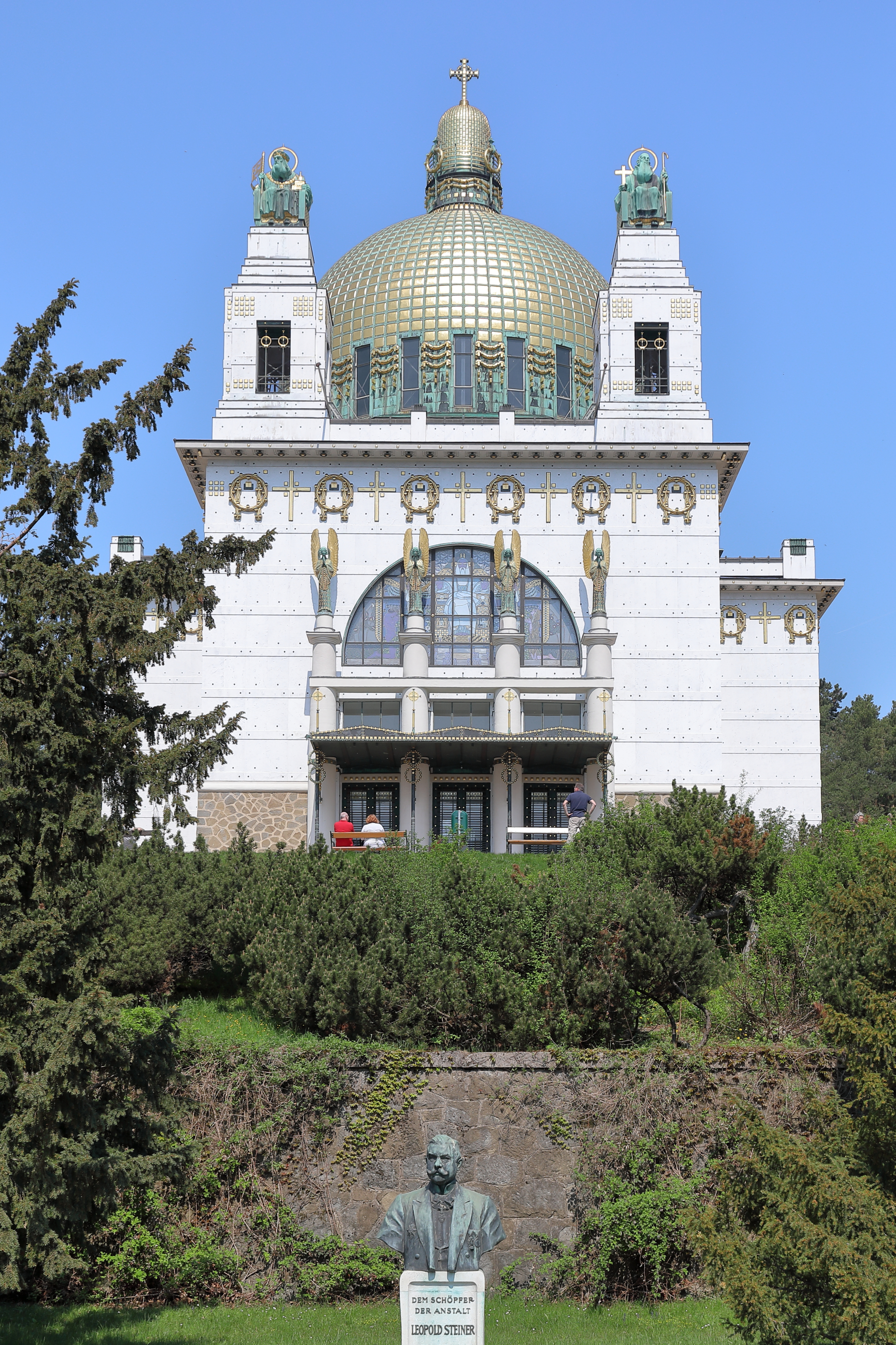
Kirche am Steinhof

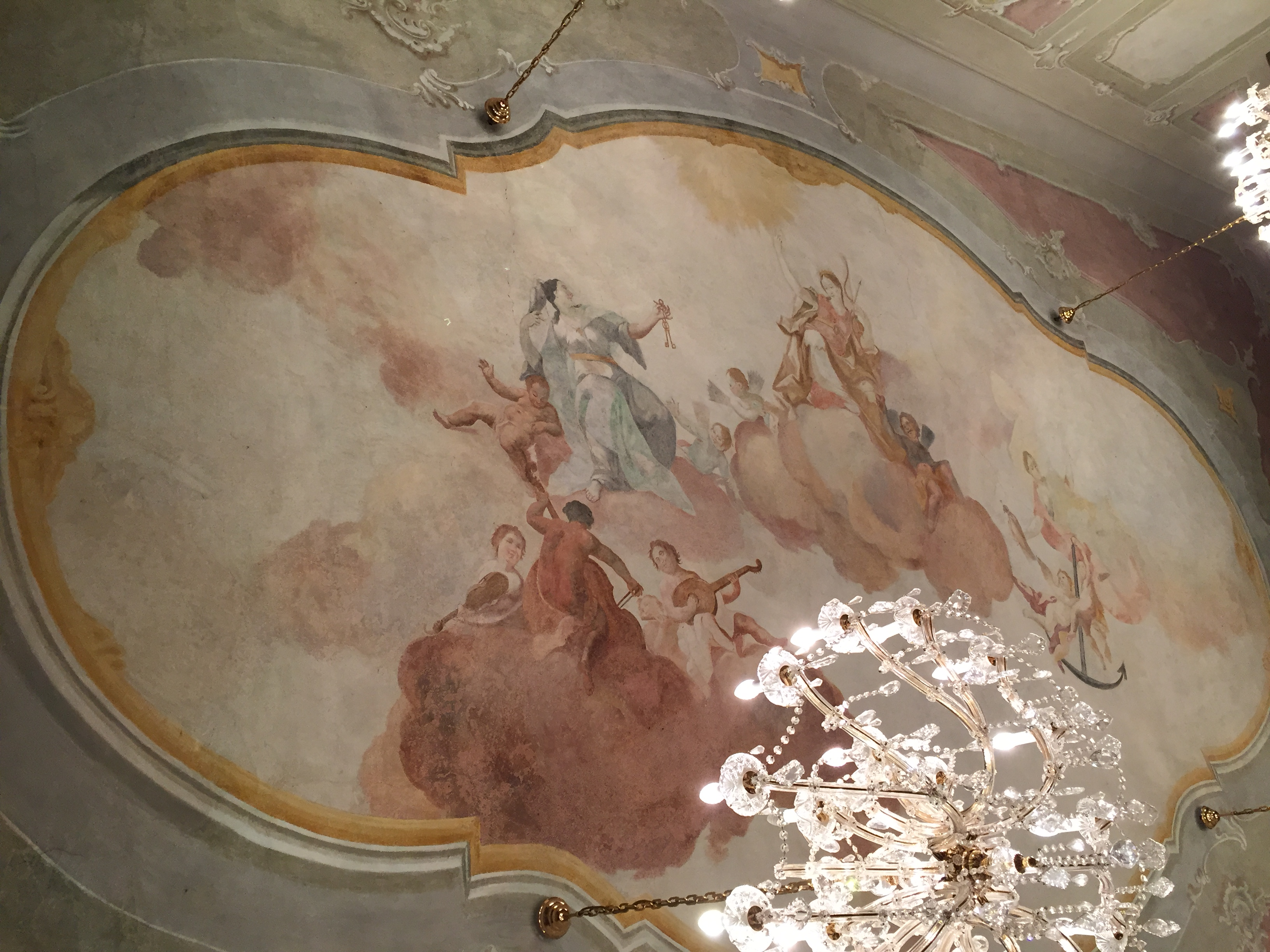
Fuhrmannhaus, ceiling fresco

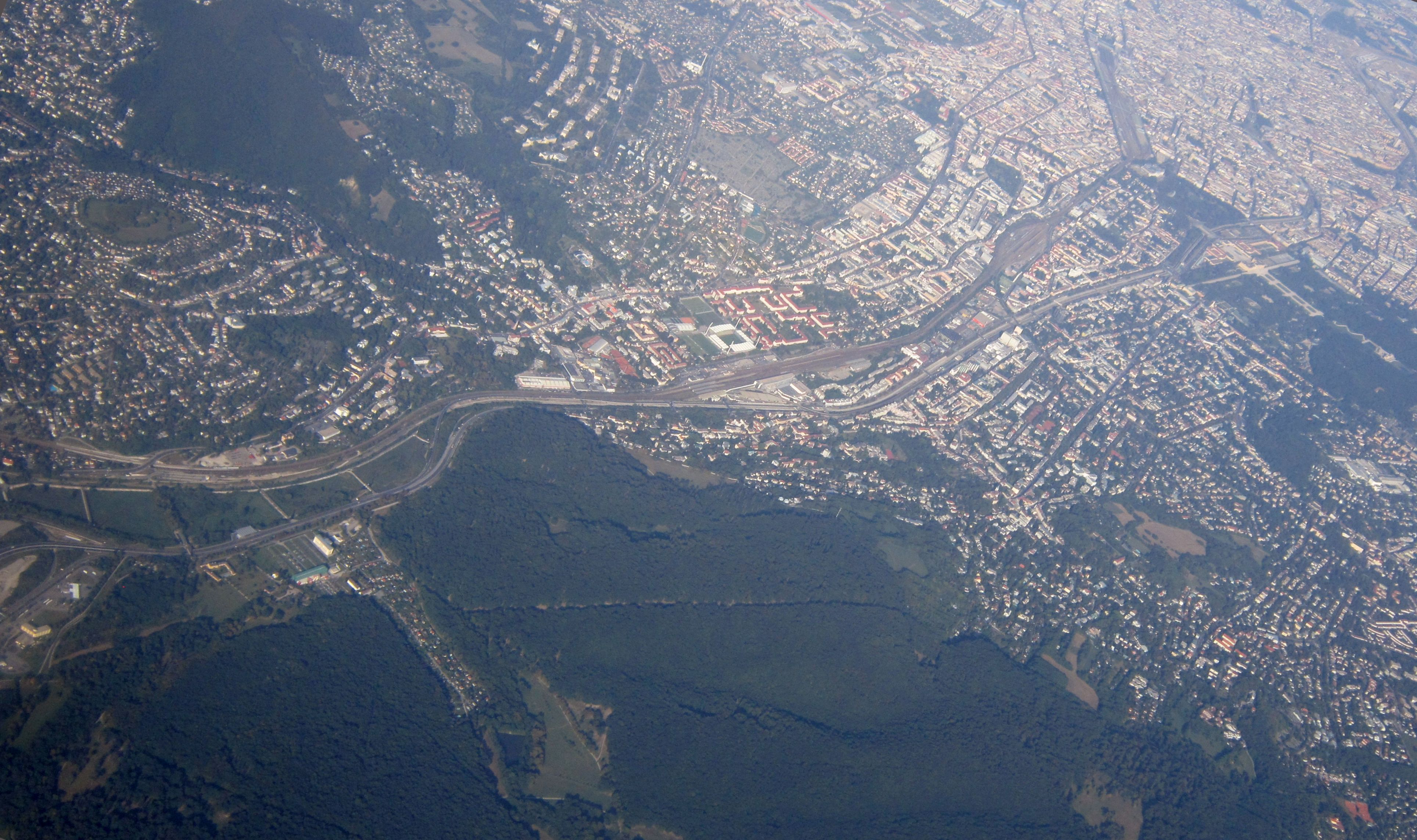
Aerial view of Penzing with Otto-Wagner-Spital near the top of the photo (three rows of big buildings), square-shaped Gerhard Hanappi Stadium downwards from it, and Baumgarten between them, with its sizable Baumgartner Cemetery.

== People ==
- Otto Wagner (1841–1918)
- Count Franz Conrad von Hötzendorf (1852–1925)
- Ernest Augustus, Duke of Brunswick (1887–1953)
- Jörg Lanz von Liebenfels (1874–1954)
- Lotte Lenya (1898–1981)

== Twin town ==
- Zugló, Hungary, since 2022
