= Renate Mann =

Austrian politician (1953–2021)

Member of the Landtag of Upper Austria
- In office 8 May 2008 – 22 October 2009

Member of the Municipal Council of Braunau am Inn
- In office 1997 – 16 November 2021

Personal details
- Born: 20 May 1953 Braunau am Inn, Austria
- Died: 16 November 2021 (aged 68)
- Party: SPÖ

Renate Mann (20 May 1953 – 16 November 2021) was an Austrian politician.

== Career ==
A member of the Social Democratic Party of Austria, she served in the Landtag of Upper Austria from 2008 to 2009 and was on the municipal council of Braunau am Inn from 1997 to 2021.

She became a member of the Landtag following the death of Josef Öller. As a municipal councillor, she advocated for the construction of a women's shelter.
