= Karin Praxmarer =

Austrian politician (1944–2021)

Member of the National Council of Austria
- In office 6 May 1999 – 28 October 1999
- In office 17 December 1986 – 14 January 1996

Personal details
- Born: Kusatz; 9 July 1944 Zwettl, Alpine and Danube Reichsgaue
- Died: 10 December 2021 (aged 77)
- Party: FPÖ

Karin Praxmarer (née Kusatz; 9 July 1944 – 10 December 2021) was an Austrian politician. A member of the Freedom Party of Austria, she served in the National Council from 1986 to 1996 and again in 1999.
