= Viennese Association of Academics =

The Viennese Association of Academics (German: Wiener Akademikerbund) is an Austrian right-wing conservative think tank founded in 1954, which claims to defend neoliberalism and Christian values. It has been described as one of the major proponents of anti-Muslim sentiment in Austria and the counter-jihad movement.

== History ==
The organistation was founded in 1954 by Austrian Minister of Finance Reinhard Kamitz. It was formerly associated with the Austrian People’s Party, until it was banned from the party in 2011 after it questioned the 1947 Prohibition Act.

== Activities ==
The organisation claims to champion freedom of speech and fight against political correctness. It also regularly participates in the annual "March for the Family" demonstration against LGBT rights and queer feminist demands.

The organisation presented a "Vienna Integration Manifesto" in 2011 together with some liberal Muslims, in which it demanded, among other proposals, for Muslim immigrants in Austria to profess themselves as cultural Christians.

In 2013, the organisation was behind the establishment of the Identitäre Bewegung Österreich.
