= Bert Fragner =

Austrian Iranologist (1941–2021)

- Born: November 27, 1941
- Died: December 16, 2021 (aged 80)
- Occupations: Vienna, Austria
- Known for: Iranologist

Bert G. Fragner (27 November 1941 – 16 December 2021) was an Austrian Iranologist.

== Career ==
He was director of the Institute of Iranian Studies of the Austrian Academy of Sciences from 2003 to 2010. Before Fragner taught Iranology at the University of Bamberg from 1984 – 2003. He made several research trips to Central Asia.

On 16 July 2010, Fragner was awarded the Dr. Mahmoud Afshar Prize at the Academy of Sciences in Vienna, for helping to promote Persian and Iranian culture and history.

Fragner died on 16 December 2021, at the age of 80.

== Bibliography (selected) ==
- 1979: Persische Memoirenliteratur als Quelle zur neueren Geschichte Irans (Freiburger Islamstudien) (German). Steiner. ISBN 3515027319
- 1994: From the Caucasus to the Roof of the World: a culinary adventure. London. ISBN 1850437424
- 1999: Die Persophonie. Regionalität, Identität und Sprachkontakt in der Geschichte Asiens (German). Traugott Bautz. ISBN 978-3959480284

== Bibliography ==
- Fragner, Bert G. (1999). Die Persophonie: Regionalität, Identität und Sprachkontakt in der Geschichte Asiens. Berlin: Das Arabische Buch. ISBN 3860932292.
- Fragner, Bert G. (2000). "From the Caucasus to the Roof of the World: a culinary adventure". In Sami Zubaida and Richard Tapper: A Taste of Thyme: Culinary Cultures of the Middle East (2nd ed.). London & New York: Tauris Parke Paperbacks. ISBN 1-86064-603-4.
