= Gunter Hadwiger =

Austrian politician (1949–2021)

Member of the Landtag of Styria
- In office 2010–2015

Personal details
- Born: 28 March 1949 Villach, Allied-occupied Austria
- Died: 9 December 2021 (aged 72)
- Party: FPÖ

Gunter Hadwiger (28 March 1949 – 9 December 2021) was an Austrian politician. A member of the Freedom Party of Austria, he served in the Landtag of Styria from 2010 to 2015.
