= Traude Dierdorf =

Austrian politician (1947–2021)

Traude Dierdorf (Austria, 17 November 1947 – Austria, 1 January 2021) was an Austrian politician.

== Biography ==
Traude Dierdorf was involved in the youth union of the SPÖ and became a staff representative in the town hall in Wiener Neustadt. In 1980 she was elected to the local council for the first time, was a city councilor and was promoted to vice mayor in 1993. In 1997 she was elected first mayor of Wiener Neustadt and remained so until 2005, when she resigned for health reasons.

Dierdorf died on 1 January 2021, at the age of 73.
