= Klaus Emmerich (journalist) =

Austrian journalist (1928–2021)

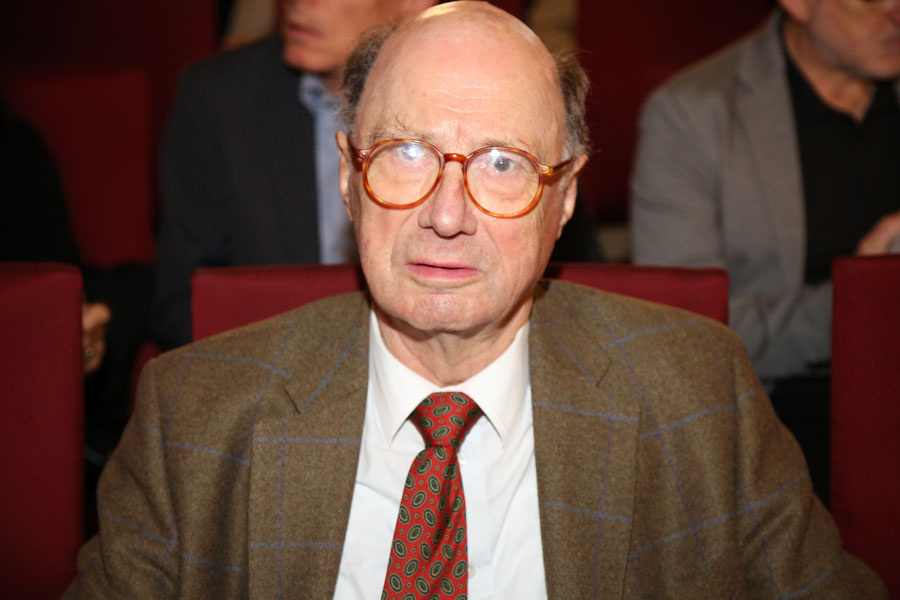
Klaus Emmerich (journalist)

Klaus Emmerich (Frankfurt, 3 June 1928 – 25 February 2021) was an Austrian journalist and the former editor-in-chief of ORF News. He achieved notoriety in the United States for his racist remarks following Barack Obama's win of the 2008 U.S. presidential election. David F. Girard-diCarlo, U.S. ambassador to Austria, officially protested against Emmerich’s remarks on November 14, 2008.

Emmerich died from COVID-19 in Vienna, on 25 February 2021, at age 92, during the COVID-19 pandemic in Austria.

== Quotes ==
"I don't want to be steered by a black man in the Western world. If you say that that is a racist remark: right, without doubt."

"[I]t is a most unsettling development as the blacks are not as advanced in their political & social development."
