= 2021 in the United Kingdom =

Events from the year 2021 in the United Kingdom. For a second year running, the COVID-19 pandemic largely dominated events in the UK, as in most of the world.

== Incumbents ==
- Monarch – Elizabeth II
- Prime Minister – Boris Johnson (Conservative)

== Events ==
=== January ===
- 2 January – COVID-19 in the UK: A record high daily positive test figure is reported at 57,725, as the new strain of the virus continues to spread.
- 4 January
  - COVID-19 in the UK:
    - In a televised address, Boris Johnson announces a new, third COVID-19 lockdown for England, with people ordered to stay at home, and all schools and colleges to switch to remote learning from 5 January. This is expected to last until at least mid-February.
    - A new record high daily positive test figure is reported at 58,784.
    - The UK's second vaccine against COVID-19, developed by Oxford–AstraZeneca, begins to be rolled out.
    - Most of England's primary schools reopen after the Christmas break, amid concerns over whether pupils should be returning during the current level of COVID infections. Most schools close again the following day.
    - The Joint Biosecurity Centre recommends that the COVID-19 alert level is moved from 4 to 5, indicating a "material risk of healthcare services being overwhelmed".
    - Nicola Sturgeon announces tougher restrictions for mainland Scotland to contain the new strain of the virus, implementing a stay-at-home order from midnight and delaying the return to school for pupils until February.
  - The extradition of WikiLeaks founder Julian Assange from the UK to the US is blocked by a court in London, due to concerns over his mental health.
- 5 January – COVID-19 in the UK: The number of new daily confirmed cases of COVID-19 in the UK surpasses 60,000 for the first time since the pandemic began, at 60,916.
- 6 January
  - COVID-19 in the UK:
    - Education Secretary Gavin Williamson announces that GCSE and A-Level exams in England this summer will be replaced by teacher assessments, telling MPs he would "trust in teachers rather than algorithms".
    - Another record daily case figure is reported, with 62,322 new infections. The daily number of deaths from the virus exceeds 1,000 for the first time since April 2020.
- 7 January – COVID-19 in the UK: Two anti-inflammatory medications, tocilizumab and sarilumab, are found to cut deaths by a quarter in patients who are sickest with COVID-19.
- 8 January
  - COVID-19 in the UK:
    - A third vaccine is approved for public use, made by US company Moderna and offering 94% protection from the virus.
    - A major incident is declared in London by mayor Sadiq Khan, stating that the spread of the virus is "out of control" in the capital.
    - The highest number of daily deaths since the pandemic began is recorded at 1,325. A new record high daily positive test figure is reported at 68,053.
- 9 January – COVID-19 in the UK: Buckingham Palace say that the Queen and Prince Philip have both received the first doses of their COVID-19 vaccinations at Windsor Castle.
- 10 January
  - COVID-19 in the UK:
    - Professor Peter Horby, chair of the government's New and Emerging Respiratory Virus Threats Advisory Group says on The Andrew Marr Show "we are now in the eye of the storm" and "it was bad in March, it's much worse now."
    - Health Secretary Matt Hancock tells the BBC that everybody in the top four most vulnerable groups will be offered a vaccine by 15 February, while every adult in the UK will be offered one by the autumn.
- 11 January – Khairi Saadallah is sentenced to life imprisonment for the murder of three men and the attempted murder of three others during a stabbing in Forbury Gardens in Reading in June 2020.
- 13 January – COVID-19 in the UK: The highest daily death toll since the pandemic began is recorded, at 1,564.
- 14 January – COVID-19 in the UK: The government bans travel from South America and Portugal over concerns of a new Brazilian variant of COVID-19.
- 15 January – COVID-19 in the UK: Boris Johnson announces that the UK is to close all travel corridors from 18 January to "protect against the risk of as yet unidentified new strains" of COVID-19, forcing all passengers travelling to the UK to produce a negative test result.
- 18 January – COVID-19 in the UK: Figures compiled by Our World in Data (OWID) show that the seven-day average for this week in the UK is the highest death rate per million population from COVID-19 of any country in the world after an average of 935 daily deaths were recorded, the equivalent of more than 16 people in every million dying each day from the virus.
- 19 January
  - COVID-19 in the UK:
    - Based on testing for antibodies against SARS-CoV-2, the Office for National Statistics (ONS) estimates that 1 in 10 people across the UK had the virus by December 2020 – nearly double the November figure.
    - The highest daily death toll since the pandemic began is recorded, at 1,610.
    - A record daily high of 343,000 people are given a COVID-19 vaccination.
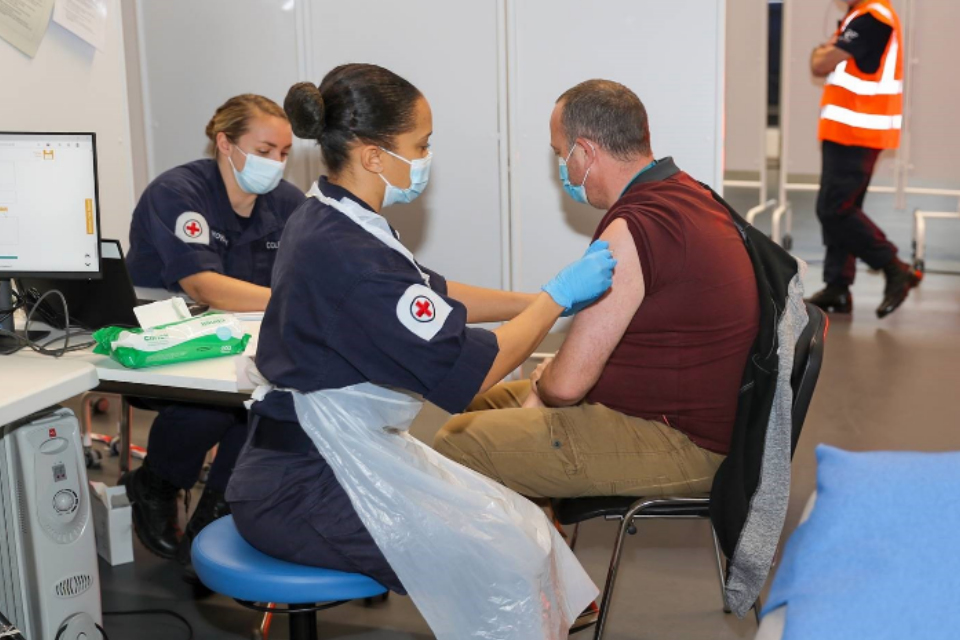
      Royal Navy personnel administering COVID-19 vaccinations in Bristol during early 2021
- 20 January
  - COVID-19 in the UK:
    - The highest daily death toll since the pandemic began is recorded, at 1,820.
    - A record daily high of 363,508 people are given a COVID-19 vaccination, bringing the total number of first doses so far to 4,973,248 and 464,036 second doses.
- 21 January
  - COVID-19 in the UK:
    - Glastonbury Festival is cancelled for the second year running as a result of the pandemic.
    - Arlene Foster announces that the lockdown in Northern Ireland will be extended to at least 5 March, adding that restrictions may have to remain in place until after the Easter holidays in April.
  - Storm Christoph: Five "danger to life" flood warnings are put in place across North West England and Wales after hundreds of homes are evacuated overnight due to widespread flooding caused by heavy rain and snow.
- 22 January
  - COVID-19 in the UK:
    - The R number is reported to have fallen to between 0.8 and 1 for the first time since the beginning of December 2020.
    - The latest analysis of UK data suggests that the new viral strain may be up to 30% deadlier.
  - Four men are jailed for the manslaughter of 39 Vietnamese migrants after they were found dead in a lorry container in Essex in October 2019.
- 25 January – Online retailer Boohoo acquires the Debenhams brand and website for £55m after the department store went into administration in April 2020, but it does not retain any of its stores, putting up to 12,000 jobs at risk.
- 26 January – COVID-19 in the UK: Boris Johnson says he is "deeply sorry for every life that has been lost" as the number of deaths from COVID-19 in the UK exceeds 100,000.
- 27 January
  - COVID-19 in the UK:
    - Boris Johnson confirms that schools in England will not be able to reopen to all pupils after the February half-term as planned, but could do so from 8 March "at the earliest". He adds that he hopes a "gradual and phased" relaxation of COVID-19 restrictions can begin in early March.
    - Home Secretary Priti Patel announces that people travelling from "red list" countries considered to be COVID-19 hotspots will be required to quarantine in government hotels, while anyone wishing to travel abroad will need to prove that they are making an essential trip.
- 28 January – COVID-19 in the UK: A third vaccine, Novavax, which will be manufactured in Stockton-on-Tees, is shown to be 89.3% effective against the virus in a two-dose regimen, following large-scale UK trials. 60 million doses are secured by the government.
- 29 January – COVID-19 in the UK: A fourth vaccine, Ad26.COV2.S, is shown to be 66% effective against the virus in a one-dose regimen. With 30 million doses ordered, Matt Hancock tells reporters that it could "significantly bolster" the UK's vaccine programme if approved by the Medicines and Healthcare products Regulatory Agency (MHRA).
- 30 January – COVID-19 in the UK: A record daily high of 598,389 people are given a coronavirus vaccination, bringing the total so far to 8,977,329.
- 31 January – Flu cases are reported to have fallen by more than 95%, reaching the lowest levels seen in 130 years, believed to be due to the COVID-19 lockdown and new health habits.

=== February ===
- 1 February
  - COVID-19 in the UK:
    - The government orders an extra 40 million doses of VLA2001, a vaccine from French biotech company Valneva SE, for availability later in the year and into 2022.
    - Door-to-door testing is launched, in an attempt to contain the spread of a new South African variant of the virus (later known as the Beta variant), after cases are found in Hertfordshire, Surrey, Kent, Walsall, Sefton and three London boroughs.
  - Online retailer ASOS acquires the Topshop, Topman and Miss Selfridge brands for £330m, but does not retain any of the brands' 70 stores, putting 2,500 jobs at risk.
- 2 February
  - COVID-19 in the UK:
    - Public Health England (PHE) says that the UK variant of COVID-19 has mutated again and that they are investigating "worrying" new changes. Tests show cases of the new strain have a mutation called E484K that is present in the South African variant.
    - A study by the University of Oxford suggests that a single dose of the Oxford–AstraZeneca vaccine could lead to a "substantial" fall in the transmission of COVID-19, and protection is 76% effective during the three months after the first dose is given, rising to 82% after a second dose.
  - Captain Sir Tom Moore, who raised over £32m for NHS Charities Together, dies at the age of 100 after contracting COVID-19.
- 3 February – COVID-19 in the UK: The number of people receiving a vaccine dose in the UK exceeds 10 million.
- 4 February – Three people are killed, including an alleged assailant in a road crash, after an attack at the University Hospital Crosshouse and a related stabbing nearby in Kilmarnock, East Ayrshire, Scotland. Police Scotland say the incidents are thought to be connected but not terror-related.
- 5 February
  - COVID-19 in the UK: Health Secretary Matt Hancock confirms the government's "ambition" to offer all adults over the age of 50 a first COVID-19 vaccination by the end of May.
  - One man is killed and ten people are injured after five stabbing incidents take place in the space of two hours in the London Borough of Croydon. Metropolitan Police describe the stabbings as "needless and abhorrent" and say extra police officers will be deployed across south London.
- 7 February
  - COVID-19 in the UK:
    - A not yet peer-reviewed study by the University of Oxford suggests the Oxford–AstraZeneca vaccine offers minimal protection against mild disease from the South African variant of the virus but does protect against severe disease. Oxford lead vaccine developer, Professor Sarah Gilbert, says a modified version of the vaccine capable of tackling the South African variant should be ready by the autumn, and that "efforts are underway to develop a new generation of vaccines that will allow protection to be redirected to emerging variants as booster jabs".
    - The number of people receiving a vaccine dose in the UK exceeds 12 million.
- 8–10 February – Snow and ice causes travel disruption across much of the country. A temperature of −17.1 °C is recorded in Altnaharra, Scotland, the lowest reading in the UK since December 2010.
- 9 February
  - COVID-19 in the UK: The government announces tough new measures for travellers. UK and Irish residents returning from 33 red list countries will be charged £1,750 to quarantine in a government-sanctioned hotel for 10 days, with fines of up to £10,000 for those who fail to do so. A prison sentence of up to 10 years is to be introduced for those who lie on their passenger locator forms about visiting a red list country.
  - Cumbria County Council suspends plans for Woodhouse Colliery, the UK's first deep coal mine since 1987, following strong criticism over its environmental damage and carbon emissions.
- 10 February – David Wilson is sentenced to 25 years imprisonment for 96 sex offences against 51 boys, which he committed between May 2016 and April 2020.
- 11 February
  - COVID-19 in the UK:
    - A study finds that the arthritis drug tocilizumab can reduce deaths from COVID-19, enough to save the lives of one in 25 patients admitted to hospital, and can reduce the need for a mechanical ventilator.
    - The number of people receiving a vaccine dose in the UK exceeds 14 million.
  - The Met Office reports an overnight temperature of −22.9 °C in Braemar, Aberdeenshire, the coldest weather in the UK since 1995.
- 12 February
  - COVID-19 in the UK:
    - The UK's R rate falls to between 0.7 and 0.9, its lowest level since July 2020.
    - The number of people who have been infected by the virus since the start of the pandemic exceeds four million.
  - The ONS reports that the UK economy shrank by 9.9% during 2020, its largest annual contraction since the Great Frost of 1709.
  - The Supreme Court rules that oil-polluted Nigerian communities can sue Shell in English courts.
- 14 February – COVID-19 in the UK: The number of people receiving a vaccine dose in the UK exceeds 15 million.
- 15 February – COVID-19 in the UK: Boris Johnson hails the vaccine rollout as an "unprecedented national achievement" and urges the public to remain "optimistic but patient" over the relaxation of restrictions, adding that an approach to exiting lockdown should be "cautious but irreversible".
- 18 February – COVID-19 in the UK: Figures from Imperial College London's React study suggests that COVID-19 infections have dropped by two-thirds across England since lockdown began in January, with an 80% fall in London.
- 19 February
  - The Duke and Duchess of Sussex confirm they will not return as working members of the Royal Family.
  - The Supreme Court rules that Uber drivers must be treated as workers, rather than self-employed, and should therefore be entitled to minimum wage and holiday pay.
  - The High Court rules that Matt Hancock "acted unlawfully by failing to comply with the Transparency Policy" and "breached his legal obligation to publish Contract Award Notices within 30 days" when awarding contracts during the COVID-19 pandemic. Hancock explained the delay in publishing the contracts as being on average "just after a fortnight late", and reasoned it was "because my team were working seven days a week, often 18 hours a day, to get hold of the equipment that was saving lives".
  - COVID-19 in the UK: Boris Johnson pledges to donate most of the UK's surplus vaccine supply to poorer countries.
- 20 February – COVID-19 in the UK: As the number of people receiving their first vaccine dose exceeds 17 million, Boris Johnson announces he wants the programme to "go further and faster" by offering every adult in the UK their first jab by 31 July.
- 22 February – COVID-19 in the UK: Boris Johnson unveils a four-step plan for ending lockdown restrictions in England by 21 June. Subject to four tests on vaccines, hospitalisations and deaths, infection rates and new variants being met – the plan's first step will see the reopening of schools and colleges from 8 March.
- 24 February – COVID-19 in the UK: Nicola Sturgeon unveils the Scottish Government's "cautious" approach to ending lockdown restrictions in Scotland, which includes a phased return for primary and secondary school pupils from 15 March.
- 25 February – COVID-19 in the UK: The Joint Biosecurity Centre advises that the COVID-19 alert level is downgraded from 5 to 4, indicating that the threat of the NHS being overwhelmed is receding.
- 26 February – Begum v Home Secretary: The Supreme Court unanimously rules that Shamima Begum, who left the UK for Syria to join the Islamic State terrorist group and has been stripped of her British citizenship, can lawfully be prevented on security grounds from returning to the UK to appeal her case.
- 28 February
  - COVID-19 in the UK:
    - Six cases of the Brazilian variant of COVID-19 (later known as the Gamma variant) are detected in the UK – three in England and three in Scotland.
    - The number of people receiving a vaccine dose in the UK exceeds 20 million.
  - Winchcombe meteorite: Fragments of a rare carbonaceous chondrite meteorite, the first known in the UK, fall at Winchcombe in the Cotswolds.

=== March ===
- 1 March – COVID-19 in the UK: Data published by Public Health England (PHE) indicates that a single dose of either the Oxford–AstraZeneca vaccine or Pfizer–BioNTech vaccine reduces the need for hospitalisation in older adults by more than 80%.
- 2 March – COVID-19 in the UK: Arlene Foster and Michelle O'Neill unveil a "cautious and hopeful" plan for ending lockdown restrictions in Northern Ireland, but unlike England and Scotland there is no timetable for lifting measures. Instead, a five-step plan covering nine different sectors is revealed, with progression based on key health criteria being met.
- 3 March
  - Murder of Sarah Everard: a London woman is kidnapped, raped and strangled by a police officer.
  - COVID-19 in the UK:
    - Chancellor of the Exchequer Rishi Sunak delivers his first budget since the pandemic began in which he commits an extra £65bn to "protect the jobs and livelihoods of the British people", including an extension to the Coronavirus Job Retention Scheme until the end of September, but warns that future tax increases are needed to stop "irresponsible" mounting debt as it is confirmed government borrowing is expected to reach a peacetime record of £335bn in 2021.
    - Figures from the Office for Budget Responsibility (OBR) forecast the economy to grow by 4% in 2021 and 7.3% in 2022, bringing it back to its pre-pandemic size by mid-2022.
- 4 March – Amazon launches its first cashierless grocery store in the UK, which uses camera vision and sensors to automate the shopping process.
- 5 March – A proposal to give NHS workers a 1% payrise is described by the government as "what is affordable" given the public finances, while unions and others strongly criticise the amount and call for strike action.
- 7 March
  - COVID-19 in the UK: The daily number of deaths falls below 100 for the first time since October 2020.
  - Prince Harry and Meghan, Duchess of Sussex, appear in a TV interview with Oprah Winfrey in the United States (broadcast the following day on ITV), in which the Duchess reveals her suicidal thoughts, accusations of racism by an unnamed family member, and other concerns about the Royal Family.
- 8 March
  - COVID-19 in the UK:
    - Millions of children return to school in England, after two months of distance education, as the first stage in easing the national lockdown.
    - The daily infection number falls below 5,000 for the first time since September 2020.
  - The National Institute for Health and Care Excellence (NICE) approves a gene therapy, Zolgensma, for babies with severe spinal muscular atrophy. At £1.79m, the drug is reportedly one of the most expensive to ever be granted use by the NHS.
- 9 March
  - Buckingham Palace says the race issues raised by Prince Harry and Meghan, Duchess of Sussex in their recent TV interview are "concerning" and "while some recollections may vary", the matters will be "taken very seriously" and "addressed by the family privately".
  - Piers Morgan quits as presenter of ITV's Good Morning Britain following his remarks about Meghan, Duchess of Sussex, which drew 41,000 complaints to Ofcom. A week later, Ofcom confirm over 57,000 complaints have been made, making it the most complained about programme since the regulator's formation.
- 10 March
  - The government commissions a feasibility study for a bridge or tunnel connection between Scotland and Northern Ireland.
  - Police searching for a missing 33-year-old woman, Sarah Everard, discover human remains in Kent woodland. Wayne Couzens, a serving Met Police officer is arrested on suspicion of her kidnap and murder. Two days later, police confirm the body is that of Ms Everard.
- 13 March – Police are criticised for their heavy-handed approach at a vigil in south London to mourn Sarah Everard, during which four arrests are made.
- 15 March – COVID-19 in the UK: The Medicines and Healthcare products Regulatory Agency (MHRA) says there is no evidence linking the Oxford–AstraZeneca vaccine to blood clots after several European countries pause their use of the vaccine as a precautionary measure.
- 18 March – COVID-19 in the UK: A record daily high of 660,276 people are given a COVID-19 vaccination.
- 19 March – COVID-19 in the UK: A record daily high of 711,157 people are given a COVID-19 vaccination.
- 20 March – COVID-19 in the UK: A new record daily high of 844,285 people are given a COVID-19 vaccination, bringing the total having received at least one dose to 27.6 million. More than half of the adult population in the UK have now had their first dose of vaccine.
- 21 March
  - Demonstrators attack police in Bristol during "Kill the Bill" protests against the Police, Crime, Sentencing and Courts Bill.
  - Census 2021 is conducted in England, Wales, and Northern Ireland. The population of England and Wales is recorded as 59,597,300, a rise of 6.3% over the previous decade.
- 22 March – An independent inquiry finds that Nicola Sturgeon did not mislead Scottish Parliament over her involvement in the Alex Salmond scandal, and she is cleared of breaching the ministerial code.
- 23 March – COVID-19 in the UK: A minute's silence is held across the UK to remember the 126,172 people who have died from the virus since the beginning of lockdown exactly a year ago.
- 25 March
  - COVID-19 in the UK: MPs vote by 484 to 76 to extend emergency COVID-19 powers for another six months.
  - Demonstrations take place outside Batley Grammar School after a cartoon of Muhammad is shown in class during a discussion about press freedom and religious extremism.
- 27 March – COVID-19 in the UK: The death toll from the virus exceeds 150,000.
- 29 March – Tokamak Energy announces first plasma with its newly upgraded prototype fusion reactor, the ST40.
- 30 March
  - The UK experiences its second warmest March day on record, with temperatures of 24.5 °C (76.1 °F) in Kew Gardens, the highest since 1968.
  - COVID-19 in the UK: The ONS reports that half of people in the UK now have antibodies against the virus, either through infection or vaccination.
  - 2021 Northern Ireland riots begin.

=== April ===
- 1 April – Benjamin Hannam becomes the first British police officer to be convicted of a terrorism offence, after being found guilty of joining the banned right-wing extremist group National Action, lying on his Met Police application, and having terror documents detailing knife combat and explosive-making. On 30 April, he is jailed at the Old Bailey for four years and four months.
- 2 April – COVID-19 in the UK: The number of people in the UK having received their second dose of a vaccine exceeds five million.
- 3 April
  - COVID-19 in the UK: The Medicines and Healthcare products Regulatory Agency (MHRA) says the benefits of the Oxford–AstraZeneca vaccine continue to outweigh any risk, after seven deaths from unusual blood clots are confirmed among the 18 million people who received the vaccine in the UK up to 24 March.
  - More than 100 people are arrested in central London during a protest against the Police, Crime, Sentencing and Courts Bill.
- 6 April – COVID-19 in the UK: A trial of the Oxford–AstraZeneca vaccine on children is halted while the Medicines and Healthcare products Regulatory Agency (MHRA) investigates a possible link with rare blood clots in adults.
- 7 April
  - COVID-19 in the UK:
    - A review by the Medicines and Healthcare products Regulatory Agency (MHRA) finds that of the 20 million people who received the Oxford–AstraZeneca vaccine in the UK up to 31 March 79 people suffered rare blood clots – 19 of whom have died.
    - The Joint Committee on Vaccination and Immunisation (JCVI) advises that under-30s should be offered an alternative jab to the Oxford–AstraZeneca vaccine due to the evidence linking it to rare blood clots.
    - A third vaccine to be approved in the UK, developed by Moderna, begins to be rolled out.
  - Richard Sutton, 9th Baronet is murdered at his home in Dorset.
  - Police confirm that a body found in a pond in Epping Forest is that of 19-year-old student Richard Okorogheye, who went missing on 22 March.
- 9 April – Buckingham Palace announces the death of Prince Philip, Duke of Edinburgh, husband to the Queen, at Windsor Castle, aged 99.
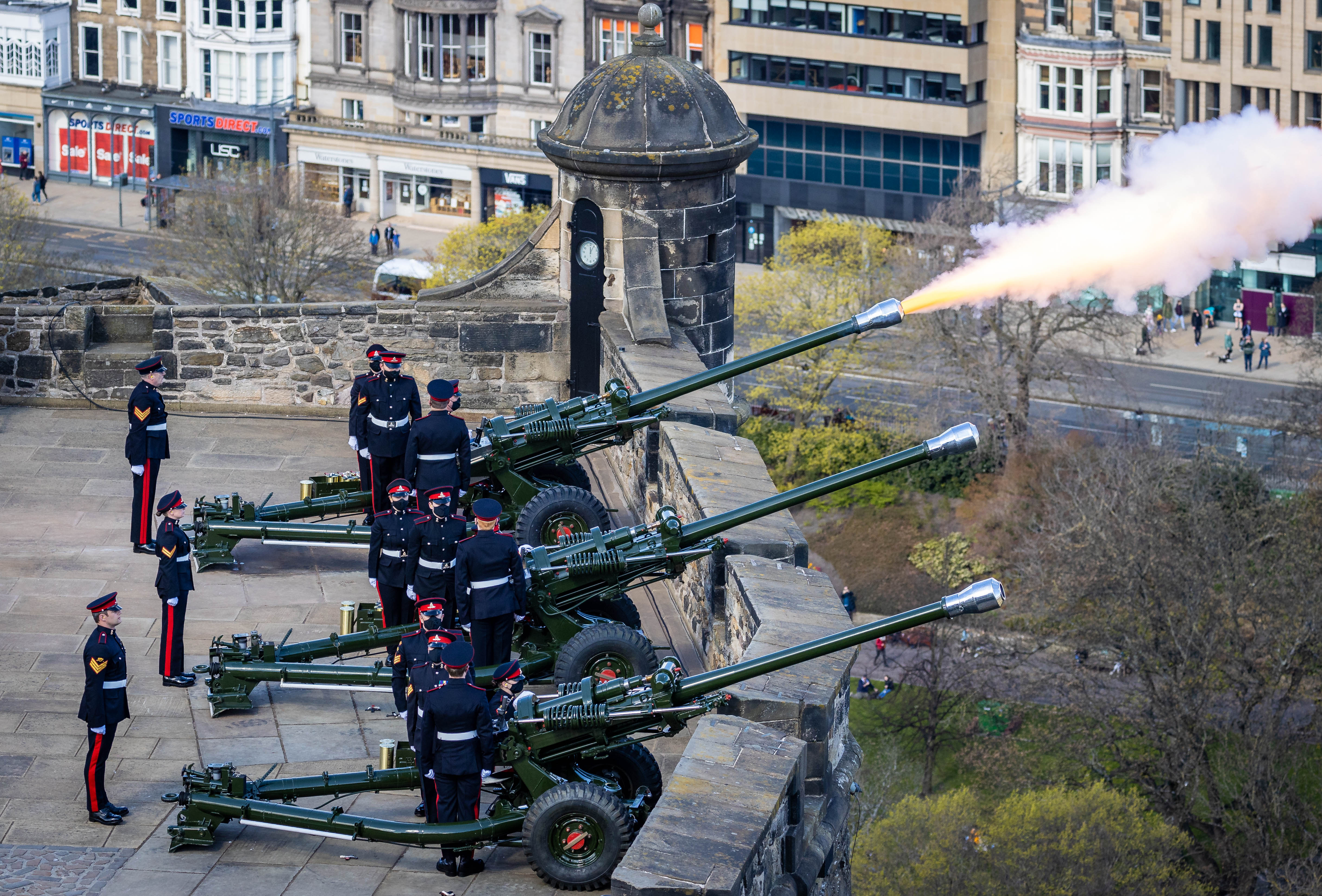
  Gun salute in honour of Prince Philip in Edinburgh on 10 April
- 11 April – COVID-19 in the UK: The daily number of deaths from the virus falls to seven, while daily reported cases fall to 1,730, the lowest figures seen since early September 2020.
- 12 April – COVID-19 in the UK: The next stage of lockdown easing begins with non-essential shops, gyms, hairdressers, and pub gardens opening across England. Rules are also eased in the rest of the UK.
- 13 April
  - COVID-19 in the UK:
    - The next stage of the vaccination programme begins, with over 45s offered a jab.
    - A third vaccine begins to be rolled out, developed by U.S. company Moderna, following the Pfizer–BioNTech and Oxford-AstraZeneca vaccines.
- 15 April
  - The UK's biggest rockfall in 60 years occurs on the Dorset coast, with about 300 metres of cliff weighing an estimated 4,000 tonnes collapsing onto a beach. No deaths or injuries are reported.
  - COVID-19 in the UK: 77 cases of lineage B.1.617, a new Indian strain of the virus, are reported in the UK.
- 17 April – The funeral of Prince Philip takes place at Windsor Castle. COVID-19 restrictions mean there is a limit of 30 guests, with social distancing and mask wearing inside St George's Chapel.
- 18 April – Twelve football clubs, including the "big six" from the Premier League, agree to join a new breakaway European Super League, despite condemnation from UEFA, FIFA and politicians including Boris Johnson.
- 19 April
  - COVID-19 in the UK:
    - The number of people receiving their second dose of a vaccine exceeds 10 million.
    - India is added to the "Red List" of countries from which most travel to the UK is banned, amid concerns over a new viral strain.
- 20 April – Following a backlash, all six English clubs withdraw from the proposed European Super League.
- 23 April
  - Thirty-nine Post Office workers convicted of theft, fraud, and false accounting have their names cleared after one of the UK's most widespread miscarriages of justice.
  - COVID-19 pandemic costs mean government borrowing in the year to March reaches £303.1bn, the highest level since the end of World War II.
  - Former Manchester United player and Wales manager Ryan Giggs is charged with assaulting two women and controlling or coercive behaviour.
- 26 April – COVID-19 in the UK: The vaccine rollout opens to 44-year-olds in England and those aged 35 to 39 in Northern Ireland.
- 27 April – COVID-19 in the UK: The vaccine rollout opens to 42-year-olds and above in England.
- 28 April
  - The European Union approves the EU–UK Trade and Cooperation Agreement, governing the relationship between the EU and UK after Brexit.
  - The Electoral Commission begins an investigation into the funding of Boris Johnson's Downing Street flat, saying there are "reasonable grounds to suspect an offence".
  - COVID-19 in the UK: The government orders an extra 60 million doses of the Pfizer–BioNTech COVID-19 vaccine as it plans for a vaccination booster programme in the autumn.
- 30 April
  - COVID-19 in the UK: The vaccine rollout opens to 40-year-olds and above in England.
  - Actor Noel Clarke has his BAFTA award and membership suspended, following accusations of groping, sexual harassment and bullying from 20 women. Clarke denies the allegations.

=== May ===
- 2 May
  - Foreign Secretary Dominic Raab tells the BBC that Iran's treatment of Nazanin Zaghari-Ratcliffe "amounts to torture", as diplomatic efforts to free the 42-year-old Briton continue.
  - A football match between Manchester United and Liverpool is postponed after hundreds of fans break into the Old Trafford stadium to protest against the Glazer family's ownership of the club.
- 3 May
  - The 2021 World Snooker Championship concludes with Mark Selby defeating Shaun Murphy 18–15 in the final to win his fourth world title.
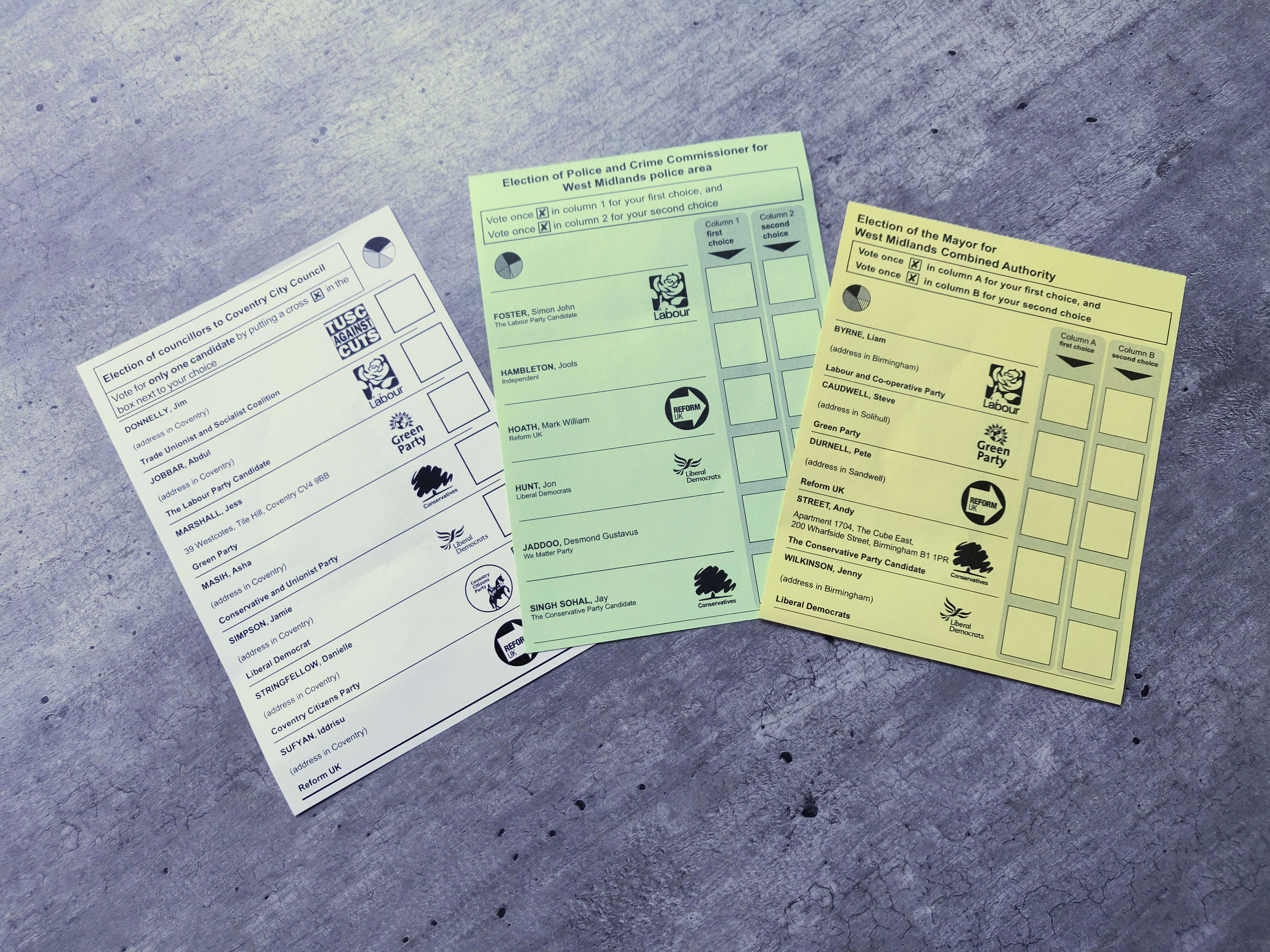
    Ballot papers for 6 May elections. These ballots were for elections open to a voter in Coventry.
- 6 May
  - 2021 United Kingdom local elections: Elections for local councils and directly elected mayors are held in England and police and crime commissioners in England and Wales, including many which were originally due to take place in May 2020 but were postponed due to the COVID-19 pandemic.
  - 2021 Senedd election: Labour keep hold of the Senedd and match the party's best ever result, with 30 out of 60 seats.
  - 2021 Scottish Parliament election: The SNP wins 64 seats out of 129. With the SNP and Scottish Greens both gaining seats, pro-independence parties have an increased majority in the Parliament.
  - 2021 London mayoral election: Sadiq Khan wins a second term, but with a reduced vote share.
  - 2021 Hartlepool by-election: Jill Mortimer becomes the constituency's first Conservative MP since 1974, marking a significant defeat for Labour.
  - The BBC reports that almost all 50 of the UK's biggest employers do not plan to return staff to the office full-time, but will instead favour a new "hybrid" of in-person and remote work.
  - A protest over post-Brexit rights by French fishermen at Saint Helier, Jersey, is brought to an end, following talks to resolve the dispute. Two Royal Navy patrol vessels remain in place around the island.
- 8 May – Angela Rayner is removed from her roles as the Labour Party's chair and national campaign coordinator by Keir Starmer, following the local election results.
- 9 May – Prince Michael of Kent is accused of using his royal status to sell access to Russian President Vladimir Putin's regime, following an investigation by Channel 4 News and The Sunday Times. The Prince denies the allegations.
- 13 May – 2021 Airdrie and Shotts by-election: SNP retain the seat with an increased vote share.
- 14 May – COVID-19 in the UK: Boris Johnson and Chris Whitty provide an update on the 'Indian' variant, warning that its spread in the UK could potentially delay the government's planned easing of lockdown restrictions on 21 June.
- 15 May
  - The final Debenhams store is closed, after more than 240 years in business. The company continues to trade online.
  - Leicester City wins the FA Cup for the first time, defeating Chelsea 1–0 in the final at Wembley. 21,000 supporters watch the game in the stadium, the most at any English professional match since March 2020.
  - COVID-19 in the UK: The number of people having received their second dose of a vaccine exceeds 20 million.
- 17 May – Stage three of the government's conditional lockdown easing goes ahead, enabling larger numbers of people to gather together, including at indoor venues.
- 20 May
  - COVID-19 in the UK: The vaccine rollout opens to those aged 34 and 35 in England.
  - The BBC publishes Lord Dyson's independent investigation into the circumstances around the 1995 Panorama interview with Diana, Princess of Wales. The inquiry finds Martin Bashir guilty of deceit and breaching editorial conduct to obtain the interview.
- 22 May
  - COVID-19 in the UK:
    - The vaccine rollout opens to those aged 32 and 33 in England.
    - The total number of vaccines administered in England exceeds 50 million.
  - The UK scores zero points in the grand final of the Eurovision Song Contest with James Newman's entry "Embers", marking the first time the contest has seen an entry that did not score any points since the new voting system was introduced in 2016.
- 26 May
  - Dominic Cummings, former chief adviser to Boris Johnson, provides evidence to a joint session of the Commons Health, Science and Technology committees. He makes a series of allegations regarding the Government's handling of the pandemic.
  - COVID-19 in the UK:
    - The vaccine rollout opens to those aged 30 and 31 in England.
    - The number of new daily confirmed cases of COVID-19 in the UK is reported as 3,180, the highest figure since 12 April.
- 27 May – A self-driving bus begins trials in Cambridge, the first service of its kind, running autonomously for 24 hours a day.
- 28 May
  - COVID-19 in the UK: A fourth vaccine, and the first requiring only a single jab, is approved for use. Made by US pharmaceutical company Johnson & Johnson, it has an efficacy of 66% in preventing moderate-to-severe COVID-19, 85% efficacy in preventing severe disease, and 100% efficacy against hospitalisation and death.
  - 2019 London Bridge stabbing: A jury rules that failings by MI5 and the police contributed to the deaths of Saskia Jones and Jack Merritt, two young graduates who were unlawfully killed by a convicted terrorist.
- 31 May
  - COVID-19 in the UK: In an interview with BBC Radio 4, Professor Ravi Gupta from the University of Cambridge warns that the UK is entering a third wave of coronavirus infections, fuelled by the Indian variant, and that the ending of lockdown restrictions on 21 June should be postponed.
  - The UK experiences its hottest day of the year so far, with temperatures of almost 25 °C.

=== June ===
- 1 June
  - COVID-19 in the UK: Zero daily deaths from the virus are reported in the UK for the first time since the start of the pandemic in March 2020.
  - Emma Ineson is appointed first Bishop to the Archbishops of Canterbury and York, the office replacing that of Bishop at Lambeth in the Church of England.
- 2 June – COVID-19 in the UK: 75% of the adult population are reported to have received at least one dose of a COVID-19 vaccine.
- 3 June – COVID-19 in the UK: 50% of the adult population are reported to have received their second dose of a COVID-19 vaccine.
- 4 June – COVID-19 in the UK: The Medicines and Healthcare products Regulatory Agency approves the Pfizer-BioNTech vaccine for children aged 12–15.
- 6 June
  - COVID-19 in the UK: Health Secretary Matt Hancock tells Sky News that the new Delta variant from India is 40% more transmissible and that the Government is open to delaying the 21 June ending of lockdown restrictions. However, he also confirms that two vaccine doses work just as effectively against it as previous variants.
  - The four cooling towers at Rugeley B power station in Staffordshire are demolished.
- 7 June – The Parole Board confirms that double child killer Colin Pitchfork is suitable for release after 33 years in prison. A number of MPs announce they will oppose the decision.
- 8 June – COVID-19 in the UK: The vaccine rollout opens to those aged 25 to 29 in England.
- 9 June – The High Court rules that the government acted unlawfully by awarding a £560,000 contract to a company run by friends of Dominic Cummings.
- 10 June
  - Matt Hancock defends the government's handling of the pandemic during four hours of questioning from MPs. He tells them the Delta variant first identified in India now comprises over 90% of new coronavirus cases in the UK.
  - Boris Johnson meets U.S. President Joe Biden in Cornwall, ahead of the G7 Summit.
- 13 June – GB News, a new TV channel aimed at right-leaning viewers, is launched on Freeview, Freesat, Sky, YouView and Virgin Media.
- 14 June
  - COVID-19 in the UK: Johnson confirms a four-week delay to the final easing of coronavirus restrictions in England, due to the rapid increase in Delta variant cases, but says he is "confident" no delay beyond 19 July will be needed.
  - Changes allowing gay and bisexual men to donate blood take effect.
- 15 June – COVID-19 in the UK: The vaccine rollout opens to those aged 23 and 24 in England.
- 16 June – COVID-19 in the UK: The vaccine rollout opens to those aged 21 and 22 in England.
- 17 June
  - Manchester Arena bombing: A public inquiry into the 2017 suicide bombing at Manchester Arena identifies "serious shortcomings" by those in charge of security.
  - Paul Givan and Michelle O'Neill are confirmed as Northern Ireland's first and deputy first ministers.
  - The government announces that General Fusion will build a large-scale nuclear fusion demonstration plant in Oxfordshire, with construction starting in 2022 and operations beginning from 2025.
  - COVID-19 in the UK: The number of daily cases of COVID-19 in the UK surpasses 10,000 for the first time since February.
  - 2021 Chesham and Amersham by-election: Liberal Democrat candidate Sarah Green wins the constituency of Chesham and Amersham with 56.7% of the vote, a swing from the Conservatives of 25.2%. She is the first non-Conservative candidate to win this seat since its formation in 1974.
- 18 June – COVID-19 in the UK: The vaccine rollout opens to those aged 18 to 20 in England.
- 19 June – John Bercow, former Tory MP and Speaker of the House of Commons, defects to Labour, calling his former party "reactionary, populist, nationalistic and sometimes even xenophobic".
- 23 June
  - A new £50 polymer banknote enters circulation. Featuring the face of computer pioneer and codebreaker Alan Turing, it joins the updated and more secure £5, £10 and £20 notes that were introduced in 2016, 2017 and 2020 respectively.
  - PC Benjamin Monk is found guilty of the manslaughter of former Aston Villa striker, Dalian Atkinson, who died after being tasered for six times longer than the legally recommended limit, and then kicked twice in the head. Monk becomes the first police officer since the 1980s to be found guilty over a death in custody in England and Wales.
  - Double murderer Gary Allen is sentenced to life imprisonment with a minimum term of 37 years following a trial at Sheffield Crown Court in which he was convicted of the murders of two women 21 years apart.
- 25 June – Health Secretary Matt Hancock apologises for breaking social distancing rules after pictures of him kissing an aide, Gina Coladangelo, are published in The Sun newspaper.
- 26 June
  - Matt Hancock resigns as health secretary, following the previous day's revelations. Sajid Javid is selected as his successor.
  - A limited-edition £5 coin commemorating the life of Prince Philip, Duke of Edinburgh is unveiled.
  - Three men are charged with murdering 18-year-old Kimani Martin, who was shot while sitting in a taxi.
- 27 June
  - Nine anti-lockdown and climate change protesters are arrested after a day of demonstrations in London.
  - Classified Ministry of Defence documents are found at bus stop in Kent.
- 28 June – Six people are injured in a major fire at Elephant & Castle railway station in south London.
- 29 June
  - Police Constable Benjamin Monk, who unlawfully killed Dalian Atkinson by tasering him to the ground and kicking him in the head is jailed for eight years.
  - A Ford Escort, given to Princess Diana as an engagement present, is sold at auction for more than £52,000.
  - UEFA Euro 2020: England win 2–0 against Germany in the last 16, marking their first victory over Germany in a tournament knockout game since the World Cup final between England and West Germany in 1966.
- 30 June – COVID-19 in the UK: The UK records 26,068 new coronavirus cases, the highest number since 29 January.

=== July ===
- 1 July
  - Prince William and Prince Harry unveil a statue of their mother, Princess Diana at Kensington Palace.
  - Two men are killed in a light aircraft crash near Goodwood Airfield.
  - A 23-year-old man is charged with common assault after a video emerges of England's Chief Medical Officer, Professor Chris Whitty, being accosted by a group of men in a London park.
  - 2021 Batley and Spen by-election: Labour holds the seat of Batley and Spen in West Yorkshire. The new MP is Kim Leadbeater, younger sister of the murdered MP Jo Cox, who had previously held the seat.
- 3 July – UEFA Euro 2020: England beat Ukraine 4–0 in Rome to reach the semi-final of the Euros for the first time in 25 years.
- 5 July
  - COVID-19 in the UK: In a televised address, the prime minister, Boris Johnson says he expects that the final lifting of restrictions in England will proceed from 19 July, but this will be confirmed on 12 July after a review of the latest data.
  - The House of Commons passes the Police, Crime, Sentencing and Courts Bill by 365 votes to 265.
- 7 July – UEFA Euro 2020: England defeat Denmark 2–1 after extra time at Wembley in the semi-final. This marks the first time England have reached the final of a major international tournament since 1966. Almost 24 million people are reported to have watched the match on ITV and ITV+1, with a peak of 25.7 million during the last five minutes.
- 8 July – UEFA Euro 2020: UEFA's Control, Ethics and Disciplinary Body (CEDB) charges England following match incidents the previous night. In one, a laser pointer was allegedly shone in the face of Denmark goalkeeper Kasper Schmeichel as he prepared for a penalty. UEFA also notes a "disturbance" during Denmark's national anthem and fireworks being set off.
- 9 July – Southern Water is fined a record £90m for illegally dumping an estimated 16 to 21 billion tons of raw sewage between 2010 and 2015.
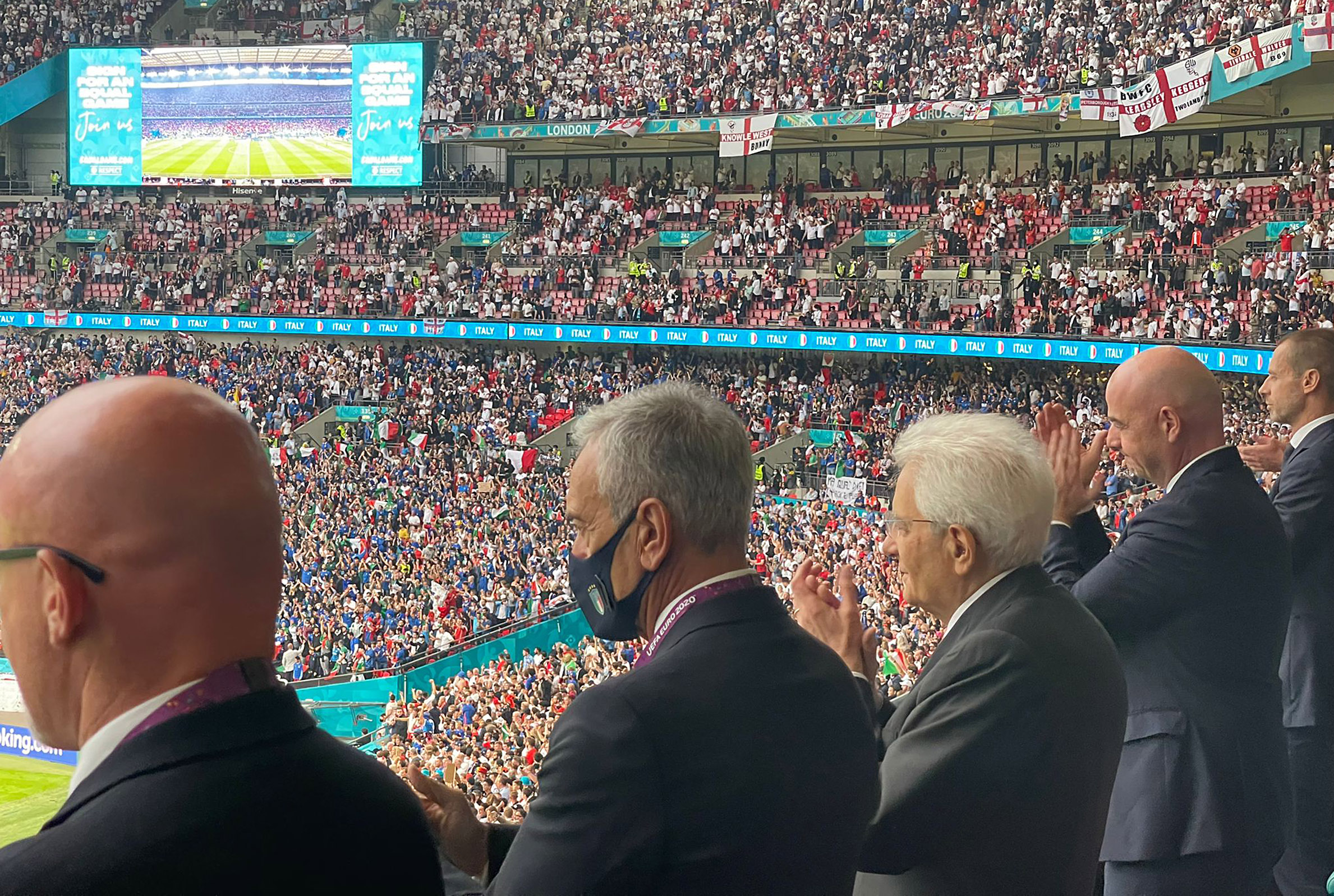
  Supporters at the UEFA Euro 2020 final
- 11 July – UEFA Euro 2020: England lose 2–3 on penalties to Italy, following a 1–1 draw after extra time, in the UEFA European Championship final at Wembley Stadium. The game, broadcast live on both BBC One and ITV, has an estimated peak TV audience of almost 31 million, making it the most-watched UK event since the funeral of Princess Diana in 1997.
- 12 July
  - Home Secretary Priti Patel announces that white supremacist hate group The Base will be the fifth extreme right-wing group to be proscribed in the UK under anti-terror laws.
  - COVID-19 in the UK: Johnson confirms that the fourth and final stage of the government's conditional lockdown easing will proceed as planned on 19 July.
  - Unforeseen floods cause travel chaos in parts of London.
- 13 July – The House of Commons votes by 333 to 298 (a majority of 35) to keep the budget for international development at 0.5% of national income, below the previous commitment of 0.7%.
- 14 July
  - John Lewis and Waitrose announce that they plan to cut one thousand jobs.
  - The Health and Care Bill passes its second reading in the House of Commons.
- 15 July
  - Europe's largest battery storage project, a 100-megawatt system delivered by Shell-owned Limejump, begins operations at Minety in Wiltshire.
  - Five people are arrested after England footballers were racially abused online following their Euro 2020 final defeat.
  - The selection process for eight new hospitals in England is launched.
- 16 July – COVID-19 in the UK: The daily infection count from the virus exceeds 50,000 for the first time since mid-January, with 51,870 new cases reported.
- 17 July
  - COVID-19 in the UK:
    - Health Secretary Sajid Javid tests positive for the virus.
    - Welsh lockdown rules ease further, allowing six people to meet in private homes and holiday accommodation, while organised indoor events can include 1,000 seated and up to 200 standing. Ice rinks are also allowed to reopen.
  - Four people are arrested as a protest by Animal Rebellion continues outside one of McDonald's main UK suppliers.
  - Northern Ireland experiences its hottest day on record, reaching 31.2 °C in County Down, above the previous high of 30.8 °C set in the summers of 1976 and 1983.
- 19 July
  - COVID-19 in the UK:
    - Most remaining legal restrictions on social contact in England are removed.
    - Restrictions are further relaxed in Scotland with changes including 15 people from different households being allowed to meet outdoors, 8 adults indoors and 10 at a pub or restaurant. Booking restrictions at catering facilities are also relaxed and soft play centres can reopen.
    - The COVID-19 vaccine roll out is expanded to many more under 18s in the UK. Based on scientific advice, the minimum age for vaccinating vulnerable adolescents or those who live with adults that are in a high risk group is reduced from 16 to 12. All young people will now also be eligible for their first dose three months before their 18th birthday.
  - The Met Office issues its first ever "Amber Extreme Heat Warning", as temperatures exceed 30 °C across large swathes of the UK, with conditions expected to continue for several days.
  - The FTSE 100 falls by 150 points, dropping below the 7000 mark and to its lowest level for several months, as part of a global sell-off.
  - Iceland and Greene King shut sites due to staff being forced to isolate by the NHS COVID-19 app.
- 21 July
  - Liverpool is stripped of its UNESCO World Heritage status after developments along the city's waterfront.
  - COVID-19 in the UK: Retail industry leaders warn of supermarkets being under increasing pressure to keep shelves fully stocked, due to thousands of shop workers having to self-isolate.
- 22 July
  - Far-right and anti-Islam activist Tommy Robinson loses a High Court libel case brought by Syrian schoolboy Jamal Hijazi and is ordered to pay him £100,000 in damages.
  - Labour MP Dawn Butler is ejected from the House of Commons by deputy speaker Judith Cummins after repeatedly calling Boris Johnson a liar.
- 25 July
  - COVID-19 in the UK: Health Secretary Sajid Javid is criticised for using the word "cower" when he tweeted "Please – if you haven't yet – get your jab, as we learn to live with, rather than cower from, this virus". He later deletes the tweet and issues a public apology.
  - 2021 European floods: Torrential rain causes flooding in many parts of London. East London's Whipps Cross and Newham hospitals declare major incidents, and tell patients to use other A&Es for urgent care, while ambulances are redirected.
- 27 July – COVID-19 in the UK: The daily number of new infections falls for the seventh day in a row, roughly halving from the previous week to 23,511. However, 131 deaths are reported, the highest figure since March.
- 28 July
  - Orbital O2, the world's most powerful tidal turbine device, begins generating electricity via the grid in Eday, the Orkney islands.
  - The Slate Landscape of Northwest Wales is given UNESCO World Heritage status after the World Heritage Committee approved the UK bid.
  - A coroner rules that Andrew Devine, 55, who died 32 years after suffering severe and irreversible brain damage at Hillsborough, was unlawfully killed, and is therefore the 97th victim of the disaster.
- 29 July
  - COVID-19 in the UK: Public Health England reports that the UK's vaccination programme has prevented an estimated 60,000 deaths and 22,057,000 infections.
  - Climate change in the UK: according to the latest State of the UK Climate report published by the Met Office, 2020 was the third warmest, fifth wettest and eighth sunniest year on record. The lead author says this and the trend since 1990 shows climate change is already happening in the UK.
  - Plans for a UK Holocaust Memorial at the Victoria Tower Gardens in London are given the go-ahead by the Ministry of Housing, Communities and Local Government.
- 30 July – The High Court of England and Wales rules that the approval of the Stonehenge road tunnel was unlawful

=== August ===
- 1 August – Four of the eight cooling towers at Eggborough power station, a former coal power plant in Yorkshire, are demolished.
- 4 August – COVID-19 in the UK: The Joint Committee on Vaccination and Immunisation recommends that all 16 and 17-year-olds should be offered a first vaccine dose, meaning 1.4 million teenagers would be eligible. The rollout begins two days later.
- 7 August – COVID-19 in the UK: With some exceptions, such as compulsory mask wearing in certain settings, most remaining pandemic related restrictions conclude in Wales.
- 9 August
  - COVID-19 in the UK: The bulk of pandemic related restrictions are removed in Scotland. Rules that remain include compulsory mask wearing in some locations and restrictions surrounding the administration of schools in the early part of the new academic year.
  - The UK imposes a new package of trade, financial and aviation sanctions on Belarus, in response to continued human rights violations and the undermining of democracy by the Lukashenko regime.
- 10 August
  - A lawsuit is filed in New York against Prince Andrew, accusing him of sexually abusing Virginia Giuffre.
  - COVID-19 vaccination in the UK: The government reports that 75% of UK adults have now received both vaccine doses.
  - A fire at the Bilsdale transmitting station cuts off TV and radio services for 1 million people across North Yorkshire, Teesside and part of County Durham.
- 12 August – Six people, including the suspected gunman, are killed in a shooting in Plymouth. It is the first fatal mass shooting in the UK since 2010.
- 13 August – Boris Johnson chairs a COBRA meeting to discuss the Taliban offensive in Afghanistan.
- 16 August – Well known stand-up comedian and 8 Out of 10 Cats team captain Sean Lock dies aged 58 from advanced lung cancer having been diagnosed with the disease a few years prior to his death
- 17 August
  - The Office for National Statistics reports that UK job vacancies reached a record high of 953,000 in the three months to July, while average pay rose 7.4 percent.
  - COVID-19 vaccination in the UK: The Medicines and Healthcare products Regulatory Agency approves Moderna's COVID-19 vaccine for use in children aged 12 to 17 years.
- 18 August
  - Parliament is recalled from its summer recess to discuss the situation in Afghanistan following the fall of Kabul to the Taliban.
  - The government announces a citizens' resettlement scheme for 5,000 Afghan nationals who are at risk due to the current crisis, which could be expanded to 20,000 in the longer term.
- 19 August – COVID-19 vaccination in the UK: Health Secretary Sajid Javid announces a vaccine booster scheme, with adults over 50 likely to be offered a third dose, beginning in September with the most vulnerable groups.
- 20 August
  - COVID-19 in the UK: Ronapreve, a monoclonal antibody treatment to prevent and treat COVID-19, is approved by the MHRA. It is shown to lower hospitalisation or mortality by 70% and to shorten the duration of symptoms by four days.
  - The SNP and Scottish Greens announce a new power sharing arrangement, which includes a commitment to hold a referendum on Scottish independence after the Covid pandemic has passed and within the next five years.
- 22 August – The two chimney stacks, the main boiler house and bunker bay are demolished in a controlled demolition at Ferrybridge Power Station in Knottingley, West Yorkshire.
- 23 August – COVID-19 vaccination in the UK: The government agrees a contract for 35 million more doses of the Pfizer/BioNTech vaccine, to be administered in 2022.
- 27 August – The last evacuation flight for British nationals and Afghans who are eligible for resettlement in the UK leaves Hamid Karzai International Airport. The UK government later confirms that all British soldiers, diplomats and other officials have been removed from Afghanistan by the following day.
- 31 August – BBC journalist Sarah Rainsford returns to the UK after being permanently expelled from Russia for "the protection of the security of Russia".

=== September ===
- September – Great Britain suffers a fuel supply crisis towards the end of the month, due to panic buying caused by media reports of a leaked government briefing discussing the shortage of HGV drivers.
- 1 September – Foreign Secretary Dominic Raab appears before MPs of the Foreign Affairs Select Committee and is questioned about the ending of the UK's campaign in Afghanistan.
- 6 September
  - The government announces a plan to increase the limit for human sperm, egg and embryo cryopreservation from 10 to 55 years.
  - COVID-19 in the UK: The total number of confirmed infections since the start of the pandemic exceeds 7 million.
- 7 September – In the Commons, Johnson reveals the government's long-awaited plan for social care reforms, including a 1.25% rise in National Insurance to raise £36bn over three years, and a cap of £86,000 on lifetime care costs in England.
- 8 September – MPs vote in favour of the government's NHS and social care tax rise plan by 319 votes to 248, a majority of 71.
- 9 September – COVID-19 vaccination in the UK: The JCVI approves the use of the Pfizer–BioNTech and Oxford–AstraZeneca vaccines as COVID-19 booster shots, paving the way for a rollout ahead of the winter.
- 11 September – British player Emma Raducanu wins the 2021 US Open Women's Singles on her first attempt. Raducanu becomes the first qualifier in history, male or female, to win a Grand Slam tournament and the first female British player to win a major since Virginia Wade at Wimbledon in 1977. She also won the tournament without losing a set. She is the second British player to do this male or female after Angela Mortimer Barrett at the 1958 Australian Championships.
- 12 September – COVID-19 in the UK: A plan for vaccine passports in England is ditched by the government, but kept "in reserve" should it be needed over autumn or winter.
- 13 September – COVID-19 vaccination in the UK: The UK's four chief medical officers recommend that children aged 12–15 should be vaccinated against COVID-19, initially with a single dose, leaving the possibility for a second dose in spring 2022.
- 14 September – COVID-19 vaccination in the UK: The JCVI recommends a booster shot against COVID-19 for the over 50s and at-risk groups, preferably the Pfizer–BioNTech vaccine, meaning about 30 million adults should receive a third dose.
- 15 September
  - The Consumer Price Index jumps from 2 to 3.2%, its biggest increase since 1997.
  - Johnson reshuffles the cabinet. Dominic Raab is appointed Deputy Prime Minister of the United Kingdom.
  - The UK joins AUKUS, a trilateral security pact with Australia and the United States, to counter the influence of China.
- 16 September
  - COVID-19 vaccination in the UK: The booster programme begins in England and Wales, starting with NHS staff.
  - Co-op Food announces a partnership with Amazon Prime, enabling same-day grocery deliveries, while also expanding the use of robots from 200 to 500 units.
- 18 September – Princess Beatrice gives birth to her first child, a baby girl.
- 20 September
  - Business Secretary Kwasi Kwarteng holds crisis talks with industry bosses, as firms struggle to stay afloat amid a surge in natural gas wholesale prices.
  - The Northern line extension to Battersea opens, the first major expansion of the London Underground in over 20 years.
- 23 September – The government announces plans to prevent employers in the hospitality industry from withholding tips given by customers to staff.
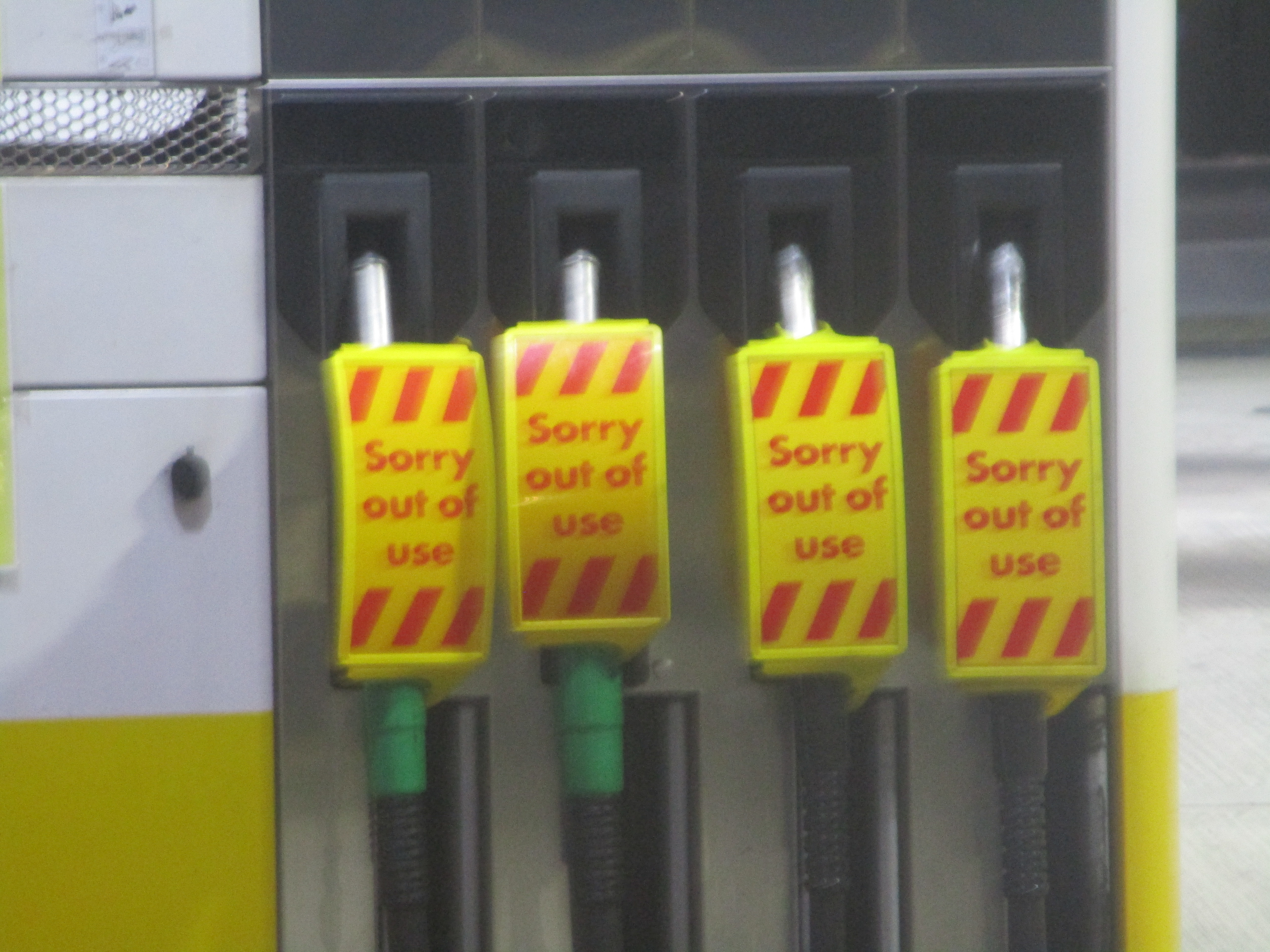
  Empty pumps during the Autumn fuel panic on 25 September
- 26 September – 2021 fuel supply crisis: Amid panic buying at petrol stations, ministers suspend competition laws to enable fuel suppliers to talk to one another and prioritise locations most in need.
- 27 September – 2021 fuel supply crisis: 50% to 90% of fuel stations in some regions of England have run dry, according to Petrol Retailers Association (PRA) members.
- 28 September
  - Katie Price is hospitalised after a car crash in Horsham. The following day, she pleads guilty to three charges of drunk driving, driving without insurance and driving while disqualified.
  - The United Kingdom's international vehicle registration code is officially changed from "GB" to "UK", after more than 110 years.
- 29 September
  - 2021 fuel supply crisis: Businesses involved in the fuel industry issue a joint statement saying that they are "now seeing signs that the situation at the pumps has begun to improve".
  - Labour leader Keir Starmer gives his first in-person speech at the party's annual conference.
- 30 September
  - Former police officer Wayne Couzens, who pleaded guilty to the murder of Sarah Everard, is sentenced at the Old Bailey to a whole-life tariff. Lord Justice Fulford calls the case "devastating, tragic and wholly brutal" and tells Couzens he has eroded public confidence in the police.
  - The UK Government announces the establishment of a Household Support Fund, to be administered by local councils and available from 6 October onwards.

=== October ===
- 5 October – Flooding hits parts of London following torrential rain overnight, with Knightsbridge and Kensington particularly badly affected.
- 6 October
  - The £20 weekly increase to Universal Credit is withdrawn, 18 months after its introduction.
  - Amazon opens its first non-food store in the UK, at Bluewater Shopping Centre near Dartford.
  - Boris Johnson delivers his speech to the Conservative Party Conference in Manchester, his first in-person address to Tory members since the COVID-19 pandemic.
  - The natural gas trading price rises to its highest ever level, increasing by 37% in the morning, recovering later in the day to finish 9% down on the day's starting price.
- 7 October – After an agreement fell through in 2020 with owner Mike Ashley, Saudi-led consortium Public Investment Fund buys 80% of Newcastle United's shares worth £300m, making Newcastle the richest British football club, surpassing Manchester City.
- 9 October – COVID-19 vaccination in the UK: The number of people receiving a third vaccine dose exceeds 2 million.
- 10 October – The four remaining cooling towers at Eggborough Power Station are demolished with explosives.
- 11 October – A question on sexual activities in areas with widespread HIV transmission will be removed following recommendations to make blood donation inclusive.
- 12 October – COVID-19 in the UK: A joint report from the Health & Social Care and Science and Technology Select Committee describes the decisions on lockdowns and social distancing during the early weeks of the pandemic, and the advice that led to them, as "one of the most important public health failures the UK has ever experienced", and the vaccination approach, including its research, development, and rollout as "one of the most effective initiatives in UK history".
- 14 October
  - In a BBC interview about the Earthshot Prize, Prince William talks about "climate anxiety" among younger generations, and suggests that rich entrepreneurs should be "trying to repair this planet, not trying to find the next place to go and live".
  - North Yorkshire Police, Fire and Crime Commissioner Philip Allott resigns following comments surrounding the murder of Sarah Everard.
- 15 October
  - Conservative MP Sir David Amess dies after being stabbed multiple times during his constituency surgery at Belfairs Methodist Church in Leigh-on-Sea. Police arrest a 25-year-old male British national, and treat the killing as an act of terror.
  - COVID-19 in the UK: NHS Test and Trace suspends testing provided by a private laboratory in Wolverhampton amid fears up to 43,000 people were given the wrong result for COVID-19 tests. The Health Security Agency announces it will hold a 'serious incident investigation' into the matter.
  - The contactless payment limit is increased from £45 to £100.
- 18 October – A minute's silence is held for Sir David Amess in the House of Commons. Boris Johnson pays tribute to Amess and announces that Southend-on-Sea will become a city, a status which the murdered MP had long campaigned for.
- 19 October
  - Tesco opens its first checkout-free store, known as GetGo, similar in format to the automated Amazon Go stores.
  - The government announces grants of £5,000 to replace old gas boilers with heat pumps and other low-carbon technology, as part of its plan to phase out the sale of new gas boilers by 2035. Experts criticise the plans as unambitious, given that only 90,000 heat pumps will be installed over three years, out of 25 million homes with gas boilers.
- 20 October – COVID-19 in the UK: In a Downing Street press conference, Sajid Javid announces the securing of two new antiviral drug deals for the UK. He warns that daily case numbers could reach 100,000 and urges the public to remain cautious.
- 21 October
  - COVID-19 in the UK:
    - With daily infections above 40,000 for eight consecutive days, the British Medical Association accuses the government of being "wilfully negligent" for not reimposing rules such as mandatory face masks.
    - The number of daily infections exceeds 50,000 for the first time since July.
- 24 October – COVID-19 vaccination in the UK: The number of people receiving a third vaccine dose exceeds 5 million. The NHS reports 325,000 booster jabs administered on Saturday, a new record number.
- 25 October – London's Ultra Low Emission Zone is expanded by 18 times, to include the area within the North and South Circular Roads.
- 26 October – Following a recent overnight stay in hospital, Buckingham Palace confirms that the Queen will be unable to attend the upcoming COP26 climate change conference in Glasgow.
- 27 October
  - Police make 31 arrests as members of Insulate Britain glue themselves to roads around London and Kent.
  - The Budget: Chancellor Rishi Sunak presents his autumn statement, designed to help the UK emerge from the COVID-19 pandemic. This includes a £150bn increase in departmental spending, an increase in the National Living Wage from £8.91 to £9.50, a cut in the Universal Credit taper rate from 63% to 55%, and the biggest cut to business rates in over 30 years.
  - COVID-19 in the UK: Labour leader Keir Starmer goes into self-isolation after testing positive for coronavirus. Shadow Chancellor Rachel Reeves takes his place at the despatch box in the House of Commons.
- 28 October
  - At the Old Bailey, Danyal Hussein is sentenced to a minimum of 35 years in prison for the murders of Bibaa Henry and Nicole Smallman, two sisters he stabbed to death at random in Wembley Park.
  - Sidney Cooke, 94, one of the UK's most notorious paedophiles and serial killers, is denied parole for the tenth time. Cooke was jailed for life with a minimum five-year term in 1999 for the abuse of two brothers.
- 31 October
  - Twelve people are injured following a rail crash in Salisbury, Wiltshire.
  - The two-week United Nations Climate Change Conference (COP26) is held in Glasgow, after being postponed in 2020 due to the COVID-19 pandemic. A deal is agreed by world leaders, which includes a "phasedown" of unabated coal power, a 30% cut in methane emissions by 2030, plans for a halt to deforestation by 2030, and increased financial support for developing countries.

=== November ===
- 3 November – After the Parliamentary Commissioner for Standards found that Conservative MP Owen Paterson breached lobbying rules, with a recommended 30-day suspension, the House of Commons votes by 250 to 232 to postpone the decision whilst a review of the investigating watchdog is undertaken.
- 4 November
  - Owen Paterson steps down as an MP after 24 years in politics, calling the past two years "an indescribable nightmare for my family and me".
  - Former Labour MP Claudia Webbe is given a 10-week sentence, suspended for two years, after being convicted of harassment.
  - Leader of the House, Jacob Rees-Mogg, announces that the planned overhaul of the standards system will not, in fact, go ahead without cross-party support.
  - COVID-19 in the UK: The UK becomes the first country in the world to approve molnupiravir, an oral antiviral pill for COVID-19 that cuts the risk of hospitalisation or death by half.
- 7 November – COVID-19 vaccination in the UK: The number of people receiving a third vaccine dose exceeds 10 million.
- 9 November – Footballer Marcus Rashford is awarded an MBE for his campaigning to help vulnerable children.
- 11 November – A record daily number of migrant crossings between France and the UK is reported, with around 1,000 people intercepted by border patrols. The cumulative total of 23,000 for the year is far higher than previous years.
- 14 November
  - The Queen expresses her "great regret" at missing the Remembrance Sunday service at the Cenotaph in London after spraining her back.
  - COVID-19 vaccination in the UK: The number of children aged between 12 and 15 having received a first vaccine dose exceeds one million.
  - COP26: Following the conclusion of the UN Climate Change Conference in Glasgow, Boris Johnson appears at No 10 for a press conference with Alok Sharma. He describes the deal secured by world leaders as a "game-changing agreement" which sounds "the death knell for coal power".
  - Three men are arrested under the Terrorism Act after a car explodes outside Liverpool Women's Hospital, killing one man and injuring another.
- 15 November
  - The UK terror threat level is raised from substantial to severe, meaning an attack is "highly likely", after the Liverpool Women's Hospital bombing.
  - COVID-19 vaccination in the UK: The JCVI announces that the booster jab programme should be extended to those aged 40 to 49. It also recommends that 16 and 17 year olds, who were initially offered only a single dose, should now get a second.
- 16 November – Ex-Yorkshire cricketer Azeem Rafiq tells the Culture and Sport Committee he was treated in an "inhuman" way by his club when his unborn son died, as he gives evidence to MPs about racism, saying it is "institutional in cricket".
- 17 November – The UK inflation rate hits 4.2%, its highest level for 10 years and more than double the Bank of England's target, driven mainly by higher fuel and energy prices.
- 18 November – High Speed 2: The government announces that the HS2 sections to Leeds from both the East Midlands and Manchester will be scrapped in favour of an earlier upgrade to the existing route between Manchester and Leeds. The transport secretary, Grant Shapps says the plan is "ambitious and unparalleled" and that it reduces journey times from Manchester to Leeds from 55 to 33 minutes, and from Birmingham to Nottingham by more than an hour to 26 minutes. The £96bn plans are criticised by shadow transport secretary, Jim McMahon, who says in the Commons that the government has broken its promise and "completely sold out" the north.
- 24 November – November 2021 English Channel disaster: An inflatable dinghy carrying 30 migrants capsizes while attempting to reach the UK from France, resulting in 27 deaths and one missing. The victims include a pregnant woman and three children. The incident is the deadliest of its kind on record.
- 25 November
  - The National Trust announces a ban on trail hunting on its land.
  - COVID-19 in the UK: The UK becomes the fourth country to surpass 10 million COVID-19 cases after the United States, India and Brazil.
- 26 November
  - Hamas is proscribed in its entirety as a terrorist organisation.
  - A feasibility study into the proposed Irish Sea Bridge concludes that such a route is technically possible, but would cost up to £335bn and require 30 years to construct. A tunnel option is put at £209bn.
  - COVID-19 in the UK: Amid international concerns over B.1.1.529, a highly mutated variant of COVID-19 that appears more infectious than Delta, six countries in Southern Africa are placed on the UK's travel red list. The government confirms that no cases have yet been detected in the UK.
  - Two people are killed as Storm Arwen hits the British Isles. Widespread damage and travel disruption is reported in Scotland and North East England, with 100,000 people losing power.
- 27 November – COVID-19 in the UK: Two cases of B.1.1.529, now designated by the WHO as the Omicron variant, are reported in the UK. Johnson holds a press conference at Downing Street with Sir Patrick Vallance and Professor Chris Whitty, in which the public are told that all international arrivals entering England must take a PCR test and self-isolate until they receive a negative result, while all contacts of suspected Omicron cases must self-isolate for 10 days, regardless of their vaccination status. It is also announced that face coverings will become compulsory on public transport and in shops (excluding hospitality) from 30 November.
- 30 November – The Queen congratulates Barbados as it becomes a republic, meaning she is no longer its head of state. The country remains part of the Commonwealth of Nations.

=== December ===
- 1 December – The British Armed Forces announces that it will now allow those with HIV and taking antiretrovirals to serve, with those diagnosed to be allowed without restrictions from spring 2022, ending a barrier for such individuals. Medications will also be freely available for such personnel.
- 2 December – COVID-19 vaccination in the UK: The government orders 114 million more doses, 60 million of the Moderna vaccine and 54 million of the Pfizer–BioNTech COVID-19 vaccine, to use in 2022 and 2023.
- 3 December
  - Emma Tustin and Thomas Hughes are jailed over the torture and killing of Hughes' six-year-old son, Arthur Labinjo-Hughes. Hughes, found guilty of his manslaughter, is jailed for 21 years. His partner Tustin, found guilty of murdering the boy, receives a minimum of 29 years.
  - COVID-19 in the UK: The number of confirmed cases of Omicron in the UK exceeds 100. The Health Security Agency publishes a risk assessment of the new variant.
- 4 December – The Attorney-General announces a review of the sentences given to Emma Tustin and Thomas Hughes to "determine whether they were too low".
- 5 December – Business Secretary Kwasi Kwarteng visits North East England where thousands of homes remain without power more than a week after Storm Arwen. The Army and Royal Marines continue to deliver supplies to affected residents, as power firms work to repair the last outages.
- 6 December – COVID-19 in the UK: Sajid Javid confirms that community transmission of the Omicron variant, i.e. not linked to international travel, is occurring across multiple regions.
- 7 December – Severe weather warnings are issued for most of the UK as Storm Barra makes landfall.
- 8 December
  - COVID-19 in the UK: "Plan B" is announced by Boris Johnson, which introduces further restrictions on social gatherings. This includes a requirement to work from home wherever possible, the use of face coverings extended to include more venues, and the NHS Covid Pass or a negative lateral flow test for entry to crowded events (subject to parliamentary approval).
  - COVID-19 vaccination in the UK: The booster jab program opens to over-40s, meaning an extra seven million people can get a third vaccine dose.
  - Former Downing Street Press Secretary Allegra Stratton resigns as government spokesperson for COP26, after footage emerges of her and colleagues during a mock press conference on 22 December 2020, making joking references to an alleged Christmas gathering in 10 Downing Street four days earlier. Boris Johnson apologises for the video in the House of Commons during Prime Minister's Questions, with opposition parties criticising him. An investigation is launched by Simon Case.
- 9 December
  - The Conservative Party is fined £17,800 by the Electoral Commission after failing to accurately report a donation that paid for Johnson's flat refurbishment, and for failing to keep a proper accounting record.
  - The official investigation into government staff parties, alleged to have taken place during lockdown in late 2020, is widened to include a total of three events. Labour calls for Johnson to resign if he is found to have misled Parliament on the issue.
  - Longannet power station, the last remaining coal-fired power station in Scotland, is demolished.
- 10 December
  - The High Court rules that WikiLeaks founder Julian Assange can be extradited from the UK to the US.
  - COVID-19 in the UK: The daily infection number reaches the highest level since January, at 58,194.
- 12 December
  - The Daily Mirror publishes a leaked photo of Johnson at a virtual Christmas quiz in Downing Street on 15 December 2020, sitting in-person with two colleagues, when London was under COVID-19 lockdown rules that prohibited household mixing.
  - COVID-19 in the UK:
    - The COVID alert level is increased to four, meaning transmission is "high or rising exponentially", due to a rapid increase in Omicron cases. An additional 1,239 Omicron cases are reported, marking the biggest daily rise to date and bringing the total confirmed number in the UK to 3,137.
    - In a televised address, Johnson warns of "a tidal wave of Omicron coming" as he brings forward a target to give all over-18s a booster jab by one month to the end of December. This will mean the booster jab rollout needing to increase to a million a day, he explains, nearly doubling the current 530,000 daily figure.
- 13 December
  - Campaign Against Antisemitism organise a demonstration outside Broadcasting House to protest against the BBC's coverage of a recent antisemitic attack on Oxford Street.
  - COVID-19 in the UK:
    - The first UK death from the Omicron variant is reported.
    - Shortages of lateral flow tests are reported.
- 14 December – COVID-19 in the UK: Passes for entry to large venues like nightclubs in England win the backing of MPs by 369 votes to 126, despite a rebellion by Conservative backbenchers.
- 15 December
  - Inflation reaches 5.1%, up from 4.2% the previous month and its highest level in 10 years.
  - A leaked photo emerges of former London mayoral candidate Shaun Bailey and 23 colleagues holding a gathering at the Conservative headquarters in London, during the COVID-19 restrictions of December 2020, provoking allegations that the restrictions had been broken. However, on 11 November 2022, the police clear Bailey, and all others in attendance at the gathering, of any wrongdoing.
  - COVID-19 in the UK: The UK records its highest number of daily cases since the pandemic began, at 78,610.
- 16 December
  - The Bank of England raises interest rates for the first time in more than three years, from 0.1% to 0.25%, in response to surging inflation.
  - 2021 North Shropshire by-election: Liberal Democrats candidate Helen Morgan wins the seat vacated by Owen Paterson. The swing of 34.16% is the seventh largest in UK by-election history and the seat had been held by Conservatives since 1906.
- 17 December – Simon Case recuses himself from his role of leading an inquiry into alleged government staff parties during lockdown, after it is reported that a similar event was also held in his own office.
- 18 December
  - COVID-19 in the UK: London Mayor Sadiq Khan declares a major incident in the capital, due to the rapid spread of the Omicron variant.
  - Lord Frost resigns as Minister of State for the Cabinet Office, citing "concerns about the current direction of travel" of the government.
- 19 December
  - Piers Corbyn is arrested by the Metropolitan Police after a video emerges of him urging people to "hammer to death those scum, those scum who have decided to go ahead with introducing new fascism", as well as suggesting that the offices of MPs who had voted for COVID-19 restrictions should be burned down.
  - The Guardian publishes a photo of Boris Johnson, his wife, and 17 staff members in the Downing Street garden with cheese and wine in May 2020, at a time when large social gatherings were prohibited due to COVID-19. Johnson's spokesman tells the newspaper that the photo shows a work meeting, not a social event.
- 20 December
  - Hornsea Two Wind Farm, the world's largest offshore array, is reported to be generating power for the first time.
- 22 December
  - COVID-19 in the UK:
    - Another record high of 106,122 new infections is reported, the first time the daily case number has exceeded 100,000.
    - Preliminary studies of the Omicron variant suggest that it could be milder than Delta, with a 30% to 70% reduction in those needing hospital treatment; however, the increased transmissibility may still overwhelm hospitals, through the sheer number of cases.
- 23 December – COVID-19 in the UK: Another record high of 119,789 new infections is reported.
- 25 December – 19-year-old Jaswant Singh Chail breaks into the grounds of Windsor Castle carrying a crossbow with the intention of assassinating the Queen. He is arrested after several hours and later sectioned under the Mental Health Act 2007 and pleads guilty to charges under the Treason Act 1842.
- 28 December – COVID-19 in the UK: Another record high of 129,471 new infections is reported.
- 30 December
  - COVID-19 in the UK: Another record high of 189,213 new infections is reported, which includes a five-day Christmas backlog for Northern Ireland, and a two-day backlog for Wales.
  - A 16-year-old boy dies after being stabbed in Hillingdon, West London, making him the 30th teenage homicide in the capital during 2021, surpassing the previous record high of 29 in 2008.
- 31 December
  - COVID-19 in the UK:
    - Paxlovid is approved by the UK medicines regulator, becoming the second new antiviral pill for Covid in the UK after molnupiravir.
    - Another record high of 189,846 new infections is reported, as the seven day cumulative total exceeds 1 million.
    - Many public New Year's Eve celebrations are cancelled, including Hogmanay in Scotland, due to the prevalence of COVID-19.
  - The warmest New Year's Eve on record is reported, with temperatures of 15.8 °C (60.4 °F) in western England.
  - The newly restored clock face of Big Ben is revealed in time for the new year, following a renovation that began in 2017.

=== Undated ===
- A majority (51.3%) of babies born this year are to mothers who are not married or in a civil partnership at the date of birth for the first time since UK registration began in 1845, continuing a long-term trend.

== Births ==
- 9 February – August Brooksbank, 11th in line to the throne at birth
- 4 June – Princess Lilibet of Sussex, 8th in line to the throne at birth
- 18 September – Sienna Elizabeth Mapelli Mozzi, 11th in line to the throne at birth

== Deaths ==
=== January ===
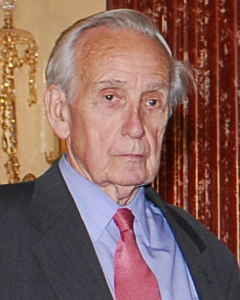
Sir Brian Urquhart in 2006

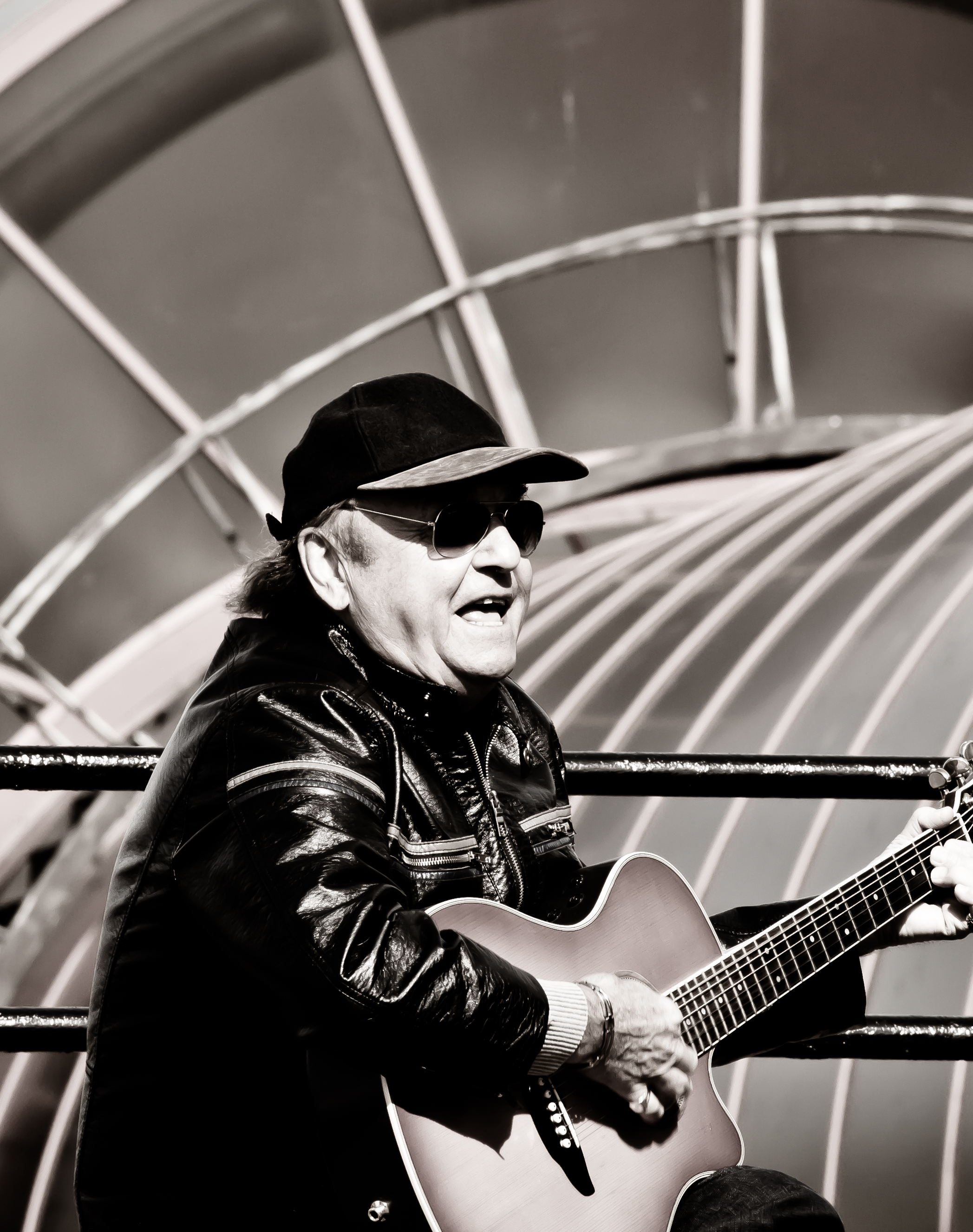
Gerry Marsden in 2011

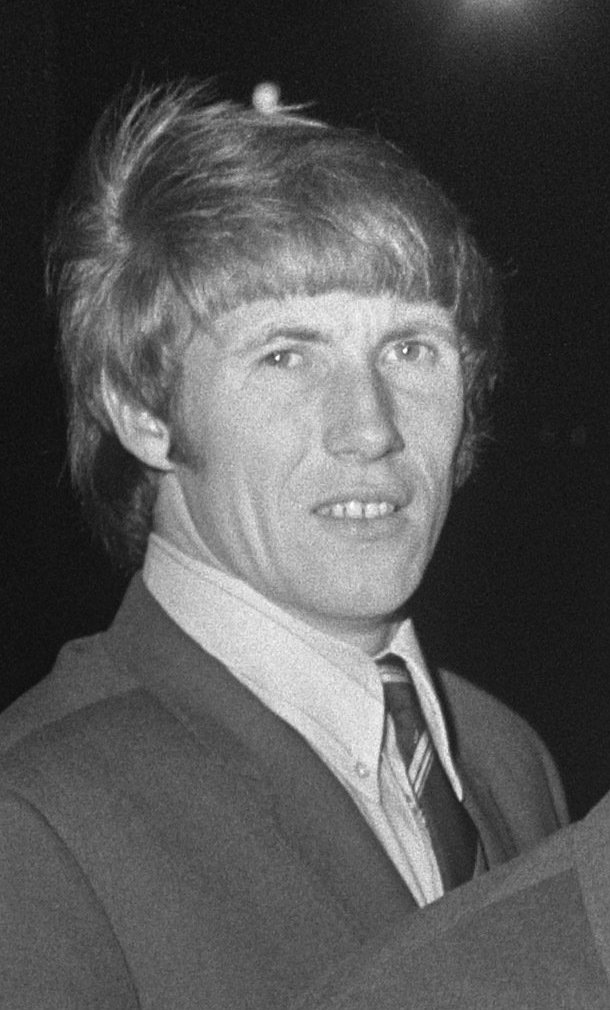
Colin Bell in 1969

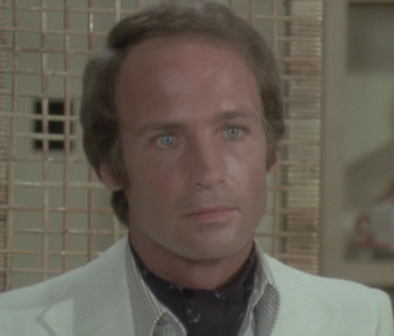
John Richardson in the film L'anatra all'arancia in 1975

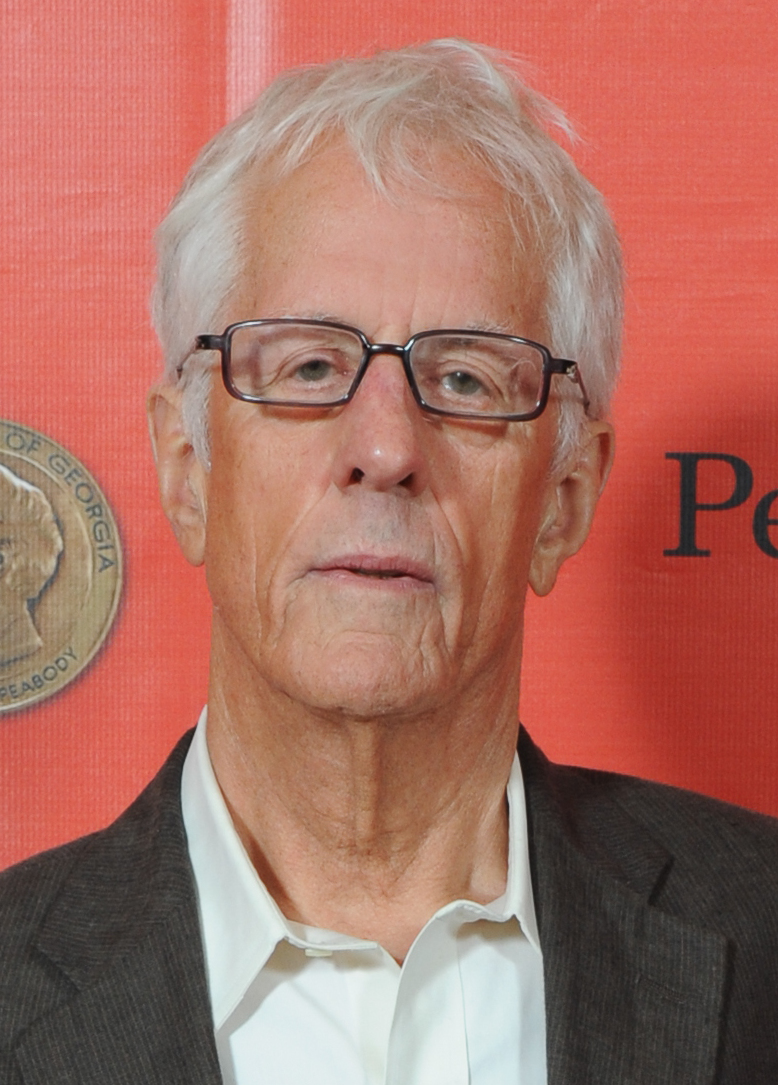
Michael Apted in 2013

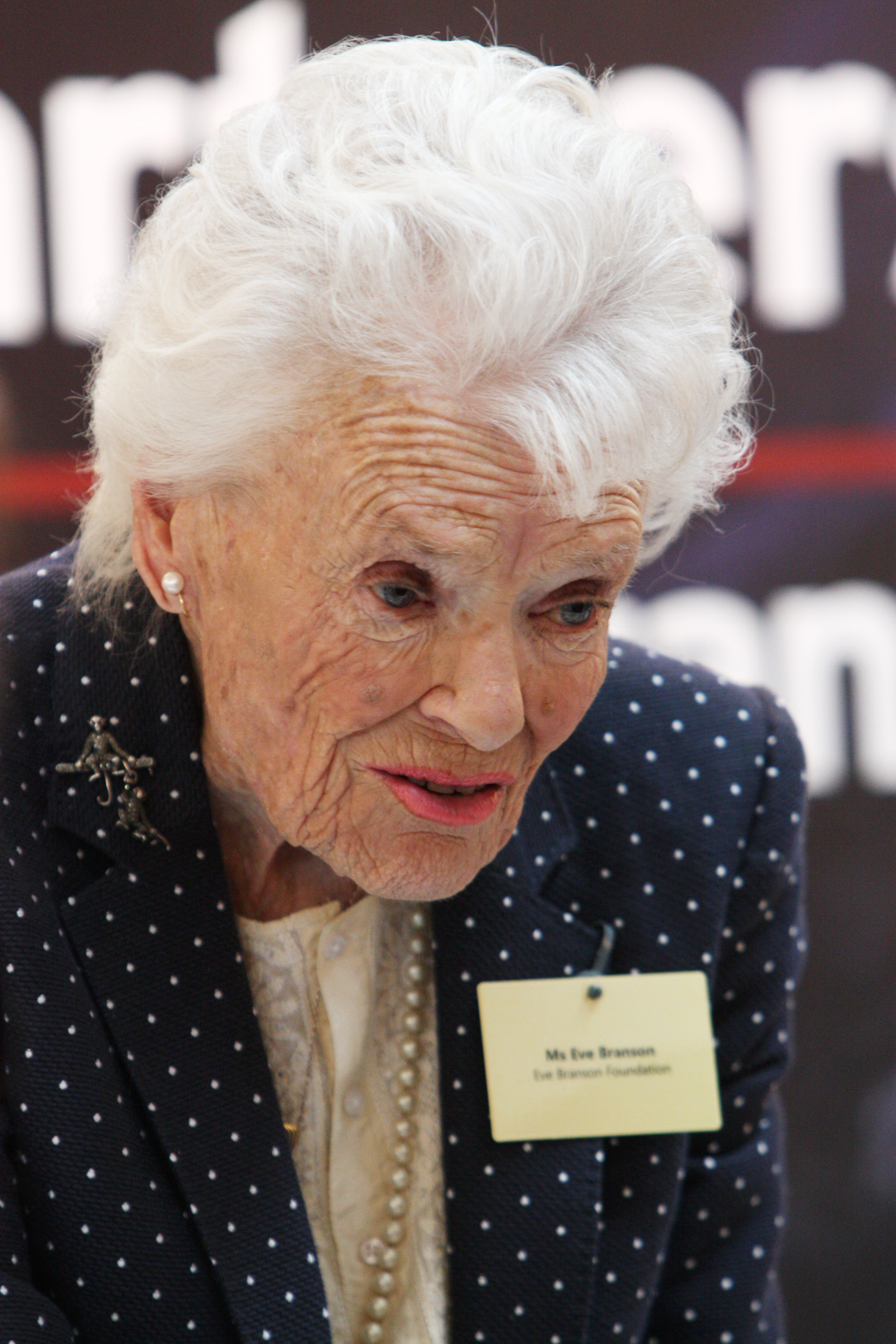
Eve Branson in 2013

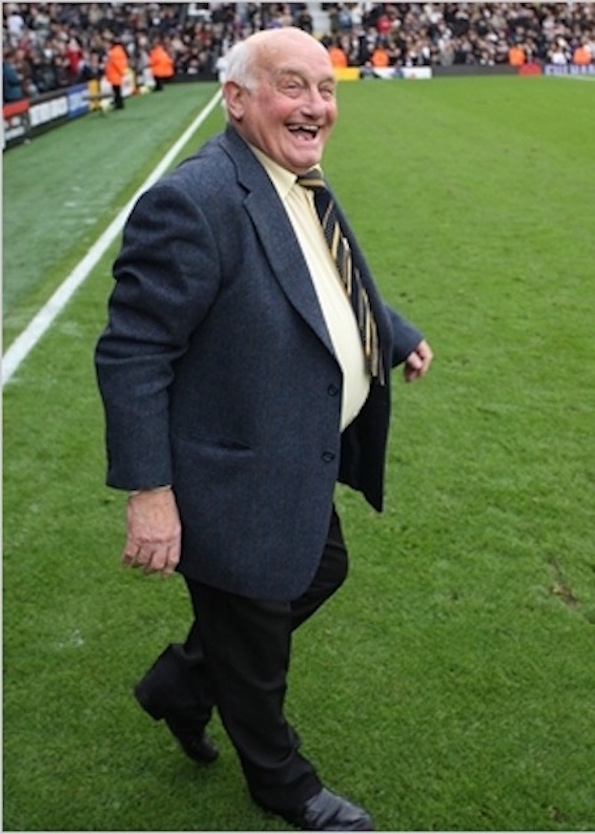
Tosh Chamberlain

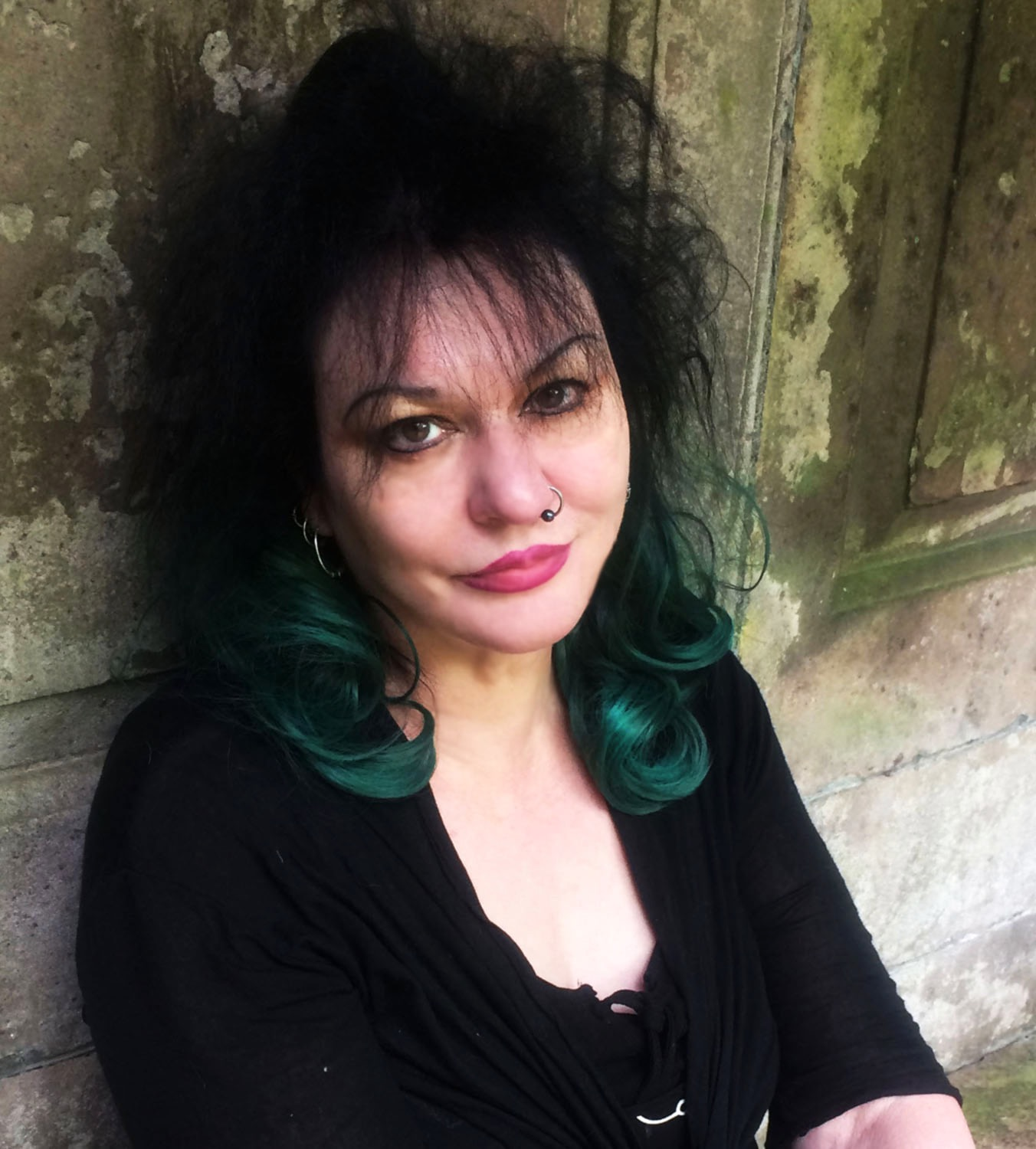
Storm Constantine in 2016

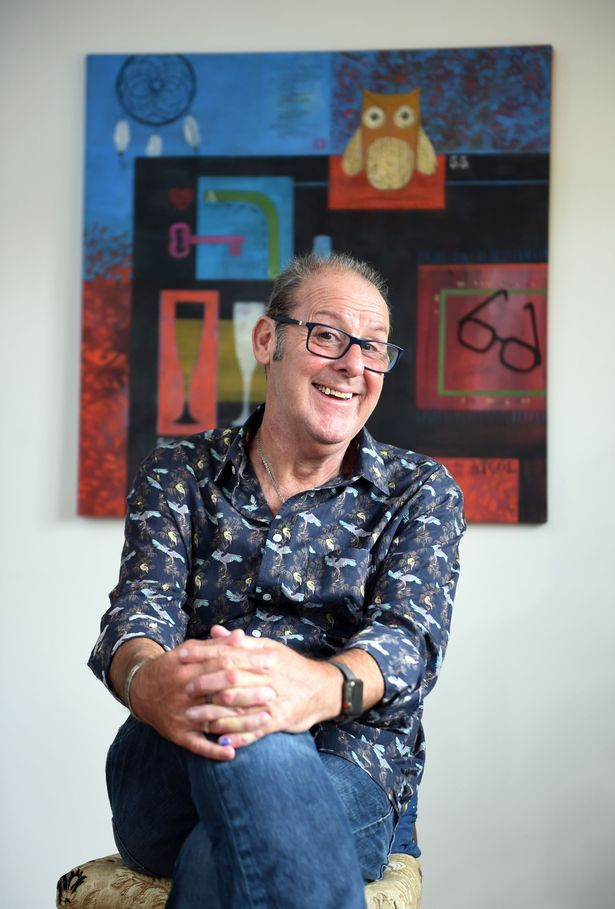
Andy Gray

Gordon McVie

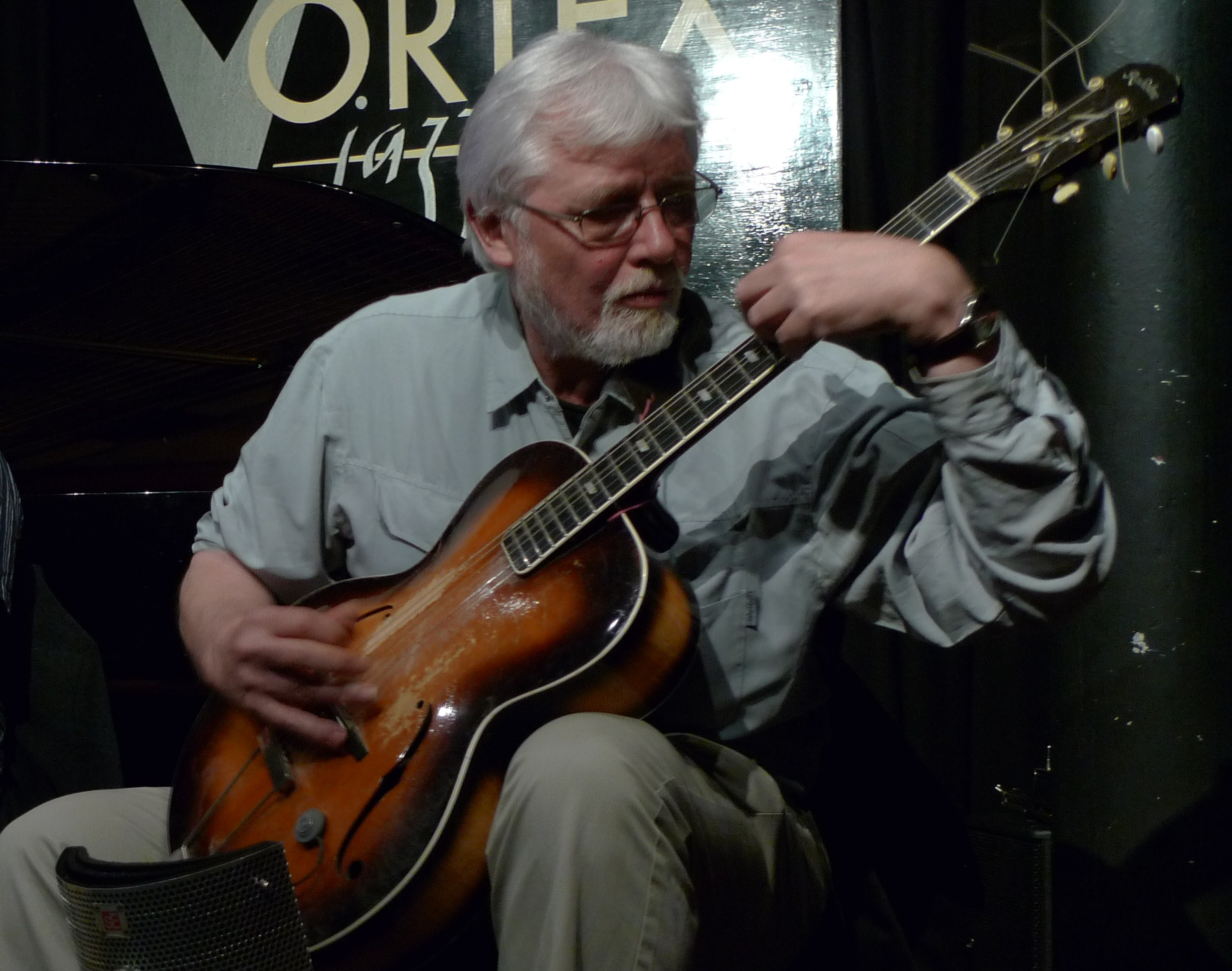
John Russell in 2010

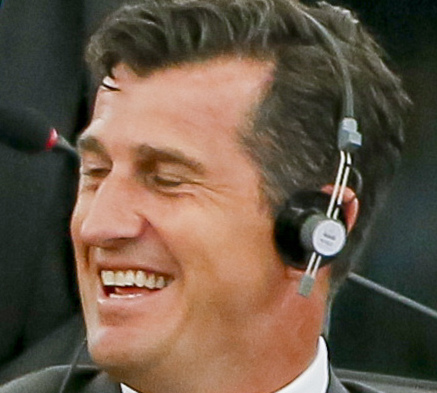
Robert Rowland in 2019

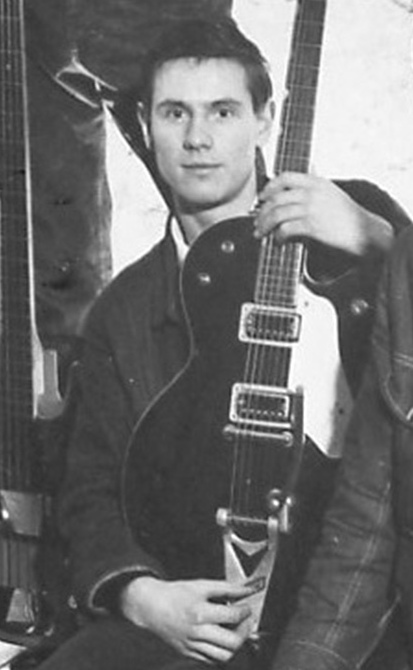
Hilton Valentine

- 1 January –
  - Barry Austin, the UK's fattest man (b. 1968)
  - Dame Margaret Booth, English judge (b. 1933)
  - Clint Boulton, English footballer (Port Vale, Torquay United) (b. 1948)
  - Mark Eden, English actor (b. 1928)
- 2 January –
  - Lady Mary Colman, English socialite and philanthropist (b. 1932).
  - Brian Cowan, Scottish actor (b. 1962)
  - Sir Brian Urquhart, English diplomat (b. 1919)
  - Brian Whitcombe, Welsh rugby union player (b. 1934)
- 3 January –
  - Zoe Davison, English horse trainer (b. 1960)
  - Gerry Marsden, English singer-songwriter, musician and television personality (b. 1942)
- 4 January –
  - Barbara Shelley, English film and television actress (b. 1932)
  - David Thompson, English food manufacturing executive (b. 1936)
  - Kay Ullrich, Scottish politician (b. 1943)
- 5 January –
  - Colin Bell, English footballer (England, Bury, Manchester City) (b. 1946)
  - Osian Ellis, Welsh harpist, composer and teacher (b. 1928)
  - James Greene, Northern Irish actor (b. 1931)
  - John Georgiadis, English violinist and conductor (b. 1939)
  - Happy Man Tree, Tree of the Year (b. 1870)
  - Robert Heptinstall, English pathologist (b. 1920)
  - John Richardson, English actor (b. 1934)
  - William Windham, English Olympic rower (b. 1926)
- 6 January –
  - James Cross, English diplomat (b. 1921)
  - John Land, English field hockey player (b. 1938)
- 7 January –
  - Michael Apted, English director, producer, writer and actor (b. 1941)
  - John Heilpern, English theatre critic (b. 1942)
  - Christopher Little, English literary agent (b. 1941)
- 8 January –
  - Eve Branson, English philanthropist (b. 1924)
  - Bill Nankeville, English Olympic runner (b. 1925)
  - Grace Robertson, English photographer (b. 1930)
  - Michael Shaw, Baron Shaw of Northstead, English politician (b. 1920)
  - Katharine Whitehorn, English journalist (b. 1928)
- 9 January –
  - Patrick Gordon-Duff-Pennington, English farmer and landowner (b. 1930)
  - Ken Middleditch, English motorcycle speedway racer (b. 1925)
  - Ken Sedd, English actor (b. 1939)
- 10 January –
  - Sir David Barclay, English businessman (b. 1934)
  - Arthur Bramley, English footballer (Mansfield Town) (b. 1929)
  - Tosh Chamberlain, English footballer (Fulham) (b. 1934)
  - Tony Gregory, English football player, coach and manager (Luton Town, Watford) (b. 1937)
  - Ron Grigg, English chemist (b. unknown)
  - Mark Keds, English punk musician (b. 1970)
  - Bobby Kellard, English footballer (Southend United, Crystal Palace, Ipswich Town, Portsmouth, Bristol City, Leicester City, Torquay United) (b. 1943)
  - Donald Smith, English cricketer (b. 1923)
- 11 January –
  - Lloyd Cowan, English track and field athlete (b. 1962)
  - Lionel Gossman, Scottish-American literary scholar (b. 1929)
  - Ian Griggs, English bishop (b. 1928)
- 12 January –
  - Sir Robert Cohan, American-English dancer and choreographer (b. 1925)
  - Norman Houston, Northern Irish diplomat (b. 1958)
  - Willie Miller, Scottish urban planner (b. 1950)
  - John G. Ramsay, English structural geologist (b. 1931)
  - Bridget Rowe, English journalist (b. 1950)
  - Dame Margaret Weston, English museum curator (b. 1926)
- 13 January –
  - Kenneth Barker (musicologist), English musicologist (b. 1934)
  - Nicky Booth, English boxer (b. 1980)
  - Gerry Cottle, English circus owner (b. 1945)
  - Philip Tartaglia, Scottish archbishop (b. 1951)
- 14 January –
  - Storm Constantine, English author (b. 1956)
  - Simon Crosse, English Olympic rower (b. 1930)
  - Vincent Logan, Scottish bishop (b. 1941)
  - Jane Sinclair, English priest (b. 1956)
- 15 January –
  - Geoff Barnett, English footballer (Everton, Arsenal) (b. 1946)
  - Mark Langham, English priest (b. 1960)
- 16 January –
  - Charlotte Cornwell, English actress (b. 1949)
  - Chris Cramer, English news journalist (b. 1948)
  - Alan Hart, English television executive (b. 1935)
- 17 January –
  - Keith Arnold, English bishop (b. 1926)
  - Giles Constable, English historian (b. 1929)
  - Haydn Morris, Welsh rugby union player (b. 1928)
- 18 January –
  - Andy Gray, Scottish actor and comedy writer (b. 1959)
  - Sinclair Hood, English archaeologist (b. 1917)
  - Vic Mitchell, English railway preservationist and writer (b. 1934)
- 20 January –
  - Sir Keith Bright, English transport executive (b. 1931)
  - John Jeffers, English footballer (Port Vale, Stockport County) (b. 1968)
  - Gordon McVie, British oncologist (b. 1945)
  - John Russell, English musician (b. 1954)
  - Malcolm Slater, Scottish footballer (Southend United, Leyton Orient) (b. 1939)
  - Peter Swan, English footballer (England, Sheffield Wednesday, Bury) (b. 1936)
- 21 January –
  - Dave Bolton, English rugby league player (b. 1937)
  - Anthony Dawes, English character actor (b. 1928)
  - Keith Nichols, English jazz musician (b. 1945)
  - Mick Norcross, English businessman and reality television star (b. 1963)
  - Ian Wilson, British cinematographer (b. 1939)
- 22 January –
  - Hughroy Currie, Jamaican-English boxer (b. 1959)
  - Nick Drake-Lee, English rugby union player (b. 1942)
  - Johnny Williams, English footballer (Watford, Colchester United) (b. 1947)
- 23 January –
  - Sylvanus Blackman, Barbadian-English Olympic weightlifter (b. 1933)
  - Peter Gillott, English footballer (Barnsley) (b. 1935)
  - Sir Peter Harper, English geneticist (b. 1939)
  - Robert Rowland, English politician (b. 1966)
- 24 January –
  - Bobby McKee, Northern Irish politician (b. 1941)
  - Barrie Mitchell, Scottish footballer (Tranmere Rovers, Preston North End, York City) (b. 1947)
  - Ron Rafferty, English footballer (Portsmouth, Grimsby Town, Hull City, Aldershot) (b. 1934)
  - David Washbrook, English historian (b. 1948)
- 26 January –
  - Alan Ashcroft, English rugby union player (b. 1930)
  - John Mortimore, English footballer (Chelsea, Queens Park Rangers) and manager (Portsmouth) (b. 1934)
- 27 January –
  - Freddy, world's tallest dog (b. 2012)
  - Godfrey Hodgson, English journalist and historian (b. 1934)
- 28 January –
  - Eddie Connachan, Scottish football goalkeeper (Scotland, Middlesbrough) (b. 1935)
  - John Grant, Scottish professional footballer (b. 1931)
  - Lewis Wolpert, English developmental biologist (b. 1929)
- 29 January –
  - Jeremy Lubbock, English Grammy-winning musician (b. 1931)
  - Hilton Valentine, English rock musician (b. 1943)
- 30 January –
  - Jay Blumler, American-English academic (b. 1924)
  - Mick Kerr, Northern Irish Gaelic football player (b. 1934)
  - Sophie, Scottish singer-songwriter and record producer (b. 1986)
- 31 January –
  - John Gibbons, English footballer (b. 1925)
  - David Rose, Scottish rugby union player (b. 1931)

=== February ===
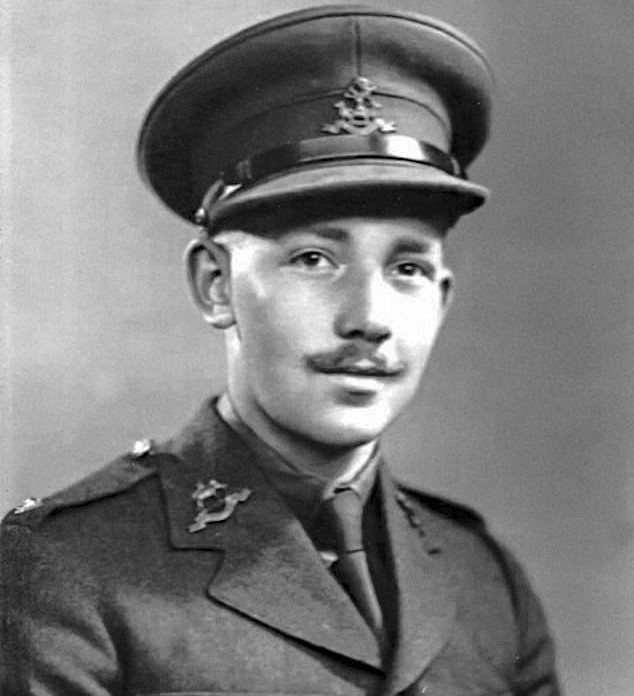
Captain Sir Tom Moore

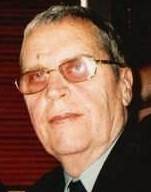
Harry Fielder

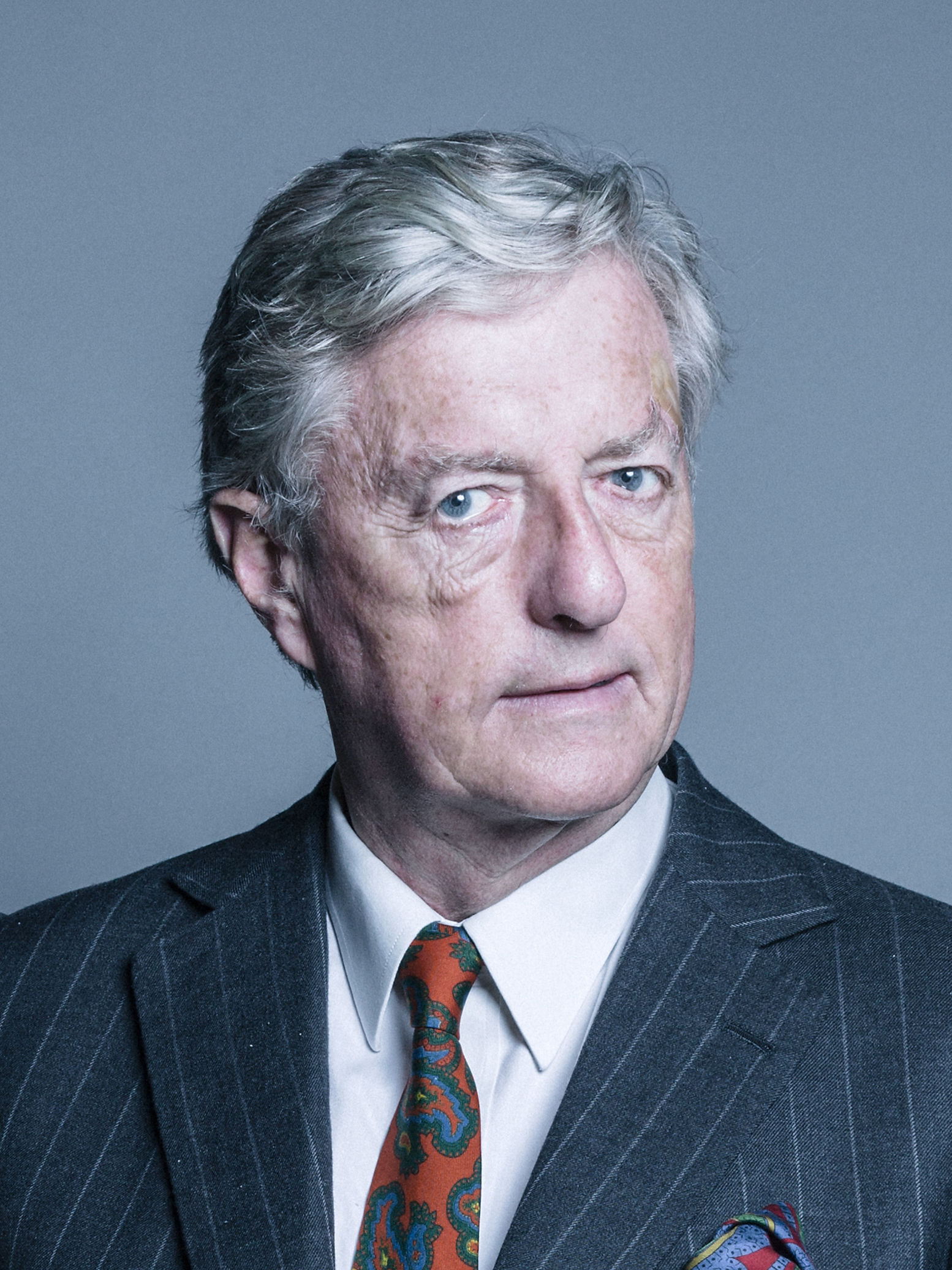
Andrew Fraser, Baron Fraser of Corriegarth in 2018

- 1 February –
  - Merryl Wyn Davies, Welsh academic (b. 1949)
  - Peter Hindley, English footballer (b. 1944)
- 2 February –
  - Naim Attallah, Palestinian-English businessman and writer (b. 1931)
  - Peter Dunn, English paediatrician (b. 1929)
  - Maureen Colquhoun, English politician; first openly lesbian British MP (b. 1928)
  - Jeremy Mallinson, English conservationist, zookeeper and author (b. 1937)
  - Captain Sir Tom Moore, English military officer and charity campaigner (b. 1920)
- 3 February – James Fenton, Northern Irish poet (b. 1931)
- 4 February – Samuel Vestey, 3rd Baron Vestey, English peer and landowner (b. 1941)
- 5 February –
  - Robert Armstrong, English racehorse trainer (b. 1944)
  - Jean Bayless, English actress (b. 1932)
  - John Pullin, English rugby union player (b. 1941)
  - Ernie Tate, Northern Irish activist and author (b. 1934)
- 6 February –
  - Harry Fielder, English actor (b. 1940)
  - Andrew Fraser, Baron Fraser of Corriegarth, Scottish politician and peer (b. 1946)
  - Alan Lerwill, English Olympic long jumper (b. 1946)
  - Columb McKinley, Scottish footballer (b. 1950)
  - Ken Roberts, Welsh footballer (b. 1936)
- 8 February –
  - Tony Collins, English footballer (b. 1926)
  - Graham Day, English footballer (b. 1953)
  - David Egerton, English rugby union player (b. 1961)
  - Cyril Mango, English scholar (b. 1928)
  - Vera Wülfing-Leckie, German-English homeopath and translator (b. 1954)
- 10 February – Dai Davies, Welsh footballer (b. 1948)
- 11 February –
  - John James, English footballer (b. 1948)
  - John Kirkham, English footballer (b. 1941)
- 12 February
  - Norman Jukes, English footballer (b. 1932)
  - Alan Woan, English footballer (b. 1931)
- 13 February – Sydney Devine, Scottish singer (b. 1940)
- 15 February – Steuart Bedford, English orchestral and opera conductor and pianist (b. 1939)
- 17 February –
  - Christopher Lee, British writer, historian and broadcaster (b. 1941)
  - John Manning, English footballer (b. 1940)
- 22 February – Jack Bolton, Scottish footballer (b. 1941)
- 24 February – Ronald Pickup, English actor (b. 1940)
- 28 February –
  - Johnny Briggs, English actor (b. 1935)
  - Glenn Roeder, English football manager and player (b. 1955)

=== March ===
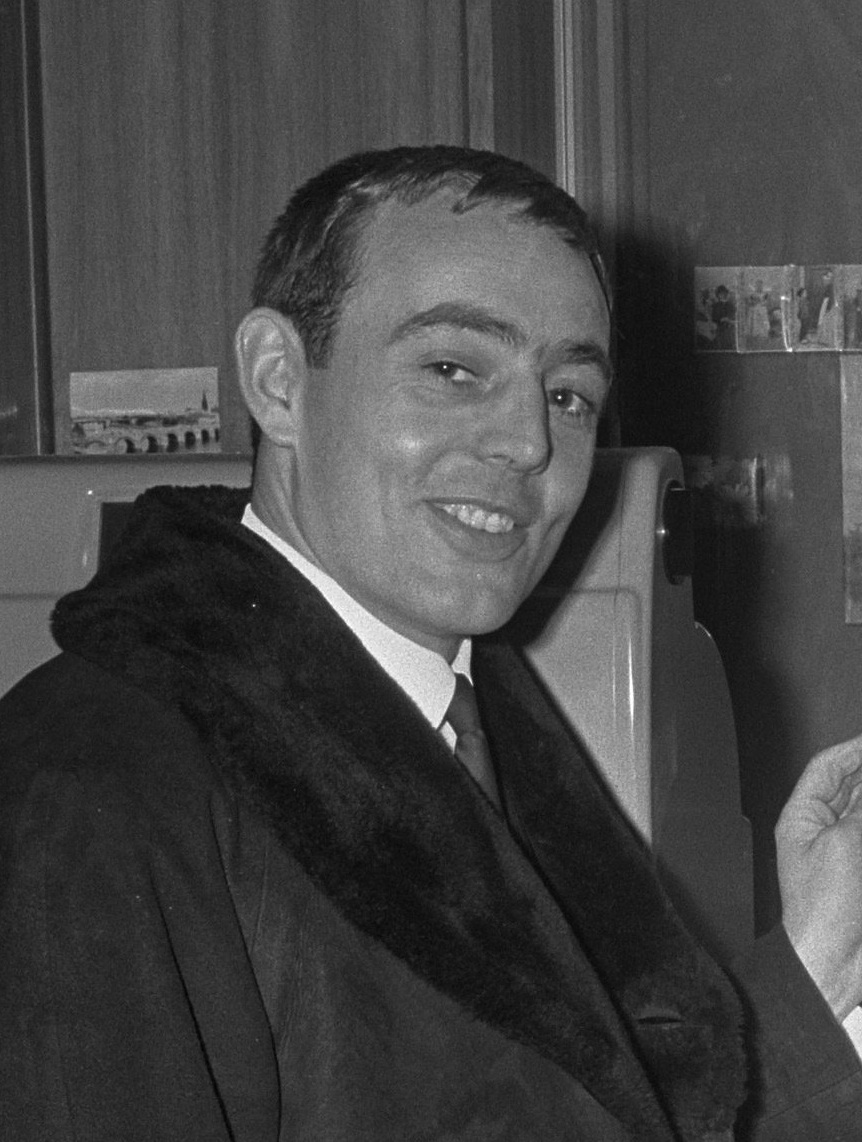
Ian St John in 1966

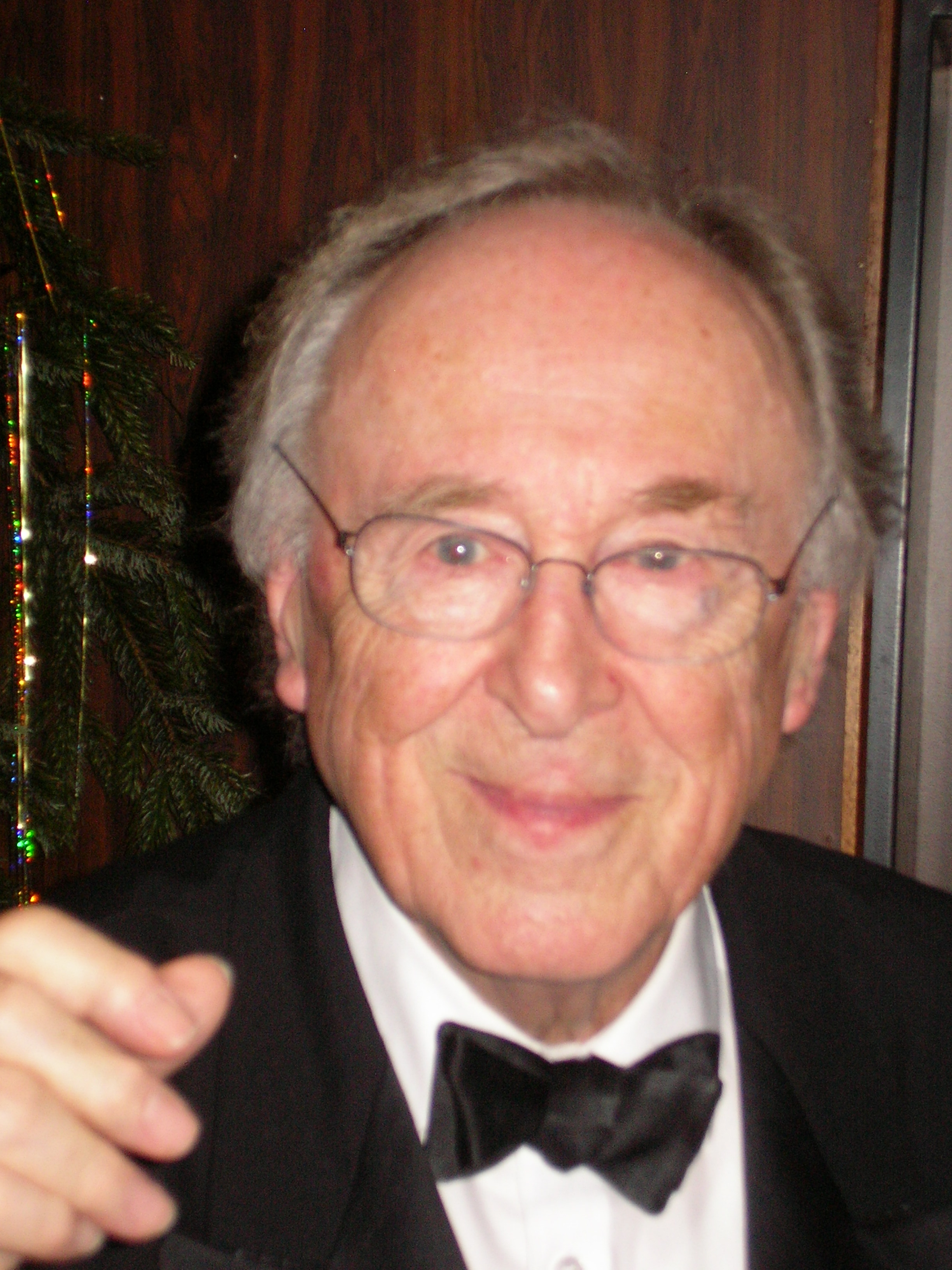
Chris Barber in 2010

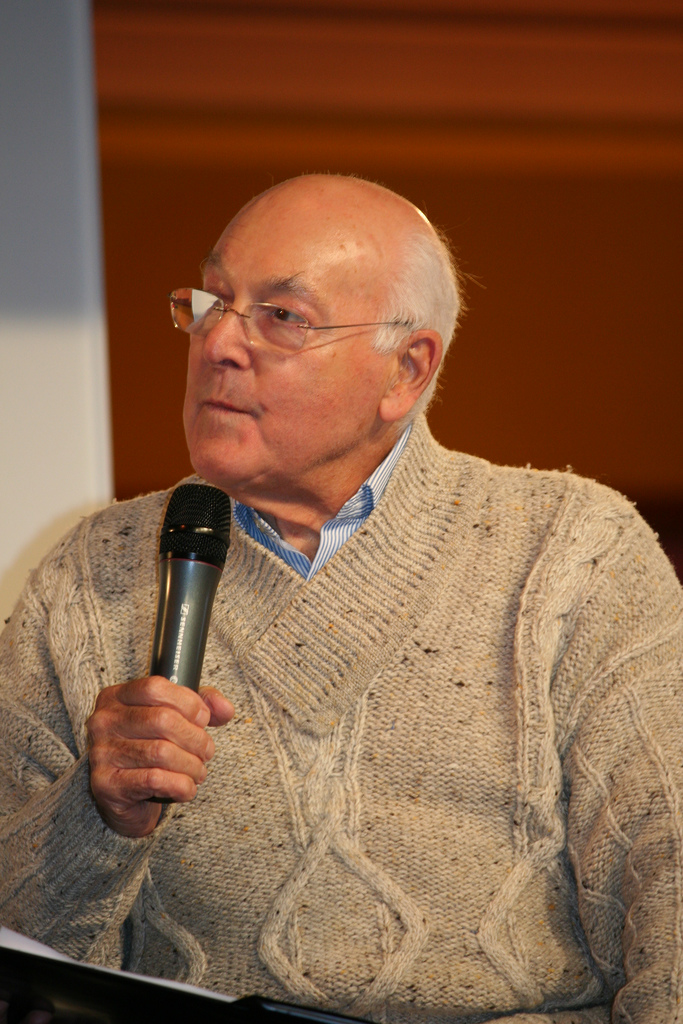
Murray Walker in 2009

- 1 March – Ian St John, Scottish footballer, coach and broadcaster (played for: Motherwell, Liverpool, Hellenic, Coventry City, Tranmere Rovers; managed: Motherwell and Portsmouth) (b. 1938)
- 2 March – Chris Barber, English jazz musician (b. 1930)
- 3 March – Nicola Pagett, British actress (b. 1945)
- 4 March
  - Phil Chisnall, English footballer (b. 1942)
  - Willie Whigham, Scottish footballer (b. 1939)
- 5 March – Mickey Lewis, English footballer (b. 1965)
- 8 March – Trevor Peacock, English actor, screenwriter and songwriter (b. 1931)
- 9 March
  - Micky Brown, English footballer (b. 1944)
  - Bob Graves, English footballer (b. 1942)
- 11 March
  - Ron Phoenix, English footballer (b. 1929)
  - Jimmy Stevenson, Scottish footballer (b. 1946)
- 13 March – Murray Walker, English motorsport commentator and journalist (b. 1923)
- 16 March – Sabine Schmitz, German motor racing driver (b. 1969)
- 17 March – Steve Jagielka, English footballer (b. 1978)
- 20 March
  - Robert Gard, British-born Australian operatic tenor (b. 1927)
  - Peter Lorimer, Scottish footballer (b. 1946)
- 21 March – Terry Melling, English footballer (b. 1940)
- 22 March
  - John Crichton-Stuart, 7th Marquess of Bute, Scottish peer and racing driver (b. 1958)
  - Alan Slough, English footballer (b. 1947)
  - Frank Worthington, English footballer (b. 1948)
- 24 March – Derek Hawksworth, footballer (b. 1927)
- 27 March – Derek Ufton, English cricketer, footballer and football manager (b. 1928)
- 31 March
  - Lee Collins, English footballer (b. 1988)
  - Jane Manning, soprano (b. 1938)

=== April ===
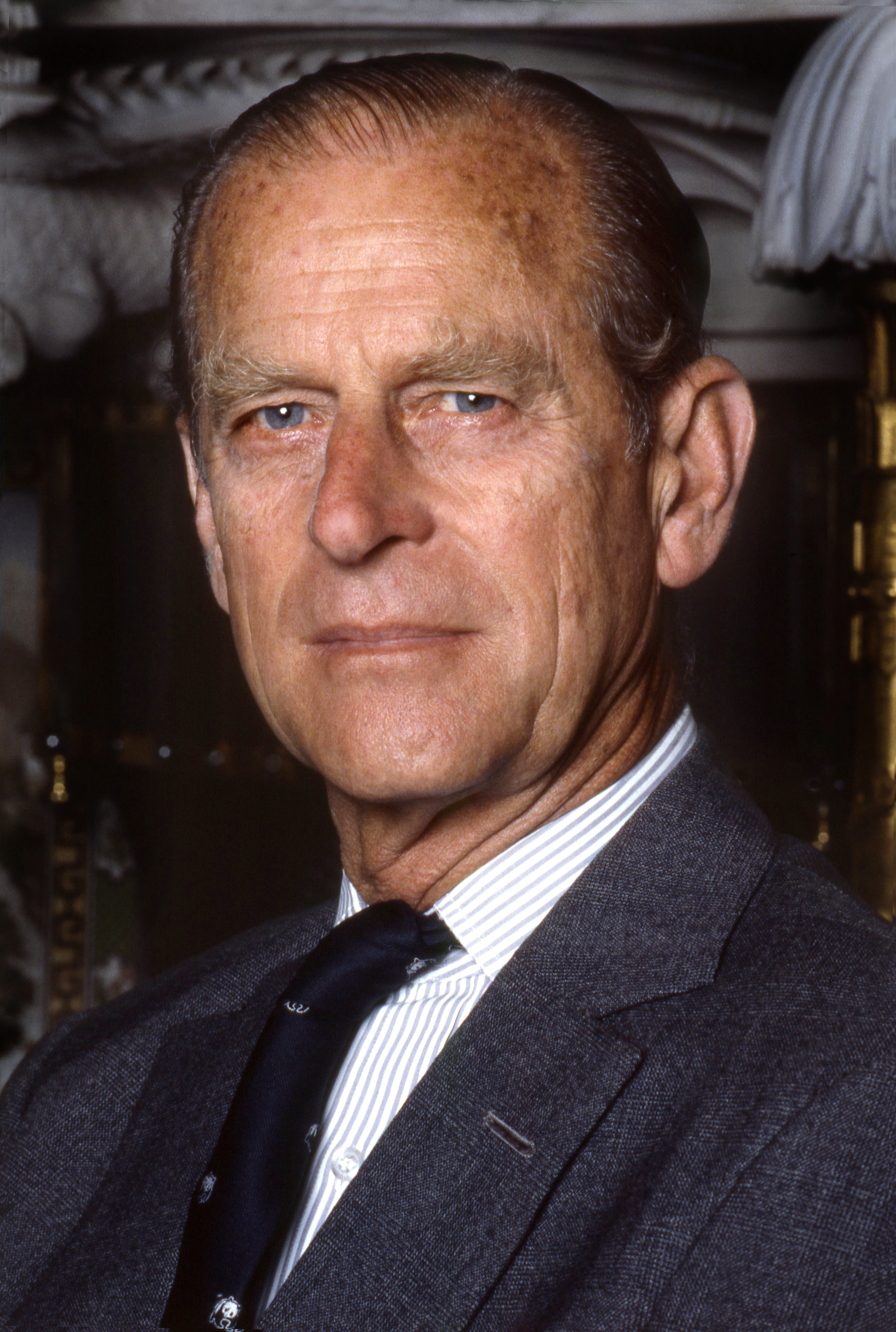
Prince Philip, Duke of Edinburgh

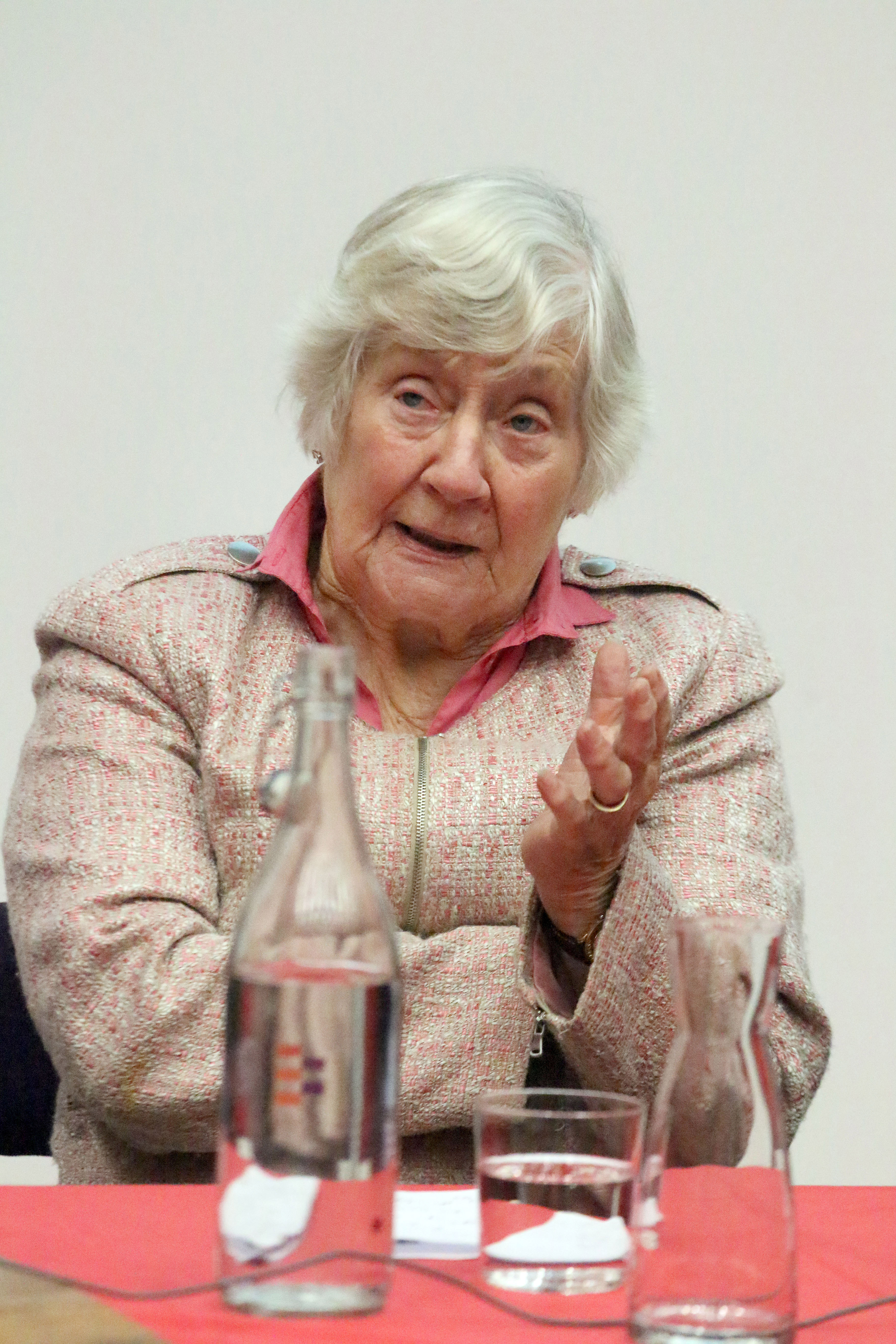
Shirley Williams in 2014

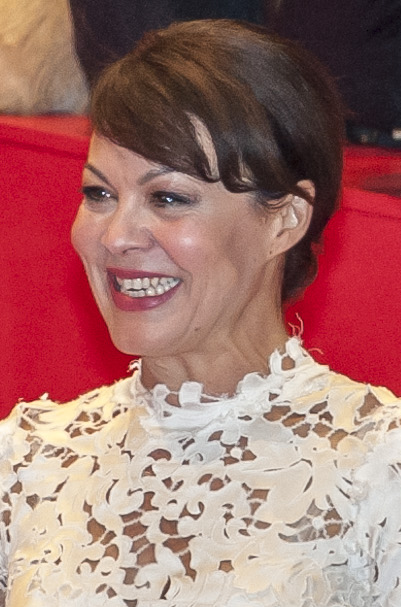
Helen McCrory in 2015

- 2 April – Simon Bainbridge, composer (b. 1952).
- 4 April – Dame Cheryl Gillan, politician, MP (since 1992), Secretary of State for Wales (2010–2012) (b. 1952).
- 5 April – Paul Ritter, actor (Friday Night Dinner, Chernobyl) (b. 1966)
- 6 April – Peter Ainsworth, politician, MP (1992–2010) (b. 1956)
- 7 April
  - Doug Holden, English professional footballer (b. 1930)
  - Sir Richard Sutton, 9th Baronet, businessman who appeared in The Sunday Times Rich List (b. 1937)
- 9 April
  - Ian Gibson, politician, MP (1997–2009) (b. 1938)
  - Prince Philip, Duke of Edinburgh, consort of the British monarch (since 1952) (b. 1921).
  - Nikki Grahame, English television personality (Big Brother, Princess Nikki, Big Brother Canada), anorexia nervosa (b. 1982).
- 11 April – Colin Baker, Welsh professional footballer (b. 1934)
- 12 April
  - Peter Goy, English professional footballer (b. 1938)
  - Shirley Williams, politician, MP (1964–1979, 1981–1983), Secretary of State for Education and Paymaster General (1976–1979) (b. 1930)
- 13 April – R. W. Davies, historian and writer (b. 1925)
- 16 April
  - John Dawes, Welsh rugby union player (Barbarian, Wales national team, British Lions) (b. 1940).
  - Terry Gunn, English cricketer (Sussex) (b. 1935).
  - Helen McCrory, English actress (Peaky Blinders, Harry Potter, The Queen), cancer (b. 1968).
  - Liam Scarlett, choreographer (The Royal Ballet) (b. 1986).
- 17 April
  - Frank Judd, Baron Judd, politician, MP (1966–1979) (b. 1935).
  - Wayne Talkes, English professional footballer (b. 1952)
- 20 April – Les McKeown, Scottish singer (Bay City Rollers) (b. 1955).
- 22 April – Anthony Thwaite, poet and critic (b. 1930)
- 23 April – Detta O'Cathain, Baroness O'Cathain (b. 1938)
- 24 April
  - Walter Borthwick, Scottish football player and coach (b. 1948)
  - Trevor Smith, Baron Smith of Clifton, politician and life peer (b. 1937)
- 25 April – John Diamond, physician and author (b. 1934)
- 26 April
  - Peter Gelson, English professional footballer (b. 1941)
  - Ian Hamilton, professional footballer (b. 1940)
- 28 April – Steve Perks, English professional footballer (b. 1963)
- 29 April
  - Frank Brogan, Scottish professional footballer (b. 1942)
  - Zhang Enhua, Chinese professional football player and coach (b. 1973)
- 30 April – Anthony Payne, English composer, music critic and writer (b. 1936)

=== May ===
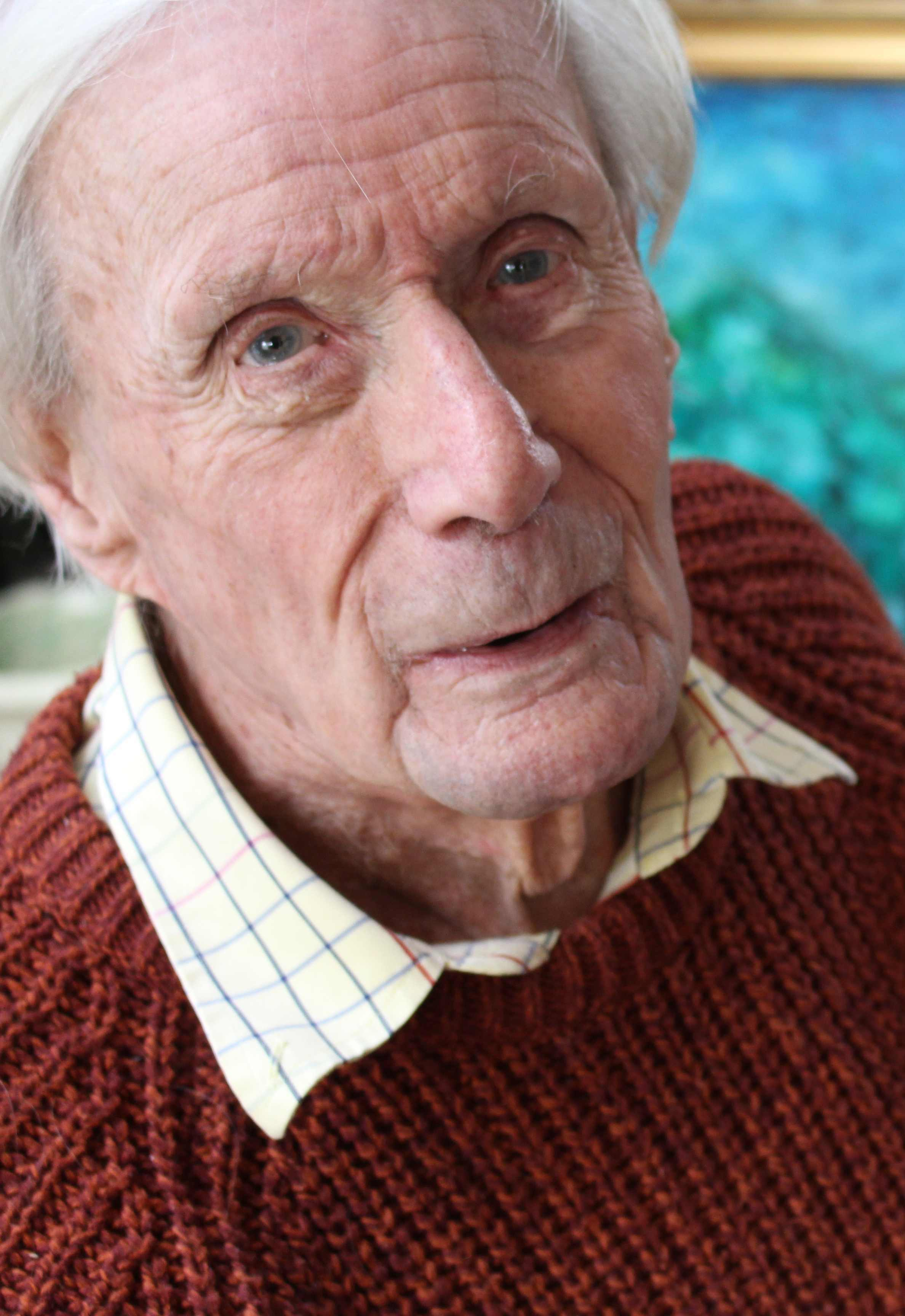
Sir Leslie Marr in 2019

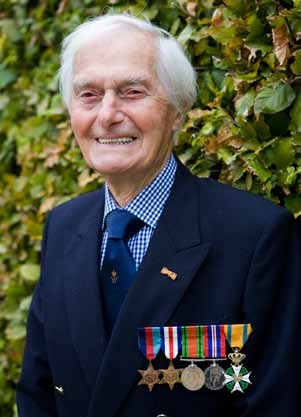
Kenneth Mayhew in 2011

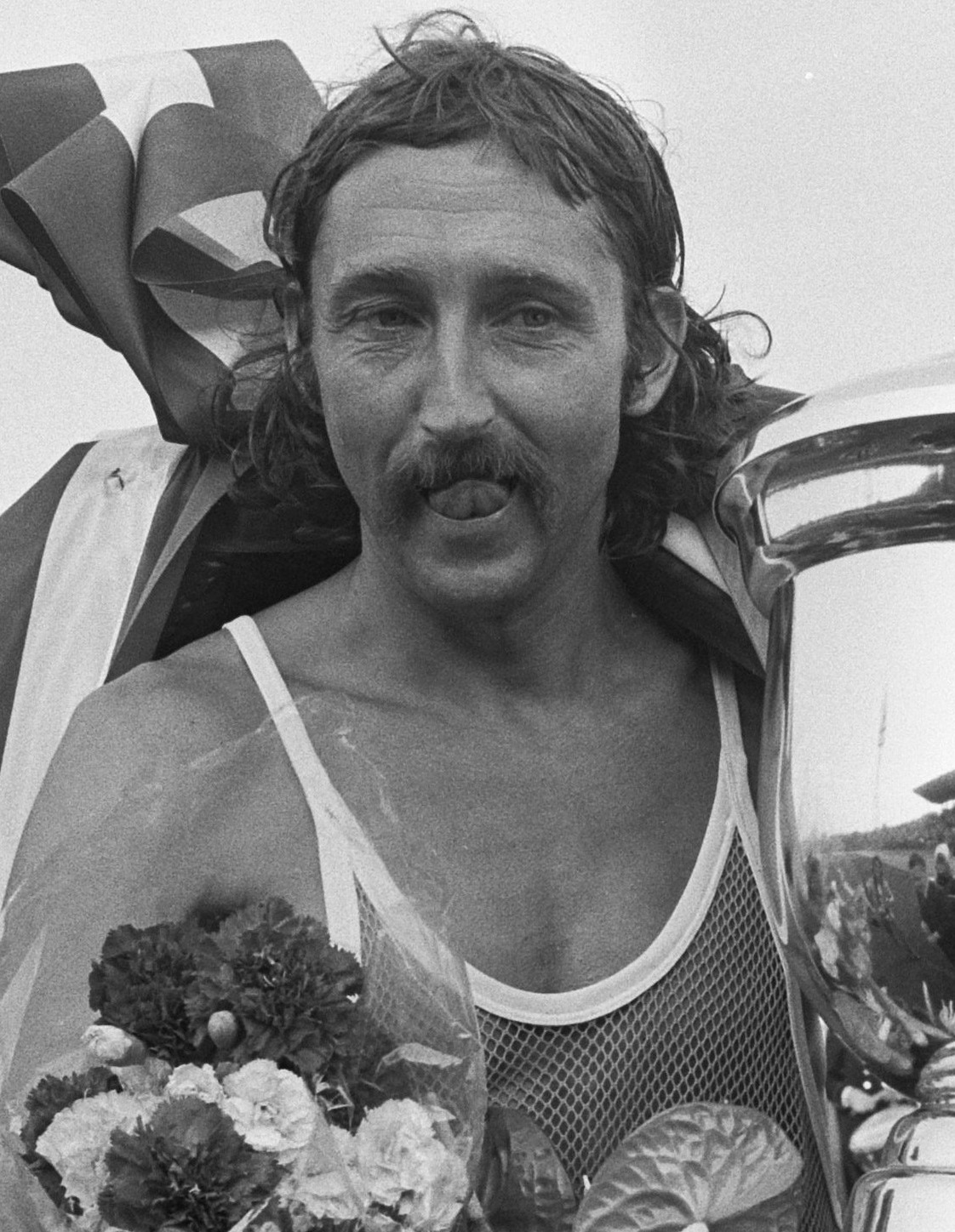
Ron Hill in 1975

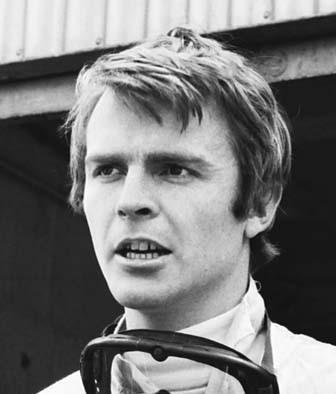
Max Mosley in 1969

- 1 May – Stuart Woolf, English-Italian historian (b. 1936)
- 3 May – Cliff Slaughter, political activist (b. 1928)
- 4 May
  - Steve Conroy, English footballer (b. 1956)
  - Nick Kamen, English male model, songwriter, and musician, bone marrow cancer (b. 1962)
  - Sir Leslie Marr, 4th Baronet, artist and racing driver (b. 1922)
  - Alan McLoughlin, English-born Irish professional footballer and coach, cancer (b. 1967)
- 5 May – Ray Teret, disc jockey and convicted rapist (b. 1941)
- 7 May
  - John Kay, journalist (The Sun), fall (b. 1943)
  - John Sludden, Scottish footballer and manager (b. 1964)
- 8 May – Robert Walpole, 10th Baron Walpole, English peer (b. 1938)
- 9 May
  - Neil Connery, Scottish film actor (O.K. Connery) (b. 1938)
  - James Dean, English footballer (b. 1985) (body discovered on this date)
  - Alec Graham, English Anglican bishop (b. 1929)
- 10 May
  - Kevin Jackson, writer, broadcaster and filmmaker (b. 1955)
  - Pauline Tinsley, English opera singer (b. 1928)
- 12 May
  - Seamus Deane, Northern Irish poet and author (Reading in the Dark) (b. 1940)
  - Nick Downie, journalist and soldier, COVID-19 (b. 1946)
- 13 May – Major Kenneth Mayhew, Army officer, Second World War veteran and Military William Order recipient (b. 1917)
- 15 May
  - Fred Dellar, music journalist (b. 1931)
  - Oliver Gillie, journalist and scientist, lymphocytic leukemia (b. 1937)
  - George Little, Scottish-Canadian politician (b. 1937)
  - Emily Mair, Scottish-New Zealand opera singer, pianist and vocal coach (b. 1928)
  - Roy Scammell, stuntman and actor (Alien, Willow, Flash Gordon) (b. 1932)
- 17 May – Joe Mercer, English jockey (b. 1934)
- 20 May
  - Len Badger, English footballer (b. 1945)
  - Chris Chilton, English professional footballer (b. 1943)
  - Ken Garland, graphic designer (b. 1929)
  - Freddy Marks, English television actor and musician (Rod, Jane and Freddy) (b. 1949).
  - Eric Winstanley, English professional footballer (b. 1944)
- 21 May – Lisa Shaw, radio presenter and journalist (BBC Radio Newcastle, Metro Radio, Heart North East) (b. 1976/77)
- 23 May
  - Ron Hill, Olympic marathon runner (1964, 1972) (b. 1938)
  - Max Mosley, racing driver, lawyer and President of the FIA (1993–2009) (b. 1940)
- 25 May – Sir Roger Gifford, banker, Lord Mayor of London (2012–2013) (b. 1955)
- 26 May – Shane Briant, actor (Hammer Films) (b. 1946)
- 31 May – Colin Appleton, English footballer and manager (b. 1936)

=== June ===
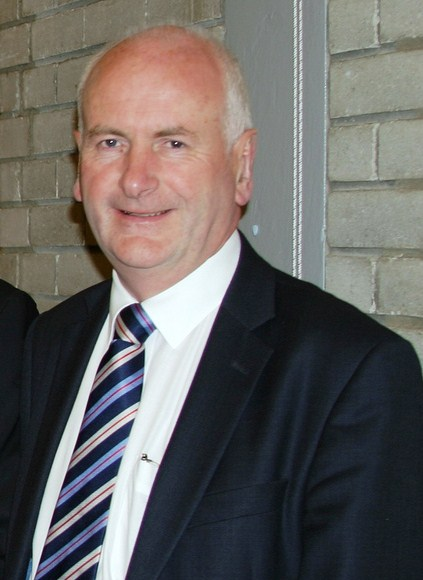
Gordon Dunne

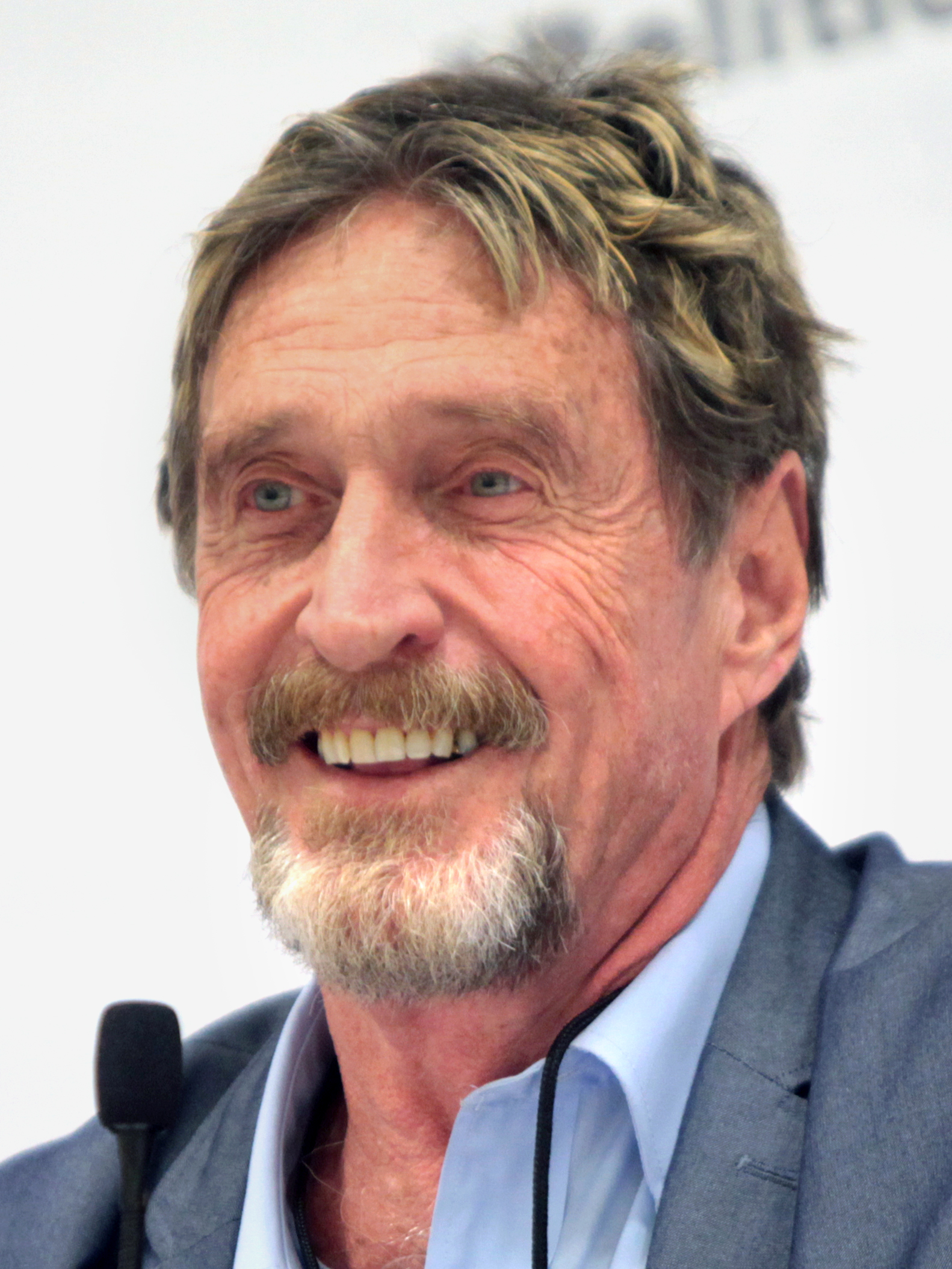
John McAfee in 2016

- 3 June
  - Damaris Hayman, English actress (b. 1929).
  - Alan Miller, English professional footballer (b. 1970).
- 6 June – Paul Cahill, English association football defender (b. 1955).
- 7 June – Ben Roberts, Welsh actor (The Bill) (b. 1950).
- 8 June
  - John Angus, English footballer (b. 1938).
  - Karen MacLeod, long-distance runner (b. 1958).
- 9 June – Kirkland Laing, Jamaican-born boxer, European welterweight champion (1990), British welterweight champion (1979–1980, 1987–1991) (b. 1954).
- 10 June
  - Elizabeth French, archaeologist (b. 1931).
  - Sir Dai Rees, biochemist, chief executive of the Medical Research Council (1987–1996) (b. 1936).
- 11 June – Lucinda Riley, Northern Irish author and actress (Auf Wiedersehen, Pet), oesophageal cancer (b. 1965).
- 12 June – Jack Adams, English rugby union player, cancer (b. 1986).
- 13 June – Sir John Kemball, air marshal, Deputy Commander of RAF Strike Command (1989–1993) (b. 1939).
- 16 June – Edward Baldwin, 4th Earl Baldwin of Bewdley, English peer (b. 1938)
- 18 June
  - Edward Mortimer, civil servant, journalist and academic, cancer (b. 1943).
  - Andrew Welsh, Scottish politician, MP (1974–1979, 1987–2001), MSP (1999–2011) (b. 1944).
- 19 June – Spencer Whelan, English footballer (b. 1971).
- 20 June – Gordon Dunne, politician, MLA (2011–2021) (b. 1959).
- 22 June – Hugh Lowther, 8th Earl of Lonsdale, aristocrat (b. 1949).
- 23 June
  - Jackie Lane, English actress (Doctor Who, Compact) (b. 1941).
  - Brian London, English heavyweight boxer, British and Commonwealth champion (1958–1959) (b. 1934).
  - John McAfee, British-American computer programmer and businessman (McAfee Associates), suicide (b. 1945).
  - Clare Peploe, Italian-born film director (High Season, Triumph of Love) and screenwriter (Zabriskie Point) (b. 1942).
  - Peter Zinovieff, engineer (EMS VCS 3) and composer (b. 1933).
- 24 June – Dick Leonard, journalist and politician, MP (1970–1974) (b. 1930).
- 25 June
  - Brian Bamford, English professional golfer (b. 1935).
  - Peter Willis, journalist and newspaper editor (Sunday Mirror, The Sunday People).
- 26 June – David Yale, legal historian (b. 1928).
- 28 June – Menelik Shabazz, Barbadian-born film director (Burning an Illusion), producer and educator, complications from diabetes (b. 1954).
- 29 June – Jane, Lady Roberts, librarian and curator, royal librarian (2002–2013) (b. 1949).
- 30 June – Alain Viala, English literary scientist (b. 1947).

=== July ===
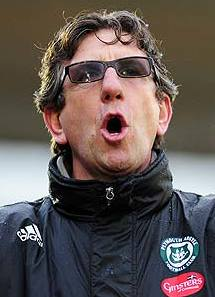
Paul Mariner in 2010

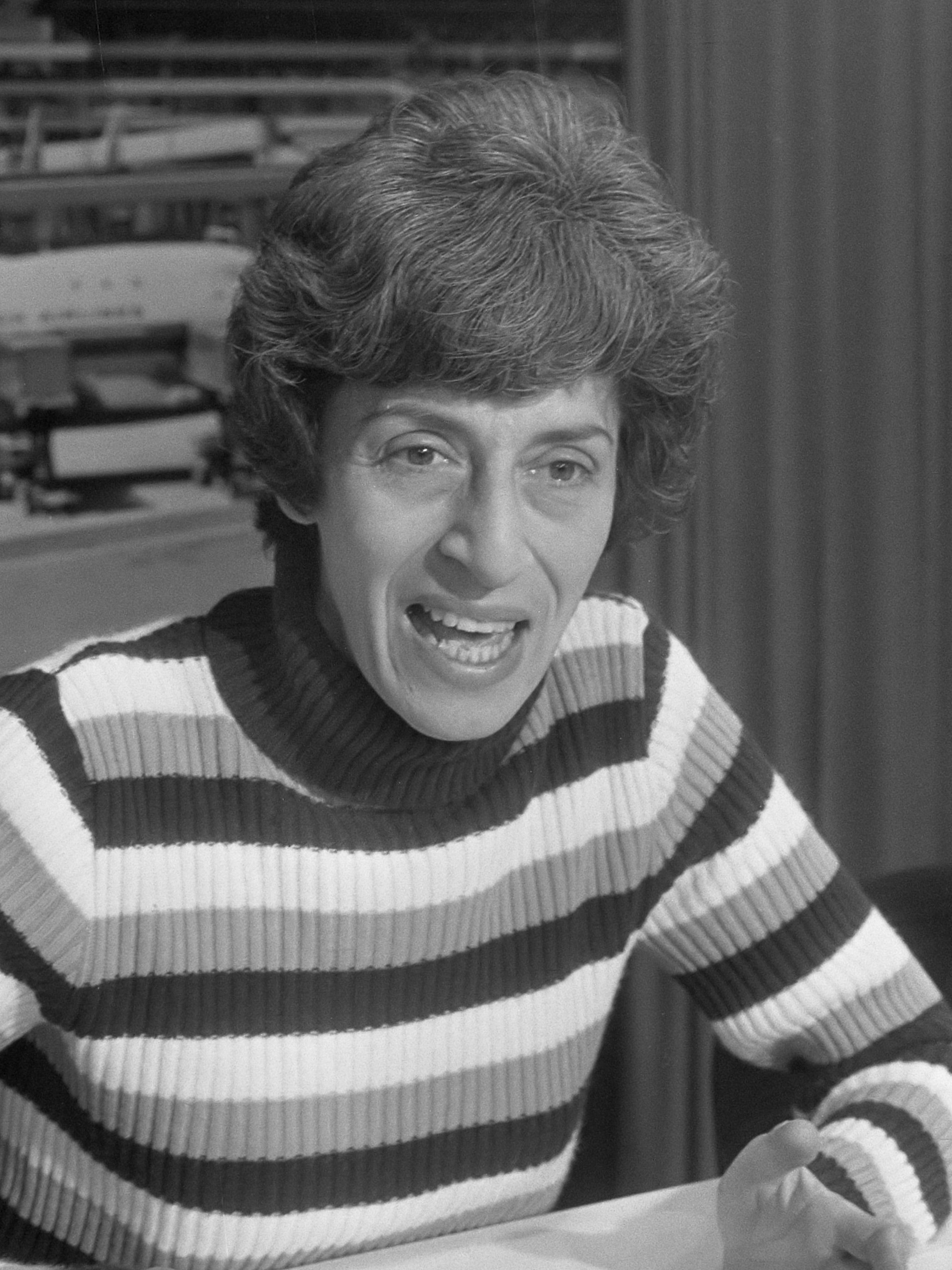
Carmel Budiardjo in 1973

- 2 July – Eric Eldin, jockey (b. 1932).
- 3 July – Anne Stallybrass, English actress (The Six Wives of Henry VIII, Heartbeat, Diana: Her True Story) (b. 1938).
- 5 July
  - Fay Allen, Jamaican-born police officer, first black female police officer in the United Kingdom (b. 1939).
  - Gillian Sheen, fencer, Olympic champion (1956) (b. 1928).
- 6 July – Sir Nicholas Goodison, businessman, chairman of the London Stock Exchange (1976–1986) (b. 1934).
- 7 July
  - Michael Horovitz, poet (b. 1935).
  - Elystan Morgan, Baron Elystan-Morgan, Welsh politician, MP (1966–1974) and member of the House of Lords (1981–2020) (b. 1932).
- 8 July
  - Adrian Metcalfe, athlete, Olympic silver medalist (1964) (b. 1942).
  - Max Griggs, English footwear and football executive, owner of Dr. Martens and Rushden & Diamonds F.C. (b. 1938).
- 9 July
  - Jonathan Coleman, English-born Australian radio and television presenter, prostate cancer (b. 1956).
  - Betty Gilderdale, English-born New Zealand children's author (b. 1923).
  - Joan Le Mesurier, English actress and writer (b. 1931).
  - Paul Mariner, English footballer (Plymouth Argyle, Ipswich Town, national team) and manager, brain cancer (b. 1953).
  - Emma Ritch, Scottish equality activist.
- 10 July
  - Carmel Budiardjo, English human rights activist, founder of Tapol, and author (b. 1925).
  - Jimmy Gabriel, Scottish footballer (Everton, Southampton, national team) and manager (b. 1940).
- 11 July
  - Dave Dunmore, English footballer (Leyton Orient, York City, Tottenham Hotspur) (b. 1934).
  - Charlie Gallagher, Scottish-Irish footballer (Celtic, Dumbarton, Ireland national team) (b. 1940).
  - Ernie Moss, English footballer (Chesterfield, Mansfield Town, Lincoln City) (b. 1949).
- 12 July – Mick Bates, English footballer (Leeds United, Walsall, Bradford City) (b. 1947).
- 15 July
  - Keith Bambridge, English footballer (Rotherham United, Darlington, Halifax Town) (b. 1935).
  - Andy Fordham, English darts player, world champion (2004), organ failure (b. 1962).
- 16 July
  - Simon Dring, journalist (Reuters, The Daily Telegraph, BBC News) and television presenter, heart attack (b. 1945).
  - Thomas Rajna, Hungarian-born pianist and composer (Seven Years in Tibet, Jet Storm) (b. 1928).
- 17 July
  - George Curtis, English association footballer (Coventry City, Aston Villa) and manager (b. 1939).
  - Sir Graham Vick, English opera director, COVID-19 (b. 1953).
- 18 July
  - Jeff Barmby, English footballer (York City) (b. 1943).
  - Lawrence Seymour Goodman, bomber pilot (No. 617 Squadron RAF) (b. 1920).
  - Tom O'Connor, English comedian and game show host (Crosswits, The Zodiac Game, Name That Tune), complications from Parkinson's disease (b. 1939).
  - John Woodcock, English cricket writer (b. 1926).
- 19 July – Simon Terry, archer, Olympic bronze medalist (1992), cancer (b. 1974).
- 20 July
  - Billy Reid, Scottish professional footballer (Motherwell, Airdrieonians) (b. 1938).
  - Peter Willis, English football referee (b. 1937).
- 21 July
  - Alexander McDonnell, 9th Earl of Antrim, Northern Irish peer (b. 1935).
  - Tommy Leishman, Scottish professional footballer (Liverpool, Stranraer, St Mirren) (b. 1937).
  - Mike Smith, English football manager (Hull City) (b. 1937).
- 22 July – Peter Rehberg, Austrian-English electronic musician (KTL), heart attack (b. 1968).
- 23 July – Andy Higgins, English footballer (Chesterfield, Port Vale, Hartlepool United, Rochdale, Chester City) (b. 1960).
- 24 July
  - Sue Pinnington, Anglican priest (b. 1966).
  - Alfie Scopp, English-born Canadian actor (Tales of the Wizard of Oz, Fiddler on the Roof, Rudolph the Red-Nosed Reindeer) (b. 1919).
- 26 July – Ally Dawson, Scottish professional football defender (Scotland, Blackburn Rovers) (b. 1958)
- 31 July – Terry Cooper, English footballer (Leeds United, national team) and manager (Bristol City) (b. 1944).

=== August ===
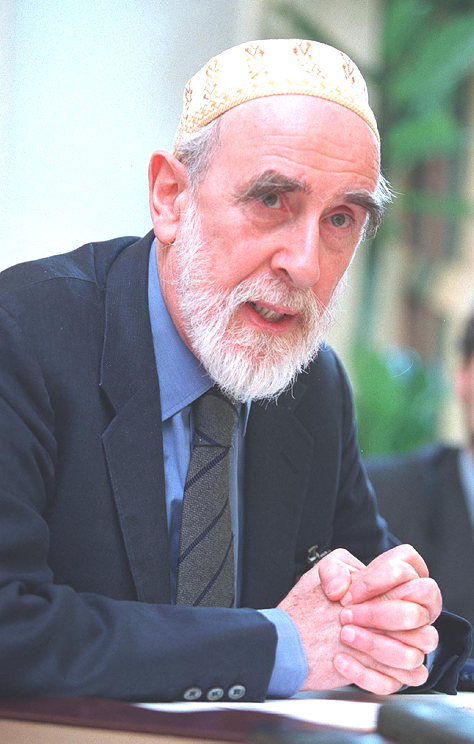
Abdalqadir as-Sufi in 2007

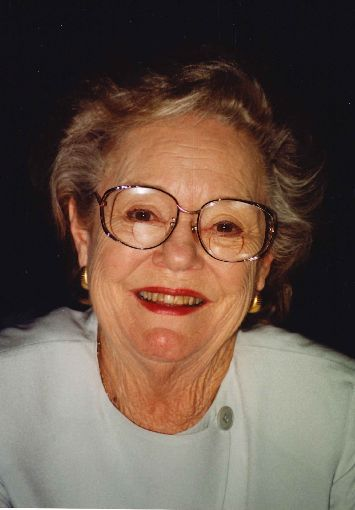
Pat Hitchcock in 1996

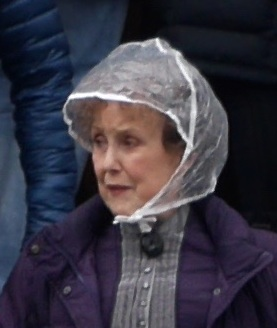
Una Stubbs in 2015

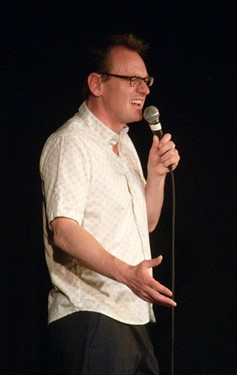
Sean Lock in 2008

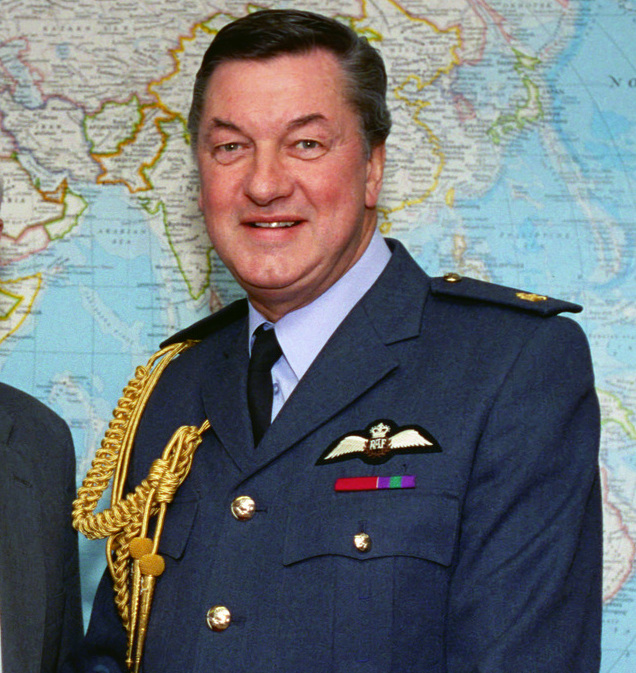
Sir Peter Harding in 1993

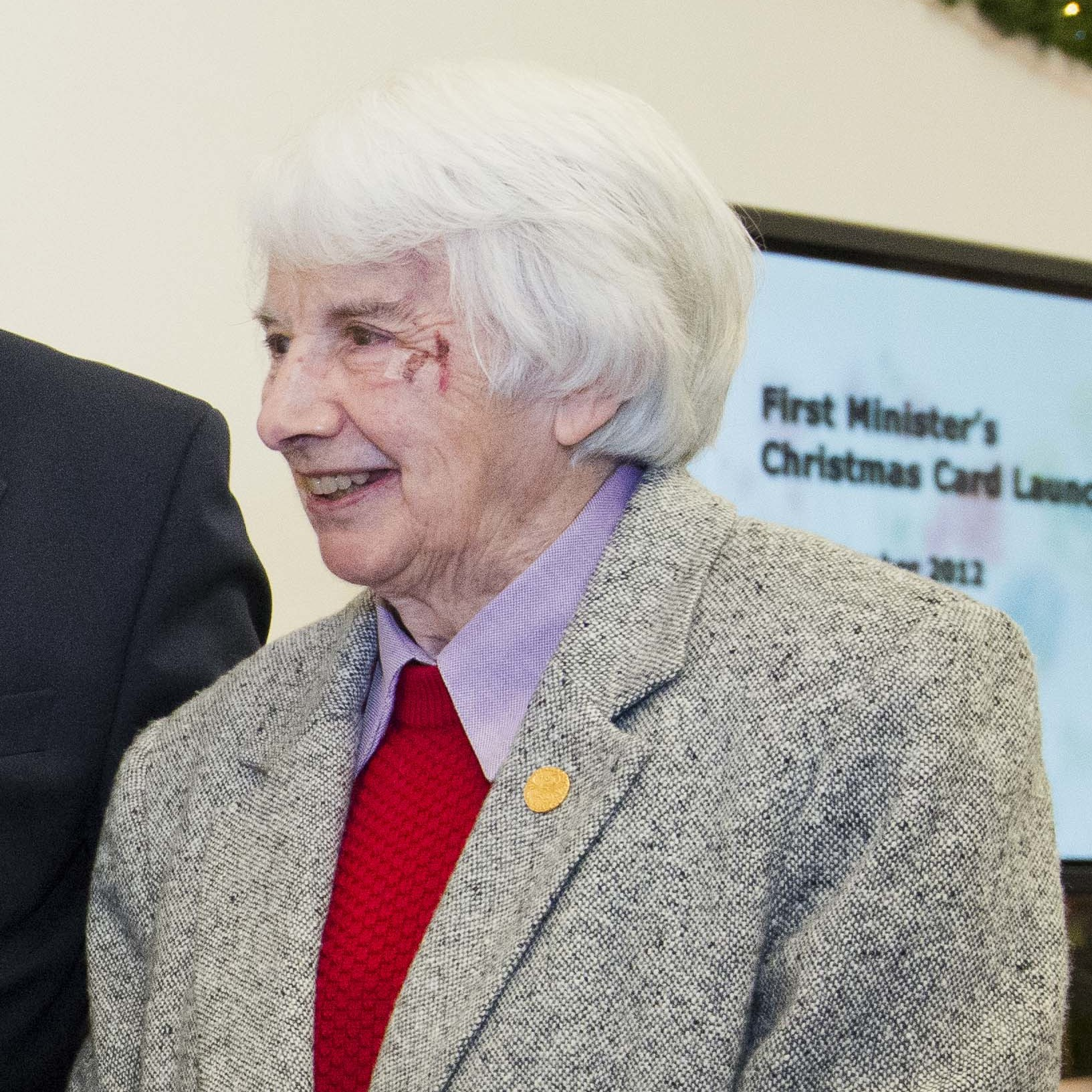
Dame Elizabeth Blackadder in 2012

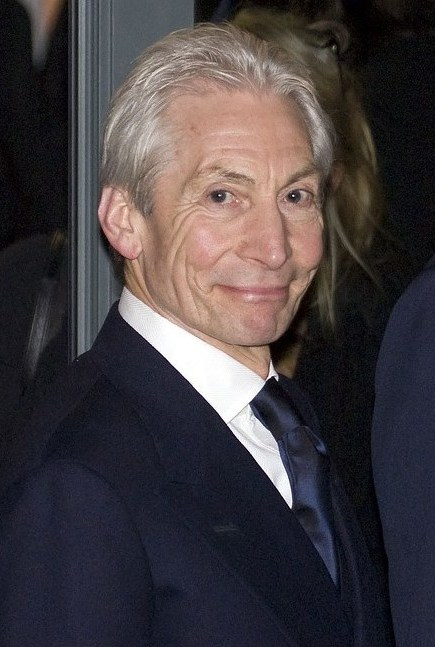
Charlie Watts in 2008

- 1 August
  - Abdalqadir as-Sufi, Scottish Islamic scholar, founder of the Murabitun World Movement (b. 1930).
  - Eddie Presland, English footballer (West Ham United, Crystal Palace) (b. 1943).
  - Ian Thomson, English cricketer (national team) (b. 1929).
- 2 August
  - Ged Dunn, English rugby league footballer (Hull Kingston Rovers, national team) (b. 1946).
  - Peter Smith, Baron Smith of Leigh, politician and life peer, member of the House of Lords (since 1999) (born 1945).
- 3 August
  - Sir John Enderby, physicist (b. 1931).
  - Allan Stephenson, English-born South African composer, cellist, and conductor (b. 1949).
- 5 August – Terry Davies, Welsh rugby union player (Swansea, British and Irish Lions, national team) (b. 1933).
- 6 August – Les Vandyke, English singer and songwriter ("What Do You Want?", "Poor Me", "Well I Ask You") (b. 1931).
- 7 August
  - Robbie Cooke, English footballer (Peterborough United, Cambridge United, Brentford) (b. 1957).
  - John Dickinson, English rugby league player (St Helens) (b. 1934).
  - Sir Patrick Forrest, Scottish surgeon (b. 1923).
- 8 August – Ken Clark, English-born Canadian gridiron football player (Hamilton Tiger-Cats, Saskatchewan Roughriders, Los Angeles Rams) (b. 1948).
- 9 August
  - Pat Hitchcock, English-born American actress (Stage Fright, Strangers on a Train, Psycho) (b. 1928).
  - Ken Hutchison, Scottish actor (Straw Dogs, All Quiet on the Western Front, Ladyhawke) (b. 1948).
- 10 August
  - Dilys Watling, English actress (Calculated Risk, Two Left Feet, Theatre of Death) (b. 1942).
  - Stephen Wilkinson, English choral conductor and composer (b. 1919).
- 11 August – Dick Huddart, English rugby league player (St. Helens, St. George, national team) (b. 1936).
- 12 August – Una Stubbs, English actress (Till Death Us Do Part, Worzel Gummidge, Sherlock) (b. 1937).
- 13 August
  - Angela Milner, paleontologist (b. 1947).
  - Bobby Stein, Scottish footballer (Raith Rovers, Montrose).
- 14 August – Hugh Wood, English composer (b. 1932).
- 15 August – Jan David Simon, 3rd Viscount Simon, hereditary peer, member of the House of Lords (since 1994) (b. 1940).
- 16 August
  - Douglas Ankrah, Ghanaian-born mixologist, inventor of the porn star martini.
  - Sean Lock, English comedian (15 Storeys High, 8 Out of 10 Cats, 8 Out of 10 Cats Does Countdown), cancer (b. 1963).
  - Maurice Watkins, sports administrator and solicitor (Manchester United) (b. 1941).
- 18 August
  - Gerry Jones, English footballer (Stoke City, Macclesfield Town, Stafford Rangers) (b. 1945).
  - Austin Mitchell, politician, MP (1977–2015) (b. 1934).
  - Jill Murphy, author (The Worst Witch), cancer (b. 1949).
- 19 August – Sir Peter Harding, Royal Air Force officer, chief of the Air Staff (1988–1992) and Defence Staff (1992–1994) (b. 1933).
- 20 August – Peter Ind, jazz double bassist and record producer (b. 1928).
- 21 August
  - Jarvis Astaire, boxing promoter and film producer (Agatha) (b. 1923).
  - Eddie Healey, businessman (b. 1938).
  - Arthur Smith, English footballer (Bury F.C., Leicester City) (b. 1915).
- 22 August
  - Sir Eric Ash, electrical engineer (b. 1928).
  - Brian Travers, saxophonist and songwriter (UB40), brain cancer (b. 1959).
  - Jane Wenham-Jones, writer and journalist (Woman's Weekly) (b. 1962).
- 23 August
  - Dame Elizabeth Blackadder, Scottish painter (b. 1931).
  - Olli Wisdom, musician (Specimen) (b. 1958).
- 24 August
  - Fritz McIntyre, English keyboardist (Simply Red) (b. 1958).
  - Charlie Watts, rock drummer (The Rolling Stones, Blues Incorporated) (b. 1941).
- 25 August
  - Gerry Ashmore, motor racing driver, cancer (b. 1936).
  - Ray Aspden, English professional footballer (Rochdale) (b. 1938).
  - Ted Dexter, English cricketer (Sussex, national team) (b. 1935).
  - Bobby Waddell, Scottish footballer (Blackpool, Bradford Park Avenue) (b. 1939).
- 26 August – Taffy Owen, Welsh speedway rider (b. 1935).
- 27 August
  - Noel Cringle, Manx politician, President of Tynwald (2000–2011) (b. 1937).
  - Peter McNamee, Scottish footballer (Peterborough United, Notts County) (b. 1935).
  - Johnny Williamson, English footballer (Manchester City, Blackburn Rovers) (b. 1929).
- 28 August – Sam Oji, English professional footballer (Birmingham City, Leyton Orient, Hereford United) (b. 1985).
- 31 August – Theresa Plummer-Andrews, British television producer (b. 1944).

=== September ===
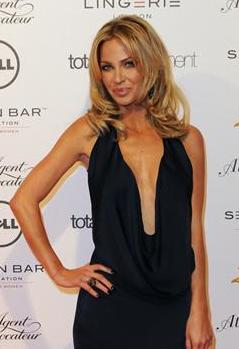
Sarah Harding in 2012

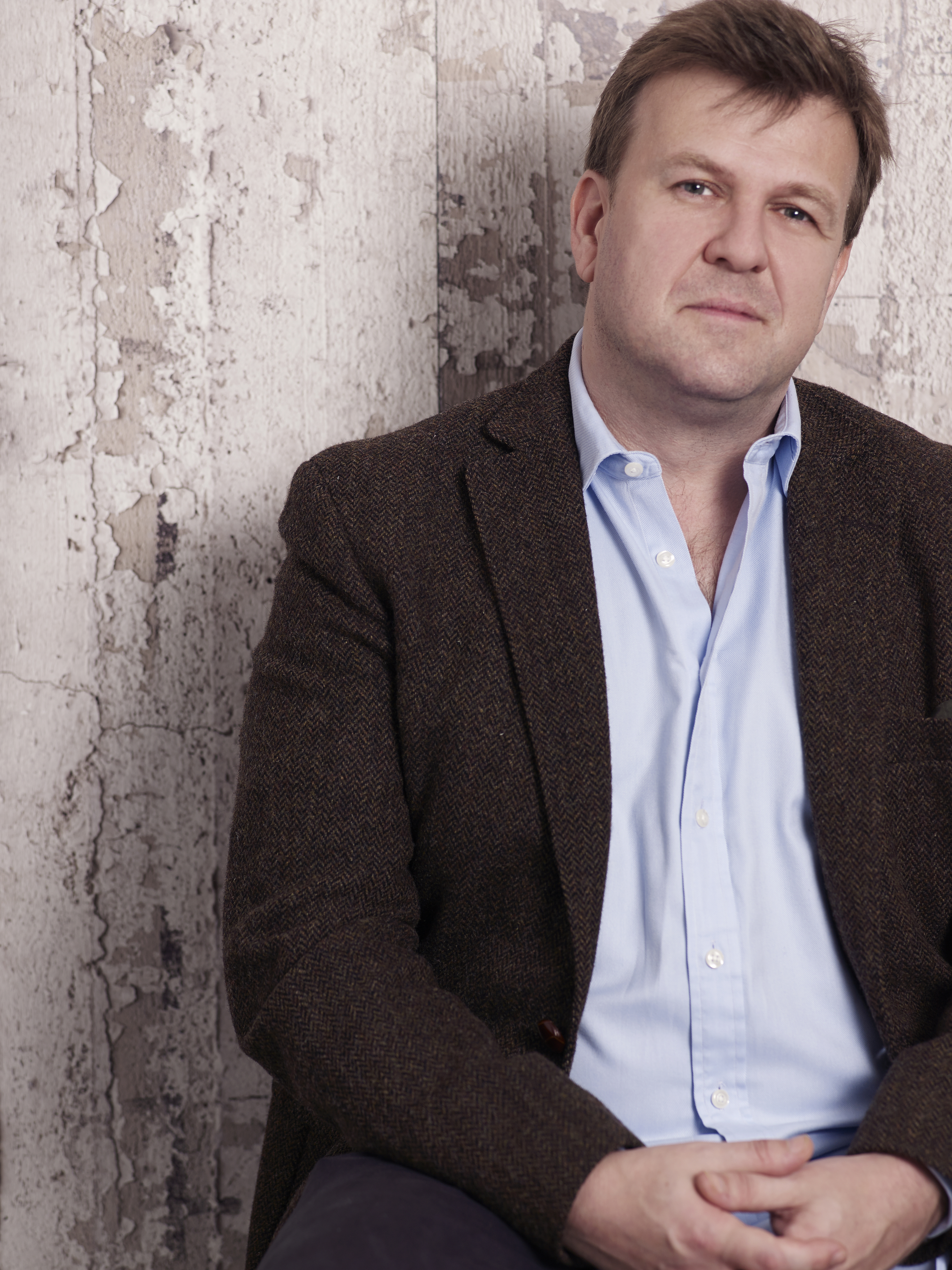
Matthew Strachan in 2016

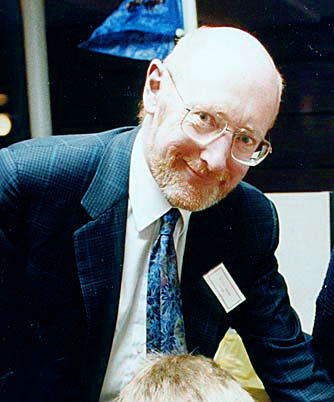
Sir Clive Sinclair in 1992

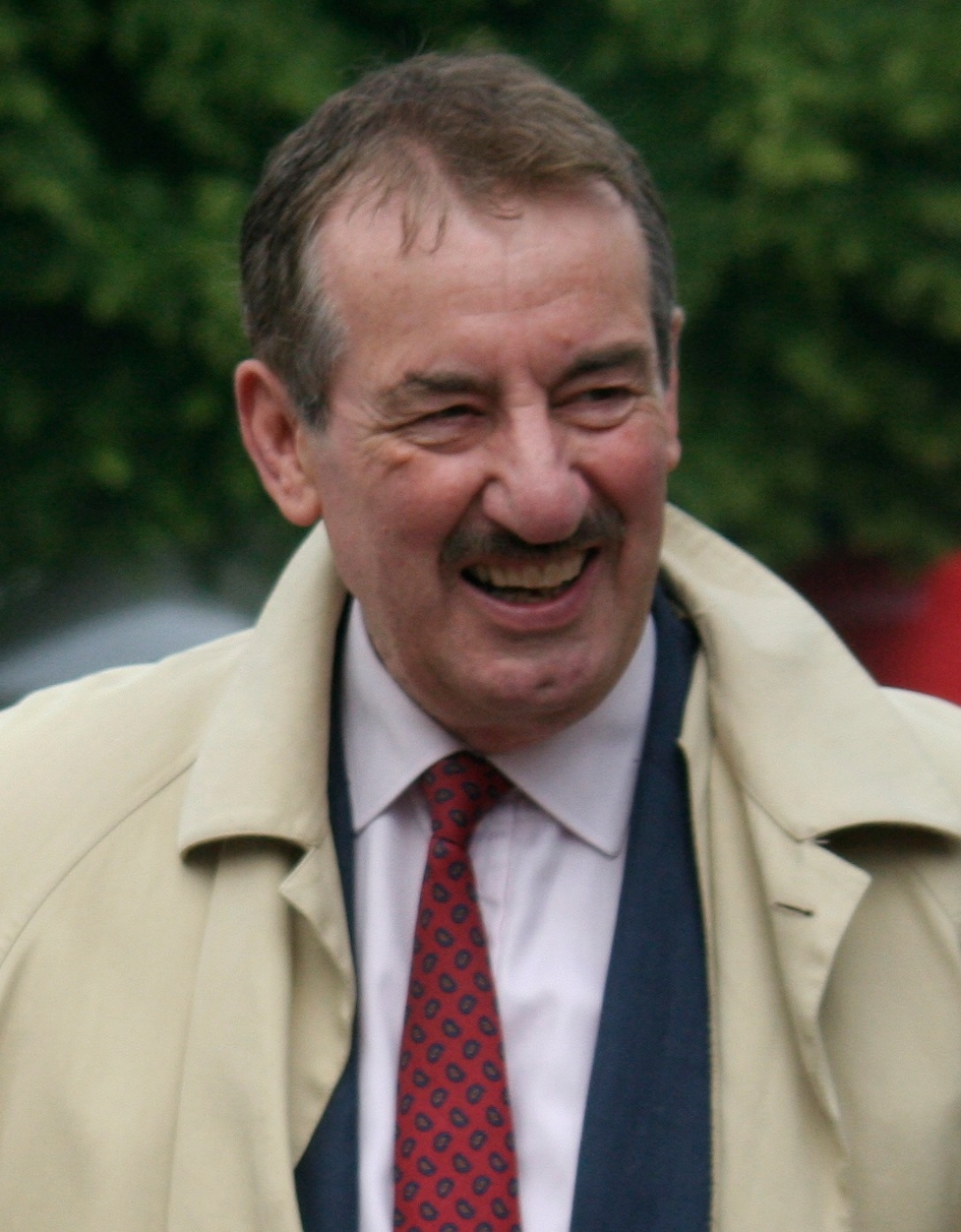
John Challis in 2013

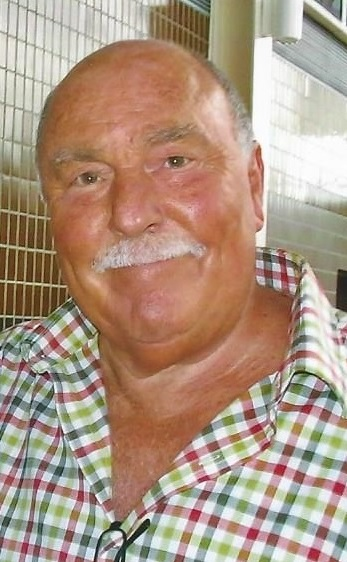
Jimmy Greaves in 2007

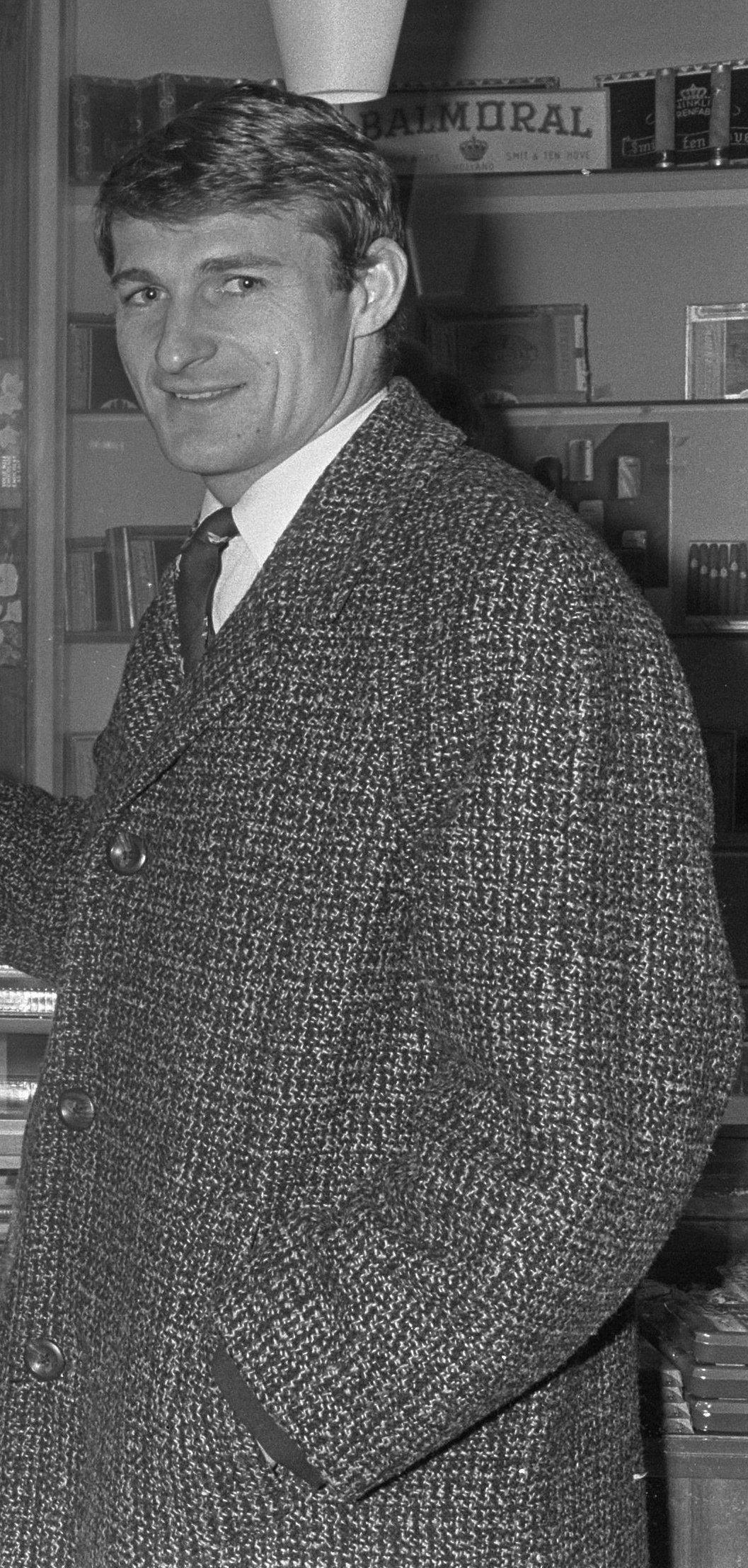
Roger Hunt in 1966

- 1 September
  - Robbie Dale, radio presenter (Radio Caroline), dementia (b. 1940).
  - Catherine MacPhail, Scottish author (Roxy's Baby) (b. 1946).
  - Sid Watson, English footballer (Mansfield Town) (b. 1927).
- 3 September – Barbara Inkpen, Olympic high jumper (1968, 1972) (b. 1949).
- 5 September
  - Sarah Harding, English singer (Girls Aloud) and actress, breast cancer (b. 1981).
  - Tony Selby, English actor (Get Some In!, Doctor Who, Witchfinder General) (b. 1938).
- 6 September – Donald Zec, journalist (Daily Mirror) (b. 1919).
- 7 September – Edward Barnes, television executive and producer, co-creator of Blue Peter (b. 1928).
- 8 September
  - Sir Antony Acland, diplomat, ambassador to the United States (1986–1991) (b. 1930).
  - Matthew Strachan, English composer (Who Wants to Be a Millionaire?) and singer-songwriter (Next Door's Baby) (b. 1970).
- 9 September
  - Sir Timothy Colman, businessman, Lord Lieutenant of Norfolk (1978–2004) (b. 1929).
  - Amanda Holden, musician, librettist (Bliss) and translator (b. 1948).
  - Bruce McFee, Scottish politician, MSP (2003–2007), complications from a stroke (b. 1961).
- 10 September
  - Michael Chapman, English singer-songwriter and guitarist (True North) (b. 1941).
  - Gordon Spice, racing driver and car constructor (Spice Engineering), cancer (b. 1940).
- 12 September – Jack D. Dunitz, Scottish chemist, co-discoverer of the Bürgi–Dunitz angle (b. 1923).
- 13 September
  - Antony Hewish, radio astronomer, Nobel Prize laureate (1974) (b. 1924).
  - Charlotte Johnson Wahl, artist, former wife of Stanley Johnson and mother of Boris, Rachel and Jo Johnson (b. 1942).
  - Colin Urquhart, neocharismatic preacher, cancer (b. 1940).
- 15 September
  - Norman Bailey, British-born opera singer (b. 1933).
  - Ephraim Einhorn, Austrian-born Orthodox rabbi (b. 1918).
  - Robert Fyfe, Scottish actor (Last of the Summer Wine, No Strings, Coronation Street), kidney disease (b. 1930).
- 16 September – Sir Clive Sinclair, inventor of the slimline pocket calculator, and founder of Sinclair Radionics, Sinclair Research and Sinclair Vehicles (b. 1940).
- 17 September
  - Avril Elgar, English actress (Spring and Port Wine, The Medusa Touch, George and Mildred). (b. 1932).
  - Tony Scott, English footballer (West Ham United, Aston Villa, Torquay United) (b. 1941).
- 18 September – Anto Finnegan, Northern Irish Gaelic footballer (Antrim), motor neurone disease (b. 1973).
- 19 September
  - John Challis, English actor (Only Fools and Horses, The Green Green Grass, Benidorm), and comedian, cancer (b. 1942).
  - Jimmy Greaves, English Hall of Fame footballer (Chelsea, Tottenham Hotspur, national team), world champion (1966) (b. 1940).
  - Terry Long, English footballer (Crystal Palace) and coach (b. 1934).
  - Morris Perry, English actor (Nothing But the Night, The Avengers, Z-Cars) (b. 1925).
  - Liam Walsh, English rugby league player (Widnes Vikings) (b. 1998).
  - Max Wiltshire, Welsh rugby union player (Aberavon RFC, Barbarian, national team) (b. 1938).
- 20 September
  - Colin Bailey, English-born jazz drummer (b. 1934).
  - Keith Macdonald, 88, Scottish rugby union player (Barbarians, national team) (b. 1933).
  - Julz Sale, English singer-songwriter and guitarist (Delta 5), cancer.
  - Ken Worden, footballer (Hobart Juventus) and manager (F.A. Selangor, Malaysia national team) (b. 1943).
- 21 September – Richard H. Kirk, English electronic musician (Cabaret Voltaire, Sweet Exorcist) and songwriter ("Yashar") (b. 1956).
- 22 September – Roger Michell, South African-born British film director (Notting Hill, Venus, My Cousin Rachel) (b. 1956).
- 24 September – Grey Ruthven, 2nd Earl of Gowrie, Irish-born politician, businessman, and arts administrator, chancellor of the Duchy of Lancaster (1984–1985) (b. 1939).
- 25 September – Len Ashurst, English footballer (Sunderland, Hartlepool United) and manager (Cardiff City) (b. 1939).
- 26 September
  - Alan Lancaster, English rock bassist (Status Quo, The Party Boys), complications from multiple sclerosis (b. 1949).
  - Mark Strudwick, military officer, general officer commanding Scotland (1997–2000) (b. 1945).
- 27 September
  - Martin Burleigh, English footballer (Darlington, Carlisle United, Hartlepool United) (b. 1951).
  - Roger Hunt, English Hall of Fame footballer (Liverpool, Bolton Wanderers, national team), world champion (1966) (b. 1938).
- 28 September – Barry Ryan, English pop singer ("Eloise") and photographer (b. 1948).
- 29 September – Glyn Moses, Welsh rugby league player (Salford, St Helens, national team) (b. 1928).
- 30 September – Greg Gilbert, English singer, guitarist, (Delays), bowel cancer (b. 1976).

=== October ===
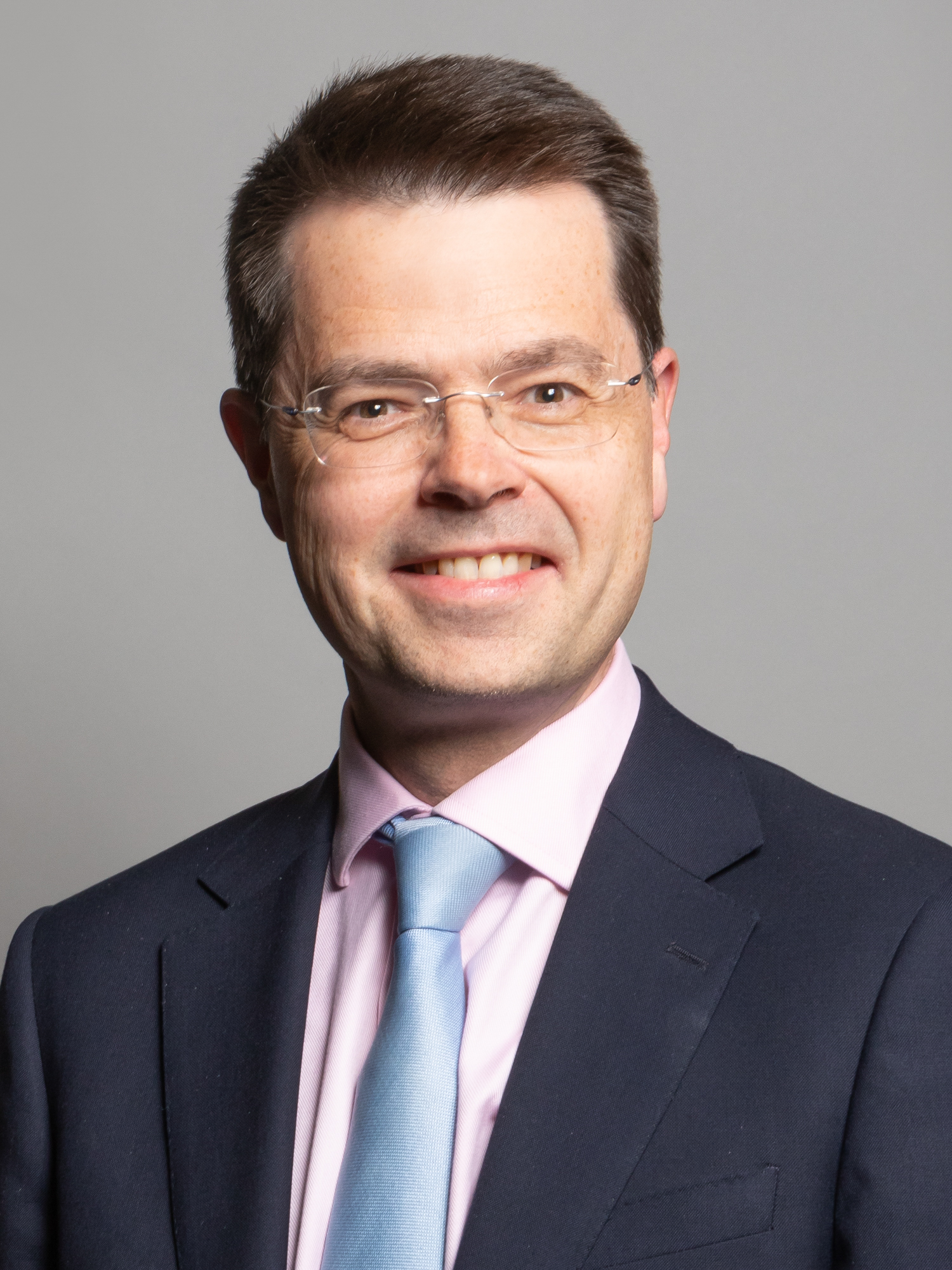
James Brokenshire in 2020

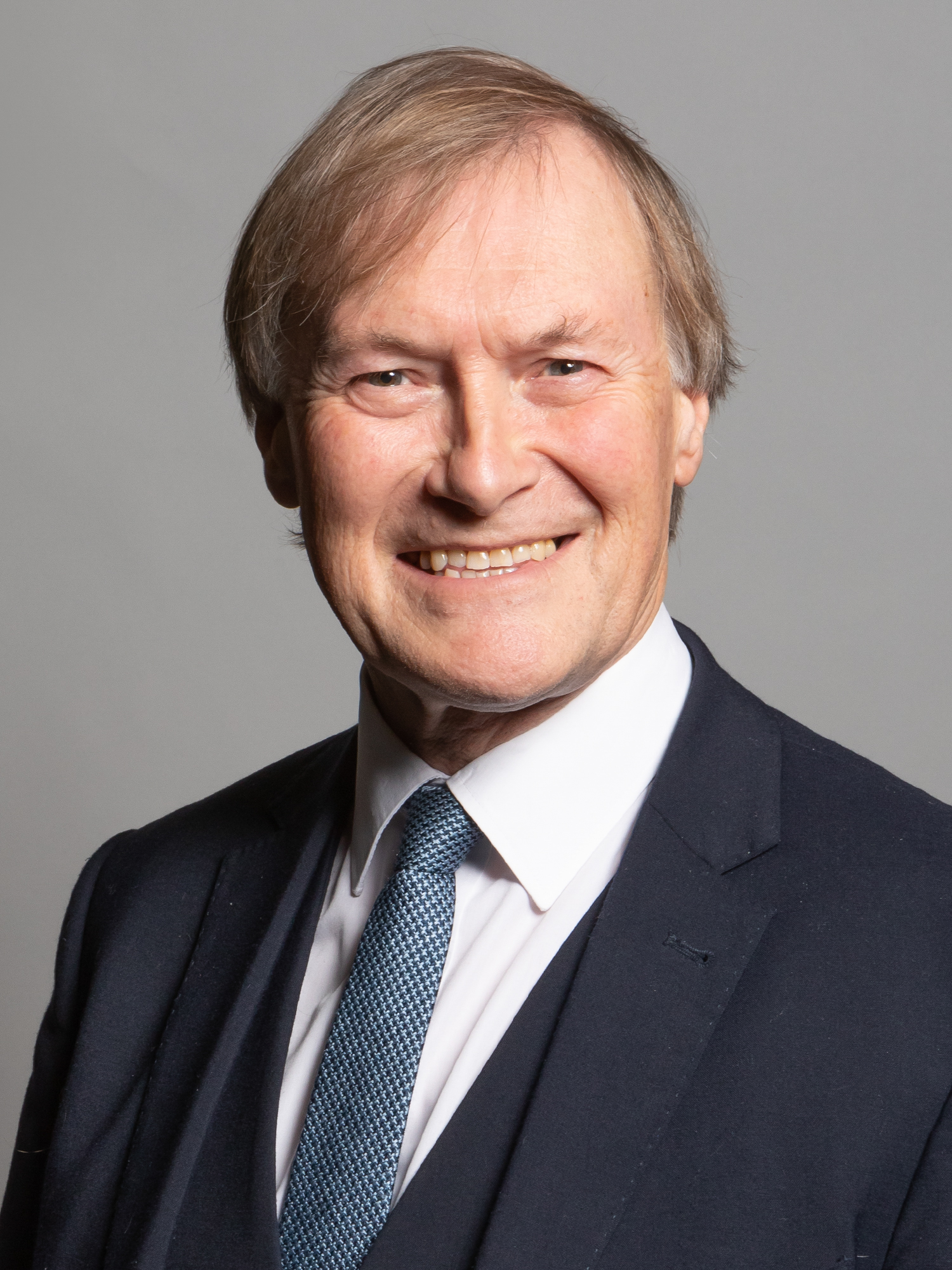
Sir David Amess in 2020

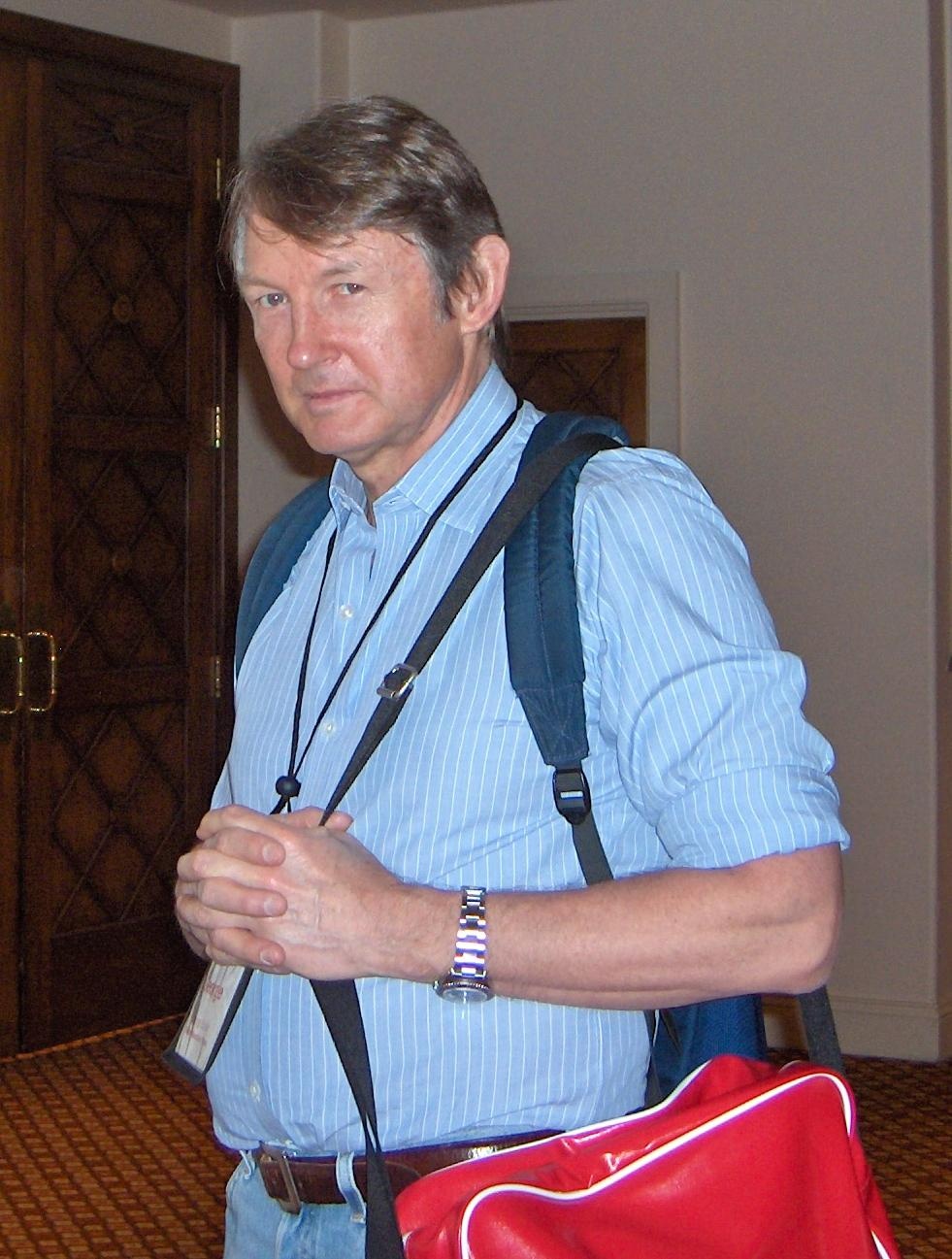
George Butler in 2004

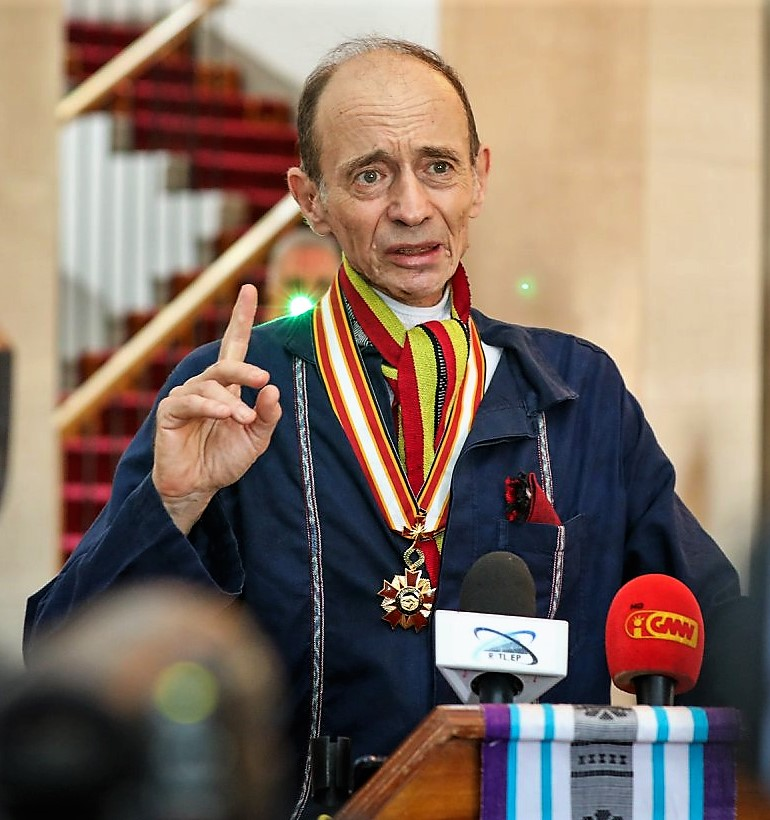
Christopher Wenner in 2019

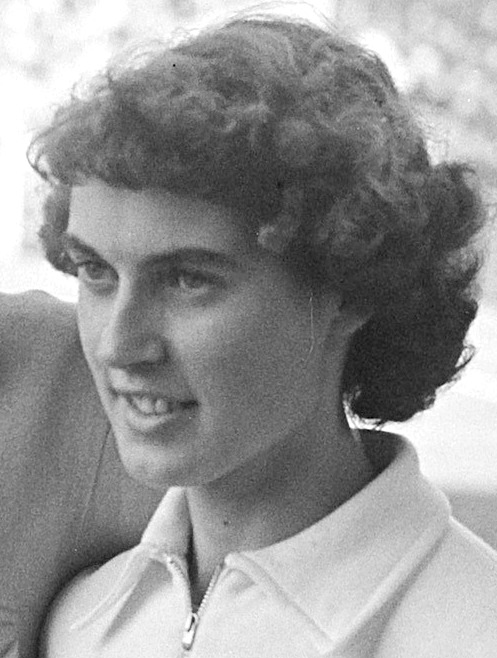
Dorothy Manley in 1950

- 1 October
  - John Blackburn, Anglican priest, chaplain general of the British Army (2000–2004) (b. 1947).
  - Fred Hill, English footballer (Bolton Wanderers, national team) (b. 1940).
  - Paul Linger, English footballer (Charlton Athletic, Brighton & Hove Albion), pancreatic cancer (b. 1974).
  - Brian Sherratt, English former footballer (Stoke City, Oxford United, Barnsley, Colchester United (b. 1944).
  - Sir Dennis Walters, politician, MP (1964–1992) (b. 1928).
- 2 October
  - Matt Holmes, military officer, Commandant General Royal Marines (2019–2021) (b. 1967).
  - Colin Pratt, English motorcycle speedway rider (Poole Pirates, Stoke Potters, Hackney Hawks), cancer (b. 1938).
  - John Rossall, English saxophonist, (The Glitter Band), cancer (b. 1945/46).
- 3 October
  - Sir John Chilcot, civil servant, kidney disease (b. 1939).
  - Alan Grahame, motorcycle speedway rider (Poole Pirates, Hull Vikings, Cradley Heathens), injuries sustained in a race collision (b. 1954).
  - Marc Pilcher, film and television make-up artist (Mary Queen of Scots, Solo: A Star Wars Story, Bridgerton), COVID-19 (b. 1967).
- 4 October
  - Terry Eades, Northern Irish footballer (Cambridge United, Watford) and manager (Histon), cancer (b. 1944).
  - Ivan Johnson, English cricketer (Worcestershire) and journalist, heart attack (b. 1953).
- 5 October – Pat Fish, English musician (The Jazz Butcher) (b. 1957).
- 6 October – Gerald Home, Northern Irish (Return of the Jedi, London Boulevard) and puppeteer (Little Shop of Horrors), liver cancer (b. 1950).
- 7 October
  - James Brokenshire, politician, MP (since 2005), secretary of state for Northern Ireland (2016–2018) and housing, communities and local government (2018–2019), lung cancer (b. 1968).
  - Johnny Gold, nightclub owner and promoter, co-founder of Tramp (b. 1932).
  - Rick Jones, Canadian-born television presenter (Play School, Fingerbobs) and musician (Meal Ticket), oesophageal cancer (b. 1937).
  - Andy Porter, Scottish footballer (Watford) (b. 1937).
- 8 October
  - Owen Luder, architect (b. 1928).
  - Everett Morton, Kittitian-born drummer (The Beat) (b. 1950).
  - Ian Ormond, Scottish-born New Zealand (Blockhouse Bay, national team) (b. 1949).
- 9 October
  - J. Martin Hunter, arbitration lawyer (b. 1937).
  - Billy Lamont, Scottish football player (Hamilton Academical) and manager (East Stirlingshire, Falkirk, Dumbarton) (b. 1936).
  - Steve Longworth, English snooker player (b. 1948).
  - Jim Pembroke, English rock musician (Wigwam) (b. 1946).
- 11 October
  - Trevor Hemmings, football club (Cork City, Preston North End) and racehorse owner (b. 1935).
  - Sir John Rogers, Royal Air Force marshal (b. 1928).
- 12 October
  - Victor Gregg, author and World War II veteran (b. 1919).
  - Renton Laidlaw, golf broadcaster and journalist, COVID-19 (b. 1939).
- 13 October
  - Frances Line, broadcasting executive, controller of BBC Radio 2 (1986–1996) (b. 1940).
  - Sir Patrick Walker, civil servant, Director General of MI5 (1988–1992) (b. 1932).
- 14 October – Sir Gerry Robinson, Irish-born television presenter (Can Gerry Robinson Fix the NHS?) and executive, chair of Arts Council England (1998–2004).
- 15 October – Sir David Amess, politician, MP (since 1983), stabbed (b. 1952).
- 16 October
  - Robert Bainbridge, English footballer (York City, Frickley Athletic, Selby Town) (b. 1931).
  - Denise Bryer, English voice actress (Terrahawks, Return to Oz, Labyrinth) (b. 1928).
  - Geoffrey Chater, English actor (Mapp & Lucia, Callan, Barry Lyndon) (b. 1921).
  - Sir Joseph Anthony Dwyer, civil engineer and businessman (b. 1939).
  - Alan Hawkshaw, composer (Grange Hill, Countdown, Channel 4 News) and pianist, pneumonia (b. 1937).
  - George Kinnell, Scottish footballer (Aberdeen, Stoke City, Sunderland) (b. 1937).
- 17 October – Ernie Ross, politician, MP (1979–2005) (b. 1942).
- 19 October
  - Leslie Bricusse, English composer (Willy Wonka & the Chocolate Factory), lyricist ("Goldfinger", "You Only Live Twice") and playwright, Oscar winner (1968, 1983) (b. 1931).
  - Sir Archie Lamb, fighter pilot and diplomat, ambassador to Norway (1978–1980) (b. 1921).
- 21 October
  - George Butler, English-American filmmaker (Pumping Iron, The Endurance: Shackleton's Legendary Antarctic Expedition, Going Upriver) (b. 1943).
  - Wes Magee, poet and children's author (b. 1939).
- 23 October – Sir Michael Rutter, child psychiatrist (b. 1933).
- 25 October – Patrick Reyntiens, stained glass artist (b. 1925).
- 26 October
  - Walter Smith, Scottish footballer (Dundee United) and manager (Rangers, national team) (b. 1948).
  - Isabel Turner, Scottish-born Canadian politician, mayor of Kingston, Ontario (2000–2003), pneumonia (b. 1936).
- 27 October
  - Sandy Carmichael, Scottish rugby union player (West of Scotland, Scotland national team, British & Irish Lions) (b. 1944).
  - Gay McIntyre, Northern Irish jazz musician (b. 1933).
  - Paul Smart, English short circuit motorcycle road racer, traffic collision (b. 1943).
- 28 October
  - Sir Peter Petrie, 5th Baronet, diplomat, ambassador to Belgium (1985–1989) (b. 1932).
  - Christopher Wenner, journalist and television presenter (b. 1954).
- 29 October
  - Kit Berry (Kirsten Espensen), author
  - Malcolm Dome, English music journalist (Record Mirror, Kerrang!, Metal Hammer) (b. 1955).
- 31 October
  - Sir Jim Lester, politician, MP (1974–1997) (b. 1932).
  - Dorothy Manley, sprinter, Olympic silver medallist (1948) (b. 1927).
  - Graham Ross, theoretical physicist (b. 1944).

=== November ===
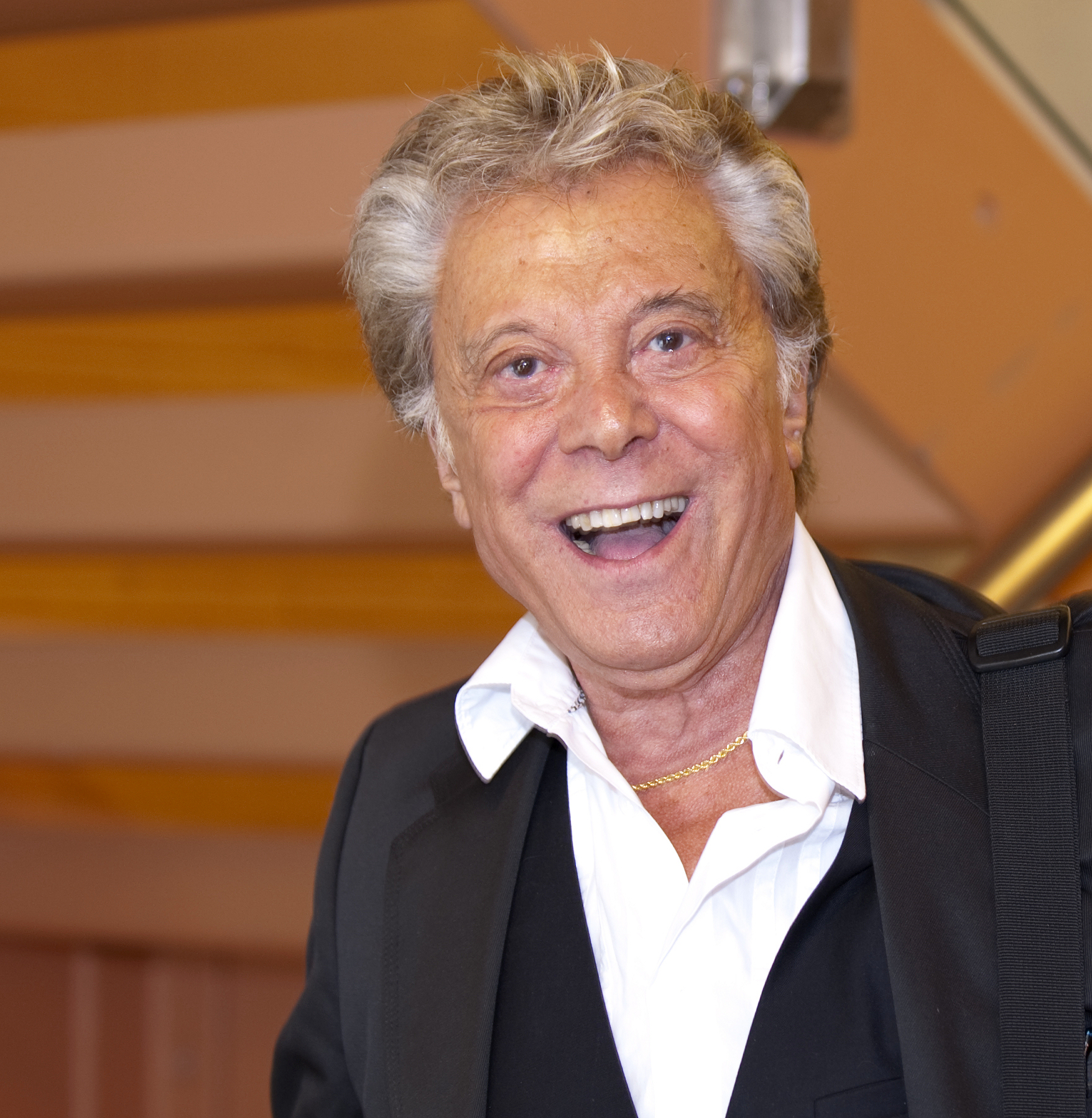
Lionel Blair in 2010

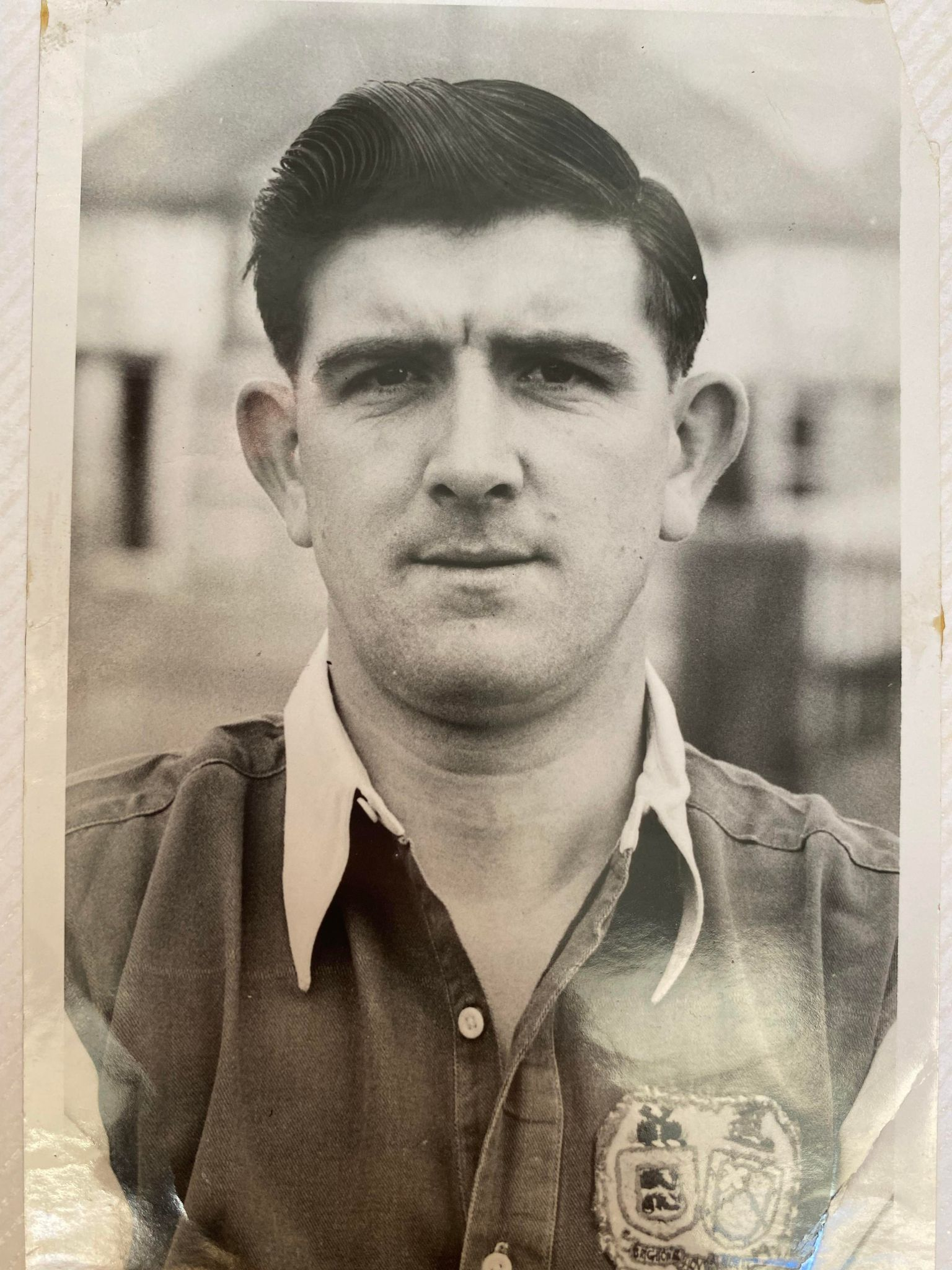
Jack Vitty

- 1 November
  - Jonathan Gledhill, English Anglican prelate, bishop of Southampton (1996–2003) and Lichfield (2003–2015) (b. 1949).
  - Alan Igglesden, English cricketer (Kent, Western Province, national team), brain cancer (b. 1964).
- 2 November
  - Kenneth Holmes, molecular biologist (b. 1934).
  - Clive Lee, design engineer (Exeter hip) (b. 1939).
  - Alf Patrick, English footballer (York City) (b. 1921).
- 3 November – Bob Baker, screenwriter (Wallace and Gromit, Doctor Who, K-9) (b. 1939).
- 4 November
  - Sir Brian Bender, civil servant (b. 1949).
  - Lionel Blair, Canadian-born actor (The Limping Man, The Cool Mikado), choreographer and television presenter (Name That Tune) (b. 1928).
  - June Lindsey, English-born Canadian physicist (b. 1922).
  - Jack Vitty, English footballer (Workington, Brighton & Hove Albion) (b. 1923).
  - Ian Wallace, ornithologist (b. 1933).
- 5 November
  - Bobby Bainbridge, English professional footballer (York City) (b. 1931).
  - Norman Macfarlane, Baron Macfarlane of Bearsden, Scottish industrialist and life peer, member of the House of Lords (1991–2016) (b. 1926).
- 6 November
  - Astro, singer and musician (UB40) (b. 1957).
  - Maureen Cleave, journalist, conducted John Lennon's "more popular than Jesus" interview (b. 1934).
  - Jim Kerray, Scottish professional footballer (b. 1935).
  - Clifford Rose, British actor (Secret Army, Kessler) (b. 1929).
- 7 November
  - Sir John Butterfill, politician, MP (1983–2010) (b. 1941).
  - Barry Jackson, English footballer (York City) (b. 1938).
  - John White, English art historian (b. 1924).
- 9 November – Laurie Sheffield, Welsh footballer (Newport County, Doncaster Rovers, Norwich City, Rotherham United, Oldham Athletic, Luton Town, Peterborough United) (b. 1939).
- 10 November – Bill Calder, Scottish footballer (Leicester City, Bury, Oxford United, Rochdale) (b. 1934).
- 12 November – Ron Flowers, English professional footballer (England, Wolverhampton Wanderers, Northampton Town) and manager (b. 1934).
- 13 November – Louis Bimpson, English footballer (Liverpool, Blackburn Rovers, Bournemouth & Boscombe Athletic, Rochdale) (b. 1929).
- 14 November – Bertie Auld, Scottish football player (Scotland, Birmingham City, Celtic) and manager (b. 1938).
- 18 November – Joe Laidlaw, English professional footballer (Middlesbrough, Carlisle United, Doncaster Rovers, Portsmouth, Hereford United, Mansfield Town) (b. 1950).
- 21 November – John Sewell, English professional footballer (Charlton Athletic, Crystal Palace, Leyton Orient) (b. 1936).
- 24 November
  - Frank Burrows, Scottish football player (Scunthorpe United, Swindon Town) and manager (Portsmouth, Cardiff City, Swansea City) (b. 1944).
  - Cliff Marshall, English professional footballer (Everton, Southport) (b. 1955).
- 25 November – Keith Morton, English professional footballer (Crystal Palace, Darlington) (b. 1934).
- 28 November – Johnny Hills, English professional footballer (Tottenham Hotspur, Bristol Rovers) (b. 1934).
- 30 November
  - Phil Dwyer, Welsh professional footballer (Wales, Cardiff City) (b. 1953).
  - Ray Kennedy, English professional footballer (England, Arsenal, Liverpool, Swansea City, Hartlepool United) (b. 1951).
  - John Sillett, English football player (Chelsea, Coventry City, Plymouth Argyle) and manager Hereford United, Coventry City) (b. 1936).

=== December ===
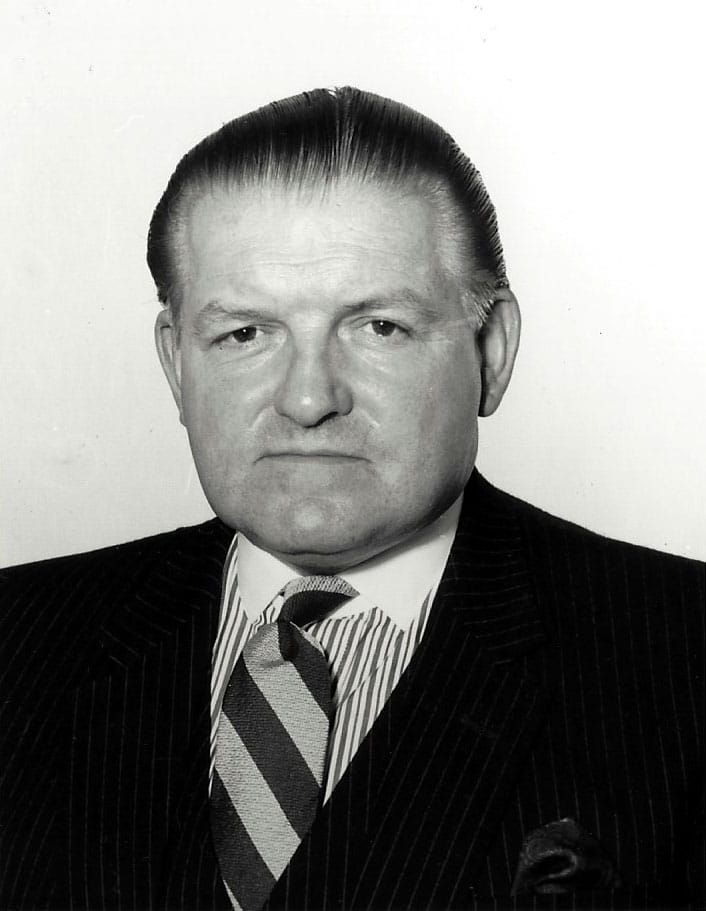
Alan Clive Roberts

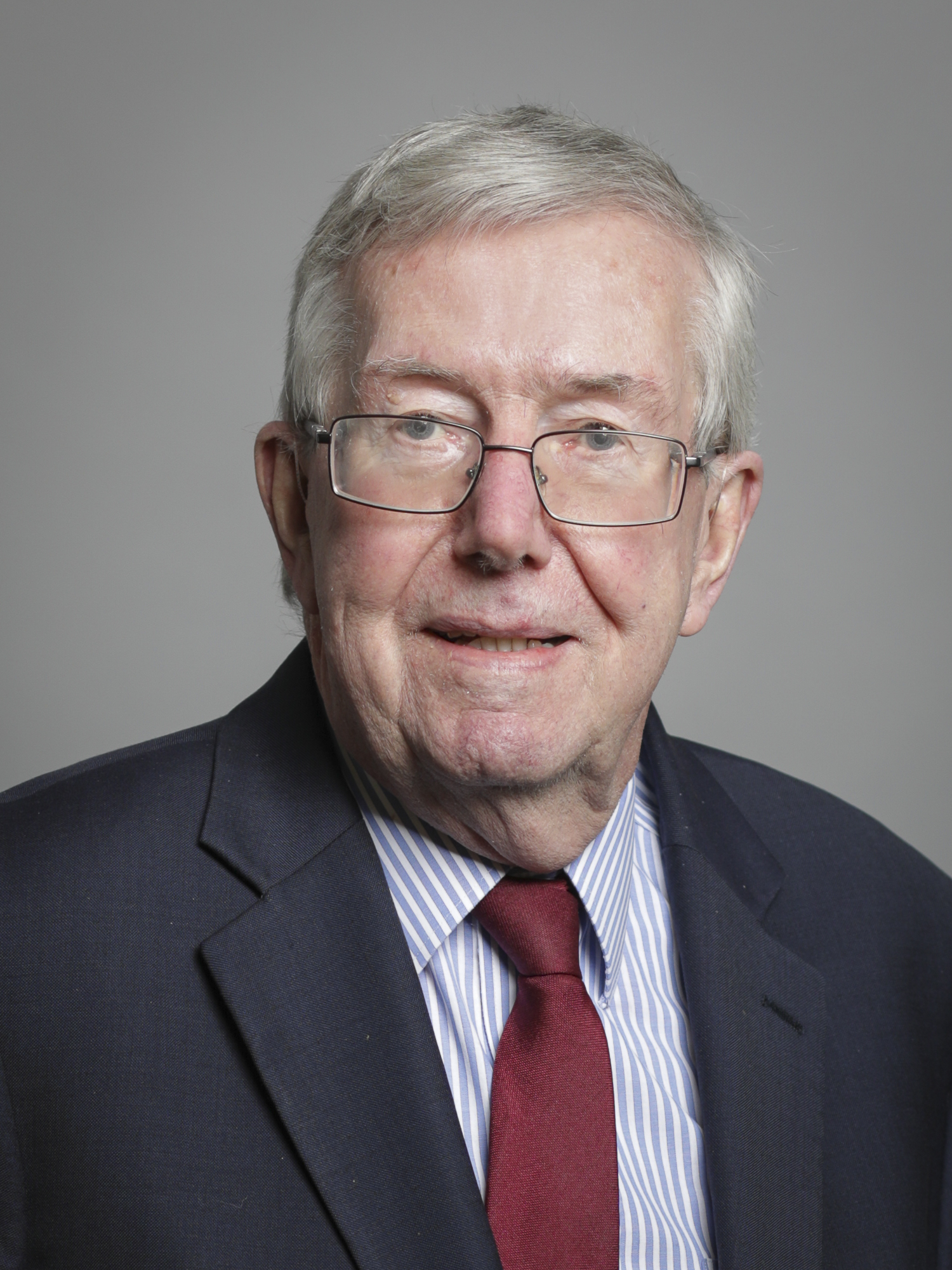
Bill McKenzie, Baron McKenzie of Luton in 2020

- 1 December
  - Bertram Bowyer, 2nd Baron Denham, politician, member of the House of Lords (1949–2021) and captain of the Honourable Corps of Gentlemen-at-Arms (1979–1991) (b. 1927).
  - John Cunningham, Scottish Roman Catholic prelate, bishop of Galloway (2004–2014) (b. 1938).
  - Alan Clive Roberts, materials scientist and engineer (b. 1934).
  - Sir John Roch, judge, Lord Justice of Appeal (1993–2000) (b. 1934).
- 2 December
  - Richard Cole, English music manager (Led Zeppelin) (b. 1946).
  - Bill McKenzie, Baron McKenzie of Luton, politician and life peer, member of the House of Lords (since 2004) (b. 1946).
  - Sir Antony Sher, South African-born actor (The History Man, Murphy's Law), cancer (b. 1949).
- 3 December
  - Fortune FitzRoy, Duchess of Grafton, courtier, mistress of the Robes (since 1967) (b. 1920).
  - Robert Holman, dramatist (Rafts and Dreams, A Thousand Stars Explode in the Sky) (b. 1952).
- 4 December – John Barton, English businessman, chairman of Next plc and EasyJet (b. 1944).
- 5 December
  - Gary Callander, Scottish rugby union player (Kelso, national team) and coach (Watsonian), pancreatic cancer (b. 1959).
  - John Miles, English singer-songwriter ("Music") and musician (b. 1949).
- 6 December – Marvin Morgan, English professional footballer (Aldershot Town, Dagenham & Redbridge, Shrewsbury Town, Plymouth Argyle, Hartlepool United) (b. 1983).
- 13 December – Toby Slater, English singer-songwriter and musician (Catch) (b. 1979).
- 14 December
  - Jethro, British stand-up comedian and singer (b. 1948).
  - Jimmy Robson, English professional footballer (Burnley, Blackpool, Barnsley, Bury) (b. 1939).
- 15 December – Willie McSeveney, Scottish footballer (Dunfermline Athletic, Motherwell) (b. 1929).
- 16 December – John Archer, English former footballer (Port Vale, Bournemouth & Buscombe Athletic, Crewe Alexandra, Chesterfield) (b. 1941).
- 17 December
  - John Morgan, English drummer (The Wurzels), COVID-19 (b. 1941).
  - Trevor Thompson, English professional footballer (West Bromwich Albion, Newport County, Lincoln City) (b. 1955).
- 18 December – Richard Rogers, architect of the Lloyd's building, Millennium Dome and "Cheesegrater" (b. 1933).
- 19 December – Sally Ann Howes, English actress (Chitty Chitty Bang Bang, Brigadoon, The Admirable Crichton) and singer (b. 1930).
- 25 December – Janice Long, English radio broadcaster (Top of the Pops) (b. 1955).
- 27 December – April Ashley, English model, actress (The Road to Hong Kong) and writer (b. 1935).
- 29 December – Steve Peplow, English footballer (Liverpool, Swindon Town, Nottingham Forest, Tranmere Rovers) (b. 1949).
- 30 December – Denis O'Dell, film producer (A Hard Day's Night, Heaven's Gate) and assistant director (Scrooge) (b. 1923).

== See also ==
- Politics in the United Kingdom
- 2020s in United Kingdom political history
- 2021–present United Kingdom cost-of-living crisis
- 2021 in United Kingdom politics and government
- Timeline of the COVID-19 pandemic in the United Kingdom (2021)
- 2021 in British music
- 2021 in British television
- List of British films of 2021
