= 2021 in England =

- Centuries: 19th; 20th; 21st
- Decades: 2000s; 2010s; 2020s
- See also: 2020–21 in English football 2021–22 in English football 2021 in the United Kingdom; Other events of 2021

Events of 2021 in England

== Incumbent ==
- Monarch - Elizabeth II
- Prime Minister - Boris Johnson

== Events ==
- COVID-19 in England: Most of England's primary schools reopen after the Christmas break, amid concerns over whether pupils should be returning during the current level of COVID-19 infections. However, this decision is reversed by the following day.
- 5 January – A third COVID-19 lockdown was announced by the then Prime Minister Boris Johnson and was expected to last until mid-February.
- 3 March – Sarah Everard disappeared and was found dead a week later.
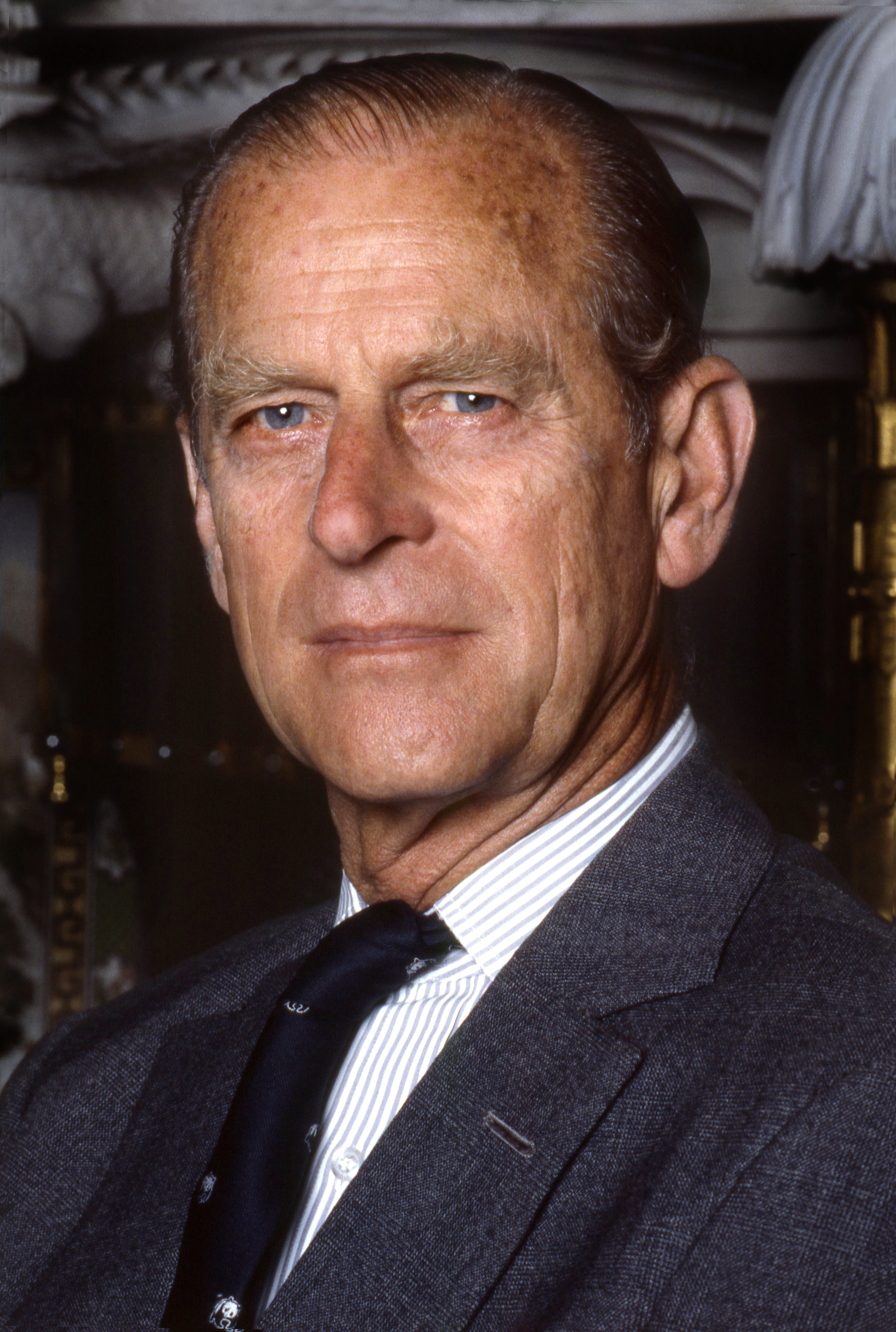
- Prince Philip, Duke of Edinburgh died 9 April 2021.
  9 April – Buckingham Palace announced the death of Prince Philip, Duke of Edinburgh at the age of 99.
- 6 May –
  - A series of elections are due to take place for local councils and directly elected mayors in England, police and crime commissioners in England and Wales
  - London Assembly election
  - London mayoral election
- 21 May – Plastic bag charge rises to 10p per bag and extends to all shops.
- 11 June – 11 July – UEFA Euro 2020 begins, with England hosting and participating in Group D at Wembley Stadium, London. They advance to the final where they draw 1-1 with Italy and lose 3-2 after a penalty shoot-out.
- 5 July – An inquest found police failings partly responsible for causing the death of Susan Nicholson by killer Robert Trigg.
- 28 June – Elephant & Castle fire
- 26 July – Marble Arch Mound
- 12 August – Plymouth shooting
- 17 September - Murder of Sabina Nessa
- 15 October - Murder of David Amess
- 31 October - 2021 Salisbury rail crash
- 9 November - Murder of Pauline Quinn
- 14 November - Liverpool Women's Hospital bombing
- 25 November - Murder of Ava White

=== Scheduled and predicted events ===
- Unknown date –
  - The construction of the United Kingdom's largest solar farm in the village of Graveney, Kent will begin in spring 2021 which was given the go-ahead by Business secretary Alok Sharma in May 2020.

== Births ==
- 9 February – August Brooksbank, son of Princess Eugenie and Jack Brooksbank

== Deaths ==
- 5 January – Colin Bell, footballer (England, Bury, Manchester City) (b. 1946)
- 10 January – Mark Keds, punk musician (b. 1970)
- 16 January – Charlotte Cornwell, actress (b. 1949)
- 20 January – John Russell, musician (b. 1954)
- 2 February – Peter Dunn, paediatrician (b. 1929)
- 13 March – Murray Walker, motorsport commentator and journalist (b. 1923)
- 31 March – Jane Manning, soprano (b. 1938)
- 30 April – Anthony Payne, composer (b. 1936)
- 23 June – Jackie Lane, actress (Doctor Who, Compact) (b. 1941)
- 25 June – Brian Bamford, professional golfer (b. 1935)
- 9 July – Joan Le Mesurier, actress and writer (b. 1931)
- 10 July – Carmel Budiardjo, human rights activist, founder of Tapol, and author (b. 1925)
- 15 July – Andy Fordham, darts player, world champion (2004), organ failure (b. 1962)
- 17 July – Graham Vick, opera director, COVID-19 (b. 1953)
- 18 July – Tom O'Connor, comedian and game show host (Crosswits, The Zodiac Game, Name That Tune), complications from Parkinson's disease (b. 1939)
- 31 July – Terry Cooper, footballer (Leeds United, national team) and manager (Bristol City) (b. 1944)
- 1 August – Ian Thomson, cricketer (national team) (b. 1929)
- 2 August – Ged Dunn, rugby league footballer (Hull Kingston Rovers, national team) (b. 1946)
- 15 October - David Amess, MP for Southend West (b. 1952)

== Other ==
- 10 November - Natural England designated large parts of the Swanscombe Peninsula as a SSSI

== See also ==
- 2021 in Northern Ireland
- 2021 in Scotland
- 2021 in Wales
- Politics of England
