= List of attendees of the 47th ASEAN and Related Summits =

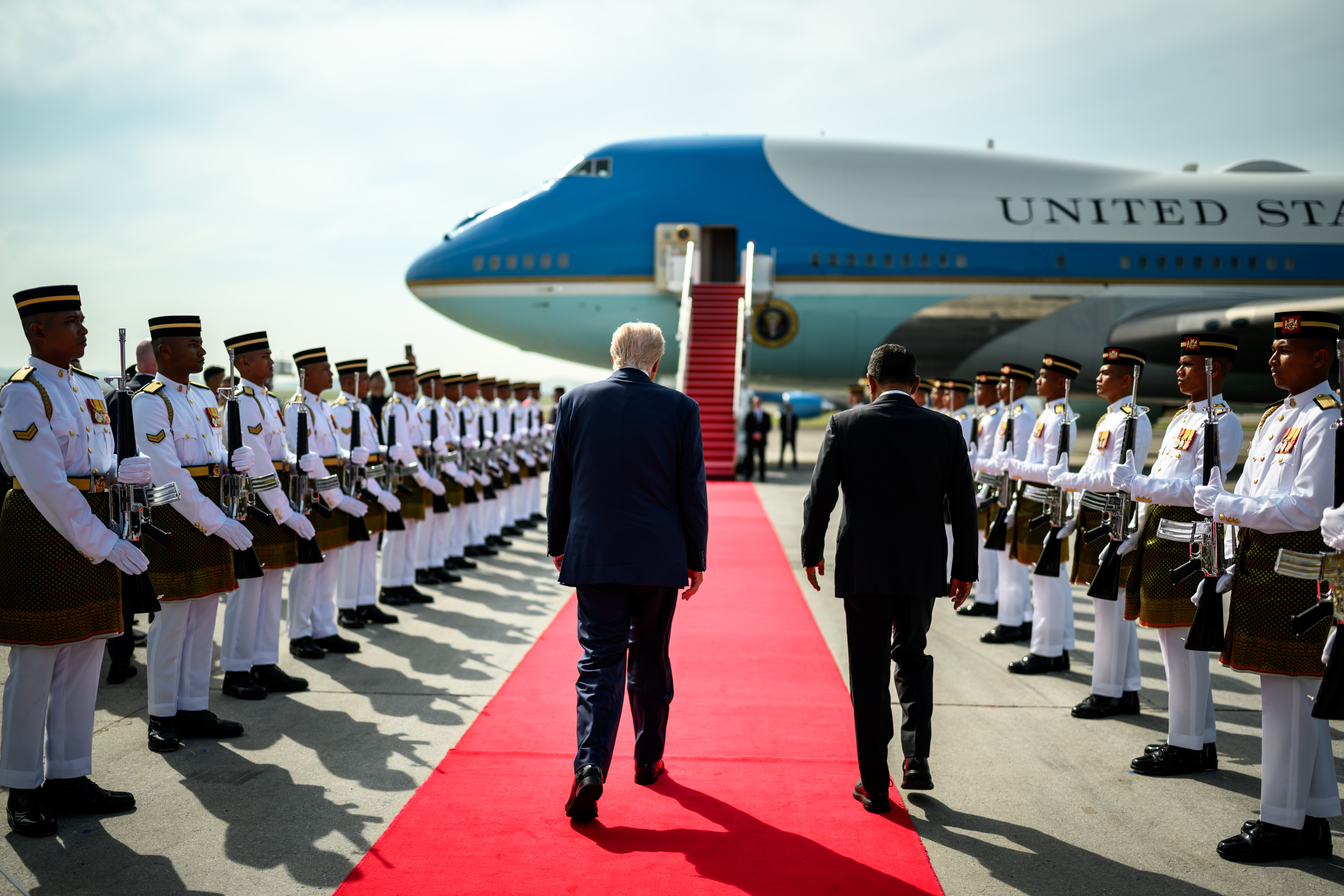
U.S. President Donald Trump walks towards Air Force One as he bids farewell to Malaysian Home Minister Saifuddin Nasution Ismail at Kuala Lumpur International Airport (KLIA) on 27 October 2025.

The 47th ASEAN and Related Summits officially took place between 26 and 28 October 2025 at the Kuala Lumpur Convention Centre, Kuala Lumpur, Malaysia.

In addition to the heads of states and governments of the 10-member Association of Southeast Asian Nations (ASEAN) (Timor-Leste completed its accession to become the 11th member during this edition), various other foreign dignitaries including leaders from Australia, Brazil, China, Japan, South Korea, New Zealand, the Russia, South Africa, and the United States, were invited. The Indian prime minister attended the 22nd ASEAN–India Summit virtually and was represented by his external affairs minister, S. Jaishankar. This list only includes arrivals of senior dignitaries and officials, generally at permanent secretary level and above, whose arrivals or presence can be confirmed. For example, Chinese commerce minister Wang Wentao's arrival was not reported but was later announced to be present at the 28th ASEAN–China Summit held on the 28 October.

Timor-Leste's prime minister, José Alexandre Gusmão, was the first head of state/government to arrive and also the last to depart.

== List ==
*	Head of state
^	Head of government
†	Minister-in-charge of foreign affairs portfolio

Representative	State/Organisation	Position	Arrival (+08:00)	Ref.
Gilbert Fossoun Houngbo	International Labour Organization (ILO)	Director-General	20 October 2025	
Armida Salsiah Alisjahbana	UNESCAP	Executive Secretary	22 October 2025	
Eksiri Pintaruchi	Thailand	Permanent Secretary, Ministry of Foreign Affairs; ASEAN SOM Leader of Thailand	22 October 2025	
Kung Phoak	Cambodia	Secretary of State, Ministry of Foreign Affairs and International Cooperation; ASEAN SOM Leader of Cambodia	14:00, 22 October 2025	
Milena Rangel	Timor-Leste	Vice Minister (ASEAN Affairs), Ministry of Foreign Affairs and Cooperation; ASEAN SOM Leader of Timor-Leste	19:35, 22 October 2025	
Satvinder Singh	ASEAN	Deputy Secretary-General (ASEAN Economic Community)	19:45, 22 October 2025	
Phongsavanh Sisoulath	Laos	Deputy Minister, Ministry of Foreign Affairs; ASEAN SOM Leader of Lao People's Democratic Republic	19:50, 22 October 2025	
Johariah Abdul Wahab	Brunei	Permanent Secretary, Ministry of Foreign Affairs; ASEAN SOM Leader of Brunei Darussalam	20:25, 22 October 2025	
Thongsavanh Phomvihane†	Laos	Minister, Ministry of Foreign Affairs	20:25, 22 October 2025	
Sidharto Reza Suryodipuro	Indonesia	Director-General (ASEAN Cooperation), Ministry of Foreign Affairs; ASEAN SOM Leader of Indonesia	23 October 2025	
Albert Chua	Singapore	Permanent Secretary, Ministry of Foreign Affairs; ASEAN SOM Leader of Singapore	23 October 2025	
Đặng Hoàng Giang	Vietnam	Deputy Minister, Ministry of Foreign Affairs; ASEAN SOM Leader of Vietnam	23 October 2025	
U Hau Khan Sum	Myanmar	Permanent Secretary, Ministry of Foreign Affairs; ASEAN SOM Leader of Myanmar	11:35, 23 October 2025	
Maria Theresa Parreño Lazaro†	Philippines	Secretary, Department of Foreign Affairs	16:50, 23 October 2025	
Maria Hellen Barber De La Vega	Philippines	Undersecretary (Bilateral Relations & ASEAN Affairs), Department of Foreign Affairs; ASEAN SOM Leader of the Philippines	16:50, 23 October 2025	
Erywan Bin Mohd. Yusof†	Brunei	Minister II, Ministry of Foreign Affairs	20:24, 23 October 2025	
Sihasak Phuangketkeow†	Thailand	Minister, Ministry of Foreign Affairs	20:30, 23 October 2025	
Prak Sokhonn†	Cambodia	Deputy Prime Minister; Minister, Ministry of Foreign Affairs and International Cooperation	21:25, 23 October 2025	
Jamieson Lee Greer	United States	Trade Representative, Executive Office of the President	23 October 2025	(Note: In his interview with Fox Business on 22 October 2025 (EDT), United States Secretary of the Treasury Scott Bessent mentioned that United States Trade Representative (USTR) Greer was "already on his way" and that he himself will make the journey to Kuala Lumpur that very evening. The departure time of the USTR based on the treasury secretary's comments provides for an estimated arrival time of around the evening or night of 23 October 2025 (MYT). Accordingly, Secretary Bessent himself is likely to have arrived in the morning of 24 October.)
Suphajee Suthumpun	Thailand	Minister, Ministry of Commerce	<07:30, 24 October 2025	
Gan Kim Yong	Singapore	Deputy Prime Minister; Minister, Ministry of Trade and Industry	<07:30, 24 October 2025	
Airlangga Hartarto	Indonesia	Coordinating Minister, Coordinating Ministry for Economic Affairs	<07:30, 24 October 2025	
Bendito dos Santos Freitas†	Timor-Leste	Minister, Ministry of Foreign Affairs and Cooperation	09:50, 24 October 2025	
Scott Kenneth Homer Bessent	United States	Secretary, Department of the Treasury	24 October 2025	
Djamari Chaniago	Indonesia	Coordinating Minister, Coordinating Ministry for Politics and Security Affairs	11:48, 24 October 2025	
Sugiono†	Indonesia	Minister, Ministry of Foreign Affairs	11:48, 24 October 2025	
José Alexandre Gusmão^	Timor-Leste	Prime Minister	12:30, 24 October 2025	
Marcio Fernando Elias Rosa	Brazil	Executive Secretary, Ministry of Development, Industry, Trade and Services	15:30, 24 October 2025	
Carlos Henrique Baqueta Fávaro	Brazil	Minister, Ministry of Agriculture	15:30, 24 October 2025	
Luciana Barbosa de Oliveira Santos	Brazil	Minister, Ministry of Science, Technology and Innovation	15:30, 24 October 2025	
Luiz Inácio Lula da Silva*	Brazil	President	15:30, 24 October 2025	
Mauro Luiz Iecker Vieira†	Brazil	Minister, Ministry of Foreign Affairs	15:30, 24 October 2025	
Hassanal Bolkiah*	Brunei	Sultan; Minister, Ministry of Foreign Affairs	18:30, 24 October 2025	
Abdul Mateen	Brunei	Deputy Chairman II, Jabatan Adat Istiadat Negara, Prime Minister's Office	18:30, 24 October 2025	
José Manuel Ramos-Horta*	Timor-Leste	President	18:30, 24 October 2025	
Kao Kim Hourn	ASEAN	Secretary-General	18:57, 24 October 2025	
Elina Maria Valtonen†	Finland	Minister, Ministry of Foreign Affairs	22:20, 24 October 2025	
Ronald Ozzy Lamola†	South Africa	Minister, Department of International Relations and Cooperation	<23:00, 24 October 2025	
Matamela Cyril Ramaphosa*	South Africa	President	23:00, 24 October 2025	
He Lifeng	China	Second Vice Premier, State Council; Director, Office of the Central Financial and Economic Affairs Commission	23:15, 24 October 2025	
Li Chenggang	China	International Trade Representative, Ministry of Commerce; Vice Minister, Ministry of Commerce	23:15, 24 October 2025	
Liao Min	China	Vice Minister, Ministry of Finance	23:15, 24 October 2025	
Cham Nimul	Cambodia	Minister, Ministry of Commerce	<08:20, 25 October 2025	(Note: Official was seen in the group photo upon the conclusion of the ASEAN Joint Foreign and Economic Ministers' Meeting, confirming his/her presence at the meeting which began at 8:20 MYT.)
Mohd. Amin Liew Bin Abdullah	Brunei	Minister II, Ministry of Finance and Economy; Minister, Prime Minister's Office	<08:20, 25 October 2025	
Filipus Nino Pereira	Timor-Leste	Minister, Ministry of Tourism, Trade and Industry	<08:20, 25 October 2025	
Ceferino Rodolfo	Philippines	Undersecretary (Industry Development Group), Department of Trade and Industry	<08:20, 25 October 2025	
Vivian Balakrishnan†	Singapore	Minister, Ministry of Foreign Affairs	08:20, 25 October 2025	
Ferdinand Romualdez Marcos Jr.*	Philippines	President	14:55, 25 October 2025	
Gianni Infantino	FIFA	President	<19:52, 25 October 2025	
António Luís Santos da Costa	European Council	President	17:20, 25 October 2025	
Hun Manet^	Cambodia	Prime Minister	18:15, 25 October 2025	
Sanae Takaichi^	Japan	Prime Minister	19:29, 25 October 2025	
Sonexay Siphandone^	Laos	Prime Minister	20:21, 25 October 2025	
Prabowo Subianto*	Indonesia	President	21:00, 25 October 2025	
Anutin Charnvirakul^	Thailand	Prime Minister; Minister, Ministry of Interior	21:24, 25 October 2025	
Lawrence Wong Shyun Tsai^	Singapore	Prime Minister; Minister, Ministry of Finance	22:17, 25 October 2025	
Kristalina Georgieva	International Monetary Fund (IMF)	Managing Director	22:30, 25 October 2025	
Carlos Filipe Jaramillo	World Bank Group (WBG)	Vice President (East Asia and the Pacific)	22:30, 25 October 2025	
Mark Joseph Carney^	Canada	Prime Minister	23:15, 25 October 2025	
Maninder Sidhu	Canada	Minister (Export Promotion, International Trade), Global Affairs Canada	23:15, 25 October 2025	
Phạm Minh Chính^	Vietnam	Prime Minister	01:30, 26 October 2025	
António Manuel de Oliveira Guterres	United Nations	Secretary-General	01:30, 26 October 2025	
Jacob Helberg	United States	Under Secretary (Economic Growth, Energy, and the Environment), Department of State	09:54, 26 October 2025	
Marco Rubio†	United States	Secretary, Department of State; National Security Advisor (acting), Executive Office of the President	09:54, 26 October 2025	
Donald Trump*	United States	President	09:54, 26 October 2025	
Lee Jae Myung*	South Korea	President	14:45, 26 October 2025	
Anthony Norman Albanese^	Australia	Prime Minister	15:00, 26 October 2025	
Li Qiang^	China	Premier, State Council	16:17, 26 October 2025	
Alexey Overchuk	Russia	Deputy Prime Minister (Eurasian Integration, cooperation with the CIS, BRICS, and G20, and International Events)	17:00, 26 October 2025	
Andrey Rudenko	Russia	Deputy Minister, Ministry of Foreign Affairs	17:00, 26 October 2025	
Nicola Anna Grigg	New Zealand	Minister, Ministry for Women; Minister of State (Trade and Investment), Ministry of Foreign Affairs and Trade	17:30, 26 October 2025	
Christopher Mark Luxon^	New Zealand	Prime Minister	17:30, 26 October 2025	
Cho Hyun†	South Korea	Minister, Ministry of Foreign Affairs	<18:05, 26 October 2025	
Subrahmanyam Jaishankar†	India	Minister, Ministry of External Affairs	<18:05, 26 October 2025	(Note: It is estimated that India's external affairs minister, S. Jaishankar, arrived into Kuala Lumpur between the morning and noon of 26 October 2025 as he was reported to have attended bilateral meetings with several foreign officials in the afternoon. The first of which was a meeting with the Republic of Korea's foreign minister, Cho Hyun.)
Toshimitsu Motegi†	Japan	Minister, Ministry of Foreign Affairs	18:20, 26 October 2025	
Narendra Damodardas Modi^	India	Prime Minister	18:28, 26 October 2025 (Note: Virtual attendance.)	

== Logistics ==
The following list details the equipment used to ferry respective heads of states, governments, the deputy prime minister of the Russian Federation, and the secretary-general of the United Nations to attend the 47th ASEAN and Related Summits. (Note: No information is available regarding the transport used by the prime minister of the Lao PDR.) (Note: Singapore's prime minister was the only leader known to have commuted to and from the summit utilising commercial flights, touching down at Kuala Lumpur International Airport onboard Malaysia Airlines Flight 610 and, upon the conclusion of the summit on 28 October 2025, departing on Singapore Airlines Flight 125.) Both the civilian Kuala Lumpur International Airport and dual civilian-military RMAF Subang Air Base was used to cater to the vast number of executive and military aircraft involved in this summit due to "logistical" reasons.

Representative	Transport	Aircraft	Registration	Origin	Destination	Ref.	Duration
Primary Aircraft
(Timor-Leste) José Alexandre Gusmão	Aero Dili	Airbus A319-115	4W-AAO	DIL	KUL		5 days
(Brazil) Luiz Inácio Lula da Silva	Brazilian Air Force	Airbus VC-1A / Airbus A319-133(CJ)	FAB2101	HLP	KUL		3 days and 16 hours
(Brazil) Luiz Inácio Lula da Silva	Brazilian Air Force	Airbus C-30 / Airbus A330-243	FAB2901	KUL	BSB via JNB		3 days and 16 hours
(Brunei) Hassanal Bolkiah	Government of Brunei – Sultan's Flight	Boeing 747-8LQ(BBJ)	V8-BKH	BWN	SZB		3 days and 23 hours
(Timor-Leste) José Manuel Ramos-Horta	Aero Dili	Airbus A320-232	4W-AAL	DIL	KUL		4 days and 7 hours
(South Africa) Matamela Cyril Ramaphosa	South African Air Force	Boeing 737-7ED(BBJ)	ZS-RSA	HAN	KUL		2 days and 22 hours
(Philippines) Ferdinand Romualdez Marcos Jr.	Philippine Airlines	Airbus A321-271N	RP-C9936	MNL	KUL		3 days and 8 hours
(Cambodia) Manet Hun	Government of Cambodia	Airbus A320-214	B-6738	KTI	KUL		2 days and 23 hours
(Japan) Sanae Takaichi	Japan Air Self-Defense Force	Boeing 777-3SBER	80-1112	HND	KUL		1 day and 2 hours
(Laos) Sonexay Siphandone					KUL		3 days and 3 hours
(Indonesia) Prabowo Subianto	Garuda Indonesia	Boeing 777-3U3ER	PK-GIG	HLP	SZB		1 day and 18 hours
(Thailand) Anutin Charnvirakul	Royal Thai Air Force	Airbus A320-214(CJ) Prestige	HS-TYT	DMK	SZB		16 hours
(Thailand) Anutin Charnvirakul	Royal Thai Air Force	Airbus A320-214(CJ) Prestige	HS-TYT	DMK	SZB		2 days and 14 hours
(Singapore) Shyun Tsai Lawrence Wong	Malaysia Airlines	Boeing 737-8 MAX	9M-MVE	SIN	KUL		2 days and 22 hours
(Singapore) Shyun Tsai Lawrence Wong	Singapore Airlines	Airbus A350-941	9V-SHY	KUL	SIN		2 days and 22 hours
(Canada) Mark Joseph Carney	Royal Canadian Air Force	Airbus CC-330 Husky	330002	YOW	KUL via HNL		2 days and 12 hours
(Vietnam) Minh Chính Phạm	Vietnam Airlines	Airbus A350-941	VN-A891	HAN	KUL		2 days and 18 hours
(United Nations) António Manuel de Oliveira Guterres	Vietnam Airlines	Airbus A350-941	VN-A891	HAN	KUL		
(United States) Donald J. Trump	United States Air Force	Boeing VC-25A	92-9000	ADW	KUL via XJD		1 day
(South Korea) Jae Myung Lee	Republic of Korea Air Force	Boeing 747-8B5	22001	SSN	KUL		1 day and 1 hour
(Australia) Anthony Norman Albanese	Royal Australian Air Force	Airbus KC-30A	A39-007	CBR	SZB via DRW		2 days and 14 hours
(China) Qiang Li	Air China	Boeing 747-89L	B-2480	SIN	KUL		1 day and 22 hours
(Russia) Alexey Overchuk	Russia – Special Flight Squadron	Ilyushin IL-96-300	RA-96019	VKO	SZB		2 days and 8 hours
(New Zealand) Christopher Mark Luxon	Royal New Zealand Air Force	Boeing 757-2K2(C)	NZ7571	MHB	KUL via CNS		2 days and 5 hours
Secondary Aircraft
(Japan) Sanae Takaichi	All Nippon Airways	Boeing 787-9 Dreamliner	JA927A	HND	KUL		1 day and 2 hours
(United States) Donald J. Trump	United States Air Force	Boeing C-32A	09-0015	ADW	KUL via RMS, XJD		23 hours
(United States) Donald J. Trump	United States Air Force	Boeing C-32A	98-0002	TLV	SZB via XJD		1 day and 5 hours
