= SLTA =

SLTA may refer to:

- Soltau-Lüneburg Training Area, a military training area in North Germany from 1963 to 1994
- Sri Lanka Tennis Association, a national sport governing body
- Tennis Scotland, formerly the Scottish Lawn Tennis Association
- Taquipirenda Airport in Bolivia (by ICAO code)
- Sekolah Lanjutan Tingkat Atas, an Indonesian acronym for high school
- Small Laser Transmitter Assembly, used in Directional Infrared Counter Measures devices
