= Spot the Tune =

British TV game show (1956–1962)

Spot the Tune is a British television game show which aired from 1956 to 1962 on ITV. It was produced by Granada Television. It was very similar to the popular US series Name That Tune (a format which would be picked up by ITV/Thames in the 1970s, when the British version was hosted by Tom O'Connor). In 1958, Des O'Connor joined the show, which also featured Ted Ray, Pete Murray and singer Marion Ryan (who was also known for being Paul and Barry Ryan's mother).

210 episodes were produced, of which only five are known to survive.
