= Francisco Kalbuadi Lay =

East Timorese politician

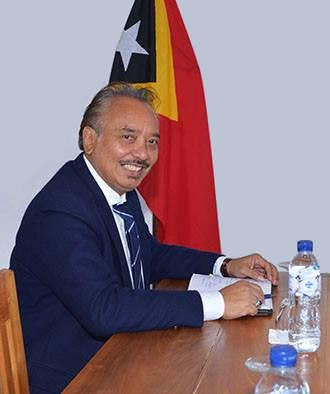

Deputy Prime Minister of East Timor
- Incumbent
- Assumed office 1 July 2023 Serving with Mariano "Assanami" Lopes
- Prime Minister: Xanana Gusmão
- Preceded by: Armanda Berta dos Santos; José Reis

Coordinating Minister of Economic Affairs
- Incumbent
- Assumed office 1 July 2023
- Prime Minister: Xanana Gusmão
- Preceded by: Joaquim Amaral

Minister of Tourism and Environment
- Incumbent
- Assumed office 1 July 2023
- Prime Minister: Xanana Gusmão
- Preceded by: Joaquim Amaral; (as Coordinating Minister of Economic Affairs); José Lucas do Carmo da Silva; (as Minister of Tourism, Trade and Industry)

Minister of Tourism, Arts and Culture
- In office 16 February 2015 – 15 September 2017
- Prime Minister: Rui Maria de Araújo
- Preceded by: Himself; (as Minister of Tourism); Maria Isabel de Jesus Ximenes; (as Secretary of State for Art and Culture)
- Succeeded by: Manuel Vong; (as Minister of Tourism); Fernando Hanjam; (as Minister of Education and Culture)

Minister of Tourism
- In office 8 August 2012 – 16 February 2015
- Prime Minister: Xanana Gusmão
- Preceded by: Gil Alves; (as Minister of Tourism, Commerce and Industry)
- Succeeded by: Himself; (as Minister of Tourism, Arts and Culture)

Personal details
- Born: Francisco Lay; 7 February 1954 (age 72): Portuguese Timor; (now Timor-Leste)
- Party: National Congress for Timorese Reconstruction (CNRT)
- Nickname: Chico

Francisco Kalbuadi "Chico" Lay (né Francisco Lay; born 7 February 1954) is an East Timorese politician, businessman and sports administrator, and a member of the National Congress for Timorese Reconstruction (Portuguese: Congresso Nacional de Reconstrução de Timor, CNRT).

He is the more senior of East Timor's two incumbent Deputy Prime Ministers, (Note: The Constitution of Timor-Leste provides, in sections 104 and 105, for the appointment of officials referred to in its English language version as "Deputy Ministers". In other English language publications, those officials are commonly referred to as "Vice Ministers", even though the word "Vice", in context, arguably has a different meaning in English from the word "Deputy". In this article, the constitutional expression "Deputy" is used.) and also the incumbent Coordinating Minister of Economic Affairs and Minister of Tourism and Environment, serving since July 2023 in the IX Constitutional Government of East Timor led by Prime Minister Xanana Gusmão.

== Early life and career ==
Lay was born in the then Portuguese Timor. In 1977, he was captured by the Indonesian army, and started living with Lieutenant General Dading Kalbuadi, commander of the Kopassus special forces who had infiltrated Portuguese Timor in the lead up to the Indonesian invasion of East Timor. Kalbuadi adopted Lay as his son, and Lay therefore took the general's family name.

As of early 1988, Lay was manager of CV Amigo, a company owned by General Kalbuadi that was operating in East Timor. At the beginning of the 1990s, Siti Hardiyanti Rukmana, also known as Tutut, eldest daughter of then Indonesian President Suharto, asked Lay, then chair of the East Timorese branch of the Jakarta-backed Indonesian National Youth Committee (Indonesian: Komite Nasional Pemuda Indonesia, KNPI), to chair one of her charities, the Tiara Foundation, in Dili.

According to George Junus Aditjondro, an Indonesian critic of the Suharto government, and in particular its activities concerning East Timor:

"The Tiara foundation recruited young Timorese to work in Indonesian factories owned by members and cronies of the Suharto family. This scheme, which initially enjoyed the blessing of Bishop [Carlos] Belo and then Governor [of East Timor] Mario Carrascalao, eventually left around 800 young underpaid Timorese stranded in Indonesia, with many young Timorese dying of unnatural causes in Indonesia and also some of them forming a military-backed gang in Jakarta."

TAPOL, a British NGO established to monitor human rights issues in Indonesia, reported in 1991 that the scheme was "... being encouraged by the military on the assumption that rebelliousness among young East Timorese is caused by unemployment and dissatisfaction with their lot," and that "Tutut's recruitment drive [had] the approval of BAIS, the Strategic Intelligence Agency, which [was] keen to reduce the political pressure in East Timor." However, the report went on to comment that the 'training' under the scheme was just a "two-week indoctrination course", that scheme participants were "low-paid", and that discontent with the scheme had caused tensions between local workers and Timorese in both Semarang and Bandung.

The Tiara Foundation scheme proved to be so controversial that Lay went abroad for a short period. Following his return, he was recruited by Domingos Soares, another collaborator with the Indonesians, to manage a provincial government-protected illicit gambling business at Tasitolu near Dili. He was soon fired, amidst allegations that he had embezzled large sums of money from the business. Bishop Belo then recruited him to manage the Don Carlos Foundation, one of the charities of the Roman Catholic Diocese of Dili. In that capacity, Lay travelled with the bishop to Australia shortly before the UN-supervised East Timorese independence referendum in 1999; at the end of that year, Asiaweek described him as an "aide" to Belo.

Meanwhile, Lay had also been involved in other activities. For a long time, he was an informant for the Combined Intelligence Task Force (Indonesian: Satuan Tugas Intelijen, SGI), the intelligence arm of Kopassus. In early 1994, TAPOL reported that Lay had travelled to Geneva with an Indonesian delegation that was negotiating with the UN Human Rights Commission over a possible chairman's consensus statement concerning East Timor. Lay's specific task, according to TAPOL, was "to keep watch over" Xavier do Amaral, who had briefly been the inaugural president of East Timor in 1975, and was part of the Indonesian delegation. The TAPOL report also asserted that Lay had accompanied Amaral to 'reconciliation talks' about East Timor held near London in December 1993.

Additionally, in 1998 Lay and two other Timorese businessmen, Oscar Lima and Ahmad Alkatiri, a younger brother of Mari Alkatiri, combined with Gerry Hand, a former minister in Australia's Hawke and Keating governments, to plan a 30- to 40-room hotel in Dili, and tender for a 400-room complex also in Dili. Hand had been, but was no longer, running several joint ventures on Christmas Island with Robby Sumampouw, a prominent Indonesian businessman. In mid-1998, columnist Brian Toohey wrote in the Australian Financial Review that:

"Hand attracted ... controversy by representing ... Sumampow, whom he has described as 'a very good friend'.

Although Hand [had] been a vocal critic of Indonesia's occupation of East Timor, Sumampow made a large part of his fortune by gaining a lucrative share of the former Portuguese colony's coffee, sandalwood, marble, hotel and retail industries. Sumpampow's access to East Timor was facilitated by his close association with General Benny Moerdani, who planned the 1975 [Indonesian] invasion [of the former colony]."

== Sports administrator career ==
=== Football ===
Lay has been described by The Oekusi Post as "a great football player". He was president of the Timor-Leste Football Federation (Portuguese: Federação Futebol Timor-Leste (FFTL)) from 2002 to 2007, and again from 2008 to 2018.

He also served as one of the vice presidents of the ASEAN Football Federation (AFF) from 2011 to 2015, as a member of the executive committee of the Asian Football Confederation (AFC) from 2015 to 2019, and again as a vice president of the AFF from 2019 to 2023.

Lay's terms of office as president of the FFTL, and also the interregnum between them, were marred by controversy. In 2007, the 13 FFTL voting members called an extraordinary congress, and purported to elect Pedro Carrascalão as president. Carrascalão alleged that the FFTL members had been forced to initiate the extraordinary congress because the FFTL had failed to hold a regular congress, including a presidential vote, on time. He also claimed that members were concerned about possible corruption. When Lay declared that the extraordinary congress was 'illegal', Carrascalão wrote to the AFC setting out his allegations against Lay and the FFTL, and asking the AFC to investigate the matter. He later travelled to Kuala Lumpur to meet with the AFC, which indicated that it would only recognise Lay as the FFTL's president. Carrascalão then decided to abandon his post.

In 2012, Lay became embroiled in a different controversy, when an internal audit of the AFC found that its president, Mohammed bin Hammam of Qatar, had routinely given tens of thousands of dollars in cash to federation presidents and their families, including US$50,000 to Lay, Bin Hammam was later banned from football for life, on the grounds that he had had "conflicts of interest" while AFC president. for "personal expenses".

Subsequently, in early 2015, ahead of the preliminary World Cup qualifiers, Lay declared, on the FIFA website, that "[i]t doesn't matter if Timor win, the most important thing is that football wins." In September of that year, however, two East Timorese were imprisoned in Singapore for attempting, with a key associate of notorious match fixer, Dan Tan, and an Indonesian referee, to fix Timor-Leste's opening football match at that year's South-East Asian Games. The following month, October 2015, the Palestinian Football Association formally requested that FIFA investigate the eligibility of seven Brazilian-born footballers who had played for Timor-Leste that month in a World Cup qualifying match. The request also triggered a parliamentary inquiry, and caused activists to take to the streets to demand change.

In the immediate aftermath of the request, the FFTL ceased using Brazilian players in the Timor-Leste national team. But when the federation resumed selecting the Brazilians in June 2016, the CFA disciplinary committee initiated an investigation. In December 2016, the Lusa News Agency reported that a decision on the issue was expected soon, as the investigation had concluded that Brazilian players had been registered for the Timor-Leste national team with false birth or baptism certificates.

On 20 January 2017, the disciplinary committee decided to exclude Timor-Leste from the 2023 AFC Asian Cup, fined the FFTL US$20,000. As the Brazilians had played in 29 games sanctioned by the CFA, the disciplinary committee also ruled that Timor-Leste forfeited those games, and fined the FFTL a further US$50,000 suspended for a two-year probationary period. The Brazilians had also played in seven games sanctioned by FIFA, and the disciplinary committee notified FIFA of its decision. Additionally, the committee banned the secretary general of the FFTL, Amândio de Araújo Sarmento, from football-related activities for three years and fined him US$9,000, and fined another FFTL official, Gelásio Da Silva Carvalho, US$3,000 for attempting to interfere with the investigation. The AFC statement announcing the committee's decision did not mention Lay.

In response to the decision, Nilton Gusmão, head of Liga Futebol Amadora (LFA), the country's domestic football competition, called for a full substitution of the FFTL board by the LFA board. According to Dili newspaper Jornal Independente, Lay had "... said that the [FFTL] board had ordered the falsifications." Later that year, Osório Costa, hitherto the vice president of the FFTL, became acting president; Lay's permanent replacement, Francisco Jerónimo, was elected on 24 February 2018.

=== Olympic sports ===
On 18 November 2013, Lay was elected President of the National Olympic Committee of Timor-Leste (Portuguese: Comitê Olímpico Nacional de Timor-Leste (CONTL)). He was reelected to that position on 16 January 2018, and again on 14 June 2022, in the latter case by acclamation at a general assembly attended by 21 national sporting federations.

== Political career ==
=== Early parliamentary career ===
Lay began his political career as a member of the Fretilin party. In 2001, he was elected as a Fretilin candidate to the Constituent Assembly of East Timor, from which the National Parliament emerged in 2002. During that legislative term, he was one of three members nominated by the Constituent Assembly to join the commission responsible for assessing the needs of the future National Parliament, and was later President of the Economics and Finance Commission of the National Parliament.

Lay was not included in the list of candidates for the 2007 parliamentary election. By 2012, he had switched his allegiance to the CNRT; he served as President of the CNRT's political campaigns committee for that year's parliamentary election, but once again was not in the list of candidates.

=== Minister of Tourism ===
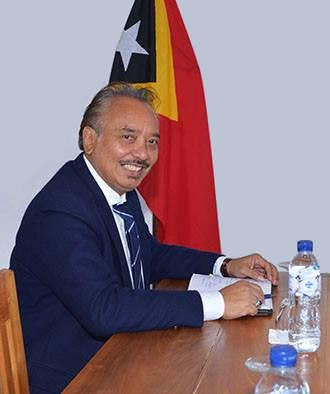
Official photo of Lay as Minister of Tourism, Arts and Culture in 2015

On 8 August 2012, Lay was sworn in as the Minister of Tourism in the V Constitutional Government led by Prime Minister Xanana Gusmão. When that Constitutional Government was replaced on 16 February 2015 by the VI Constitutional Government led by new Prime Minister Rui Maria de Araújo, Lay continued as a minister, under the new designation Minister of Tourism, Arts and Culture.

In 2017, Lay defeated the incumbent Secretary General of the CNRT, Dionísio Babo Soares, in an election for that post at the party congress.

In that year's parliamentary election, Lay returned to the National Parliament at #5 on the CNRT list, but he resigned on 6 September 2017, the second day of the session. With the CNRT going into opposition after the election, Lay also lost his ministerial post upon formation of the VI Constitutional Government on 15 September 2017. One of his replacements, Manuel Vong, was sworn in as Minister of Tourism; the other, Fernando Hanjam, became Minister of Education and Culture.

=== Political controversies ===
In 2018, the National Parliament was dissolved early. In the elections that followed, Lay was again elected to the parliament, this time in 4th place on the list of the Alliance for Change and Progress (AMP), of which the CNRT was part. During the formation of the VIII Constitutional Government, Lay was nominated for appointment as Minister for Trade, Industry, Environment and Tourism. However, President Francisco Guterres rejected that nomination and 10 others, in Lay's case because he had allegedly been involved in a corruption scandal.

The president's rejection of the ministerial nominations created a deadlock between Timor-Leste's two main political parties, the CNRT and Fretilin. In August 2018, the CNRT called for Guterres to be impeached if he did not approve the nominations "within 10 days", but Guterres, who was also president of Fretilin, was unmoved.

At the start of the following year, 2019, Lay and another rejected ministerial nominee, Sérgio Lobo, were overseas when they received notifications to attend court hearings, and therefore did not attend the hearings. Speaking in Parliament, Duarte Nunes, leader of the CNRT parliamentary group, explained why Lay had not attended the court hearing, and said that the party "guaranteed" that he would attend the next hearing. In reply, Gilman Exposto dos Santos, a member of parliament representing the Timorese Democratic Union (Portuguese: União Democrática Timorense (UDT)), asserted that members of the government had a duty to be responsible in a court of law for their actions. Fretilin responded by expressing concern that Timor-Leste did not have any extradition treaties with any country. Meanwhile, the CNRT maintained its position that its ministerial nominees were innocent until proven guilty, and Guterres repeatedly called for new nominations.

In late February 2019, Lay returned to the parliament, as his nomination for the ministry had been rejected. Speaking in parliament after his return, Lay confirmed that he had received three summonses from the High Court, but had not attended the court hearings, as he had been receiving medical treatment in Singapore. He also denied being present in parliament to gain legal immunity, and insisted that he would cooperate with the court. The legal proceedings related to allegations of corruption while he had been serving as Minister of Tourism, Arts and Culture, and were still only at an investigation stage. During a meeting with Guterres on the Friday of that week, the President of the National Parliament, Arão Noé, said that the parliament would "only" discuss whether to revoke Lay's legal immunity if the High Court sent out another summons for Lay to appear.

The Commander of the Timor Leste Defence Force, Lere Anan Timur, then intervened. In a statement, made from the office of the president, for which the East Timor Law & Justice Bulletin later heavily criticised him as illegitimately interfering in civil political processes, he said that the parliament should have waited until the High Court had resolved the corruption proceedings against Lay before allowing him to resume his membership. The following day, Lay was seen leaving Timor-Leste on a VIP aircraft; that event prompted Jornal Independente to observe that "... commentators have suggested that Lay's behaviour sets a dangerous precedent for accepted behaviour of national leaders."

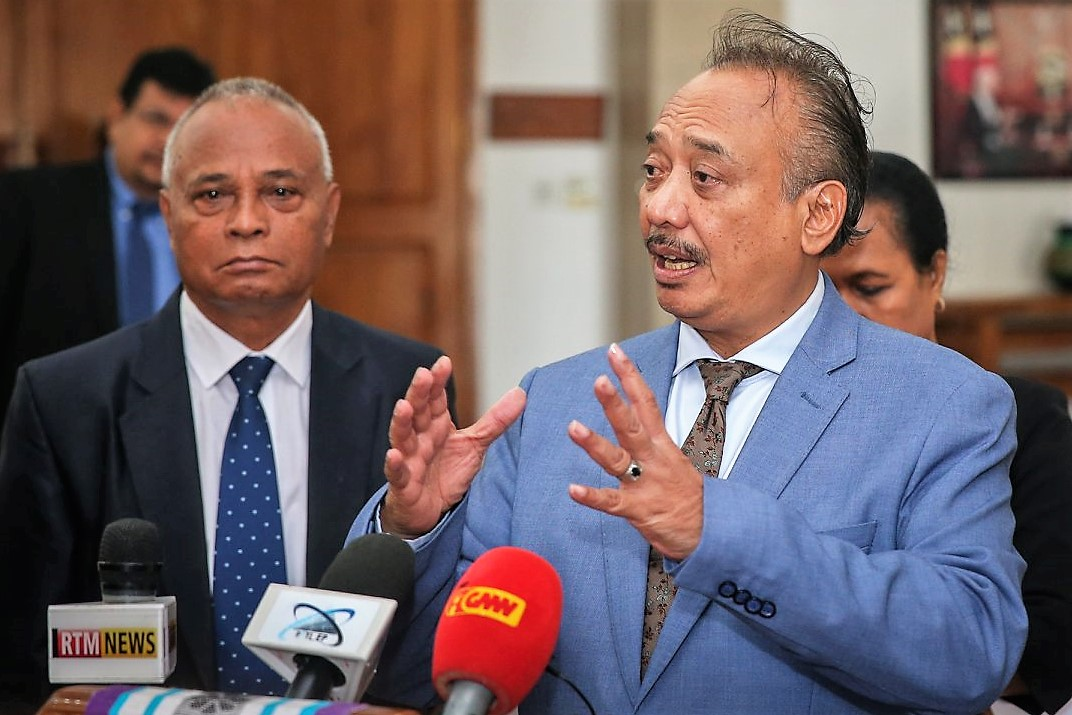
Lay during a media interview in 2020

On 18 March 2019, the Public Prosecutor sent a notification letter to the parliament calling for a revocation of Lay's legal immunity. The letter was signed as received by Carmelita Moniz, chair of the parliament's Committee on Constitutional Affairs and Justice (Committee A), and sent to Arão Noé. However, as noted by Fretilin member Antoninho Bianco in an address to parliament more than a month later, no further action was taken on the letter. In May 2021, Lay moved to Australia to undergo medical treatment that caused him to miss another court hearing. He returned to Timor-Leste in February 2022 and received another court summons, with which, he said through a spokesman, he would comply.

Meanwhile, in January 2022, former President José Ramos-Horta came out of retirement to stand as a candidate in that year's presidential election, as he considered that Guterres had violated the constitution. He stated that in the event of winning the presidential election, he would potentially dissolve parliament and call for new elections. The CNRT had decided to support him on the basis that, amongst other things, he "..., if elected, must restore constitutional order and exercise constitutional powers and dissolve parliament and call early elections." In the runoff between the two leading candidates, Ramos-Horta defeated Guterres with 62.1% of the total votes cast. However, the CNRT subsequently changed its strategy on whether it required Ramos-Horta to dissolve parliament and call early elections; Lay, in his capacity as CNRT secretary general, announced the change in strategy to reporters at a party meeting held in June 2022.

=== Deputy Prime Minister ===
In the 2023 parliamentary election, Lay was the 2nd placed candidate on the CNRT list, and was elected once again to the National Parliament. The CNRT won the election, and its victory was attributed by The Oekusi Post to hard work by Lay, the CNRT's party president Xanana Gusmão, and others, in effectively conveying the party's message or political slogan of "Human Fraternity" (Portuguese: Fraternidade Humana). Lay was involved in the post-election negotiations between the CNRT and the Democratic Party (PD) over the formation of a IX Constitutional Government as a coalition between the two parties. On 1 July 2023, he was sworn in as Deputy Prime Minister, Coordinating Minister of Economic Affairs, and Minister of Tourism and Environment in the IX Constitutional Government, and therefore gave up his parliamentary seat.

Also in July 2023, Lay told a news outlet based in Belu, an Indonesian regency that shares a border with East Timor, that the new government would continue striving to develop infrastructure in all regionsm with a view to supporting sustainable economic growth. "Establishing a new country is not easy, but we are trying to continue building," he said. During the remaining months of 2023, he made official visits to Cambodia and Malaysia, and attended a working party meeting of the World Trade Organization (WTO) in Geneva, at which he, as the newly appointed Chief Negotiator for Timor-Leste's accession to the WTO, indicated a "strong personal commitment" to leading East Timor through the final steps of that process.

Additionally, at ceremonies held in Bandar Seri Begawan, Brunei, and Dili, respectively, in November 2023, Lay signed a Memorandum of Understanding (MoU) with the Sultan of Brunei Darussalam, Hassanal Bolkiah, for a program to send workers from Timor-Leste to Brunei, and an MoU with five Chinese companies for donations to be made to Timor-Leste to a total value he said was estimated at around US$300 million.

In February 2024, at the WTO's 13th ministerial meeting in Abu Dhabi, Lay signed the Protocol of the Accession of Timor-Leste to the WTO, and thereby indicated that Timor-Leste accepted the "accessions package" subject to ratification in its national parliament. In April 2024, Lay launched the Timor-Leste Trade Information Portal, aimed at making import and export easier and less costly. At the 6th Ministerial Conference of Forum Macao in Macau later that month, he signed the Forum's Action Plan for Economic and Trade Cooperation (2024–2027); in an address to the conference, he also highlighted the forum's "important role" in facilitating cooperation between China and Portuguese-speaking countries in relation to infrastructure projects. The following month, May 2024, at the Ministry of Finance's annual Development Partners Meeting, Lay presided over a technical discussion on Timor-Lest's economic development sector, during which he outlined the government's priorities in key productive sectors of the economy, and identified the major challenges the government considered those sectors were facing.

In July 2024, in Geneva, Lay completed the process of Timor-Leste's accession to the WTO, by submitting to the WTO its Protocol of Accession and Instrument of Acceptance of the Fisheries Subsidy Agreement. At the end of that month, in Beijing, he signed an MoU with the People's Republic of China focused on strengthening investment cooperation in the digital economy and promoting green development, along with an additional agreement with the China International Development Cooperation Agency (CIDCA) to advance infrastructure projects in Timor-Leste. In October 2024, during an official visit by Xanana Gusmão and several of his ministers to Lisbon, Lay signed a cooperation agreement to develop the Revive programme for the support of high value historic public properties in Timor-Leste.

At the 28th ASEAN Labour Ministers Meeting in Singapore in October 2024, Lay represented Timor-Leste, including by giving a speech in which he stressed the importance of regional cooperation in facing global changes in the labour market, and signaled Timor-Leste's commitment to collaborating with ASEAN countries to formulate labour policies promoting inclusive development and well-being of citizens. He also met with Singapore's Minister for Foreign Affairs, Vivian Balakrishnan, to discuss Timor-Leste's integration process into ASEAN. The following month, he gave the welcoming speech at the inaugural Timor-Leste Tourism Investment Forum held in Dili. In December 2024, he represented Timor-Leste at the International Forum on Soil and Water 2024 in Bangkok. In his speech at the opening session, he drew attention to Timor-Leste's commitment to the promotion of sustainable agricultural practices, improvement of soil productivity and implementation of community-based water management.

== Personal life ==
Lay is a member of East Timor's small ethnic Chinese community. His brother, Pedro Lay, was Minister of Infrastructure from 2007 to 2012, and Minister of Transport and Communications between 2012 and 2015.
