= Minister of Tourism, Trade and Industry (Timor-Leste) =

East Timorese government minister

- Ministro do Turismo, Comércio e Indústria (Portuguese); Ministru Turizmu, Komérsiu no Indústria (Tetum)
- Coat of Arms of Timor-Leste

- Flag of Timor-Leste

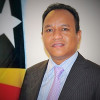
- Incumbent; Filipus Nino Pereira since 1 July 2023
- Ministry of Tourism, Trade and Industry
- Style: Minister; (informal); His Excellency; (formal, diplomatic)
- Member of: Constitutional Government
- Reports to: Prime Minister
- Appointer: President of Timor-Leste (following proposal by the Prime Minister of Timor-Leste)
- Inaugural holder: Gil da Costa Alves
- Formation: 2007
- Website: Ministry of Tourism, Trade and Industry

The Minister of Tourism, Trade and Industry (Portuguese: Ministro do Turismo, Comércio e Indústria, Tetum: Ministru Turizmu, Komérsiu no Indústria) is a senior member of the Constitutional Government of Timor-Leste heading the Ministry of Tourism, Trade and Industry.

== Functions ==
Under the Constitution of Timor-Leste, the Minister has the power and the duty:

1. to implement the policy defined for the Ministry of Tourism, Trade and Industry;
2. to ensure relations between the Government and the other organs of the State in the area of responsibility of the Ministry.

Where the Minister is in charge of the subject matter of a government statute, the Minister is also required, together with the Prime Minister, to sign the statute.

== Incumbent ==
The incumbent Minister of Commerce and Industry is Filipus Nino Pereira.

== List of ministers ==
The following individuals have been appointed as the minister:

No.	Party	Minister	Portrait	Title	Government (Prime Minister)	Term start	Term end	Term in office
1	ASDT	Gil Alves		Minister of Tourism, Commerce and Industry	IV Constitutional (Gusmão)	8 August 2007	8 August 2012	5 years, 0 days
2 (a)	PD	António da Conceição		Minister of Commerce, Industry and Environment	V Constitutional (Gusmão)	8 August 2012	16 February 2015	3 years, 2 days
2 (a)	PD	António da Conceição		Minister of Commerce, Industry and Environment	VI Constitutional (Araújo)	16 February 2015	10 August 2015	3 years, 2 days
3 (a)	PD	Constâncio da Conceição Pinto		Minister of Commerce, Industry and Environment	VI Constitutional (Araújo)	10 August 2015	15 September 2017	2 years, 36 days
(2 (a))	PD	António da Conceição		Minister for Commerce and Industry	VII Constitutional (Alkatiri)	15 September 2017	22 June 2018	280 days
2 (b)	CNRT	Francisco Kalbuadi Lay		Minister of Tourism	V Constitutional (Gusmão)	8 August 2012	16 February 2015	5 years, 38 days
2 (b)	CNRT	Francisco Kalbuadi Lay		Minister of Tourism, Arts and Culture	VI Constitutional (Araújo)	16 February 2015	15 September 2017	5 years, 38 days
3 (b)	Independent	Manuel Florêncio da Canossa Vong		Minister of Tourism	VII Constitutional (Alkatiri)	15 September 2017	22 June 2018	280 days
(acting)	CNRT	Hermenegildo Ágio Pereira		Minister of Tourism, Trade and Industry	VIII Constitutional (Ruak)	22 June 2018	12 May 2020	1 year, 325 days
4	Fretilin	José Lucas do Carmo da Silva		Minister of Tourism, Trade and Industry	VIII Constitutional (Ruak) (restructured)	24 June 2020	1 July 2023	3 years, 7 days
5 (b)	PD	Filipus Nino Pereira		Minister of Commerce and Industry	IX Constitutional (Gusmão)	1 July 2023	Incumbent	3 years, 69 days
