= Lionel Blair =

English TV entertainer and dancer (1928–2021)

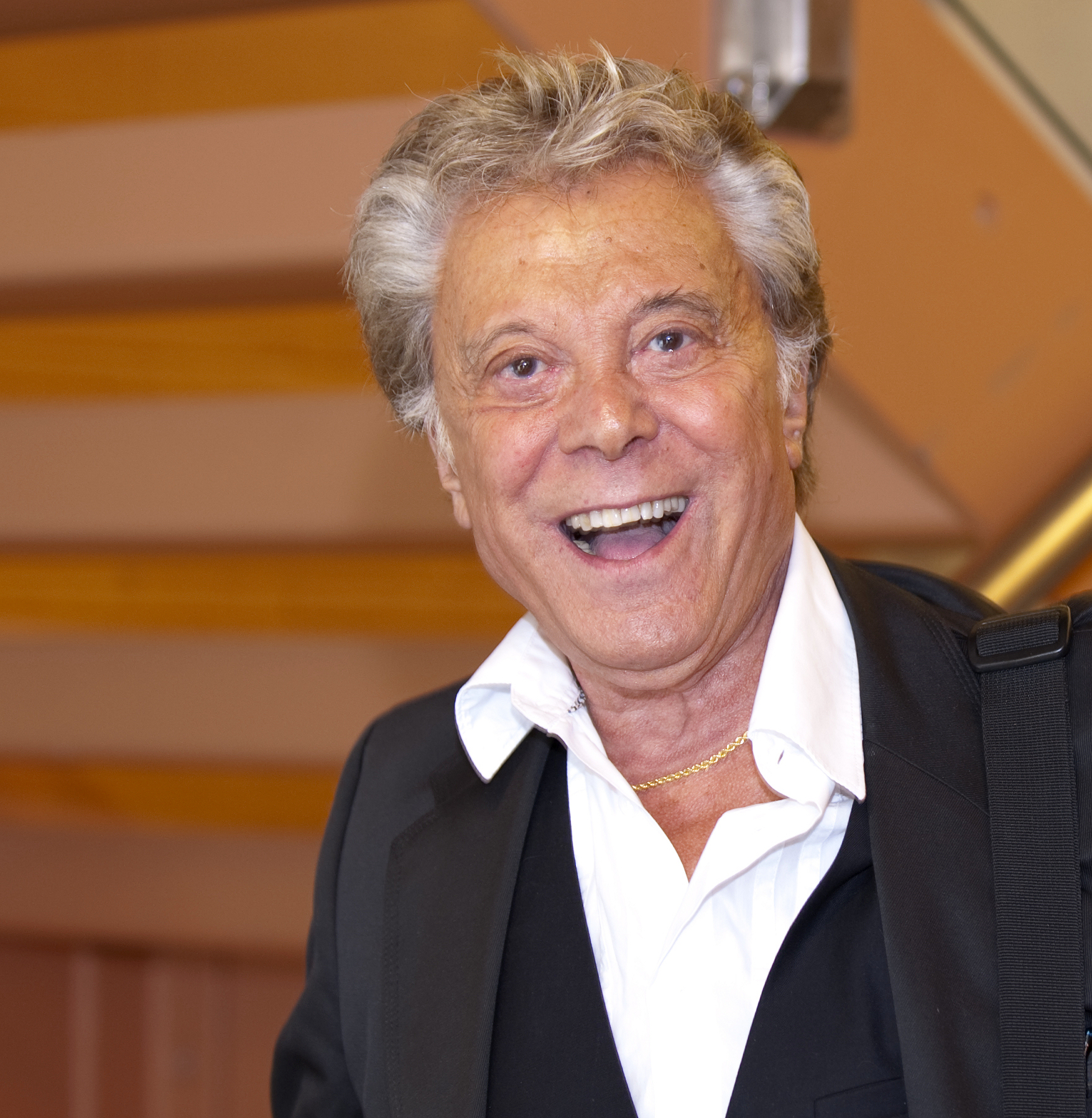
- Blair in 2010
- Born: Henry Lionel Ogus; 12 December 1928; Montreal, Quebec, Canada
- Died: 4 November 2021 (aged 92)
- Occupations: Actor; choreographer; dancer; television presenter
- Years active: 1944–2021
- Spouse: Susan Davis (m. 1967)
- Children: 3
- Relatives: Joyce Blair (sister)

Lionel Blair (born Henry Lionel Ogus; 12 December 1928 – 4 November 2021) was a British actor, choreographer, dancer, and television presenter. From the late 1960s until the early 1980s, he made regular appearances as a dancer and entertainer on British television. He also presented the quiz programme Name That Tune, and was a team captain on the televised charades gameshow Give Us a Clue.

== Early life ==
Henry Lionel Ogus was born in Montreal, Quebec, Canada. He was born to Jewish parents, Myer Ogus and Debora "Della" Greenbaum. His father, a barber, emigrated from Russia to Canada to start a new life, and his wife joined him shortly afterwards. Blair came to Britain when he was two years old, and the family settled at Stamford Hill in north London, where his father continued to work as a barber. Due to the anti-semitism of the time, his father changed the family name to Blair.

Blair's first public performances were with his sister Joyce (1932–2006) in the Manor House Underground station air raid shelters and on the trains of the Piccadilly line during the air raids of the Second World War. During the Blitz, mother and children were evacuated to Oxford, but when they saw a German plane crash from the back garden, the family decided they might as well be in London. When Blair was thirteen, his father died after what should have been a routine operation on an ulcer. After this, Blair became the breadwinner for the family and took to the stage. He started out with girlish parts, as his voice had not yet broken. Blair was singled out in several reviews for his performance as one of the children in a touring performance of the play Watch on the Rhine during 1943, and attended the Royal Shakespeare Theatre in Stratford in 1944. In 1946, he joined a touring company called the Savoy Players.

Blair eventually rekindled his passion for musical theatre and began working in the West End. He gave up acting for dancing in 1947, although he subsequently appeared in a national tour of Who Killed Agatha Christie. He took his stage name around this time, later changing it by deed poll just before he married in 1967; his sister also decided to use the same surname professionally. Before his break into television, Blair was the juvenile lead in The Five Past Eight Show at the Alhambra Theatre, Glasgow, acting as "straight man" to many Scottish comedians, including Jimmy Logan and Rikki Fulton. Blair later said: "They were very funny, but they were also brilliant actors, and I learnt everything I needed to from them." Blair also choreographed shows at the theatre.

== Career ==
Blair came to the fore in the 1960s when, with his dance troupe, he appeared on television variety programmes. He also appeared in the films The Limping Man (1953), The World of Suzie Wong (1960), The Cool Mikado (1963), The Beauty Jungle (1964), A Hard Day's Night (1964), Maroc 7 (1967) and Absolute Beginners (1986), cameoed in an episode of The Persuaders!, and appeared in television comedy, including the short film, The Plank. In addition, he choreographed films such as Jazz Boat (1960), in which he made an uncredited appearance, and The Magic Christian (1969). He appeared in Miss World 1969 and 1970 at the Royal Albert Hall in London.

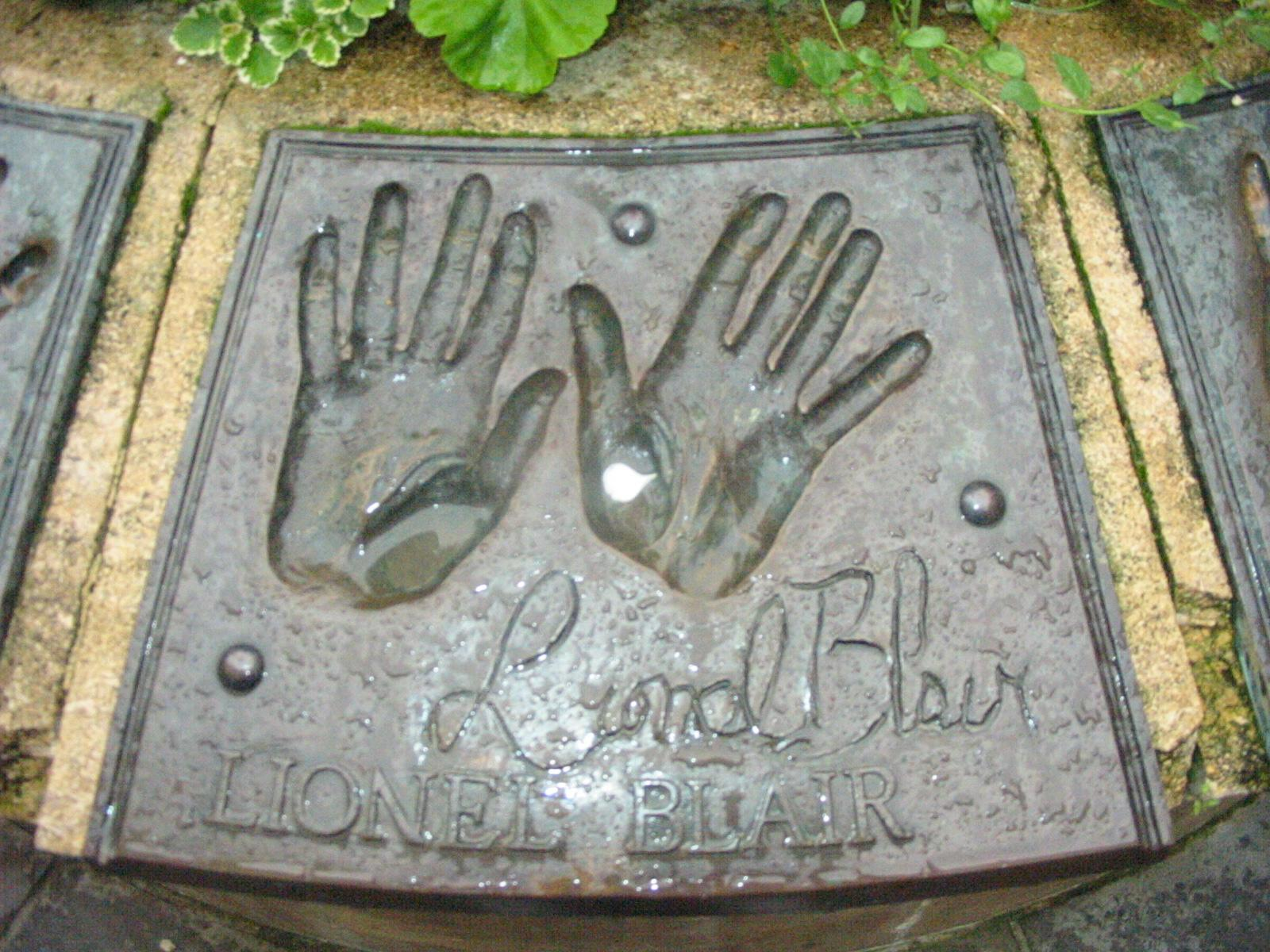
Blair's handprints in Bath, UK (2004)

Blair was one of the team captains on the game show Give Us a Clue from 1979 until the early 1990s, and was the second presenter of the British version of Name That Tune in the 1980s. He published his autobiography Stagestruck in 1985. Until 2005, he appeared extensively in pantomime.

In 2003, Blair released his first full-length album as a singer, in a tribute to Fred Astaire titled Blair Sings Astaire, together with the Jive Aces. In 2005, he took part in the Channel Five reality series, The Farm. In 2009, twenty-one years after Chris Rea's "Driving Home for Christmas" was first released, Blair starred in an original video for the song that was made in aid of Shelter. In 2012, he was cast in the film version of Ray Cooney's farce Run for Your Wife. In 2014, he entered the Celebrity Big Brother house with Made in Chelsea media personality Ollie Locke, after being handcuffed together as part of a task set by Big Brother. Aged 85 at the time of entering the house, Blair was the show's oldest ever housemate, and remains the oldest person to compete in any version of the Big Brother franchise. He was the third housemate to be evicted.

Blair continued to work as an actor, having filmed an episode of BBC One's medical soap opera Doctors in 2014. In 2017, Blair was one of the celebrities appearing in the second series of the BBC reality series The Real Marigold Hotel. In 2018, he joined 26 other celebrities to perform "Rock with Rudolph", recorded in aid of Great Ormond Street Hospital.

== Personal life ==
Blair married Susan Davis at Kensington Register Office on 21 March 1967, with Bernie Winters as best man. They had three children and three grandchildren and celebrated their 50th wedding anniversary on 21 March 2017. The couple lived in Banstead, Surrey.

Blair, and his incorrectly assumed homosexuality, was a recurring joke on the long-running BBC Radio 4 series I'm Sorry I Haven't a Clue. The constant jibes upset his family and his children were bullied at school as a result. References to Blair have been dropped from the series since his death.

In 2006, Blair and comedian Alan Carr helped save a man about to fall from a pier in Blackpool. The man was holding on by his fingers.

Blair died on the morning of 4 November 2021, at the age of 92.

== Books ==
- Blair, Lionel (1985). Stage Struck. Weidenfeld & Nicolson. ISBN 9780297785521.
