= Taquipirenda, Bolivia =

Taquipirenda
- Industrial facility
- Location within Bolivia
- Coordinates: 20°19′50″S 63°08′30″W
- Department: Santa Cruz Department
- Province: Cordillera Province
- Elevation: 720 m (2,370 ft)
- Time zone: UTC-4 (BOT)
- Sources: Google Maps

Taquipirenda is a gas pipeline station in the Santa Cruz Department of Bolivia.

The facility is served by Taquipirenda Airport.
