= Ministry of Tourism, Trade and Industry (Timor-Leste) =

Ministry in the government of Timor-Leste

- Ministério do Turismo, Comércio e Indústria (Portuguese); Ministériu Turizmu, Komérsiu no Indústria (Tetum)
- Coat of Arms of Timor-Leste

Ministry overview
- Formed: 1975 (Economics); 2007 (Tourism)
- Jurisdiction: Government of Timor-Leste
- Headquarters: Av. Dom Boaventura No. 16, Serviços Fomento, Mandarin, Dili; 8°33′18″S 125°34′2″E
- Minister responsible: Filipus Nino Pereira, Minister of Commerce and Industry
- Website: Ministry of Tourism, Trade and Industry
- Agency ID: MTCI
- Ministry logo
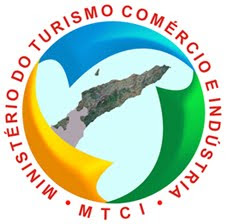

The Ministry of Tourism, Trade and Industry (MTCI; Portuguese: Ministério do Turismo, Comércio e Indústria, Tetum: Ministériu Turizmu, Komérsiu no Indústria) is the government department of Timor-Leste accountable for tourism, trade, industry and related matters.

== Functions ==
The Ministry is responsible for the design, implementation, coordination and evaluation of policy for the areas of tourism, and commercial and industrial economic activities.

== Minister ==
The incumbent Minister of Commerce and Industry is Filipus Nino Pereira.

== See also ==
- List of tourism ministries
- List of trade and industry ministries
- Politics of Timor-Leste
