= Joaquim Amaral =

East Timorese politician and diplomat

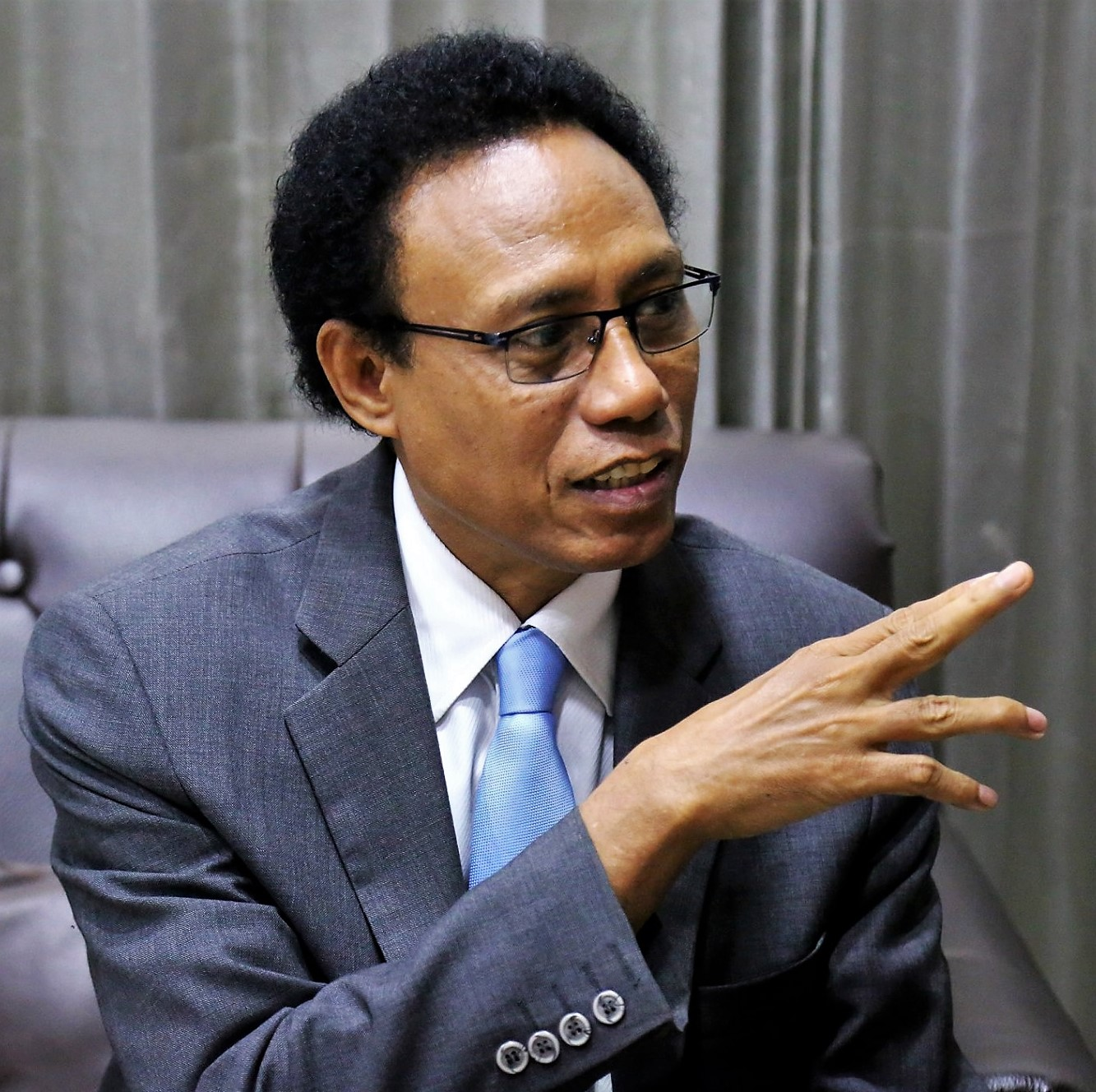
- Amaral in 2020

Coordinating Minister of Economic Affairs
- In office 24 June 2020 – 1 July 2023
- Prime Minister: Taur Matan Ruak
- Preceded by: Office established
- Succeeded by: Francisco Kalbuadi Lay

East Timorese Ambassador to Thailand
- In office November 2015 – January 2020

Member of the National Parliament
- In office 2001–2012

Personal details
- Born: 17 July 1968 (age 57): Viqueque, Portuguese Timor; (now East Timor)
- Party: Fretilin

Joaquim Amaral (born 17 July 1968) is an East Timorese politician and diplomat, and a member of the Fretilin political party.

From June 2020 to July 2023, he was the Coordinating Minister of Economic Affairs, serving in the VIII Constitutional Government of East Timor led by Prime Minister Taur Matan Ruak.

Previously, Amaral was East Timorese Ambassador to Thailand, and a Member of the National Parliament of East Timor.

== Early life and career ==
Amaral was born in Viqueque, Portuguese Timor (now East Timor), and has a degree in agriculture. He has been Secretary-General of the Associação das Arquitetos de Timor-Leste (ART), Director of the Forte Group, and Administrator of Funuman PT Ltd.

== Political career ==
Amaral began his political career at the United Nations Transitional Administration in East Timor (UNTAET), for which he worked from 1999 until 20 May 2002, when East Timor's independence was restored. In 2001, he was elected as a Fretilin candidate to the Constituent Assembly of East Timor, from which the National Parliament emerged in 2002. During the 2001–2007 Parliamentary term, he was a member of the Committee for Infrastructure (Committee G).

At the next Parliamentary elections in 2007, Amaral was not re-elected, but on 21 August 2007, one month after the first session of Parliament, he succeeded one of the Fretilin candidates who had not taken up his or her seat. In Amaral's second legislative period, he was a member of the Committee for Infrastructure and Social Facilities (Committee G).

In November 2015, Amaral was appointed as East Timor's ambassador to Thailand, and also as the Permanent Representative of East Timor to the United Nations Economic and Social Commission for Asia and the Pacific (ESCAP), which is based in Bangkok. He served in those offices until 2020.

Following a change in the governing coalition, and the admission of Fretilin to the VIII Constitutional Government, Amaral was sworn in as Coordinating Minister of Economic Affairs on 24 June 2020. In that capacity, he was the official in charge of leading the negotiations for East Timor to become a member of the World Trade Organization (WTO).

After being appointed as Coordinating Minister, Amaral also sought to diversify East Timor's economy beyond its strong dependence upon oil and gas, by promoting other industries including mining, agriculture, fisheries and tourism.

Amaral's tenure as Minister ended when the IX Constitutional Government took office on 1 July 2023. He was succeeded by Francisco Kalbuadi Lay.
