= Carmel Budiardjo =

British activist and lecturer (1925–2021)

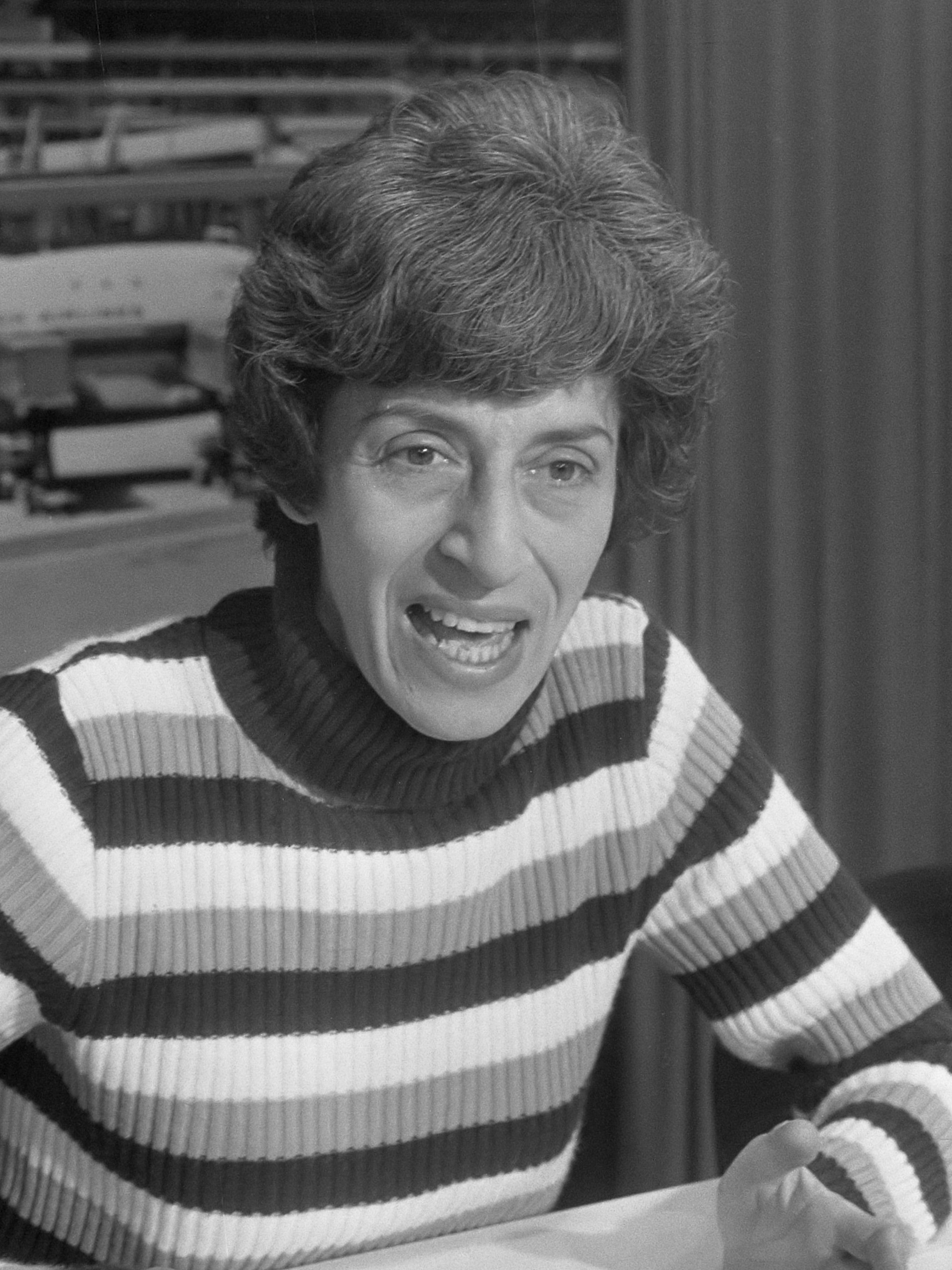
- Budiardjo in 1973
- Born: Carmel Brickman; 18 June 1925; London, England
- Died: 10 July 2021 (aged 96); London, England
- Education: London School of Economics; University of Indonesia
- Occupations: Activist, lecturer, teacher, government employee
- Known for: Founder of Tapol
- Spouse: Suwondo Budiardjo (m. 1950)
- Children: 2, including Tari Lang
- Awards: Right Livelihood Award (1995)

Carmel Budiardjo (née Brickman; 18 June 1925 – 10 July 2021) was an English human rights activist, lecturer, and author. She was the founder of the non-governmental organisation Tapol. Budiardjo was known for campaigning for the awareness of war crimes and human rights abuses in Indonesia and East Timor. For her activism, she was awarded the Right Livelihood Award in 1995.

== Early life ==
She came from a Jewish family in London, whose anti-fascist beliefs influenced her left-wing politics. She received a bachelor's degree in Economics in 1946 from the London School of Economics, where she became active in the National Union of Students. While working in Prague for the International Union of Students, she met Suwondo 'Bud' Budiardjo, an Indonesian government official whom she married in 1950. The couple moved to Indonesia in 1951, and she became an Indonesian citizen in 1954.

== Early career ==
Budiardjo worked first as a translator for Antara, the Indonesian news agency, then in economic research for the Ministry of Foreign Affairs, later studying at the University of Indonesia's School of Economics and then lecturing at Padjadjaran University in Bandung and Res Publica (now Trisakti) University in Jakarta.

Prior her arrest, Carmel lived a comfortable life with her husband and two children in Teuku Umar street, an elite area in Central Jakarta.

== Activism ==
After General Suharto seized power in 1966, her husband became a political prisoner, spending 12 years in jail. Carmel lost her job in the ministry and had to teach English to support her family. She was eventually arrested, and later imprisoned in 1968 after her colleague leaked her sympathetic view toward the communists.

Sometime after her arrest, her eldest daughter had to sell yoghurt to support the family (other family members lived in the same house, including an aunt). Carmel's son also helped by selling es lilin (ice pop). Australian scholar Herb Feith and his wife also helped Carmel's children during that difficult period.

Carmel was freed in 1970, but four months later she was re-arrested. She regained her British citizenship when she was jailed in Jakarta, thanks to the help of a British law firm contacted by her daughter who moved to London in 1969, and Carmel was able to be freed in 1971 and returned to London.

Upon returning she founded Tapol to campaign for political prisoners in Indonesia, which took its name from the abbreviation of tahanan politik (political prisoner in Indonesian). The organisation expanded its activities, and was prominent in getting out information on military activity and human rights violations in East Timor, invaded and occupied by Indonesia in 1975, as well as West Papua and Aceh.

In 1978, Budiardjo's advocacy managed to free her husband Suwondo Budiardjo. He came to England and supported her wife's activism for some time, however they later divorced. Suwondo died in London in 1996 and he was buried in his hometown, Purworkerto.

The Tapol Bulletin was a major source of information about the human rights situation in Indonesia under the New Order. She was also the author of a number of books on human rights and politics in Indonesia. The organisation remains active, with Budiardjo still playing a very important part in its activities until her death.

In 1995, Budiardjo was awarded the Right Livelihood Award for her work, being nominated by the International Federation for East Timor. In England, Budiardjo was also a staunch supporter of the NHS.

== Death ==
Budiardjo died on 10 July 2021 in London at age 96. On 6 August 2021 Budiardjo was featured in the BBC Radio 4 obituary programme Last Word.

== Works ==
- Budiardjo, Carmel and Liem Soei Liong. The War Against East Timor. London: Zed Books, 1984. ISBN 0-86232-228-6.
- Budiardjo, Carmel. Surviving Indonesia's Gulag: A Western Woman Tells Her Story. London: Cassell, 1996. ISBN 0-304-33562-2.
