= Free Riau Movement =

Gerakan Riau Merdeka
- Leader: Tabrani Rab (until 2022)
- Founded: 15 March 1999
- Dissolved: c. 2022 (no longer active)
- Headquarters: Pekanbaru, Riau
- Ideology: Riau independence
- Religion: Islam

Party flag

The Free Riau Movement (Indonesian: Gerakan Riau Merdeka) or Riau Independence Movement, was a political movement in the province of Riau, Indonesia. It advocated for the independence of Riau from Indonesia, emphasizing local nationalism and self-determination. The movement was initiated by Prof. Dr. dr. Tabrani Rab, a Riau pulmonologist, researcher, and academic, and officially declared on 15 March 1999. Despite challenges, GRM continues to operate, with its headquarters in Pekanbaru, Riau. The ideology of the movement is rooted in Riau nationalism, reflecting a long-standing sentiment among certain groups in the region.

The movement's activities have been primarily concentrated in the Riau and Riau Islands. GRM has been a vocal advocate for the rights of the local population, particularly in terms of managing and benefiting from the region's rich natural resources. The movement has also been involved in various forms of social activism and has had a significant impact on the regional political discourse. However, the movement never really materialized into real independence-looking efforts and much like protest movement. Eventually, the movement died out due to lack of support and subsequent decentralization policies by post-Suharto Indonesian presidents. Prof. Tabrani Rab himself died in 2022, and no one continued the movement after his death. Despite that, disciples and followers of Prof. Tabrani Rab still existed.

This movement resurfaced in 2025, former state intelligence Sri Radjasa Chandra revealed information regarding a secret meeting, discussing the discourse of the movement to Riau independence held by a number of supporters of former Indonesian president's Joko Widodo. But the report later declared as hoax and baseless by local Riau Government.
