= Manuel Vong =

East Timorese university lecturer and politician

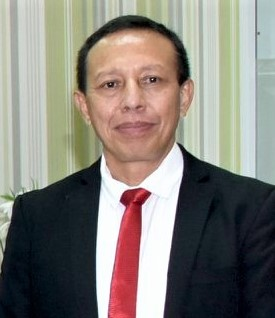
- Vong in 2020

Minister for Tourism
- In office 15 September 2017 – 22 June 2018
- Prime Minister: Mari Alkatiri
- Preceded by: Francisco Kalbuadi Lay
- Succeeded by: Ágio Pereira; (Acting Minister)

Personal details
- Born: 7 November 1962 (age 63) Dili, Portuguese Timor (now East Timor)

Manuel Florêncio da Canossa Vong (born 7 November 1962), also known as Lito Vong, is an East Timorese university lecturer and politician. In 2017–2018, he was Minister for Tourism in the short-lived VII Constitutional Government of East Timor.

== Early life and education ==
Vong was born in Dili, in the then Portuguese Timor. He comes from a family of farmers, and has five brothers and five sisters. His parents attached great importance to a good school education. From 1969 to 1974, he attended the elementary school of the Catholic Mission, then he went to school in Dili from 1974 to 1975. On 7 December 1975, the Indonesians landed in Dili at the start of their invasion of East Timor, and schooling was suspended.

The following year, 1976, Vong returned to his school in Dili; he completed eighth grade in 1977. Until 1981 he attended pre-secondary level schooling, and in 1984 he completed secondary level at St Joseph's High School (Portuguese: Colégio de São José) in Dili.

In 1989, Vong was awarded a bachelor's degree in public administration from the Akademi Pemerintahan Dalam Negeri (APDN) in Banjarbaru, South Kalimantan, Indonesia. Three years later, in 1992, he obtained a degree in political science from the Institut Ilmu Pemerintahan in Jakarta.

== Career ==
In 1991/1992, Vong served as head of the scholarship program for East Timorese students. Between March 1993 and April 1994, he was Administrator of the then Barique/Natarbora sub-district, and from 1994 to 1998 he served as Administrator of the then Manatuto sub-district. Between 2000 and 2002, he studied for a Master's degree in political science at the Gadjah Mada University in Yogyakarta, Indonesia.

Since 2002, Vong has worked in the School for Tourism and Hospitality at the Dili Institute of Technology (DIT). From 2002, he was a lecturer and Manager of the DIT, from 2007 he was Vice Rector, and from 2009 he served as internal auditor. Since January 2015, he has been Rector of the DIT.

In 2008, Vong was awarded a diploma from Victoria University, Melbourne, Australia. Between 2010 and 2014, he completed a doctorate in tourism at the Faculty of Economics, University of Algarve in Faro, Portugal.

On 13 October 2017, President Francisco Guterres appointed Vong as Minister of Tourism in the VII Constitutional Government; he was sworn in on 17 October 2017. His term of office as Minister ended upon the formation of the VIII Constitutional Government on 22 June 2018.
