= Tapol =

Non-governmental organisation monitoring human rights issues in Indonesia

Tapol is a British non-governmental organisation monitoring human rights issues in Indonesia. Tapol is an abbreviation of the Indonesian words for political prisoners (tahanan politik). Based in London, Tapol continues to monitor and report human right issues for Indonesia in subsequent presidential eras of Indonesia's history.

Tapol was established in 1973 by Carmel Budiardjo, a former political prisoner in Indonesia and member of Sukarno's "Old Order" government.

Tapol began its work as the Tapol Bulletin, a British-based bulletin that monitored the New Order government of Suharto's measures against alleged members of the Communist Party of Indonesia after the 1965-1966 crisis in Indonesia.

In 1995, Carmel Budiardjo was given the Right Livelihood Award "...for holding the Indonesian government accountable for its actions and upholding the universality of fundamental human rights."

== Funding ==
The assets of Tapol increased from £111,159 in 2012 to £136,881 in 2013.

== See also ==
- Carmel Budiardjo
