= The Zodiac Game =

UK game show

- Genre: Game show
- Created by: Ron Bareham; Laurence Barnett
- Presented by: Tom O'Connor
- Starring: Bernard Fitzwalter (1984); Russell Grant (1985)
- Country of origin: United Kingdom
- Original language: English
- No. of series: 2
- No. of episodes: 29

Production
- Running time: 30 minutes (inc. adverts)
- Production companies: Anglia in association with Hightimes Productions and GPA Films Ltd.

Original release
- Network: ITV
- Release: 6 January 1984 – 27 August 1985

The Zodiac Game is a British game show that aired on ITV from 6 January 1984 to 27 August 1985 and is hosted by Tom O'Connor with resident astrologer Bernard Fitzwalter for the first series before being replaced by Russell Grant for the second series.

== Format ==
The format of the game was a pair of contestants, one a celebrity and the other not, each answering questions about the other based on what the other's zodiac sign says they should answer. (For example, a gemini would never go into a bar and choose X drink). The resident astrologer would then explain the correct answer to the competitors and to the audience as well.

== Transmissions ==
Series	Start date	End date	Episodes
1	6 January 1984	20 April 1984	16
2	7 June 1985	27 August 1985	13
