= Crosswits =

British television game show (1985–1998)

- Genre: Game show
- Created by: Jerry Payne
- Presented by: Barry Cryer; Tom O'Connor
- Country of origin: United Kingdom
- Original language: English
- No. of series: 12
- No. of episodes: 435

Production
- Running time: 30 minutes (inc. adverts)
- Production companies: Tyne Tees in association with Cove Productions and Action Time

Original release
- Network: ITV
- Release: 3 September 1985 – 23 December 1998

Related
- The Cross-Wits (US version)

Crosswits is a British game show produced by Tyne Tees in association with Cove Productions and Action Time, and filmed from Tyne Tees' City Road studios in Newcastle upon Tyne. First shown on 3 September 1985, it was originally hosted by Barry Cryer for the first two series; comedian Tom O'Connor then took over from series 3 until the show ended on 23 December 1998. The show consisted of two members of the public competing against each other to solve simple crossword puzzles. A "celebrity" partner helped each player. The announcers for the show were generally Tyne Tees, as well as continuity announcers Judi Lines, Jonathan Morrell and Bill Steel.

== Gameplay ==
The teams consisted of two players (one celebrity and one contestant), solving words in a crossword puzzle (by virtue of clues), with six words to solve and with a clue word, all of which were clues to a keyword. Each correct answer kept control and earned one point per letter in the answer, plus a chance to solve the keyword for 10 bonus points. On the first two series, which were transmitted weekly, the teams played for pounds. Later in the run, teams always took turns whether they were right or wrong.

There were also special rounds in the game:

- Anagram round – the first letter of every answer in the crossword puzzle would make up the keyword.
- Mystery round – finding a keyword after one clue without assistance from a clue word would win the contestant a small prize, such as a cordless phone or a pocket TV.
- Song round – all clues were lyrics to a well-known song.

The team with the most points when time ran out won the game, and played the same Crossfire round as the American version. The other player received a dictionary and thesaurus.

=== Crossfire round ===
The winning team was shown one last crossword puzzle with 10 words, none of which were clues to a master puzzle. If they could solve all ten clues in 60 seconds or less, the player would win a holiday, or a gold pen and pencil set otherwise.

== Transmissions ==
Series	Episodes	Originally released		Recorded
Series	Episodes	First released	Last released	Recorded
1	13	3 September 1985	3 December 1985	1985
2	13	5 January 1987	30 March 1987	1986
3	24	27 October 1987	17 December 1987	1987
4	40	25 April 1988	17 June 1988	1988
5	45	15 May 1989	14 July 1989	1989
6	35	9 April 1990	25 May 1990	1990
7	40	29 April 1991	21 June 1991	1991
8	55	13 April 1992	26 June 1992	1992
9	25	17 May 1993	18 June 1993	1993
10	70	4 April 1994	8 July 1994	1994
11	40	21 October 1996	13 December 1996	1996
12	35	6 January 1998	23 December 1998	1997

=== Regional transmissions information ===
==== 1985 ====
The first series aired on Tuesday afternoons at 3 pm, apart from TVS who aired the series on Thursday afternoons at the same time.

==== Early 1987 ====
The second series aired on Monday evenings at 6:30 pm in the Tyne Tees region. The rest of the regions aired the series on Tuesday afternoons at 3 pm.

==== Late 1987 ====
The third series aired on Tuesday to Thursday afternoons at 2 pm, apart from TVS which aired the series on Monday afternoons at 3 pm, but did not air all the episodes, and Channel which aired the series on Monday, Wednesday, and Friday afternoons at 3 pm.

==== 1988–94 ====
From the fourth series up until the tenth series, the show aired on Monday to Friday mornings at 9:25 am, just after TV-am/GMTV had finished.

==== 1996 ====
The eleventh series aired on Monday to Friday afternoons but was not networked. Depending on the region, it aired at random times in certain areas.

- Carlton, Central, Tyne Tees, Westcountry and Yorkshire had shown the series at 1:25 pm.
- Ulster aired the episodes at 1:55 pm.
- Grampian put the shows out at 2:50 pm.
- Scottish aired the episodes at 2:20 pm, but only four times a week.
- Border and Granada aired the episodes at 5:10 pm most days.
- Anglia and Meridian aired the episodes on most days at 12:55 pm. Anglia continued to broadcast more episodes, finishing on 24 January 1997.
- HTV aired over half the episodes at 2:25 pm, but did not complete the run.

==== 1998 ====
The twelfth series aired on Tuesday to Thursday afternoons at 1:50 pm for the first 32 episodes from 6 January to 19 March. The last three episodes aired from 21 to 23 December 1998.
