= Taquipirenda Airport =

Airport in Bolivia

- IATA: none; ICAO: SLTA

Summary
- Airport type: Public
- Serves: Taquipirenda
- Elevation AMSL: 2,340 ft / 713 m
- Coordinates: 20°20′20″S 63°08′25″W

Map
- Location of Taquipirenda Airport in Bolivia

Runways
Direction	Length		Surface
Direction	m	ft	Surface
18/36	1,570	5,151	Grass
- Source: Landings.com Google Maps GCM

Taquipirenda Airport (ICAO: SLTA) is a public-use airstrip serving the Taquipirenda gas pipeline facility in the Santa Cruz Department of Bolivia.

== See also ==
- Transport in Bolivia
- List of airports in Bolivia
