= Murder of Ava White =

2021 murder in Liverpool, United Kingdom

Coordinates: 53.4045°N 2.9838°W

Portrait of Ava White published by Merseyside Police after the sentencing of her murderer

Ava White was a 12-year-old British girl who was murdered by 14-year-old Harry Gilbertson on 25 November 2021, in the English city of Liverpool. She was murdered after an argument over a Snapchat video. Gilbertson was not named, for legal reasons, until 2025.

== Background ==
Ava Martin White was born in January 2009 to Robert and Leanne White. She was a student of Notre Dame Catholic College in Everton.

== Murder ==
On 25 November 2021, Ava and her friends, aged between 11 and 15, were playing and sharing alcohol near the Royal Court Theatre, Liverpool while waiting for the switching on of the Christmas lights.

Harry Gilbertson, aged 14, and his friends, aged between 13 and 15, started filming them with intent to share it on Snapchat. Ava asked them to stop and delete the recording. The unarmed girls ran towards the group of boys and the 14-year-old boy stabbed her in the neck with a knife, laughed, and ran away.

The teenage boy and his friends shortly fled the scene, and disposed of evidence before entering a nearby corner shop and purchasing butter, which Ava’s killer said was "to use on crumpets". The mother of the boy was contacted by police shortly after the stabbing of Ava. She quickly texted the boy to inform him that the police were searching for him and he replied shortly after to tell her that he was "Not coming home, not going the cells". Four teenage boys were arrested by police in Toxteth later that night.

Ava was taken to Alder Hey Children's Hospital but was pronounced dead at 10:16 pm.

On 28 November 2021, the boy was charged with the murder of Ava White and was also charged with carrying a blade. He was remanded into custody and the three other boys were released without charge.

Following a two-week trial at Liverpool Crown Court, the boy, who had initially denied murdering Ava by saying it was another boy, later claimed to have acted in self-defence. The court was shown CCTV footage, police recorded interviews were presented and a 20-second clip showing the stabbing were played during the trial of the boy. Her friends also testified. Among the footage presented in court is of him and a friend throwing away his coat and knife as they ran from the scene of the murder.

He was found guilty of murder and was sentenced to life imprisonment with a minimum term of 13 years.

Ava was murdered on the International Day for the Elimination of Violence against Women. She is believed to be the youngest victim of knife violence in the UK since Damilola Taylor in 2000.

== Memorial ==
- On 2 December 2021, Everton F.C. and Liverpool F.C. fans joined in a round of applause as a banner with an anti-knives message was displayed during the game.
- On 23 January 2022, a crowd bringing along balloons of the figure 13 or the letter A gathered outside Anfield stadium and sang songs in memory of Ava.

== See also ==
- Killing of Damilola Taylor
