= José Lucas da Silva =

East Timorese politician, marine biologist and academic

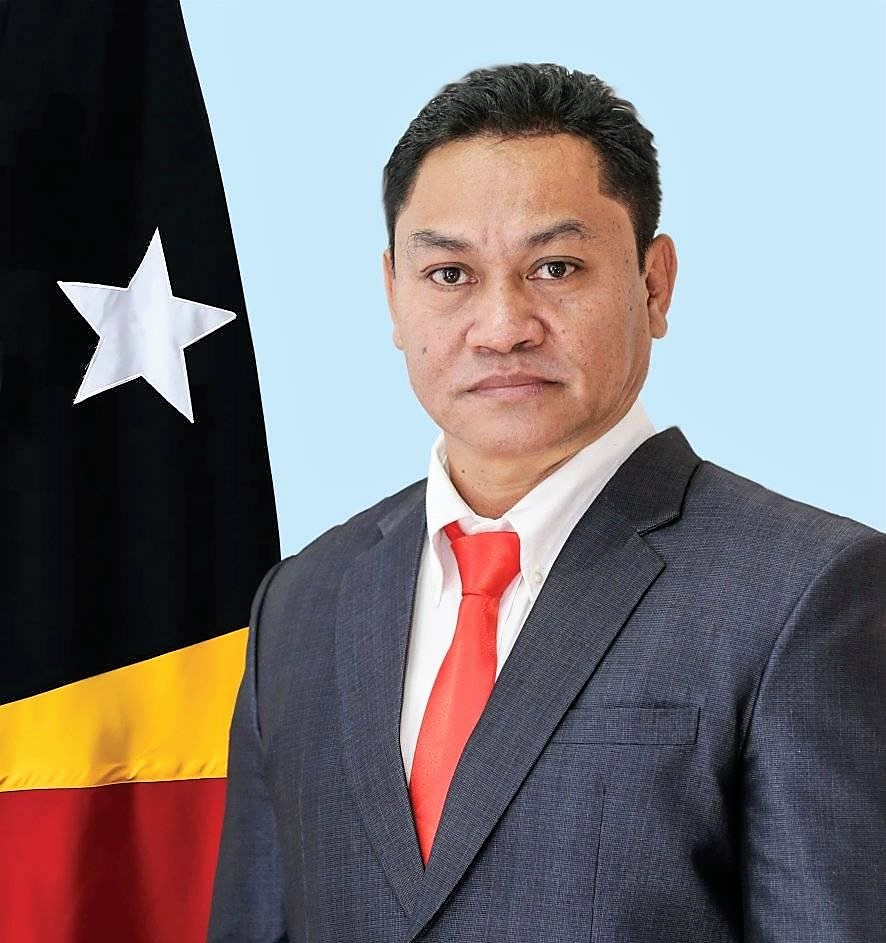
- Silva in 2020

Minister of Tourism, Trade and Industry
- In office 24 June 2020 – 1 July 2023
- Prime Minister: Taur Matan Ruak
- Preceded by: Office re-established
- Succeeded by: Filipus Nino Pereira

Personal details
- Born: 2 March 1970 (age 56)
- Party: Fretilin
- Education: University of Brawijaya; Heriot-Watt University

José Lucas do Carmo da Silva (born 2 March 1970) is an East Timorese politician, marine biologist and academic, and a member of the Fretilin political party.

From June 2020 to July 2023, he was Minister of Tourism, Trade and Industry, serving in the VIII Constitutional Government of East Timor led by Prime Minister Taur Matan Ruak.Presently he the President of Timor Leste Marine and Fishery Association(TLMFA) or in tetum Asosiaun Peskas no Marina Timor Leste (Apm-tl).

== Early life and career ==
From 1990 to 1993, Silva completed a marine and fisheries science training program at Sekolah Tinggi Ilmu Kelautan dan Perikanan in Jakarta, Indonesia.

From 1993 to 1996, Silva was a technical officer in the Fisheries Office. From 1996 to 1998, he studied marine and fisheries science at the University of Brawijaya (UB) in Malang, Indonesia; he graduated with an engineering degree. From 1999 to 2001, he served as an officer at the United Nations High Commissioner for Refugees (UNHCR) office in East Timor, and then, from 2001 to 2003, he studied at Heriot-Watt University in Edinburgh, graduating with a Master of Science degree in Natural Resource Development and Protection.

From 2003 to 2005, Silva worked as the National Program Officer of the Japan International Cooperation Agency (JICA) in East Timor with responsibility for the planning, implementation and monitoring of projects in the countryside and for the development of agriculture. Additionally, he was the coordinator of the trilateral cooperation between East Timor, Japan and the Philippines under the leadership of JICA for the development of alternative agricultural products. He also served as research coordinator for a study on water management in the region around the North Laclo River.

In 2006 and 2007, Silva was responsible for the national census of 2010, for coordinating research on the assessment of population development, and for projects on gender equality, such as the law against domestic violence. Among other things, he worked with the United Nations Population Fund (UNFPA). From May to September 2008, Silva was environmental advisor for the Pipeline Task Force team with responsibility for environmental and socio-economic issues related to the potential impact of the development of the oil industry on the south coast of East Timor.

Between 2008 and 2013, Silva earned a PhD in environmental sciences majoring in marine biology at Heriot-Watt University. In 2014, he worked as a marine and fisheries expert, and in 2015 as an ecosystem specialist for a United Nations Development Programme (UNDP) project on shoreline protection. At the private João Saldanha University (JSU) in Dili, founded in 2015, Silva was a senior researcher and lecturer. From the establishment of the Faculty of Fisheries and Marine Biology at the National University of East Timor (UNTL) in 2017, Silva was its director until June 2020. From 20 th June 2020 to 30 June 2023 as Minister of Tourism, Commerce and Industry. Since June 2023 established Asosiaun Pescas no Marina Timor-Leste (APM- TImor.-Leste) and he is the President apart from lecturer and research.

== Political career ==
Following a change in the governing coalition, and the admission of Fretilin to the VIII Constitutional Government, Silva was sworn in as Minister of Tourism, Trade and Industry on 24 June 2020.

Silva's tenure as Minister ended when the IX Constitutional Government took office on 1 July 2023. He was succeeded by Filipus Nino Pereira.
