= Name That Tune (British game show) =

British TV game show (1976–1998)

- Genre: Music game show
- Created by: Harry Salter
- Presented by: Tom O'Connor; Lionel Blair; Jools Holland; Alison Hammond
- Country of origin: United Kingdom
- Original language: English
- No. of series: 3 (Wednesday at Eight); 3 (London Night Out); 6 (ITV original); 2 (Channel 5)
- No. of episodes: 22 (Wednesday at Eight); 20 (London Night Out); 82 (ITV original); 27 (Channel 5)

Production
- Running time: 15–30 minutes (inc. adverts)
- Production companies: Thames Television (1976–1987); Action Time (1997–1998)

Original release
- Network: ITV
- Release: 7 April 1976 – 30 November 1987
- Network: Channel 5
- Release: 12 September 1997 – 29 December 1998

Related
- American version Spot the Tune

Name That Tune is a British television music game show that put two contestants against each other to test their knowledge of songs. Originating from the United States on NBC Radio Network in 1952, the show first aired on the ITV network in 1976. Tom O'Connor was the first presenter before Lionel Blair took over in 1984.

== Background and history ==
The British version began in 1956. Marion Ryan was the singer in the popular musical quiz Spot the Tune on Granada Television for seven years, with a total of 209 half-hour programmes. Several stars hosted it, including disc-jockey Pete Murray, Canadian pop singer Jackie Rae, and comedians Ken Platt and Ted Ray. The big band in support was that of Peter Knight and his Orchestra. The contestants had to guess the title of a song after hearing only a small sample. The winner of the most cash must try to name as many £5 tunes as possible within 40 seconds. The show also featured a jackpot tune which reached at least £600 on one occasion.

It was later revived as Name That Tune on ITV. The UK pilot was recorded in 1976 and became a 15-minute slot on the popular entertainment series Wednesday at Eight, which went on to become London Night Out. However because the game was so popular, producers Thames Television decided to turn Name That Tune into a half-hour weekly series in 1983. The big band in support was that of Alan Braden and his orchestra.

From 1976 until 1983 it was hosted by Tom O'Connor. Lionel Blair took over from O'Connor in 1984 until the series was dropped from the ITV schedules in 1987. Maggie Moone and Irish trio Sheeba sang the songs that contestants had to guess, while the pianist (whose hands were a regular feature) was Ronnie Price. Nick Jackson served as the announcer.

=== Later revivals ===
In 1997, the series was revived on Channel 5 with Jools Holland as the host for two series in 1997 and 1998.

On 5 May 2007, the show was briefly revived for Vernon Kay's Gameshow Marathon on ITV, with Peter Dickson as announcer. In October 2009, Ant & Dec announced plans to revive the show for Channel 5 early next year, with a host yet to be announced; but this was subsequently scrapped, in August 2010, due to an issue with the owners of the format. Ant and Dec's production company Gallowgate and GroupM Entertainment, who were to co-produce this new revival, instead created a new music quiz show for Channel 5 called The Beat Goes On that was hosted by Dave Berry. ITV would later produce two non-broadcast pilots in 2014 and 2015; the first was hosted by Bill Bailey and the second by Frank Skinner, with Alex Horne and his band The Horne Section providing the music in the latter recording.

It was revived again as the sole new addition to the second series of Alan Carr's Epic Gameshow filmed at Dock10 studios in 2021.

In 2026, it was announced that ITV had commissioned a full revival, hosted by Alison Hammond. The new series will be co-produced by Bright Entertainment, a division of ITV Studios, and Irish production company BiggerStage.

== Rules (1983–87) ==
Two contestants selected from the studio audience competed in various games to earn up to £1200 in cash and prizes.

=== Melody Roulette ===
A wheel was spun onstage up to 5 times to determine a cash prize for identifying the tune. The wheel contained amounts from £10 (later £25) to £100. An outer wheel was also spun which held two spaces marked "Double" and was spun in the opposite direction of the inner. The round continued until one player named three tunes

=== Sing a Tune ===
After hearing the middle section of a tune sung by the show's vocalist, contestants had 7 seconds to write down the title of the tune. The vocalist replaced any words normally part of the song title with "la-las." Three tunes were played and each tune was worth £50 to the contestant who got it right.

=== Bid a Note ===
The host read a clue to a song and the contestants alternated bidding as to how few notes they needed to identify the song. Each contestant stated their bid to their opponent in the famous format "I can name that tune in X", where X was any whole number with 1 being the lowest number of notes and 7 being the highest number of notes. Bidding ended when one contestant challenged the other to "Name That Tune". Bidding also ended when one contestant bid one note or (rarely) zero notes, with intent to identify the song from only the clue read by the host. The first contestant to name three tunes won a special prize (like a Hi-Fi system), and the third had to be either earned naturally, or by default.

=== Golden Medley ===
The contestants attempted to name as many tunes as possible within 30 seconds. The clock stopped as soon as a contestant buzzed in to provide the title, although, after five seconds, the clock stopped and the tune was thrown out. Each tune was worth £50 but the seventh tune was worth £200. The contestant who named seven tunes correctly won the game and went on to the Big Prize Tune.

=== Big Prize Tune ===
The contestant was escorted on-stage into an isolation booth (which was wired so that they could only hear the host and the piano). Then, the pianist opened a golden envelope, with the sheet music for the song, with the title blacked out, and the host held onto a sealed business-size envelope. The pianist then played 20 seconds of the song while a timer counted down. After 20 seconds of playing, the piano player stopped, and the contestant in the booth (who was allowed to give only one answer) had 10 seconds of thinking time before guessing the song's exact title. After the contestant exited the booth, the host then opened the envelope and announced the song's title. If the contestant guessed correctly, they won a new car.

== 1997 version ==
Three contestants would listen to a tune and the first player to buzz in and name the tune scored 10 points and answered a 10-point follow-up question. The two top scoring players at the end of this round played Bidding For Notes and the first player to score three tunes won a special prize and could win up to three more prizes. The player chose a band member, each of whom hid a prize to be won by naming a tune. The player could choose three band members.
