= Tom O'Connor (comedian) =

British entertainer (1939–2021)

- O'Connor in Crosswits 1997
- Born: Thomas Patrick O'Connor; 31 October 1939; Bootle, Lancashire, England
- Died: 18 July 2021 (aged 81); Slough, Berkshire, England
- Notable work: Winner of Opportunity Knocks; Star of The Comedians and Crosswits on ITV
- Spouse: Patricia Finan (m. 1962)
- Children: 4

Comedy career
- Years active: 1971–2018
- Website: http://www.tomoconnor.co.uk/

Thomas Patrick O'Connor (31 October 1939 – 18 July 2021) was a British comedian, television presenter, and actor. Originally a comedian in working men's clubs, he progressed to hosting TV game shows such as Crosswits, The Zodiac Game, Name That Tune, Password and Gambit.

== Early life ==
O'Connor was born in Bootle, and attended St Mary's College, Crosby, and Saint Mary's College, Twickenham. He became a mathematics and music teacher at the St Joan of Arc School, Bootle, and was also assistant headmaster. After work he appeared as a comedian in working men's clubs.

== Television career ==
His television debut came when he appeared on The Comedians, and had a minor acting role in the Granada TV play, Roll on Four O'Clock, but it was talent show Opportunity Knocks that shot him to national fame; he won the show three times. During the 1970s and 1980s he was one of the most popular faces on British TV. He was a subject of the television programme This Is Your Life in 1977 when he was surprised by Eamonn Andrews.

He continued to host many shows including Name that Tune, Wednesday at 8, The Tom O'Connor Show, Gambit, Crosswits and many more, including The Tom O'Connor Road Show for the BBC. This show ran daily at lunch times and was watched by over 12 million viewers each day, but was an expensive show to mount because it came live from a different town each week, requiring the production team to move weekly. The show had several young producers who were overseen by executive producer Steve Weddel, and came out of the now defunct BBC Pebble Mill Studios. The script was written by O'Connor and writer Barry Faulkner, who had worked with O'Connor on his previous shows, with up-to-the-minute changes being made just before broadcast. In 1988 it was reported by the News of the World that he had fallen in love with an 18-year-old prostitute, which challenged his clean-cut image. The newspaper later retracted the allegation. However, within a year he'd lost all but one of his shows, Crosswits.

In 2000, O'Connor made his television acting debut as Father Tom (a Catholic priest) in the BBC series Doctors. On 24 February 2006, he was given an award for having appeared as a guest on the TV programme Countdown 100 times. O'Connor won Celebrity Come Dine with Me, scoring a record-breaking 29/30, on 14 March 2010.

In 2011, O'Connor appeared on Pointless Celebrities, a celebrity edition of the BBC One gameshow with his daughter-in-law Denise Lewis (the gold-medal-winning Olympic heptathlete). They reached the final, eventually winning £500 for charity.

== Stage career ==
His stage acting debut was as Pike in The Perils of the Pond at the Playhouse, Weston-super-Mare, in 1991. O'Connor also appeared in summer stock theatre, cabaret tours and pantomimes.

== Personal life ==
O'Connor married teacher Patricia Finan in 1962, and they had four children including Steve, who married athlete Denise Lewis. O'Connor a Catholic, was diagnosed with Parkinson's disease in 2007, and subsequently with bowel cancer in 2013. He died from pneumonia in Wexham Park Hospital on 18 July 2021, aged 81.

== Bibliography ==
- Tom O'Connor's Book of Liverpool Humour (1987)
- Tom O'Connor's Book of the World's Worst Jokes (Pestalozzi Children's Village Trust, 1991)
- From the Wood to the Tees: An Amusing Golf Companion (Robson, 1992)
- One Flew Over the Clubhouse (Robson, 1993)
- Take a Funny Turn (Robson, 1994)
- Follow Me, I'm Right Behind You! (Robson, 1995)
- Eat Like a Horse, Drink Like a Fish (Robson, 1996).
- Fit to Travel (Acer Designs, 2004)
- Golf...is Where You Find It (Acer Designs, 2005)
- Is There Anything in that Empty Box? (Acer Designs, 2005)
- I Remember: the Collected Thoughts of Tom O’Connor (Acer Designs, 2008)
