= Filipus Nino Pereira =

East Timorese politician

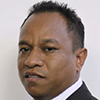
- Pereira in 2012

Minister of Commerce and Industry
- Incumbent
- Assumed office 1 July 2023
- Preceded by: José Lucas do Carmo da Silva; (as Minister of Tourism, Trade and Industry)

Vice Minister of Commerce, Industry and Environment
- In office 10 August 2015 – 15 September 2017
- Prime Minister: Rui Maria de Araújo
- Preceded by: Constâncio da Conceição Pinto
- Succeeded by: Jacinto Gusmão; (as Vice Minister of Commerce and Industry)

Secretary of State of Industry and Cooperatives
- In office 8 August 2012 – 16 February 2015
- Prime Minister: Xanana Gusmão
- Preceded by: Office established
- Succeeded by: Office abolished

Personal details
- Party: Democratic Party (PD)

Filipus Nino Pereira is an East Timorese politician, and a member of the Democratic Party (Portuguese: Partido Democrático, PD).

He is the incumbent Minister of Commerce and Industry, serving since July 2023 in the IX Constitutional Government of East Timor led by Prime Minister Xanana Gusmão.
