= List of Indonesian acronyms and abbreviations =

== A ==
AAL (Akademi Angkatan Laut) - Indonesian Naval Academy

AAU (Akademi Angkatan Udara) - Indonesian Air Force Academy

ABK (anak buah kapal) - ship's crew

ABRI (Angkatan Bersenjata Republik Indonesia) - Military of Indonesia (New Order Era)

Akmil (Akademi Militer) - Indonesian Military Academy

Alutsista (Alat Utama Sistem Senjata Tentara Nasional Indonesia) - Indonesian National Armed Forces Armaments and Munitions

AMD (ABRI Masuk Desa) - A social responsibility program by Indonesian army (ABRI), such as providing free medical service, repairing/building roads and public utilities.

AMS (Dutch: Algeme(e)ne Middelbare School) - High School or College (Dutch colonial era)

antv (Andalas Televisi) - Andalas Television (Private Television Station)

APBN (Anggaran Pendapatan dan Belanja Negara). The national budget.

APRA (Angkatan Perang Ratu Adil) - a rebel group against Republic of Indonesia (1950), led by former Dutch army officer, Captain Westerling.

AS (Amerika Serikat) - USA, the United States of America

== B ==
Bakin (Badan Koordinasi Intelijen) - Indonesian Intelligence Coordination body, renamed BIN (Indonesian State Intelligence Agency - Badan Intelijen Negara).

Bakom PKB (Badan Komunikasi Penghayatan Kesatuan Bangsa) - an ethnic Chinese organization, led by Major Sindhunata.

Bakosurtanal (Badan Koordinasi Survei dan Pemetaan Nasional) - National Coordinating Agency for Surveying and Mapping.

Bappenas (Badan Perencanaan dan Pembangunan Nasional) Indonesian National Development Agency.

Baperki (Badan Permusjawaratan Kewarganegaraan Indonesia) - an ethnic Chinese organization affiliated with the Indonesian Communist Party (PKI).

Basarnas (Badan SAR Nasional) - National search and rescue organization.

BIN (Badan Intelijen Nasional) - State Intelligence Agency (Indonesia).

BKKBN (Badan Koordinasi Keluarga Berencana Nasional) - a coordinating body of family planning (Indonesian birth control) movement.

BKN (Badan Kepegawaian Negara) - Agency for government employees

BLT (Bantuan Langsung Tunai) - Direct Cash Assistance, government program that provides direct cash assistance to low-income citizens to help meet basic needs and maintain economic stability.

BNN (Badan Narkotika Nasional) - Agency for monitoring narcotics

BPPT (Badan Pengkajian dan Penerapan Teknologi) - Agency for The Assessment and Application of Technology.

Berita Negara - Official Gazette of Indonesia.

BRI (Bank Rakyat Indonesia) - People's Bank of Indonesia, a state owned bank.

== C ==
Cagub (Calon Gubenur) - Gubernatorial Candidate

Capres (Calon Presiden) - Presidential Candidate

Cawagub (Calon Wakil Gubenur) - Lieutenant Gubernatorial Candidate

Cawakot (Calon Wali Kota) - Mayoral Candidate

Cawapres (Calon Wakil Presiden) - Vice Presidential Candidate

Cerkan (Cerita Rekaan) - Fiction

Cerpen (Cerita Pendek) - Short story

== D ==
Depdagri (Departemen Dalam Negeri) - Department of Internal Affairs

Depdikbud (Departemen Pendidikan dan Kebudayaan) - Department of Education and Culture (Suharto era)

Depdiknas (Departemen Pendidikan Nasional Republik Indonesia) - Department of Education

Dephan (Departemen Pertahanan) - Department of Defense

Deplu (Departemen Luar Negeri) - Department of Foreign Affairs

Depsos (Departemen Sosial) - Department of Social Affairs

DI (Daerah Istimewa) - special region

DIPIAD (Dinas Pusat Intelijen Angkatan Darat) Army Central Intelligence Service

DI/TII/NII (Darul Islam/Tentara Islam Indonesia/Negara Islam Indonesia) - an extreme Muslim rebel group against Republic of Indonesia in West Java (1945–1963), led by Kartosoewiryo. Their main goal was establishing an Islamic country in Indonesia.

DJP (Direktorat Jenderal Pajak) - Directorate General of Taxation

DKI (Daerah Khusus Ibukota) - Special Capital Region (Jakarta)

DPD (Dewan Perwakilan Daerah) - Regional Representative Council

DPR (Dewan Perwakilan Rakyat) - People's Representative Council

DPRD (Dewan Perwakilan Rakyat Daerah) - Regional People's Representative Council

Drachin (Drama China) - Chinese dramas

Drakor (Drama Korea) - Korean dramas

== E ==
ELS (Dutch: Europeesche Lagere School) - Primary School (Dutch colonial era).

ET (Eks Tahanan Politik) - a mark put on the ID Card (Kartu Tanda Penduduk) of former political prisoners (new order era).

== G ==
GAM (Gerakan Aceh Merdeka) - Free Aceh Movement, a rebel group against Republic of Indonesia (1976–2005).

GRM (Gerakan Riau Merdeka) - Free Riau Movement

Gerindra (Gerakan Indonesia Raya) - Great Indonesia Movement Party (Gerindra Party)

Gerwani (Gerakan Wanita) - The women's organisation of the Communist Party of Indonesia.

GIA (Garuda Indonesia Airlines) - a state owned airlines (the official flag carrier), also it's ICAO code.

Golkar (Golongan Karya) - The Party of Functional Groups (Golkar)

GUDPUSZI (Gudang Pusat Zeni) - Indonesian Army Corps of Engineers Central Warehouse.

== I ==
IDI (Ikatan Dokter Indonesia) - Indonesian Doctor Association

IFI (Ikatan Fisioterapi Indonesia) - Indonesian Physiotherapy Association

IKAPI (Ikatan Penerbit Indonesia) - Association of Indonesian Publishers

IPA (Ilmu Pengetahuan Alam) - Science

IPDN (Institut Pemerintahan Dalam Negeri) - Governance Institute of Home Affairs

IPS (Ilmu Pengetahuan Sosial) - Social science

ITB (Institut Teknologi Bandung) - Bandung Institute of Technology

ITS (Institut Teknologi Sepuluh November) - Sepuluh Nopember Institute of Technology

== J ==
JI (Jemaah Islamiyah) - a Muslim terrorist group established in Malaysia by Abu Bakar Basyir and Sungkar.

== K ==
KAI (Kereta Api Indonesia) - a state owned train company.

KBRI (Kedutaan Besar Republik Indonesia) - Indonesian Embassy

KJRI (Konsulat Jenderal Republik Indonesia [id]) - Indonesian Consulate General

KKB (Kredit Kendaraan Bermotor) - automotive loan

KKN:

- Korupsi, Kolusi, Nepotisme - Corruption, Collusion, Nepotism.
- Kuliah Kerja Nyata - senior universities students work as intern in companies or villages.

Kelompencapir [id] (Kelompok Pendengar, Pembaca, Pirsawan) - a group of Indonesian farmers in villages who listen to radio, watch TV, and read newspapers together for information about farming and agriculture.

Kemdagri (Kementrian Dalam Negeri) - Ministry of Internal Affairs (current)

Kemlu (Kementrian Luar Negeri) - Ministry of Foreign Affairs (current)

Kemsos (Kementrian Sosial) - Ministry of Social Affairs (current)

Kopaja (Koperasi Angkutan Jakarta) - A very common bus seen in Jakarta transporting people for about Rp. 2,000

KODAM (Komando Daerah Militer) - Indonesian Army's Provincial office

Komcad(Komponen Cadangan) - Indonesian National Armed Forces Reserve Component

KOPASSUS (Komando Pasukan Khusus) - Indonesian Army's special troops command.

KORAMIL (Komando Rayon Militer [id]) - Indonesian Army's district office

Korsel (Korea Selatan) - South Korea

KOSTRAD (Komando Strategis dan Cadangan TNI Angkatan Darat) - Army Strategic Reserve Command.

Kowani (Kongress Wanita Indonesia) - Indonesian Women's Congress

KPI:

- Koalisi Perempuan Indonesia untuk Keadilan dan Demokrasi [id] - Indonesian Women's Coalition for Justice and Democracy
- Komisi Penyiaran Indonesia - Indonesian institution for monitoring television broadcasting.

KPA (Kredit Pemilikan Apartemen) - apartment mortgage

KPK (Komisi Pemberantasan Korupsi - counter-corruption agency)

KPR (Kredit Pemilikan Rumah) - housing mortgage

KTI (Karya Tulis Ilmiah) - Scientific paper

KTP (Kartu Tanda Penduduk) - Identity Card

KUD (Koperasi Unit Desa) - cooperation of farmers in a village.

KUK (Kredit Usaha Kecil) - micro credits for small-scale business.

KUR (Kredit Usaha Rakyat [id]) - government priority program for financing MSMEs (current)

KUT (Kredit Usaha Tani) - micro credits for farmers in villages.

== L ==
LAPAN (Lembaga Antariksa dan Penerbangan Nasional) - Indonesian National Aerospace Institute

Lantatur (Layanan Tanpa Turun) - Drive-through

LAPAS (LEMBAGA PERMASYARAKATAN) - Indonesian Correctional Facility

LBHI (Lembaga Bantuan Hukum Indonesia) - Indonesia Free Legal Aid Institute

LDII (LEMBAGA DAKWAH ISLAM INDONESIA) - Pengajian Islam Berdasarkan Qur`an Hadis

Lekra (Lembaga Kebudayaan Rakyat) - a pro Indonesian communist party (PKI) artist organization. One of the leaders of Lekra was Pramoedya Ananta Toer

LIPI (Lembaga Ilmu Pengetahuan Indonesia) - Indonesian Institute of Science

LKBN (Lembaga Kantor Berita Nasional) - National News Bureau

LPS (Lembaga Penjamin Simpanan) - Indonesia Deposit Insurance Corporation

== M ==
Mahmilub (Mahkamah Militer Luar Biasa) - special Military court created in 1966 to prosecute military and civilian perpetrators of G30S movement.

Masyumi (Majelis Syura Muslimin Indonesia) - an old Islamic Party During Liberal democratic era (1949–1959).

Mendiknas (Menteri Pendidikan Nasional) - Minister of Education (current political title)

Menlu (Menteri Luar Negeri) - Foreign Minister

MMI (Majelis Mujahidin Indonesia) - an extreme Muslim group in Surakarta, Central Java, led by Abu Bakar Basyir.

MPR (Majelis Permusyawaratan Rakyat) - People's Consultative Assembly - national legislature.

MULO (Dutch: Meer Uitgebreid Lager Onderwijs) - Middle School (Dutch colonial era)

== N ==
Narkoba (NARKotika dan Obat-obatan berBAhaya) - Narcotics and Dangerous Drugs

Nasakom (Nasionalis, Agama, Komunis) - an abbreviation created by Sukarno "Nationalist, Religionist, Communist"

Napza (Narkotika, Psikotropika dan Zat-zat Adiktif) - Narcotics, Psychotropics and Addictive Substance.

Nataru (Natal dan Tahun Baru) - Christmas and New Year holiday.

Nekolim (Neo Kolonialisme dan Imperialisme) an abbreviation created by Sukarno "Neo Colonialism and Imperialism"

== O ==
OJK (Otoritas Jasa Keuangan) - Financial Services Authority

OPM (Organisasi Papua Merdeka) - Free Papua Movement

Otda (Otonomi Daerah) - Regional autonomy

== P ==
Padus (Paduan Suara) - Choir

Paskibra (Pasukan Pengibar Bendera) - flag raiser troops

Paskibraka (Pasukan Pengibar Bendera Pusaka) - Flag Raiser troops on August 17 Ceremony at Merdeka Palace

PAL (Penataran Angkatan Laut) - Navy Shipyard (PAL Indonesia)

PAN (Partai Amanat Nasional) - National Mandate Party

PAUD (Pendidikan Anak Usia Dini) - Indonesian Kindegarten

PBB:

- (Perserikatan Bangsa-bangsa) - United Nations
- (Pajak Bumi dan Bangunan) - Ground and Building Tax

PDGI (Persatuan Dokter Gigi Indonesia) - Union of Indonesian Dentists

PDIP (Partai Demokrasi Indonesia Perjuangan) - Indonesian Democratic Party of Struggle

PDRI (Pemerintahan Darurat Republik Indonesia) - Emergency Government of the Republic of Indonesia: from December 22, 1948, to December 27, 1949. This emergency government was located in Bukittinggi, West Sumatra and led by Syafruddin Prawiranegara.

PELNI (Pelayaran Nasional Indonesia) - the state owned ocean liner company.

Permias (Persekutuan Mahasiswa Indonesia di Amerika Serikat) - Organization of the Indonesian Students in the United States

PKI (Partai Komunis Indonesia) - Indonesian Communist Party

PKK (Pendidikan Kesejahteraan Keluarga) - lit "Family Welfare Education" The National Women's Movement

PKN STAN (Politeknik Keuangan Negara STAN) - Indonesian State College of Accountancy

PMA (Penanaman Modal Asing) - Foreign Direct Investment company

PMDN - Domestic Direct Investment company, i.e. 100% of shares held by Indonesian citizens

PMI (Palang Merah Indonesia) - Indonesian Red Cross.

PMKRI (Perhimpunan Mahasiswa Katholik Republik Indonesia) - Union of Catholic University Students of the Republic of Indonesia

PMR (Palang Merah Remaja) - Youth Red Cross

POLRI (Polisi Republik Indonesia) - Indonesian National Police.

PP (Peraturan Pemerintah) - Government Regulations.

PPh (Pajak Penghasilan) - Salary Tax.

PPN (Pajak Pertambahan Nilai) - Value added Tax / Good and Service Tax.

PPnBM (Pajak Pertambahan Nilai Barang Mewah) - Luxury Goods tax.

Pramuka (Praja Muda Karana) - Indonesian Scout Organization

PRRI/Permesta (Pemerintahan Revolusioner Republik Indonesia/Perjuangan Rakyat Semesta) - a rebel group against Republic of Indonesia in West Sumatra and North Sulawesi (1957), supported by Central Intelligence Agency (CIA).

PT (Perseroan Terbatas) - Limited Liability Company (LLC) -or- Proprietary Limited (Pty Ltd)

== R ==
RAPBN (Rancangan Anggaran Pendapatan dan Belanja Negara) - The National Budget Plans.

RBTV (Reksa Birama Televisi) - Regional television station

RCTI (Rajawali Citra Televisi Indonesia) - (lit: Hawk Television Indonesia) Private Television Broadcaster

Repelita (Rencana Pembangunan Lima Tahun) - Five-Year Development Plan

RI (Republik Indonesia) - Republic of Indonesia.

RIS (Republik Indonesia Serikat) - The United States of Indonesia (from December 27, 1949, to August 17, 1950).

Rohis (Rohani Islam) - Islamic school organization

Rohkris (Rohani Kristen) - Christian school organization.

RPKAD (Resimen Para Komando Angkatan Darat) - Former Indonesian Army's Special Operation Troops (now KOPASSUS)

RRC or RRT (Republik Rakyat Cina or Republik Rakyat Tiongkok) - People's Republic of China

RS (Rumah Saki) - Hospital:

- RSU (Rumah Sakit Umum) - Public hospital.
- RSUD (Rumah Sakit Umum Daerah) - Regional public hospital.
- RSJ (Rumah Sakit Jiwa) - Psychiatric hospital.
- RSB (Rumah Sakit Bersalin) - Maternity hospital.
- RSIA (Rumah Sakit Ibu dan Anak) - Pediatrics and Women hospital.
- RSAD (Rumah Sakit Angkatan Darat) - Military hospital (Indonesia army).
- RSAL (Rumah Sakit Angkatan Laut) - Military hospital (Indonesia navy).

== S ==
Sekjen (Sekretariat Jenderal or Sekretaris Jenderal) - Secretary General (of an organization)

SCTV (Surya Citra Televisi) - (lit: Sun Television) Private Television Broadcaster

SD (Sekolah Dasar) - Primary School (current)

SDSB (Sumbangan Dana Sosial Berhadiah) - National Lottery (defunct)

SIM (Surat Izin Mengemudi) - Driving License

SLTA (Sekolah Lanjutan Tingkat Atas) - High School

SLTP (Sekolah Lanjutan Tingkat Pertama) - Middle School

SMA (Sekolah Menengah Atas) - High School (It was first used before the name SLTA, but currently used again widely)

SMP (Sekolah Menengah Pertama) - Middle School (It was first used before the name SLTP, but currently used again widely)

Supersemar (Surat Perintah Sebelas Maret) - 11 March Government Letter. Letter written by President Sukarno in 1966 formally granting Suharto Emergency Powers over the nation of Indonesia.

== T ==
TH (Tahun) - Used for shortening years, typically anniversaries. e.g. 73TH Indonesia Merdeka.

Tapol (Tahanan Politik) - Political prisoner

Tarnus (Taruna Nusantara) - Taruna Nusantara

TKA (Tenaga Kerja Asing) - Foreign labor

TKI (Tenaga Kerja Indonesia) - Indonesian labor

TNI (Tentara Nasional Indonesia) - Military of Indonesia

TNI AD (Tentara Nasional Indonesia Angkatan Darat) - Indonesian Army

TNI AL (Tentara Nasional Indonesia Angkatan Laut) - Indonesian Navy

TNI AU (Tentara Nasional Indonesia Angkatan Udara) - Indonesian Airforce

TPI (Televisi Pendidikan Indonesia) - Educational Television Indonesia (private television broadcaster)

TVRI (Televisi Republik Indonesia) - Television of Republic of Indonesia (publicly owned broadcaster)

== U ==
UI (Universitas Indonesia) - University of Indonesia

UGM (Universitas Gadjah Mada) - Gadjah Mada University

UNAIR (Universitas Airlangga) - Airlangga University

USU (Universitas Sumatera Utara) - University of North Sumatra

UT (Universitas Terbuka) - Indonesia Open University

UMR (Upah Minimum Regional) - Regional minimum wage

UU (Undang-undang) - Constitution

UUD (Undang-undang Dasar) - Basic law

== W ==
WALHI (Wahana Lingkungan Hidup) - Indonesian Environmental Organization

Wapres (Wakil Presiden) - Vice President

WIB (Waktu Indonesia Barat) - Western Indonesia Time, i.e. UTC/GMT+7, a.k.a. time in Jakarta

WIT (Waktu Indonesia Timur) - Eastern Indonesia Time, i.e. UTC/GMT+9, a.k.a. time in Papua

WITA (Waktu Indonesia Tenggah) - Central Indonesia Time, i.e. UTC/GMT+8, a.k.a. time in Bali

WNA (warga negara asing) - Foreign citizen

WNI (warga negara Indonesia) - Indonesian citizen

== Y ==
YPAC (Yayasan Pendidikan Anak-anak Cacat) - Foundation for the Education of Disabled Children.
