= 2021 in British music =

This is a summary of the year 2021 in British music.

== Events ==
- 11 January – The London Symphony Orchestra (LSO) announces that Sir Simon Rattle is to stand down as its music director in 2023, and is scheduled subsequently to take the title of LSO conductor emeritus for life.
- 21 January – The Glastonbury Festival announces the cancellation of its scheduled 2021 Festival, in the wake of the COVID-19 pandemic.
- 22 January – The City of Birmingham Symphony Orchestra announces that Mirga Gražinytė-Tyla is to conclude her tenure as its music director after the 2021–2022 season, and subsequently to take on the post of principal guest conductor.
- 27 January – PRS for Music institutes its new "Online Live Concert" licence fee, for ticketed small-scale live-streamed performances, at a scale of £22.50 plus VAT for events with revenue up to £250, regardless of whether the takings surpass £250, and a doubling of the fee for events that gross between £251 and £500.
- 1 February – Following protests by musicians, PRS for Music announces an amendment to its new "Online Live Concert" licence fee scheme, whereby livestreamed events that produce less than £500 revenue are newly to be covered by a free licence, on the condition that artists exclusively perform their own works.
- 5 February – The Schleswig-Holstein Musik Festival announces Isata Kanneh-Mason as the recipient of its Leonard Bernstein Award for 2021.
- 18 February – The City of London Corporation announces the cancellation of plans for the intended Centre for Music, with scheduled renovations of the Barbican Centre to occur instead.
- 1 March – The Download Festival announces cancellation of its 2021 festival season, in the wake of the COVID-19 pandemic.
- 2 March – The Isle of Wight Festival announces the rescheduling of its 2021 festival season from 17–20 June 2021 to 16–19 September 2021.
- 9 March – Winston Marshall announces that he is taking indefinite leave of absence from Mumford & Sons, following criticism of his Tweet in praise of Andy Ngo's book Unmasked.
- 12 March – The Association of British Orchestras announces its 2021 ABO Awards at its 2021 conference:
  - ABO Award: The Musicians
  - Classical Music Artist Manager of the Year: Moema Parrott
  - Classical Music Concert Hall Manager of the Year: John Gilhooly
  - Orchestra Manager of the Year: Crispin Woodhead
  - Commendation: Greg Felton
  - ABO Special Award: John Summers and Timothy Walker
- 16 March – Royal Northern Sinfonia announces the appointment of Dinis Sousa as its next principal conductor, effective September 2021.
- 18 March – The BBC announces that the leadership team of BBC Radio 3 is to relocate to Salford, along with relocation of select Radio 6 staff.
- 30 March
  - The London Symphony Orchestra announces the appointment of Sir Antonio Pappano as its next chief conductor, effective in September 2024.
  - The Royal Opera announces that Sir Antonio Pappano is to conclude his tenure as ROH music director at the close of the 2023–2024 season.
- 7 April – Southbank Sinfonia and St John's Smith Square mutually announce their merger into a single charity and organisation, Southbank Sinfonia at St John's Smith Square.
- 8 April – The London Philharmonic Orchestra announces the appointment of Elena Dubinets as its next artistic director, effective September 2021, following the departure of Cristina Rocca from the post.
- 13 April – English Touring Opera announces the appointment of Gerry Cornelius as its next music director, with immediate effect.
- 30 April – At Bramley-Moore Dock, Liverpool, 3000 clubbers participate in an Events Research Programme test event headlined by DJ Jayda G, without social distancing or required mask-wearing, as part of a scientific study on coronavirus transmission at mass events.
- 2 May
  - The BBC announces percussionist Fang Zhang as the BBC Young Musician 2020.
  - At Sefton Park, Liverpool, 5000 attendees attend a live concert with performances by Zuzu and by Blossoms, in an Events Research Programme test event, without social distancing or required mask-wearing, as part of a scientific study on coronavirus transmission at mass events, the largest such UK music gathering since the start of the COVID-19 pandemic.
- 12 June – Queen's Birthday Honours List 2021:
  - Imogen Cooper is made a Dame Commander of the British Empire.
  - Ram John Holder, Lulu, and Rick Wakeman are each made a Commander of the Order of the British Empire.
  - Eleanor Alberga, Julian Lloyd Webber, Alan Parsons, Skin (Deborah Anne Dyer), John Summers, and Michael Volpe are each made an Officer of the Order of the British Empire.
  - Jess Gillam, Dennis Bovell, Engelbert Humperdinck, Alison Moyet, Huw Watkins, and Sarah Willis are each made a Member of the Order of the British Empire.
  - Alan Hawkshaw and Jeremy Huw Williams are each awarded the British Empire Medal.
- 18 June – The Download Pilot Festival begins in Donington Park in Leicestershire, a 3-day pilot test event without mask or social distance requirements for attendees.
- 24 June – Winston Marshall announces that he is leaving Mumford & Sons, following controversy over him praising right-wing journalist Andy Ngo.
- 4 August – The BBC announces the appointment of Bill Chandler as the new director of the BBC Concert Orchestra, effective 4 September 2021.
- 10 August – The BBC announces the appointment of Suzy Klein as its new head of arts and classical music TV, effective 4 October 2021.
- 14 August – Simon Gallup announces that he has left The Cure, citing "betrayal" as his reasons for leaving. Gallup soon deleted his post, and confirmed on 14 October that he was still in the band.
- 17 August – Alan Leach and Joe Johnson announce that they will be leaving Shed Seven after fulfilling their touring commitments with the band in the Summer.
- 23 August – John Lydon loses a legal case, to prevent former Sex Pistols bandmates Steve Jones and Paul Cook from allowing the use of their songs in a television biopic based on the band.
- 5 September – The Sinfonia of London, in its newest incarnation, performs its first live concert at the Royal Albert Hall as part of the 2021 season of The Proms, conducted by John Wilson.
- 14 September – The City of Birmingham Symphony Orchestra announces the appointment of Kazuki Yamada as its next chief conductor and artistic advisor, the first Asian conductor ever named to the posts, effective 1 April 2023, with an initial contract of 4.5 years.
- 18 September – The 2021 Leeds International Piano Competition announces its prize winners:
  - First prize: Alim Beisembayev
  - Second prize: Kaito Kabayashi
  - Third prize: Ariel Lanyi
  - Fourth prize: Dmytro Choni
  - Fifth prize: Thomas Kelly
- 15 October – The Choir of St John's College, Cambridge announces its intention to admit female singers to the choir for the first time in its history, effective in 2022.
- 17 October – The London Handel Festival announces the appointment of Gregory Batsleer as its next festival director, with immediate effect.
- 25 October – The London Mozart Players announce the appointment of Flynn LeBrocq as its new chief executive, effective January 2022.
- 1 November – The Royal Philharmonic Society announces the recipients of the 2021 Royal Philharmonic Society Awards:
  - Chamber-Scale Composition: Laura Bowler – Wicked Problems
  - Conductor: Ryan Bancroft
  - Ensemble: Dunedin Consort
  - Gamechanger: Bold Tendencies
  - Impact: ENO Breathe
  - Inspiration: Hilary Campbell and Bristol Choral Society
  - Instrumentalist: Nicola Benedetti
  - Large-Scale Composition: Dani Howard – Trombone Concerto
  - Opera & Music Theatre: L'enfant et les sortilèges – Vopera
  - Series & Events: 'The World How Wide' – Chorus of Royal Northern Sinfonia
  - Singer: Jennifer Johnston
  - Storytelling: Kadiatu Kanneh-Mason – House of Music
  - Young Artist: The Hermes Experiment
- 18 November – Sir Roger Norrington conducts his self-proclaimed final classical concert, with the Royal Northern Sinfonia at The Sage, Gateshead.
- 4 December – The Schleswig-Holstein Musik Festival announces Hannah Kendall as the recipient of its Hindemith Prize 2022.
- 8 December – The Ivors Composer Awards announces its 2021 recipients:
  - Impact Award – Zoe Rahman
  - Visionary Award – Sarah Angliss
  - Innovation Award – Cleveland Watkiss
  - Jazz Composition – Nikki Iles: The Caged Bird
  - Large-Scale Composition – Anna Þorvaldsdóttir: Catamorphosis
  - Outstanding Works Collection – Alexander Goehr
  - Small Chamber Composition – Alex Paxton: Sometimes Voices
  - Solo Composition – Martin Iddon: Lampades
  - Sound Art – Caroline Kraabel: London 26 And 28 March 2020: Imitation: Inversion
  - Vocal and Choral Composition – Thomas Adès: Gyökér (Root)
- 31 December – 2022 New Year Honours:
  - John Gilhooly is made a Commander of the Order of the British Empire.
  - Alpesh Chauhan, Steven Osborne, and Mark Pemberton are each made an Officer of the Order of the British Empire.
  - Michael Asante, Peter Broadbent, Andrew Carwood, Sydney Harris, and Berendina Norton are each made a Member of the Order of the British Empire.
  - Nikki Iles and Mark Strachan are each awarded the British Empire Medal.

== Bands formed ==
- Girls Don't Sync

== Bands reformed ==
- Altered Images
- The Boo Radleys
- Electrasy
- Faces
- Hundred Reasons
- The Wanted

== Classical works ==
- Thomas Adès
  - Shanty – Over the Sea
  - Alchymia (clarinet quintet)
- Sir George Benjamin – Concerto for Orchestra
- Charlotte Bray – When Icebergs Dance Away
- Jay Capperauld – Nutshell Studies of Unexplained Death
- Tom Coult – Pleasure Garden
- Jonathan Dove – In Exile
- Bryn Harrison – A Coiled Form
- Simon Holt – Cloud Shadow
- Hannah Kendall
  - Rosalind (text Sabrina Mahfouz) –
  - Where is the chariot of fire?
- Daniel Kidane – Revel
- Natalie Klouda – Nightscapes 2020
- Cecilia McDowall – There is no rose
- Sir James MacMillan – When Soft Voices Die
- Grace-Evangeline Mason – The Imagined Forest
- Colin Matthews – Seascapes (texts by Sidney Keyes)
- Adam Pounds – Symphony No 3
- Rebecca Saunders (music) and Ed Atkins (text) – Us Dead Talk Love
- Jack Sheen – Hollow propranolol séance
- Mark Simpson – Violin Concerto
- Sir John Tavener – La Noche Oscura (completed in 2012, premiered 25 June 2021)
- Mark-Anthony Turnage
  - Owl Songs
  - Up for Grabs
- Errollyn Wallen – Sojourner Truth
- Kate Whitley (music) and Laura Attridge (text) – Our Future in Your Hands

== Opera ==
- Samantha Ferrando and Melanie Wilson – Current, Rising

== Musical theatre ==
- Fisherman's Friends: The Musical, with book by Amanda Whittington – ran from 13 to 30 October at the Cornwall Playhouse, Truro, starring Calum Callaghan and Susie Blake.
- Get Up, Stand Up! The Bob Marley Musical, with book by Lee Hall – opened on 21 October at the Lyric Theatre, London, starring Arinzé Kene as Bob Marley.

== Film scores and incidental music ==
=== Film ===
- Stefan Gregory – The Dig
- Dominic Lewis – Peter Rabbit 2: The Runaway, directed by Will Gluck

=== Television ===
- John Paesano – Leonardo

== British music awards ==
- Brit Awards – see 2021 Brit Awards

== Charts and sales ==
=== Number-one singles ===
The singles chart includes a proportion for streaming.

Key
†	Best performing single of the year

Chart date (week ending)	Song	Artist(s)	Chart sales	References
7 January	"Last Christmas"	Wham!	40,149	
14 January	"Sweet Melody"	Little Mix	31,186	
21 January	"Drivers License"	Olivia Rodrigo	95,000	
28 January	"Drivers License"	Olivia Rodrigo	117,000	
4 February	"Drivers License"	Olivia Rodrigo	86,000	
11 February	"Drivers License"	Olivia Rodrigo	69,000	
18 February	"Drivers License"	Olivia Rodrigo	59,000	
25 February	"Drivers License"	Olivia Rodrigo	52,000	
4 March	"Drivers License"	Olivia Rodrigo	46,404	
11 March	"Drivers License"	Olivia Rodrigo	42,279	
18 March	"Drivers License"	Olivia Rodrigo	38,429	
25 March	"Wellerman"	Nathan Evans, 220 Kid and Billen Ted	50,891	
1 April	"Wellerman"	Nathan Evans, 220 Kid and Billen Ted	50,454	
8 April	"Montero (Call Me by Your Name)"	Lil Nas X	45,426	
15 April	"Montero (Call Me by Your Name)"	Lil Nas X	62,065	
22 April	"Montero (Call Me by Your Name)"	Lil Nas X	64,140	
29 April	"Montero (Call Me by Your Name)"	Lil Nas X	59,769	
6 May	"Montero (Call Me by Your Name)"	Lil Nas X	57,475	
13 May	"Body"	Russ Millions and Tion Wayne	71,208	
20 May	"Body"	Russ Millions and Tion Wayne	81,119	
27 May	"Body"	Russ Millions and Tion Wayne	70,528	
3 June	"Good 4 U"	Olivia Rodrigo	117,000	
10 June	"Good 4 U"	Olivia Rodrigo	108,219	
17 June	"Good 4 U"	Olivia Rodrigo	95,867	
24 June	"Good 4 U"	Olivia Rodrigo	82,305	
1 July	"Good 4 U"	Olivia Rodrigo	73,421	
8 July	"Bad Habits"†	Ed Sheeran	92,086	
15 July	"Bad Habits"†	Ed Sheeran	102,705	
22 July	"Bad Habits"†	Ed Sheeran	101,080	
29 July	"Bad Habits"†	Ed Sheeran	101,353	
5 August	"Bad Habits"†	Ed Sheeran	85,433	
12 August	"Bad Habits"†	Ed Sheeran	81,655	
19 August	"Bad Habits"†	Ed Sheeran	76,561	
26 August	"Bad Habits"†	Ed Sheeran	87,324	
2 September	"Bad Habits"†	Ed Sheeran	83,622	
9 September	"Bad Habits"†	Ed Sheeran	71,720	
16 September	"Bad Habits"†	Ed Sheeran	69,446	
23 September	"Shivers"	Ed Sheeran	59,181	
30 September	"Shivers"	Ed Sheeran	56,424	
7 October	"Shivers"	Ed Sheeran	63,520	
14 October	"Shivers"	Ed Sheeran	61,366	
21 October	"Cold Heart (Pnau remix)"	Elton John and Dua Lipa	63,298	
28 October	"Easy on Me"	Adele	217,317	
4 November	"Easy on Me"	Adele	103,194	
11 November	"Easy on Me"	Adele	78,628	
18 November	"Easy on Me"	Adele	67,742	
25 November	"Easy on Me"	Adele	67,102	
2 December	"Easy on Me"	Adele	100,627	
9 December	"Easy on Me"	Adele	69,372	
16 December	"Merry Christmas"	Ed Sheeran and Elton John	76,700	
23 December	"Merry Christmas"	Ed Sheeran and Elton John	63,443	
30 December	"Sausage Rolls for Everyone"	LadBaby featuring Ed Sheeran and Elton John	136,445	

=== Number-one albums ===
The albums chart includes a proportion for streaming.

Key
†	Best performing album of the year

Chart date (week ending)	Album	Artist(s)	Chart sales	References
7 January	Christmas	Michael Bublé	10,202	
14 January	Evermore	Taylor Swift	7,330	
21 January	Greenfields	Barry Gibb	16,166	
28 January	Suckapunch	You Me at Six	14,298	
4 February	Post Human: Survival Horror	Bring Me the Horizon	14,904	
11 February	Not Your Muse	Celeste	22,475	
18 February	Medicine at Midnight	Foo Fighters	42,846	
25 February	Tyron	Slowthai	16,940	
4 March	As the Love Continues	Mogwai	10,456	
11 March	For Those That Wish to Exist	Architects	12,542	
18 March	When You See Yourself	Kings of Leon	19,530	
25 March	Evering Road	Tom Grennan	17,322	
1 April	Chemtrails over the Country Club	Lana Del Rey	40,111	
8 April	Collections from the Whiteout	Ben Howard	15,621	
15 April	W.L.	The Snuts	20,455	
22 April	Fearless (Taylor's Version)	Taylor Swift	21,145	
29 April	Californian Soil	London Grammar	31,106	
6 May	Surrounded by Time	Tom Jones	14,936	
13 May	Typhoons	Royal Blood	32,000	
20 May	Life By Misadventure	Rag'n'Bone Man	41,855	
27 May	Fat Pop	Paul Weller	26,005	
3 June	Sour	Olivia Rodrigo	50,942	
10 June	Sour	Olivia Rodrigo	32,844	
17 June	Blue Weekend	Wolf Alice	36,182	
24 June	Back the Way We Came: Vol. 1 (2011–2021)	Noel Gallagher's High Flying Birds	28,384	
1 July	Sour	Olivia Rodrigo	20,249	
8 July	Europiana	Jack Savoretti	20,594	
15 July	Sour	Olivia Rodrigo	18,044	
22 July	It Won't Always Be Like This	Inhaler	17,728	
29 July	All Over the Place	KSI	34,328	
5 August	We're All Alone in This Together	Dave	74,191	
12 August	Happier Than Ever	Billie Eilish	38,885	
19 August	We're All Alone in This Together	Dave	15,437	
26 August	Pressure Machine	The Killers	25,110	
2 September	Sour	Olivia Rodrigo	17,476	
9 September	Donda	Kanye West	19,617	
16 September	Certified Lover Boy	Drake	45,651	
23 September	The Ultra Vivid Lament	Manic Street Preachers	27,345	
30 September	Certified Lover Boy	Drake	12,414	
7 October	How Beautiful Life Can Be	The Lathums	16,341	
14 October	Tales from the Script: Greatest Hits	The Script	23,285	
21 October	Seventeen Going Under	Sam Fender	43,717	
28 October	Music of the Spheres	Coldplay	101,045	
4 November	The Lockdown Sessions	Elton John	30,814	
11 November	=	Ed Sheeran	139,107	
18 November	Voyage	ABBA	203,909	
25 November	Red (Taylor's Version)	Taylor Swift	72,319	
2 December	30†	Adele	261,856	
9 December	30†	Adele	102,261	
16 December	30†	Adele	73,212	
23 December	30†	Adele	68,139	
30 December	30†	Adele	70,813	

=== Number-one compilation albums ===
Chart date (week ending)	Album	Chart sales	References
7 January	Now 107		
14 January	The Greatest Showman		
21 January	The Greatest Showman		
28 January	The Greatest Showman		
4 February	The Greatest Showman		
11 February	Now 70s Glam Pop		
18 February	The Greatest Showman		
25 February	The Greatest Showman		
4 March	Now Country		
11 March	Now Country		
18 March	Now The 60s Girls – Then He Kissed Me		
25 March	Now The 60s Girls – Then He Kissed Me		
1 April	The Greatest Showman		
8 April	Now 108	25,876	
15 April	Now 108		
22 April	Now 108		
29 April	Now 12" 80s		
6 May	Now 108		
13 May	Now Eurovision		
20 May	Now 108		
27 May	Now 108		
3 June	80s Rock Down		
10 June	Now Live Forever – The Anthems		
17 June	The Greatest Showman		
24 June	The Greatest Showman		
1 July	The Greatest Showman		
8 July	Now Yearbook 1983	7,679	
15 July	The Greatest Showman		
22 July	Andrew Lloyd Webber's Cinderella		
29 July	Now Gold		
5 August	Now 109	20,886	
12 August	Now 109		
19 August	Now 109		
26 August	Now 109		
2 September	Now 109		
9 September	Now 12" 80s Extended		
16 September	Now 109		
23 September	The Greatest Showman		
30 September	Now Boogie Nights – Disco Classics		
7 October	The Best of Bond... James Bond		
14 October	The Best of Bond... James Bond		
21 October	The Greatest Showman		
28 October	The Greatest Showman		
4 November	The Greatest Showman		
11 November	Now Yearbook 1984		
18 November	Now Rock		
25 November	Dreamboats & Petticoats – Bringing On		
2 December	Now 110	22,712	
9 December	Now 110		
16 December	Now 110		
23 December	Now 110		
30 December	Now 110		

== Year-end charts ==
=== Top singles of the year ===
This chart was published by the Official Charts Company on 4 January 2022

No.	Title	Artist(s)	Peak position	Combined
1	"Bad Habits"	Ed Sheeran	1	
2	"Good 4 U"	Olivia Rodrigo	1	
3	"Drivers License"	Olivia Rodrigo	1	
4	"Save Your Tears"	The Weeknd	2	
5	"Montero (Call Me by Your Name)"	Lil Nas X	1	
6	"Levitating"	Dua Lipa	5	
7	"Stay"	The Kid Laroi and Justin Bieber	2	
8	"Heat Waves"	Glass Animals	5	
9	"Blinding Lights"	The Weeknd	13 (Note: Reached number 1 in 2020)	
10	"Body"	Russ Millions and Tion Wayne	1	
11	"Wellerman (Sea Shanty)"	Nathan Evans, 220 Kid and Billen Ted	1	
12	"Easy on Me"	Adele	1	
13	"Friday"	Riton and Nightcrawlers featuring Mufasa and Hypeman	4	
14	"Kiss Me More"	Doja Cat featuring SZA	3	
15	"Shivers"	Ed Sheeran	1	
16	"The Business"	Tiësto	3	
17	"Head & Heart"	Joel Corry and MNEK	19 (Note: Reached number 1 in 2020)	
18	"Bed"	Joel Corry, Raye and David Guetta	3	
19	"Without You"	The Kid Laroi	2	
20	"Little Bit of Love"	Tom Grennan	7	
21	"Cold Heart"	Elton John and Dua Lipa	1	
22	"Black Magic"	Jonasu	3	
23	"Peaches"	Justin Bieber featuring Daniel Caesar and Giveon	2	
24	"Heartbreak Anthem"	Galantis, David Guetta and Little Mix	3	
25	"Let's Go Home Together"	Ella Henderson and Tom Grennan	10	
26	"Latest Trends"	A1 x J1	2	
27	"Remember"	Becky Hill and David Guetta	3	
28	"Don't Play"	Anne-Marie, KSI and Digital Farm Animals	2	
29	"Your Love (9PM)"	ATB, Topic and A7S	8	
30	"Someone You Loved"	Lewis Capaldi	42 (Note: Reached number 1 in 2019)	
31	"Goosebumps (Remix)"	Travis Scott and Hvme	8	
32	"Deja Vu"	Olivia Rodrigo	4	
33	"Mr. Brightside"	The Killers	61 (Note: Reached number 10 in 2004)	
34	"Last Christmas"	Wham!	1	
35	"Perfect"	Ed Sheeran	57 (Note: Reached number 1 in 2017)	
36	"Paradise"	Meduza featuring Dermot Kennedy	5	
37	"All I Want for Christmas Is You"	Mariah Carey	2 (Note: Reached number 1 in 2020)	
38	"Dance Monkey"	Tones and I	38 (Note: Reached number 1 in 2019)	
39	"Get Out My Head"	Shane Codd	6	
40	"I Wanna Be Your Slave"	Måneskin	5	
41	"Astronaut in the Ocean"	Masked Wolf	12	
42	"Traitor"	Olivia Rodrigo	5	
43	"Watermelon Sugar"	Harry Styles	25 (Note: Reached number 4 in 2020)	
44	"Good Without"	Mimi Webb	8	
45	"Industry Baby"	Lil Nas X and Jack Harlow	3	
46	"Mood"	24kGoldn featuring Iann Dior	16 (Note: Reached number 1 in 2020)	
47	"Sweet Melody"	Little Mix	1	
48	"Calling My Phone"	Lil Tjay and 6lack	2	
49	"Clash"	Dave featuring Stormzy	2	
50	"Streets"	Doja Cat	12	

=== Best-selling albums ===
This chart was published by the Official Charts Company on 4 January 2022

No.	Title	Artist	Peak position	Combined sales
1	30	Adele	1	600,000
2	=	Ed Sheeran	1	432,000
3	Voyage	ABBA	1	400,000
4	Sour	Olivia Rodrigo	1	395,000
5	Greatest Hits	Queen	2 (Note: Reached number 1 in 1981)	
6	Future Nostalgia	Dua Lipa	2 (Note: Reached number 1 in 2020)	
7	÷	Ed Sheeran	7 (Note: Reached number 1 in 2017)	
8	Diamonds	Elton John	8 (Note: Reached number 5 in 2017)	
9	50 Years – Don't Stop	Fleetwood Mac	6 (Note: Reached number 5 in 2019)	
10	We're All Alone in This Together	Dave	1	
11	The Highlights	The Weeknd	2	
12	Fine Line	Harry Styles	2	
13	ABBA Gold	ABBA	5 (Note: Reached number 1 in 1992)	
14	Music of the Spheres	Coldplay	1	
15	Shoot for the Stars, Aim for the Moon	Pop Smoke	4 (Note: Reached number 1 in 2020)	
16	Divinely Uninspired to a Hellish Extent	Lewis Capaldi	6 (Note: Reached number 1 in 2019)	
17	Rumours	Fleetwood Mac	8 (Note: Reached number 1 in 1978)	
18	Planet Her	Doja Cat	3	
19	Curtain Call: The Hits	Eminem	16 (Note: Reached number 1 in 2005)	
20	Life by Misadventure	Rag'n'Bone Man	1	
21	Justice	Justin Bieber	2	
22	Certified Lover Boy	Drake	1	
23	Time Flies... 1994–2009	Oasis	13 (Note: Reached number 1 in 2010)	
24	AM	Arctic Monkeys	19 (Note: Reached number 1 in 2013)	
25	F*ck Love	The Kid Laroi	6	
26	Happier Than Ever	Billie Eilish	1	
27	25	Adele	3 (Note: Reached number 1 in 2015)	
28	(What's the Story) Morning Glory?	Oasis	21 (Note: Reached number 1 in 1995)	
29	Number Ones	Michael Jackson	26 (Note: Reached number 1 in 2003)	
30	Legend	Bob Marley and the Wailers	12 (Note: Reached number 1 in 1984)	
31	Evermore	Taylor Swift	1	
32	Red (Taylor's Version)	Taylor Swift	1	
33	When We All Fall Asleep, Where Do We Go?	Billie Eilish	16 (Note: Reached number 1 in 2019)	
34	1	The Beatles	16 (Note: Reached number 1 in 2000)	
35	High Expectations	Mabel	21 (Note: Reached number 3 in 2019)	
36	Legends Never Die	Juice Wrld	11 (Note: Reached number 1 in 2020)	
37	Dua Lipa	Dua Lipa	23 (Note: Reached number 3 in 2018)	
38	Folklore	Taylor Swift	12 (Note: Reached number 1 in 2020)	
39	The Lockdown Sessions	Elton John	1	
40	Confetti	Little Mix	3 (Note: Reached number 2 in 2020)	
41	Get to Know	Becky Hill	24 (Note: Reached number 20 in 2020)	
42	Legacy (The Very Best of David Bowie)	David Bowie	18 (Note: Reached number 5 in 2017)	
43	Singles	Maroon 5	32	
44	No.6 Collaborations Project	Ed Sheeran	25 (Note: Reached number 1 in 2019)	
45	Seventeen Going Under	Sam Fender	1	
46	All Over the Place	KSI	1	
47	Wild West	Central Cee	2	
48	Without Fear	Dermot Kennedy	17 (Note: Reached number 1 in 2019)	
49	21	Adele	6 (Note: Reached number 1 in 2011)	
50	Positions	Ariana Grande	4 (Note: Reached number 1 in 2020)	
51	Whatever People Say I Am, That's What I'm Not	Arctic Monkeys	36 (Note: Reached number 1 in 2006)	
52	Evering Road	Tom Grennan	1	
53	Twenty Five	George Michael	30 (Note: Reached number 1 in 2006)	
54	Back to Black	Amy Winehouse	7 (Note: Reached number 1 in 2007)	
55	×	Ed Sheeran	27 (Note: Reached number 1 in 2014)	
56	Medicine at Midnight	Foo Fighters	1	
57	Christmas	Michael Bublé	1	
58	Between Us	Little Mix	4	
59	1989	Taylor Swift	43 (Note: Reached number 1 in 2014)	
60	Doo-Wops & Hooligans	Bruno Mars	40 (Note: Reached number 1 in 2011)	
61	Goodbye & Good Riddance	Juice Wrld	23	
62	Hollywood's Bleeding	Post Malone	41 (Note: Reached number 1 in 2019)	
63	After Hours	The Weeknd	19 (Note: Reached number 1 in 2020)	
64	In the Lonely Hour	Sam Smith	32 (Note: Reached number 1 in 2014)	
65	Greatest Hits	Foo Fighters	43 (Note: Reached number 4 in 2009)	
66	?	XXXTentacion	30 (Note: Reached number 3 in 2018)	

== Deaths ==
- 3 January – Gerry Marsden, singer, musician (Gerry and the Pacemakers), 78
- 5 January – John Georgiadis, orchestral violinist and leader, and conductor, 81
- 6 January – Osian Ellis, classical harpist, 92
- 10 January – Mark Keds, singer, musician (Senseless Things), 50
- 29 January – Hilton Valentine, musician, guitarist (The Animals), 77
- 30 January – Sophie, Scottish musician, producer, singer-songwriter, DJ, 34
- 31 January – Eric Wetherell, British conductor, composer and author, 95
- 13 February – Sydney Devine, Scottish singer, entertainer, 81
- 15 February – Steuart Bedford, conductor and specialist in the music of Benjamin Britten, 81
- 22 February – Tony "Feedback" Morrison, musician (Angelic Upstarts), 61, COVID-19
- 2 March
  - Chris Barber, jazz trombonist and bandleader, 90
  - Anna Shuttleworth, classical cellist and pedagogue, 93
- 4 March – Alan Cartwright, English bass musician (Procol Harum), 75, stomach cancer
- 20 March – Robert Gard, classical tenor resident in Australia, 90
- 29 March – Elaine Hugh-Jones, classical composer, 93
- 31 March
  - Jane Manning, classical soprano and advocate of contemporary music, 82
  - Valerie, Lady Solti, classical music philanthropist, former arts journalist, and widow of Sir Georg Solti, 83
- 2 April – Simon Bainbridge, classical composer, 68
- 20 April – Les McKeown, Scottish singer (Bay City Rollers), 65
- 29 April – John Hinch, English drummer (Judas Priest), 73
- 30 April – Anthony Payne, classical composer, 84
- 4 May – Nick Kamen, singer, songwriter, and model, 59
- 5 May – Ray Teret, disc jockey and convicted rapist, 79
- 10 May – Pauline Tinsley, English opera singer, 93
- 15 May – Emily Mair, Scottish-New Zealand opera singer, pianist and vocal coach, 92
- 15 May – Fred Dellar, music journalist, 89
- 20 May – Freddy Marks, television actor and musician (Rod, Jane and Freddy), 71
- 23 June – Peter Zinovieff, engineer (EMS VCS 3) and composer, 88
- 22 July – Peter Rehberg, Austrian-English electronic musician (KTL), heart attack, 53
- 3 August – Allan Stephenson, English-born South African composer, cellist, and conductor, 71
- 6 August – Les Vandyke, English singer and songwriter ("What Do You Want?", "Poor Me", "Well I Ask You"), 90
- 10 August – Stephen Wilkinson, English choral conductor and composer, 102
- 14 August – Hugh Wood, English composer, 89
- 20 August – Peter Ind, jazz double bassist and record producer, 93
- 22 August – Brian Travers, English saxophonist (UB40), 62
- 24 August
  - Fritz McIntyre, English keyboardist (Simply Red), 62
  - Charlie Watts, English drummer (The Rolling Stones), 80
- 25 August – Dave Harper, English drummer (Frankie & The Heartstrings)
- 1 September – Giles Easterbrook, music publisher and composer.
- 5 September – Sarah Harding, singer (Girls Aloud), model and actress, breast cancer, 39
- 8 September – Matthew Strachan, composer and singer-songwriter (Next Door's Baby), 50
- 9 September – Amanda Holden, musician, librettist (Bliss) and translator, 73
- 10 September – Michael Chapman, English singer-songwriter and guitarist (True North), 80
- 15 September – Norman Bailey, British-born opera singer resident in the US, 88
- 20 September
  - Colin Bailey, English-born jazz drummer, 87
  - Julz Sale, English singer-songwriter and guitarist (Delta 5), cancer
- 21 September – Richard H. Kirk, English musician, composer and producer (Cabaret Voltaire), 65
- 26 September – Alan Lancaster, English bassist (Status Quo and The Party Boys), complications from multiple sclerosis, 72
- 28 September – Barry Ryan, English pop singer ("Eloise") and photographer, 72
- 30 September – Greg Gilbert, English singer, guitarist (Delays), bowel cancer, 44
- 2 October – John Rossall, saxophonist (The Glitter Band), cancer, 75
- 5 October – Pat Fish, musician (The Jazz Butcher), 64
- 7 October – Rick Jones, Canadian-born television presenter (Play School, Fingerbobs) and musician (Meal Ticket), oesophageal cancer, 84
- 9 October – Jim Pembroke, English rock musician (Wigwam), 75
- 16 October – Alan Hawkshaw, composer, performer (Grange Hill), (Countdown), pneumonia, 84
- 19 October – Leslie Bricusse, English composer (Willy Wonka & the Chocolate Factory), lyricist ("Goldfinger", "You Only Live Twice") and playwright, Oscar winner (1968, 1983), 90
- 21 October – Bernard Haitink, Dutch conductor active in the UK, 92
- 27 October – Gay McIntyre, Northern Irish jazz musician, 88
- 29 October – Malcolm Dome, English music journalist (Record Mirror, Kerrang!, Metal Hammer), 66
- 31 October – Joan Carlyle, classical soprano, 90
- 6 November
  - Terence "Astro" Wilson, English singer, musician (UB40), 64
  - Andrew Barker, bassist, keyboardist (808 State), 53
- 11 November – Graeme Edge, English drummer, musician (The Moody Blues), 80, metastatic cancer
- 21 November – Gordon Crosse, composer, 83
- 30 November – Pamela Helen Stephen, classical mezzo-soprano, 57
- 2 December – Richard Cole, English music manager (Led Zeppelin), 75
- 5 December – John Miles, English singer and musician ("Music"), 72
- 9 December – Steve Bronski, Scottish musician (Bronski Beat), 61
- 10 December – Thomas "Mensi" Mensforth, English singer (Angelic Upstarts), COVID-19, 65
- 13 December – Toby Slater, English singer, musician (Catch), 42
- 17 December – John Morgan, English drummer (The Wurzels), COVID-19, 80
- 25 December – Janice Long, English radio DJ, presenter, 66
- 31 December – Graham Pauncefort, classical music recording executive and founder of the CRD label, 81

== See also ==
- 2021 in British radio
- 2021 in British television
- 2021 in the United Kingdom
