= List of 2021 deaths in popular music =

This is a list of notable performers of rock music and other forms of popular music, and others directly associated with the music as producers, songwriters, or in other closely related roles, who died in 2021.

== 2021 deaths in popular music ==
Preceded by 2020	List of deaths in popular music 2021	Succeeded by 2022

Name	Age	Date	Location of death	Cause of death
Misty Morgan; Jack Blanchard & Misty Morgan	75	January 1, 2021	Florida, U.S.	Cancer
Mick Bolton; Mott the Hoople, Dexys Midnight Runners	72	January 1, 2021	Hastings, England	Undisclosed
Carlos do Carmo	81	January 1, 2021	Lisbon, Portugal	
Gerry Marsden; Gerry & the Pacemakers	78	January 3, 2021	Arrowe Park, Merseyside, England	Blood infection
Jamie O'Hara; The O'Kanes	70	January 7, 2021	Nashville, Tennessee, U.S.	Cancer
Ed Bruce	81	January 8, 2021	Clarksville, Tennessee, U.S.	Natural causes
Marsha Zazula; Megaforce Records founder	68	January 10, 2021	Clermont, Florida, U.S.	Cancer
John Oakley-Smith; Rhodesian singer	71	January 11, 2021	Mutare, Zimbabwe	Murder
Francesco Magni Italian singer-songwriter, who participated in the 1980 Sanremo Festival with the song "Voglio l'erba voglio"	71	January 12, 2021	Briosco, Monza-Brianza, Italy	
Tim Bogert; Beck, Bogert & Appice, Vanilla Fudge, Cactus	76	January 13, 2021	Simi Valley, California, U.S.	Cancer
Sylvain Sylvain; New York Dolls	69	January 13, 2021	Nashville, Tennessee, U.S.	Cancer
Phil Spector; Record producer	81	January 16, 2021	San Joaquin, California, U.S.	COVID-19 Spector was serving time at California Health Care Facility for the Murder of Lana Clarkson
Jason Cope; The Steel Woods	43	January 16, 2021	Nashville, Tennessee, U.S.	Complications from diabetes
Jimmie Rodgers	87	January 18, 2021	Palm Desert, California, U.S.	Heart attack
Ronnie Nasralla; Record producer from Byron Lee and the Dragonaires	90	January 20, 2021	Atlanta, Georgia, U.S.	Natural causes
Roberto Brivio Italian actor, singer, cabaret artist and chansonnier, member of the group I Gufi	82	January 22, 2021	Monza, Italy	COVID-19
Hilton Valentine; The Animals	77	January 29, 2021	Connecticut, U.S.	Undisclosed
Sophie	34	January 30, 2021	Athens, Greece	Accidental fall
Double K People Under the Stairs	43	January 30, 2021	Los Angeles, California, U.S.	Unknown
David Donato; Black Sabbath, White Tiger	66	February 2, 2021	Forest Lawn Memorial-Parks in Cypress, California, U.S.	Unknown
Jim Weatherly	77	February 3, 2021	Brentwood, Tennessee, U.S.	Natural causes
Stefan Cush; The Men They Couldn't Hang	60	February 4, 2021	South Wales	Heart attack
Örs Siklósi; AWS	29	February 5, 2021	Budapest, Hungary	Leukaemia
Mary Wilson; The Supremes	76	February 8, 2021	Las Vegas, Nevada, U.S.	Hypertensive heart disease
Chick Corea; Return to Forever, Chick Corea Elektric Band	79	February 9, 2021	Tampa Bay, Florida, U.S.	Cancer
Cedrick Cotton; Ideal	46	February 9, 2021	Houston, Texas, U.S.	Stabbing
Jon Mark; Mark-Almond, John Mayall	77	February 10, 2021	Rotorua, New Zealand	Unknown
Louis Clark; Music arranger from Electric Light Orchestra	73	February 13, 2021	Elyria, Ohio, U.S.	Kidney failure
Enrico Greppi (Erriquez) Italian singer-songwriter, guitarist and record producer, leader of the Florentine folk group Bandabardò	60	February 14, 2021	Fiesole, Florence, Italy	Long illness
Françoise Cactus; Stereo Total, Lolitas	57	February 17, 2021	Berlin, Germany	Breast cancer
U-Roy	78	February 17, 2021	Kingston, Jamaica	Kidney failure
Andrea Lo Vecchio Italian singer-songwriter and composer	78	February 17, 2021	Rome, Italy	
Prince Markie Dee; The Fat Boys	52	February 18, 2021	Miami, Florida, U.S.	Died on his near 53th birthday of congestive heart failure
James Burke; The Five Stairsteps	70	February 19, 2021	Pennsylvania, U.S.	Pneumonia
Đorđe Balašević; Rani Mraz	67	February 19, 2021	Novi Sad, Serbia	
Scott Pettersen; Backwater	64	February 21, 2021	Austin, Texas, U.S.	Cancer
Viktoras Michnevičius; Member of Sel	47	February 24, 2021	Lithuania	Undisclosed
Bob James; Swan, Montrose, Magnet	68	February 26, 2021	Las Vegas, Nevada, U.S.	Ulcer complications
Anna Kast; Little Big	39	February 28, 2021	St. Petersburg, Russia	Infection
Ian North; Milk 'N' Cookies	68	February 28, 2021	Sarasota, Florida, U.S.	Heart attack
Bunny Wailer; The Wailers	73	March 2, 2021	Kingston, Jamaica	Complications from a stroke
Claudio Coccoluto Italian disc jockey	59	March 2, 2021	Cassino, Italy	Long battle with a serious illness
Alan Cartwright; Procol Harum	75	March 4, 2021	Enfield/Edmonton area of North London, England	Stomach cancer
Michael Stanley	72	March 5, 2021	Cleveland, Ohio, U.S.	Lung cancer
James MacGaw; Magma	52	March 8, 2021	Rezé, France	Brain tumour
James Levine American conductor	77	March 9, 2021	Palm Springs, California, U.S.	Natural causes
Ray Campi	86	March 11, 2021	U.S.	Unknown
Raoul Casadei Italian musician and composer	83	March 13, 2021	Cesena, Italy	COVID-19
Reggie Warren; Troop	52	March 14, 2021	Pasadena, California, U.S.	Cause not disclosed
Doug Parkinson; Fanny Adams, The Life Organisation	74	March 15, 2021	Northern Beaches, Sydney, New South Wales, Australia	Undisclosed
Matt "Money" Miller; Titus Andronicus	34	March 17, 2021	Glen Rock, New Jersey, U.S.	Unknown
Corey Steger; Underoath	42	March 17, 2021	Yulee, Florida, U.S.	Traffic collision
Dan Sartain	39	March 20, 2021	Birmingham, Alabama, U.S.	Unknown
Malcolm Cecil; Record producer from Tonto's Expanding Head Band	84	March 28, 2021	Saugerties, Valhalla, New York, U.S	Unknown
Oscar Kraal; Niels Geusebroek, Van Dik Hout, Milow	50	April 1, 2021	Netherlands	Pancreatic cancer
Patrick Juvet	70	April 1, 2021	Barcelona, Catalonia, Spain	Cardiac arrest
B.B. Dickerson; War	71	April 2, 2021	Long Beach, California, U.S.	A long, undisclosed illness
Ralph Schuckett; Utopia	73	April 3, 2021	Los Angeles, California, U.S.	Unknown
Paul Humphrey; Blue Peter	61	April 4, 2021	Toronto, Ontario, Canada	Multiple system atrophy
DMX	50	April 9, 2021	White Plains, New York, U.S.	Heart attack leading to organ failure
Bob Porter; American Hall of Fame record producer, discographer and broadcaster	80	April 10, 2021	Northvale, New Jersey, U.S.	Esophageal cancer
Bosse Skoglund; Peps Persson	85	April 10, 2021	Stockholm, Sweden	Unknown
Ernesto Brancucci (Ermavilo) Italian lyricist, voice actor and singer		April 11, 2021	Rome, Italy	
Leonid Bortkevich; Pesniary	71	April 13, 2021	Minsk, Belarus	Unknown
Emilio Locurcio Italian singer-songwriter and composer	68	April 13, 2021	Turin, Italy	
Rusty Young; Poco	75	April 14, 2021	Davisville, Missouri, U.S.	Heart attack
Evgeniy Ostapenko; Ukrainian-Lithuanian singer	44	April 14, 2021	Klaipėda, Lithuania	Heart failure
Barby Kelly; The Kelly Family	45	April 15, 2021	Belascoáin, Spain	Heart failure
Barry Mason	85	April 16, 2021	London, England	Unknown
Mike Mitchell; The Kingsmen	77	April 16, 2021	Oregon, U.S.	Died on his 77th birthday of unknown cause
Lew Lewis; Eddie and the Hot Rods	67	April 17, 2021	UK	Unknown
Paul Oscher	71	April 18, 2021	Austin, Texas, U.S.	COVID-19
Lars Ratz; Metalium	53	April 18, 2021	Vilafranca de Bonany, Mallorca, Spain	Ultralight crash
Jim Steinman	73	April 19, 2021	Danbury, Connecticut, U.S.	Kidney failure
Les McKeown; Bay City Rollers	65	April 20, 2021	London, England	Suspected heart attack
Joe Long; The Four Seasons	88	April 21, 2021	Long Beach, New Jersey, U.S.	COVID-19
Shock G Digital Underground	57	April 22, 2021	Tampa, Florida, U.S.	Accidental overdose
Milva Italian singer and actress	81	April 23, 2021	Milan, Italy	Neurodegenerative disease (not related to Alzheimer's), which had affected her since 2009
Shunsuke Kikuchi Musician	89	April 24, 2021	Tokyo, Japan	Aspiration pneumonia
Denny Freeman	76	April 25, 2021	Austin, Texas, U.S.	Abdominal cancer
Al Schmitt; Recording engineer for RCA Records, Capitol Studios	91	April 26, 2021	Bell Canyon, California, U.S.	Unknown
Paul Couter; TC Matic	72	April 27, 2021	Ghent, Belgium	Cancer
Anita Lane; The Birthday Party, Nick Cave and the Bad Seeds	61	April 28, 2021	Melbourne, Victoria, Australia	Unknown
John Hinch; Judas Priest, Bakerloo	73	April 29, 2021	London, England	Unknown
Tony Markellis; Trey Anastasio Band	68	April 29, 2021	Saratoga Springs, New York, U.S.	Unknown
Will Mecum; Karma to Burn, Year Long Disaster	48	April 29, 2021	Morgantown, West Virginia, U.S.	Accidental fall
Wondress; Mantronix	56	May 1, 2021	Charleston, South Carolina, U.S.	Unknown
Phil Naro; Singer for Talas	63	May 3, 2021	Rochester, New York, United States	Tongue cancer
Lloyd Price	88	May 3, 2021	New Rochelle, New York, U.S.	Natural causes
Nick Kamen	59	May 4, 2021	London, England	Bone marrow cancer.
Pervis Staples; The Staple Singers	85	May 6, 2021	Dolton, Illinois, U.S.	Undisclosed causes
Tawny Kitaen; Whitesnake video actress	59	May 7, 2021	Newport Beach, California, U.S.	Dilated cardiomyopathy
Arturo Testa Musician	88	May 12, 2021	Milan, Italy	
Franco Battiato	76	May 18, 2021	Milo, Catania, Italy	
Alix Dobkin	80	May 19, 2021	Woodstock, New York, U.S.	Stroke
Roger Hawkins	75	May 20, 2021	Sheffield, Alabama, U.S.	Undisclosed
Florian Pilkington-Miksa; Curved Air	70	May 20, 2021	South Coast area of England, UK	Pneumonia
Lorrae Desmond	91	May 23, 2021	Gold Coast, Queensland, Australia	Unknown
John Davis; Milli Vanilli	66	May 24, 2021	Nuremberg, Germany	COVID-19
Søren Holm; Liss	25	25 May 2021	Denmark	Unknown
B. J. Thomas	78	May 29, 2021	Arlington, Texas, U.S.	Lung cancer
Phil Johnstone	63	May 31, 2021	City of Exeter, Devon, England	Died after long battle with undisclosed illness
Lil Loaded	20	May 31, 2021	Dallas, Texas, U.S.	Suicide by gunshot
Michele Merlo	28	June 6, 2021	Bologna, Italy	Fulminant leukemia
David C. Lewis; Ambrosia, Shadowfax	68	June 7, 2021	Agua Dulce, California, U.S.	Brain cancer
Don Hill; Saxophonist for The Treniers	99	June 18, 2021	His residence, Las Vegas, Nevada, U.S.	Unknown
Takeshi Terauchi	82	June 18, 2021	Yokohama, Japan	Pneumonia
Ellen McIlwaine	75	June 23, 2021	Calgary, Canada	Esophageal cancer
Wes	57	June 25, 2021	Paris, France	Infection
Johnny Solinger; Skid Row	55	June 26, 2021	Dallas, Texas, U.S.	Liver failure
Jon Hassell	84	June 26, 2021	Los Angeles, California, U.S.	Natural causes
Peps Persson; Blues Quality, Peps Blodsband	74	June 27, 2021	Vittsjö, Sweden	Unknown
Bryan St. Pere; Hum, Castor	52	June 29, 2021	Evansville, Indiana, U.S.	Unknown
John Lawton; Uriah Heep, Lucifer's Friend, Les Humphries Singers	74	June 29, 2021	Bulgaria	Unknown
Steve Kekana	62	July 1, 2021	Johannesburg, South Africa	COVID-19 related complications
Sanford Clark	85	July 4, 2021	Joplin, Missouri, U.S.	COVID-19 during cancer treatment
Rick Laird; Mahavishnu Orchestra	80	July 4, 2021	New City, New York, U.S.	Lung cancer
Raffaella Carrà	78	July 5, 2021	Rome, Italy	Lung cancer
Andy Williams; Drummer for Casting Crowns	49	July 9, 2021	Nashville, Tennessee, U.S.	Motorcycle accident
Jeff LaBar; Cinderella	58	July 14, 2021	Nashville, Tennessee, U.S.	Undisclosed
Gary Corbett; Keyboardist for Cinderella, Kiss	62	July 15, 2021	Hendersonville, Tennessee, U.S.	Aggressive lung cancer
Pyotr Mamonov; Zvuki Mu	70	July 15, 2021	Moscow, Russia	COVID-19
Biz Markie; Juice Crew	57	July 16, 2021	Baltimore, Maryland, U.S.	Complications from diabetes
Robby Steinhardt; Kansas	71	July 17, 2021	Tampa, Florida, U.S.	Complications from pancreatitis
James Weatherstone; The Demics	63	July 18, 2021	His residence, London, Ontario, Canada	Unknown
Raimundas Narsas; Vocalist for Nars	56	July 23, 2021	Lithuania	
Joey Jordison; Slipknot	46	July 26, 2021	Waukee, Dallas County in the state of Iowa, U.S.	Acute transverse myelitis
Mike Howe; Metal Church	55	July 26, 2021	Eureka, California, U.S.	Suicide by hanging
Gianni Nazzaro Italian singer and actor	72	July 27, 2021	Rome, Italy	Lung cancer
Dusty Hill; ZZ Top	72	July 28, 2021	Houston, Texas, U.S.	Complications from bursitis
Johnny Ventura	81	July 28, 2021	Santiago, Dominican Republic	Heart attack
Lilly Bonato Italian singer	74	July 28, 2021	Barlassina, Italy	
Paul Cotton; Poco	78	July 31, 2021	Eugene, Oregon, U.S.	Unknown
Paul Johnson	50	August 4, 2021	Evergreen Park, Illinois, U.S.	COVID-19
Dennis "Dee Tee" Thomas; Kool & the Gang	70	August 7, 2021	New Jersey, U.S.	Natural causes
Joey Ambrose; Bill Haley & His Comets	87	August 9, 2021	Henderson, Nevada, U.S.	Unknown
Nanci Griffith	68	August 13, 2021	Nashville, Tennessee, U.S.	Cancer
Charli Britton "Edward H. Dafis"	68	August 14, 2021	Bangor, Gwynedd	Unknown
Gary "Chicken" Hirsh; Country Joe and the Fish	81	August 17, 2021	Ashland, Oregon, U.S.	Unknown
Ian Carey	45	August 20, 2021	Miami, Florida, U.S.	Unknown
Tom T. Hall	85	August 20, 2021	Franklin, Tennessee, U.S.	Suicide by gunshot wounds
Don Everly; The Everly Brothers	84	August 21, 2021	Nashville, Tennessee, U.S.	Unknown
Micki Grant	90	August 22, 2021	New York City, New York, U.S.	Unknown
Brian Travers; UB40	62	August 22, 2021	Birmingham, England	Cancer
Eric Wagner; Trouble, The Skull, Probot	62	August 23, 2021	Las Vegas, Nevada, U.S.	COVID-19
Olli Wisdom; Specimen	63	August 23, 2021	London, England	Unknown
Charlie Watts; The Rolling Stones	80	August 24, 2021	London, England	Undisclosed
Kenny Malone	83	August 26, 2021	Nashville, Tennessee, U.S.	COVID-19
Lee "Scratch" Perry; The Upsetters, Producer	85	August 29, 2021	Lucea, Jamaica	An unspecified illness
Ron Bushy; Iron Butterfly	79	August 29, 2021	Santa Monica, California, U.S.	Esophageal cancer
Marty Fried; The Cyrkle	77	September 1, 2021	U.S.	Pancreatic cancer
Timo Kaltio; Hanoi Rocks, Cheap & Nasty, Cherry Bombz	61	September 2, 2021	Helsinki, Finland	Unknown
Rickie Lee Reynolds; Black Oak Arkansas	72	September 5, 2021	Memphis, Tennessee, U.S.	Kidney failure and cardiac arrest
Sarah Harding; Girls Aloud	39	September 5, 2021	Manchester, England	Breast cancer
Michael Chapman	80	September 10, 2021	Greenhead, Northumbria, England	Unknown
María Mendiola; Baccara	69	September 11, 2021	Madrid, Spain	Cancer
Giulia Daneo Lorimer Italian musician, violinist and singer	89	September 11, 2021	Scandicci, Italy	
Ron Leejack; Wicked Lester, Cactus	78	September 12, 2021	New Brunswick, New Jersey, U.S.	Unknown
David Stenshoel; Boiled in Lead	71	September 16, 2021	Minnetonka, Minnesota, U.S.	Squamous cell carcinoma of the gingiva
Marina Tucaković; Serbian musician and member of Zana	67	September 19, 2021	Belgrade, Serbia	Breast cancer
Silvano Bussotti "Sylvano" Italian composer and artist	89	September 19, 2021	Milan, Italy	
Sarah Dash; LaBelle	76	September 20, 2021	Trenton, New Jersey, U.S.	Heart failure
Richard H. Kirk; Cabaret Voltaire	65	September 21, 2021	UK	Unknown
Bob Moore	88	September 22, 2021	U.S.	Unknown
Pee Wee Ellis; James Brown Band	80	September 24, 2021	Somerset, England	Unknown
Alan Lancaster; Status Quo	72	September 26, 2021	Sydney, Australia	Multiple sclerosis
George Frayne; Commander Cody and His Lost Planet Airmen	77	September 26, 2021	Saratoga Springs, New York, U.S.	Esophageal cancer
Andrea Martin	49	September 27, 2021	New York City, U.S.	Undisclosed
Barry Ryan	72	September 28, 2021	England	Lung disorder
Hayko Armenian singer and songwriter	48	September 29, 2021	Yerevan, Armenia	Pulmonary complications related to COVID-19
Greg Gilbert; Delays	44	September 30, 2021	Southampton, England	Bowel cancer
Ghanashyam Nayak	77	October 3, 2021	Mumbai, India	Cancer
Pat Fish; The Jazz Butcher	64	October 5, 2021	Northampton, England	Heart attack
Dee Pop; Bush Tetras, The Gun Club	65	October 9, 2021	Brooklyn, New York, U.S.	Heart failure
Misko Barbara; Dead Rooster	49	October 11, 2021	Lviv, Ukraine	Cardiac arrest
Paddy Moloney; The Chieftains	83	October 11, 2021	Dublin, Ireland	Unknown
Andrea Meyer; Cradle of Filth, Nebelhexe	52	October 13, 2021	Kongsberg, Norway	Murdered in bow and arrow attack
Toby Slater; Catch, Brattish	42	October 13, 2021	London, England	Unknown
Ron Tutt	83	October 16, 2021	Franklin, Tennessee, U.S.	Unknown
Einár	19	October 21, 2021	Stockholm, Sweden	Murdered by gunshot
Jay Black; Jay and the Americans	82	October 22, 2021	Queens, New York City, U.S.	Pneumonia
Willie Cobbs	89	October 25, 2021	North Little Rock, Arkansas, U.S.	
Alvin "Seeco" Patterson; Wailers	90	November 1, 2021	Kingston, Jamaica	Unknown
Ronnie Wilson; The Gap Band	73	November 2, 2021	His residence, Tulsa, Oklahoma, U.S.	Stroke
Marília Mendonça	26	November 5, 2021	Minas Gerais, Brazil	Plane crash
Terence "Astro" Wilson; UB40	64	November 6, 2021	England	Allergic reaction
Andrew Barker; 808 State	53	November 6, 2021	Manchester, England	Unknown
Graeme Edge; The Moody Blues	80	November 11, 2021	Bradenton, Florida, U.S.	Metastatic cancer
John Goodsall; Brand X, Atomic Rooster, The Fire Merchants	68	November 11, 2021	Rochester, Minnesota, U.S	Unknown
Young Dolph	36	November 17, 2021	Memphis, Tennessee, U.S.	Murdered
Benone Sinulescu Romanian singer and musician	84	November 18, 2021	Arad, Romania	Aspiration pneumonia
Jim Gallagher; The Astronauts	78	November 20, 2021	U.S.	Unknown
Billy Hinsche; Dino, Desi, and Billy, The Beach Boys	70	November 20, 2021	Henderson, Nevada, U.S.	Lung cancer
David Longdon; Big Big Train	56	November 20, 2021	Nottingham, England	Accidental fall
Gared O'Donnell; Planes Mistaken for Stars	44	November 25, 2021	Peoria, Illinois, U.S.	Esophegal cancer
Alexander Borisovich Gradsky Russian singer and composer	72	November 28, 2021	Moscow, Russia	
Melvin Parker	77	December 3, 2021	Baltimore, Maryland, U.S.	Unknown
Stonewall Jackson	89	December 4, 2021	Nashville, Tennessee, U.S.	Vascular dementia
Toni Santagata Italian singer-songwriter	85	December 5, 2021	Rome, Italy	
John Miles; The Alan Parsons Project	72	December 5, 2021	Newcastle upon Tyne, England	Unknown
János Kóbor; Omega	79	December 6, 2021	Budapest, Hungary	COVID-19
Robbie Shakespeare; Sly and Robbie	68	December 8, 2021	Miami, Florida, U.S.	Kidney failure
Benny Cotton; The Dozier Boys	93	December 8, 2021	New Hope, Minnesota, U.S.	
Gil Bridges; Rare Earth	80	December 8, 2021	West Bloomfield, Detroit, Michigan, U.S.	COVID-19
David Lasley; Chic	74	December 9, 2021	Grand Rapids, Michigan, U.S.	Unknown
Steve Bronski; Bronski Beat	61	December 9, 2021	Soho, London, England	House fire
Michael Nesmith; The Monkees	78	December 10, 2021	Carmel Valley, California, U.S.	Natural causes
Vicente Fernández	81	December 12, 2021	Guadalajara, Mexico	Complications from injuries
Joe Simon	85	December 13, 2021	Buffalo Grove, Illinois, Chicago, U.S.	
Wanda Young; The Marvelettes	78	December 15, 2021	Garden City, Michigan, U.S.	COPD
John Morgan; The Wurzels	80	December 17, 2021	Gloucester, England	COVID-19
Drakeo the Ruler	28	December 18, 2021	Los Angeles, California, United States	Stabbing
Kangol Kid; UTFO	55	December 18, 2021	Manhasset, New York, U.S.	Colon cancer
Billy Conway; Morphine	65	December 19, 2021	Hopkinton, New Hampshire, United States	Liver cancer
Ron Anderson vocal coach	75	December 19, 2021	Palm Beach Gardens, Florida, U.S.	Undisclosed cause
Carlos Marín; Il Divo	53	December 19, 2021	Manchester, England	COVID-19
Luboš Andršt; Framus Five, Energit, Jazz Q	73	December 20, 2021	Prague, Czech Republic	Undisclosed cause
John Hartman; The Doobie Brothers	71	December 29, 2021	Santa Rosa, California, U.S.	Unknown

== See also ==
- List of deaths in rock and roll
- List of murdered hip hop musicians
- 27 Club
