= List of 2020 deaths in popular music =

This is a list of notable performers of rock music and other forms of popular music, and others directly associated with the music as producers, songwriters, or in other closely related roles, who died in 2020.

== 2020 deaths in popular music ==
Preceded by 2019	List of deaths in popular music 2020	Succeeded by 2021

Name	Age	Date	Location of death	Cause of death
Lexii Alijai	21	January 1, 2020	Minneapolis, Minnesota, U.S.	Fentanyl and ethanol overdose
Marty Grebb; The Buckinghams	74	January 1, 2020	Kalamazoo, Michigan, U.S.	Unknown
Tommy Hancock	90	January 1, 2020	Austin, Texas, U.S.	Unknown
Lorraine Chandler	73	January 2, 2020	Detroit, Michigan, U.S.	Undisclosed causes
Bo Winberg; The Spotnicks	80	January 3, 2020	Gothenburg, Sweden	Unknown
Franco Ciani Italian lyricist, record producer and singer-songwriter	62	January 3, 2020	Fidenza, Italy	
Martin Griffin; Ark, Sonic Assassins, Hawklords, Hawkwind	69	January 6, 2020	West Devon, England	Unknown
Neil Peart; Rush	67	January 7, 2020	Santa Monica, California, U.S.	Glioblastoma
Edd Byrnes	87	January 8, 2020	Santa Monica, California, U.S.	Natural causes
Bobby Comstock	78	January 9, 2020	California, U.S.	Unknown
Tom Alexander; The Alexander Brothers	85	January 9, 2020	Glasgow, Scotland	Unknown
Marc Morgan	57	January 10, 2020	Huy, Belgium	Unknown
Alana Filippi	59	January 11, 2020	Le Coudray, Chartes, France	Unknown
Steve Martin Caro; The Left Banke	71	January 14, 2020	Dayton, Ohio, U.S.	Heart disease
Chris Darrow; Kaleidoscope, Nitty Gritty Dirt Band	75	January 15, 2020	Los Angeles, California, U.S.	Complications from a stroke
David Olney	71	January 18, 2020	Fort Walton Beach, Florida, U.S.	Heart attack
Robert Parker	89	January 19, 2020	Roseland, Louisiana, U.S.	Natural causes
Meritxell Negre; Peaches & Herb	48	January 21, 2020	Barcelona, Spain	Cancer
Joe Payne; Divine Heresy, Nile	35	January 24, 2020	Tampa, Florida, U.S.	Undisclosed cause
Sean Reinert; Cynic, Death, Æon Spoke	48	January 24, 2020	San Bernardino, California, U.S.	Aortic rupture
Narciso Parigi Italian singer and actor	92	January 25, 2020	Florence, Italy	
Reed Mullin; Corrosion Of Conformity; Teenage Time Killers	53	January 27, 2020	Raleigh, North Carolina, U.S.	Unknown
Bob Nave; The Lemon Pipers	75	January 28, 2020	Dayton, Ohio, U.S.	Unknown
Andy Gill; Gang of Four	64	February 1, 2020	London, England	Pneumonia and multiple organ failure
Josh Pappé; Dirty Rotten Imbeciles; Gang Green	53	February 1, 2020	Texas, U.S.	Unknown
Ivan Král; Patti Smith Group	71	February 2, 2020	Ann Arbor, Michigan, U.S.	Cancer
Buddy Cage; New Riders of the Purple Sage	73	February 5, 2020	Connecticut, U.S.	Multiple myeloma
Lynn Evans Mand; The Chordettes	95	February 6, 2020	Youngstown, Ohio, U.S.	Possible natural causes
Steve Weber; The Holy Modal Rounders	76	February 7, 2020	Mount Clare, West Virginia, U.S.	Cause not disclosed
Lyle Mays; Pat Metheny Group	66	February 10, 2020	Los Angeles, California, U.S.	Died after battling an undisclosed illness
Joseph Shabalala; Ladysmith Black Mambazo	79	February 11, 2020	Pretoria, South Africa	Natural causes
Paul English	87	February 12, 2020	Dallas, Texas, U.S.	Pneumonia
Jacob Thiele; The Faint	40	February 13, 2020	Omaha, Nebraska, United States	Cause not revealed
Henry Gray	95	February 17, 2020	Baton Rouge, Louisiana, U.S.	Unknown
Andrew Weatherall	56	February 17, 2020	London, England	Pulmonary embolism
Pop Smoke	20	February 19, 2020	Los Angeles, California, U.S.	Shot
Elyse Weinberg	74	February 20, 2020	Ashland, Oregon, U.S.	Lung cancer
David Roback; Mazzy Star	61	February 25, 2020	Los Angeles, California, U.S.	Metastatic cancer
Mike Somerville; Head East	67	February 28, 2020	Wausau, Wisconsin, United States	Undisclosed illness
Simon Posthuma; The Fool	81	February 28, 2020	Amsterdam, Netherlands	Korsakoff syndrome
Nelė Paltinienė; Lithuanian Pop singer and member of Kopų Balsai	91	February 29, 2020	Mannheim, Germany	Pneumonia
Elisabetta Imelio Italian musician, singer and member of Prozac+	44	February 29, 2020	Aviano, Pordenone, Italy	Cancer (liver cancer, metastatic after a long battle with breast cancer)
Barbara Martin; The Supremes	76	March 4, 2020	Detroit, Michigan, U.S.	Unknown
McCoy Tyner; John Coltrane Quartet	81	March 6, 2020	Bergenfield, New Jersey, U.S.	Undisclosed causes
Charlie Baty; Little Charlie & the Nightcats	66	March 6, 2020	Vacaville, California, U.S.	Heart attack
Eric Taylor	70	March 9, 2020	Austin, Texas, U.S.	Liver disease
Keith Olsen; Record producer and sound engineer from The Music Machine	74	March 9, 2020	Geona, Nevada, U.S.	Cardiac arrest
Genesis P-Orridge; Throbbing Gristle, Psychic TV	70	March 14, 2020	New York City, New York, U.S.	Leukaemia
Phil Phillips	94	March 14, 2020	Lake Charles, Louisiana, U.S.	Unknown/Died on his 94th birthday
Jason Rainey; Sacred Reich	53	March 16, 2020	Phoenix, Scottsdale, Arizona, U.S.	Heart attack
Kenny Rogers; Kenny Rogers and The First Edition	81	March 20, 2020	Sandy Springs, Georgia, U.S.	Natural causes
Jerry Slick; The Great Society	80	March 20, 2020	Mill Valley, California, U.S.	Unknown
Julie Felix	81	March 22, 2020	Chorleywood, UK	Undisclosed illness
Gabi Delgado; Deutsch Amerikanische Freundschaft	61	March 22, 2020	Either in Portugal or in Spain	Heart attack
Manu Dibango	86	March 24, 2020	Melun, France	COVID-19
Bill Rieflin; King Crimson, R.E.M.	59	March 24, 2020	Seattle, Washington, United States	Cancer
Detto Mariano Italian composer, arranger, lyricist, pianist, record producer, and music publisher	82	March 25, 2020	Milan, Italy	
Neil Landon; The Ivy League, Fat Mattress	78	March 26, 2020	Hamburg, Germany	Cancer
Bob Andy	75	March 27, 2020	Kingston, Jamaica	Cancer
Joe Diffie	61	March 27, 2020	Nashville, Tennessee, U.S.	COVID-19
Mirna Doris Italian singer	79	March 27, 2020	Naples, Italy	
Lou "L.A." Kouvaris; Riot	66	March 28, 2020	Bethpage, New York, U.S.	COVID-19
Alan Merrill; Arrows	69	March 29, 2020	Manhattan, New York City, New York, U.S.	COVID-19
Bill Withers	81	March 30, 2020	Los Angeles, California, U.S.	Heart complications
Cristina; Singer with ZE Records	64	March 31, 2020	New York City, New York, U.S.	COVID-19
Wallace Roney; Jazz trumpeter	59	March 31, 2020	Paterson, New Jersey, U.S.	COVID-19
Adam Schlesinger; Fountains of Wayne, Ivy	52	April 1, 2020	Poughkeepsie, New York, U.S.	COVID-19
Vaughan Mason; Vaughan Mason & Crew	69	April 3, 2020	New York City, New York, U.S.	Unknown
Patrick Gibson; The Gibson Brothers	64	April 4, 2020	Paris, France	COVID-19
Luis Eduardo Aute	76	April 4, 2020	Madrid, Spain	
John Prine	73	April 7, 2020	Nashville, Tennessee, U.S.	COVID-19
Hutch Davie; Songwriter and arranger	89	April 7, 2020	West Orange, New Jersey, U.S.	Unknown
Steve Farmer; The Amboy Dukes	71	April 7, 2020	Redford, Michigan, U.S.	Died at his home, unspecified cause
Glenn Fredly	44	April 8, 2020	Jakarta, Indonesia	Meningitis
Carl Dobkins Jr.	79	April 8, 2020	Mason, Ohio, United States	Unknown
Moraes Moreira; Novos Baianos	72	April 13, 2020	Rio de Janeiro, Brazil	
Ryo Kawasaki	73	April 13, 2020	Tallinn, Estonia	
Kenny Young; Songwriter and member of Fox	79	April 14, 2020	Banbury, Oxfordshire, England	Cancer/Died on his 79th birthday
Lee Konitz	92	April 15, 2020	New York City, U.S.	
Christophe	74	April 16, 2020	Brest, Brittany, France	COVID-19
Barney Ales; Music industry executive from Motown Records	85	April 17, 2020	Malibu, California, United States	Unknown
Matthew Seligman; The Soft Boys, Thompson Twins	64	April 17, 2020	London, England	Stroke following COVID-19 infection
Terry Doran; Beatles associate, manager of Grapefruit	80	April 19, 2020	London, England	Parkinson's disease or COVID-19
Ian Whitcomb	78	April 19, 2020	Los Angeles, California, U.S.	Stroke
Ronan O'Rahilly; Founder of Radio Caroline	79	April 20, 2020	Carlingford, County Louth, Ireland	Vascular dementia
Derek Jones; Falling in Reverse	35	April 21, 2020	Las Vegas, Nevada, U.S.	Subdural hematoma
Florian Schneider; Kraftwerk	73	April 21, 2020	Düsseldorf, Germany	Cancer
Hamilton Bohannon	78	April 24, 2020	Atlanta, Georgia, U.S.	
Young Jessie	83	April 27, 2020	Los Angeles, California, U.S.	Unknown
Scott Taylor; Then Jerico	58	April 27, 2020	England	Brain tumor
Bobby Lewis	95	April 28, 2020	Newark, New Jersey, U.S.	Pneumonia
Tavo Limongi; Resorte	52	May 1, 2020	Naucalpan, State of Mexico	Heart attack due to COVID-19 complications
Erwin Prasetya; Dewa 19	48	May 2, 2020	Indonesia	Gastrointestinal bleeding
Dave Greenfield; The Stranglers	71	May 3, 2020	England, UK	COVID-19 induced heart failure
Bob Lander; The Spotnicks	78	May 3, 2020	Sweden	
Millie Small	72	May 5, 2020	London, England	Stroke
Sweet Pea Atkinson; Was (Not Was)	74	May 5, 2020	Los Angeles, California, U.S.	Heart attack
Brian Howe; Ted Nugent, Bad Company	66	May 6, 2020	Lake Placid, Florida, U.S.	Heart attack
Agustín Villegas; Los Solitarios	79	May 6, 2020	Tijuana, Baja California, Mexico	Cardiorespiratory arrest
Little Richard	87	May 9, 2020	Tullahoma, Tennessee, U.S.	Bone cancer
Betty Wright	66	May 10, 2020	Miami, Florida, U.S.	Cancer
Albert One Italian singer	64	May 10, 2020	Pavia, Italy	Lung infection and pneumonia
Moon Martin	69	May 11, 2020	Encino, Los Angeles, California, U.S.	Natural causes
Alberto Carpani	64	May 11, 2020	Portofino, Italy	Pneumonia
Derek Lawrence; Producer of Deep Purple and Wishbone Ash	78	May 13, 2020	Peterborough, England	Cancer
Yoshio	70	May 13, 2020	Mexico City, Distrito Federal, Mexico	COVID-19
Jorge Santana; Malo	68	May 14, 2020	San Rafael, California, U.S.	Natural causes
Ezio Bosso Italian composer and pianist	48	May 14, 2020	Bologna, Italy	Cancer
Phil May; Pretty Things	75	May 15, 2020	Norfolk, England	Complications following hip surgery
Rimantas Stakauskas; Lithuanian singer, producer for Prologas and member of Daumantų Muzikantai	66	May 17, 2020	Kėdainiai, Lithuania	Unknown
Mory Kanté	70	May 22, 2020	Conakry, Guinea	Untreated chronic health problems
Jimmy Cobb; Miles Davis Quintet	91	May 24, 2020	Manhattan, New York City, U.S.	Lung cancer
Al Rex; Bill Haley & His Comets	91	May 25, 2020	Norristown, Pennsylvania, U.S.	Pneumonia
Bob Kulick	70	May 28, 2020	Las Vegas, Nevada, U.S.	Heart disease
Joey Image; Misfits	63	June 1, 2020	Florida, U.S.	Liver cancer
Chris Trousdale; Dream Street	34	June 2, 2020	Burbank, California, U.S.	Died of undisclosed illness
Steve Priest; The Sweet	72	June 4, 2020	Los Angeles, California, U.S.	Died of undisclosed cause, after health failure
Rupert Hine; Record producer from Thinkman, Quantum Jump	72	June 4, 2020	Wiltshire, England	Undisclosed cause, although he had renal cancer and arrhythmia
Frank Bey	74	June 7, 2020	Glenolden, Pennsylvania, U.S.	Undisclosed illness
Bonnie Pointer; The Pointer Sisters	69	June 8, 2020	Los Angeles, California, U.S.	Cardiac arrest
Pau Donés; Jarabe de Palo	53	June 9, 2020	Naut Aran, Catalonia, Spain	Cancer
Paul Chapman; UFO, Lone Star	66	June 9, 2020	Cardiff, Wales, UK	Undisclosed
Ricky Valance	84	June 12, 2020	Skegness, UK	Dementia
Keith Tippett; Centipede, Mujician	72	June 14, 2020	London, England	Pneumonia
Yohan; TST	28	June 16, 2020	South Korea	Unknown cause, possible suicide
Vera Lynn	103	June 18, 2020	Ditchling, East Sussex, England, UK	Pneumonia
Hux Brown; Toots and the Maytals	75	June 18, 2020	Oakland, California, U.S.	Died in a Home Depot parking lot of unknown cause
Huey	32	June 26, 2020	St. Louis, Missouri, U.S.	Shot
Tami Lynn	78	June 26, 2020	New Port Richey, Florida, U.S.	Undisclosed cause
Pete Carr; Muscle Shoals Rhythm Section	70	June 27, 2020	Florence, Alabama, U.S.	Undisclosed cause
Tom Finn; The Left Banke	71	June 27, 2020	New York City, New York, U.S.	Died after long battle with undisclosed illness
Luciano Rondinella Italian singer and actor	86	June 28, 2020	Naples, Italy	
Benny Mardones	73	June 29, 2020	Menifee, California, U.S.	Parkinson's disease
Max Crook	83	July 1, 2020	U.S.	Undisclosed cause
Marvin Brown; The Softones	66	July 3, 2020	At the MedStar Harbor Hospital in Baltimore, Maryland, U.S.	Undisclosed cause
Erika; Lithuanian pop singer	54	July 4, 2020	Kaunas, Lithuania	Choked on stomach content
Charlie Daniels	83	July 6, 2020	Hermitage, Tennessee, U.S.	Stroke
Ennio Morricone	91	July 6, 2020	Rome, Italy	Fractured his femur in a fall
Naya Rivera	33	July 8, 2020	Lake Piru, California, U.S.	Drowning
Rich Priske; Matthew Good Band	52	July 11, 2020	Kelowna, British Columbia, Canada	Heart attack
Judy Dyble; Fairport Convention, Trader Horne	71	July 12, 2020	Oxfordshire, England	Lung cancer
Emitt Rhodes	70	July 19, 2020	Hawthorne, California, United States	Natural causes
Tim Smith; Cardiacs, The Sea Nymphs	59	July 21, 2020	England	Heart attack
Sean O'Mahony; Founder of The Beatles Book and Record Collector	88	July 21, 2020	London, England	
Peter Green; John Mayall & the Bluesbreakers, Fleetwood Mac	73	July 25, 2020	Canvey Island, Essex, UK	
Filippo Calderaro Italian singer and lyricist	84	July 28, 2020	Catania, Italy	
Shmoulik Avigal; Picture, The Rods	65	July 30, 2020	Florida, U.S.	Cancer
Steve Holland; Molly Hatchet	66	August 2, 2020	Georgia, U.S.	Pneumonia following COVID-19 infection
Tony Costanza; Machine Head	52	August 4, 2020	Las Vegas, Bay Area, California, U.S.	
Jan Savage; The Seeds	77	August 5, 2020	Ada, Oklahoma, United States	
Wayne Fontana	74	August 6, 2020	Stockport, England	Cancer
Mark Wirtz; A Teenage Opera	76	August 7, 2020	Springfield, Georgia, U.S.	Pick's disease
Salome Bey	86	August 8, 2020	Toronto, Ontario, Canada	Dementia
Martin Birch; Record producer	71	August 9, 2020	Woking, Surrey, England, UK	
Trini Lopez	83	August 11, 2020	Palm Springs, California, U.S.	COVID-19
Pat Fairley; Marmalade	76	August 11, 2020	Los Angeles, California, U.S.	Undisclosed
Pete Way; UFO, Waysted, Fastway	69	August 14, 2020	Bournemouth, England	Injuries from accident two months earlier
Jack Sherman; Red Hot Chili Peppers	64	August 18, 2020	Los Angeles, California, U.S.	Heart attack
Frankie Banali; Quiet Riot, W.A.S.P.	68	August 20, 2020	Los Angeles, California, U.S.	Pancreatic cancer
Justin Townes Earle	38	August 20, 2020	Nashville, Tennessee, U.S.	Drug overdose
Mike Kirkland; The Brothers Four	82	August 20, 2020	U.S.	Cancer
Walter Lure; The Heartbreakers	71	August 22, 2020	Flushing Hospital, U.S.	Liver and lung cancer
Alessandro Mazzinghi Italian boxer, writer and singer, one of the most beloved athletes by the Italian boxing public	81	August 22, 2020	Pontedera, Italy	Ischemia and worsening of clinical conditions after a short hospital stay
Riley Gale; Power Trip	34	August 24, 2020	Dallas, Texas, U.S.	Drug overdose
Gerry McGhee; Brighton Rock	58	August 25, 2020	Canada	Cancer
Erick Morillo; Reel 2 Real	49	September 1, 2020	Miami Beach, Florida, U.S.	Acute ketamine toxicity
Ian Mitchell; Bay City Rollers	62	September 1, 2020	U.S.	Throat cancer
Simeon Coxe; Silver Apples	82	September 4, 2020	Fairhope, Alabama, U.S.	Pulmonary fibrosis
Lucille Starr	82	September 4, 2020	Las Vegas, Nevada, U.S.	Long illness
Bruce Williamson; The Temptations	49	September 6, 2020	Las Vegas, Nevada, U.S.	COVID-19
Xavier Ortiz; Garibaldi	48	September 6, 2020	Guadalajara, Jalisco, Mexico	Suicide
Ronald Bell; Kool & the Gang	68	September 9, 2020	U.S. Virgin Islands	
Toots Hibbert; Toots & the Maytals	77	September 11, 2020	Kingston, Jamaica	COVID-19
Charles Howard Patrick; The Monotones	82	September 11, 2020	U.S.	Unknown
Edna Wright; Honey Cone	76	September 12, 2020	Encino, California, U.S	
Pamela Hutchinson; The Emotions	61	September 18, 2020	U.S.	Died after a long battle with an undisclosed illness
Lee Kerslake; Uriah Heep, Ozzy Osbourne, Living Loud, Toe Fat	73	September 19, 2020	London, England	Prostate cancer
Tommy DeVito; The Four Seasons	92	September 21, 2020	Las Vegas, U.S.	COVID-19
Roy Head	79	September 21, 2020	Montgomery County, Texas, U.S.	Heart attack
Juliette Gréco	93	September 24, 2020	Ramatuelle, France	
Max Merritt; The Meteors	79	September 24, 2020	Los Angeles, U.S.	Autoimmune disease
Mark Stone; Van Halen	79	September 26, 2020	U.S.	Cancer
Jackie Dennis	77	September 28, 2020	Edinburgh, Scotland, UK	
Mac Davis	78	September 29, 2020	Nashville, Tennessee, U.S.	Complications from heart surgery.
Helen Reddy	78	September 29, 2020	Los Angeles, U.S.	Addison's disease
Gianfranco Lombardi Italian bassist, arranger and conductor	79	October 1, 2020	San Lorenzello, Benevento, Italy	
Eddie Van Halen; Van Halen	65	October 6, 2020	Santa Monica, U.S.	Throat cancer
Johnny Nash	80	October 6, 2020	Houston, U.S.	Natural causes
Brian Locking; The Shadows	82	October 8, 2020	St Kentigern Hospice in St Asaph, Denbighshire, North Wales	Bladder cancer
Dave Munden; The Tremeloes	76	October 15, 2020	England, UK	Respiratory infection
Gordon Haskell; The Fleur de Lys, King Crimson	74	October 16, 2020	Shaftesbury, Dorset, England	Cancer
Chet "JR" White; Girls	40	October 18, 2020	Santa Cruz, California, U.S.	Heart failure
Alfredo Cerruti Italian record producer, television writer, and singer	78	October 18, 2020	Milan, Italy	
José Padilla		October 18, 2020	Ibiza, Balearics, Spain	
Spencer Davis; Spencer Davis Group	81	October 19, 2020	Los Angeles, California, U.S.	Heart attack
Tony Lewis; The Outfield	62	October 19, 2020	London, England	Unknown
Jerry Jeff Walker	78	October 23, 2020	Austin, Texas, U.S.	Throat cancer
Skirmantas Gibavičius Bassist for Bix	52	October 26, 2020	Lithuania	Undisclosed
MF Doom; Madvillain	49	October 31, 2020 (announced on December 31, 2020)	Leeds, England	Angioedema following a reaction to a blood pressure medication
Nikki McKibbin	42	November 1, 2020	Arlington, Texas, U.S.	Brain aneurysm
Gigi Proietti Italian actor, voice actor, singer and television host	80	November 2, 2020	Rome, Italy	Severe heart failure
Tom Wolgers; Lustans Lakejer, Mockba Music	61	November 3, 2020	Stockholm, Sweden	Cancer
Ken Hensley; Uriah Heep, Toe Fat, The Gods, Blackfoot	75	November 4, 2020	Agost, Spain	
Len Barry; The Dovells	78	November 5, 2020	Philadelphia, Pennsylvania, U.S.	Mmyelodysplasia
King Von	26	November 6, 2020	Atlanta, Georgia, U.S.	Shot
Stefano D'Orazio Italian drummer, percussionist, and vocalist for the Italian rock band Pooh	72	November 6, 2020	Rome, Italy	Complications related to COVID-19
Bones Hillman; Midnight Oil	62	November 7, 2020	Milwaukee, Wisconsin, U.S.	Cancer
Cándido Camero	99	November 7, 2020	New York City, U.S.	
Alec Baillie; Leftöver Crack, Choking Victim	44	November 10, 2020	New York City, New York, U.S.	Overdose of heroin, fentanyl, buprenorphine and alprazolam
Jim Tucker; The Turtles	74	November 12, 2020	Grass Valley, California, U.S.	
Henry Slaughter; The Weatherford Quartet, The Imperials, Bill Gaither	93	November 13, 2020	Nashville, Tennessee, U.S.	Complications of COVID-19
Donnie Grant; Guys 'n' Dolls	71	November 18, 2020	Ramsgate, Kent, UK	Abdominal aortic aneurysm
Tony Hooper; Strawbs	81	November 18, 2020	Andover, Hampshire, England	
Linas Rugienius; Member of Tipo Grupė	42	November 30, 2020	Lithuania	Cancer
Eric Pacheco; Babylon A.D.	53	December 6, 2020	Las Vegas, Nevada, U.S.	
Sean Malone; Cynic	50	December 7, 2020	Largo, Florida, U.S.	Suicide
Harold Budd	84	December 8, 2020	Arcadia, California, U.S.	COVID-19
Jason Slater; Third Eye Blind	49	December 9, 2020	Maui, Hawaii, U.S.	Liver failure
Charley Pride	86	December 12, 2020	Dallas, Texas, U.S.	COVID-19
Sam Jayne; Love as Laughter, Lync	46	December 15, 2020	New York City, U.S.	
Clay Anthony; Junkyard	61	December 19, 2020	Maui, Hawaii, U.S.	Car accident
Dieter Horns; Lucifer's Friend	74	December 19, 2020	Germany	Undisclosed cause
Pelle Alsing; Roxette	60	December 20, 2020	Stockholm, Sweden	Undisclosed cause
Chad Stuart; Chad & Jeremy	79	December 20, 2020	Hailey, Idaho, U.S.	Pneumonia
Leslie West; Mountain	75	December 23, 2020	Palm Coast, Florida, U.S.	Heart attack
Geoff Stephens; New Vaudeville Band	86	December 24, 2020	Bedfordshire, England	Pneumonia
Armando Manzanero	85	December 28, 2020	Mexico City, Distrito Federal, Mexico	COVID-19
Phylis McGuire; The McGuire Sisters	89	December 29, 2020	Las Vegas, Nevada, U.S.	Natural causes
Alto Reed; Bob Seger & the Silver Bullet Band	72	December 30, 2020	Detroit, Michigan, U.S.	Colon cancer
Eugene Wright; Jazz Bassist for Dave Brubeck Quartet	97	December 30, 2020	Los Angeles, California, U.S.	Undisclosed
Alexi Laiho; Children of Bodom	41	December 31, 2020	Helsinki, Finland	Complications of alcohol abuse

== See also ==
- List of deaths in popular music
- List of murdered hip hop musicians
- 27 Club
