= Record Collector =

British music magazine

- Cover of issue 558 (June 2024)
- Editor: Paul Lester
- Categories: Music magazine
- Frequency: Four-weekly
- Publisher: Diamond Publishing
- First issue: March 1980
- Country: United Kingdom
- Based in: London
- Language: English
- Website: Recordcollectormag.com
- ISSN: 0261-250X

Record Collector is a British monthly music magazine focusing on rare and collectable records, and the bands who recorded them. It was founded in September 1979 and distributes worldwide. It is promoted as "the world's leading authority on rare and collectable records" and claims to be currently "the UK's longest-running music magazine".

== History ==
Music journalist and publisher Sean O'Mahony, under the pen name Johnny Dean, had published an official Beatles magazine, The Beatles Book (also known as Beatles Monthly), from 1963 to 1969. In May 1976 O'Mahony started reprinting it, enclosing it in eight pages of new information about the Beatles along with small ads, in a magazine he named The Beatles Book Appreciation Society Magazine. The interest shown in the small ads of The Beatles Book Appreciation Society Magazine for records and memorabilia of bands other than the Beatles led O'Mahony to launch Record Collector in Sept 1979, along with a copy of the 41st issue of Beatles Monthly. With issue 7, in March 1980, the Beatles Monthly section was separated from Record Collector and continued to be sold independently.

By June 1980, Record Collector was a glossy A5 publication which ran to no more than 100 pages. With the addition of another editorial staff member – Peter Doggett, who stayed with the magazine for almost 20 years – Record Collector began to take shape and assume its own identity.

In 2003, Record Collector became a full colour publication – marking the fact with a psychedelic special – and printing 13 issues a year. The magazine was updated steadily by editor-In-chief Alan Lewis, former editor of Sounds, NME, Black Music, founding editor of Kerrang! and involved in the launches of both Uncut and Loaded. Lewis left in April 2011 and was replaced by Ian McCann, formerly of NME, Black Echoes and The Independent. His debut came with an issue focused on "the 51 Best Investments in vinyl". In 2017 McCann stepped down as editor and was succeeded by Paul Lester.

== Record Collector 100 Greatest... books ==
In 2005, Record Collector began a series of books that sought to present the top 100 most collectible records of a given genre of music. Each book has been written by a specialist in that field, and investigates the story behind each records in the Top 100, along with accompanying record and label images.

So far, two books have been published, 100 Greatest Psychedelic Records and 100 Greatest Rock'N'Roll Records.

== The Rare Record Price Guide ==
The Rare Record Price Guide (RRPG) features an alphabetical list of all the artists with notable collectables, and then lists each collectible release in chronological order. It includes 78 rpm records, 7-, 10- and 12-inch vinyl singles and EPs, vinyl LPs, and cassette and CD singles and albums.

Each release format has a minimum value, and if a particular release reaches or exceeds that, the RRPG features it, giving the entry full label, catalogue number, A-side and B-side listings (where applicable), distinctive features of the item and price information.

To that it puts a fair, accurate and realistic valuation on each record, which serves as a barometer for buyers and sellers of rare records. All of its valuations are for records in excellent, or 'Mint' condition. Where there are different versions of the same record (for example, a limited number may have been issued in a picture sleeve), then two prices are given, to reflect that difference.

The RRPG is not designed to be a complete discography of a given artist, but a reference for collectors and dealers of collectible records. Its focus is on music released from the 1950s onwards, including various artists compilations and soundtracks. For the majority of the listings, the records have to have been made commercially available in the UK. Exceptions include:

- Releases from the Republic Of Ireland, which were imported into Britain, but not officially issued.
- 'Export Releases' manufactured in the UK in the 1950s and 1960s, and distributed to countries that did not have their own pressing plants.
- Records, flexidiscs, cassettes or CDs included as freebies with magazines, books or other records.
- Promotional releases, demos, test pressings and acetate recordings where they have been made available to the public, contain unique material and/or packaging, or are so important/well known among collectors that they warrant inclusion.

=== The RRPG Online ===
In the April 2010 issue of Record Collector it was announced the Rare Record Price Guide was going online. The online database contains all the latest updates, a live currency converting function, more photos and the ability for users to submit their own content.

Additionally, users can get total collection valuations by adding records in the database to a private "My Collection" section of the site.

== Clarification ==
There is a completely separate and unrelated publication, The Record Collector, first published in 1946, which describes itself as "The Journal for the collector of recordings of the great opera singers of the past."
