= The Beatles Book =

Monthly magazine that ran from 1963 to 2003

- Publisher: Sean O’Mahony
- First issue: August 1963; 62 years ago
- Final issue Number: January 2003; 321

The Beatles Book (also known as Beatles Monthly) was a fan magazine dedicated to the English rock band the Beatles, founded in 1963. It was first published in August 1963 and continued for 77 editions until it stopped publication after the December 1969 edition. It was revived in 1976, and ceased publication in 2003.

== Publication history ==
In early 1963 a music writer and publisher, Sean O’Mahony, (who already published a magazine about the music scene called Beat Instrumental) heard Please Please Me and asked Brian Epstein if he could publish a magazine devoted to the Beatles. Epstein and the group agreed and the title launched in August 1963 with a print run of 80,000. By the end of the year circulation had grown to 330,000 copies per month. O’Mahony edited the magazine under the name of Johnny Dean.

The magazine's photographer, Leslie Bryce, had unrivalled access to the group throughout the 1960s, travelling the world and taking thousands of photographs. In addition, Beatles roadies Neil Aspinall and Mal Evans wrote many of the articles, and artist Bob Gibson created numerous cartoons and caricatures of the fab four on a regular basis. (He eventually did the cartoons for the Beatles' 1967 Magical Mystery Tour EP-set/US-album booklet.)

In May 1976 O’Mahony revived the publication and republished all 77 original issues surrounded by eight (later sixteen) pages of new Beatles news and articles. The reissue programme was completed in September 1982, coincidentally at a time when interest in the band was high due to the impending twentieth anniversary of "Love Me Do". Consequently, the decision was taken to continue the magazine with all new content. Publication continued until January 2003 (issue 321) when it once again ceased.

Sean O'Mahony retired from publishing in 2002 and died in 2020.
