= Gay McIntyre =

Irish jazz musician (1933-2021)

- Born: 28 April 1933; Ballybofey, County Donegal, Ireland
- Died: 27 October 2021 (aged 88); Derry, River Foyle, Northern Ireland
- Genres: Jazz
- Occupations: Musician
- Instruments: Saxophone, Clarinet

George Albert "Gay" McIntyre (28 April 1933 – 27 October 2021) was an Irish jazz musician, based in Derry.

== Early life ==
McIntyre was born on 28 April 1933 in Ballybofey, Donegal, and as a teenager began performing with jazz bands in Donegal and Derry. His father, Willie, and his mother encouraged his interest in music and his father bought him a clarinet.
