= True North (Michael Chapman album) =

Studio album by Michael Chapman
- Released: 8 February 2019
- Studios: Mwnci Studios, Wales
- Length: 44:44
- Label: Paradise of Bachelors
- Producer: Steve Gunn

Michael Chapman chronology
50 (2017)	True North (2019)	Plaindealer + Twisted Road (2020)

Professional ratings
Aggregate scores
Source	Rating
Metacritic	82/100
Review scores
Source	Rating
AllMusic	4/5 stars
Paste	7.2/10
Pitchfork	7.4/10
PopMatters	7/10
Under the Radar	8/10

True North is a studio album by English singer-songwriter Michael Chapman. It was released on 8 February 2019 through Paradise of Bachelors.

== Track listing ==
All tracks are written by Michael Chapman.

No.	Title	Length
1.	"It's Too Late"	4:24
2.	"After All This Time"	4:05
3.	"Vanity & Pride"	3:33
4.	"Eleuthera"	2:49
5.	"Bluesman"	3:34
6.	"Full Bottle, Empty Heart"	3:20
7.	"Truck Song"	6:08
8.	"Caddo Lake"	5:55
9.	"Hell to Pay"	4:13
10.	"Youth Is Wasted on the Young"	4:01
11.	"Bon Ton Roolay"	2:42

== Personnel ==
- Michael Chapman - vocals, guitar, bass
- Steve Gunn - guitar, drums
- Bridget St John - vocals
- B.J. Cole - pedal steel guitar
- Sarah Smout - cello

Technical

- Jimmy Robertson - recording, mixing

== Charts ==
Chart	Peak position
UK Americana Albums (Official Charts)	1
UK Independent Albums (Official Charts)	16
