= Sean O'Mahony (journalist) =

British music writer and magazine editor (1932–2020)

- Born: 1932; London, England
- Died: 21 July 2020 (aged 88)
- Other name: Johnny Dean
- Occupations: Music journalist, magazine editor

Sean O'Mahony (1932 – 21 July 2020) was a British music writer and magazine editor. He worked as a music journalist in the 1960s under the name Johnny Dean, and was the founder and editor of Beat Instrumental, The Beatles Book, and Record Collector magazines.

== Biography ==
Born in London, he ran a coffee bar before starting work in the music business in the mid-1950s. He wrote songs and contacted music publishers, while working at the same time for ABC Television. In the early 1960s he became the advertising manager of Pop Weekly, a magazine published by Robert Stigwood, through which he first came into contact with Brian Epstein. In late 1962, he established his own magazine, Beat Monthly (later Beat Instrumental), which started featuring the Beatles as cover stars early in 1963.

As the Beatles' popularity in the UK grew, O'Mahony approached Epstein with the suggestion that he produce a monthly magazine devoted to the band. This was The Beatles Book, first published in August 1963, with an initial print run of 40,000, which quickly sold out. At its peak, the magazine went on to sell some 300,000 copies each month. As Johnny Dean, O'Mahony continued to edit and write for the magazine with the full support of Epstein and the band, and also launched the parallel Monkees Monthly in early 1967. The final edition of the original Beatles Book was published in late 1969, but in 1976 O'Mahony began to republish the original issues alongside new content. The revived Beatles Book continued to be published until early 2003.

O'Mahony launched several new magazines in the 1970s, including those devoted to the Police and Starsky and Hutch, and in 1979 launched Record Collector magazine which (as at 2020) continues to be published each month. He also continued to write, and as John Dean wrote the songs and script for the 1999 musical film Julie and the Cadillacs. He retired from his editing responsibilities in 2003.

He died on 21 July 2020, aged 88.
