= Beat Instrumental =

British pop and rock magazine

June 1968 issue

Beat Instrumental was a UK monthly pop and rock magazine. Founded by Sean O'Mahony (aka Johnny Dean) and first published in May 1963 as Beat Monthly, it became Beat Instrumental Monthly with issue 18 and Beat Instrumental from issue 37. Like the weekly Melody Maker, it was aimed at musicians, emphasising instruments, production and equipment in its interviews and moving easily to progressive rock in the late 1960s. The magazine ceased publication in 1980.

Kevin Swift was among Beat Instrumental's reporters in 1966. During the 1970s, the features editor was Steve Turner, and Adam Sweeting also wrote for the magazine.
