= Zazula =

Zazula is a Slavic surname. Notable people with the surname include:

- Frank Zazula (1916–1999), American sports coach
- Jon Zazula (1952–2022), American record label owner and producer
