= Toby Slater =

British singer-songwriter (1979–2021)

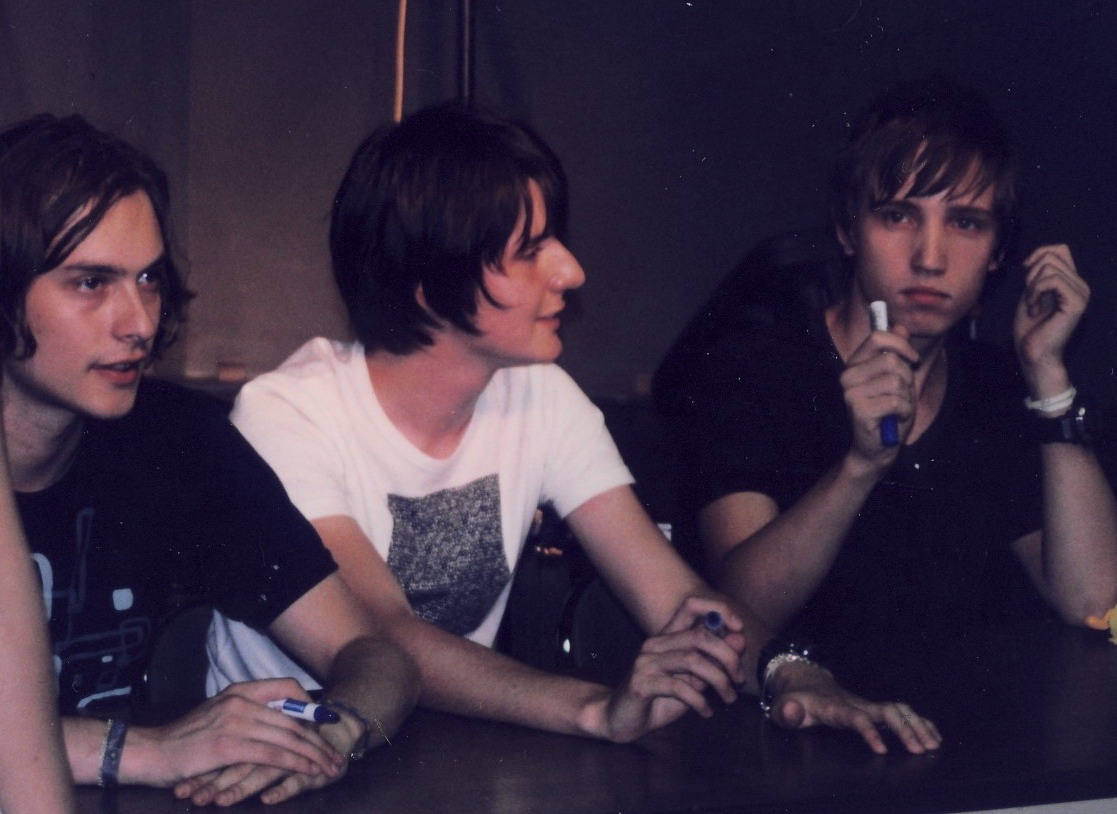
- Slater (far right) with Catch in 1997

Background information
- Born: Toby Lewis Slater; 14 August 1979
- Origin: England
- Died: 13 December 2021 (aged 42)
- Occupations: Singer, songwriter, musician
- Instruments: Vocals, guitar, keyboards
- Labels: White Mischief (Tough Love), Virgin Records (Catch)

Toby Lewis Slater (14 August 1979 – 13 December 2021) was an English singer-songwriter and musician, best known as the lead singer for the 1990s indie pop band Catch, who released two singles in the UK and an album in Indonesia. Slater also recorded and released music as a solo artist and with the band Kunta Kinte, who were renamed Tough Love.

== Career ==
=== 1995–1999: Catch ===
Catch were descended from Brattish, Slater's first band, formed in 1994/95, which also included Ben Etchells. Brattish rehearsed the Catch material extensively, paid for by interested A&R men, but never gigged. This period is briefly mentioned in John Niven's satirical book "Kill Your Friends". Slater also was a driving-force behind the Romo movement, DJing at Soho's Arcadia at L'Equippe Anglais and Madame Jojo's in the autumn/winter of 1995. Melody Maker reported that an eleven track demo tape of Brattish, featuring a heavily synth/electro sound, was circulating among an elite handful at Arcadia/Club Skinny at the time.

"Bingo" was Catch's biggest hit, which resulted in the band appearing on Top of the Pops, Light Lunch, The Paul Ross Show (performing three songs live), The Jack Docherty Show and various Saturday morning UK TV shows. "Bingo" was also being shown on the ITV Chart Show when ITN interrupted programming to report on the death of Diana, Princess of Wales in 1997. Slater also presented some shows on MTV around this time. An album was quickly released in Thailand and Indonesia due to the band's popularity there, with the band securing a number one radio single in Thailand. But the album was never released in the UK due to Slater being unhappy with it at the time. The band visited Jakarta for a promotional tour and performed acoustically for fans.

Despite finding success in the Far East, the band achieved one top 30 and one top 50 hit in the UK, and disbanded after completing their only album. A UK album was due for release, with a different track listing to the Indonesian issue, but this was never released. It is not known whether the UK album was fully completed or not; a working title was believed to have been Victim Support, however a gold recordable CD-R, dated 4 Oct '97, features a proposed running order for an unnamed and unreleased UK album.

=== 2000–2003: Solo material ===
Slater moved to Los Angeles, California and began pursuing a solo career. Returning to London, he formed a group featuring former members of the UK band Salamanda, and began recording and gigging, under his own name. A number of songs were made available online via Slater's own website and via the fledgling Napster file sharing service, on which Slater was a featured artist during August 2000.

These early solo songs included "The Next Life", "Begging Rebecca" and "For You". Videos for the latter two tracks were released on Slater's 2002 single, "Consumption" as enhanced content. The single also featured the tracks "Uprising (Things Are Going to Change...)", "For You" and "Smoking Isn't Natural". The single itself was mixed by English producer/mixing engineer Mark 'Spike' Stent.

=== 2004–2013: Kunta Kinte, Tough Love, ITV show ===
Following the release of "Consumption" and a series of live gigs, mainly in London, Slater started to record demos of songs that would later be released under the band name Kunta Kinte, subsequently renamed Tough Love. Songs included "Stress", "The Perfect Couple" and a cover of "Is That All There Is?".

The band released the five-track "Tough Love" EP that included "Stress", which was also released as a standalone digital single and as a promotional CDR. The EP tracks had been available to stream and download via various official sources including the band's Facebook and MySpace pages since 2007 and the single was officially released on CD and via worldwide digital music vendors on 1 June 2009. Tough Love band members were Slater (Vocals) along with Selina Andrews (Vocals), Craig Davies (Guitar & Vocals), Matt White (Drums & Vocals), Mark Davies (Bass & Vocals) and Ben Hawkins (Percussion). The British newspaper The Guardian described the band as "the Afrobeat Scissor Sisters". Slater had previously worked with Craig Davies, Matt White and Mark Davies on his solo material - the three are listed as musicians alongside Slater and guitarist Nick Fowler on the "Consumption" single.

Following the release of the "Tough Love" EP, the band released a free download of a reworked version of "The Perfect Couple" in 2009. The song tells the story of a bi-curious couple who arrange a full-on same-room swap with another couple. The reworked version featured completely new vocals by Slater (with new backing vocals by Andrews) and re-recorded music, following the same arrangement and structure with slightly alternative lyrics to one of the verses. In the original version, Slater sings "I had to measure myself against a VHS and send it off as a JPEG" which was changed in the 2009 version to "I had to measure myself against a DVD and send it as a PNG". A video was filmed for the song and was made available via the band's Facebook page in January 2010.

Together with his brother Barnaby, Slater was signed to Troika Talent, an agency whose celebrities include David Walliams, Michael Fassbender and Matt Smith among others. In 2012 the two Slater brothers created Trending Topics, a comedy panel show based around the internet and starring Jonathan Ross, David Walliams and Rhod Gilbert for the ITV channel.

=== 2010–2019: Parties and events ===
Slater and the band were also curators of London's "new vaudeville" steampunk club night, White Mischief. Hosted in venues including a 1920s theatre, a palatial Georgian mansion and London's 1,100 capacity Scala, the often sold-out White Mischief shows were founded by Tough Love as a reaction against the dour, bland environments that typify many live intimate club gigs.

The band performed at various gigs and White Mischief nights until 2010 and released a further track, Alpha Male, via their Facebook page in June that year.

In 2010, Slater co-founded Kinky Salon London, the UK chapter of a sex-positive "arty sexy party" originally created in San Francisco in 2003.

In 2012, Slater founded another party, The Summer House Weekend: originally established as a private birthday party, the festival became an annual ticketed event and ran from 2013 to 2019.

== Personal life and death ==
Slater was the son of British singers Stephanie De Sykes and Stuart Slater, who was lead singer of beat group The Mojos. He had one brother, Barnaby Slater, who is a comedian, writer and producer.

He died on 13 December 2021, at the age of 42.

== Discography ==
=== Catch ===
- "Bingo" - single (CD, CD2, 1997)
- "Dive In" - single (CD, CD2, 1998)
- Catch - album (CD, 1997, Indonesia only)

=== Toby Slater ===
- "Consumption" - single (CD, 2002)

=== Tough Love ===
- Tough Love - 5 track EP (CD, digital, 2009)
- "Stress" - single (CDR, digital, 2009)

=== Solo ===
==== Singles ====
- "Consumption"

==== B-sides ====
- "Uprising (Things Are Going to Change...)"
- "For You"
- "Smoking Isn't Natural"

==== Other songs ====
Songs made available online between 2000 and 2003

- "The Next Life" (Free download when Slater was Napster featured artist in 2000)
- "Begging Rebecca"
- "Conquistador"
- "Disconnected"
- "Sunbather"
- "Lachrymosa"
- "Dumb Blonde"
- "Uprising (Things Are Going To Change)"
- "Ritalin"
- "Propaganda"
- "Coming Back to You"
- "Sand"
- "Why" (live)
- "Scars" (live)

=== Tough Love (formerly Kunta Kinte) ===
==== Singles/EP tracks ====
- "Stress"
- "Bastard"
- "Dissenter's Song"
- "Film of My Life"
- "Sticks & Stones"
- "Getting Over It"

==== Other songs ====
Songs made available online between 2004 and 2009

- "The Perfect Couple" (re-recorded and issued as a digital download via Facebook in 2009)
- "Is That All There Is"
- "Getting Over It"
- "Them"
- "Show Me Your Face"
- "Alpha Male"
- "The Perfect Couple" (2009 re-recorded version)
