= Michael Chapman (singer) =

British singer-songwriter and guitarist (1941–2021)

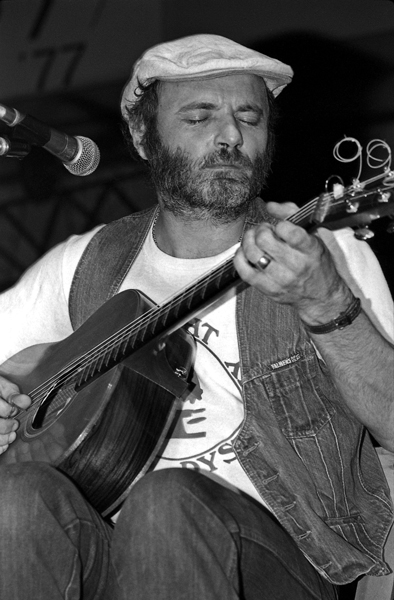

Background information
- Born: 24 January 1941; Hunslet, Leeds, England
- Died: 10 September 2021 (aged 80) Greenhead, Northumberland, England
- Genres: Blues rock, folk rock, jazz rock
- Occupations: Musician, songwriter
- Instruments: Vocals, guitar, bass, banjo, piano, percussion
- Years active: 1966–2021
- Labels: Mooncrest, Secret, Harvest, Deram, Criminal, Black Crow, Strange Fruit, Mooncrest, Demon, Rural Retreat, Secret, Market Square, Blast First Petite, Tompkins Square
- Partner: Andru Chapman
- Website: michaelchapman.co.uk

Michael Chapman (24 January 1941 – 10 September 2021) was a British singer-songwriter and guitarist who released 58 albums, displaying a "fusion of jazz, rock, Indian and ragtime styles [that] made him a cult hero". He began playing with jazz bands, mainly in his home town of Leeds, and became well known in the folk clubs of the late 1960s, as well as on the progressive music scene. Having celebrated fifty years as a professional musician in 2016, he continued to regularly tour the UK, Europe and US.

The significance of Chapman's work underwent several favourable reappraisals, particularly in the 1990s and 2010s. Thurston Moore, with whom Chapman collaborated, cited him as an inspiration in the formation of Sonic Youth.

== Biography ==
=== Early life ===
Michael Chapman was born in Hunslet, Leeds, Yorkshire, the son of James Chapman, a steelworker, and Jane (nee Wheelan), who worked for a mail-order company. While at Cockburn grammar school he played in a skiffle group, before attending Leeds College of Art. A move to Bolton College followed, where he taught in the photography department. At this time, Chapman "started a relationship with one of his students, Andru Makin", who was to remain with him for the rest of his life. He played jazz guitar standards, and was heavily influenced by American performers. Listening to other English guitar players such as Ralph McTell, Chapman evolved his own distinctive style of playing incorporating jazz, folk and ragtime stylings.

=== Folk beginnings, Harvest and Decca ===
Chapman first appeared on the London and Cornwall folk music circuits in 1967, including the Piper's Folk Club in Penzance, alongside John Martyn and Roy Harper. His first album was Rainmaker (1969), produced by Gus Dudgeon, who also worked with Elton John, David Bowie and Steeleye Span, and released on the EMI progressive label Harvest.

While living in Kingston upon Hull, Chapman recorded a further three albums for Harvest. Fully Qualified Survivor (1970), again produced by Dudgeon and with lush strings arranged by Paul Buckmaster, received much critical acclaim from the likes of BBC Radio 1 DJ John Peel, and contained his best-known track, "Postcards of Scarborough". It "included some of his finest and most varied songs" and featured Mick Ronson on guitar, who collaborated with David Bowie immediately afterwards, with some critics noticing similarities in Bowie's Hunky Dory (1971). Rick Kemp played bass and Barry Morgan was on drums and congas. Keef Hartley was a frequent collaborator during this period.

Window (also 1970) and Wrecked Again (1971) quickly followed, the latter having a Memphis flavour and featuring brass arrangements on the title track and "Shuffleboat River Farewell". After a tour of the United States with Kemp, Chapman signed to Decca's subsidiary, Deram, recording an increasingly rockier set of albums. Championed by Charles Shaar Murray and John Peel, he retained a high profile, a lively draw on the college circuit in the UK and across mainland Europe. The record producer Don Nix worked on the album Savage Amusement, which included several songs from the past. Chapman and Kemp used the album's title for a band in the mid 1980s.

=== Post-Decca independent releases ===
Chapman's Decca deal ended with the release of The Man Who Hated Mornings (1977), which was almost immediately re-issued as part of his association with Criminal Records, in 1978. He followed this with an LP of guitar instruction, and continued giving concerts and recording in a variety of styles, and with varying formations. Chapman then started a period of prolific recording activity, recording for numerous smaller record labels, and playing the folk and club circuits. The 1980s was a quieter time for Chapman. He continued to make recordings that straddled musical genres and pushed his guitar playing to the fore, but had neither the profile nor sales of the previous decade, and "for a while he supplemented his income by delivering cars".

=== Renaissance and reappraisals: 1990s onwards ===
The late 1990s onwards represented a period of continued rebirth for Chapman. He embraced the "elder statesman" role and enjoyed critical acclaim for albums like Navigation, Dreaming Out Loud and Still Making Rain (a wry pun title that looked back to his debut album). Chapman released albums about every two years, receiving praise but without great sales, ending with the 1997 release Dreaming Out Loud. Bands like Supergrass acknowledged Chapman's material and playing as a formative influence.

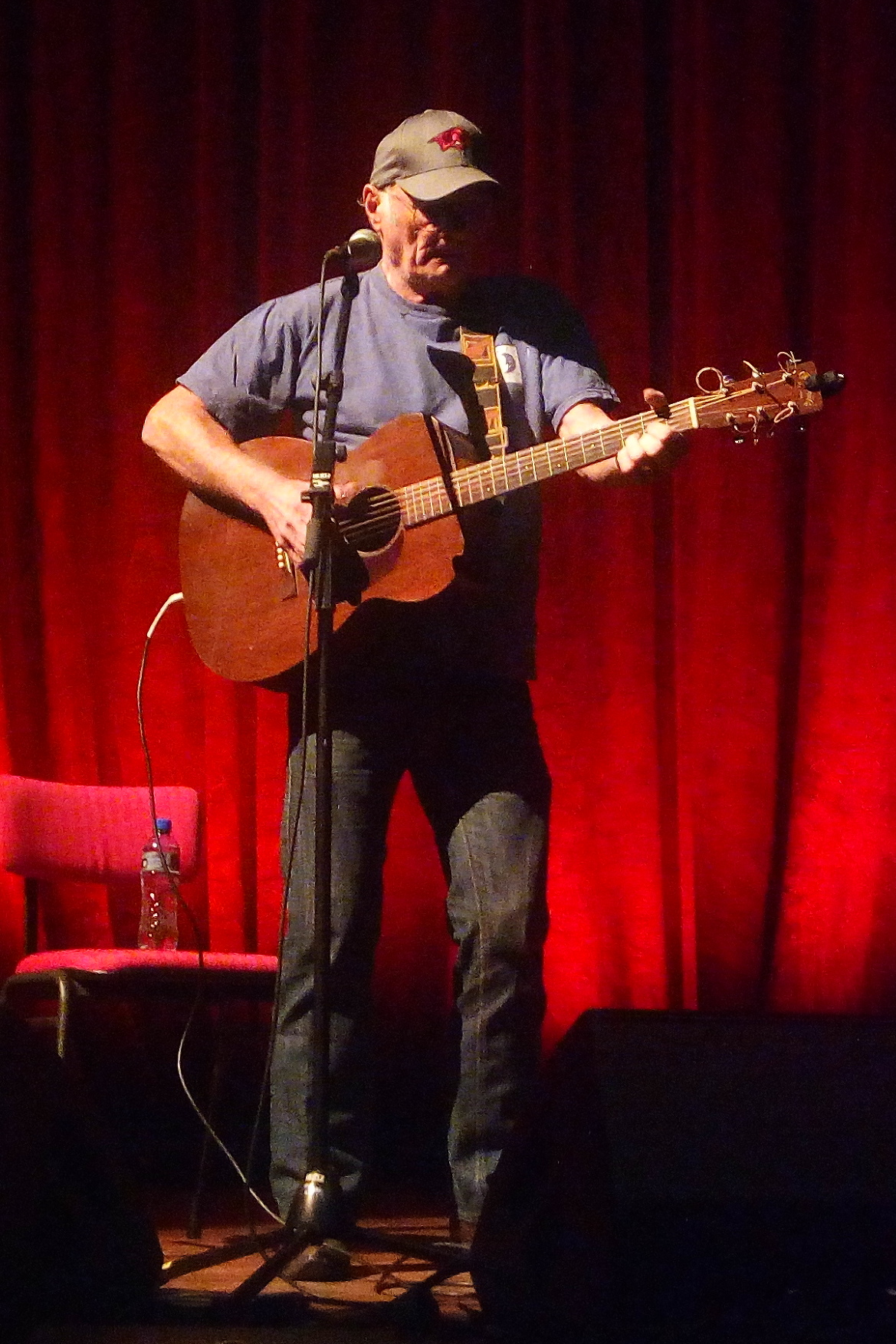
Chapman during the Ramblin' Roots Festival 2017, TivoliVredenburg, Netherlands

The new century saw Chapman exploring his guitar player roots and releasing instrumental albums alongside his song-based sets. Americana and Words Fail Me feature soundscapes that recalled travels in America, and featured a dexterity and inventiveness on the guitar equal to the classic Harvest and Decca periods.

In February 2008, he hosted a charity dinner/auction where a limited edition Vanity and Pride was released featuring Ursa who added her own contribution to Chapman's music.

A tribute album titled Oh Michael, Look What You've Done: Friends Play Michael Chapman was released in 2012 on Tompkins Square Records. It includes contributions from Lucinda Williams, Maddy Prior, William Tyler, Hiss Golden Messenger and Sonic Youth's Thurston Moore.

Chapman's back catalogue for Harvest has been re-released by US based label Light in the Attic in both heavyweight vinyl and CD formats. He also recorded several instrumental albums for Tompkins Square Records, including Fish in 2015.

His website stated: "I had an art college education and on a rainy night in 1966 I went into a pub in Cornwall, but I couldn't afford to pay to go in. So I said, I'll tell you what, I don't want to stay outside in the rain, I'll play guitar for half an hour for you. They offered me a job for the rest of the summer and I've been at it ever since."

=== Personal life and death ===
Michael and Andru Chapman never married but entered a civil partnership in 2020, having lived "in a farm house in Northumbria, just south of Hadrian’s Wall" since the early 1970s. He died at his home on 10 September 2021, at the age of 80.

== Select discography ==
Albums

- Rainmaker (UK LP, Harvest SHVL 755, Jul 1969), reissued (US LP, Light in the Attic Records LITA 079, 2012)
- Guitar Music (UK LP, Standard Music Library ESL.103, 1969)
- Fully Qualified Survivor (UK LP, Harvest SHVL 764, Mar 1970, UK No. 45), reissued (US LP, Light in the Attic Records LITA 060, 2011)
- Window (UK LP, Harvest SHVL 786, Dec 1970), reissued (US LP, Light in the Attic Records LITA 124, 2015)
- Wrecked Again (UK LP, Harvest SHVL 798, Nov 1971), reissued (US LP, Light in the Attic Records LITA 101, 2013)
- Millstone Grit (UK LP, Deram SML 1105, 1973)
- Deal Gone Down (UK LP, Deram SML 1114, July 1974)
- Pleasures of the Street (GER LP, recorded live at Onkel Po's Carnegie Hall, Hamburg, Nova 6.22321 AS, 1975)
- Savage Amusement (UK LP, Decca SKL-R 5242, 1976)
- Michael Chapman Lived Here 1968–1972 (UK compilation LP, Cube Records GNAT 1, 1977)
- The Man Who Hated Mornings (UK LP, Decca SKL-R 5290, 1977), reissued (UK LP, Criminal Records STEAL 3, 1978)
- Play Guitar The Easy Way (UK LP, with instruction manual, Criminal Records STEAL 2, 1978)
- Life on the Ceiling (UK LP, Criminal Records STEAL 5, 1979)
- Looking For Eleven (UK LP, Criminal Records STEAL 9, 1980)
- Almost Alone (UK LP, Black Crow Records CRO 202, 1981)
- Guitar Solo (UK LP, April Music APR 1004, 1982)
- Original Owners (BE LP, Michael Chapman and Rick Kemp, recorded live at Nettlefield Hall, London, Konexion Records KOMA 788003, 1983)
- Heartbeat (NL LP, Coda/New Age 832 223-1, 1987)
- Still Making Rain (1991/3) – Self Release 1991 / Making Waves 1993
- Navigation (UK CD, Planet Records PLAN CD007, 1995)
- Dreaming Out Loud (1997) – Demon Records
- Michael Chapman Black And White (CD, Rural Retreat Records, 1998)
- BBC Sessions 69–75 (1998) Strange Fruit Records
- The Twisted Road (1999) – Mystic UK
- Growing Pains (UK CD, compilation of previously unreleased material recorded 1966–1980, Mooncrest Records CRESTCD 046, 2000)
- Growing Pains 2 (2001) – Mooncrest Records
- Americana (2001) – Apropos / reissued on Blueprint
- Live And Unhinged (CD, Rural Retreat Records, 2001)
- Kule 2 B Blue with Alamo Leal (CD, Rural Retreat Records, 2001)
- Americana 2 (UK CD, Rural Retreat Records, 2002)
- Dogs Got More Sense (2004) – Secret Records
- Journeyman Live DVD (2004) – Secret Records
- 27 06 05 Live in Brighton (CD, Rural Retreat Records, 2005)
- Plaindealer (CD, Rural Retreat Records, 2005)
- Lost (CD, Rural Retreat Records, 2005)
- Words Fail Me (2007)
- Vanity and Pride (2008) – self release – limited edition – Michael Chapman and Ursa
- Sweet Powder (UK CD, Rural Retreat Records, 2008)
- Time Past & Time Passing (2008) – Electric Ragtime
- And Then There Were Three Live in Nottingham 1977 (2010) – Market Square Records
- Wrytree Drift (CD, Rural Retreat Records, 2010)
- Trainsong: Guitar Compositions 1967–2010 (CD, Tompkins Square Records TSQ 2530, 2011)
- The Resurrection and Revenge of The Clayton Peacock (UK CD, Blastfirst Petite PTYT 068, Feb 2012)
- Pachyderm (LP, Blastfirst Petite PTYT 070LP, 2013)
- The Polar Bear (LP, Blastfirst Petite PTYT 078LP, Nov 2014)
- Live At Folk Cottage, Cornwall 1967 (UK DLP, TreeHouse44 TH44LP0201, 2014)
- Fish (LP, Tompkins Square Records TSQ 5203, Oct 2015)
- 50 (US/UK LP, Paradise of Bachelors PoB-29, Jan 2017)
- EB=MC2 (2017) (Michael Chapman & Ehud Banai) – Nana Disc
- True North (US/UK LP, Paradise of Bachelors PoB-044, Feb 2019)
- Another Story (UK, Record Store Day Limited Edition compilation LP, Secret Records SECLP 210, Apr 2019)
- Plaindealer + Twisted Road (2020) Double album – Mooncrest Records
- Americana (LP, Secret Records CRESTLP 108, Apr 2020)
- Michael Chapman – Sweet Powder & Wrytree Drift Double CD (2020) Mooncrest Records
- Michael Chapman – The Decca Years 1974–77 – 8 Panel Digipack (2021) Mooncrest Records

Singles

- "It Didn't Work Out" b/w "Mozart Lives Upstairs" (UK 7" Harvest HAR 5002, 1969)
- "The Banjo Song" b/w "Dumplings" (UK 7" Deram DM 407, 1974)
- "Lovin' Dove" b/w "Steel Bonnets" (UK 7" Decca FR 13658, 1976)
- "While Dancing the Pride of Erin" b/w "The Man Who Hated Mornings" (UK 7" Criminal Records SWAG 1, 1978)
- "Blue Season" b/w "Theme from the Movie of the Same Name" (UK 7" Criminal Records SWAG 6, 1979)
- "Lescudjack" b/w "Wrecked Again" and "Deal Gone Down" (recorded live in Hamburg) (UK 12" Criminal Records D SWAG 7, 1979)
- "East Coast" b/w "White Night Starlight" (UK 7" Criminal Records SWAG 13, 1980)
- "That Time of Night" b/w Lucinda Williams, "That Time of Night" (UK Limited Edition 10" Tompkins Square Records 12653, Nov 2012)
