= Catch (band) =

British band

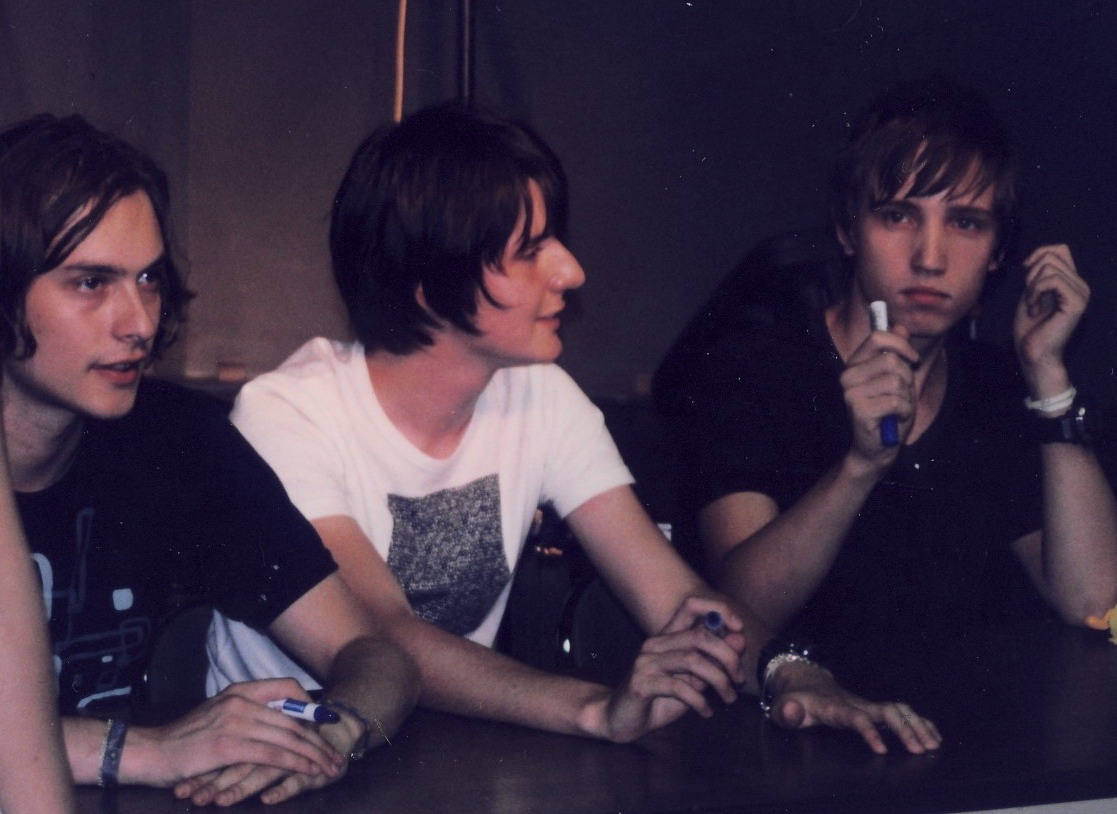
- Catch in Bangkok, Thailand in 1997

Background information
- Origin: London, England
- Genres: Indie pop, Britpop
- Years active: 1997–1999
- Label: Virgin
- Members: Toby Slater; Wayne Murray; Ben Etchells

Catch were an English indie pop band consisting of singer and keyboardist Toby Slater, bassist Wayne Murray and guitarist Ben Etchells. The band were signed to Virgin Records and released two singles - "Bingo", which reached No. 23 on the UK Singles Chart, and "Dive In", which reached No. 44. The band released one self-titled album, which was only issued in Indonesia.

== History ==
Catch descended from Toby Slater's first band Brattish, who were active in 1994–95. Brattish rehearsed the Catch material extensively, paid for by interested A&R men, but never gigged. Slater also was a driving-force behind the Romo movement, DJing at Soho's Arcadia at L'Equippe Anglais and Madame Jojo's in the autumn/winter of 1995. Melody Maker reported that an eleven track demo tape of Brattish, featuring a heavily synth/electro sound, was circulating among an elite handful at Arcadia/Club Skinny at the time.

The release of debut single "Bingo" saw the band appearing on Top of the Pops, Light Lunch, The Paul Ross Show (performing three songs live including 'Don't Wait Up'), The Jack Docherty Show and various Saturday morning UK TV shows. "Bingo" was also being shown on the ITV Chart Show when ITN interrupted programming to report on the death of Diana, Princess of Wales in 1997. Slater also presented some shows on MTV around this time.

The band's debut album was rush released in Indonesia due to the band's sudden popularity there. The track 'Don't Wait Up' was released as a radio single in Indonesia and Thailand alongside 'Dive In' and 'Bingo'. The band visited Jakarta for a promotional tour and performed acoustically for fans.

The album was delayed in the UK due to Slater being unhappy with it at the time, however the band split up prior to it being released in any form in the UK. A working title was believed to have been Victim Support.

On April 14, 1999, Toby Slater officially announced Catch had split up via the bands email list.

The email read:

Hello all.

I'm writing in order to keep you up to date with developments in the Catch camp.

As some of you may know, I was recently the 'victim' of a mischievous, sometimes malicious, hacker. The whole thing was quite upsetting and meant that for a long time I could not read any of your messages, or send you any news. I hope the person involved understands that I have tried to be open and positive towards all our friends and therefore I found the invasion of my privacy extremely hurtful. Hopefully, however, the matter is finished and there are no hard feelings. :)

What to say next? Well, I think most people who subscribe to this newsletter have heard various rumours regarding Catch; I will try and explain what has been going on so that you're all in the clear.

Towards the end of last year Ben, Wayne and I began to realise that, sadly, we were making little progress with Virgin Records. They have been kind to us and had worked hard with us, but were still not able to release our album in the UK. We were subject to some changes of staff at Virgin and this affected us badly, although we still believe in their abilities as a company and were fond of the people we worked with there.

In December we asked if we could leave Virgin Records and they agreed. It is a move that I believe will be beneficial to everyone involved in the long run. We left on a good note, having achieved some small success and experienced many adventures. Virgin wished us well.

At the same time, Ben, Wayne and I decided to part company as a band. But we are still friends and are keeping quite closely in touch.

I don't think I'm speaking out of turn when I say that we all hope you are not too disappointed. This message is not easy to write and we appreciate all the love and support you have given us in the past couple of years. Thank you so much.

The good news is that none of us has given up!

Ben and Wayne, together with a drummer called Martin and a bassist / guitarist / songwriter called, believe it or not, Toby (not the same one!) have formed a new band which I believe is called 1313. It looks as if they will be signing with Food Records very shortly and the whole project is very exciting. Expect to see them playing and recording before too long.

I am planning to go solo, drawing on my love of artists such as David Bowie. I am moving to California, USA, in a couple of weeks, where I hope to work with some new musicians. If anyone ends up over there perhaps you might see me playing live! I now have a very big collection of songs that I am really proud of and I can't wait for you all to hear them.

Wayne, Ben and I in our separate projects are all still striving to write better and better music. We all have big ambitions and will not let you down in that respect. It sounds arrogant, but I think that we all have talents that deserve to be heard by the world.

I am glad and proud of some of the things we did with Catch but we are all keen to try something new. I hope that you will wish us your luck- and listen out for our new projects.

Many, many thanks for all your support, affection... and thanks for listening! I will try and answer any questions you might have- please direct them to the discussion list.

I hope we have your blessing to move on.

Lots of love from Toby. xxx

== Post-split ==
Following the split of Catch, Slater moved to Los Angeles and began pursuing a solo career. Returning to London, he formed a group featuring former members of the UK band Salamanda, and began recording and gigging, under his own name. The Toby Slater Band released one single, "Consumption", and other songs that were made available online via Slater's own website and via the fledgling Napster file sharing service, on which Slater was a featured artist during August 2000.

Slater had written, recorded and released music with a band, initially under the name Kunta Kinte and subsequently as Tough Love. He was also involved in the White Mischief series of steampunk entertainment events based predominantly in London.

Wayne Murray is now a touring guitarist for the Manic Street Preachers and fronts a music project named Boy Cried Wolf. Ben Etchells is a sound engineer at Live Sound Training.

Toby Slater died on 13 December 2021 at the age of 42.

== Discography ==
=== Albums ===
- Catch (Indonesian & Singapore only release, 1997, now out of print)

=== Singles ===
- "Bingo" (September 1997) - UK #23
- "Dive In" (February 1998) - UK #44
- "Don't Wait Up" - Radio Single in Thailand and Indonesia

== List of Catch songs ==
- "Bingo"
- "Dive In"
- "Half the World Away"
- "A New Soul"
- "Don't Wait Up"
- "Pity the Man"
- "My Burst Balloon"
- "Expensive Kiss"
- "Goodbye"
- "Start of Something"
- "Over Again"
- "Maybe Tonight"

=== B-sides ===
- "Boys Will Be Boys"
- "Bitten by You"
- "The Better Me"
- "Simon Says"
- "Pullover Boy"
- "No-One Knows"
- "The Possibilities"
- "Morning Sun"

=== Known demos ===
- "Blue Room"
- "Under the Bed"
- "Victorian Names"
- "Paper Aeroplanes"
- "The Worst Years"
- "My Bright Child"
- "Second to None"

== See also ==
- Toby Slater
